= Tologuica =

Tologuica Temporal range: Early Pleistocene (Middle Villafranchian) ~2.58–1.8 Ma

Scientific classification
- Kingdom: Animalia
- Phylum: Chordata
- Class: Aves
- Order: Galliformes
- Family: Phasianidae
- Genus: †Tologuica; Zelenkov & Kurochkin, 2008

Type species
- Tologuica aurorae Zelenkov & Kurochkin, 2008

Other species
- Tologuica karhui Zelenkov & Kurochkin, 2008

Extinct genus of birds

Tologuica is an extinct genus of phasianid bird. The remains of both species belonging to the genus, T. aurorae and T. karhui, were discovered in Middle Miocene rocks of the Ööshin Formation, in Mongolia.

== History and naming ==
The first remains attributed to Tologuica, including the holotype specimens of the two species, were collected in 1984 by Alexander Karhu in the Sharga locality of the Ööshin Formation, in the Govi-Altai Province of Mongolia. Additional materials were collected by Eugenia Sytshevskaya in 1995 and by Evgeny Kurochkin in 1997 in the same locality. In 2008, Nikita Zelenkov and Kurochkin used those remains to describe a new genus and two new species of phasianid birds, Tologuica aurorae, the type species, and T. karhui.

The etymology of the genus name, Tologuica, is intentionally not precised, although the name is feminine. The species name of the type species, aurorae, refers to Aurora, the Roman goddess of the dawn. The species name of T. karhui honours the Russian paleoornithologist Alexander Karhu, who first collected the remains associated with the genus.

== Species ==
=== T. aurorae ===
T. aurorae is the type species of the genus. Its holotype is PIN, no. 4869/3, a well-preserved left coracoid bone collected in 1984 in Sharga by Karhu. The species is also known from several other fragmentary and isolated bones, such as other coracoids, a carpometacarpus and the outer extremity of a tarsometatarsus. The anatomy of the bones was notably more gracile than those of T. karhui, the holotype coracoid being markedly more slender, and the assigned carpometacarpus was much smaller.

=== T. karhui ===
T. karhui comes from the same deposits and the same horizon than T. aurorae. Its holotype is PIN, no. 4869/63, a complete coracoid bone. It is also known from several fragmentary coracoids, a carpometacarpus, and both extremities of a tarsometatarsus. The coracoids and carpometacarpus were noticeably more robust than those of T. aurorae.

=== T. sp. ===
A number of bones discovered in the Sharga locality were associated to the genus, such as a fragment of the sternum, a fragmentary scapula, several radii and the distal extremity of a tibiotarsus. The fragmentary nature of these remains, as well as the incomplete status of the remains associated with both species hindered their association to a specific species within Tologuica.

== Taxonomy ==
Several shared similarities in its osteology places this genus in close relationships with the extinct landfowls genera Palaeocryptonyx and Palaeortyx, although the structure of the hypotarsus evocates the Pliocene genus Plioperdix.

== Paleobiology ==
Tologuica had a carpometacarpus noticeably elongated, indicating it had better flight abilities than modern landfowls, such as members of the genera Ammoperdix and Coturnix. Another, larger phasianid, speculated to be related to Tologuica, is also known from the same locality.
