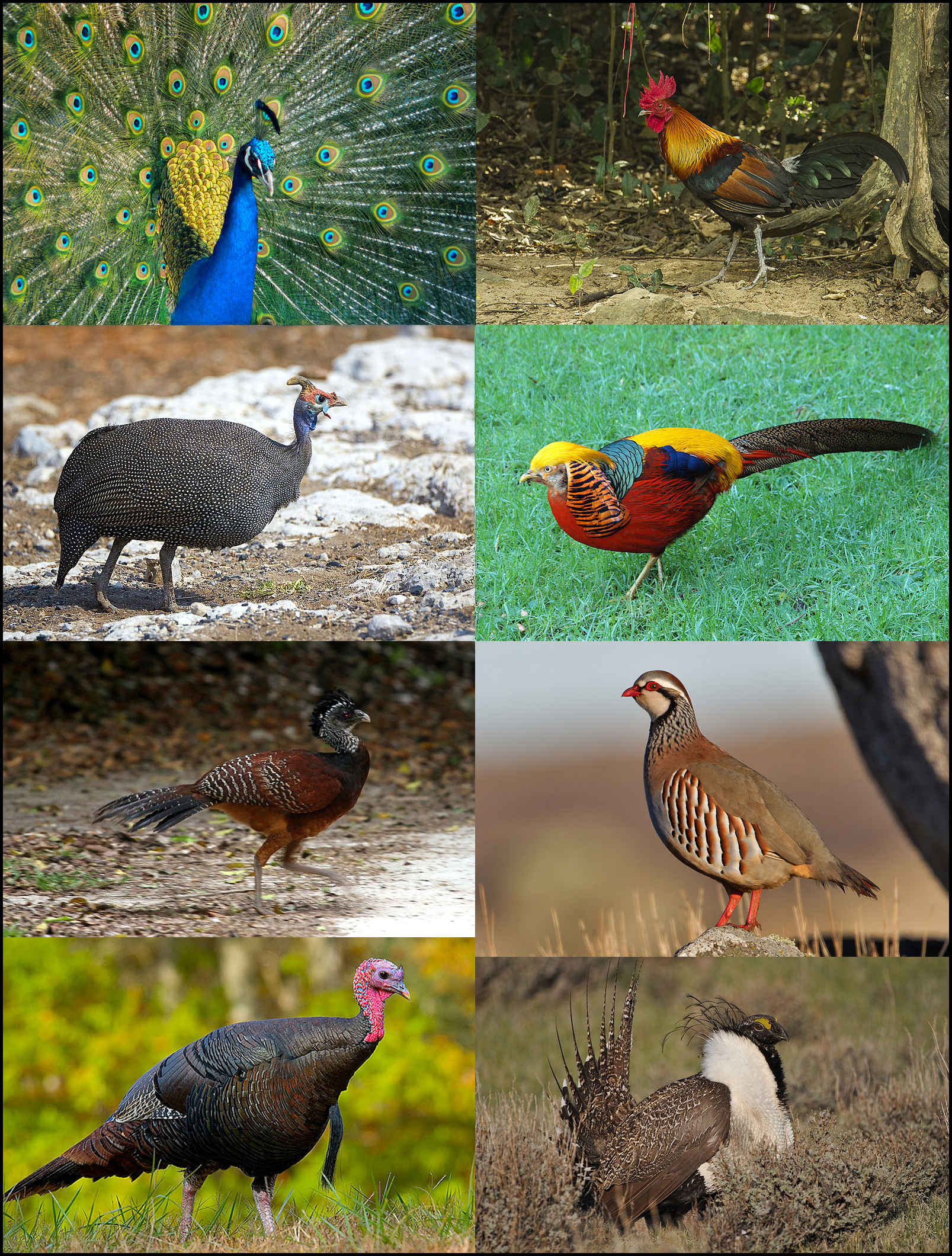
- Clockwise from top left: Indian peafowl (Pavo cristatus), red junglefowl (Gallus gallus), golden pheasant (Chrysolophus pictus), red-legged partridge (Alectoris rufa), Gunnison grouse (Centrocercus minimus), wild turkey (Meleagris gallopavo), great curassow (Crax rubra), helmeted guineafowl (Numida meleagris)

Scientific classification
- Kingdom: Animalia
- Phylum: Chordata
- Class: Aves
- Superorder: Galloanserae
- Clade: Pangalliformes
- Order: Galliformes; Temminck, 1820

Type genus
- Gallus Linnaeus, 1758

Extant families
- Megapodiidae; Cracidae; Superfamily Phasianoidea; Odontophoridae; Numididae; Phasianidae

Synonyms
- Phasianiformes

= Galliformes =

Galliformes Temporal range: Eocene-Recent, 55–0 Ma Possible earlier origin based on molecular clock

Order of heavy-bodied ground-feeding birds

Galliformes (/ˌɡæl.ɪ.ˈfɔːrm.iːz/, GAL-ih-FORM-eez), also known as gallinaceous birds or landfowl, is an order of heavy-bodied terrestrial birds that contains about 290 species. The order is divided into five families: Phasianidae (chicken and junglefowls, Old World quails, partridges, pheasants, turkeys, peafowl and grouse), Odontophoridae (New World quails), Numididae (guinea fowl), Cracidae (including chachalacas and curassows), and Megapodiidae (incubator birds like malleefowl and brushturkeys). Galliformes and the semi-aquatic order Anseriformes (waterfowl) are collectively called fowl.

Galliform birds have adapted to most environments except innermost deserts and perpetually icy regions, inhabiting every continent except Antarctica. They are important in their ecosystems as seed dispersers and insectivores/vermivores, and many are skilled ground-dwellers that escape predators by running rather than flying. They are sexually dimorphic, and males of most species are more colorful than the females, with often elaborate courtship behaviors that include strutting, fluffing of tail or head feathers, and vocal sounds. They are mainly non-migratory.

The name galliformes derives from the type genus Gallus, Latin for "rooster". Several galliform species (most notably the red junglefowl, which have been domesticated into the chicken) have been farmed by humans as poultry for their meat and eggs, and the wild species are hunted as upland game birds, where they are known as gamefowl.

== Systematics and evolution ==
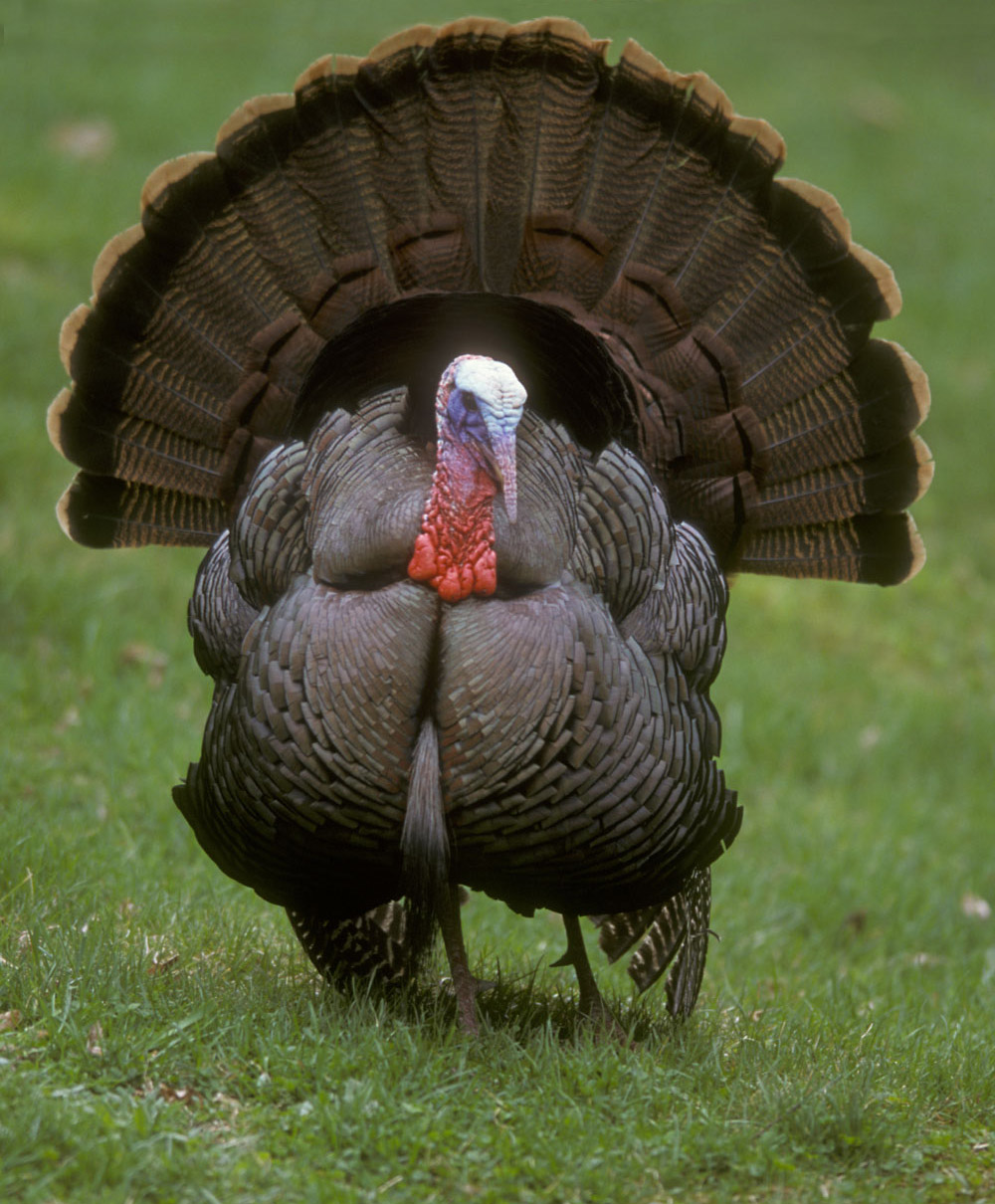
Despite its distinct appearance, the wild turkey is actually a very close relative of pheasants

The living Galliformes were once divided into seven or more families. Despite their distinctive appearance, grouse and turkeys probably do not warrant separation as families due to their recent origin from partridge- or pheasant-like birds. The turkeys became larger after their ancestors colonized temperate and subtropical North America, where pheasant-sized competitors were absent. The ancestors of grouse, though, adapted to harsh climates and could thereby colonize subarctic regions. Consequently, the Phasianidae are expanded in current taxonomy to include the former Tetraonidae and Meleagrididae as subfamilies.

The Anseriformes (waterfowl) and the Galliformes together make up the Galloanserae. They are basal among the living neognathous birds, and normally follow the Paleognathae (ratites and tinamous) in modern bird classification systems. This was first proposed in the Sibley-Ahlquist taxonomy and has been the one major change of that proposed scheme that was almost universally adopted. However, the Galliformes as they were traditionally delimited are called Gallomorphae in the Sibley-Ahlquist taxonomy, which splits the Cracidae and Megapodiidae as an order "Craciformes". This is not a natural group, however, but rather an erroneous result of the now-obsolete phenetic methodology employed in the Sibley-Ahlquist taxonomy. Phenetic studies do not distinguish between plesiomorphic and apomorphic characters, which leads to basal lineages appearing as monophyletic groups.

Historically, the buttonquails (Turnicidae), mesites (Mesitornithidae) and the hoatzin (Opisthocomus hoazin) were placed in the Galliformes, too. The former are now known to be shorebirds adapted to an inland lifestyle, whereas the mesites are probably closely related to pigeons and doves. The relationships of the hoatzin are entirely obscure, and it is usually treated as a monotypic order Opisthocomiformes to signify this.

The fossil record for the Galliformes is incomplete.

- - Galliformes
    - - Megapodiidae – megapodes (7 genera, 21 extant species)
      - - Cracidae – chachalacas, curassows, guans (11 genera, 57 species)
        - - Numididae – guineafowl (4 genera, 8 species)
          - - Odontophoridae – New World quail (10 genera, 34 species)
            - Phasianidae – pheasants & allies (54 genera, 188 species)

Phylogeny of the Galliformes based a study by De Chen and collaborators published in 2021. The number of species are from the list maintained by Frank Gill, Pamela Rasmussen and David Donsker on behalf of the International Ornithologists' Union.

=== Evolution ===
Galloanserae-like birds were one of the main survivors of the K-T Event, that killed off the rest of the dinosaurs. The dominant birds of the dinosaur era were the enantiornithes, toothed birds that dominated the trees and skies. Unlike those enantiornithes, the ancestors of the galliformes were a niche group that were toothless and ground-dwelling. When the asteroid impact killed off all non-avian dinosaurs, and the dominant birds, it destroyed all creatures that lived in trees and on open ground. The enantiornithes were wiped out, but the ancestors of galliformes were small and lived in the ground (unlike water for Anseriformes) which protected them from the blast and destruction.

Fossils of these galliform-like birds originate in the Late Cretaceous, most notably those of Austinornis lentus. Its partial left tarsometatarsus was found in the Austin Chalk near McKinney, Texas, dating to about 85 million years ago (Mya). This bird was quite certainly closely related to Galliformes, but whether it was a part of these or belongs elsewhere in the little-known galliform branch of Galloanserae is not clear. However, in 2004, Clarke classified it as a member of the larger group Pangalliformes, more closely related to chickens than to ducks, but not a member of the crown group that includes all modern galliformes. Another specimen, PVPH 237, from the Late Cretaceous Portezuelo Formation (Turonian-Coniacian, about 90 Mya) in the Sierra de Portezuelo (Argentina) has also been suggested to be an early galliform relative. This is a partial coracoid of a neornithine bird, which in its general shape and particularly the wide and deep attachment for the muscle joining the coracoid and the humerus bone resembles the more basal lineages of galliforms.

Additional galliform-like pangalliformes are represented by extinct families from the Paleogene, namely the Gallinuloididae, Paraortygidae and Quercymegapodiidae. In the early Cenozoic, some additional birds may or may not be early Galliformes, though even if they are, they are unlikely to belong to extant families:

- †Argillipes (London Clay Early Eocene of England)
- †Coturnipes (Early Eocene of England, and Virginia, USA?)
- †Palaeophasianus (Willwood Early Eocene of Bighorn County, USA)
- †Percolinus (London Clay Early Eocene of England)
- †Amitabha (Bridger middle Eocene of Forbidden City, USA) – phasianid?
- †"Palaeorallus" alienus (middle Oligocene of Tatal-Gol, Mongolia)
- †Anisolornis (Santa Cruz Middle Miocene of Karaihen, Argentina)

From the mid-Eocene onwards – about 45 Mya or so, true galliforms are known, and these completely replace their older relatives in the early Neogene. Since the earliest representatives of living galliform families apparently belong to the Phasianidae – the youngest family of galliforms, the other families of Galliformes must be at least of Early Eocene origin but might even be as old as the Late Cretaceous. The ichnotaxon Tristraguloolithus cracioides is based on fossil eggshell fragments from the Late Cretaceous Oldman Formation of southern Alberta, Canada, which are similar to chachalaca eggs, but in the absence of bone material, their relationships cannot be determined except that they are apparently avian in origin.

Modern genera of phasianids start appearing around the Oligocene-Miocene boundary, roughly 25–20 Mya. It is not well known whether the living genera of the other, older, galliform families originated around the same time or earlier, though at least in the New World quail, pre-Neogene forms seem to belong to genera that became entirely extinct later on.

A number of Paleogene to mid-Neogene fossils are quite certainly Galliformes, but their exact relationships in the order cannot be determined:

- †Galliformes gen. et sp. indet. (Oligocene) – formerly in Gallinuloides; phasianid?
- †Palaealectoris (Agate Fossil Beds Early Miocene of Sioux County, USA) – tetraonine?

=== List of major taxa ===
For a long time, the pheasants, partridges, and relatives were indiscriminately lumped in the Phasianidae, variously including or excluding turkeys, grouse, New World quail, and guineafowl, and divided into two subfamilies – the Phasianinae (pheasant-like forms) and the Perdicinae (partridge-like forms). This crude arrangement was long considered to be in serious need of revision, but even with modern DNA sequence analyses and cladistic methods, the phylogeny of the Phasianidae has resisted complete resolution.

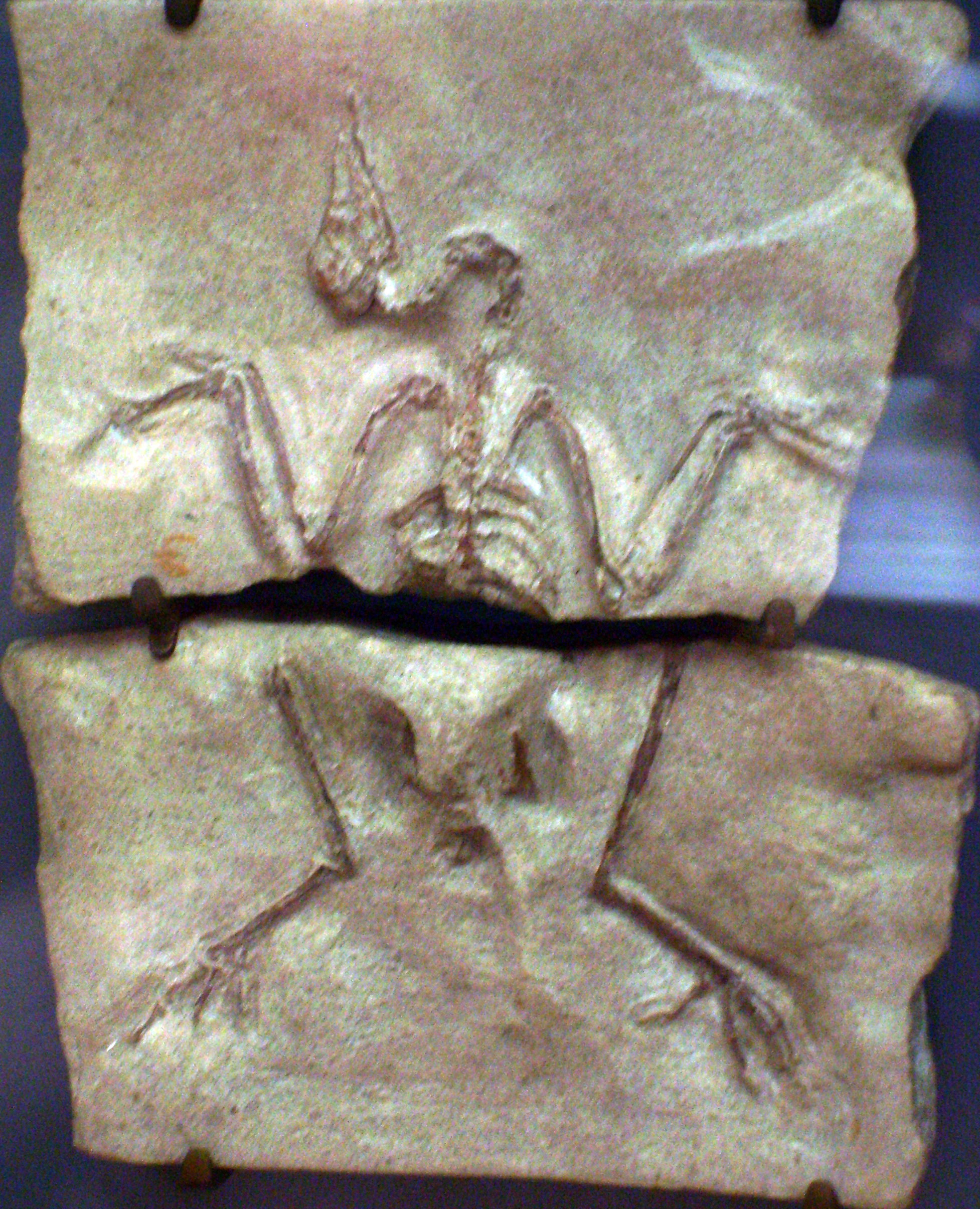
Palaeortyx skeleton, Muséum national d'histoire naturelle, Paris

A tentative list of the higher-level galliform taxa, listed in evolutionary sequence, is:

- †Archaeophasianus Lambrecht 1933 (Oligocene? – Late Miocene)
- †Argillipes Harrison & Walker 1977
- †Austinornis Clarke 2004 [Pedioecetes Baird 1858] (Austin Chalk Late Cretaceous of Fort McKinney, USA)
- †Chambiortyx Mourer-Chauviré et al. 2013
- †Coturnipes Harrison & Walker 1977
- †Cyrtonyx tedfordi (Barstow Late Miocene of Barstow, USA)
- †Linquornis Yeh 1980 (middle Miocene)
- †Namaortyx Mourer-Chauviré, Pickford & 2011
- †Palaeorallus alienus Kuročkin 1968 nomen dubium
- †Sobniogallus Tomek et al. 2014
- †Tristraguloolithus Zelenitsky, Hills & Curri 1996 [ootaxa- cracid?]
- †Procrax Tordoff & Macdonald 1957 (middle Eocene? – Early Oligocene)
- †Paleophasianus Wetmore 1940
- †Taoperdix Milne-Edwards 1869 (Late Oligocene)
- Family †Gastornithidae? Fürbringer, 1888
  - Gastornis Hébert, 1855 (vide Prévost, 1855) [Diatryma Cope, 1876] (Paleocene-Eocene)
- Family †Sylviornithidae? Mourer-Chauviré & Balouet, 2005
  - †Sylviornis Poplin, 1980 (Holocene)
  - †Megavitiornis Worthy, 2000 (Holocene)
- Family †Paraortygidae Mourer-Chauviré 1992
  - †Pirortyx Brodkorb 1964
  - †Scopelortyx Mourer-Chauviré, Pickford & Senut 2015
  - †Paraortyx Gaillard 1908 sensu Brodkorb 1964
  - †Xorazmortyx Zelenkov & Panteleyev 2019
- Family †Quercymegapodiidae Mourer-Chauviré 1992
  - †Taubacrex Alvarenga 1988
  - †Ameripodius Alvarenga 1995
  - †Quercymegapodius Mourer-Chauviré 1992
- Family Megapodiidae – mound-builders and scrubfowl, or megapodes
  - †Mwalau Worthy et al. 2015 (Lini's megapode)
  - †Ngawupodius & Ivison 1999
  - Brushturkey group
    - Talegalla Lesson 1828
    - Leipoa Gould 1840 [Progura de Vis 1889; Chosornis de Vis 1889; Palaeopelargus de Vis 1892] (Malleefowl)
    - Alectura Gray 1831 [Catheturus Swainson 1837] (Australian Brushturkeys)
    - Aepypodius Oustalet 1880
  - Scrubfowl group
    - Macrocephalon Müller 1846 [Megacephalon Gray 1846; Megacephalon Gray 1844 nomen nudum; Galeocephala Mathews 1926] (Maleos)
    - Eulipoa Ogilvie-Grant 1893 (Moluccan Megapodes)
    - Megapodius Gaimard 1823 non (sic) Mathews 1913 [Megathelia Mathews 1914; Amelous Gloger 1841]
- Family Cracidae – chachalacas, guans and curassows
  - †Archaealectrornis Crowe & Short 1992 (Oligocene)
  - †Boreortalis Brodkorb 1954
  - †Palaeonossax Wetmore 1956 (Brule Late Oligocene of South Dakota, USA)
  - Penelopinae Bonaparte 1851 (Guans)
    - Chamaepetes Wagler 1832 (black & sickle-winged guan)
    - Penelopina Reichenbach 1861 (Highland Guans)
    - Aburria Reichenbach 1853 [Opetioptila Sundevall 1873; Pipile Bonaparte 1856 non Pipilo Vieillot 1816; Cumana Coues 1900]
    - Penelope Merrem 1786 [Penelopsis Bonaparte 1856]
  - Cracinae Rafinesque 1815
    - Ortalis Merrem 1786 [Ganix Rafinesque 1815] {Ortalidini Donegan 2012} (Chachalacas)
    - Oreophasis Gray 1844 {Oreophasini Bonaparte 1853} (Horned Guans)
    - Cracini Rafinesque 1815 (Curassows)
      - Nothocrax Burmeister 1856 (Nocturnal Curassows)
      - Pauxi Temminck 1813 [Ourax Cuvier 1817; Lophocerus Swainson 1837 non Hemprich & Ehrenberg 1833; Urax Reichenbach 1850]
      - Mitu Lesson 1831 (razor-billed curassows)
      - Crax Linnaeus 1758
- Suborder Phasiani
  - Family †Gallinuloididae – tentatively placed here
    - †Gallinuloides Eastman 1900 [Palaeobonasa Shufeldt 1915]
    - †Paraortygoides Mayr 2000
  - Family Numididae – guineafowl
    - Guttera Wagler 1832
    - Numida Linnaeus 1764 [Querelea Reichenbach 1852] (Helmeted Guineafowl)
    - Acryllium Gray 1840 (Vulturine Guineafowl)
    - Agelastes Bonaparte 1850
  - Family Odontophoridae – New World quail
    - †Miortyx Miller 1944
    - †Nanortyx Weigel 1963
    - †Neortyx Holman 1961
    - Ptilopachinae Bowie, Coehn & Crowe 2013
      - Ptilopachus Swainson 1837
    - Odontophorinae Gould 1844
      - Rhynchortyx Ogilvie-Grant 1893 (Tawny-faced Quail)
      - Oreortyx Baird 1858 [Orortyx Coues 1882] (Mountain Quail)
      - Dendrortyx Gould 1844 (Wood Partridges)
      - Philortyx Gould 1846 non Des Murs 1854 (Banded Quail)
      - Colinus Goldfuss 1820 [Eupsychortyx Gould 1844; Gnathodon Streubel 1842; Ortygia Boie 1826; Philortyx Des Murs 1854 non Gould 1846] (Bobwhites)
      - Callipepla Wagler 1832 [Lophortyx Bonaparte 1838] ()
      - Cyrtonyx Gould 1844 ()
      - Dactylortyx Ogilvie-Grant 1893 (Singing Quail)
      - Odontophorus Vieillot 1816 [Dentophorus Boie 1828] (Wood Quail)
  - Family Phasianidae – pheasants, partridges and relatives
    - †Alectoris" pliocaena Tugarinov 1940b
    - †Bantamyx Kuročkin 1982
    - †Centuriavis lioae Ksepka et al., 2022
    - †Diangallus Hou 1985
    - †"Gallus" beremendensis Jánossy 1976b
    - †"Gallus" europaeus Harrison 1978
    - †Lophogallus Zelenkov & Kuročkin 2010
    - †Megalocoturnix Sánchez Marco 2009
    - †Miophasianus Brodkorb 1952 [Miophasianus Lambrecht 1933 nomen nudum; Miogallus Lambrecht 1933 ]
    - †Palaeocryptonyx Depéret 1892 [Chauvireria Boev 1997; Pliogallus Tugarinov 1940b non Gaillard 1939; Lambrechtia Janossy 1974 ]
    - †Palaeortyx Milne-Edwards 1869 [Palaeoperdix Milne-Edwards 1869]
    - †Plioperdix Kretzoi 1955 [Pliogallus Tugarinov 1940 nec Gaillard 1939]
    - †Rustaviornis Burchak-Abramovich & Meladze 1972
    - †Schaubortyx Brodkorb 1964
    - †Shandongornis Yeh 1997
    - †Shanxiornis Wang et al. 2006
    - †Tologuica Zelenkov & Kuročkin 2009
    - Subfamily Rollulinae Bonaparte, 1850
    - Subfamily Phasianinae
      - Tribe Lerwini von Boetticher, 1939 – snow partridge
      - Tribe Ithaginini Wolters 197 – blood pheasant
      - Tribe Lophophorini Gray, 1841 – monals, monal-partridges, and tragopans
      - Tribe Pucrasiini Wolters 1976 – koklass pheasant
      - Tribe Meleagridini – turkey
      - Tribe Tetraonini Leach 1820 – grouse
      - Tribe Rhizotherini – long-billed partridges
      - Tribe Phasianini Horsfield 1821 – true pheasants and partridges
    - Subfamily Pavoninae
      - Tribe Pavonini Rafinesque 1815 – peafowl, arguses, and Tropicoperdix partridges
      - Tribe Polyprectronini Blyth 1852 – peacock-pheasants, Asian spurfowl, and crimson-headed partridge
      - Tribe Gallini Brehm 1831 – junglefowl, bamboo partridges, and true francolins
      - Tribe Coturnicini Reichenbach, 1848 - Old World quail, snowcocks, and allies

The relationships of many pheasants and partridges were formerly very badly resolved and much confounded by adaptive radiation (in the former) and convergent evolution (in the latter). Thus, the bulk of the Phasianidae was alternatively treated as a single subfamily Phasianinae. The grouse, turkeys, true pheasants, etc., would then become tribes of this subfamily, similar to how the Coturnicinae are commonly split into a quail and a spurfowl tribe. In 2021, Kimball et al. found the family to comprise three distinct subfamilies, with two containing multiple genera; these results were followed by the International Ornithological Congress.

The partridge of Europe is not closely related to other partridge-like Galliformes, as already indicated by its sexually dimorphic coloration and possession of more than 14 rectrices, traits it shares with the other advanced phasianids. However, among these its relationships are obscure; it is unclear whether it is closer to the turkeys or to certain short-tailed pheasants like Ithaginis, Lophophorus, Pucrasia, and Tragopan. In 2021, Kimball et al. found it to belong to the subfamily Phasianini, alongside the true pheasants.

== Phylogeny ==
Living Galliformes based on the work by John Boyd.

Galliformes classification

- - - Megapodiidae (bushturkeys)
      - - Talegalla
        - - Leipoa
          - - Alectura
            - Aepypodius
      - - Macrocephalon
        - - Eulipoa
          - Megapodius
  - - Cracidae
      - Penelopinae (guans)
        - Chamaepetes
        - - Penelopina
          - - Aburria
            - Penelope
      - Cracinae (curassows)
        - Ortalis
        - - Oreophasis
          - Cracini
            - Nothocrax
            - - Pauxi
              - - Mitu
                - Crax
    - Phasiani
      - Numididae (guineafowl)
        - Guttera
        - - Numida
          - - Acryllium
            - Agelastes
      - Phasianoidea
        - Odontophoridae (New World quail)
          - Ptilopachus
          - Odontophorinae
            - Rhynchortyx
            - - - Cyrtonyx
                - - Dactylortyx
                  - Odontophorus
              - - Oreortyx
                - - Dendrortyx
                  - - Philortyx
                    - - Colinus
                      - Callipepla
        - Phasianidae
          - - Rollulinae
              - ?Melanoperdix
              - ?Rhizothera
              - Xenoperdix
              - - Arborophila
                - - Rollulus
                  - Caloperdix
          - - Pavoninae
              - Tropicoperdix
              - - Coturnicini (Old World quail & partridges)
                  - - Ammoperdix
                    - - - Synoicus
                        - Excalfactoria
                      - - Anurophasis
                        - Margaroperdix
                        - Coturnix
                  - - - Tetraogallus
                      - Alectoris
                    - - ?Pternistis
                      - - †Ophrysia
                        - Perdicula
              - - - Gallini (junglefowl & francolins)
                    - - Bambusicola
                      - Gallus
                    - - Scleroptila
                      - - Peliperdix
                        - Francolinus
                - - Pavonini (peafowl and arguses)
                    - - Rheinardia
                      - Argusianus
                    - - Afropavo
                      - Pavo
                  - Polyplectronini
                    - ?Galloperdix
                    - - Haematortyx
                      - Polyplectron
            - Phasianinae
              - Ithaginis
              - - - Lophophorini (tragopans & monals)
                    - Tragopan
                    - - ?Lerwa
                      - Tetraophasis
                      - Lophophorus
                - - Phasianini (true pheasants)
                    - ?Perdix
                    - - Syrmaticus
                      - - - Phasianus
                          - Chrysolophus
                        - - Lophura
                          - - Catreus
                            - Crossoptilon
                  - Tetraonini (turkeys & grouse)
                    - Pucrasia
                    - - Meleagris
                      - - Bonasa
                        - - Tetrastes
                          - - Centrocercina
                              - Centrocercus
                              - - Dendragapus
                                - Tympanuchus
                            - Tetraonina
                              - Lagopus
                              - - Falcipennis
                                - - Canachites
                                  - - Tetrao
                                    - Lyrurus

== Description ==
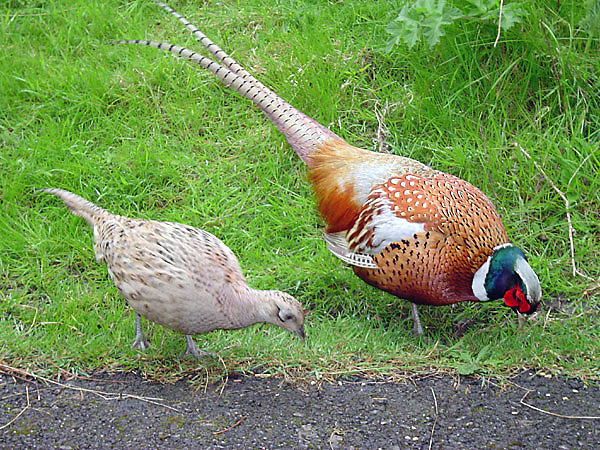
Female (left) and male common pheasants: Sexual dimorphism is conspicuous in this species, one of the most apomorphic gamefowl

As their name suggests, they are chicken-like in appearance, with rounded bodies and blunt wings, and range in size from small at 15 cm (6 inches) to large at 120 cm (4 feet). They are mainly terrestrial birds, and their wings are short and rounded for short-distance flight. Galliforms are anisodactyl like passerines, but some of the adult males grow spurs that point backwards.

Gallinaceous birds are arboreal or terrestrial animals; many prefer not to fly, but instead walk and run for locomotion. They live 5–8 years in the wild and up to 30 years in captivity. They can be found worldwide and in a variety of habitats, including forests, deserts, and grasslands. They use visual displays and vocalizations for communication, courtship, fighting, territoriality, and brooding.

They have diverse mating strategies: some are monogamous, while others are polygamous or polygynandrous. Male courtship behavior includes elaborate visual displays of plumage. They breed seasonally in accordance with the climate and lay 3-16 eggs per year in nests built on the ground or in trees.

Gallinaceous birds feed on a variety of plant and animal material, which may include fruits, seeds, leaves, shoots, flowers, tubers, roots, insects, snails, worms, lizards, snakes, small rodents, and eggs.

These birds vary in size from the diminutive king quail (Coturnix chinensis) (5 in) long and weighing 28–40 g (1–1.4 oz) to the largest extant galliform species, the North American wild turkey (Meleagris gallopavo), which may weigh as much as 14 kg (30.5 lb) and may exceed 120 cm (47 in).

The galliform bird species with the largest wingspan and largest overall length (including a train of over 6 feet) is most likely the green peafowl (Pavo muticus). Most galliform genera are plump-bodied with thick necks, moderately long legs, and short, rounded wings. Grouse, pheasants, francolins, and partridges are typical in their outwardly corpulent silhouettes.

Adult males of many galliform birds have one to several sharp horny spurs on the back of each leg, which they use for fighting. Several lineages exhibit pronounced sexual dimorphism, and among each galliform clade, the more apomorphic ("advanced") lineages tend to be more sexually dimorphic.

== Flightlessness ==
While most Galliformes are rather reluctant flyers, truly flightless forms are unknown among the extant members of the order. Though they are often mischaracterised as weak-flying, Galliformes are actually highly specialised for their particular flight style, bearing extremely powerful flight muscles, and some species are even migratory. Adult snowcocks are, however, flightless, requiring gravity to launch, although juveniles can still fly relatively well.

Nonetheless, a few birds outside the Galliformes crown-group did produce flightlessness.

The genus Sylviornis, a huge prehistorically extinct species of New Caledonia, was flightless, but as opposed to most other flightless birds like ratites or island rails which become flightless due to arrested development of their flight apparatus and subsequently evolve to larger size, Sylviornis seems to have become flightless simply due to its bulk, with the wing reduction following consequently, not being the reason for its flightlessness.

The gigantic Australian mihirungs, which may be closer to Galliformes than to Anseriformes as traditionally expected, achieved flightlessness more traditionally, strongly reducing their wings and keel. They were massive herbivorous birds, among the largest avian dinosaurs of all time.

By contrast, the stem-galliform Scopelortyx appears to have been more aerial than modern fowl, with a flight style more suited for gliding and soaring.

== Behaviour and ecology ==
Most of the galliform birds are more or less resident, but some of the smaller temperate species (such as quail) do migrate over considerable distances. Altitudinal migration is evidently quite common amongst montane species, and a few species of subtropical and subarctic regions must reach their watering and/or foraging areas through sustained flight. Species known to make extensive flights include the ptarmigans, sage-grouse (Centrocercus), crested partridge, green peafowl, crested argus, mountain peacock-pheasant (Polyplectron inopinatum), koklass pheasant (Pucrasia macrolopha), and Reeves's pheasant (Syrmaticus reevesii). Other species — most of the New World quail (also known as the 'toothed quail'), the enigmatic stone partridge (Ptilopachus petrosus) of Africa, guineafowl, and eared pheasants (Crossoptilon) — are all notable for their daily excursions on foot which may take them many miles in a given day.

Some Galliformes are adapted to grassland habitat, and these genera are remarkable for their long, thin necks, long legs, and large, wide wings. Fairly unrelated species like the crested fireback (Lophura ignita), vulturine guineafowl (Acryllium vulturinum), and malleefowl (Leipoa ocellata) are outwardly similar in their body types (see also convergent evolution).

Most species that show only limited sexual dimorphism are notable for the great amount of locomotion required to find food throughout the majority of the year. Those species that are highly sedentary but with marked ecological transformations over seasons exhibit marked distinct differences between the sexes in size and/or appearance. Eared-pheasants, guineafowl, toothed quail, and the snow partridge (Lerwa lerwa) are examples of limited sexual differences and requirements for traveling over wide terrain to forage.

=== Winter ecology ===
Gallinaceous birds are well adapted to regions with cold winters. Their larger size, increased plumage, and lower activity levels help them to withstand the cold and conserve energy. Under such conditions, they are able to change their feeding strategy to that of a ruminant. This allows them to feed on and extract energy and nutrients from coarse, fibrous plant material, such as buds, twigs, and conifer needles. This provides a virtually unlimited source of accessible food and requires little energy to harvest.

=== Food and feeding ===
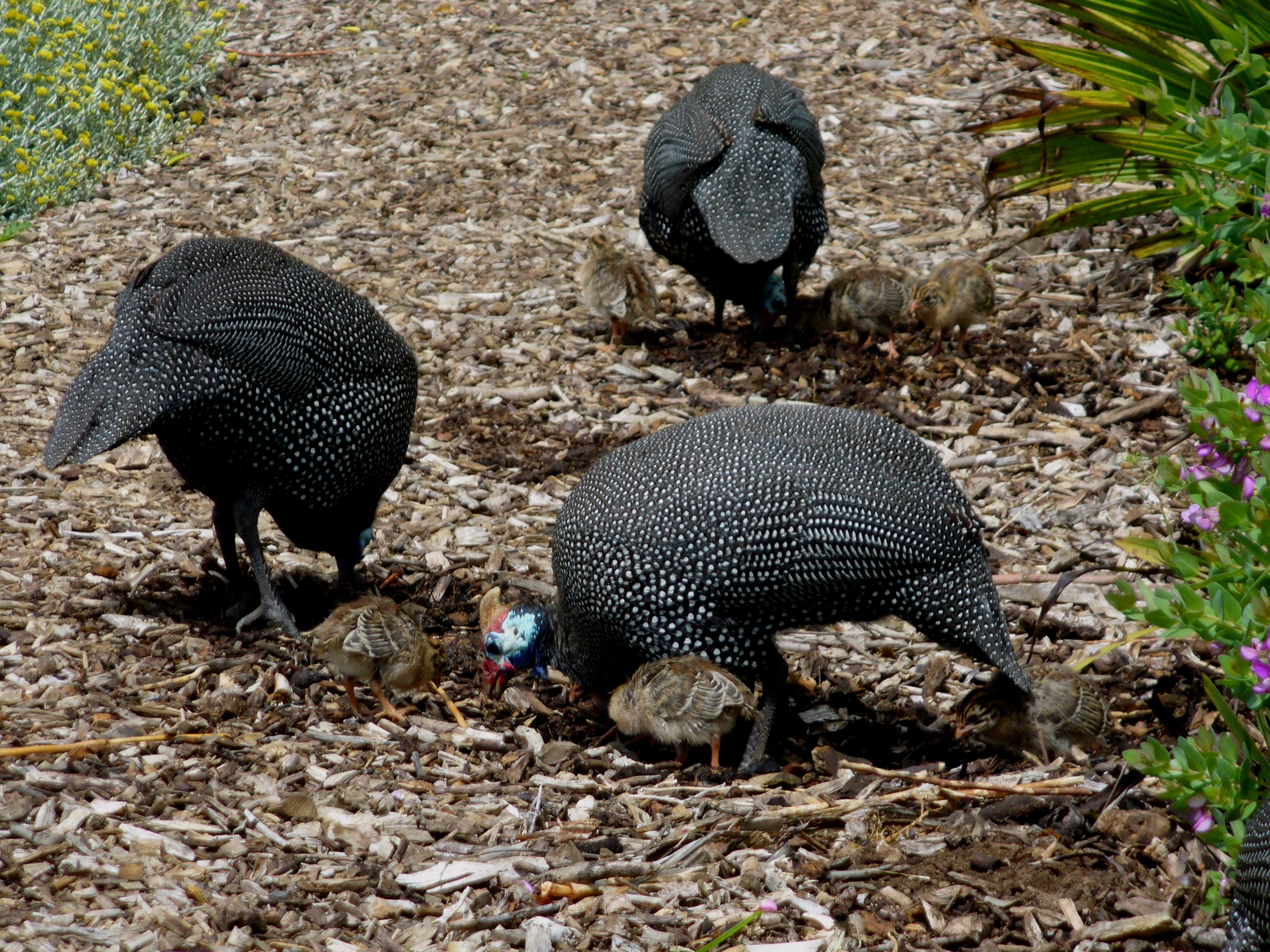
Flock of adult and young helmeted guineafowl foraging

Herbivorous to slightly omnivorous galliforms, forming the majority of the group, are typically stoutly built and have short, thick bills primarily adapted for foraging on the ground for rootlets or the consumption of other plant material such as heather shoots. The young birds will also take insects.

Peafowl, junglefowl and most of the subtropical pheasant genera have very different nutritional requirements from typical Palearctic genera. The Himalayan monal (Lophophorus impejanus) has been observed digging in the rotting wood of deadfall in a similar manner to woodpeckers to extract invertebrates, even bracing itself with aid of its squared tail. The cheer pheasant (Catreus wallichi), crested argus (Rheinardia ocellata), the crested partridge (Rollulus roulroul) and the crested guineafowl (Guttera pucherani) are similar ecologically to the Himalayan monal in that they too forage in rotting wood for termites, ant and beetle larvae, molluscs, crustaceans and young rodents.

Typical peafowl (Pavo), most of the peacock-pheasants (Polyplectron), the Bulwer's pheasant (Lophura bulweri), the ruffed pheasants (Chrysolophus) and the hill partridges (Arborophila) have narrow, relatively delicate bills, poorly suited for digging. These galliform genera prefer instead to capture live invertebrates in leaf litter, in sand, silt or loose soil, shallow pools or along stream banks. These genera are also outwardly similar in that they each have exceptionally long, delicate legs and toes and the tendency to frequent seasonally wet habitats to forage, especially during chick-rearing. The blue peafowl (Pavo cristatus) is famed in its native India for its appetite for snakes – even poisonous cobras – which it dispatches with its strong feet and sharp bill. The Lady Amherst's pheasant (Chrysolophus amherstiae), green peafowl (Pavo muticus), Bulwer's pheasant and the crestless fireback (Lophura erythrophthalma) are notable for their aptitude to forage for crustaceans such as crayfish and other aquatic small animals in shallow streams and amongst rushes in much the same manner as some members of the rail family (Rallidae). Similarly, although wild turkeys (Meleagris gallopavo) have a diet primarily of vegetation, they will eat insects, mice, lizards, and amphibians, wading in water to hunt for the latter. Domestic chickens (Gallus gallus domesticus) share this opportunistic behaviour and will eat insects, mice, worms, and amphibians.

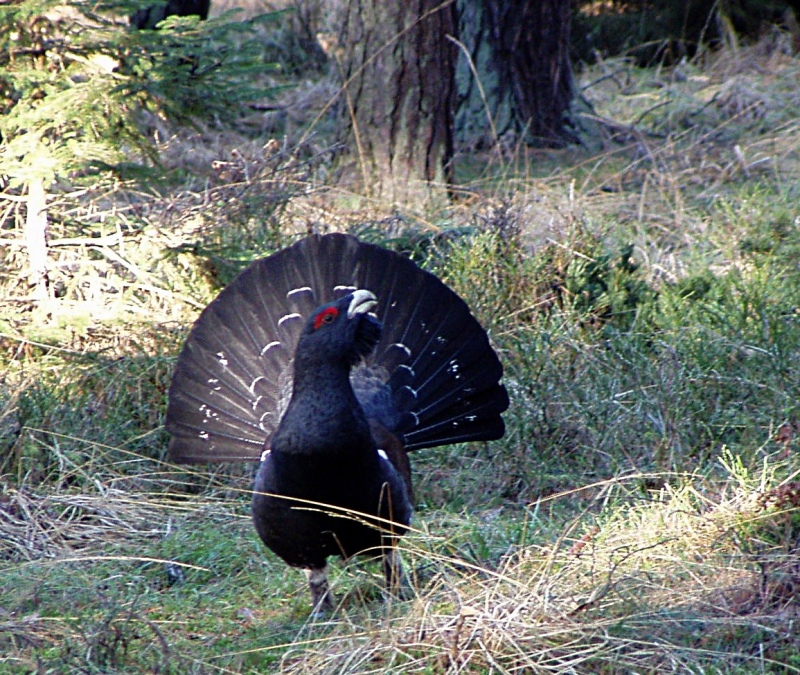
During mating season, the male western capercaillie feeds mainly on bilberry leaves, which are toxic to most herbivores

The tragopans (Tragopan), mikado pheasant (Syrmaticus mikado), and several species of grouse and ptarmigan are exceptional in their largely vegetarian and arboreal foraging habitats; grouse are especially notable for being able to feed on plants rich in terpenes and quinones—such as sagebrush or conifers—which are often avoided by other herbivores. Many species of moderate altitudes—for example the long-tailed pheasants of the genus Syrmaticus—also find a great deal of their daily nutritional requirements in the tree canopies, especially during the snowy and rainy periods when foraging on the ground is dangerous and less than fruitful for a variety of reasons. Although members of the genus Syrmaticus are capable of subsisting almost entirely on vegetarian materials for months at a time, this is not true for many of the subtropical genera. For example, the great argus (Argusianus argus) and crested argus may do most of their foraging during rainy months in the canopy of the jungle, as well. There they are known to forage on slugs, snails, ants, and amphibians to the exclusion of plant material. How they forage in the forest canopy during the rainy months is unknown.

=== Reproduction ===
Most galliforms are very prolific, with clutches regularly exceeding 10 eggs in many species. In contrast to most birds which are – at least for a particular breeding season – monogamous, galliforms are often polygynous or polygamous. Such species can be recognized by their pronounced sexual dimorphism.

Galliform young are very precocious and roam with their mothers – or both parents in monogamous species – mere hours after hatching. The most extreme case are the Megapodiidae, where the adults do not brood, but leave incubation to mounds of rotting vegetation, volcanic ash, or hot sand. The young must dig out of the nest mounds after hatching, but they emerge from the eggs fully feathered, and upon leaving the mound, they are able to fly considerable distances.

== Common species ==
Grouse and ptarmigans - Family Tetraonidae

Grouse, ptarmigans, and prairie chickens are all chicken-like birds with short, curved, strong bills, part of the family Tetraonidae. This group includes 25 species residing mostly in North America. They are mainly ground-dwellers and have short, rounded wings for brief flights. They are well adapted to winter by growing feather "snowshoes" on their feet and roosting beneath the snow. They range in size from the 13-inch (33 cm) white-tailed ptarmigan to the 28-inch (71 cm) sage grouse. Their plumage is dense and soft and is most commonly found in shades of red, brown, and gray to camouflage to the ground. They are polygamous and male courtship behavior includes strutting and dancing and aggressive fighting for possession of females. The typical clutch size is between seven and 12 eggs.

Turkeys - Family Meleagrididae

Turkeys are large, long-legged birds that can grow up to 4 feet (1.2 m) in height and weigh up to 30 pounds (14 kg) in the wild. They have a long, broad, rounded tail with 14–19 blunt feathers. They have a naked, wrinkled head and feathered body. The North American wild turkey – Meleagris gallopavo – has five distinct subspecies (Eastern, Rio Grande, Florida [Osceola], Merriam's, and Gould's). Hybrids also exist where the ranges of these subspecies overlap. All are native only to North America, though transplanted populations exist elsewhere. Their plumage differs slightly by subspecies, but is generally dark to black for males, with buff to cream highlights, and generally drab brown for females. The feathers are quite iridescent and can take on distinct reddish/copper hues in sunlight. Their feathers are well defined with broad, square ends, giving the bird the appearance of being covered in scales. Males have a "beard" of coarse black bristles hanging from the center of their upper breasts and tend to have more vibrantly colored plumage than do females. They breed in the spring and their typical clutch size is between 10 and 12 eggs. The ocellated turkey (Meleagris ocellata), a different species of turkey, currently exists only in a portion of the Yucatán peninsula. After the 19th and early 20th centuries, wild turkey populations dropped significantly because of hunting and habitat loss. However, populations now flourish again due to hunting management and transplanting. The ocellated turkey, not commonly hunted, is currently threatened due to ongoing habitat loss in the Yucatán.

Pheasants, quail, and partridges - Family Phasianidae

The family is divided into four groups: 30 species of new world quail, residing between Paraguay and Canada, 11 species of Old World quail in Africa, Australia, and Asia, 94 species of partridges, and 48 species of pheasants. This family includes a wide range of bird sizes from a 5 1/2 inches (14 cm) quail to pheasants up to almost 30 inches (76 cm). Pheasants and quail have heavy, round bodies and rounded wings. Though they have short legs, they are very fast runners when escaping predators.

Chachalacas - Family Cracidae

Chachalacas are found in the chaparral ecosystems from southern Texas through Mexico and Costa Rica. They are mainly arboreal and make their nests in trees 5 to 15 feet (1.5 to 4.6 m) above the ground. They are large, long-legged birds that can grow up to 26 inches (66 cm) long. They have long tails and are chicken-like in appearance. Their frail-looking yet sturdy nests are made of sticks and leaves. Their clutch size is three or four eggs. The males make a unique, loud, mating call that give them their name. Chachalacas feed mainly on berries, but also eat insects. They are a popular game bird, as their flesh is good to eat. They are also commonly domesticated as pets.
