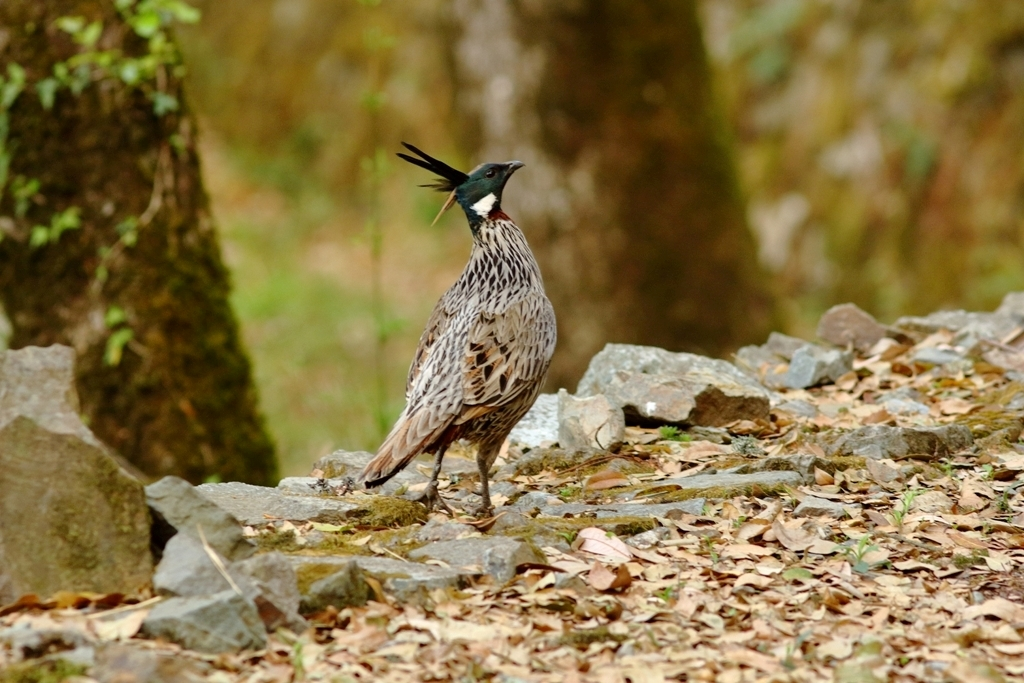
- Male at Pangot, Uttarakhand, India
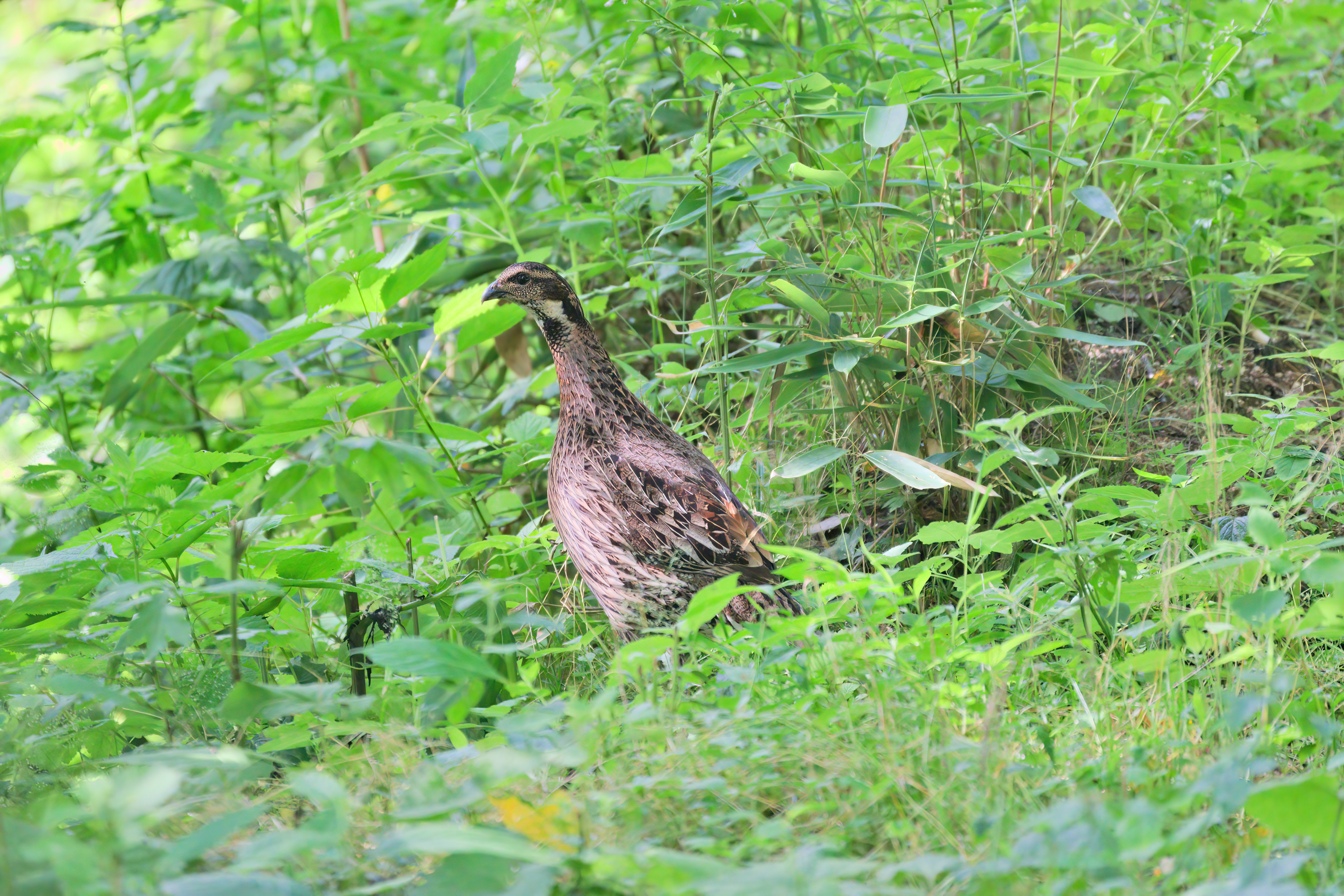
- Female at Yichang, Hubei, China

Conservation status
- Least Concern (IUCN 3.1)

Scientific classification
- Kingdom: Animalia
- Phylum: Chordata
- Class: Aves
- Order: Galliformes
- Family: Phasianidae
- Subfamily: Phasianinae
- Genus: Pucrasia; G.R. Gray, 1841
- Species: P. macrolopha

Binomial name
- Pucrasia macrolopha (Lesson, 1829)

= Koklass pheasant =

Species of bird

The koklass pheasant (Pucrasia macrolopha) is a species of gamebird, being closely related to progenitive grouse that lived during the Miocene. They are distantly related to pheasants and are most closely related to grouse and turkeys. Koklass are the only species in the monotypic genus Pucrasia. Both the words koklass and pucrasia have been onomatopœically derived from the bird's territorial call.

Koklass are boreal adapted species which separate into three distinct species groups. They are one of the few gamebirds that regularly fly uphill and are capable of sustained flights of many miles. They are monogamous with a slight tendency toward social polyandry. Both parents rear the chicks. Koklass are largely vegetarian for much of the year consuming pine nuts, pine shoots, bamboo shoots and seeds. They are highly insectivorous during the warmer months that coincide with nesting and chick-rearing. During this phase of their life cycle they live almost exclusively on ants but also are documented consuming catkins, pollen and fruit.

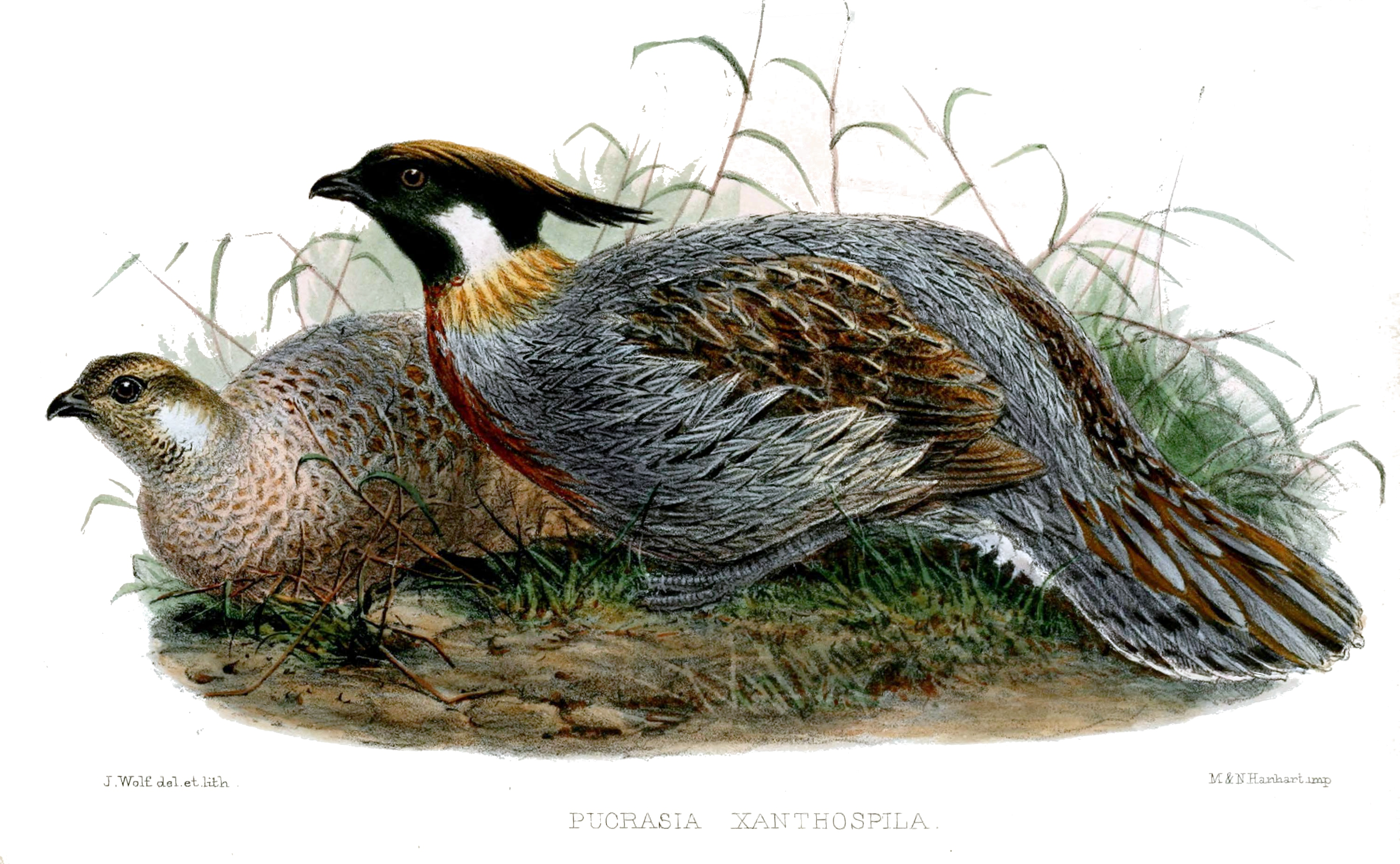
P. m. xanthospila

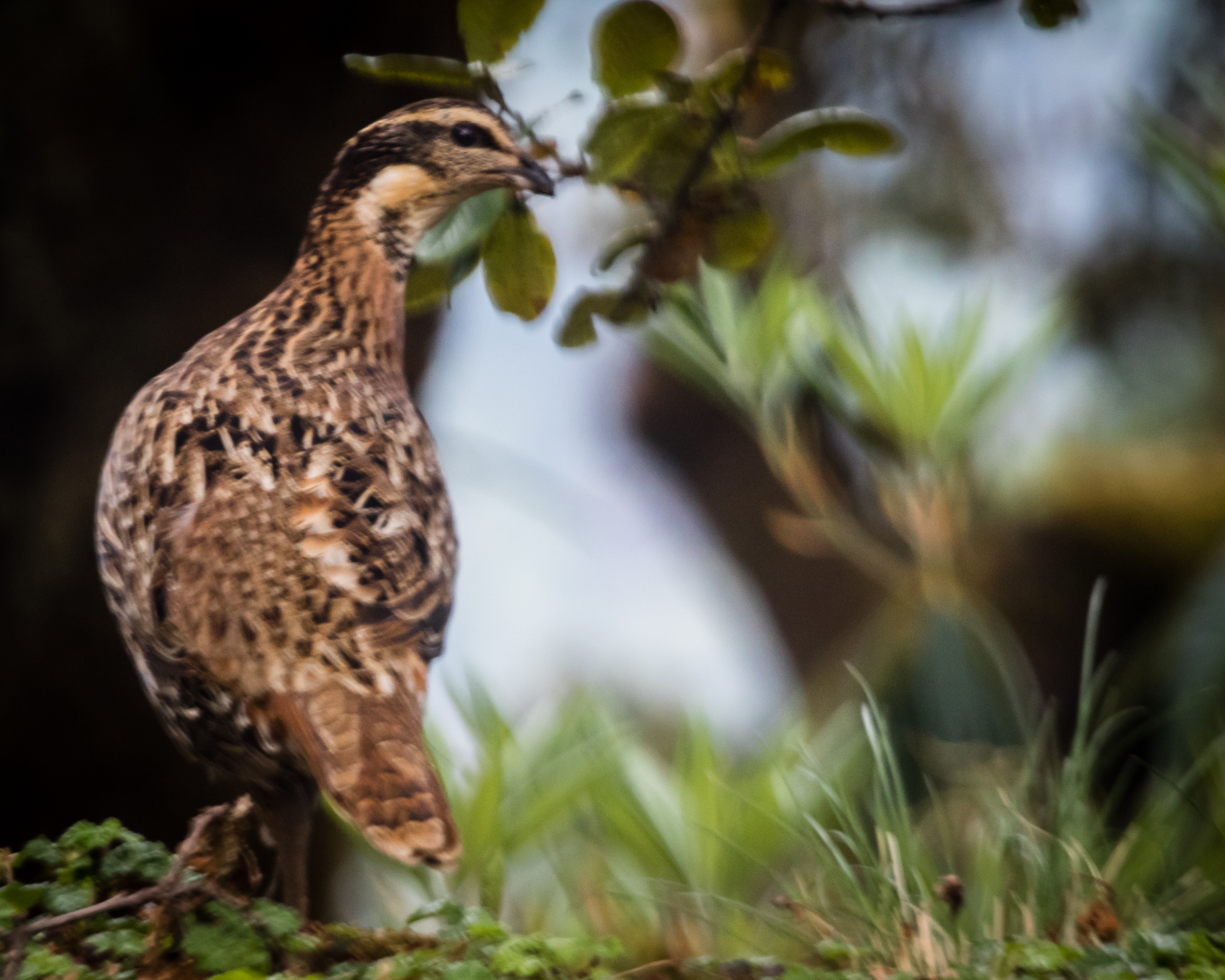
Female koklass pheasant (Pucrasia macrolopha)

The koklass pheasant is a polytypic species, with nine recognized subspecies:

- Kashmir koklass pheasant - P. m. biddulphi (Marshall G.F.L, 1879)
- Western koklass pheasant - P. m. castanea (Gould, 1854)
- Darwin's koklass pheasant - P. m. darwini (Swinhoe, 1872)
- Joret's koklass pheasant - P. m. joretiana (Heude, 1883)
- Indian koklass pheasant - P. m. macrolopha (Lesson R.P., 1829)
- Meyer's koklass pheasant - P. m. meyeri (Madarász, 1886)
- Nepal koklass pheasant - P. m. nipalensis (Gould, 1854)
- Orange-collared koklass pheasant - P. m. ruficollis (David A. & Oustalet, 1877)
- Yellow-necked koklass pheasant - P. m. xanthospila (Gray & GR, 1886)

This entry deals with the subspecies P. m. biddulphi, which ranges from Kashmir to Kullu in India. With exception of the subspecies P. m. nipalensis, P. m. castanea and P. m. macrolopha, which are endemic to the southern side of northwest and western Himalaya, the other five are confined to China and Mongolia.

The koklass pheasant is a medium-sized elusive bird confined to high altitude forests from Afghanistan to central Nepal, and in northeastern Tibet to northern and eastern China. Upper parts of male koklass pheasant are covered with silver-grey plumage streaked velvety-black down the centre of each feather, and it has the unique feature of a black head, chestnut breast and prominent white patches on the sides of neck. The females differ from males in above characters and instead their upper parts are covered with pale brown plumage. Both sexes, however, have distinct elongated tails tipped with pale feathers. The males are known to weigh about 1135–1415 g and the females, about 1025–1135 g, with the body length varying from 58 to 64 cm and 18–22 cm respectively. Immature and juveniles resemble adult females in plumage pattern.

Like the western tragopan, it does not extend its range above the tree line. One of the less colourful pheasants, the koklass exhibits moderate sexual dimorphism. Though they skulk under bushes, which makes direct sighting difficult, they give loud chorus/predawn calls during the breeding season and during autumn, revealing their presence and allowing the populations to be estimated. They remain in pairs or small family groups throughout the year. They nest on the ground and spend the nights roosting on trees, or under rock overhangs.

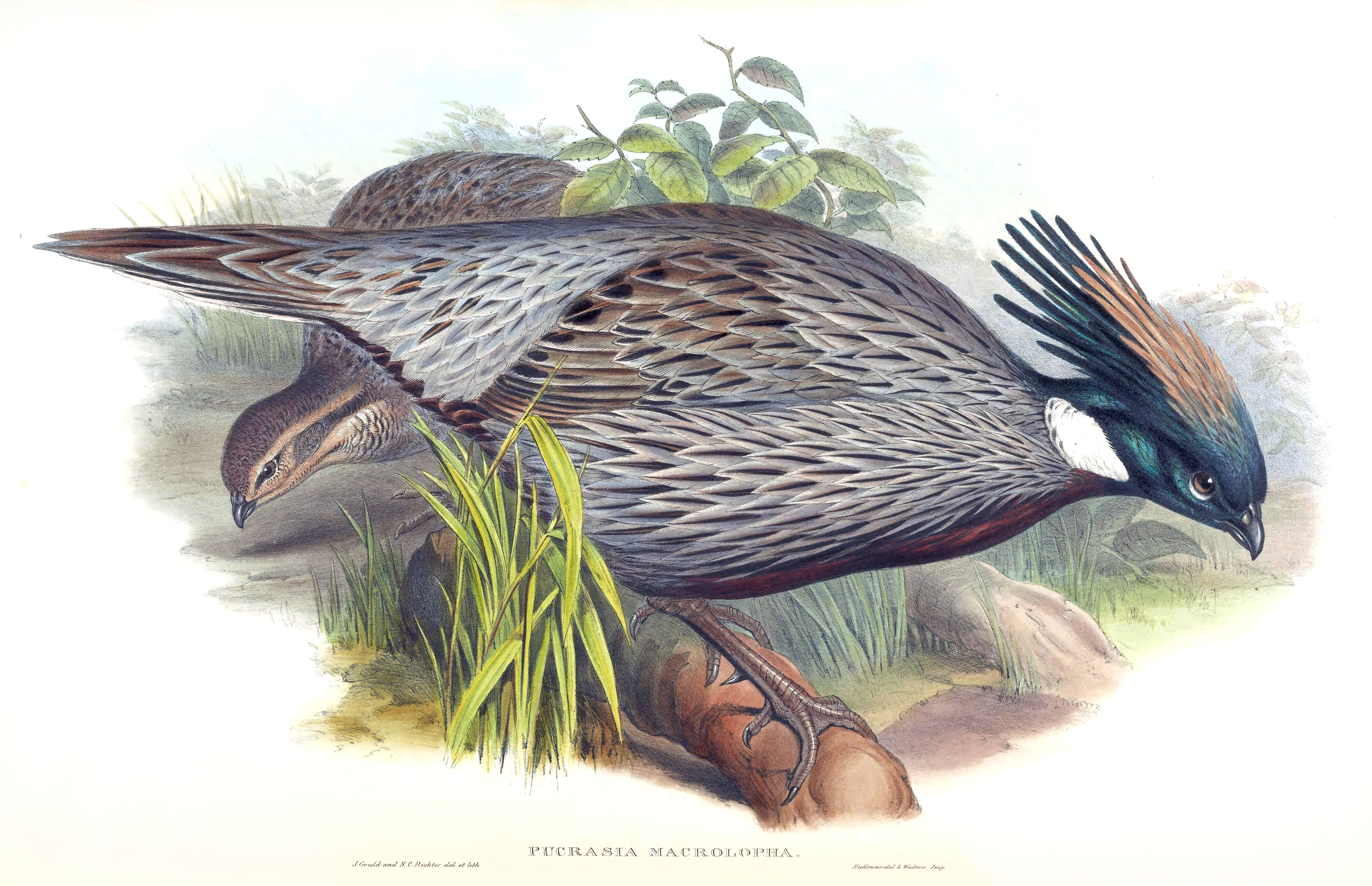

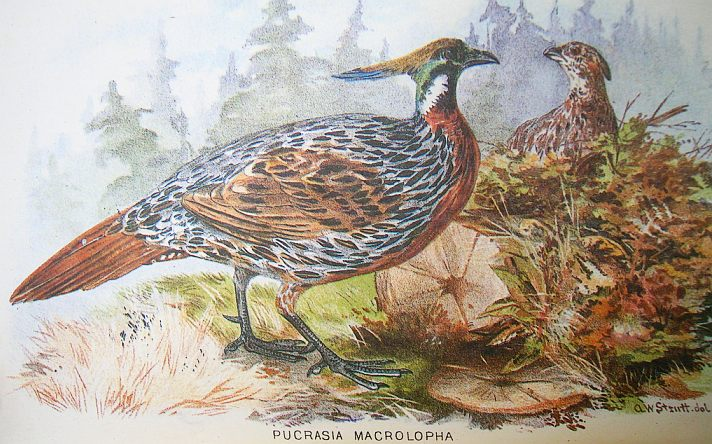

== Gallery ==
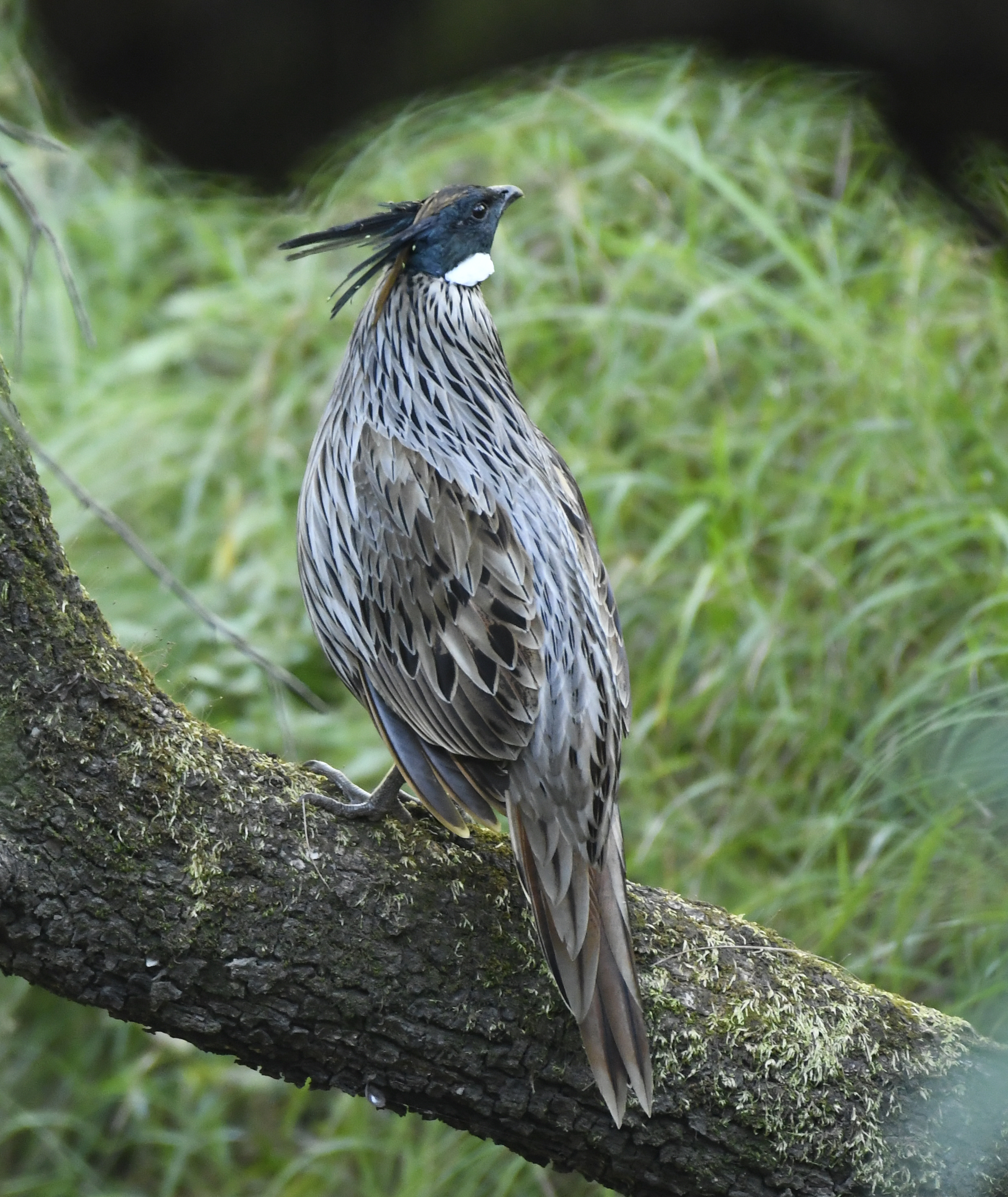
Pucrasia macrolopha macrolopha Male at Manila, Uttarakhand

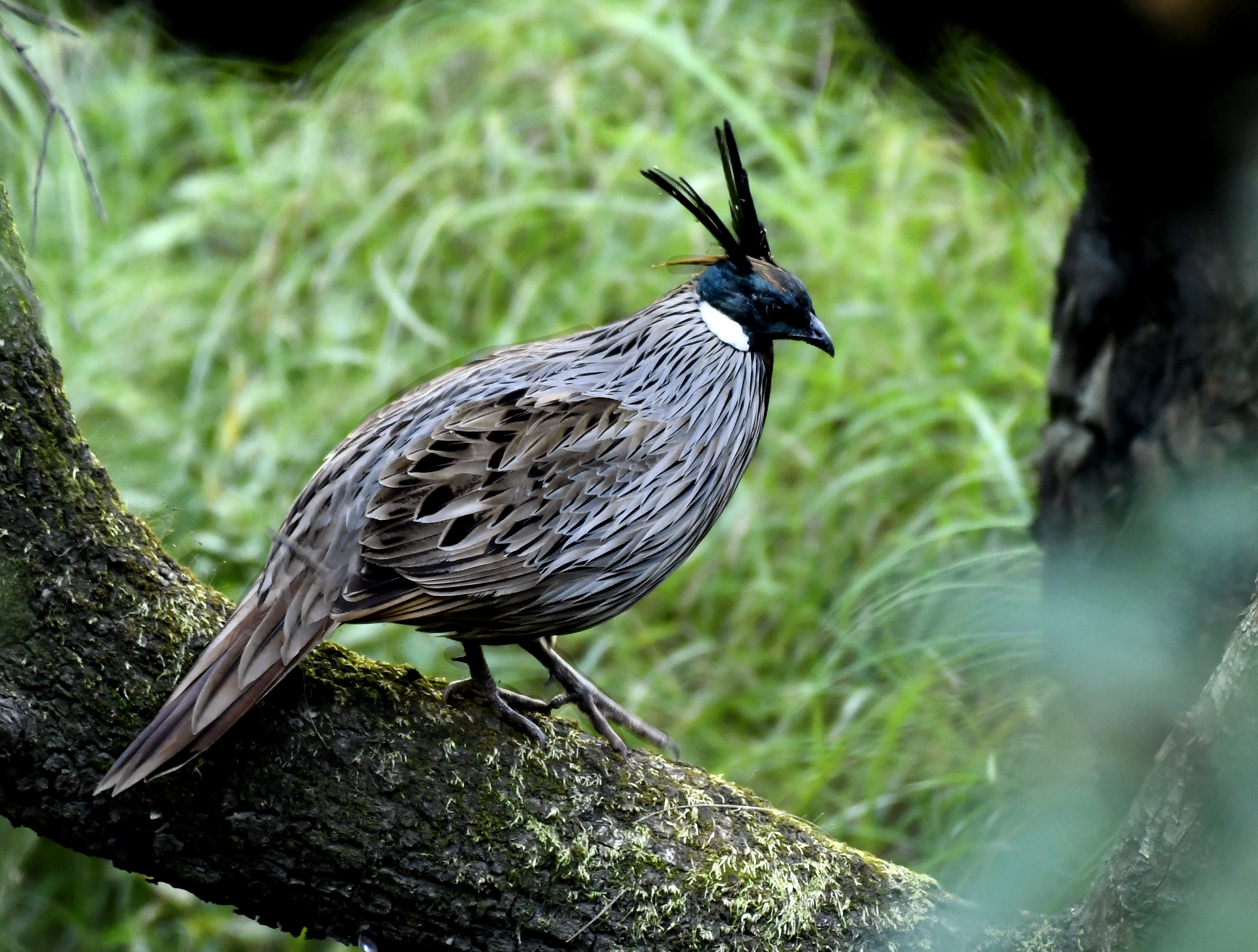
Pucrasia macrolopha macrolopha Male at Manila, Uttarakhand
