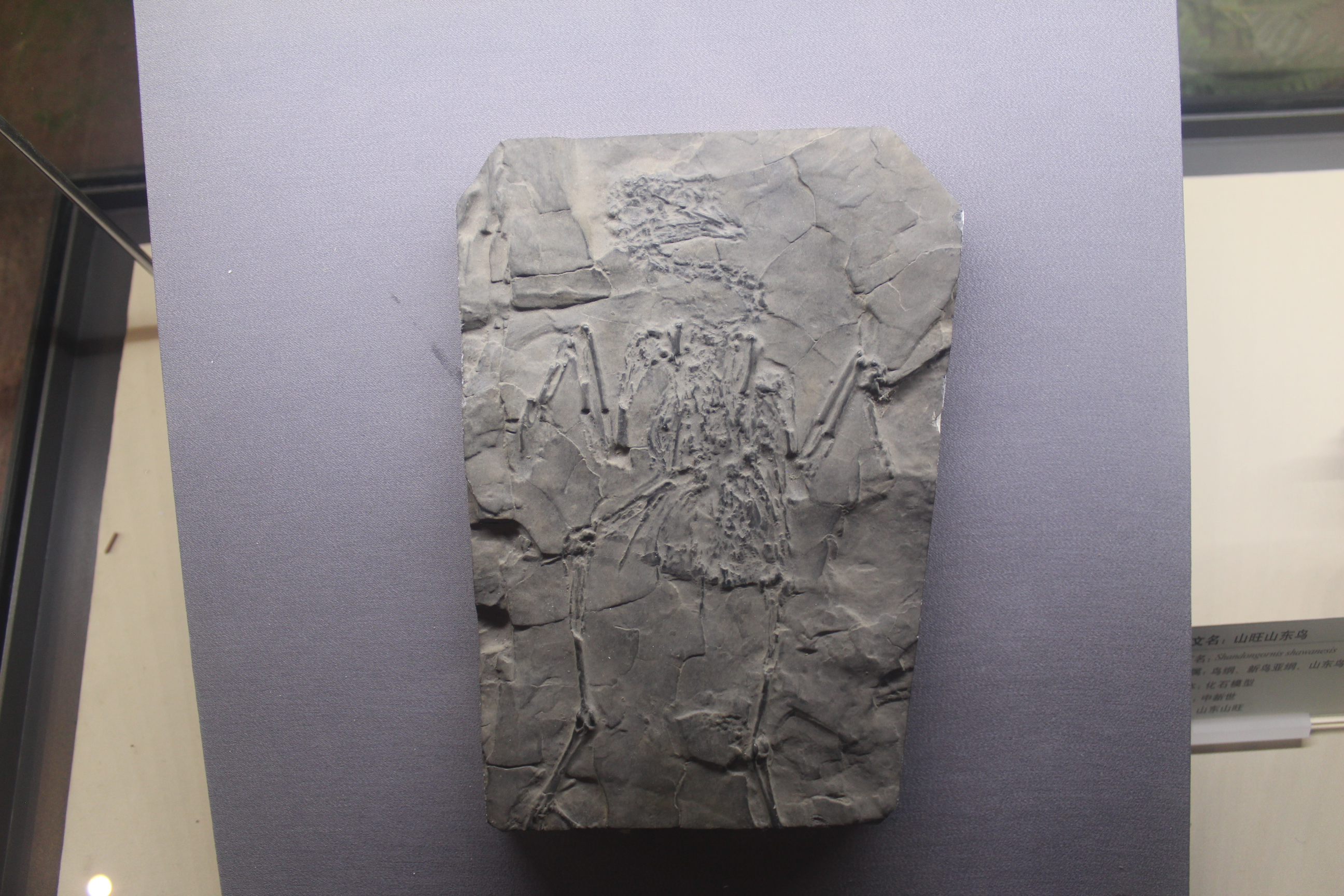
- Fossil specimen, Tianjin Natural History Museum

Scientific classification
- Domain: Eukaryota
- Kingdom: Animalia
- Phylum: Chordata
- Class: Aves
- Order: Galliformes
- Family: Phasianidae
- Subfamily: Phasianinae
- Genus: Shandongornis

= Shandongornis =

Extinct genus of birds

Shandongornis is an extinct genus of pheasants that lived during the Miocene within Shandong province, China.

== List of species ==
- S. shanwangensis
- S. yinanensis
