= Shanxiornis =

Shanxiornis Temporal range: Early Pleistocene ~2.58–1.8 Ma

Scientific classification
- Domain: Eukaryota
- Kingdom: Animalia
- Phylum: Chordata
- Class: Aves
- Order: Galliformes
- Family: Phasianidae
- Genus: †Shanxiornis; Wang, Zhao, Hu & Sun, 2006

Type species
- Shanxiornis fenyinis Wang, Hu & Sun, 2006

Extinct genus of Phasianidae

Shanxiornis is an extinct monotypic genus of pheasant-like bird. Its fossils were discovered in Early Pleistocene deposits of the Sanmen Formation, in the Shanxi Province of China. Its type and only known species is S. fenyinis.
