= Megacephalomana stygium =

Scientific classification
- Kingdom: Animalia
- Phylum: Arthropoda
- Clade: Pancrustacea
- Class: Insecta
- Order: Lepidoptera
- Superfamily: Noctuoidea
- Family: Erebidae
- Genus: Megacephalomana
- Species: M. stygium

Binomial name
- Megacephalomana stygium (Saalmüller, 1881)

Synonyms
- Megacephalom stygium Saalmüller, 1881

Species of moth

Megacephalomana stygium is a species of moth of the family Noctuidae (owlet moths). It is found in Madagascar.

This species has a big head, with bipectinated antennaes with a length of 2/3 of the forewings. Head and chest are black-brown, antennae darkbrown, forewings black-brown with some violet shine and 3 dented transversal lines. It has a wingspan of 46mm.
