= Miogallus =

Miogallus Temporal range: Miocene

Scientific classification
- Kingdom: Animalia
- Phylum: Chordata
- Class: Aves
- Order: Galliformes
- Family: Phasianidae
- Genus: †Miogallus; Lambrecht, 1933
- Species: †M. altus

Binomial name
- †Miogallus altus Milne-Edwards, 1869

Synonyms
- ?Miophasianus; Miogallus longaevus

Extinct genus of large pheasant

Miogallus is an extinct genus of large pheasant that lived during the Miocene of Europe. It contains a single species, Miogallus altus.

Miogallus altus is better known as Miophasianus altus found by Mlíkovský who found the genus Miophasianus Lambrech in 1933 to be a nomen nudum. Even if the genus name Miophasianus was made available later by Brodkorb, we agree with Mlikovský that Miogallus longaevus Lambrecht, 1933 is very probably a junior synonym of M. altus. As a consequence of the priority of Miogallus Lambrecht, 1933 over Miophasianus Brodkorb, 1952, the species must be named Miogallus altus.
