= Lophogallus =

Lophogallus Temporal range: Middle Miocene

Scientific classification
- Kingdom: Animalia
- Phylum: Chordata
- Class: Aves
- Order: Galliformes
- Family: Phasianidae
- Genus: †Lophogallus; Zelenkov & Kurochkin, 2010
- Species: †L. naranbulakensis

Binomial name
- †Lophogallus naranbulakensis Zelenkov & Kurochkin, 2010

Extinct species of bird

Lophogallus is a genus of prehistoric phasianid which is known from the Oshin Formation during the middle Miocene. It is known from the holotype humerus and a referred partial femur, both from the type locality of Naran Bulak, Mongolia. It was described by N. V. Zelenkov and E. N. Kurochkin in 2010, and the type species is Lophogallus naranbulakensis.
