= Palaealectoris =

Palaealectoris Temporal range: Early Miocene (Harrisonian) ~24.8–20.4 Ma

Scientific classification
- Kingdom: Animalia
- Phylum: Chordata
- Class: Aves
- Order: Galliformes
- Family: Phasianidae
- Tribe: Tetraonini
- Genus: †Palaealectoris; Wetmore, 1930
- Species: †P. incertus

Binomial name
- †Palaealectoris incertus Wetmore, 1930

Extinct genus of Plotopteridae

Palaealectoris is an extinct monotypic genus of landfowl, belonging to the family Phasianidae, distantly related to modern grouse. Its fossilized remains, found in the Marsland Formation, a part of the Agate Fossil Beds National Monument in Nebraska, and in the Calvert Formation in Maryland, are dated from the Early Miocene.

== History and etymology ==
The first remains associated with the genus, a fragmentary tibiotarsus, were collected in May 1925 in marine strata belonging to the Miocene-aged Calvert Formation, near Chesapeake Beach, Maryland, by Remington Kellogg and Norman Boss. The holotype remains of Palaealectoris were collected during the summer of 1928 by Erich Maren Schlaikjer in Lower Miocene deposits belonging to the Agate Fossil Beds in Sioux County, Nebraska. The genus was first described shortly after, in 1930, by Alexander Wetmore, at Schlaikjer's demand, based on the two extremities of a left humerus, with P. incertus as the type species. The Maryland remains were described as Palaealectoris sp.

== Description ==
Palaealectoris was a medium-sized landfowl, intermediate in size between the bobwhites and the spruce grouse. The superior crest of the humerus shared several similarities in development with that of the chachalacas, although this was probably a convergent adaptation. The general shape of the humerus is however sufficient to assign it to the family Phasianidae, although it represents an aberrant form.

The fragmentary tibiotarsus from the Calvert Formation associated with the genus was distinctly similar, although smaller, than that of the modern spruce grouse. It was similar in size to the holotype humerus of P. incertus, which justified its association with the genus.
