= Megalocoturnix =

Megalocoturnix Temporal range: Early Pliocene

Scientific classification
- Kingdom: Animalia
- Phylum: Chordata
- Class: Aves
- Order: Galliformes
- Family: Phasianidae
- Genus: †Megalocoturnix; Marco, 2009
- Species: †M. cordoni

Binomial name
- †Megalocoturnix cordoni Marco, 2009

Extinct genus of perdicine bird

Megalocoturnix is an extinct monotypic genus of perdicine bird that lived in the Iberian Peninsula during the Zanclean stage of the Pliocene epoch.

== Etymology ==
The generic name Megalocoturnix is derived from the Greek megalos, meaning very big, and the closely related genus Coturnix. The specific epithet of the type species, Megalocoturnix cordoni, honours the theoretical biologist Faustino Cordón.
