= Linquornis =

Linquornis Temporal range: Miocene

Scientific classification
- Domain: Eukaryota
- Kingdom: Animalia
- Phylum: Chordata
- Class: Aves
- Order: Galliformes
- Genus: †Linquornis
- Species: †L. gigantis

Binomial name
- †Linquornis gigantis Yeh 1980

Extinct genus of birds

Linquornis is a genus of peacock-sized Galliform bird that lived in Miocene of China; it consists one single species. Linquornis gigantis is the biggest bird fossil found in China.
