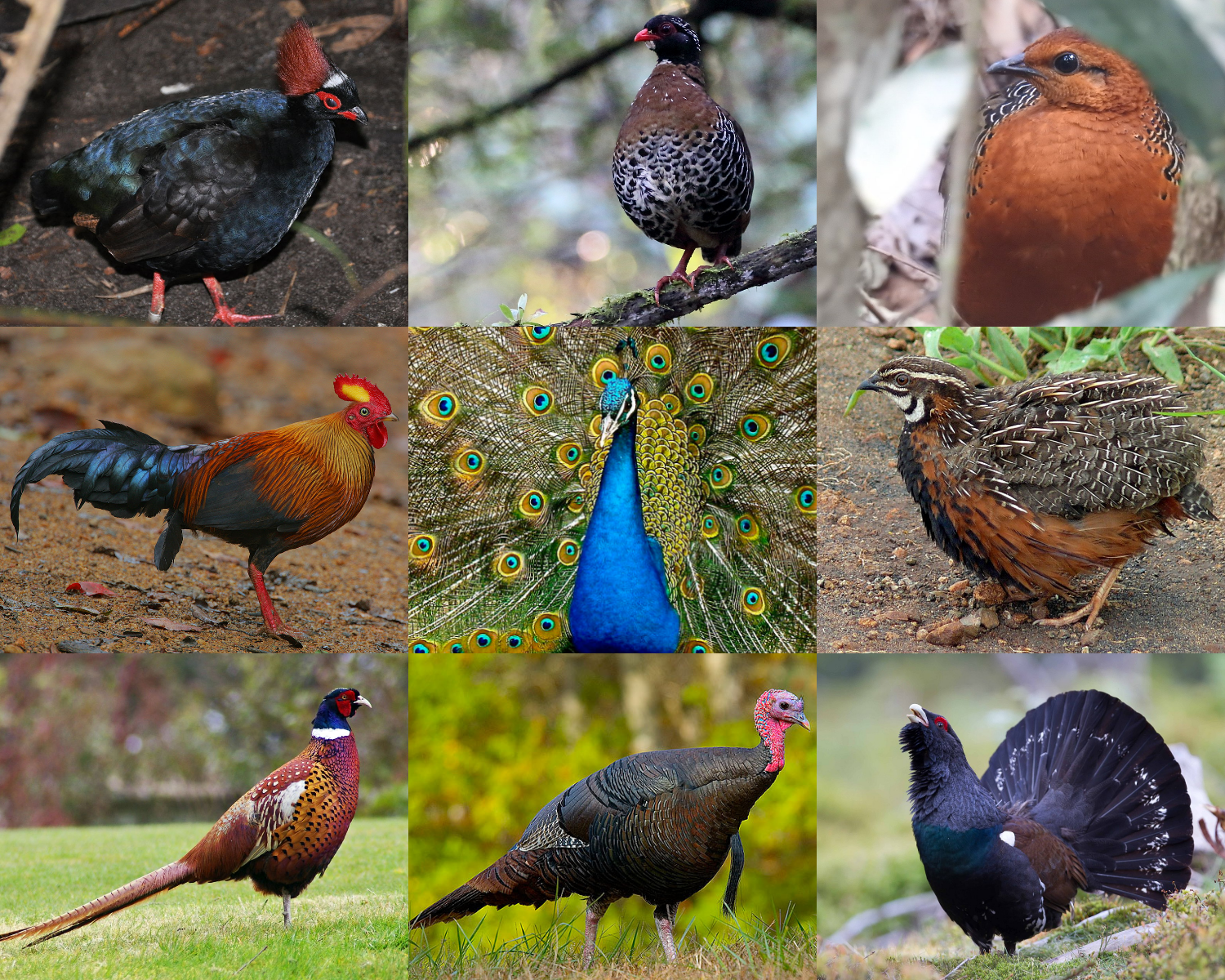
- Diversity of Phasianidae 1st row (Rollulinae): crested partridge, red-billed partridge, ferruginous partridge; 2nd row (Phasianinae "non-erectile clade"): Sri Lankan junglefowl, Indian peafowl, harlequin quail; 3rd row (Phasianinae "erectile clade"): common pheasant, wild turkey, western capercaillie

Scientific classification
- Kingdom: Animalia
- Phylum: Chordata
- Class: Aves
- Order: Galliformes
- Superfamily: Phasianoidea
- Family: Phasianidae; Horsfield, 1821

Type genus
- Phasianus Linnaeus, 1758

Subfamilies
- Phasianinae; Rollulinae

Synonyms
- Gallidae

= Phasianidae =

Phasianidae Temporal range: Oligocene–recent, 30–0 Ma

Family of birds

Phasianidae is a family of heavy-bodied, ground-living birds that includes junglefowls, pheasants, grouse, partridges, turkeys, Old World quail and peafowl, with 185 extant species divided into 54 genera. It was formerly broken up into two subfamilies, the Phasianinae and the Perdicinae, but this arrangement is now known to be paraphyletic and polyphyletic, respectively, and more recent evidence supports breaking it up into two subfamilies: Rollulinae and Phasianinae, with the latter containing two clades with multiple tribes. The New World quail (Odontophoridae) and guineafowl (Numididae) were formerly included in this family, but are now typically placed in families of their own; conversely, grouse and turkeys, formerly often treated as distinct families (Tetraonidae and Meleagrididae, respectively), are now known to be deeply nested within Phasianidae, so they are now included in the present family.

Phasianids include many of the most popular upland game birds. Domesticated red junglefowl (Gallus gallus domesticus) — commonly known as the chicken — is the most widespread poultry and the most abundant bird subspecies in the world, with global population exceeding 26.5 billion under husbandry by humans as of 2023.

== Description ==
Phasianids are terrestrial. They range in weight from 43 g (1.5 oz) in the case of the king quail to 6 kg (13 lb) in the case of the Indian peafowl. If turkeys are included, rather than classified as a separate family, then the considerably heavier wild turkey capably reaches a maximum weight of more than 17 kg (37 lb). Length in this taxonomic family can vary from 12.5 cm (4.9 in) in the king quail up to 300 cm (120 in) (including the elongated train) in green peafowl, thus they beat even the true parrots in length diversity within a family of birds. Generally, sexual dimorphism is greater in larger-sized birds, with males tending to be larger than females. They are generally plump, with broad, relatively short wings and powerful legs. Many have a spur on each leg, most prominently with junglefowl (including chickens), pheasants, turkeys, and peafowl. Some, like quails, partridges, and grouse, have reduced spurs to none at all. A few have two spurs on each of their legs instead of one, including peacock-pheasants and spurfowl. The bill is short and compact, particularly in species that dig deep in the earth for food such as the Mearns quail. Males of the bigger galliform species often boast brightly-coloured plumage, as well as facial ornaments such as combs, wattles, and/or crests.

== Distribution and habitat ==
The Phasianidae are mostly an Old World family, with a distribution that includes most of Europe and Asia (except the far north), all of Africa except the driest deserts, and south into much of eastern Australia and (formerly) New Zealand. The Meleagridini (turkeys) are native to the New World, while the Tetraonini (grouse) are circumpolar; both of these are members of Phasianinae. The greatest diversity of species is in Southeast Asia and Africa. The Congo peacock is specific to the African Congo.

Overall, Rollulinae is restricted to the tropics of East and Southeast Asia and the mountains of Tanzania, Phasianinae have a circumpolar range in the temperate zones of both Eurasia and North America (but also range into the tropics of east and southeast Asia), and Pavoninae have a wide range across Africa, Eurasia, and Australasia in both temperate and tropical zones.

The family is generally sedentary and resident, although some members of the group undertake long migrations, like ptarmigans and Old World quail. Several species in the family have been widely introduced around the world, particularly pheasants, which have been introduced to Europe, Australia, and the Americas, specifically for hunting purposes. Captive populations of peafowl, pheasants, domestic chickens, and turkeys have also escaped or been released and became feral, intermingling and even hybridizing with wild populations.

== Behaviour and ecology ==
The phasianids have a varied omnivorous diet, with foods consumed ranging from purely herbivorous selections of seeds, nuts, stems, leaves, shoots, flowers, fruits, bulbs, tubers, and roots, to carnivory including insects, larvae, slugs, spiders, reptiles, and even small mammals. Most species specialize either in feeding on plant matter or predating on tiny vertebrates, although the chicks of most species are insectivorous, preying on small invertebrates.

In addition to the variation in diet, a considerable amount of variation exists in breeding strategies among the Phasianidae. Compared to birds in general, a large number of species do not engage in monogamy (the typical breeding system of most birds). The francolins of Africa and some partridges are reportedly monogamous, but polygamy has been reported in the pheasants and junglefowl, some quail, and the breeding displays of peacocks have been compared to those of a lek. Nesting usually occurs on the ground; only the tragopans nest higher up in trees or stumps of bushes. Nests can vary from mounds of vegetation to slight scrapes in the ground. As many as 20 eggs can be laid in the nest, although 7–12 are the more usual numbers, with smaller numbers in tropical species. Incubation times can range from 14–30 days depending on the species, and is almost always done solely by the hen, although a few involve the male partaking in caring for the eggs and chicks, like the willow ptarmigan and bobwhite quail.

== Relationship with humans ==
The red junglefowl of Southeast Asia is the wild ancestor of the domesticated chicken, the most important bird in agriculture, and the wild turkey similarly is the ancestor of the domestic turkey. Several species of pheasants and partridges are extremely important to humans. Ring-necked pheasants, several partridge and quail species, and some francolins have been widely introduced and managed as game birds for hunting. Several species are threatened by human activities.

== Systematics and evolution ==
The clade Phasianidae is the largest of the branch Galliformes, comprising 185 species divided into 54 genera. This group includes the pheasants and partridges, junglefowl chickens, quail, and peafowl. Turkeys and grouse have also been recognized as having their origins in the pheasant- and partridge-like birds.

The family name comes from the genus Phasianus, its name comes from the Latin name for "pheasant" deriving from Ancient Greek φἀσιἀνος phāsiānos, meaning "(bird) of the Phasis", Phasis was the old name for the Rioni flowing downstream the east Colchian coast of the Black Sea (now western Georgia), where Argonauts set foot on its banks and found such birds there.

Until the early 1990s, this family was broken up into two subfamilies: the Phasianinae, including pheasants, tragopans, junglefowls, and peafowls; and the Perdicinae, including partridges, Old World quails, and francolins. Molecular phylogenies have shown that these two subfamilies are not each monophyletic, but actually constitute only one lineage with one common ancestor. For example, some partridges (genus Perdix) are more closely affiliated to pheasants, whereas Old World quails and partridges from the genus Alectoris are closer to junglefowls.

The earliest fossil records of phasianids date to the late Oligocene epoch, about 30 million years ago.

=== Recent genera ===
Taxonomy and ordering is based on Kimball et al., 2021, which was accepted by the International Ornithological Congress. Tribes and subfamily names are based on the 4th edition of the Howard and Moore Complete Checklist of the Birds of the World. Genera without a tribe are considered to belong to tribe incertae sedis.

- Subfamily Rollulinae
  - Xenoperdix Dinesen et al., 1994 (forest partridges)
  - Caloperdix Blyth, 1861 (ferruginous partridge)
  - Rollulus Bonnaterre, 1791 (crested partridges)
  - Melanoperdix Jerdon, 1864 (black partridge)
  - Arborophila Hodgson, 1837 (hill partridges)
- Subfamily Phasianinae
  - Phasianinae "Erectile clade"
    - Lerwa Hodgson, 1837 (snow partridge)
    - Ithaginis Wagler, 1832 (blood pheasant)
    - Tribe Lophophorini
      - Tragopan Cuvier, 1829 non Gray 1841 (tragopans)
      - Tetraophasis Elliot, 1871 (monal-partridges)
      - Lophophorus Temminck, 1813 non Agassiz 1846 (monals)
    - Pucrasia Gray, 1841 (koklass pheasant)
    - Tribe Tetraonini
      - Meleagris Linnaeus, 1758 (turkeys)
      - Bonasa Stephens, 1819 (ruffed grouse)
      - Tetrastes Keyserling & Blasius, 1840 (hazel grouse)
      - Centrocercus Swainson, 1832 (sage-grouse)
      - Dendragapus Elliot, 1864 (blue grouse)
      - Tympanuchus Gloger, 1841 (prairie-chickens and sharp-tailed grouse)
      - Lagopus Brisson, 1760 (ptarmigans)
      - Falcipennis Elliot, 1864 (Siberian grouse)
      - Canachites Stejneger, 1885 (spruce grouse)
      - Tetrao Linnaeus, 1758 (capercaillies)
      - Lyrurus Swainson, 1832 (black grouse)
    - Rhizothera Gray, 1841 (long-billed partridges)
    - Perdix Brisson, 1760 (true partridges)
    - Tribe Phasianini
      - Syrmaticus Wagler, 1832 (long-tailed pheasants)
      - Chrysolophus Gray, 1834 (ruffed pheasants)
      - Phasianus Linnaeus, 1758 (true pheasants)
      - Catreus Cabanis, 1851 (cheer pheasant)
      - Crossoptilon Hodgson, 1838 (eared pheasants)
      - Lophura Fleming, 1822 non Gray, 1827 non Walker, 1856 (gallopheasants)
  - Phasianinae "Nonerectile clade"
    - Tribe Pavonini
      - Rheinardia Maingonnat, 1882 (crested arguses)
      - Argusianus Rafinesque, 1815 (great argus)
      - Afropavo Chapin, 1936 (African peafowl)
      - Pavo Linnaeus, 1758 (Asiatic peafowl)
    - Polyplectron Temminck, 1807 (peacock-pheasants)
    - Galloperdix Blyth, 1845 (Indian spurfowls)
    - Tropicoperdix Blyth, 1859 (chestnut-necklaced and green-legged partridges)
    - Haematortyx Sharpe, 1879 (crimson-headed partridge)
    - Tribe Gallini
      - Bambusicola Gould, 1863 (bamboo partridges)
      - Gallus Brisson, 1760 (junglefowl, including the domestic chicken)
      - Peliperdix Bonaparte, 1856 (Latham's francolin)
      - Ortygornis Reichenbach, 1852 (certain francolins)
      - Francolinus Stephens, 1819 (certain francolins)
      - Campocolinus Crowe et al., 2020 (certain francolins)
      - Scleroptila Blyth, 1852 (certain francolins)
    - Tribe Coturnicini
      - Tetraogallus Gray, 1832 (snowcocks)
      - Ammoperdix Gould, 1851 (sand and see-see partridges)
      - Synoicus Bosc, 1792 (certain quails)
      - Margaroperdix Reichenbach, 1853 (Madagascar partridge)
      - Coturnix Garsault, 1764 (typical Old World quails)
      - Alectoris Kaup, 1829 (rock partridges)
      - Perdicula Hodgson, 1837 (bush-quails)
      - Ophrysia Bonaparte, 1856 (Himalayan quail)
      - Pternistis Wagler, 1832 (partridge-francolins; African spurfowls)

==== Past taxonomy ====
This is the paraphyletic former ordering of Phasianidae, which primarily grouped genera based on appearance and body plans.

- Subfamily Perdicinae Horsfield, 1821
  - Xenoperdix Dinesen et al., 1994 (forest partridges)
  - Caloperdix Blyth, 1861
  - Rollulus Bonnaterre, 1791 (crested partridges)
  - Melanoperdix Jerdon, 1864
  - Arborophila Hodgson, 1837 (hill partridges)
  - Rhizothera Gray, 1841
  - Lerwa Hodgson, 1837
  - Tropicoperdix Blyth, 1859
  - Ammoperdix Gould 1851 (see-see and sand partridges)
  - Synoicus Bosc 1792
  - Margaroperdix Reichenbach 1853
  - Coturnix Garsault 1764 (typical Old World quails)
  - Tetraogallus Gray 1832 (snowcocks)
  - Alectoris Kaup 1829 (rock partridges)
  - Pternistis Wagler 1832 (partridge-francolins; African spurfowls)
  - Ophrysia Bonaparte 1856
  - Perdicula Hodgson 1837 (bush-quails)
  - Bambusicola Gould 1863 (bamboo partridges)
  - Scleroptila Blyth 1852
  - Peliperdix Bonaparte 1856
  - Francolinus Stephens 1819 (true francolins)
  - Ortygornis Reichenbach, 1852
  - Campocolinus Crowe et al 2020
  - Perdix Brisson, 1760 (true partridges)
  - Haematortyx Sharpe, 1879
  - Galloperdix Blyth, 1845 (Indian spurfowls)
  - Tetraophasis Elliot, 1871 (monal-partridges)
- Subfamily Meleagridinae
  - Meleagris Linnaeus, 1758 (turkeys)
- Subfamily Phasianinae (pheasants, peafowl, junglefowl, monals, and tragopans)
  - Polyplectron Temminck, 1807 (peacock-pheasants)
  - Gallus Brisson, 1760 (junglefowl, including the domestic chicken)
  - Ithaginis Wagler, 1832
  - Pucrasia Gray, 1841 (koklass pheasant)
  - Tragopan Cuvier, 1829 non Gray 1841 (tragopans)
  - Lophophorus Temminck, 1813 non Agassiz, 1846 (monals)
  - Rheinardia Maingonnat 1882
  - Argusianus Rafinesque 1815 (argus pheasants)
  - Afropavo Chapin, 1936 (African peafowl)
  - Pavo Linnaeus, 1758 (Asiatic peafowl)
  - Syrmaticus Wagler, 1832 (long-tailed pheasants)
  - Phasianus Linnaeus, 1758 (true pheasants)
  - Chrysolophus Gray, 1834 (ruffed pheasants)
  - Lophura Fleming, 1822 non Gray, 1827 non Walker, 1856 (gallopheasants)
  - Catreus Cabanis, 1851
  - Crossoptilon Hodgson, 1838 (eared pheasants)
- Subfamily Tetraoninae (grouse)
  - Bonasa Stephens, 1819 (ruffed grouse)
  - Tetrastes Keyserling & Blasius, 1840 (hazel grouse)
  - Centrocercus Swainson 1832 (sage-grouse)
  - Dendragapus Elliot, 1864 (blue grouse)
  - Tympanuchus Gloger, 1841 (prairie-chickens and sharp-tailed grouse)
  - Lagopus Brisson, 1760 (ptarmigans)
  - Falcipennis Elliot, 1864 (Siberian grouse)
  - Canachites Stejneger, 1885 (spruce grouse)
  - Tetrao Linnaeus, 1758 (capercaillies)
  - Lyrurus Swainson, 1832 (black grouse)

=== Fossil genera ===
Extinct genus assignment follows the Mikko's Phylogeny Archive and Paleofile.com websites.

- †Alectoris" pliocaena Tugarinov, 1940
- †Bantamyx Kuročkin, 1982
- †Centuriavis Ksepka, Early, Dzikiewicz & Balanoff, 2022
- †Diangallus Hou, 1985
- †"Gallus" beremendensis Jánossy, 1976
- †"Gallus" europaeus Harrison, 1978
- †Lophogallus Zelenkov & Kuročkin, 2010
- †Megalocoturnix Sánchez Marco, 2009
- †Miophasianus Brodkorb, 1952 [Miophasianus Lambrecht 1933 nomen nudum; Miogallus Lambrecht 1933]
- †Palaeocryptonyx Depéret, 1892 [Chauvireria Boev 1997; Pliogallus Tugarinov 1940b non Gaillard 1939; Lambrechtia Janossy, 1974 ]
- †Palaeortyx Milne-Edwards, 1869 [Palaeoperdix Milne-Edwards, 1869]
- †Panraogallus Li et al., 2018
- †Plioperdix Kretzoi, 1955 [Pliogallus Tugarinov 1940 non Gaillard 1939]
- †Rustaviornis Burchak-Abramovich & Meladze, 1972
- †Schaubortyx Brodkorb, 1964
- †Shandongornis Yeh, 1997
- †Shanxiornis Wang et al., 2006
- †Tologuica Zelenkov & Kuročkin, 2009
- Tribe Tetraonini (grouse)
  - †Palaealectoris Wetmore, 1930
  - †Proagriocharis Martin & Tate, 1970
  - †Rhegminornis Wetmore, 1943

=== Phylogeny ===
Cladogram based on a 2021 study by De Chen and collaborators that sequenced DNA flanking ultra-conserved elements. The extinct Himalayan quail (genus Ophrysia) was not included in the study. The species numbers and the inclusion of the genera Canachites, Ortygornis, Campocolinus and Synoicus follows the list maintained by Frank Gill, Pamela Rasmussen and David Donsker on behalf of the International Ornithologists' Union.

- Phasianidae
  - - Xenoperdix – forest partridges (2 species)
    - - Arborophila – forest partridges (19 species)
      - - Caloperdix – ferruginous partridge
        - - Rollulus – crested partridge
          - Melanoperdix – black partridge
  - - - Lerwa – snow partridge
      - - Ithaginis – blood pheasant
        - - - Tragopan – horned pheasants
            - - Tetraophasis – monal-partridges (2 species)
              - Lophophorus – monals (3 species)
          - - Rhizothera – partridges (2 species)
            - - - Pucrasia – koklass pheasant
                - - Meleagris – turkeys (2 species)
                  - - Bonasa – ruffed grouse
                    - - Tetrastes – grouse (2 species)
                      - - - Centrocercus – sage-grouse (2 species)
                          - - Dendragapus – grouse (2 species)
                            - Tympanuchus – prairie chickens (3 species)
                        - - Lagopus – ptarmigans (3 species)
                          - - Falcipennis – Siberian grouse
                            - - Canachites – spruce grouse
                              - - Tetrao – capercaillies (2 species)
                                - Lyrurus – grouse (2 species)
              - - Perdix – true partridges (3 species)
                - - Syrmaticus – long-tailed pheasants (5 species)
                  - - Chrysolophus – pheasants (2 species)
                    - - Phasianus – pheasants (2 species)
                      - - Catreus – cheer pheasant
                        - - Crossoptilon – eared pheasants (4 species)
                          - Lophura – gallopheasants (9 species)
    - - - - - Rheinardia – crested argus
            - Argusianus – great argus
          - - Afropavo – Congo peafowl
            - Pavo – peafowls (2 species)
        - - Tropicoperdix – partridges (2 species)
          - - Haematortyx – crimson-headed partridge
            - - Galloperdix – spurfowl (3 species)
              - Polyplectron – peacock-pheasants (8 species)
      - - - - Bambusicola – bamboo partridges (3 species)
            - Gallus – junglefowl (4 species)
          - - - Peliperdix – Latham's francolin
              - Ortygornis – francolins (3 species)
            - - Francolinus – francolins (3 species)
              - - Campocolinus – francolins (3 species)
                - Scleroptila – francolins (7 species)
        - - Tetraogallus – snowcocks (5 species)
          - - - Ammoperdix – desert partridges (2 species)
              - - Synoicus – dwarf quails (4 species)
                - - Margaroperdix – Madagascar partridge
                  - Coturnix – quails (6 species)
            - - Alectoris – rock partridges (7 species)
              - - Perdicula – bush quails (4 species)
                - Pternistis – spurfowl (24 species)
