= Rustaviornis =

Rustaviornis Temporal range: Early Miocene ~8.7–7.75 Ma

Scientific classification
- Domain: Eukaryota
- Kingdom: Animalia
- Phylum: Chordata
- Class: Aves
- Order: Galliformes
- Family: Phasianidae
- Genus: †Rustaviornis; Burchak-Abramovich & Meladze, 1972

Type species
- Rustaviornis georgicus Burchak-Abramovich & Meladze, 1972

Extinct genus of Phasianidae

Rustaviornis is an extinct monotypic genus of pheasant-like bird. Its remains were discovered in Miocene-aged sediments near Rustavi, in Eastern Georgia.

== History and etymology ==
The genus Rustaviornis was erected in 1972 by Burchak-Abramovich and Meladze, based on a single distal fragment of a tibiotarsal bone, found in the right bank of the Kura, near the town of Rustavi, in modern Georgia, that was at the time a Union Republic of the USSR.

The genus name, Rustaviornis, is formed by the prefix Rustavi-, referring to the town of Rustavi near which it was found, and the suffix -ornis, meaning "bird".

== Description ==
Rustaviornis is only known after a single and fragmentary holotype tibiotarsus, sharing similarities with those of modern-day pheasants and black grouse, although it was much larger, reaching the size of that of the modern junglefowl.

== Paleoecology ==
During the Early Miocene, the Iagluja locality, as well as several other sites in the area, was populated by a typical European Hipparion fauna, such as a Mediterranean tortoise, an undeterminate rodent, a badger, the skunk Promephitis, the hyenas Ictitherium and Adcrocuta, a saber-toothed cat, the early elephant Choerolophodon pentelicus, the namesake horse Hipparion cf. eldaricum, a chalicothere, the rhinoceros Dicerorhinus and Aceratherium, the hog Microstonyx, the deer Procapreolus, the giraffid Palaeotragus, and the bovids Oioceros, Paraoioceros and Tragocerus.
