= Sobniogallus =

Sobniogallus Temporal range: Rupelian

Scientific classification
- Kingdom: Animalia
- Phylum: Chordata
- Class: Aves
- Order: Galliformes
- Genus: Sobniogallus
- Species: S. albinojamrozi

Binomial name
- Sobniogallus albinojamrozi Tomek et al., 2014

Extinct genus of birds

Sobniogallus is an extinct genus of galliform bird that inhabited Poland during the Rupelian stage of the Oligocene epoch. It is a monotypic genus known from the species S. albinojamrozi.
