= Chauvireria =

Chauvireria Temporal range: Early Pleistocene (Middle Villafranchian) ~2.58–1.8 Ma

Scientific classification
- Kingdom: Animalia
- Phylum: Chordata
- Class: Aves
- Order: Galliformes
- Family: Phasianidae
- Subfamily: Pavoninae
- Genus: †Chauvireria; Boev, 1997

Type species
- Chauvireria balcanica Boev, 1997

Other species
- Chauvireria bulgarica Boev, 2020; Chauvireria minor (Janossy,1974)

Extinct genus of birds

Chauvireria is an extinct genus of small-sized landfowl, belonging to the family Phasianidae, and closely related to modern partridges, Old World quails and francolins. Two species are known from the genus: C. balcanica, the type species, and C. bulgarica. Both species lived in what is today Western Bulgaria during the Early Pleistocene.

== History and etymology ==
The first remains associated with the genus were collected between July 1990 and September 1993; the holotype was collected in August 1993 by Zlatozar Boev in a ponor near Varshets, in northwestern Bulgaria. These 1160 fossilized bones, belonging to at least 49 individuals, were described by Boev in 1997 under the name Chauvireria balcanica. In 2020, Boev described another species, C. bulgarica, after 54 fossilized bones belonging to at least 4 individuals, discovered in 1993 by the author himself in a landfill near Slivnitsa.

The genus name, Chauvireria, honours French paleontologist Cécile Mourer-Chauviré.

== Species ==
=== C. balcanica ===
Chauvireria balcanica, the type species of the genus, was quite abundant in its environment, representing 85% of the fossil remains in the Varshets locality. It is known after at least 45 individuals.

Its specific name, balcanica, refers to the Balkan Mountains in which it was found.

=== C. bulgarica ===
C. bulgarica remains were discovered in a cave landfill exposed by stone exploitation near Slivnitsa, in Bulgaria. It is slightly more recent and smaller than the type species. It is known after at least four individuals. The scapula featured a dorsally directed acromion, longer and more upright than that of C. balcanica. The coracoid had a thinner humeral region, and the humerus had a wider condylus dorsalis.

The specific name, bulgarica, refers to Bulgaria, its country of origin.

In 2024 three other species have been included in genus Chauvireria: Chauvireria egorovkensis Zelenkov, 2024 from the Late Miocene of Ukraine, Chauvireria axaina Zelenkov, 2024 from the Late Miocene of the south of European Russia and probably Late Miocene to Early Pliocene of Ukraine, and Chauvireria minor (Janossy,1974) from the Late Pliocene of Poland and Central Asia (Mongolia and Transbaikalia).

== Paleoecology ==
Chauvireria was locally abundant, representing nearly 85% of the fossil avifauna in the Varshets locality. It is speculated that this abundance in the fossil record may be due to the prevalence of the genus in the alimentation of the large eagle owls suspected to be the reason for the accumulation of bones in both localities, that were during the Early Pleistocene parts of cave systems, that may have been used as an eyrie for these nocturnal raptors.

During the Middle Villafranchian, the Varshets locality in which C. balcanica was discovered was a forested environment. The slightly younger C. bulgarica lived in a more open environment, dominated by xerophytic vegetation. Slivnitsa was much drier than Varshets, and represents the first environmental changes caused by the global cooling at the beginning of the Pleistocene. Boev links the extinction of both species of the genus to those wider changes.
