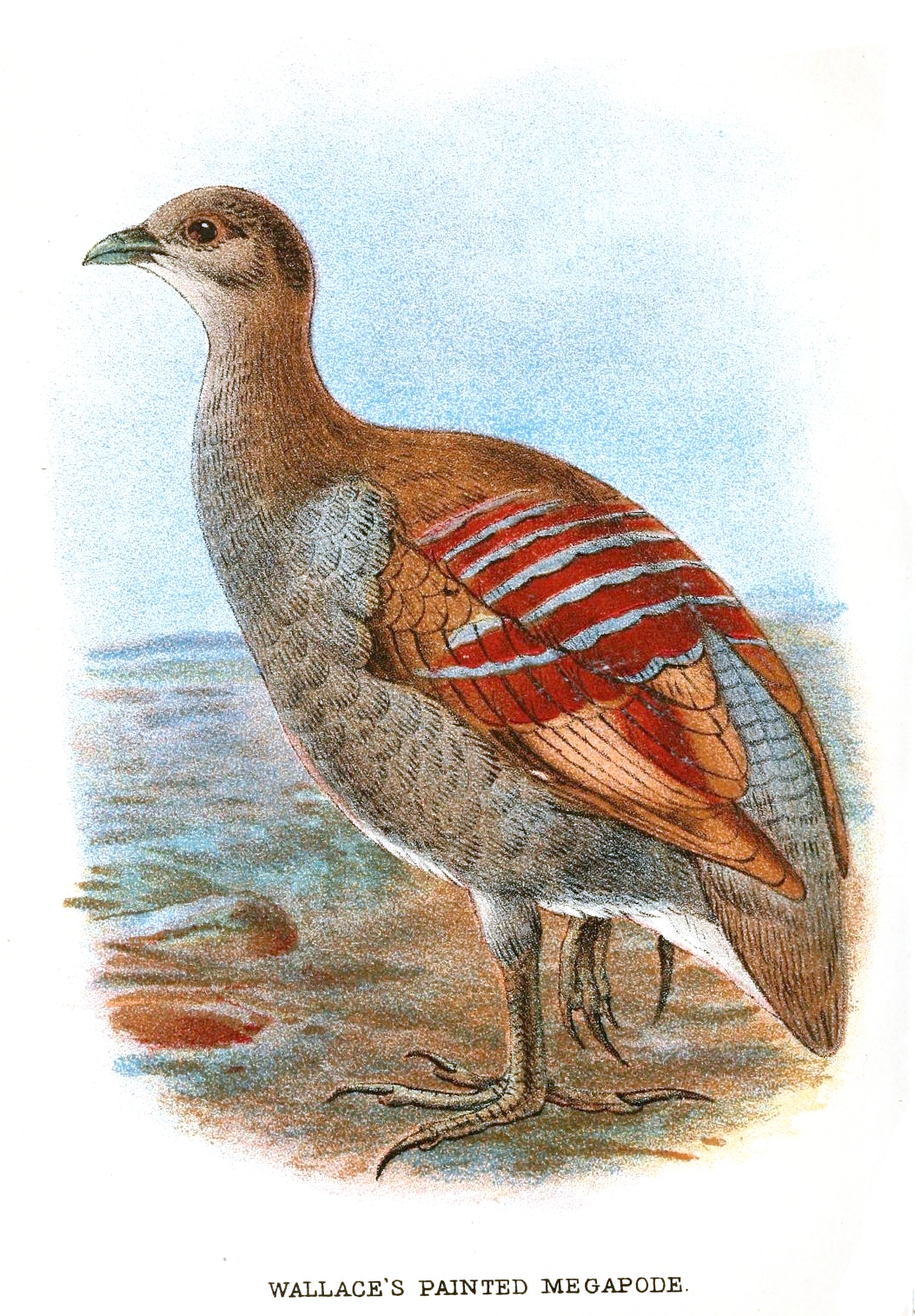

Conservation status
- Vulnerable (IUCN 3.1)

Scientific classification
- Kingdom: Animalia
- Phylum: Chordata
- Class: Aves
- Order: Galliformes
- Family: Megapodiidae
- Genus: Eulipoa; Ogilvie-Grant, 1893
- Species: E. wallacei

Binomial name
- Eulipoa wallacei (Gray, GR, 1861)

= Moluccan megapode =

Species of bird

The Moluccan megapode (Eulipoa wallacei), also known as Wallace's scrubfowl, Moluccan scrubfowl or painted megapode, is a small, approximately 31 cm long, olive-brown megapode. The genus Eulipoa is monotypic, but the Moluccan megapode is sometimes placed in Megapodius instead. Both sexes are similar with an olive-brown plumage, bluish-grey below, white undertail coverts, brown iris, bare pink facial skin, bluish-yellow bill and dark olive legs. There are light grey stripes on reddish-maroon feathers on its back. The young has brownish plumage, a black bill, legs and hazel iris.

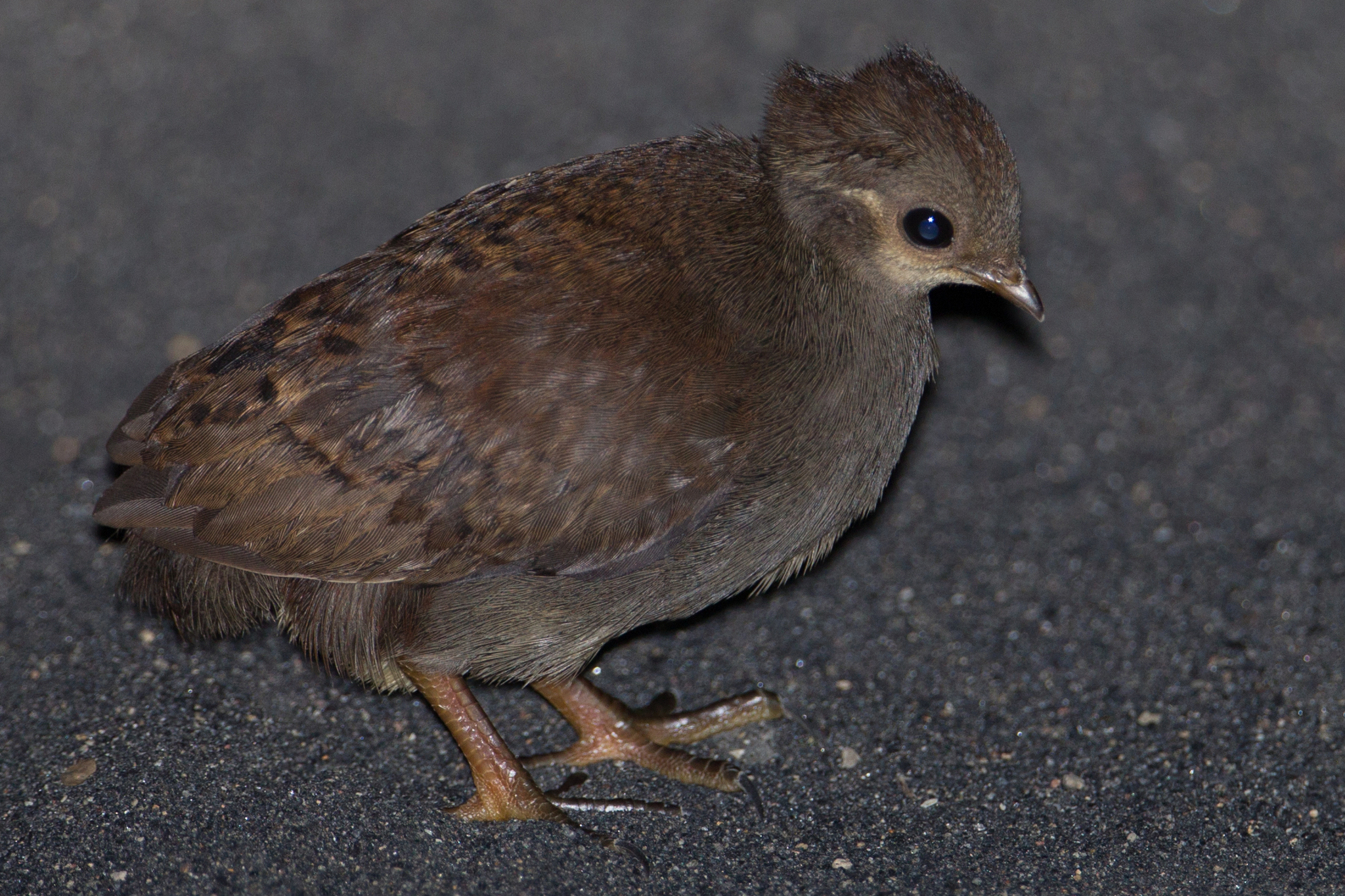
Juvenile

== Distribution and habitat ==
An Indonesian endemic, the Moluccan megapode is confined to hill and mountain forests on the Maluku Islands of Halmahera, Buru, Seram, Ambon, Ternate, Haruku, and Bacan. It is also found on Misool Island in West Papua province.

== Behaviour ==
The Moluccan megapode is the only megapode known to lay its eggs nocturnally. The nesting grounds are usually located in sun-exposed beach or volcanic soils.

== Conservation status ==
Due to ongoing habitat loss, limited range and overhunting in some areas, the Moluccan megapode is evaluated as Vulnerable on the IUCN Red List of Threatened Species.
