= Megacephalomana rivulosum =

Scientific classification
- Kingdom: Animalia
- Phylum: Arthropoda
- Clade: Pancrustacea
- Class: Insecta
- Order: Lepidoptera
- Superfamily: Noctuoidea
- Family: Erebidae
- Genus: Megacephalomana
- Species: M. rivulosum

Binomial name
- Megacephalomana rivulosum (Saalmüller, 1880)

Synonyms
- Megacephalom rivulosum Saalmüller, 1881

Species of moth

Megacephalomana rivulosum is a species of moth of the family Noctuidae (owlet moths). It is found in Madagascar.

Forewings, head and thorax of this species are violet-brown, hindwings and abdomen a little more greyish. It has 4 pale traversal lines. It has a wingspan of 46mm.
