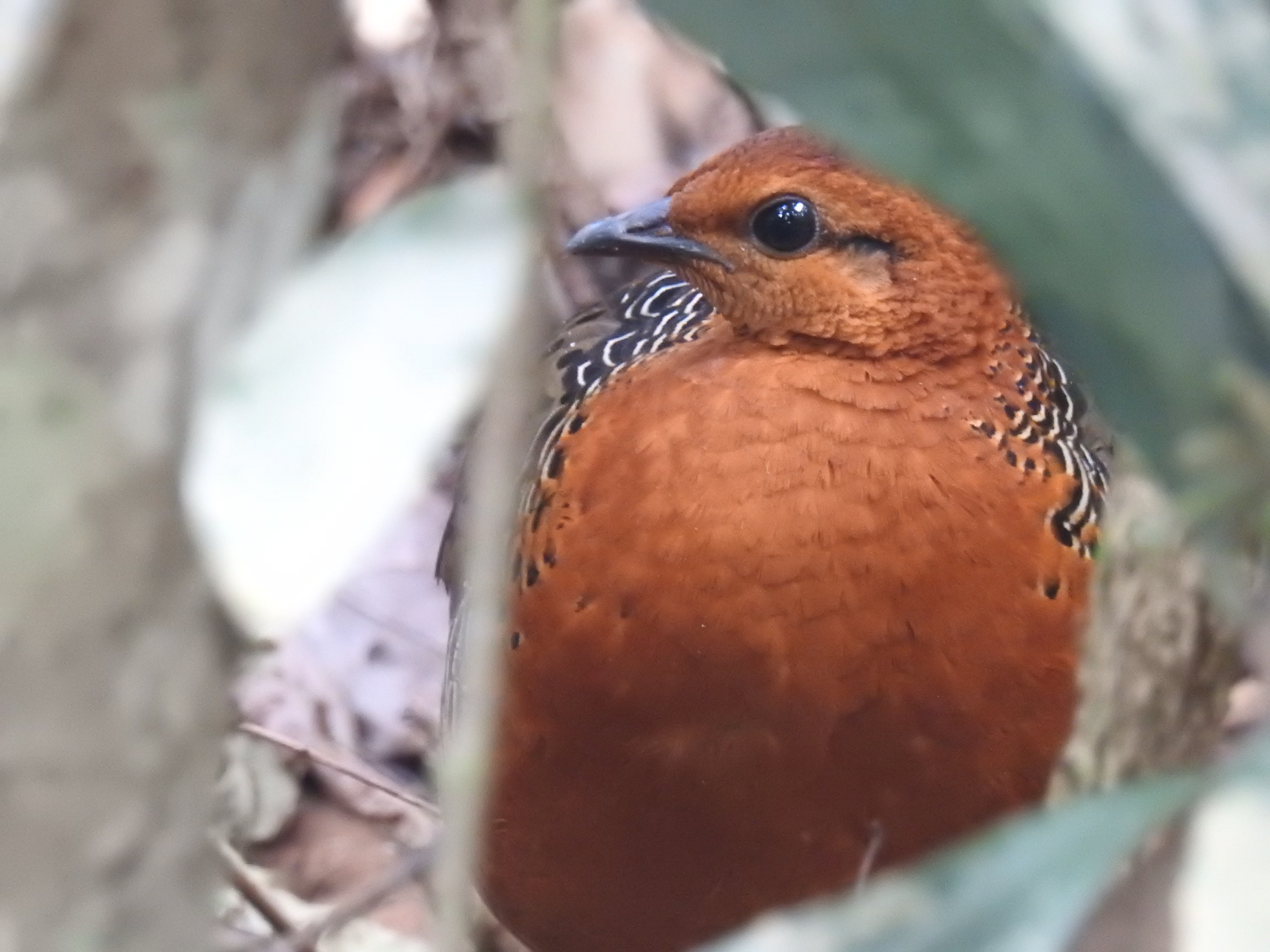

Conservation status
- Near Threatened (IUCN 3.1)

Scientific classification
- Kingdom: Animalia
- Phylum: Chordata
- Class: Aves
- Order: Galliformes
- Family: Phasianidae
- Subfamily: Rollulinae
- Genus: Caloperdix; Blyth, 1861
- Species: C. oculeus

Binomial name
- Caloperdix oculeus (Temminck, 1815)

= Ferruginous partridge =

Species of bird

The ferruginous partridge (Caloperdix oculeus) is a species of bird in the family Phasianidae. It belongs to the monotypical genus Caloperdix. It is found in Indonesia, Malaysia, Myanmar, and Thailand.

== Taxonomy ==
The ferruginous partridge was originally described by Coenraad Jacob Temminck in 1815, who described it as Perdix oculea. The specific name oculea is a reference to the Latin oculus for eyes, meaning that it was full of eyes or dotted with coloured spots. The species was moved to the monotypic genus Caloperdix in 1861 by Edward Blyth. The generic name is derived from the Ancient Greek kalos for beautiful and perdikos for partridge.

The ferruginous partridge has three recognized subspecies:

- C. o. borneensis (Ogilvie-Grant, 1892)
- C. o. ocellatus (Raffles, 1822)
- C. o. oculeus (Temminck, 1815)

== Distribution and habitat ==
The ferruginous partridge is found in a variety of habitats, including tropical dry forest and tropical moist lowland forest, secondary scrub and secondary bamboo growth. It is found from sea-level to 1,200 m (3,900 ft).

The ferruginous partridge ranges from southern Myanmar through the Kra Isthmus into the Malay Peninsula, as well as Borneo and Sumatra.

== Description ==
The ferruginous partridge measures from 27 to 32 cm (11–13 in) in length and weighs between 191–230 g (6.7–8.1 oz). The plumage is distinctive, having a rufous head, breast and belly and black scaled with white upper back and sides of breast and flanks. The wings are brown with black spots, and the rest of the back is black scaled with rufous. The sexes are similar except the male has two spurs and the female just one.

== Behaviour ==
The ferruginous partridge forages in small pairs or alone for seeds, fruits, grasses and insects. Very little is known about its breeding behaviour; the clutch size is 8-10 pure white eggs laid in a domed nest.

== Status ==
The ferruginous partridge is believed to be declining across its range due to habitat loss, and has therefore been assessed as near threatened with extinction.
