= Scopelortyx =

Scopelortyx Temporal range: Bartonian

Scientific classification
- Kingdom: Animalia
- Phylum: Chordata
- Class: Aves
- Order: Galliformes
- Family: †Paraortygidae
- Genus: †Scopelortyx
- Species: †S. klinghardtensis

Binomial name
- †Scopelortyx klinghardtensis Mourer-Chauviré, Pickford, & Senut

Extinct genus of birds

Scopelortyx is an extinct genus of paraortygid birds that lived during the Eocene epoch.

== Distribution ==
Scopelortyx klinghardtensis is known from the Eocliff locality of Namibia.
