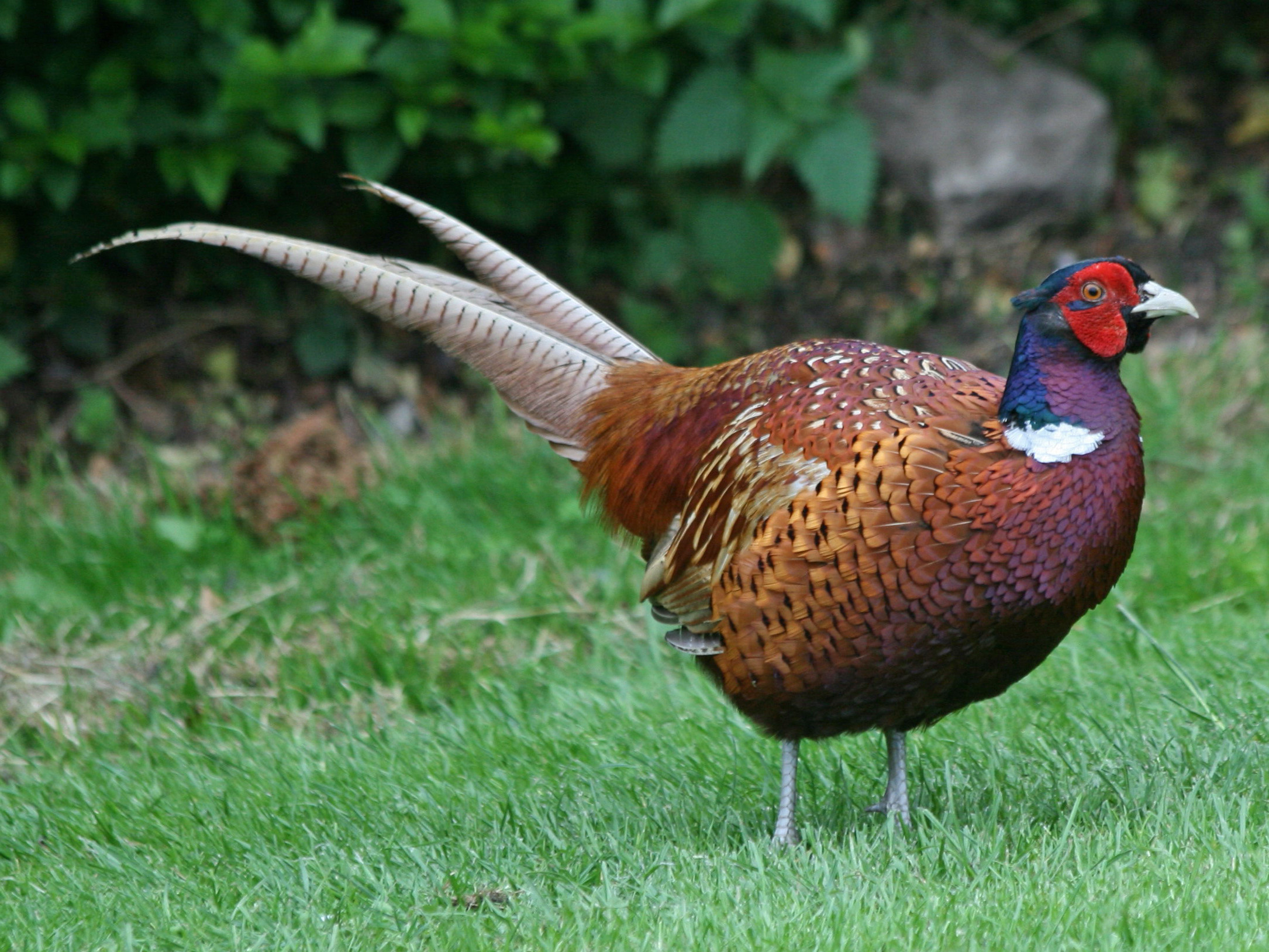
- Male common pheasant in Scotland

Scientific classification
- Kingdom: Animalia
- Phylum: Chordata
- Class: Aves
- Order: Galliformes
- Superfamily: Phasianoidea; Vigors, 1825

Families
- Numididae; Odontophoridae; Phasianidae

= Phasianoidea =

Superfamily of birds

Phasianoidea is a superfamily of birds of the order of the Galliformes.

== Taxonomy ==
=== Description ===
The superfamily was described in 1825 by the Irish zoologist Nicholas Aylward Vigors.

=== Etymology ===
The name Phasianoidea is formed by the union of the elements of scientific Latin Phasian- and -oidea. The first is the genitive root of the name of its type genus, Phasianus; and the second is the ending -oidea, neutral plural of -oideus, derived from ancient Greek εἴδος eidos, 'aspect', 'appearance', 'form', with the union vowel -o-, used in the formation of numerous names of orders and superfamilies of animals. Literally: 'those who look like pheasants'.
