= Plioperdix =

Plioperdix Temporal range: Neogene

Scientific classification
- Kingdom: Animalia
- Phylum: Chordata
- Class: Aves
- Order: Galliformes
- Family: Phasianidae
- Genus: †Plioperdix; Kretzoi, 1955

Species
- Plioperdix ponticus; Plioperdix africana; Plioperdix hungarica?

Extinct genus of birds

Plioperdix is an extinct genus of phasianid that lived during the Neogene period.

== Distribution ==
Plioperdix ponticus inhabited Moldova and southern Ukraine during the Zanclean and Transbaikalia and Mongolia during the Piacenzian. P. africana inhabited Morocco during the Piacenzian. P. hungarica is known from the Late Miocene of Hungary and Russia, though its validity as a species of Plioperdix has been questioned.
