= Megacephalomana =

Scientific classification
- Domain: Eukaryota
- Kingdom: Animalia
- Phylum: Arthropoda
- Class: Insecta
- Order: Lepidoptera
- Superfamily: Noctuoidea
- Family: Erebidae
- Subfamily: Calpinae
- Genus: Megacephalomana; Strand, 1943

Synonyms
- Megacephalon Saalmüller, 1880

Genus of moths

Megacephalomana is a genus of moths of the family Erebidae. The genus was described by Strand in 1943.

This name and Megacephalon are considered by The Global Lepidoptera Names Index to be a synonyms of Facidia Walker, 1865.

== Species ==
Some species of this genus are:

- Megacephalomana divisa (Walker, 1865) Sri Lanka
- Megacephalomana laportei Berio, 1974 Zaire
- Megacephalomana pilosum (Pagenstecher, 1888) Amboina
- Megacephalomana remaudi Laporte, 1972 Congo, Gabon
- Megacephalomana rivulosum (Saalmüller, 1880) Madagascar
- Megacephalomana saalmuelleri (Viette, 1965) Madagascar
- Megacephalomana stygium (Saalmüller, 1881) Madagascar
