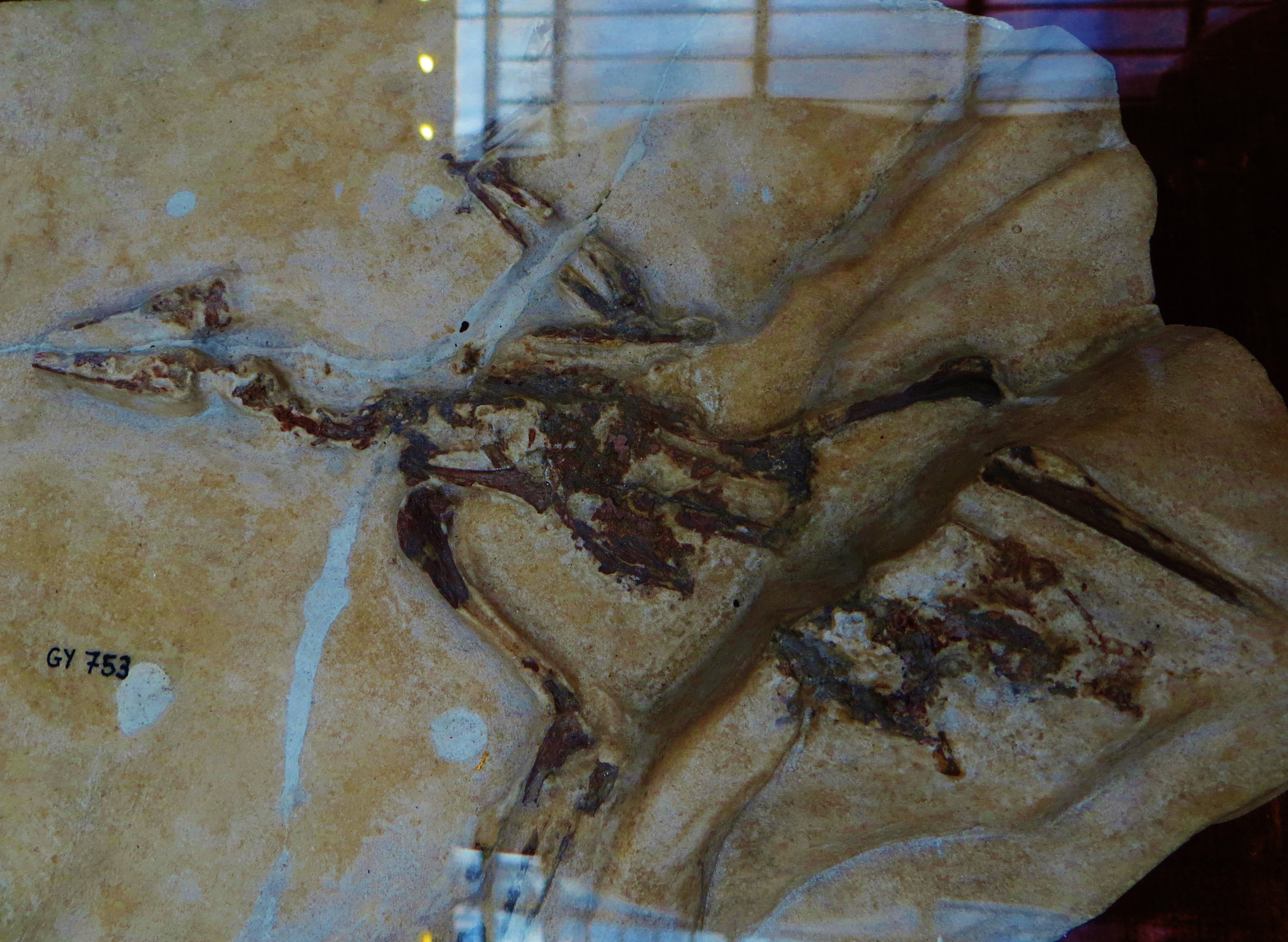
- Fossil at Musee d'Histoire Naturelle, Paris

Scientific classification
- Kingdom: Animalia
- Phylum: Chordata
- Class: Aves
- Order: Galliformes
- Family: Phasianidae
- Genus: †Palaeortyx; Milne-Edwards, 1869

Species
- Palaeortyx caluxyensis; Palaeortyx edwardsi; Palaeortyx gallica; Palaeortyx intermedia; Palaeortyx major; Palaeortyx miocaena

= Palaeortyx =

Palaeortyx Temporal range: Middle Oligocene to Early Pleistocene

Extinct genus of birds

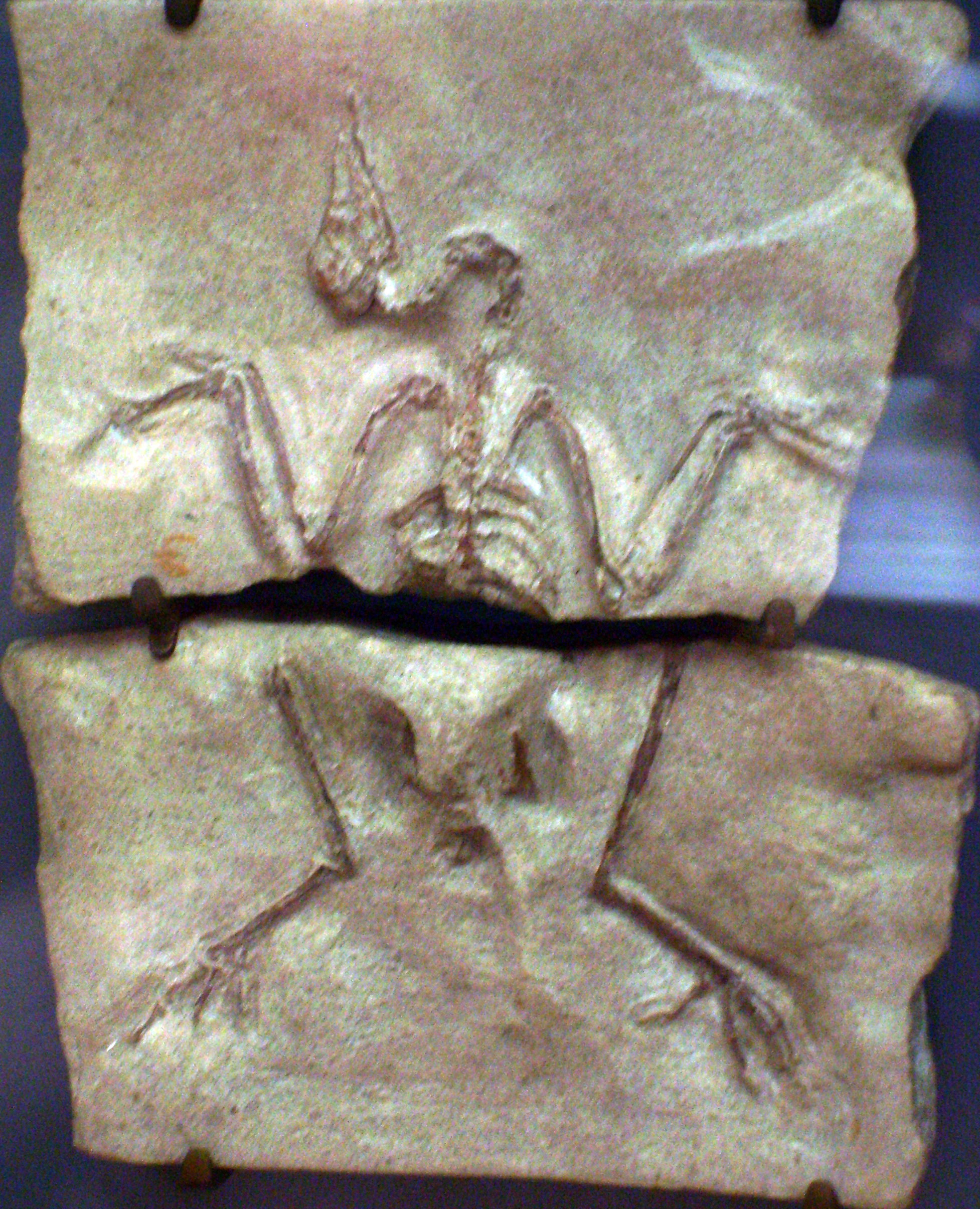
Fossil in Muséum national d'histoire naturelle, Paris

Palaeortyx is an extinct genus of granivorous galliform bird that lived 28.4 to 2.588 million years ago. It lived from the early Eocene to the early Pliocene, and may be a phasianid or odontophorid. It is known from several fossils found in Germany, France, Italy, Hungary and Romania.
