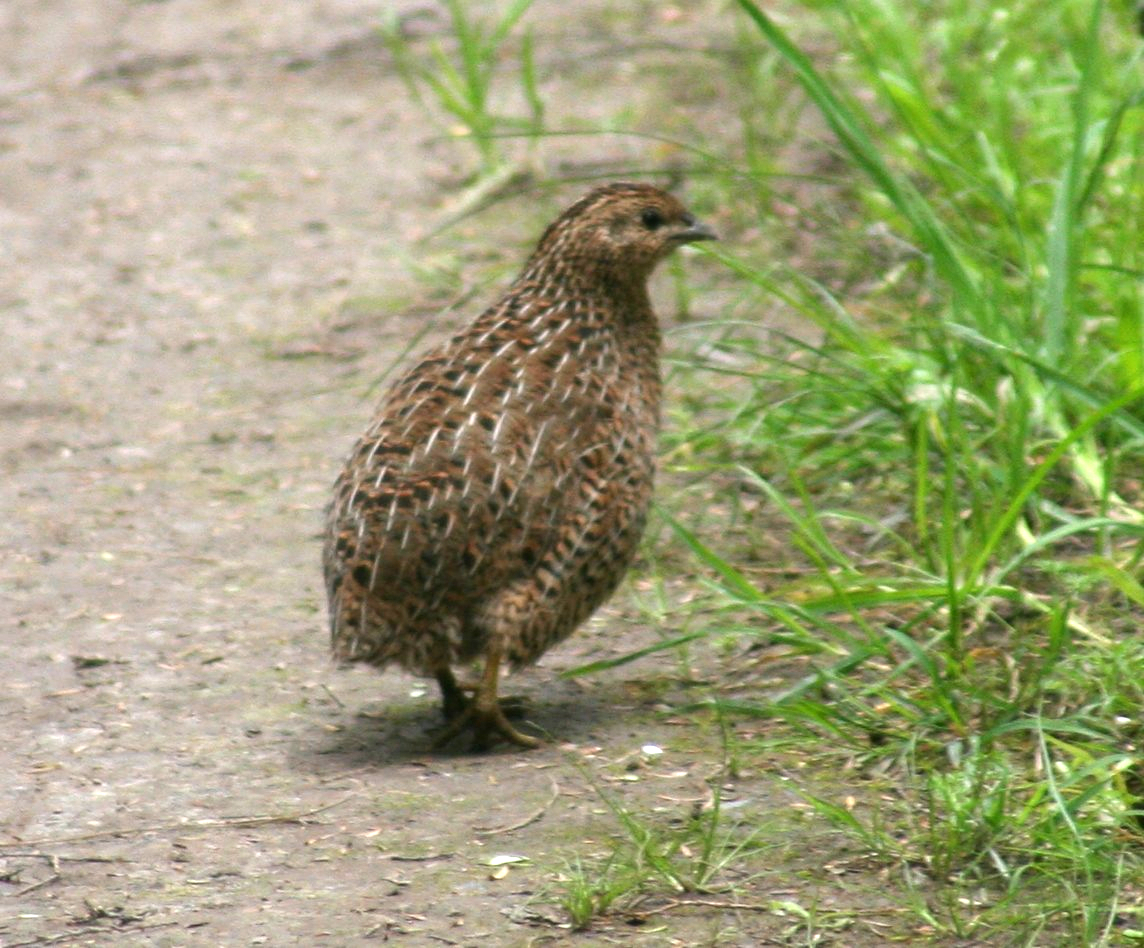
- Brown quail, Synoicus ypsilophorus

Scientific classification
- Kingdom: Animalia
- Phylum: Chordata
- Class: Aves
- Order: Galliformes
- Family: Phasianidae
- Subfamily: Phasianinae
- Tribe: Coturnicini

Groups included
- Coturnix; Ophrysia; Perdicula; Synoicus

Cladistically included but traditionally excluded taxa
- Alectoris; Ammoperdix; Margaroperdix; Pternistis; Tetraogallus

= Old World quail =

Several species of pheasant like birds

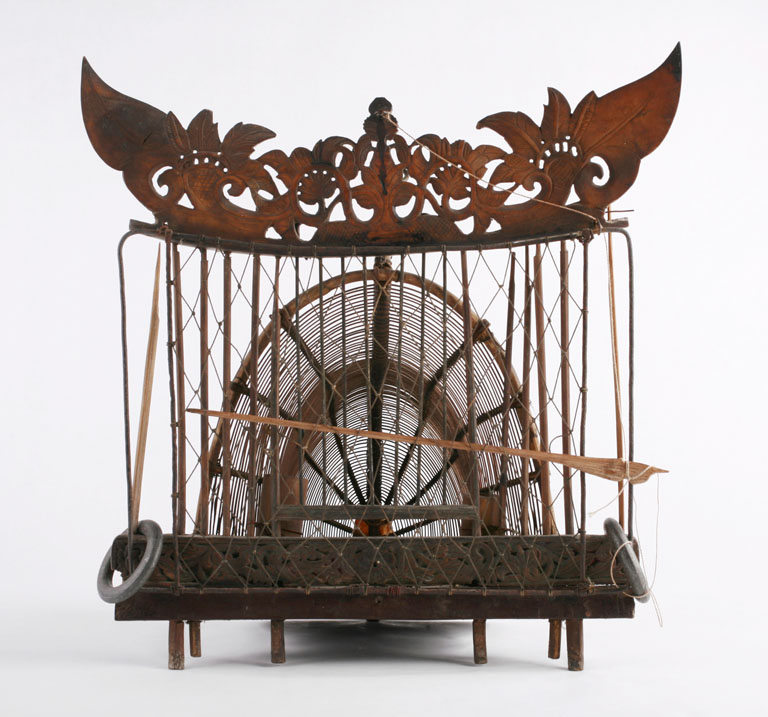
A quail trap from Malaysia, also known as the jebak puyuh: A female quail was placed in the woven container behind the netting. As the female called out, a male mate would approach and then the trap would fall on him. Quails are now rarely found in the wild in Malaysia, so such devices now serve as decoration.

"Old World quail" is a collective term for several unrelated genera of smaller galliform species under the tribe Coturnicini of the subfamily Phasianinae. Note that although species which are commonly referred to as "Old World quail" fall in the same tribe, they are paraphyletic with respect to the other genera of the tribe, such as Alectoris, Tetraogallus, Ammoperdix, Margaroperdix, and Pternistis. New World quail are also housed in the order Galliformes, but they are classified under a different family, Odontophoridae.

The buttonquails or hemipodes, despite their common name and similar resemblance to smaller members like the Asian blue quail (erroneously called "button quail"), are not related at all. They are presently placed in the family Turnicidae of the order Charadriiformes, in the same category as shorebirds.

The collective noun for a group of quail is flock, bevy or covey.

== Taxonomy ==
"Old World quail" may denote the following genera of the tribe Coturnicini:

- Genus Synoicus
  - Brown quail, Synoicus ypsilophorus
  - Snow Mountain quail, Synoicus monorthonyx
  - Blue quail, Synoicus adansonii
  - King quail, Synoicus chinensis
- Genus Coturnix
  - Rain quail, Coturnix coromandelica
  - Harlequin quail, Coturnix delegorguei
  - Common quail, Coturnix coturnix
  - †Canary Islands quail, Coturnix gomerae (fossil)
  - Japanese quail, Coturnix japonica
  - †New Zealand quail, Coturnix novaezelandiae (extinct)
  - Stubble quail, Coturnix pectoralis
- Genus Perdicula
  - Jungle bush quail, Perdicula asiatica
  - Rock bush quail, Perdicula argoondah
  - Painted bush quail, Perdicula erythrorhyncha
  - Manipur bush quail, Perdicula manipurensis
- Genus Ophrysia
  - Himalayan quail, Ophrysia superciliosa (critically endangered/extinct)

== Behaviour ==
Old World quail are small, plump terrestrial birds. They are seed eaters, but will also take insects and similar small prey. They nest on the ground and are capable of short, rapid bursts of flight. Some species, such as the Japanese and common quail, are migratory and fly for long distances. Some quail are farmed in large numbers. The common and Japanese (or coturnix) quail are both raised for table meat or to produce eggs. They are also readily hunted, often artificially stocked on game farms or to supplement wild populations.

Migrating common quail are known to eat some poisonous seeds with no apparent ill effects but store the poison in their body fat, poisoning people who subsequently eat these birds; this condition is known as "coturnism".
