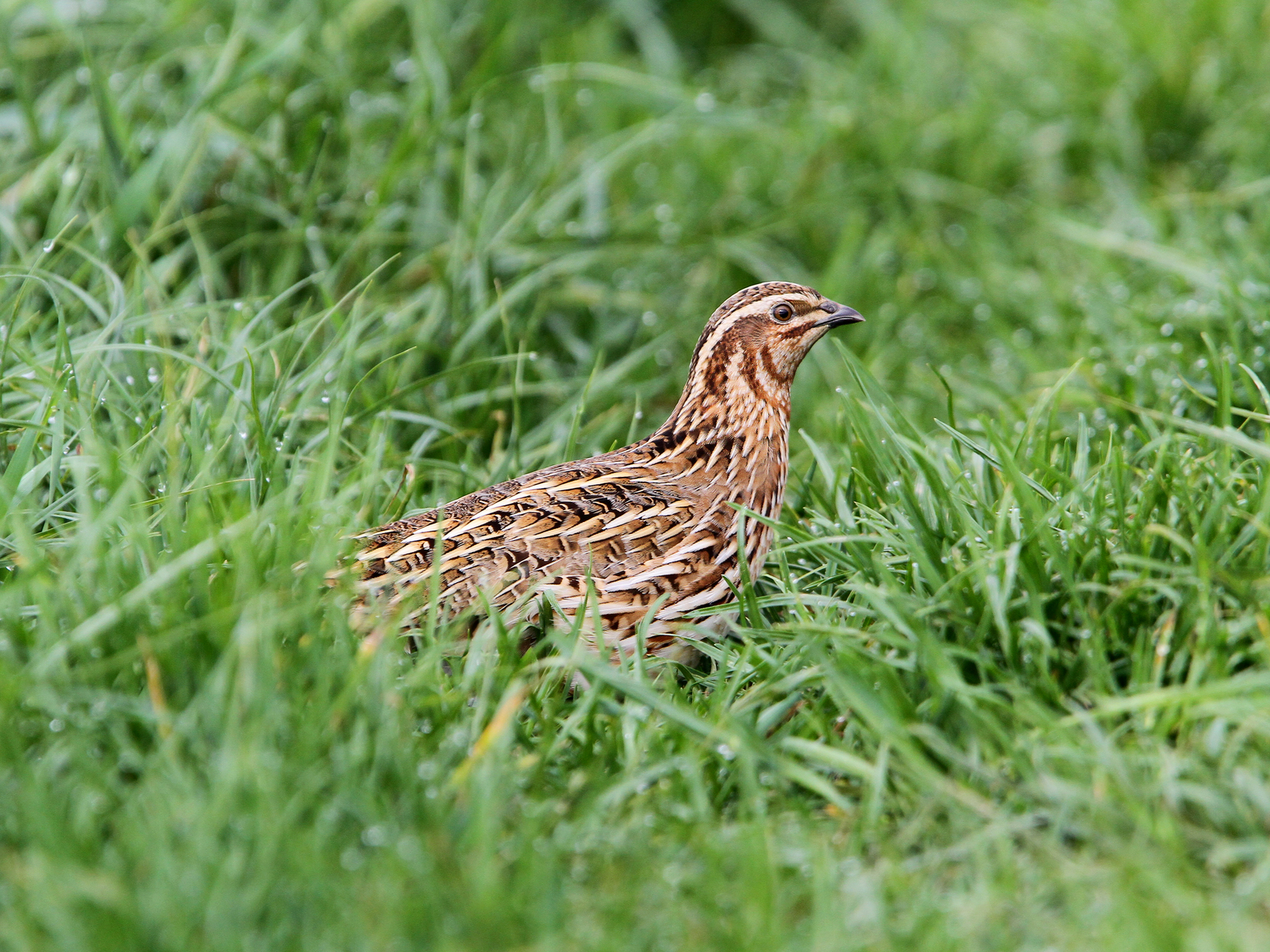
- Common quail (Coturnix coturnix)

Scientific classification
- Kingdom: Animalia
- Phylum: Chordata
- Class: Aves
- Order: Galliformes
- Family: Phasianidae
- Subfamily: Phasianinae
- Tribe: Coturnicini; Reichenbach, 1848

Genera
- Tetraogallus; Ammoperdix; Synoicus; Coturnix; Margaroperdix; Alectoris; Perdicula; Ophrysia (possibly extinct); Pternistis

Synonyms
- Tetraogallini

= Coturnicini =

Tribe of birds

Coturnicini is a tribe of birds in the subfamily Phasianinae. It contains the Old World quail, snowcocks, and African spurfowl, among others. Members of this tribe have a wide range throughout Africa, Eurasia, and Australasia. This tribe contains the only members of Pavoninae native to continental Europe (Coturnix and Alectoris), as well as the only members of Phasianidae as a whole native to Australasia (Coturnix and Synoicus). This grouping was supported by a 2021 phylogenetic analysis of Galliformes, and has been accepted by the International Ornithological Congress. The tribe name is accepted by the Howard and Moore Complete Checklist of the Birds of the World.

== Species ==
Image	Genus	Recent species
	Tetraogallus	Tibetan snowcock, Tetraogallus tibetanus; Altai snowcock, Tetraogallus altaicus; Caucasian snowcock, Tetraogallus caucasicus; Caspian snowcock, Tetraogallus caspius; Himalayan snowcock, Tetraogallus himalayensis
	Ammoperdix	See-see partridge, Ammoperdix griseogularis; Sand partridge, Ammoperdix heyi
	Synoicus	Brown quail, Synoicus ypsilophorus; Snow Mountain quail, Synoicus monorthonyx; King quail, Synoicus chinensis; Blue quail, Synoicus adansonii
	Margaroperdix	Madagascar partridge, Margaroperdix madagarensis
	Coturnix	Common quail, Coturnix coturnix; Japanese quail, Coturnix japonica; Harlequin quail, Coturnix delegorguei; Rain quail, Coturnix coromandelica; Stubble quail, Coturnix pectoralis; †New Zealand quail, Coturnix novaezelandiae (extinct)
	Alectoris	Barbary partridge, Alectoris barbara; Arabian partridge, Alectoris melanocephala; Red-legged partridge, Alectoris rufa; Chukar partridge, Alectoris chukar; Rock partridge, Alectoris graeca; Philby's partridge, Alectoris philbyi; Przevalski's partridge, Alectoris magna
	Perdicula	Jungle bush quail, Perdicula asiatica; Rock bush quail, Perdicula argoondah; Painted bush quail, Perdicula erythrorhyncha; Manipur bush quail, Perdicula manipurensis
	Ophrysia	Himalayan quail, Ophrysia superciliosa (possibly extinct)
	Pternistis	Hartlaub's spurfowl, Pternistis hartlaubi; Mount Cameroon spurfowl, Pternistis camerunensis; Handsome spurfowl, Pternistis nobilis; Chestnut-naped spurfowl, Pternistis castaneicollis; Erckel's spurfowl, Pternistis erckelii; Djibouti spurfowl, Pternistis ochropectus; Swierstra's spurfowl, Pternistis swierstrai; Ahanta spurfowl, Pternistis ahantensis; Grey-striped spurfowl, Pternistis griseostriatus; Jackson's spurfowl, Pternistis jacksoni; Red-billed spurfowl, Pternistis adspersus; Cape spurfowl, Pternistis capensis; Natal spurfowl, Pternistis natalensis; Hildebrandt's spurfowl, Pternistis hildebrandti; Double-spurred spurfowl, Pternistis bicalcaratus; Scaly spurfowl, Pternistis squamatus; Heuglin's spurfowl, Pternistis icterorhynchus; Clapperton's spurfowl, Pternistis clappertoni; Harwood's spurfowl, Pternistis harwoodi; Swainson's spurfowl, Pternistis swainsonii; Yellow-necked spurfowl, Pternistis leucoscepus; Grey-breasted spurfowl, Pternistis rufopictus; Red-necked spurfowl, Pternistis afer
