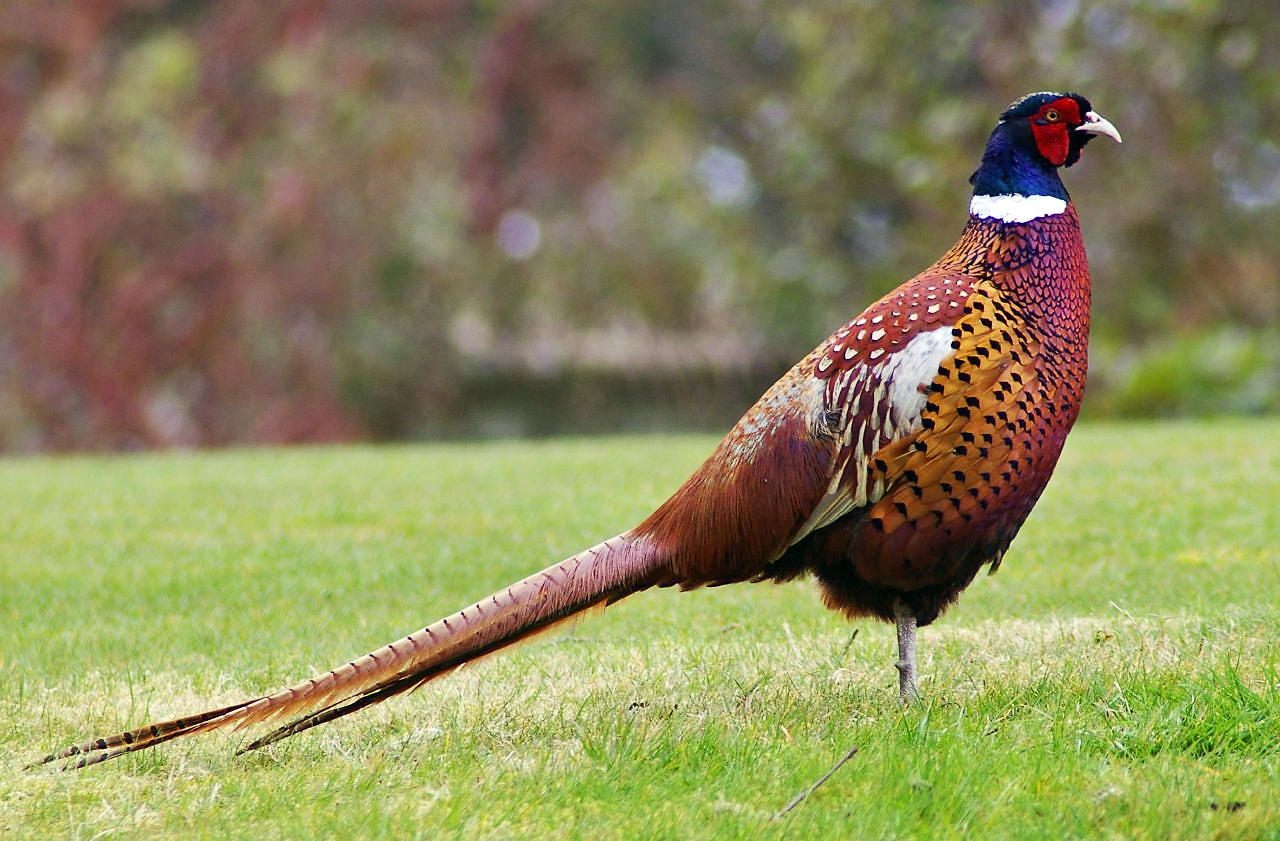
- Erectile clade: represented by a Mongolian ringneck-type common pheasant (Phasianus colchicus) cock
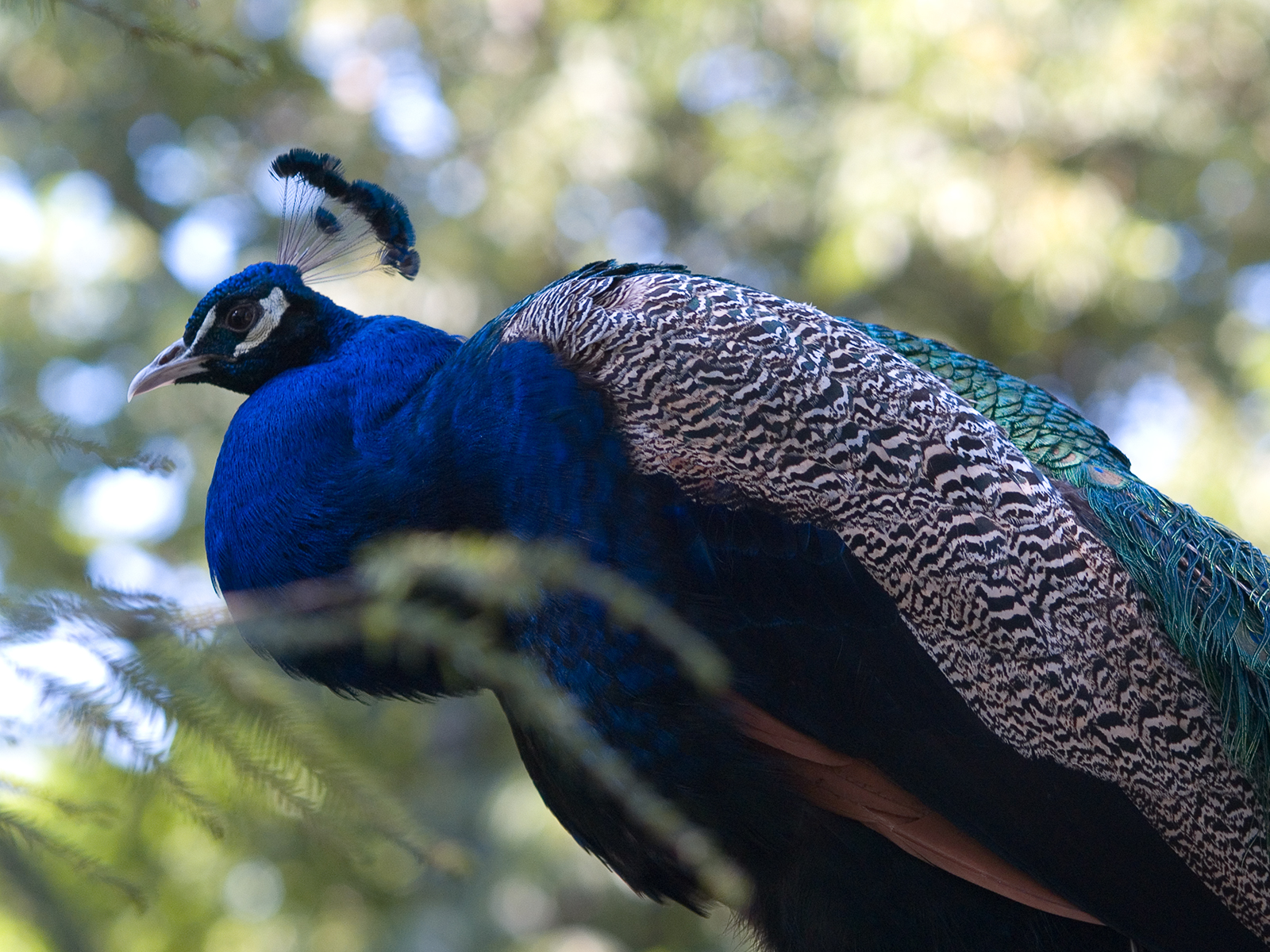
- Nonerectile clade: represented by an Indian peafowl (Pavo cristatus) peacock

Scientific classification
- Kingdom: Animalia
- Phylum: Chordata
- Class: Aves
- Order: Galliformes
- Family: Phasianidae
- Subfamily: Phasianinae; Horsfield, 1821

Type genus
- Phasianus Linnaeus, 1758

Genera
- See text

= Phasianinae =

Subfamily of birds

The Phasianinae (Horsfield, 1821) are a subfamily under the family Phasianidae of the order Galliformes. This subfamily notably includes the true pheasants, tragopans, tetraonids, Coturnicini, Pavonini, amongst other members.

Although this placement was once considered monophyletic and separate from the partridges, francolins and Old World quail (now-defunct Perdicinae) until the early 1990s, molecular phylogenies have shown that this subfamily is paraphyletic. For instance, certain genera like Lophophorus and Meleagris, as well as members of the genus Perdix, are cladistically more closely related to grouse and true pheasants, whereas other genera like Tetraogallus, Coturnix, and members in the genus Alectoris, share a much closer kinship to peafowl and junglefowl. There are two clades in this subfamily: the erectile clade and the non-erectile clade, referring to erectile tissue in the bare, non-feathered parts of the face. Both clades are believed to have diverged during the early Oligocene, about 30 million years ago.

The Phasianinae are characterized by strong sexual dimorphism, with males being highly ornate not limited to distinct coloration and patterning, as well as adornments such as combs, wattles, air sacs, tufts, crests, and long modified uppertail coverts (trains) and rectrices. Males are typically larger and heavier than females. Males play little to no part in rearing their offspring except a few species like the willow ptarmigan.

Their diet generally consists of seeds, grains, greens, and some invertebrates, with several being seasonally-specialized herbivores like grouse.

== Genera in taxonomic order ==
This list is ordered to show presumed relationships between species. Tribes and subfamily names are based on the 4th edition of the Howard and Moore Complete Checklist of the Birds of the World. Genera without a tribe are considered to belong to tribe incertae sedis.

=== "Erectile clade" ===
Image	Tribe	Genera
	incertae sedis	Lerwa (snow partridge)
	incertae sedis	Ithaginis (blood pheasant)
	Lophophorini	Lophophorus (monals); Tetraophasis (monal-partridges); Tragopan (tragopans)
	incertae sedis	Pucrasia (koklass pheasant)
	Tetraonini	Bonasa (ruffed grouse); Canachites (spruce grouse); Centrocercus (sage-grouse); Dendragapus (blue grouse); Falcipennis (Siberian grouse); Lagopus (ptarmigans); Lyrurus (black grouse); Meleagris (turkeys); Tetrao (capercaillies); Tetrastes (hazel grouse); Tympanuchus (prairie-chickens and sharp-tailed grouse)
	incertae sedis	Rhizothera (long-billed partridges)
	incertae sedis	Perdix (true partridges)
	Phasianini	Catreus (cheer pheasant); Chrysolophus (ruffed pheasants); Crossoptilon (eared pheasants); Lophura (gallopheasants); Phasianus (true pheasants); Syrmaticus (long-tailed pheasants)

=== "Non-erectile clade" ===
Image	Tribe	Genera
	Pavonini	Afropavo (African peafowl); Argusianus (great argus); Pavo (Asiatic peafowl); Rheinardia (crested arguses)
	incertae sedis	Polyplectron (peacock-pheasants)
	incertae sedis	Haematortyx (crimson-headed partridge)
	incertae sedis	Tropicoperdix
	incertae sedis	Galloperdix (Asian spurfowl)
	Gallini	Bambusicola (bamboo partridges); Campocolinus; Francolinus; Gallus (junglefowl, including the domestic chicken); Ortygornis; Peliperdix (Latham's francolin); Scleroptila
	Coturnicini	Alectoris (rock partridges); Ammoperdix (see-see and sand partridges); Coturnix (typical Old World quails); Margaroperdix (Madagascar partridge); Ophrysia (Himalayan quail); Perdicula (bush-quails); Pternistis (partridge-francolins; African spurfowls); Synoicus; Tetraogallus (snowcocks)
