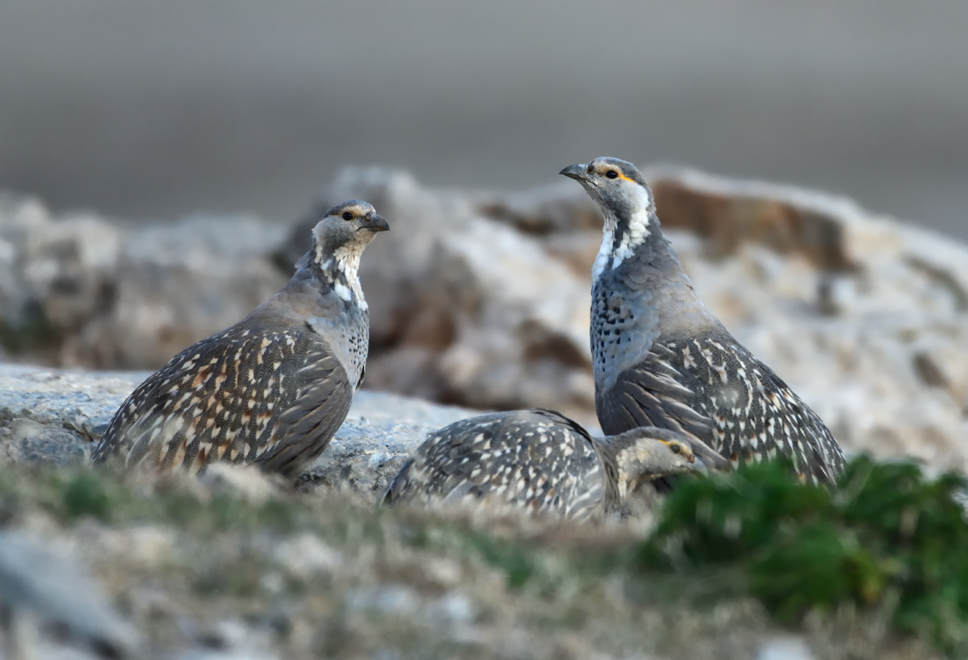

Conservation status
- Least Concern (IUCN 3.1)
- CITES Appendix I

Scientific classification
- Kingdom: Animalia
- Phylum: Chordata
- Class: Aves
- Order: Galliformes
- Family: Phasianidae
- Genus: Tetraogallus
- Species: T. caspius

Binomial name
- Tetraogallus caspius (Gmelin, 1784)

Synonyms
- Tetrao caspius Gmelin, 1784

= Caspian snowcock =

Species of bird

The Caspian snowcock (Tetraogallus caspius) is a species of bird, a snowcock, belonging to the family Phasianidae, which includes the pheasants, partridges and related species, in the order Galliformes. This species is found in the mountains of southwestern Asia.

== Taxonomy ==
The Caspian snowcock was first formally described as Tetrao caspius in 1784 by the German physician, botanist andexplorer Samuel Gottlieb Gmelin with its type locality given as the Province of Astarabad in northern Persia. The snowcock genus, Tetraogallus, is included in the tribe Coturnicini, in the "non-erectile" clade of the subfamily Phasianinae in the pheasant family Phasianidae.

The Caspian snowcock has three recognised subspecies:

- Tetraogallus caspius caspius (Gmelin, 1784) - Armenia, Azerbaijan, southwestern Turkmenistan and northwestern Iran;
- Tetraogallus caspius tauricus Dresser, 1876 - southern and eastern Turkey, southwestern Armenia
- Tetraogallus caspius semenowtianschanskii Zarudny, 1908 - Zagros Mountains, southeastern Iran

== Description ==
The Caspian snowcock is a large, bulky bird which has a length of 56 to 63 cm (22 to 25 in), a wingspan of 95 to 105 cm (37 to 41 in) and a weight of 1.8 to 2.9 kg (4.0 to 6.4 lb)> The head id relatively large and it has a long tail. It is similar to the closely related Caucasian snowcock (T. caucasius) but differs in being a little lighter in colour, with a largely grey bnape which lacks any rufous, a pale grey breast with fine spots at its centre, the mantle and sides of the breast are plain grey. The stripes on the flanks are finer than those on the Caucasian snowcock. The song is a whistling call, resembling that of a loon, there are also a variety of high pitched calls which resemble the calls of some birds of prey.

== Distribution and habitat ==
The Caspian snowcock has a discontinuous distribution from the Taurus Mountains of southern and eastern Turkiye, the southern Caucasus Mountains in Armenia, southern Georgia, Azerbaijan and western Iran and the Zagros Mountains of southwestern Iran. This species is found in the higher parts of the mountains between the treeline and the snowline, will move to lower elevations in severe snowstorms.

== Biology ==
The Caspian snowcock are typically found in subalpine and alpine meadows at elevations between 2,000 and 4,000 m (6,600 and 13,100 ft), infrequently as low as 1,800 m (5,900 ft). They prefer steep slopes with no snow cover, as well as gorges and cliffs where there are snow patches and some vegetation, made up of herbs and grasses. In summer they prefer south-facing slopes, moving to north-facing slopes in winter, avoiding areas covered in snow and preferring open areas with vegetation resembling steppe. Courtship starts in April, the hens lay netween 5 and 9 eggs in late April and May on steep slopes. The nests are located in the open under overhanging rocks, among stones or within tussocks of grass. They are herbivorous, showing a preference for legumes, and y=they will feed on bulbs, flowers, fruits and seeds. Caspian snowcocks are largelt sedentary and in some areas they remain at higher elevations all year enem in periods of extreme snowfall. However, in Turkiye, they have been observed making movements to lower elevations in severe weather.
