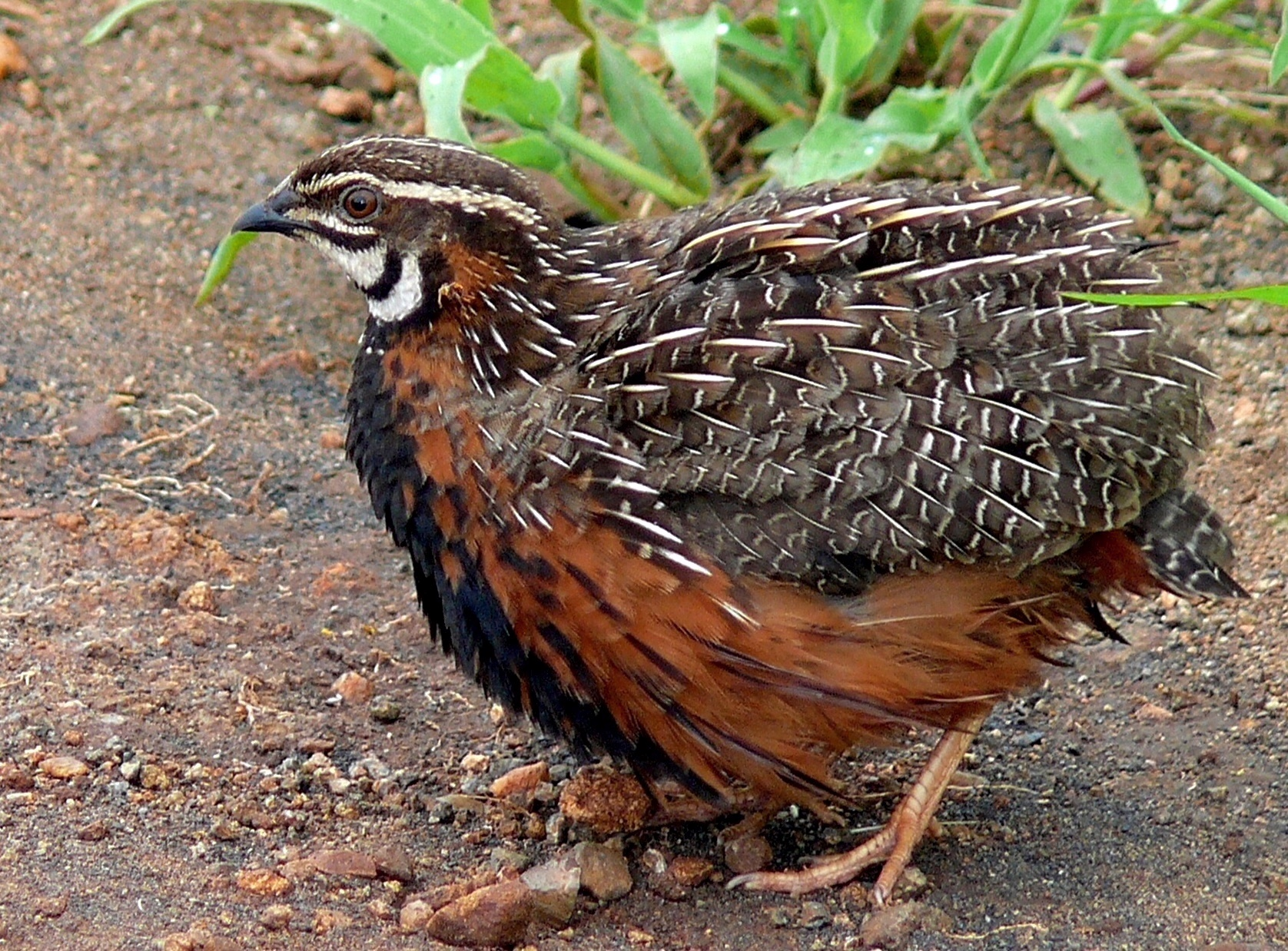
- Harlequin quail, C. delegorguei

Scientific classification
- Kingdom: Animalia
- Phylum: Chordata
- Class: Aves
- Order: Galliformes
- Family: Phasianidae
- Subfamily: Phasianinae
- Tribe: Coturnicini
- Genus: Coturnix; Garsault, 1764

Type species
- Tetrao coturnix Linnaeus, 1758

Species
- See text

= Coturnix =

Genus of birds

Coturnix is a genus of five extant species and five to eight known extinct species of Old World quail.

== Range ==
These species are distributed throughout Africa, Eurasia, Australia, and formerly New Zealand. An extinct radiation of flightless, insular species is known through fossil remains from Macaronesia, which were likely wiped out by human arrival.

== Habits ==
Quail of Coturnix live in pairs or small social groups and form larger groups during migration. Not all species migrate, but most are capable of extremely rapid, upward flight to escape from danger. Unlike related genera, Old World quail do not perch in trees. They devote much of their time to scratching and foraging for seeds and invertebrates on the ground. Typical habitats are dense vegetation such as grasslands, bushes alongside rivers and cereal fields. They are heavily predated upon by diurnal hawks.

== Taxonomy ==
The genus Coturnix was introduced in 1764 by the French naturalist François Alexandre Pierre de Garsault. The type species is the common quail (Coturnix coturnix). The genus name is the Latin for the common quail. The genus contains six species, of which one, the New Zealand quail (Coturnix novaezelandiae), is now extinct but was described from a living specimen. The brown quail (S. ypsilophora), king quail (S. chinensis) and blue quail (S. adansonii), were formerly classified in this genus, but were later reclassified into Synoicus.

The quails are related to the African spurfowl, jungle bush quail, snowcocks and rock partridges, which together with the species of Coturnix, Synoicus, and a few others make up a clade called Coturnicini, a tribe within the subfamily Phasianinae.

== Species ==
Extant and recently extinct species
Common and binomial names	Image	Description	Range
Rain quail (Coturnix coromandelica)			The Indian subcontinent, especially the Indus valley of central Bangladesh, India, Nepal and Pakistan; winter range extends to Sri Lanka, Myanmar, Thailand, Cambodia and Vietnam
Harlequin quail (Coturnix delegorguei)			Africa and the Arabian Peninsula
Common quail (Coturnix coturnix)			Breeding range includes most of Europe and western Asia; winter in the Indian subcontinent and Africa. Some subspecies breed in sub-Saharan Africa
Japanese quail (Coturnix japonica)			Typically bred in East Asia and winter in Vietnam, Cambodia, Laos, and southern China, but have been reported breeding in Turkey and wintering across southern Africa
†New Zealand quail (Coturnix novaezelandiae)		(extinct)	New Zealand
Stubble quail (Coturnix pectoralis)			Australia, especially coastal New South Wales, Victoria and South Australia. Extirpated from Tasmania

Late Quaternary fossil species
Common and binomial names	Image	Description	Range
†Canary Islands quail (Coturnix gomerae)			La Gomera, Canary Islands
†Porto Santo quail (Coturnix alabrevis)			Porto Santo Island, Madeira
†Cape Verde quail (Coturnix centensis)			Cape Verde
†Madeiran quail (Coturnix lignorum)			Madeira Island, Madeira

Fragmentary remains representing three other Coturnix species were also recovered from Macaronesia: Coturnix sp. A from Bugio Island in Madeira, Coturnix sp. B from Santa Maria in the Azores (likely representing another extinct island endemic species) and Coturnix sp. C from Graciosa in the Azores. Due to their fragmentary nature, it is uncertain whether these represented their own species or were synonymous with one of the already-described extinct Coturnix species or the extant common quail (Coturnix coturnix), which also has fossil remains known from Macaronesia and is still present there.

A fossil species from the Late Oligocene - Late Miocene of SW and Central Europe was described as Coturnix gallica. Another, C. donnezani, was widespread in Early Pliocene to Early Pleistocene Europe.
