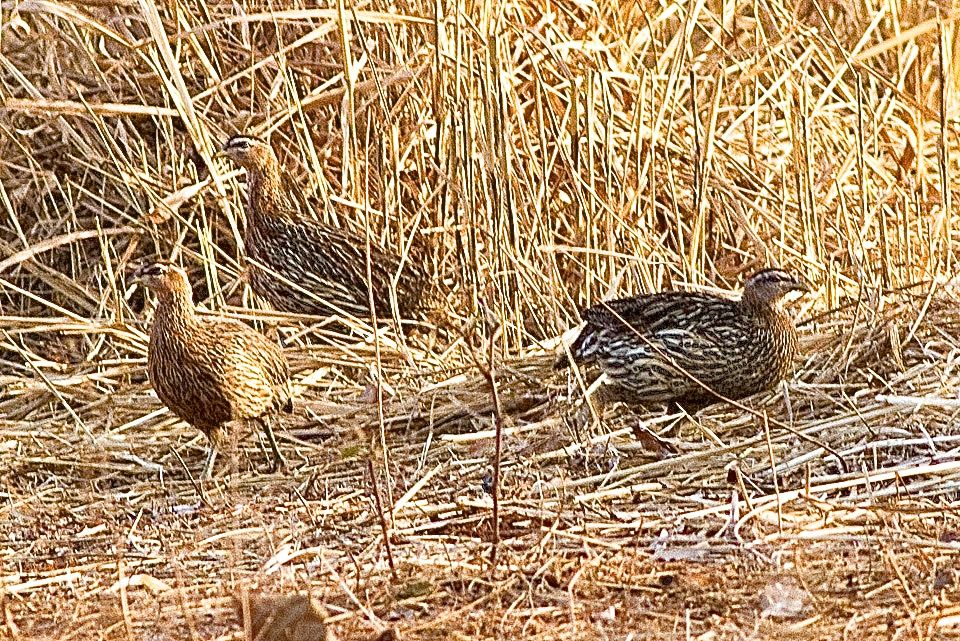
- A covey in central Cameroon

Conservation status
- Least Concern (IUCN 3.1)

Scientific classification
- Kingdom: Animalia
- Phylum: Chordata
- Class: Aves
- Order: Galliformes
- Family: Phasianidae
- Genus: Pternistis
- Species: P. bicalcaratus

Binomial name
- Pternistis bicalcaratus (Linnaeus, 1766)
- geographic distribution

Synonyms
- Tetrao bicalcaratus Linnaeus, 1766; Francolinus bicalcaratus (Linnaeus, 1766)

= Double-spurred spurfowl =

Species of bird

The double-spurred spurfowl (Pternistis bicalcaratus) is a gamebird in the pheasant family Phasianidae of the order Galliformes, gallinaceous birds. Like most spurfowls, it is restricted to Africa. It is a resident breeder in tropical West Africa, but there is a small and declining isolated population in Morocco.

== Taxonomy ==
In 1760, the French zoologist Mathurin Jacques Brisson included a description of the double-spurred spurfowl in his Ornithologie, based on a specimen that had been collected in Senegal. He used the French name "La Perdrix du Sénégal" and the Latin "Perdix Senegalensis." Although Brisson coined Latin names, these do not conform to the binomial system and are not recognised by the International Commission on Zoological Nomenclature. When in 1766, the Swedish naturalist Carl Linnaeus updated his Systema Naturae for the twelfth edition, he added 240 species that had been previously described by Brisson. One of these was the double-spurred spurfowl. Linnaeus included a brief description, coined the binomial name Tetrao bicalcaratus and cited Brisson's work. The specific epithet bicalcaratus combines the Latin bi meaning "two" and calcaris meaning "spur". The species is now placed in the genus Pternistis that was introduced by the German naturalist Johann Georg Wagler in 1832. A phylogenetic study published in 2019 found that the double-spurred spurfowl is sister to Heuglin's spurfowl.

Three subspecies are now recognised:

- P. b. adamauae (Neumann, 1915) — central Nigeria to Cameroon and southwest Chad
- P. b. ayesha (Hartert, 1917) — west Morocco
- P. b. bicalcaratus (Linnaeus, 1766) — Senegambia and south Mauritania to west Nigeria

== Description ==
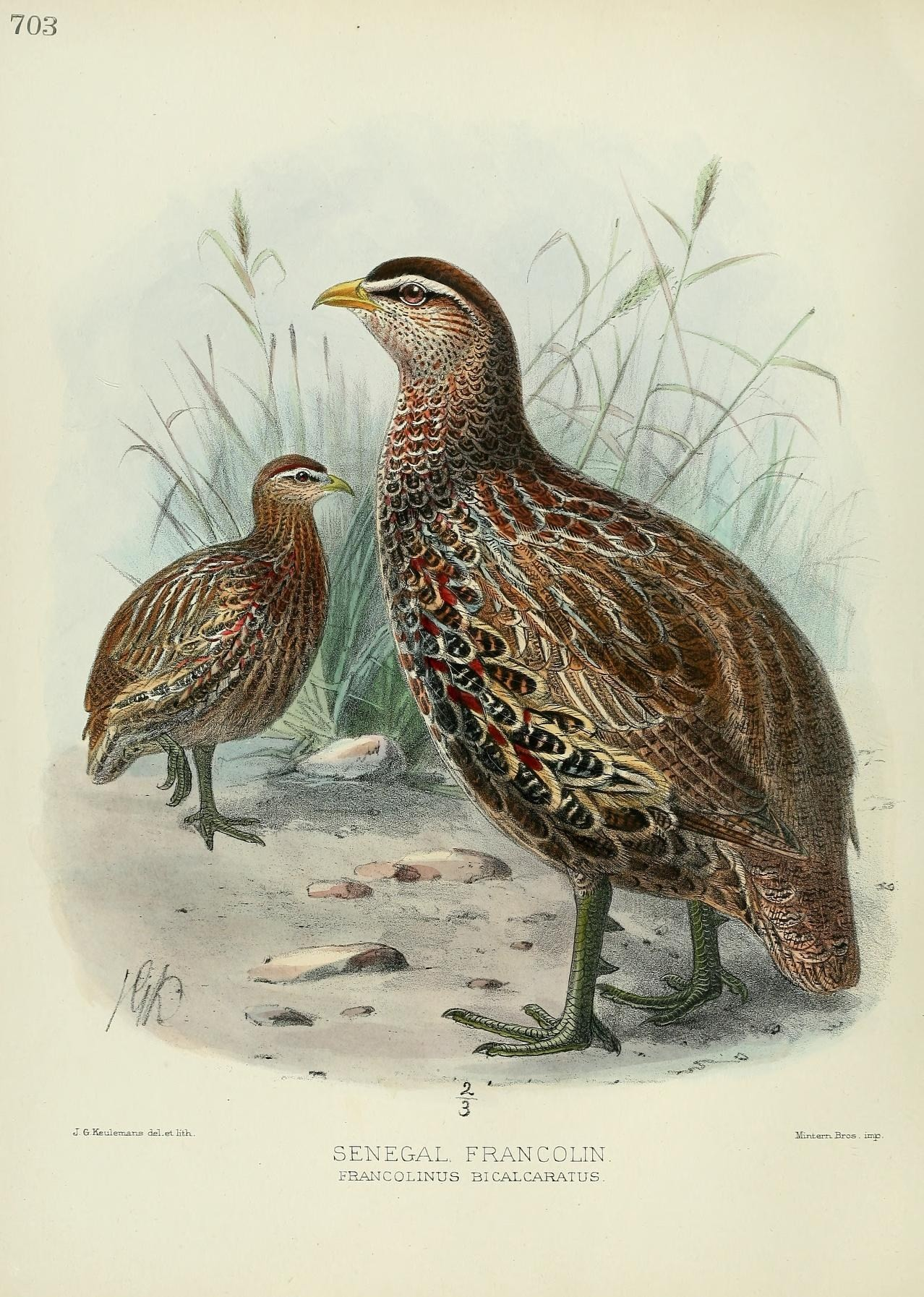
Illustration by J. G. Keulemans

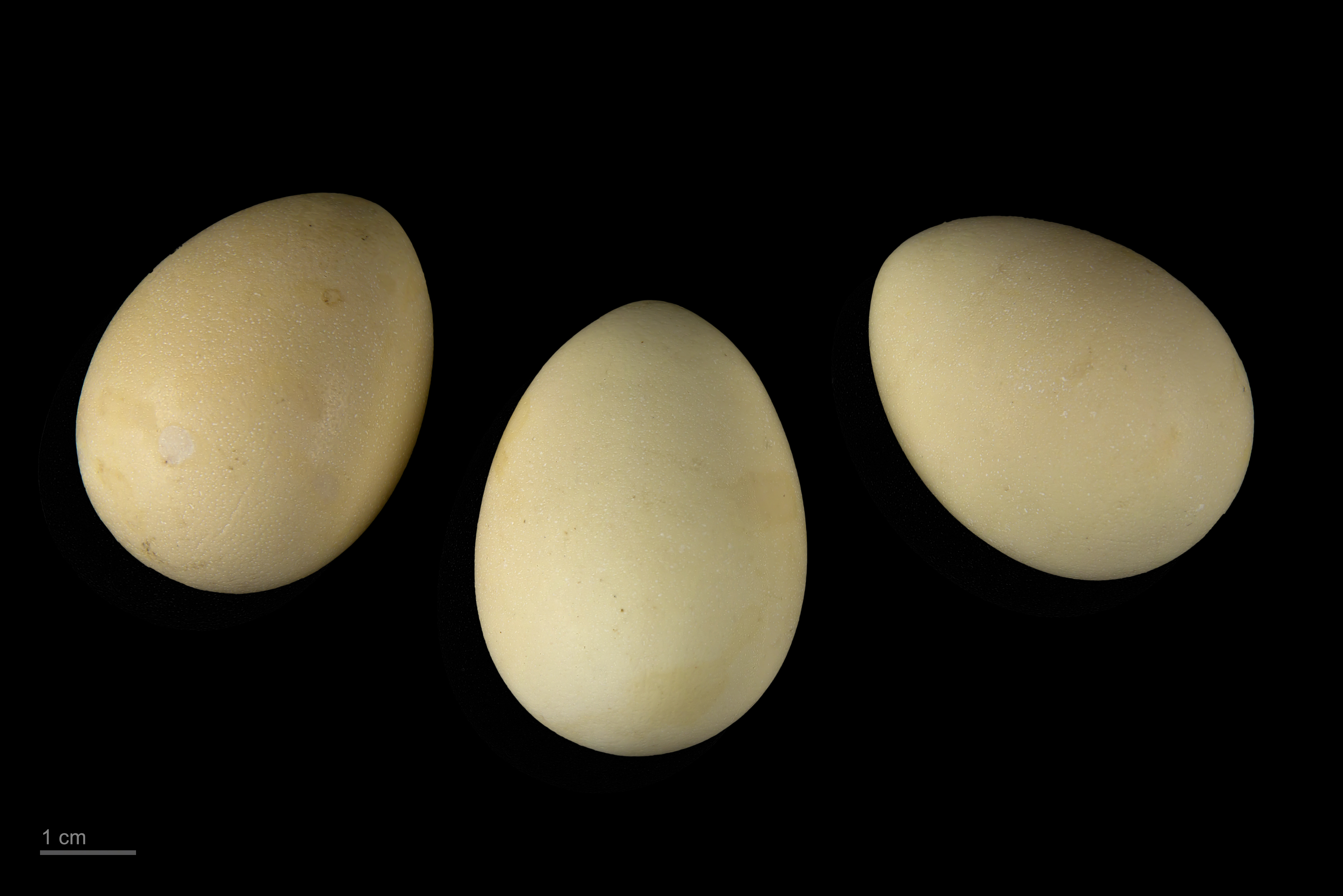
Pternistis bicalcaratus ayesha - MHNT

The double-spurred spurfowl is 30–34 cm (12–13 in) in length. The male is mainly brown, sparingly streaked and spotted darker and cream above, chest and flank feathers are dark brown edged and centrally spotted cream. The face is pale cream finely flecked with dark brown, and the head features a chestnut crown and white supercilium. It has a chestnut neck collar, white cheek patches and brown wings. The male usually has two spurs on each leg, the upper one being blunt. The legs are dull green. The female is similar in appearance, but usually lacks spurs and is slightly smaller and less robustly built. Males weigh around 507 g (17.9 oz) and females around 381 g (13.4 oz). Young birds are almost indistinguishable from adult females after the post juvenile moult at several weeks old, males take several months to develop any spurs. Breeding is unlikely until the birds are in their second year.

== Distribution and habitat ==
This bird is found in open habitats with trees. It nests in a lined ground scrape laying 5 to 7 eggs. The double-spurred spurfowl takes a wide variety of plant and insect food. This is a very unobtrusive species, best seen in spring when the male sings a mechanical krak-krak-krak from a mound. It has a pheasant's explosive flight, but prefers to creep away unseen.
