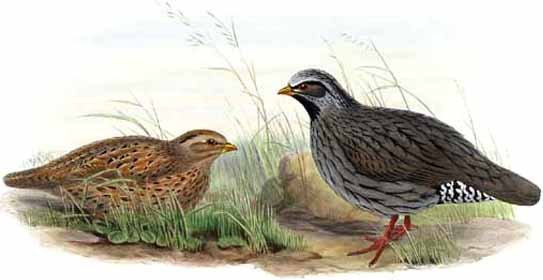
- Painting by John Gould based on specimens in the Derby museum (now World Museum) (male and female on 1 April 1836 in Nainital). These are the type specimens (D259 and D259a).

Conservation status
- Critically Endangered (IUCN 3.1)

Scientific classification
- Kingdom: Animalia
- Phylum: Chordata
- Class: Aves
- Order: Galliformes
- Family: Phasianidae
- Tribe: Coturnicini
- Genus: Ophrysia; Bonaparte, 1856
- Species: O. superciliosa

Binomial name
- Ophrysia superciliosa (Gray, JE, 1846)
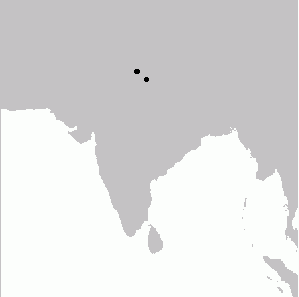

Synonyms
- Rollulus superciliosus Malacortyx superciliaris Malacoturnix superciliaris

= Himalayan quail =

Species of bird

The Himalayan quail (Ophrysia superciliosa) or mountain quail, is a medium-sized quail belonging to the pheasant family. It was last reported in 1876 and is feared extinct. This species was known from only two locations (and 12 specimens) in the western Himalayas in Uttarakhand, north-west India. The last verifiable record was in 1876 near the hill station of Mussoorie.

== Description ==
Turnaround video of a specimen, Naturalis Biodiversity Center

The red bill and legs of this small dark quail and white spots before and after the eye make it distinctive. The male is dark grey with bleak streaks and a white forehead and supercilium. The female is brownish with dark streaks and greyish brow. Like the male it has a white spot in front of the eye and a larger one behind the eye. It is believed to fly only when flushed at close quarters and was found in coveys of five or six. The habitat was steep hillsides covered by long grass. The genus name is derived from ophrys, which refers to the brow.

This quail has long tail coverts and the 10 feathered tail is longer, nearly as long as the wing, than in most quails. The feathers of the forehead are bristly and stiff.

The species was described in 1846 by J.E. Gray from living specimens in the collection of the Earl of Derby at Knowsley Hall, and he gave the locality as "India" with a query. These are the two syntype specimens of Rollulus superciliosa J.E.Gray (Knowsley Menagerie, 1, 1846, p.8, pl.16) and are held in the collections of National Museums Liverpool at World Museum, with accession numbers D259 (male) and D259a (female). The specimens were collected in India (=Mussoorie), were purchased from Tucker on 1 April 1836, and came to the Liverpool national collection via the 13th Earl of Derby's collection which was bequeathed to the city of Liverpool.

It was not until 1865 that it was first found in the wild by Kenneth Mackinnon who shot a pair in November, in a hollow between Budraj and Benog, behind Mussoorie, at about 6,000 feet (1,800 m) elevation. Two years later, again in November, five specimens were obtained by a group near Jerepani (Jharipani). In December 1876, Major G. Carwithen obtained a specimen from the eastern slopes of Sher-ka-danda, close to Nainital, at an elevation of 7,000 feet (2,100 m). Frank Finn suggested that it was a migratory bird, arriving in winter, although expressing doubts on account of the short wings. The birds near Mussoorie as observed by Hutton and others occurred in small coveys of six to ten, that kept to high grass and scrub, fed on seeds of grass, were difficult to flush, and had a shrill whistling note when flushed. They appeared to arrive about November, but in one case stayed as late as June, after which they disappeared.

== Specimens and records ==
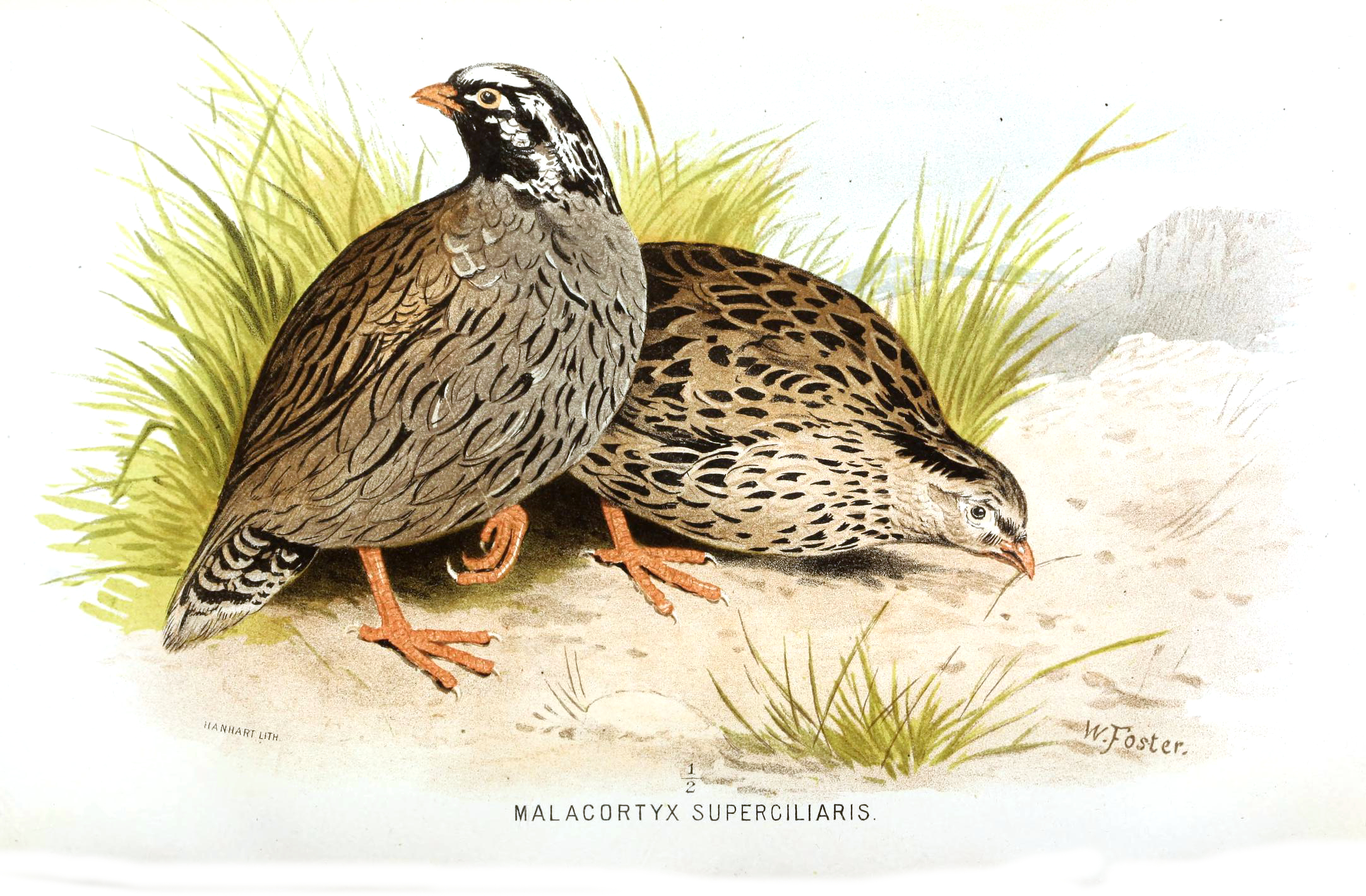
A pair of Himalayan quails from Hume and Marshall's Game-birds of India, Burmah and Ceylon. Hume noted that the depiction was incorrect and that the plumage of the male (left) should have been almost black.

Specimens are known from:

- Uttar Pradesh (now Uttarakhand), Mussoorie (1836, 2 specimens, type locality)
- 5 km to the north-west of Mussoorie, between Badraj and Benog, 1,850 m. (November 1865, 1 specimen, 1 lost)
- Jharipani, 5 km to the south of Mussorie, c.1,650 m (November - June 1867/68 or 1869/70, 4 specimens total)
- Eastern slopes of Sher-ka-danda near Nainital, 2,100 m (December 1876, 1 specimen)

By 1904 it was already considered a rarity.

Sidney Dillon Ripley (1952) records a local bird name sano kalo titra ("small black/dusky partridge") from the Dailekh district of Nepal. The only bird from the general area that seems to fit such a description would be a male Himalayan quail.

== Ecology ==
All records of the Himalayan quail are in the altitude range of 1,650 to 2,400 m. They were seen in patches of tall grass ("high jungle grass", "tall seed-grass", see Terai) and brushwood on steep hillsides, particularly on the crests of south- or east-facing slopes. It probably bred around September. The June specimen is a yearling male in moult.

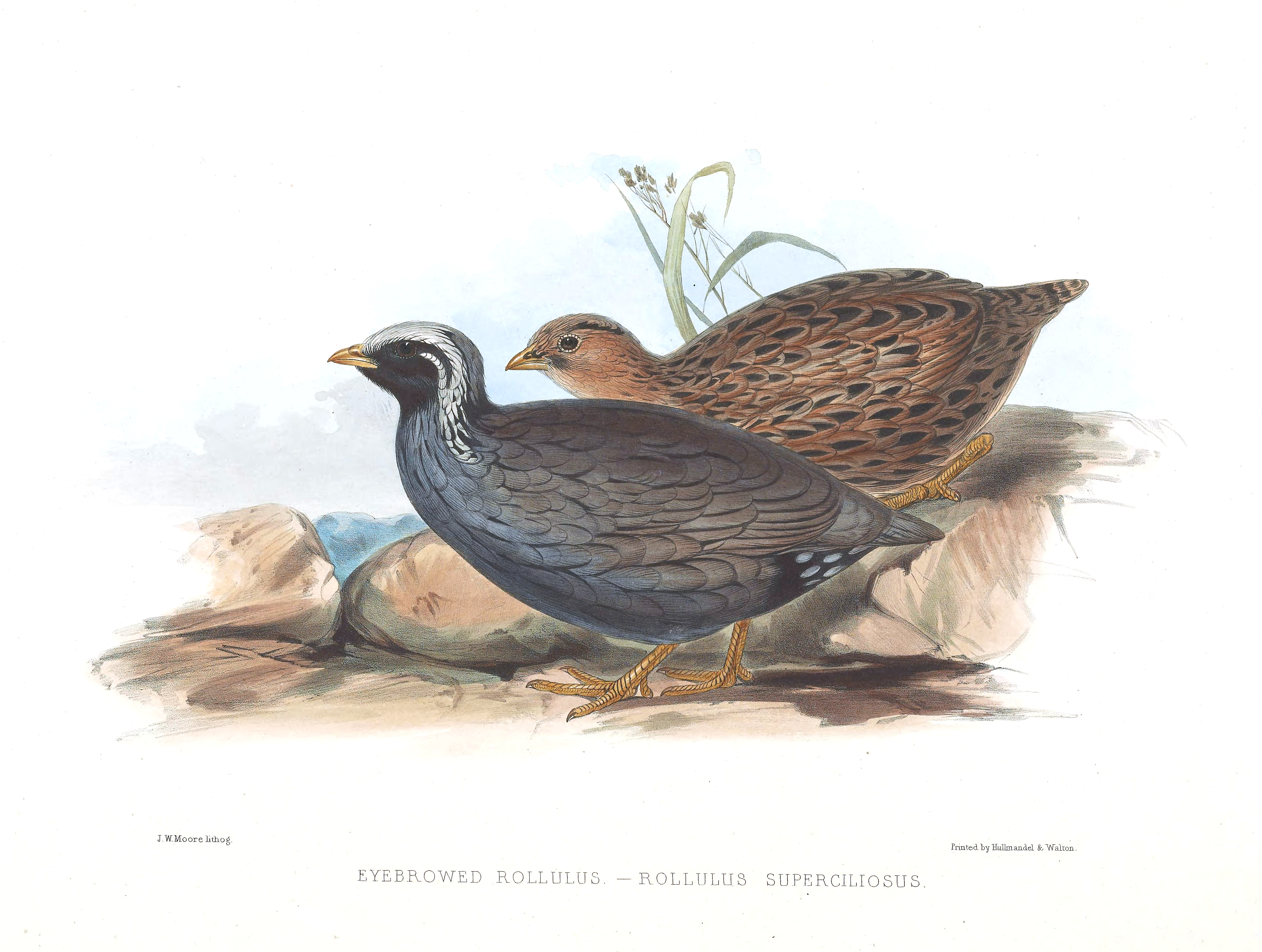
"Eyebrowed Rollulus" - A drawing from life by Edward Lear in J E Gray's Gleanings from the Menagerie and Aviary at Knowsley Hall (1846). These are the type specimens D259 and D259a in the collections at World Museum

A. O. Hume (Stray Feathers 9 [1880 or 1881]: 467-471) suggested that it was similar in habit to the Manipur bush quails Perdicula manipurensis in that it was seen very rarely, except at dawn or dusk, keeping to tall grassland, relying on its legs rather than its wings for escape and only flying when closely approached. The fluffy, soft plumage suggests it was adapted for low temperatures; it has been suggested that the birds migrated north and uphill in the summer months to the higher mountains, but the shape and size of its wings do not suggest a bird capable of flying long distances. However, the sites where it was recorded are almost 200 km apart and separated by the much lower elevation of the Ganges valley near Rishikesh. If the species was not an ice age relict that originally evolved in lower-lying areas during a globally colder climate and was only encountered by Europeans in the last vestiges of its range and at the time of its extinction, the distance between the records argues for the species being a short-distance seasonal migrant with a fairly contiguous breeding distribution but disjunct winter quarters.

== Taxonomy ==
"Gray (1846), describing Mountain Quails for the first time scientifically, places them together with the Crested Wood Partridges into the genus Rollulus. Gould (1883) believes in a close alliance to the See-See-Partridges, Ammoperdix. Ogilvie-Grant (1896) calls the Mountain Quail a pygmy pheasant and assumes a close relationship to the Blood Pheasants, Ithaginis. Ripley (1952) puts the Mountain Quails close to the Blood-Pheasants Ithaginis and Spurfowl, Galloperdix. Boetticher (1958) believes Mountain Quails to be related to the spurfowl, Galloperdix. Johnsgard (1988) thinks that Mountain Quails are closely related to Bush Quails, Perdicula (Johnsgard includes the genus Cryptoplectron into Perdicula). Ali (1977) also believes that Mountain Quails are closely related to Bush Quails, Perdicula, and Blood Pheasants, Ithaginis, due to a short stout bill and stiff bristle-like feathers on the forehead, features common in all three genera Ithaginis, Perdicula and Ophrysia.

As indicated by climate data from Mussoorie and Nainital, the records seem to suggest the species was present in these localities during the coldest (late January) and up to the hottest (late May to early July) time of the year. However, it was notably absent during the wet season (late June to mid-September). Since no very young birds were ever found, breeding may have taken place during the wet months perhaps in central Uttarakhand's Garhwal Himalaya, due northeast of the places where it was recorded and comparatively sparsely inhabited even today." (I. Rieger, D. Walzthoeny, 1993)

== Status ==
The Himalayan quail has not been reliably recorded in the wild after 1876. The locations where they were historically found have been greatly altered by human activity and the current habitats in these locations may not represent their normal habitat requirements. A 2015 study examined the rate of extinction and suggested that the species might still be extant and using the habitat preference of monal suggest that there might be some locations around Mussoorie where intensive surveys could be attempted.
