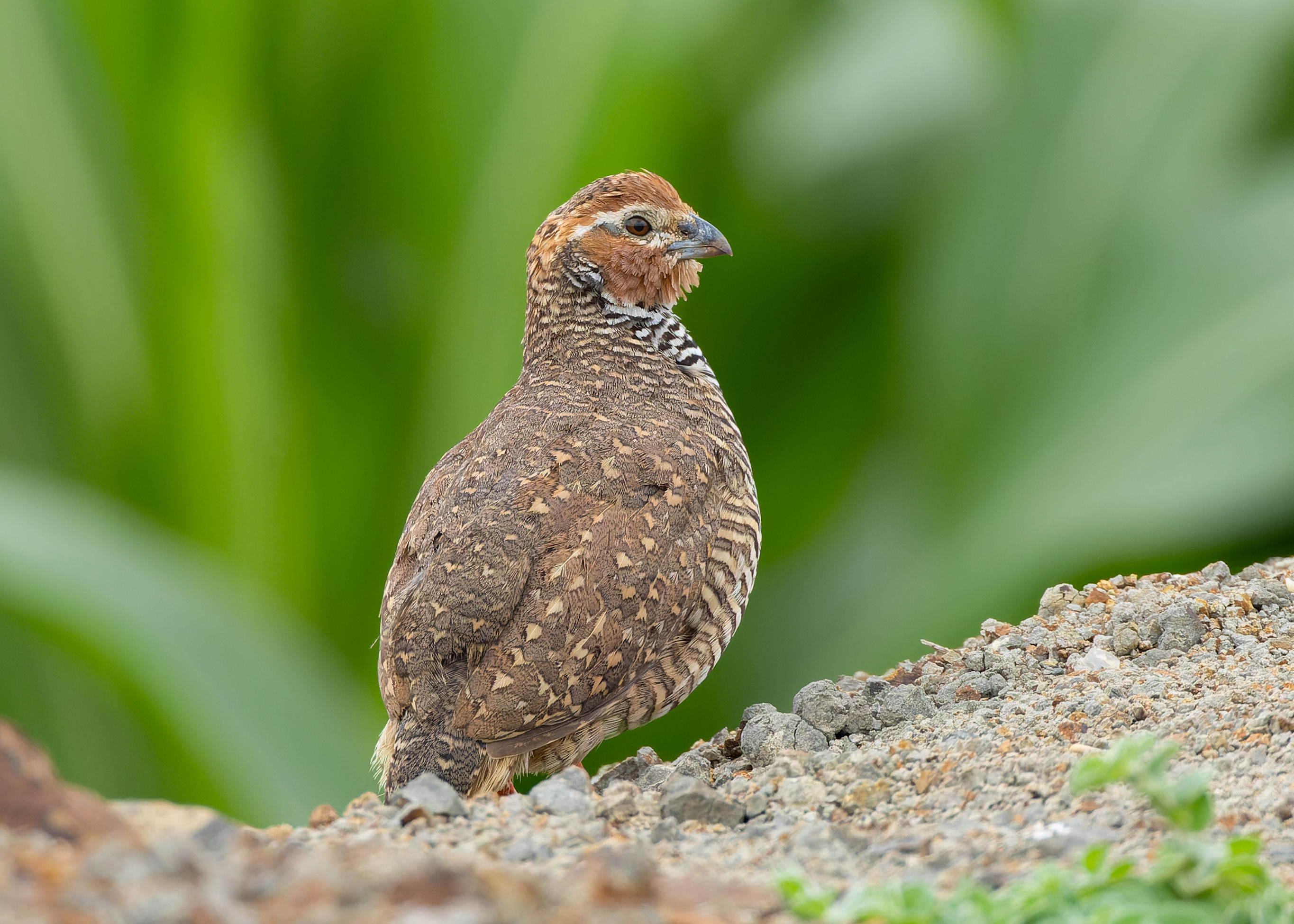
- Perdicula argoondah male in Bhigwan, Maharashtra, India.
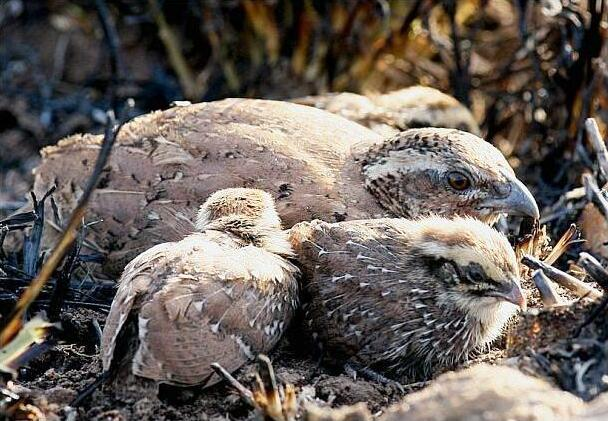
- Family

Conservation status
- Least Concern (IUCN 3.1)

Scientific classification
- Kingdom: Animalia
- Phylum: Chordata
- Class: Aves
- Order: Galliformes
- Family: Phasianidae
- Genus: Perdicula
- Species: P. argoondah

Binomial name
- Perdicula argoondah (Sykes, 1832)

= Rock bush quail =

Species of bird

The rock bush quail (Perdicula argoondah) (Note: Note: the name "argoondah" follows "goondri", the Assamese name for the Manipur bush quail (Perdicula manipurensis). Pittie, Aasheesh (2004). "A dictionary of scientific bird names originating from the Indian region". Buceros. 9 (2): 1–30.) is a species of quail found in parts of peninsular India. It is a common species with a wide range and the IUCN has rated it as being of "least concern".

== Taxonomy and systematics ==
There are three recognised subspecies:

- P. a. argoondah found from Madhya Pradesh southwards to Tamil Nadu
- P. a. meinertzhageni found in northwestern India
- P. a. salimalii found in South India in parts of Karnataka.

== Description ==
The rock bush quail is very similar to and overlaps in range with the jungle bush quail (Perdicula asiatica). These birds are found in small coveys and are often detected only when they suddenly burst out into flight en masse from under vegetation. It is 6.7–7.25 in (17.0–18.4 cm) in length and weighs 2.25–3 oz (64–85 g). It is some shade of brown barred and mottled with darker colour. A diagnostic feature is that the outermost primary feather is longer than the innermost, and the inner web of the primaries is barred or speckled with buff. The voice is a trill followed by a series of piping notes which start quiet and grow louder.

== Distribution and habitat ==
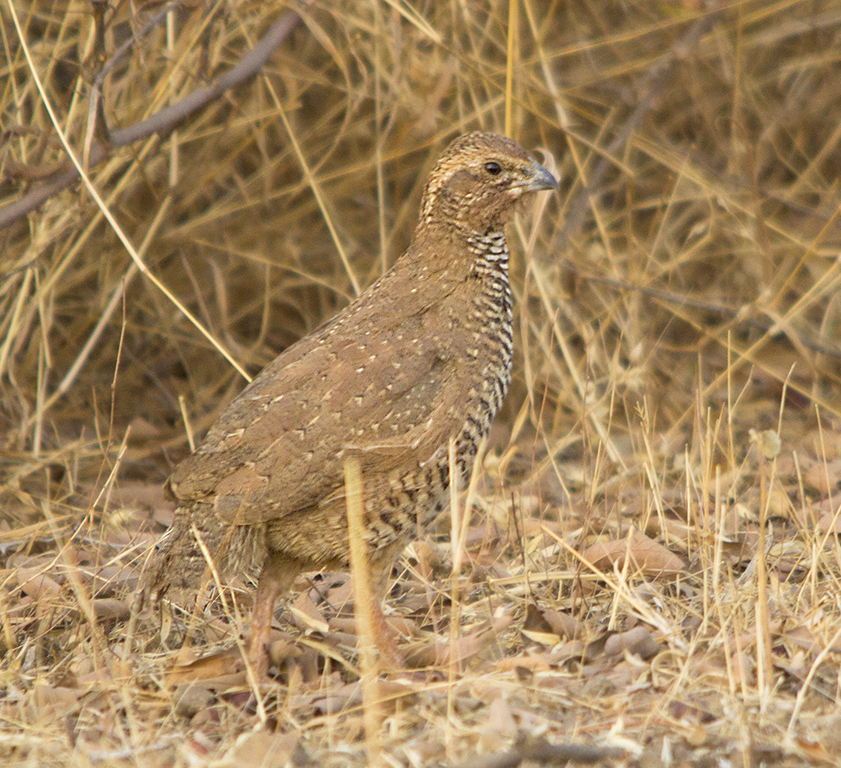
Male at Rajkot

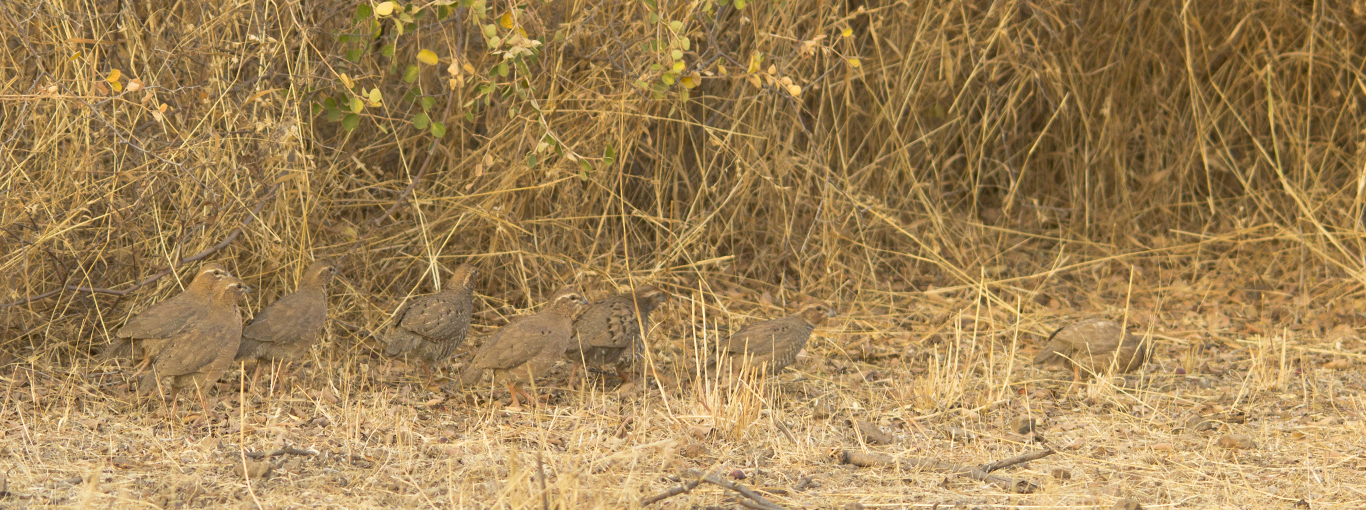
Flock at Rajkot

The rock bush quail is native to the western half of India and is believed to be a non-migratory species. It occurs in arid areas with scrubby grassland and thorny bushes and is seldom found above about 600 metres (2,000 ft).

== Status ==
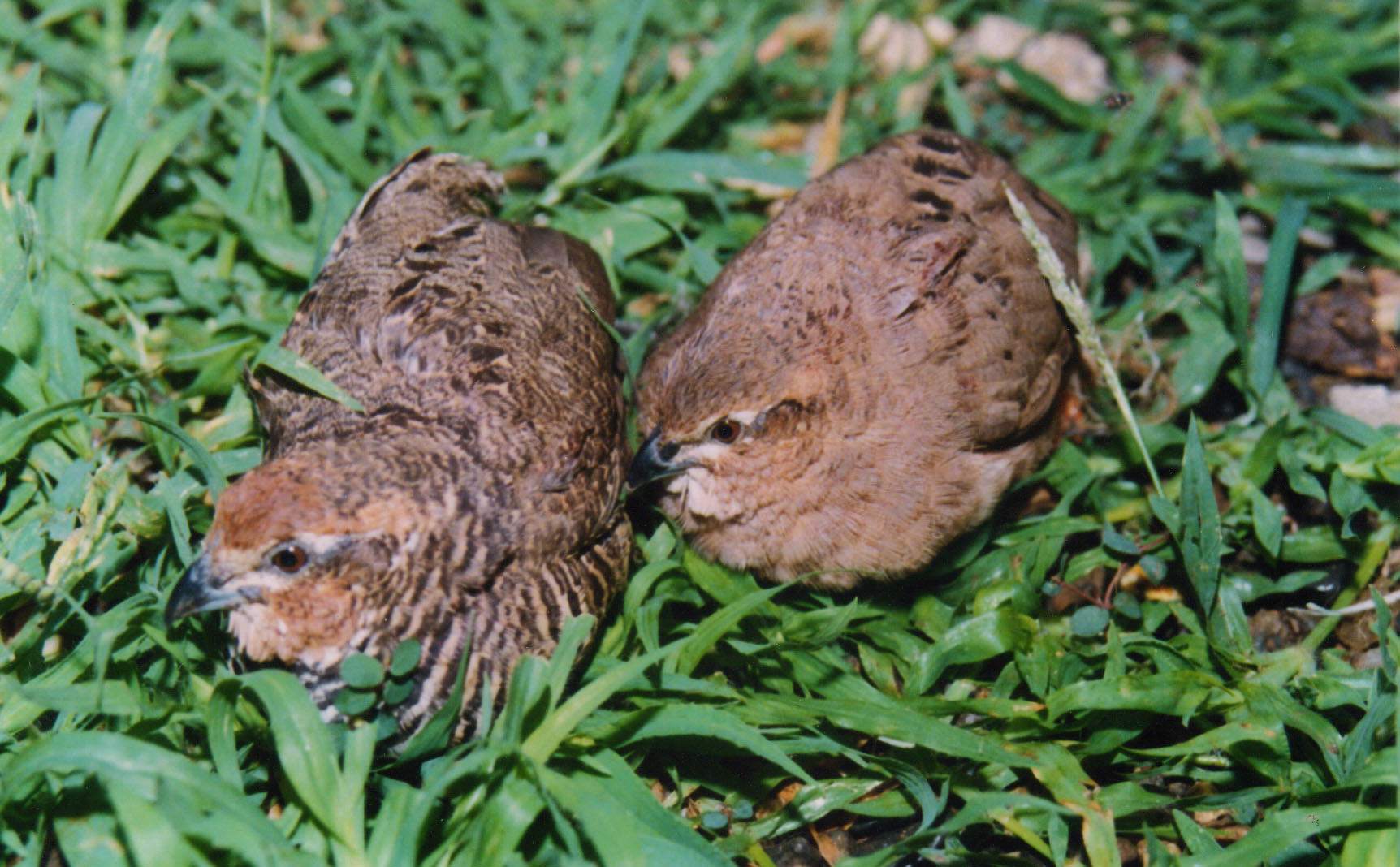
Rock bush quail

The rock bush quail has a very wide range and is common in many parts of that range. The International Union for Conservation of Nature has rated its conservation status as being of "least concern". Although the population has not been quantified, it is probably declining slowly, as the bird is subject to hunting pressure and destruction of its habitat. The rate of decline in population is insufficient to warrant listing the species in a more threatened category.
