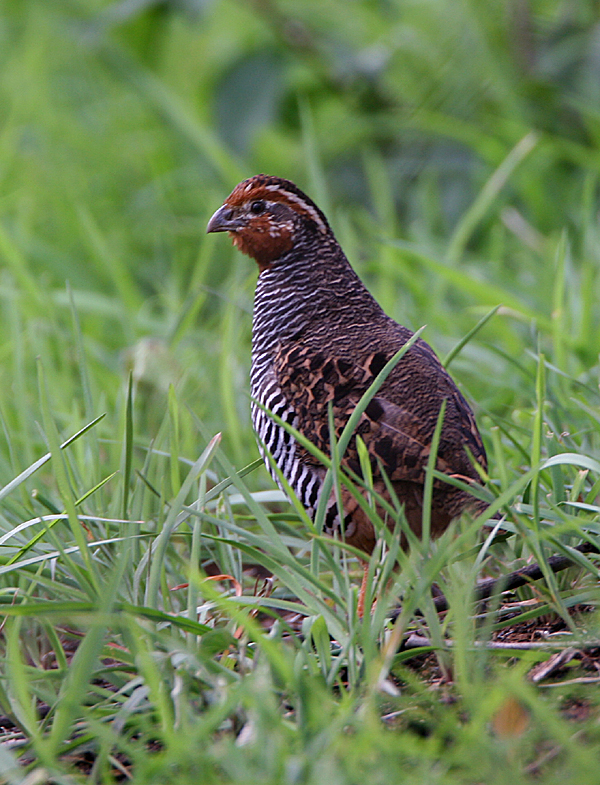
- Perdicula asiatica

Scientific classification
- Kingdom: Animalia
- Phylum: Chordata
- Class: Aves
- Order: Galliformes
- Family: Phasianidae
- Tribe: Coturnicini
- Genus: Perdicula; Hodgson, 1837

Type species
- Perdicula rubicola Hodgson, 1837 = Perdix asiatica Latham, 1790

Species
- See text

= Perdicula =

Genus of birds

Perdicula is a small genus of quail in the family Phasianidae, containing four species that are collectively known as the bush quails.

== Taxonomy ==
The generic name Perdicula is a Modern Latin diminutive of the genus Perdix, and means small partridge. The two genera are not closely related, with Perdix belonging to the tribe Phasianini in subfamily Phasianinae, while Perdicula belongs to the tribe Coturnicini in the subfamily Pavoninae.

The genus contains the following four species:

Image	Scientific name	Common name
	Perdicula asiatica	Jungle bush quail
	Perdicula argoondah	Rock bush quail
	Perdicula erythrorhyncha	Painted bush quail
	Perdicula manipurensis	Manipur bush quail
