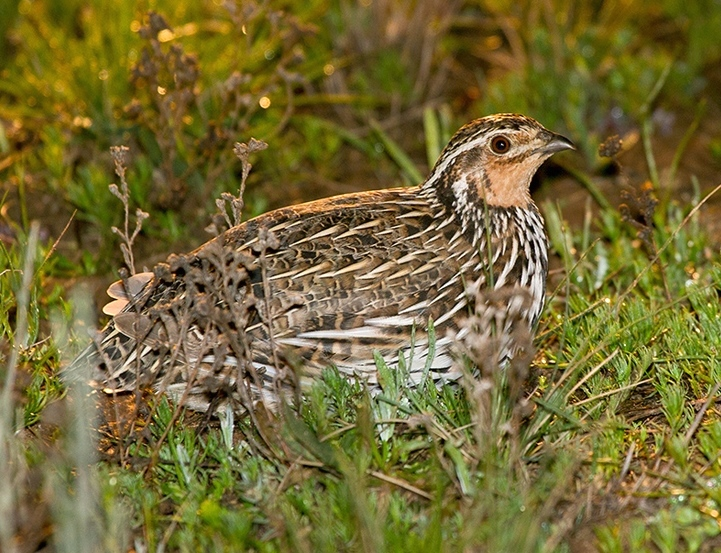

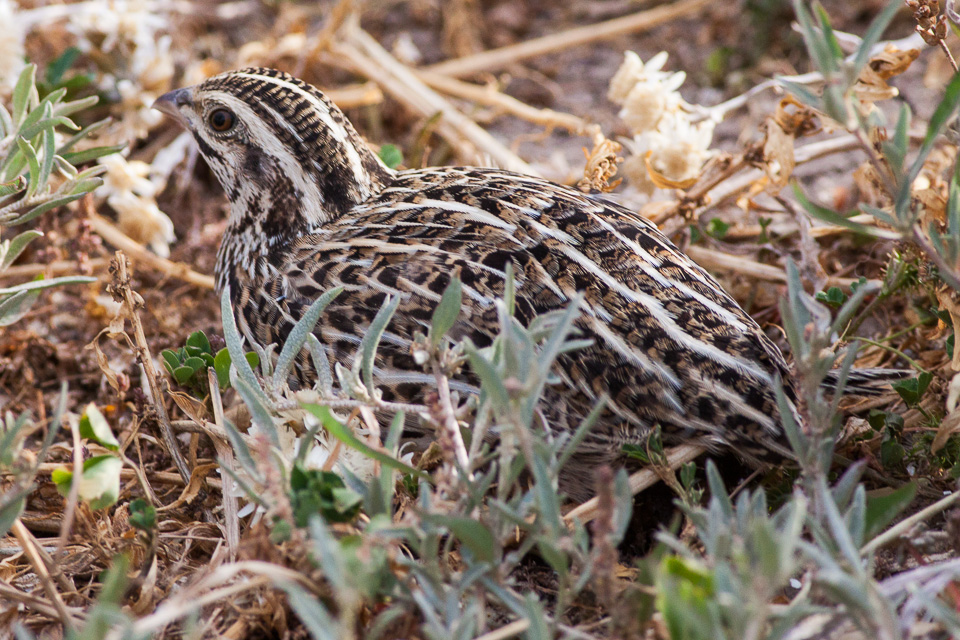
- In New South Wales and South Australia respectively

Conservation status
- Least Concern (IUCN 3.1)

Scientific classification
- Kingdom: Animalia
- Phylum: Chordata
- Class: Aves
- Order: Galliformes
- Family: Phasianidae
- Genus: Coturnix
- Species: C. pectoralis

Binomial name
- Coturnix pectoralis Gould, 1837
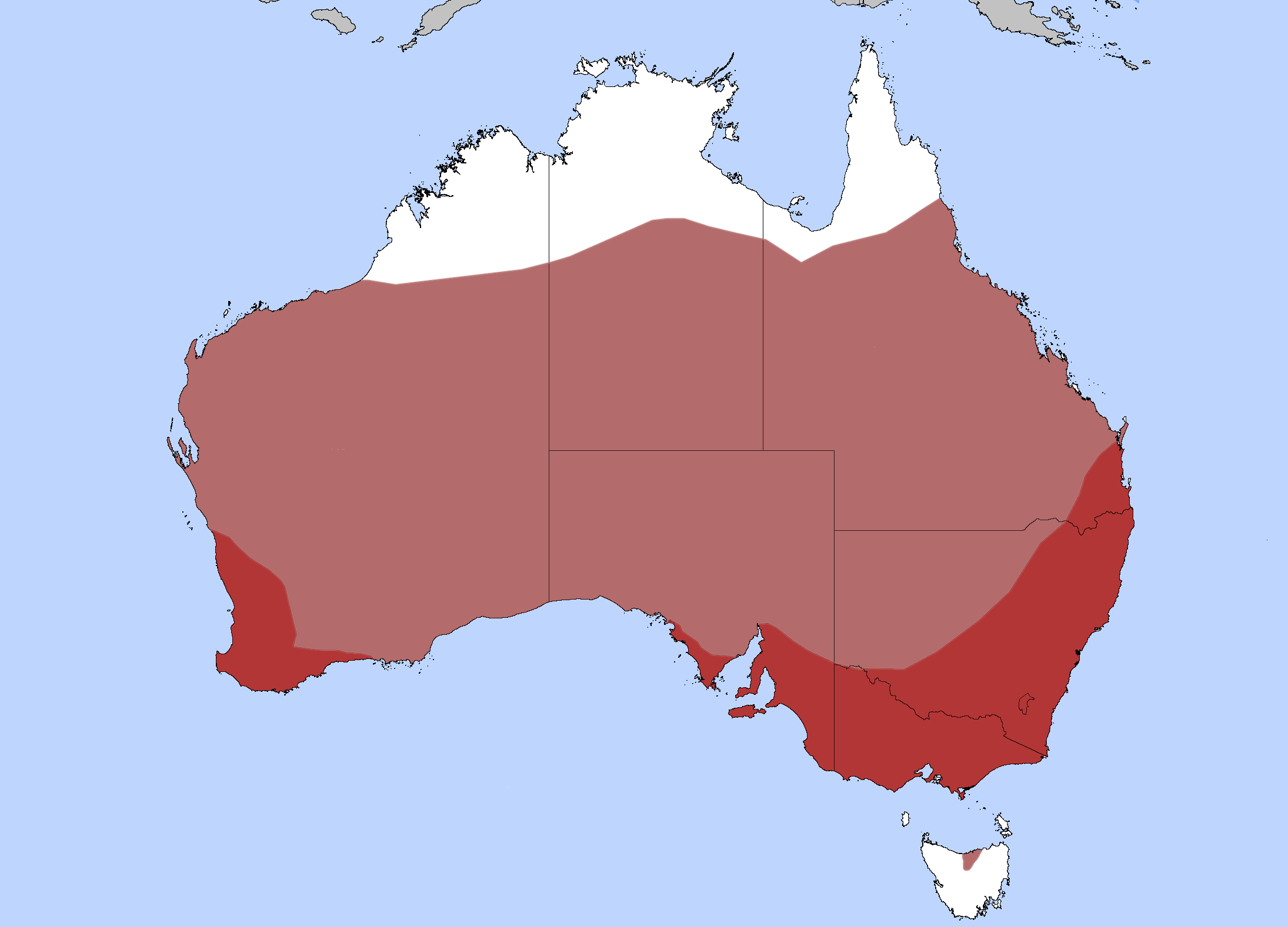
- Distribution common nomadic

= Stubble quail =

Species of bird

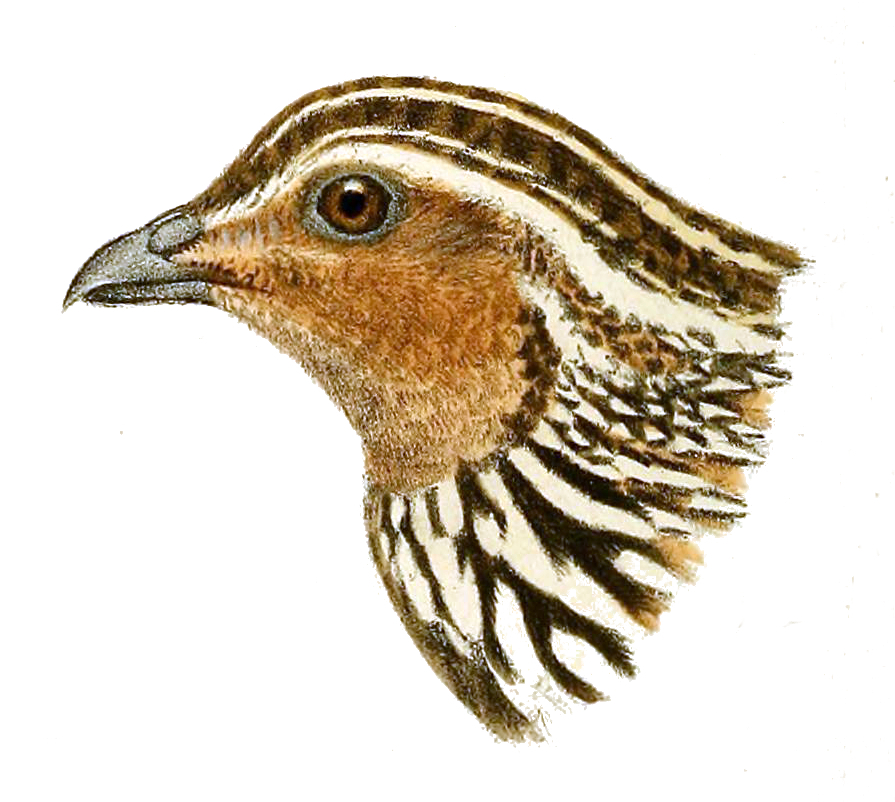
Drawing of the head of a stubble quail

The stubble quail (Coturnix pectoralis), whose other common names include grey quail and pectoral quail, is a species of Old World quail native to Australia. The species is widespread in mainland Australia and is listed as least concern by the IUCN, and can be found throughout all states and territories of Australia except Tasmania. It is the only native upland game bird that can be legally hunted in Australia, though with strict game law restrictions.

== Taxonomy ==
The stubble quail is a member of the family Phasianidae. C. pectoralis has sometimes been considered conspecific with the extinct New Zealand quail, C. novaezealandiae. In this case, the latter species' name would have priority and the stubble quail would become Coturnix novaezelandiae pectoralis. Phylogenetic analysis of three separate mitochondrial control region sequences in 2009 showed a close phylogenetic relationship between the two birds and it was confirmed that they are separate species. Geographic isolation occurred between the Australian species and the New Zealand species when the Tasman Sea became too wide for the birds to fly the journey. This geographic isolation enabled genetic divergence to occur and two separate species were produced. The two species then independently lost the ability to fly long distances.

== Description ==
The stubble quail is a ground dwelling bird that is characterised by its dark brown feathers with a cream coloured strip down the centre of each feather giving rise to stripes down the length of the bird. It is a plump species that is larger than other native quails. Male birds will mature at about 18.0–18.5 cm long and females are generally slightly larger. Adult males weigh around 100g and the females around 110g with all birds having a wingspan of between 25–33 cm. The stubble quail can also be identified by the loud whirring noise made by their wings during take-off into flight once disturbed from on the ground.

=== Similar species ===
The brown quail is also a member of the family Phasianidae that looks similar to the stubble quail; however, the brown quail appears darker in colour. The white streaks that are obvious on the back of the stubble quail are thinner and less obvious on the brown quail. The brown quail does not have white streaks underneath its body like the stubble quail, but has black horizontal bars instead. This makes the brown quail look much darker than the stubble quail in flight. The brown quail's wings produce a whistling noise when flushed, which is different from the whirring sound produced by the stubble quail's wings. The plains-wanderer is a highly endangered native species that looks very similar to the stubble quail but can be distinguished by its long yellow legs that can be observed during flight. The little buttonquail is a member of the family Turnicidae, but is another species that is sometimes confused with the stubble quail. The little button-quail is a smaller bird with short, round wings and often makes a call of alarm when flushed, whereas stubble quail are vocally silent.

== Distribution and habitat ==
Stubble quail are found in a diverse range of habitats from very dry parts of Australia to alpine grasslands. Stubble quail are more common in the high rainfall areas of southeastern and western Australia though are often found in the arid zone after above average rainfall. The species was found in all Australian states including Tasmania up until the 1940s to 1960s when they became extinct in Tasmania. On the mainland stubble quail are found in a variety of biomes but tend to avoid wooded areas as the canopy obstructs the growth of thick grassy undergrowth that they prefer. They prefer a habitat of tall grassland made up of native or introduced grasses, and crops. The density of the ground cover is highly important for stubble quail habitat as the birds prefer very dense vegetation. A high density of kangaroos and rabbits (or any grazing animal) in an area can decrease the height and density of grassland vegetation and make the habitat unsuitable for stubble quail. They are frequently found in agricultural areas after the harvest of cereal crops, where they feed on grain and insects.

== Behaviour ==
=== Breeding ===
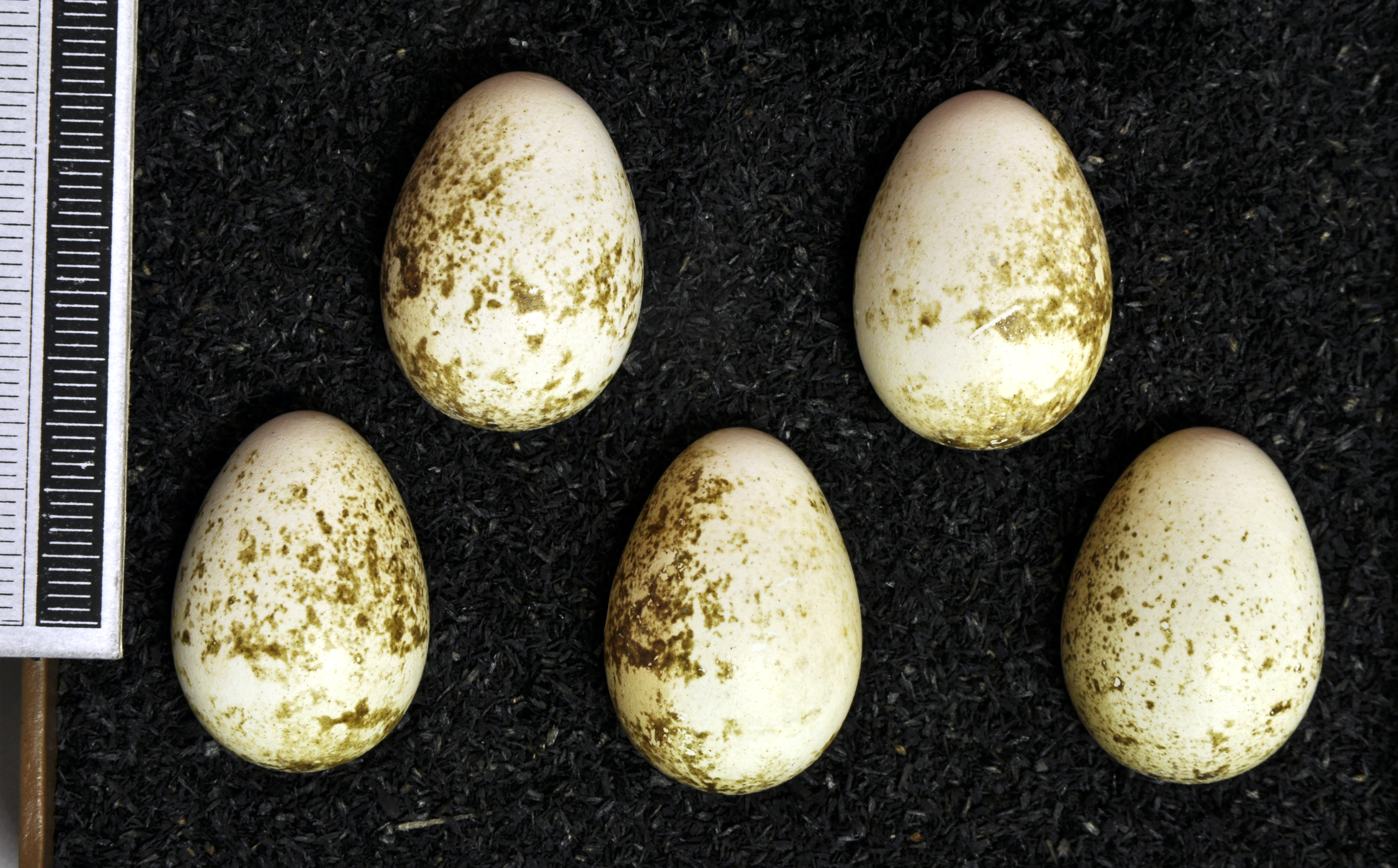
Eggs, Collection Museum Wiesbaden

In Victoria the stubble quail breed between August and December, but breeding season can vary due to environmental conditions. Breeding pairs may stay together for all year and if a pair is separated when flushed, they will call to each other in order to locate each other. The female stubble quail lays about seven or eight yellow eggs which are incubated solely by her for 18 days. Often stubble quail nest in crops that are about to be harvested so their nests get destroyed. Both parents guard the chicks until they are almost full-sized birds, but once the chicks reach six weeks and have a full plume of feathers, their parents remove the chicks from their own breeding grounds. Males call at dawn and dusk as a territorial display.

=== Travel ===
Stubble quail are nomadic and move to available resources; however, when resources are very limited, they tend to scatter in all directions. They can travel very long distances with the furthest recorded at 1142 km. Stubble quail are usually sighted individually or in pairs though are sometimes seen in small groups of up to 20 birds. Larger groups will be present in areas where the conditions are good.

=== Threats ===
Foxes and feral cats are their biggest predators, especially when nesting. Humans also reduce the numbers of stubble quail as they can legally be hunted in some parts of Australia. However, there are strict regulations (including bag limits and seasons) in place to ensure that they are not impacted when the population is vulnerable, such as during breeding, moulting and environmental stress.

== Evolutionary adaptations ==
The stubble quail has many evolutionary adaptations that enable it to live in very dry conditions. These include low daily water requirements, high tolerance of saline water and the ability to produce highly concentrated waste products. Highly concentrated urine is achieved by the large medulla in the kidney which is present in the stubble quail. If the birds have access to green foliage as well as grain, the stubble quail can survive without drinking any water. In areas where temperatures are very hot, stubble quail have been observed to forage during the night. Stubble quail that live in arid areas can have very irregular breeding patterns that are more dependent on environmental conditions than day length. This takes advantage of resources such as food and water, for their chicks. The stubble quail are thermally neutral at 30–35 °C so in some habitats where temperatures fall below 0 °C a large amount of energy is expended maintaining body temperature.
