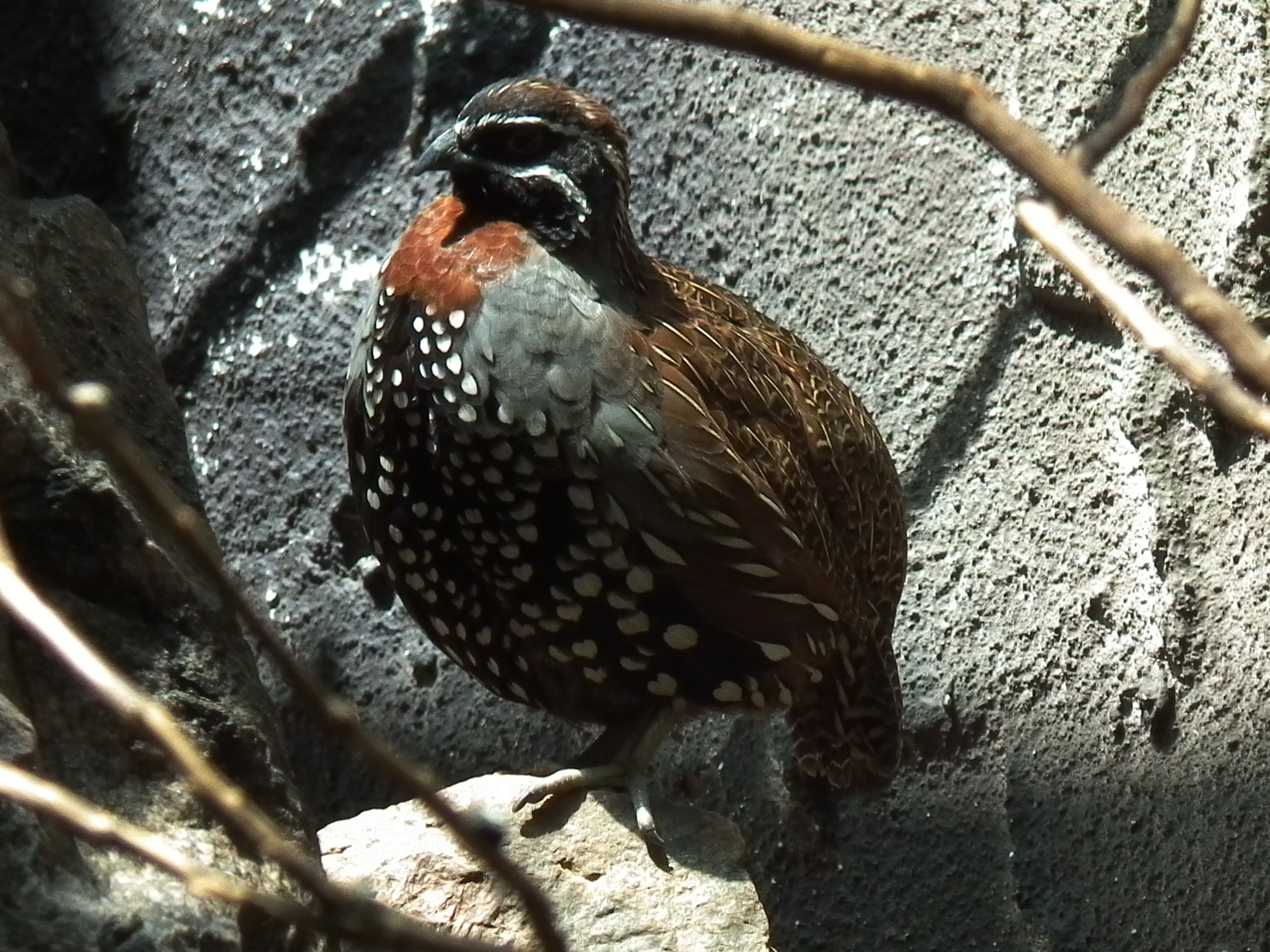
- At Landau Zoo

Conservation status
- Least Concern (IUCN 3.1)

Scientific classification
- Kingdom: Animalia
- Phylum: Chordata
- Class: Aves
- Order: Galliformes
- Family: Phasianidae
- Tribe: Coturnicini
- Genus: Margaroperdix; Reichenbach, 1853
- Species: M. madagarensis

Binomial name
- Margaroperdix madagarensis (Scopoli, 1786)

Synonyms
- Tetrao madagarensis (protonym); Margaroperdix madagascariensis

= Madagascar partridge =

Species of bird

The Madagascar partridge (Margaroperdix madagarensis) is a species of bird in the family Phasianidae. It is widespread across Madagascar (except extreme south). It has been introduced to Réunion and Mauritius.

Its natural habitats are subtropical or tropical moist lowland forest and subtropical or tropical moist montane forest.
