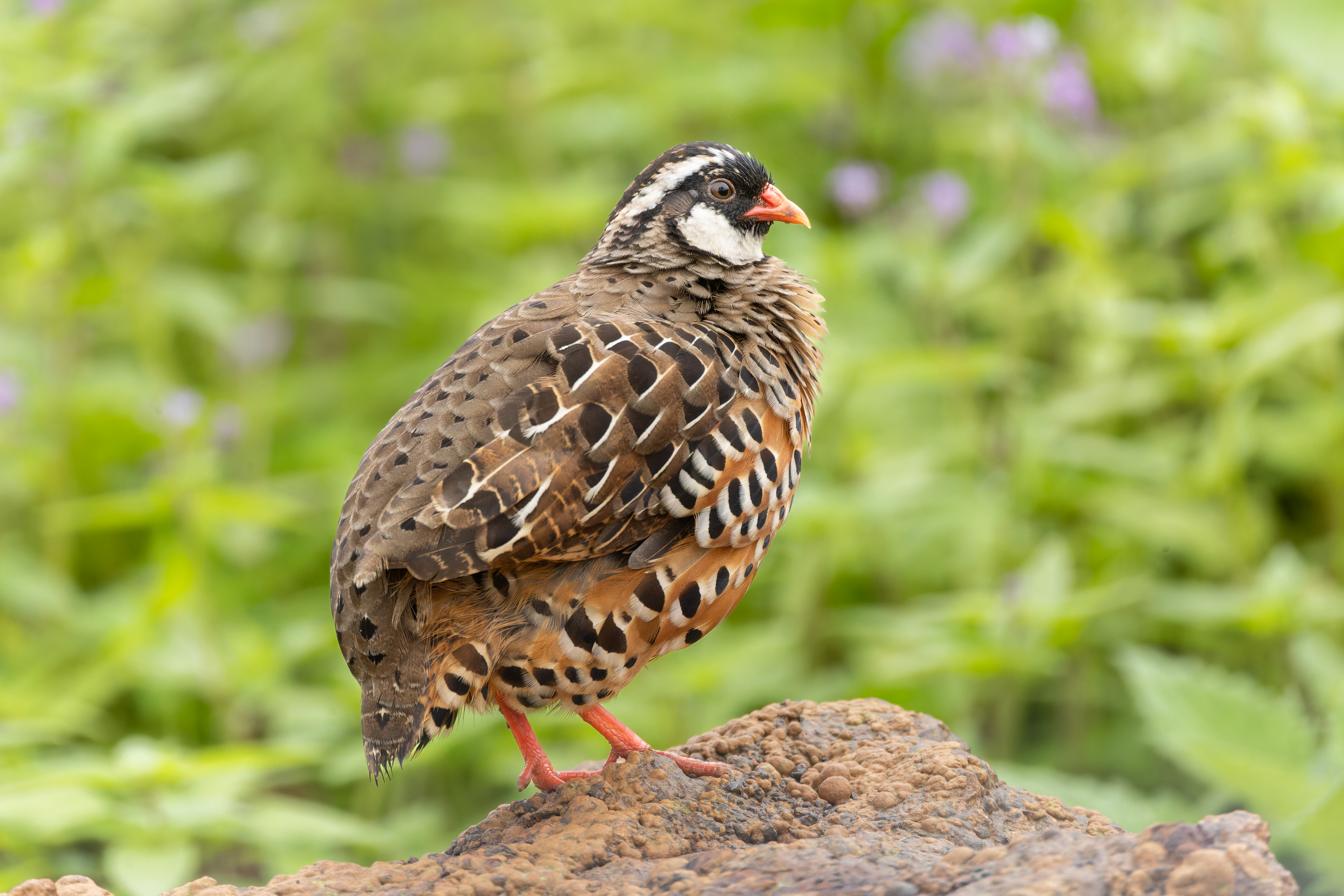
- A male in Mahabaleshwar, Maharashtra, India.

Conservation status
- Least Concern (IUCN 3.1)

Scientific classification
- Kingdom: Animalia
- Phylum: Chordata
- Class: Aves
- Order: Galliformes
- Family: Phasianidae
- Genus: Perdicula
- Species: P. erythrorhyncha

Binomial name
- Perdicula erythrorhyncha (Sykes, 1832)

Synonyms
- Microperdix erythrorhynchus Cryptoplectron erythrorhynchus Microperdix blewitti

= Painted bush quail =

Species of bird

The painted bush quail (Perdicula erythrorhyncha) is a species of quail found in the hill forests of India. They move in small coveys on hillsides and are distinguished by their red bills and legs. They have a liquid alarm call and small groups will run in single file along paths before taking flight when flushed.

== Description ==
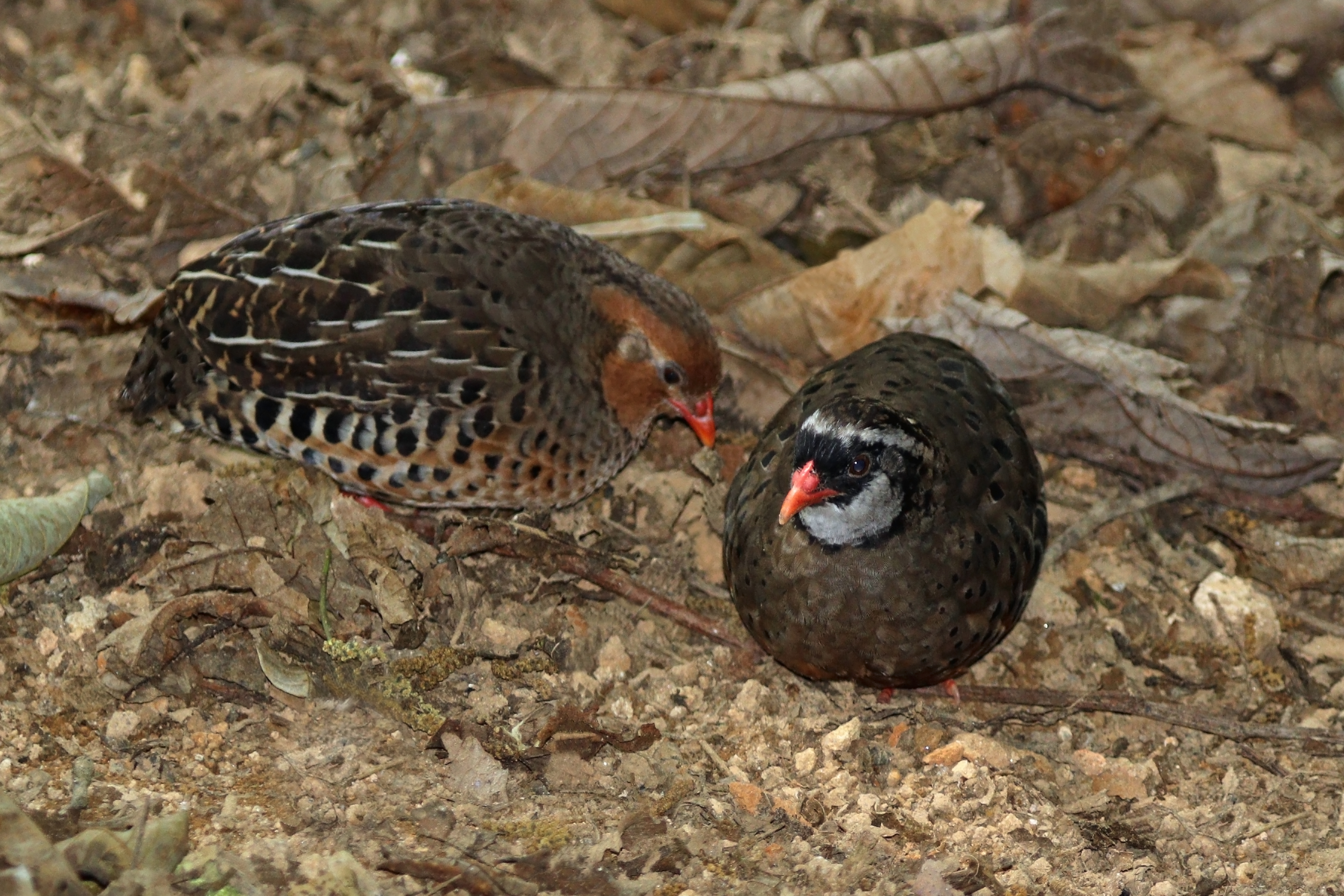
Female (left) and male.

This quail is darkish brightly colored with a deep red bill and legs, eye-catching even in flight. The female has brick-red underpart and lacks the white throat and head stripe of the male. The male has a black face with a white supercilium and throat. These quail are typically found in a covey of 6 to 10 birds. They come out in open grassy patches or on forest roads and cart tracks to feed on seeds or grain (and small insects) and dust-bathe in the morning and evening. The covey quickly reunites by the constant call of the members to one another. A series of soft whistles are heard when members of a scattered covey regroup. The territorial call of male is a pleasant, oft-repeated triple note kirikee-kirikee-kirikee.

It is 6.6–7.5 in (17–19 cm) long and weighs roughly 2.4–3.1 oz (68–88 g).

== Distribution and habitat ==
This species is mainly found in the hill forests of peninsular India. There are two apparently disjunct populations. Subspecies blewitti is found in the Satpuras and extends into the northern Eastern Ghats (East to Lammasinghi). This subspecies was described by Hume and named after F.R. Blewitt who sent him specimens from Raipur. The male has the frontal black band narrower and the white band around it being broader. The chestnut on the belly is paler. Overall, blewitti is smaller and paler than the nominate subspecies of the Western Ghats (south of Pune. Sykes described the nominate form based on specimens from the valley of "Karleh", 35 miles northwest of Pune), the Nilgiris and hills of southern India including the Biligirirangans and Shevaroys.

== Behaviour and ecology ==
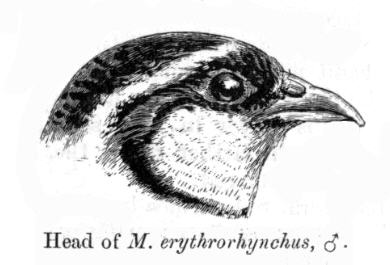
Head of male

These quails are usually seen in small groups of 8 to 10. When flushed they scatter in different directions and then begin rally calling to reunite. Males are believed to be monogynous. They are pugnacious and trappers are known to use decoy males to capture others. The call of the breeding male is a kirkee..kirkee and other calls include soft whistles which rises and falls in pitch. The nesting season varies locally, but is said to breed mainly in December to March. Nests are typically found in the ground at the root of a bush or grass clump, sometimes thinly lined with grass. The female lays 4 to 7 eggs at a time, which are incubated by the female alone for 16–18 days before hatching. Females are said to defend their young often by attacking dogs and even humans that intrude. Chicks are said to be able to fly at a very early age.

A flagellate parasite Hypotrichomonas avium (Parabasalia: Hypotrichomonadida) was described from a specimen found in the intestine of a painted bush quail.
