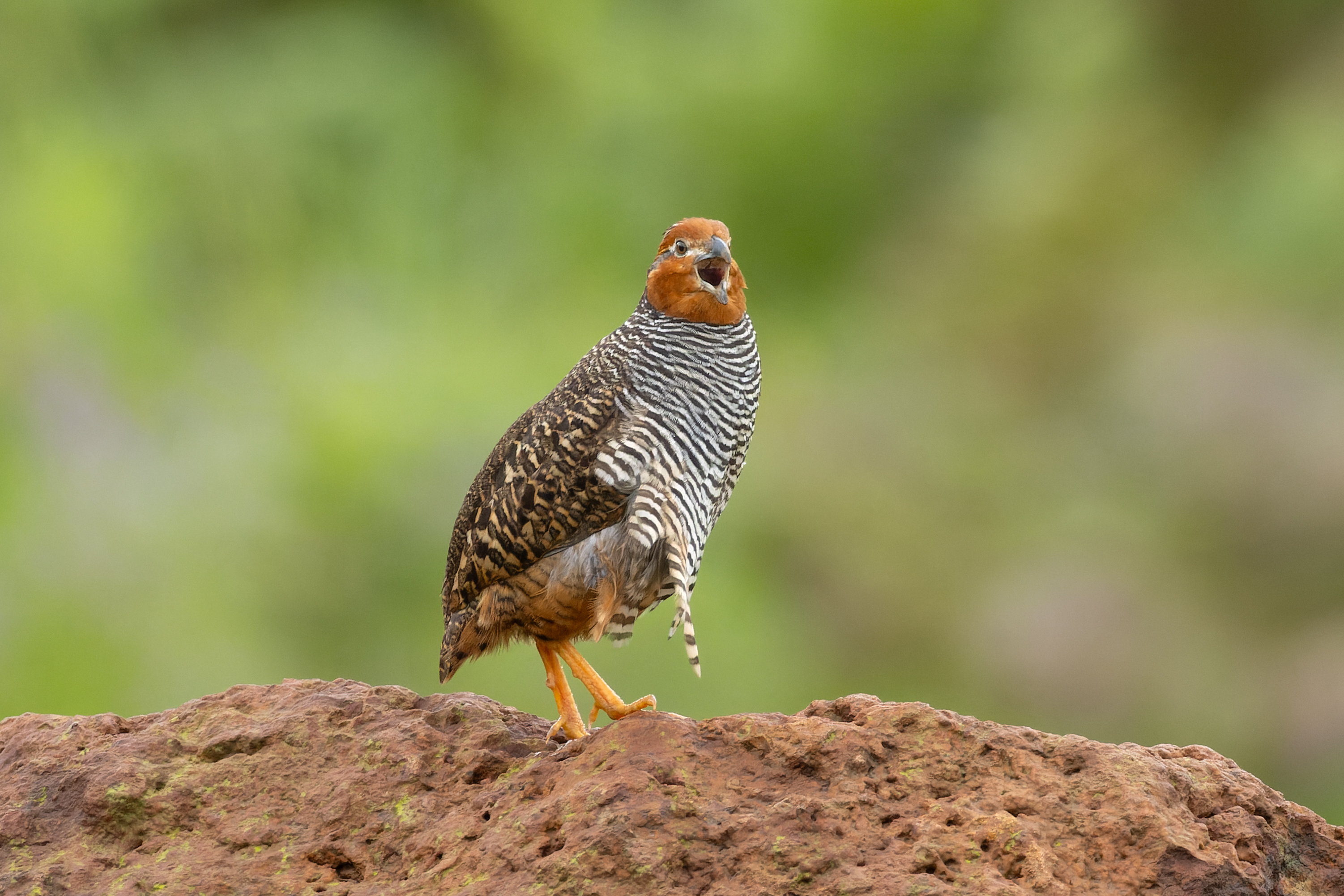
- Male
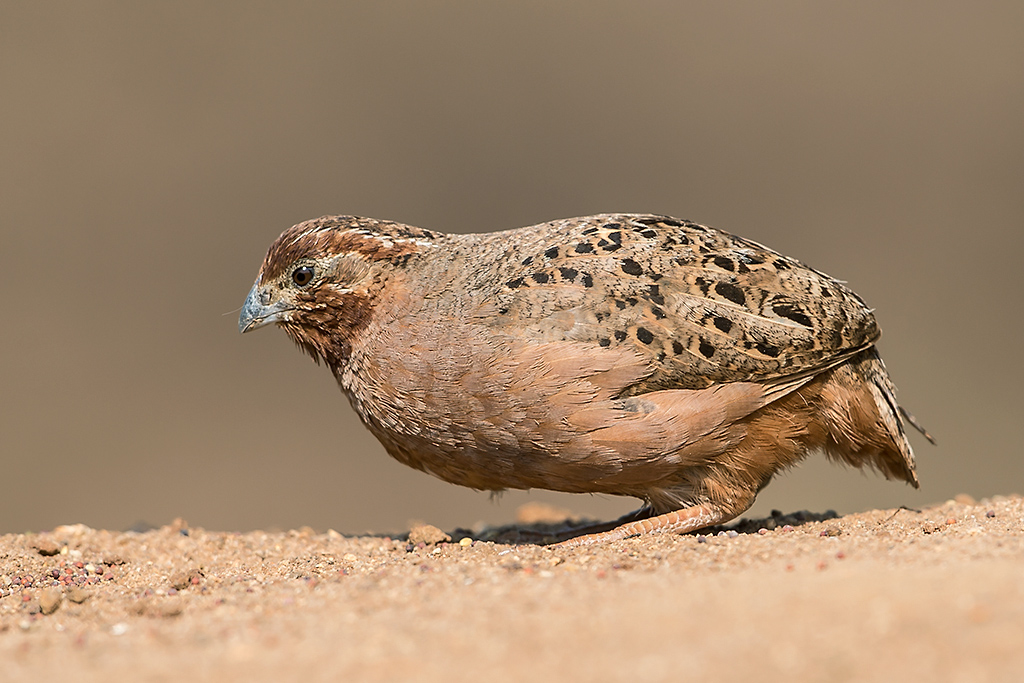
- Female

Conservation status
- Least Concern (IUCN 3.1)

Scientific classification
- Kingdom: Animalia
- Phylum: Chordata
- Class: Aves
- Order: Galliformes
- Family: Phasianidae
- Genus: Perdicula
- Species: P. asiatica

Binomial name
- Perdicula asiatica (Latham, 1790)

Synonyms
- Perdix asiatica Latham, 1790

= Jungle bush quail =

Species of bird from the Indian subcontinent

The jungle bush quail (Perdicula asiatica) is a species of quail in the family Phasianidae. It is native to the Indian subcontinent, where it is found in peninsular India and Sri Lanka. It has also been reported from Nepal but has not been seen there since the 19th century, and an introduced population exists on the island of Réunion.

A small species of quail 15–18 cm (5.9–7.1 in) long and weighing 57–82 g (2.0–2.9 oz), it shows significant sexual dimorphism. Males have brown upperparts with blackish and buff marking and whitish underparts with black barring. The face is mainly dark reddish-brown, with brown ear-coverts, a buffy-white moustachial stripe, and the supercilium turning whitish towards the back of the neck. Females have a similar pattern, but with pinkish-brown underparts, more uniform wings, and duller moustachial stripes.

The species inhabits dry areas with shrubby or rocky cover in a variety of habitats. It feeds on seeds and small insects, typically in small groups of 6–25 birds. Breeding starts at the end of the rains and lasts until the end of the cold season, with the exact timing varying across its range. It nests in shallow scrapes in cover and lays clutches of 4–8 eggs. Incubation is only done by the female. The International Union for Conservation of Nature considers the jungle bush quail to be of least concern due to its large range and stable population.

== Taxonomy and systematics ==
The jungle bush quail was originally described as Perdix asiatica by John Latham in 1790 based on specimens from the "Mahratta region". It was moved to the genus Perdicula, of which it is the type species, by Brian Hodgson in 1837. The generic name Perdicula is a Modern Latin diminutive of the genus Perdix, and means "small partridge". The specific epithet asiatica comes from the Latin asiaticus, meaning Asiatic. Jungle bush quail is the official common name designated by the International Ornithologists' Union. Other names for the species include jungle quail, jungle bush-quail, jungle bushquail, Ceylon jungle bush quail, and Konkan jungle bush quail.

=== Subspecies ===
There are five recognised subspecies of the jungle bush quail:

- P. a. asiatica (Latham, 1790): The nominate subspecies, it is found in north and central India.
- P. a. vidali Whistler & Kinnear, 1936: Found in southwest India, it has more reddish upperparts than the nominate subspecies, especially on the top of the head, and has broader barring on the underparts in males.
- P. a. ceylonensis Whistler & Kinnear, 1936: Found on Sri Lanka. Its upperparts and throat are much darker than those of other subspecies and its underparts contrast less strongly with the upperparts.
- P. a. punjaubi Whistler, 1939: Also known as the Punjab jungle bush quail, it is found in northwestern India. It is paler than the nominate subspecies, with sandier upperparts with less noticeable black markings.
- P. a. vellorei Abdulali & Reuben, 1965: Found in south India.

== Description ==
Jungle bush quails are a small species of quail, 15–18 cm (5.9–7.1 in) long and weighing 57–82 g (2.0–2.9 oz). Adult males have a dull brown mantle, back, scapulars and wings, with buff streaking and blackish-brown blotches. The breasts, flanks, and upper belly are whitish with narrow black barring, while the lower belly and undertail coverts are reddish-buff. The forehead, lores, and supercilium are dark reddish-brown, with the supercilium turning buffy-white behind the eye towards the back of the neck. The top of the head and back of the neck are dark reddish-brown with blackish-brown mottling, while the ear-coverts are dark brown. The chin and throat are also dark reddish-brown and are separated from the ear-coverts by a buffy-white moustachial stripe.

The species shows significant sexual dimorphism, with females having dull pinkish-brown underparts, more uniform and less barred wings with less blotching, and duller moustachial stripes. Some older females may develop pale barring on the breast. Juveniles are similar to the female, but have whitish streaks on the side of the head, throat, and breast. The upperparts have more markings and the primaries are mottled and barred. Males develop barring on the underparts during their first winter, around the age of three months. The bill is blackish in adult males and dull brownish-grey in all other plumages. The legs are pinkish to dull red and are reddest in males. The iris is pale to orange brown.

The jungle bush quail is unlikely to be confused with Turnix or Coturnix quails, but it may mistaken for the rock bush quail. The latter species is less sexually dimorphic and differs in the pattern of the eyestripe, which is shorter and whiter, and the throat, which is reddish-white with a white moustachial stripe.

=== Vocalisations ===
The advertising call of the jungle bush quail is a harsh, rhythmic chee-chee-chuck, chee-chee-chuck that is similar to the call of a black drongo in dispute. When flocks are separated, they reassemble using a low, whistling tiri-tiri-tiri or whi-whi-whi-whi-whi. Groups may also give burbling or grating notes that quicken into a frenzy. Other calls include a low chuckle made when flushed and harsh notes given as an alarm call.

== Distribution and habitat ==
The jungle bush quail is native to the Indian subcontinent, where it is found throughout peninsular India north to Gujarat, Odisha, and the Kashmir foothills, along with Sri Lanka. It has also been reported from Nepal, but has not been recorded there since the 19th century. It was introduced to Réunion around 1850 and to Mauritius around 1860, but the species is now locally extinct on the latter island.

It inhabits dry areas with shrubby or rocky cover, in habitats ranging from thin grasslands to dense deciduous forests. It is found at elevations up to 1,200 m (3,900 ft), but at elevations up to 1,500 m (4,900 ft) in the Western Ghats and southern India. It is generally non-migratory, but is possibly a migrant in Nepal.

== Behaviour and ecology ==
The jungle bush quail is typically seen in groups of 6–25 birds (called coveys) while dust bathing on tracks or foraging in grassland. Coveys walk along well-trodden paths to drink in the morning and evening, and create tunnel-like tracks through tall grass while doing so. The species prefers to walk or run away from potential danger, and will only fly away as a last resort. When alarmed, coveys will sit at the base of a bush before flying explosively into different directions. After a short time, they will start running and regroup by gathering towards each other's calls. Roosting occurs on the ground.

=== Diet ===
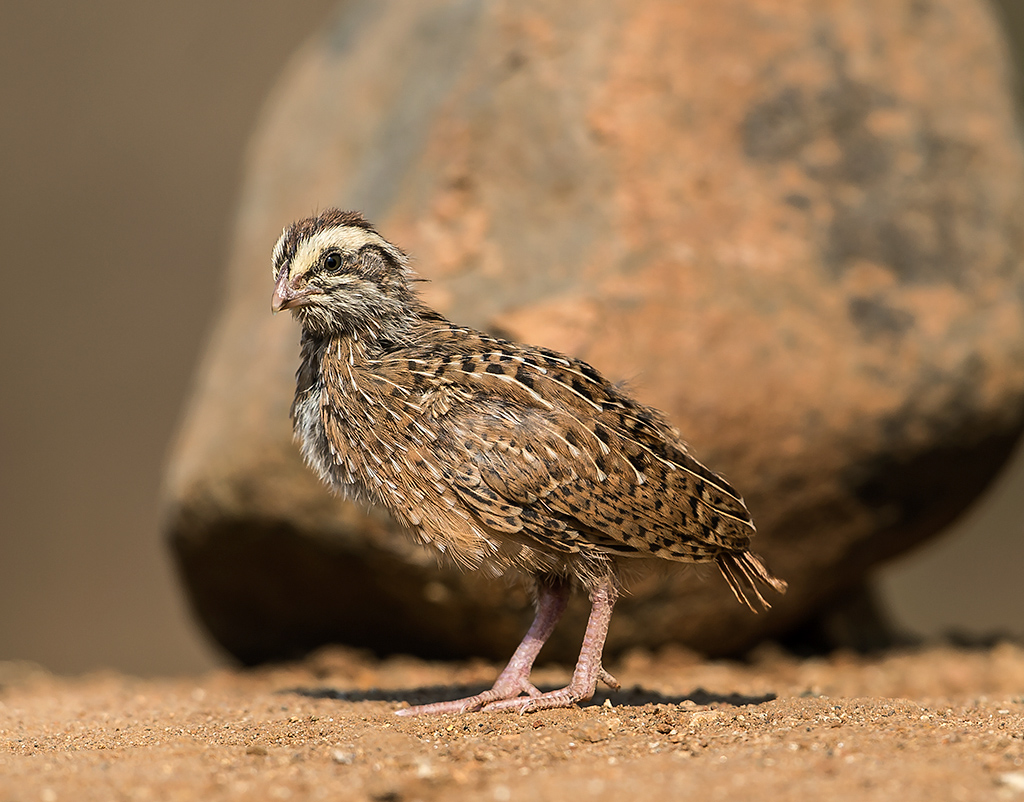
A jungle bush quail chick

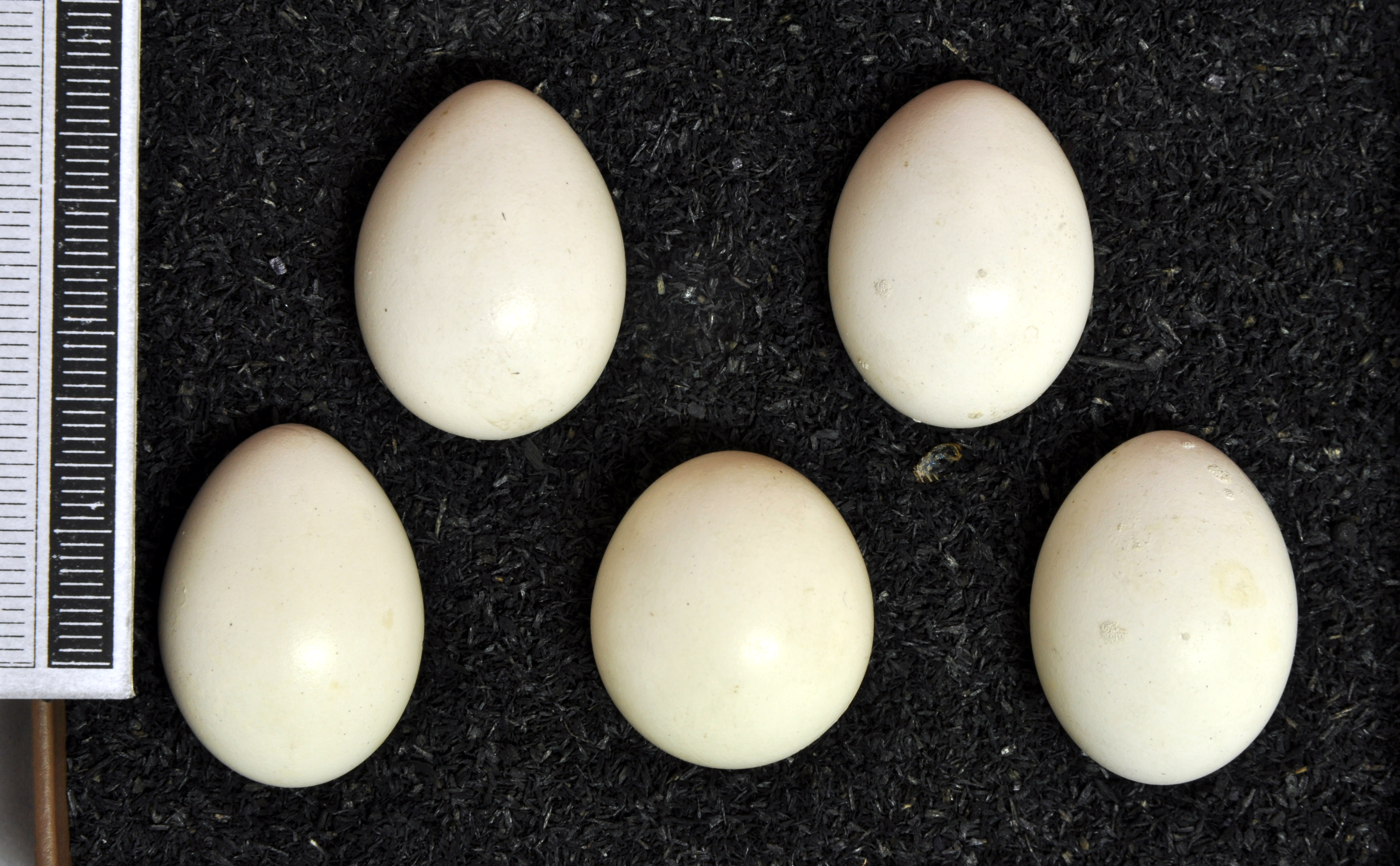
Eggs in the collection of the Museum Wiesbaden

The jungle bush quail feeds on seeds, such as those of grass, weeds, gram, and millets, along with small insects like termites and their larvae.

=== Breeding ===
The breeding season of the jungle bush quail starts with the end of the rains and lasts until the end of the cold season, with the exact period varying: from January to March in Karnataka, from October to March in the Deccan plateau, from August to April in central India, and from March to April in eastern central India and Sri Lanka. In Réunion, breeding occurs in November.

The species is seemingly monogamous. Nests are shallow grass-lined scrapes located in cover at the base of grass. Clutches can contain 4–8 eggs, but usually have 5–6. The eggs are creamy white to pale buff, and measure 24 mm–28.4 mm × 18.4 mm–22 mm (0.94 in–1.12 in × 0.72 in–0.87 in). Incubation takes 16–18 days in the wild and 21–22 days in captivity, and is done only by the female. After the eggs hatch, the male helps guard and raise the chicks.

=== Parasites and pathogens ===
The jungle bush quail has been observed being parasitised by the nematode Primasubulura alata. It has also been recorded being infected by the fungal pathogen Alternaria alternata in April.

=== In research ===
The jungle bush quail has been used in experiments on the effect of melatonin on immunity and reproduction, the effect of the environment on the pineal gland, adrenal glands, and gonads, daily variation in the melatonin and androgen receptors during the breeding season, and immunity associated with the lungs.

== Status ==
The jungle bush quail is listed as being of least concern by the International Union for Conservation of Nature (IUCN) on the IUCN Red List due to its large range and stable population. It is generally common throughout India, although it is reported to be uncommon in Kerala, and locally extinct in parts of Gujarat and in Uttara Kannada, Karnataka. In Sri Lanka, it was reportedly common until the 1950s, but is now only locally plentiful in the hills of the Uva Province. It has not been reported from Nepal since the 19th century, and reports from there and Cachar in Assam may be erroneous. The introduced population on Réunion is declining but still locally common, while the one on Mauritius is extinct. The jungle bush quail is hunted for food in rural regions.
