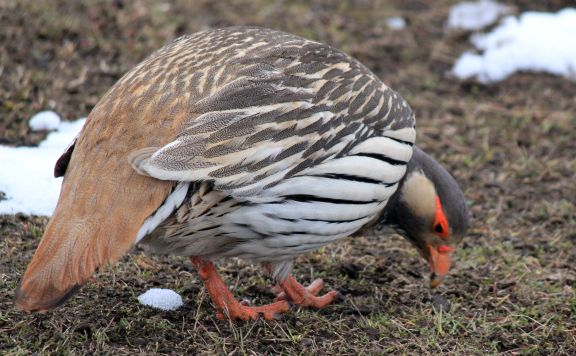
- Tibetan snowcock (Tetraogallus tibetanus)

Scientific classification
- Kingdom: Animalia
- Phylum: Chordata
- Class: Aves
- Order: Galliformes
- Family: Phasianidae
- Tribe: Coturnicini
- Genus: Tetraogallus; J.E. Gray, 1832

Type species
- Tetraogallus nigelli J.E. Gray = Tetraogallus himalayensis G.R. Gray

Species
- See text

= Snowcock =

Snowcocks

Genus of birds

The snowcocks or snowfowl are a group of bird species in the genus Tetraogallus of the pheasant family, Phasianidae. They are ground-nesting birds that breed in the mountain ranges of southern Eurasia from the Caucasus to the Himalayas and western China. Some of the species have been introduced into the United States. Snowcocks feed mainly on plant material.

== Characteristics ==
Snowcocks are bulky, long-necked, long-bodied partridge-like birds. Males and females are generally similar in appearance but females tend to be slightly smaller and rather duller in colouration than males. They are generally grey with varying amounts of white, black and brown according to species and with distinctive white under tail-coverts. Their plumage is thick with a downy base to the feathers which helps them to withstand severe winter temperatures that may fall to −40 °C (−40 °F). The colour of juvenile snowcocks is similar to the colour of the females and the young are not fully grown until their second year of life.

Snowcocks are heavy birds and are unable to fly far with flapping flight. Instead they run to a high point, launch themselves into the air and glide, gradually losing altitude. They are to be found on open slopes above the tree line where they feed on leaves, shoots, roots, fruits, berries and insects.

== Distribution ==
The snowcocks are each endemic to different mountain ranges in Asia where they are normally found on open slopes above the tree line. Only in the case of the Himalayan snowcock and the Tibetan snowcock do their ranges overlap.

The Caucasian snowcock occurs in the Caucasus Mountains in Azerbaijan, Georgia and the Russian Federation. It has been introduced into the United States. The Caspian snowcock is native to eastern Turkey, Armenia, Azerbaijan, Iran, Iraq and Georgia and has been introduced into the United States. The Tibetan snowcock is native to mountain ranges in India, Nepal, Bhutan, Tajikistan and China. The Himalayan snowcock occurs in mountainous areas of Afghanistan, Tajikistan, Turkmenistan, Uzbekistan, Kazakhstan, Kyrgyzstan, Pakistan, Nepal, India and China and has been introduced into the United States. The Altai snowcock is endemic to high altitudes in Kazakhstan, Mongolia, China and the Russian Federation.

== Species ==
The five species within the genus along with subspecies are:

Image	Name	Common name	Subspecies	Distribution
	Tetraogallus tibetanus Gould, 1854	Tibetan snowcock	T. t. tibetanus Gould, 1854; T. t. tschimenensis Sushkin, 1926; T. t. centralis Sushkin, 1926; T. t. przewalskii Bianchi, 1907; T. t. henrici Oustalet, 1891; T. t. aquilonifer R. & A. Meinertzhagen, 1926	the Western Himalayas and the Tibetan Plateau
	Tetraogallus altaicus (Gebler, 1836)	Altai snowcock	T. a. altaicus (Gebler, 1836); T. a. orientalis Sushkin, 1926	Mongolia, China, Kazakhstan and Russia.
	Tetraogallus caucasicus (Pallas, 1811)	Caucasian snowcock		Caucasus Mountains
	Tetraogallus caspius (Gmelin, 1784)	Caspian snowcock	T. c. caspius (Gmelin, 1784); T. c. semenowtianschanskii Zarudny, 1908	eastern Turkey, Armenia, Azerbaijan and throughout the Alborz Mountains of Northern Iran.
	Tetraogallus himalayensis Gray, 1843	Himalayan snowcock	T. h. himalayensis Gray, 1843; T. h. grombczewskii Bianchi, 1898; T. h. koslowi Bianchi, 1898	Central and South Asia above the treeline and near the snowline
