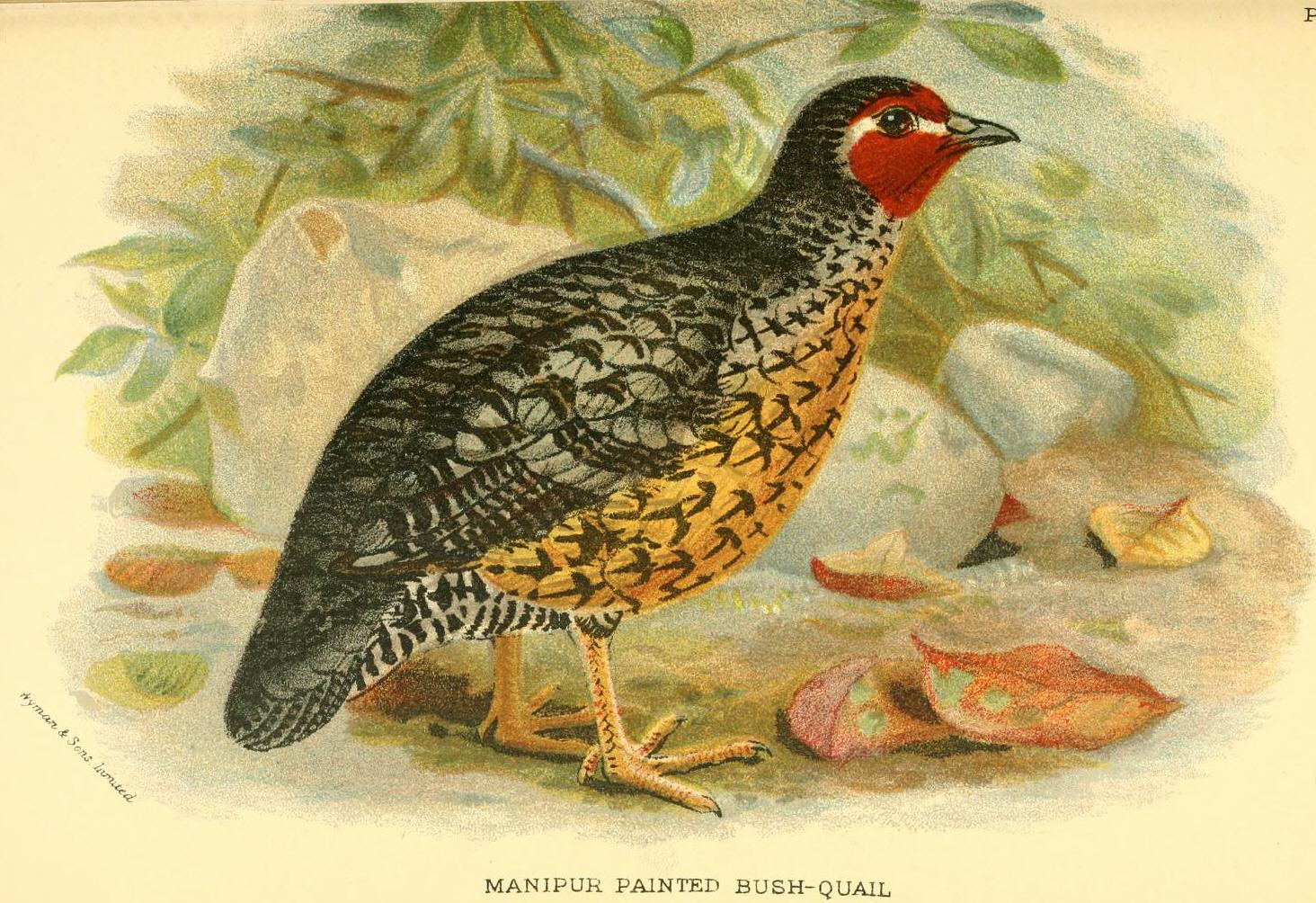

Conservation status
- Critically Endangered (IUCN 3.1)

Scientific classification
- Kingdom: Animalia
- Phylum: Chordata
- Class: Aves
- Order: Galliformes
- Family: Phasianidae
- Genus: Perdicula
- Species: P. manipurensis

Binomial name
- Perdicula manipurensis Hume, 1881

= Manipur bush quail =

Species of bird

The Manipur bush quail (Perdicula manipurensis) is a species of quail found in northeastern India and possibly Bangladesh, inhabiting damp grassland, particularly stands of tall grass. It was first collected and described by Allan Octavian Hume on an ornithological expedition to Manipur in 1881.

P. manipurensis was uplisted from Endangered to Critically Endangered in the October 2024 IUCN Red List update (version 2024-2) under Criterion D, on the basis that any surviving population is estimated at 1–200 mature individuals.

There was no confirmed sighting of the bird from 1932 until June 2006, when Anwaruddin Choudhury reported spotting the quail in Manas, Assam. An earlier unconfirmed observation had been made from Dibru-Saikhowa Wildlife Sanctuary in March 1998.

BBC News quoted the conservation director of the Wildlife Trust of India, Rahul Kaul, as saying, "This creature has almost literally returned from the dead."

== History ==
A 1911 report by Frank Finn, based on Captain Wood's field notes of 1899, noted that the species was common in the past. Wood noted that the bird was commonly trapped by Manipur people after bush fires and that the local name was lanz-soibol meaning "trap quail".

== Habitat ==
The species is classified as a grassland specialist. It inhabits damp grasslands, particularly tall, dense stands such as those of elephant grass, and is also recorded from bogs and swamps, in vegetation up to 3 m (occasionally up to 5 m) tall, from the foothills up to about 1,000 m. Historical records indicate that it was generally encountered in small groups of 4–12, was shy and reluctant to fly, and bred between January and May.

== Geographic range ==
The nominate race P. m. manipurensis occurs in Manipur and neighbouring Assam south of the Brahmaputra, while the race inglisi occurs from northern West Bengal to Assam north of the Brahmaputra. There are also unconfirmed historical records from Nagaland and Meghalaya in India and from Chittagong, the Chittagong Hill Tracts and Sylhet in Bangladesh. Given the lack of recent records and the scarcity of remaining suitable grassland habitat, any surviving population is thought to be very small and fragmented, most likely persisting in Assam.

The extent of occurrence is estimated at 144,000 km².

== Conservation status ==
The species has been treated as globally threatened since 1988. It was listed as Vulnerable from 1988 to 2012, uplisted to Endangered in 2013, and uplisted again to Critically Endangered in October 2024 under Criterion D. The 2024 assessment estimates the population at 1–200 mature individuals, with the trend unknown owing to the near-complete absence of confirmed records since 1932.

Three Important Bird Areas have been identified for the species in India: the Dibru-Saikhowa Complex, Buxa Tiger Reserve and the Manas Reserve Forest, together covering about 1,400 km².

=== Threats ===
Drainage and conversion of tall grasslands to agriculture and tea plantations have greatly reduced and fragmented the species' habitat, particularly in Manipur and Bangladesh. The historical type-locality cluster at Mornoi in Assam has been replaced by tea estates. Annual burning of grasslands in protected areas of Assam and northern West Bengal coincides with the January to May breeding season and may both restrict available breeding habitat and increase predation risk. Livestock grazing affects much of the range. Hunting was historically a major pressure and continues in Manipur and Nagaland, although it is largely absent from the Assam protected-area network where any remaining population is most likely to persist.

The State of India's Birds 2023 assessment lists the Manipur bush quail among India's grassland specialists that have undergone the steepest long-term declines, in line with continent-wide losses of natural grasslands.

=== Conservation actions ===
The most urgent recommended action is to attempt to rediscover the species through targeted surveys at likely sites; depending on the outcome, an action plan focused on site and population protection would then be developed. No action-recovery plan, systematic monitoring scheme or ex-situ programme is currently in place.

== Gallery ==
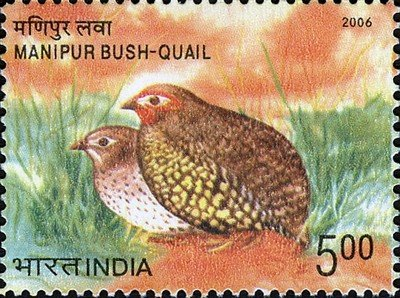
