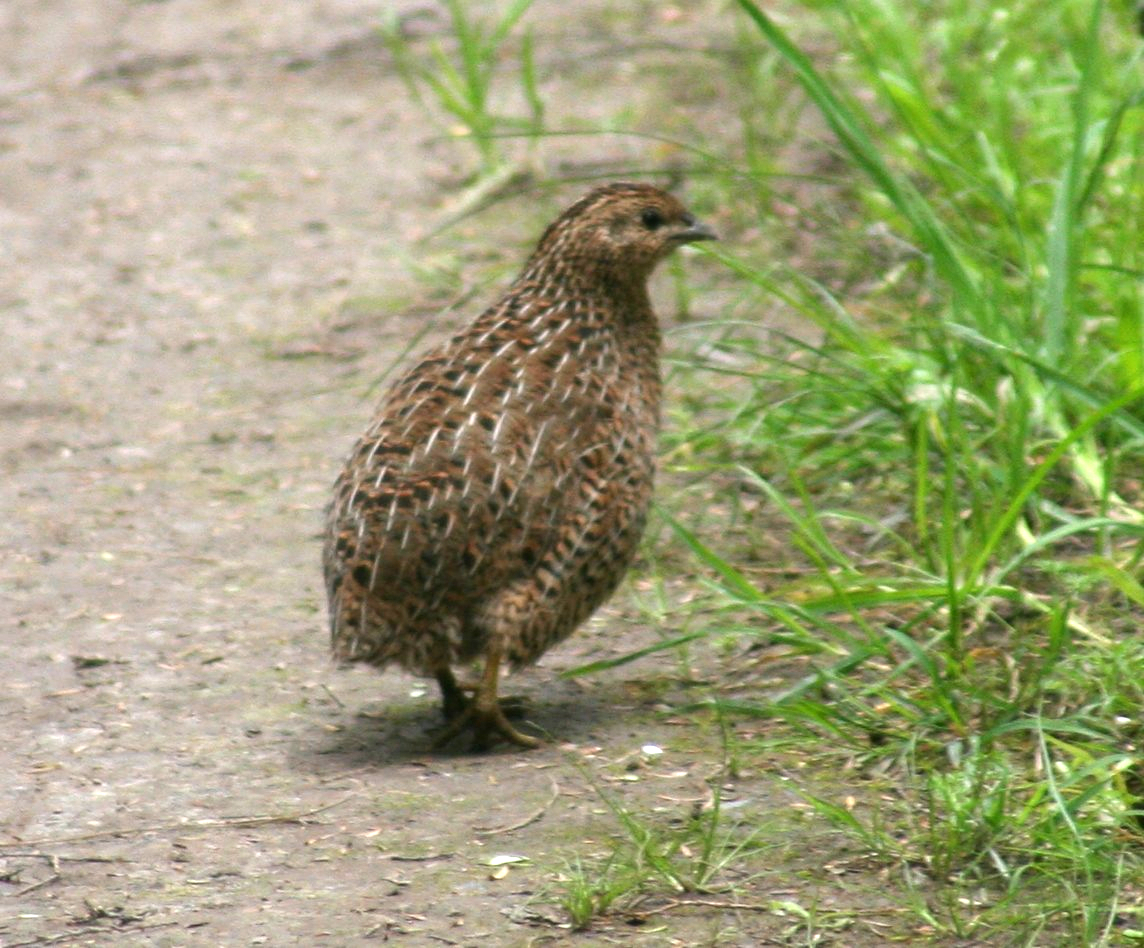
- Brown quail (Synoicus ypsilophorus)

Scientific classification
- Kingdom: Animalia
- Phylum: Chordata
- Class: Aves
- Order: Galliformes
- Superfamily: Phasianoidea

Groups included
- Colinus; Callipepla; Oreortyx; Philortyx; Cyrtonyx; Rhynchortyx; Dactylortyx; Odontophorus; Ophrysia; Perdicula; Coturnix; Synoicus

Cladistically included but traditionally excluded taxa
- Numididae; Ptilopachus; Dendrortyx; Rollulinae; Lerwa; Ithaginis; Lophophorini; Pucrasia; Meleagridini; Tetraonini; Rhizothera; Perdix; Phasianini; Alectoris; Tetraogallus; Ammoperdix; Margaroperdix; Pternistis; Galloperdix; Tropicoperdix; Haematortyx; Polyplectron; Pavonini; Gallini

= Quail =

Index of birds with the same name

Call of a male common quail (Coturnix coturnix)

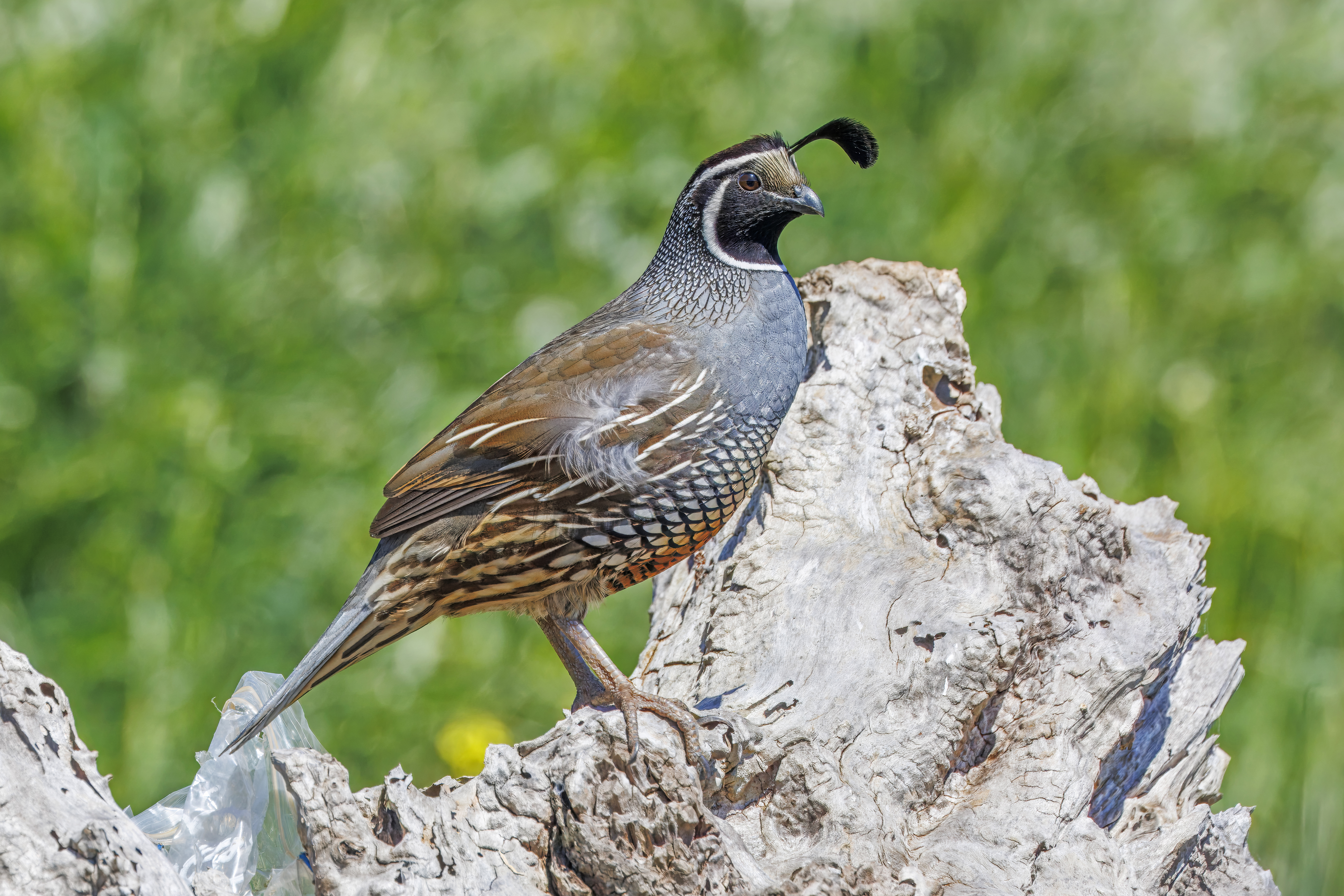
California quail (Callipepla californica)

Quail is a collective name for several genera of mid-sized birds generally placed in the order Galliformes. The collective noun for a group of quail is a flock, covey, or bevy.

Old World quail are placed in the family Phasianidae, and New World quail are placed in the family Odontophoridae. The species of buttonquail are named for their superficial resemblance to quail, and form the family Turnicidae in the order Charadriiformes. The king quail, an Old World quail, often is sold in the pet trade, and within this trade is commonly, though mistakenly, referred to as a "button quail". Many of the common larger species are farm-raised for table food or egg consumption, and are hunted on game farms or in the wild, where they may be released to supplement the wild population, or extend into areas outside their natural range. In 2007, 40 million quail were produced in the United States.

== New World ==
- Genus Callipepla
  - Scaled quail, (commonly called blue quail) Callipepla squamata
  - Elegant quail, Callipepla douglasii
  - California quail, Callipepla californica
  - Gambel's quail, Callipepla gambelii
- Genus Cyrtonyx
  - Montezuma quail, Cyrtonyx montezumae
  - Ocellated quail, Cyrtonyx ocellatus
- Genus Dactylortyx
  - Singing quail, Dactylortyx thoracicus
- Genus Philortyx
  - Banded quail, Philortyx fasciatus
- Genus Colinus
  - Northern bobwhite, Colinus virginianus
  - Black-throated bobwhite, Colinus nigrogularis
  - Spot-bellied bobwhite, Colinus leucopogon
  - Crested bobwhite, Colinus cristatus
- Genus Odontophorus
  - Marbled wood quail, Odontophorus gujanensis
  - Spot-winged wood quail, Odontophorus capueira
  - Black-eared wood quail, Odontophorus melanotis
  - Rufous-fronted wood quail, Odontophorus erythrops
  - Black-fronted wood quail, Odontophorus atrifrons
  - Chestnut wood quail, Odontophorus hyperythrus
  - Dark-backed wood quail, Odontophorus melanonotus
  - Rufous-breasted wood quail, Odontophorus speciosus
  - Tacarcuna wood quail, Odontophorus dialeucos
  - Gorgeted wood quail, Odontophorus strophium
  - Venezuelan wood quail, Odontophorus columbianus
  - Black-breasted wood quail, Odontophorus leucolaemus
  - Stripe-faced wood quail, Odontophorus balliviani
  - Starred wood quail, Odontophorus stellatus
  - Spotted wood quail, Odontophorus guttatus
- Genus Oreortyx
  - Mountain quail, Oreortyx pictus
- Genus Rhynchortyx
  - Tawny-faced quail, Rhynchortyx cinctus

== Old World ==
- Genus Coturnix
  - Common quail (also called Pharaoh, Bible, European or Nile quail), Coturnix coturnix
  - Japanese quail, Coturnix japonica
  - Stubble quail, Coturnix pectoralis
  - †New Zealand quail, Coturnix novaezelandiae (extinct)
  - Rain quail, Coturnix coromandelica
  - Harlequin quail, Coturnix delegorguei
  - †Canary Islands quail, Coturnix gomerae (fossil)
  - †Madeira quail, Coturnix lignorum, (fossil)
  - †Porto Santo quail, Coturnix alabrevis, (fossil)
  - †Cape Verde quail, Coturnix centensis, (fossil)
- Genus Synoicus
  - Brown quail, Synoicus ypsilophorus
  - Blue quail, Synoicus adansonii
  - King quail, Synoicus chinensis
  - Snow Mountain quail, Synoicus monorthonyx
- Genus Perdicula
  - Jungle bush quail, Perdicula asiatica
  - Rock bush quail, Perdicula argoondah
  - Painted bush quail, Perdicula erythrorhyncha
  - Manipur bush quail, Perdicula manipurensis
- Genus Ophrysia
  - Himalayan quail, Ophrysia superciliosa (critically endangered/extinct)

== See also ==
- Quail eggs
- Domesticated quail
