= Northern Salle's quail =

Conservation status
- Near Threatened (IUCN 3.1)

Scientific classification
- Domain: Eukaryota
- Kingdom: Animalia
- Phylum: Chordata
- Class: Aves
- Order: Galliformes
- Family: Odontophoridae
- Genus: Cyrtonyx
- Species: C. sallei
- Subspecies: C. s. sallei

Trinomial name
- Cyrtonyx sallei sallei Verreaux, 1859

Nominate subspecies of bird

Northern Salle's quail (Cyrtonyx sallei sallei), is the nominate subspecies of Salle's quail that is native to parts of southern Michoacán, Guerrero, and south to western Oaxaca, Mexico. It partially has the same traits, and appearance to that of the other Salle's quail subspecies, Rowley's quail (Cyrtonyx sallei rowleyi).
