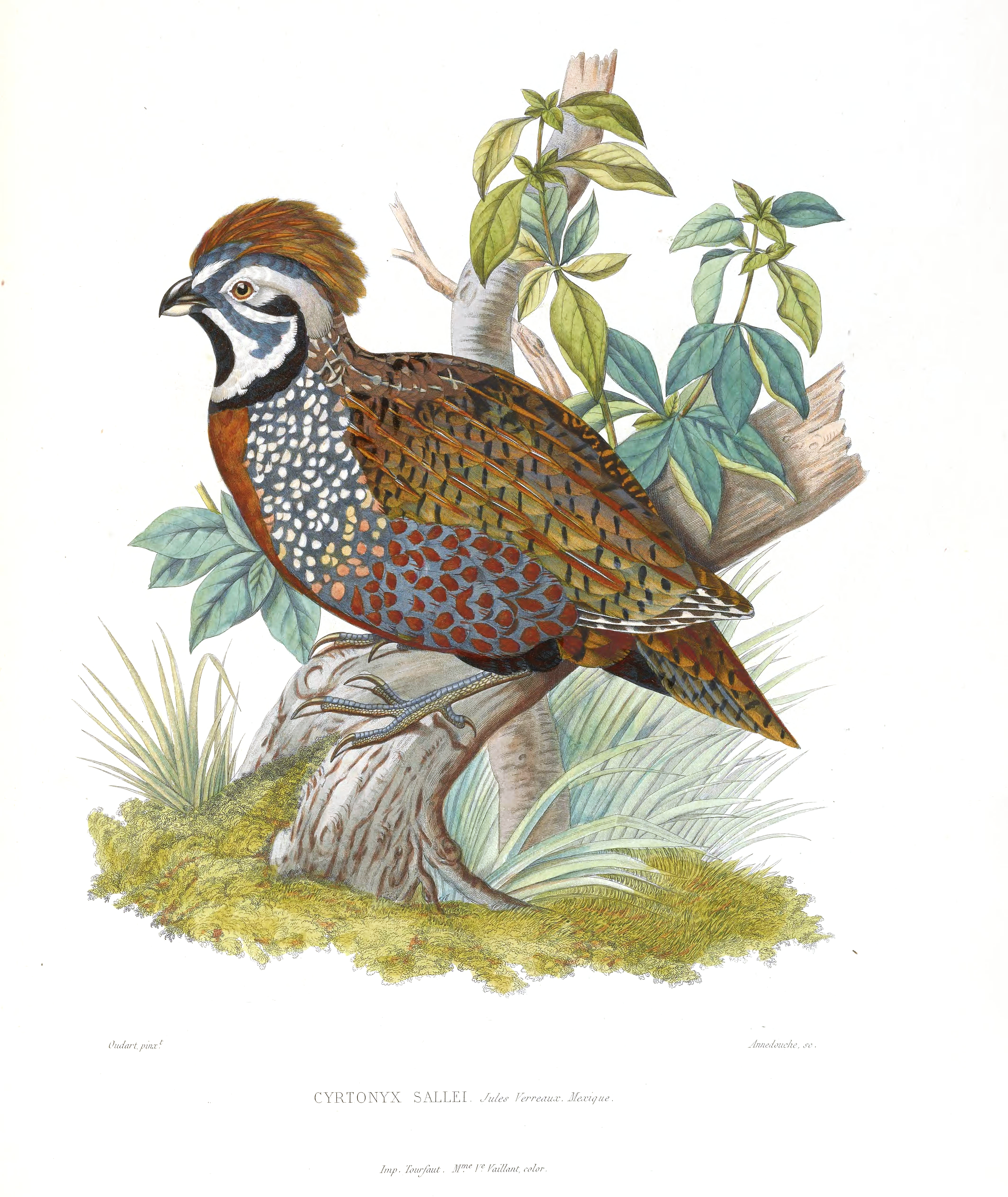

Conservation status
- Near Threatened (IUCN 3.1)

Scientific classification
- Kingdom: Animalia
- Phylum: Chordata
- Class: Aves
- Order: Galliformes
- Superfamily: Phasianoidea
- Family: Odontophoridae
- Genus: Cyrtonyx
- Species: C. sallei

Binomial name
- Cyrtonyx sallei Verreaux, 1859

Subspecies
- C. s. sallei (Verreaux, 1859); C. s. rowleyi (Phillips, 1966)

Synonyms
- Cyrtonyx montezumae sallei Vigors, 1830

= Salle's quail =

Species of bird

Salle's quail (Cyrtonyx sallei), or the spot-breasted quail, is a species of quail that is native to southern Mexico, primarily within the states of Michoacán, Oaxaca, and Guerrero, with some individuals potentially present in Puebla.

== Taxonomy ==
Salle's quail was originally listed as a subspecies of the Montezuma quail, although the general coloration, behavior, and range revealed a potential need for re-classification. It was then brought upwards to its now standing taxonomic rank, being species. Many sources and individuals still believe it is a subspecies even today. It shares the Cyrtonyx genus with two species; the Ocellated quail and the Montezuma quail.

== Subspecies ==
Two subspecies are partially recognized of Salle's quail, being:

- C. s. sallei (Verreaux, 1859) - just Salle's quail or the northern Salle's quail: the nominate subspecies; found throughout parts of Michoacán to Guerrero and Oaxaca, Mexico.
- C. s. rowleyi (Phillips, 1966) - Rowley's quail or the southern Salle's quail: disputed taxonomic rank; endemic to the Sierra de Miahuatlán of Oaxaca and Guerrero, Mexico.

Rowley's quail was originally listed as a subspecies of the Montezuma quail, but has now been shown to be morphologically similar to Salle's quail, revising its taxonomic status as such.

== Description ==
Salle's quail on average reaches a length of 20–22 cm (8–9 in), being very rotund. Body has an orange-rufous coloration on the lower parts, to a grey-brown with black barring on the upper parts, and a black-white face pattern. Wing coverts have a distinct bright red streaking. Cyrtonyx ocellatus and Cyrtonyx montezumae both have similar face patterns, but Salle's quail has a unique brown-orange coloration, which distinguishes it from both closely related species.

== Distribution and habitat ==
Salle's quail is endemic to Michoacán, Oaxaca, and Guerrero of southern Mexico. One subspecies, Cyrtonyx sallei rowleyi is endemic to the Sierra de Miahuatlán, with semi-limited populations. Its natural habitat is made up of pine-oak forests, with dry-thick brush scattered throughout at elevations of around 1,060 to 3,000 m (3,480 to 9,840 ft).

== Diet ==
Salle's quail primarily feeds upon bulbs and tubers during the dry season, and invertebrates during the wet season, with access to standing water not necessary in its diet.

== Conservation ==
Salle's quail is currently listed as "Near Threatened" by the IUCN Red List, for agriculture, hunting, poaching, and deforestation are becoming more potent threats. An average individual's lifespan is 1.9 years in the wild, with longer lifespans in captivity. Its populations are decreasing at a semi-fast rate.
