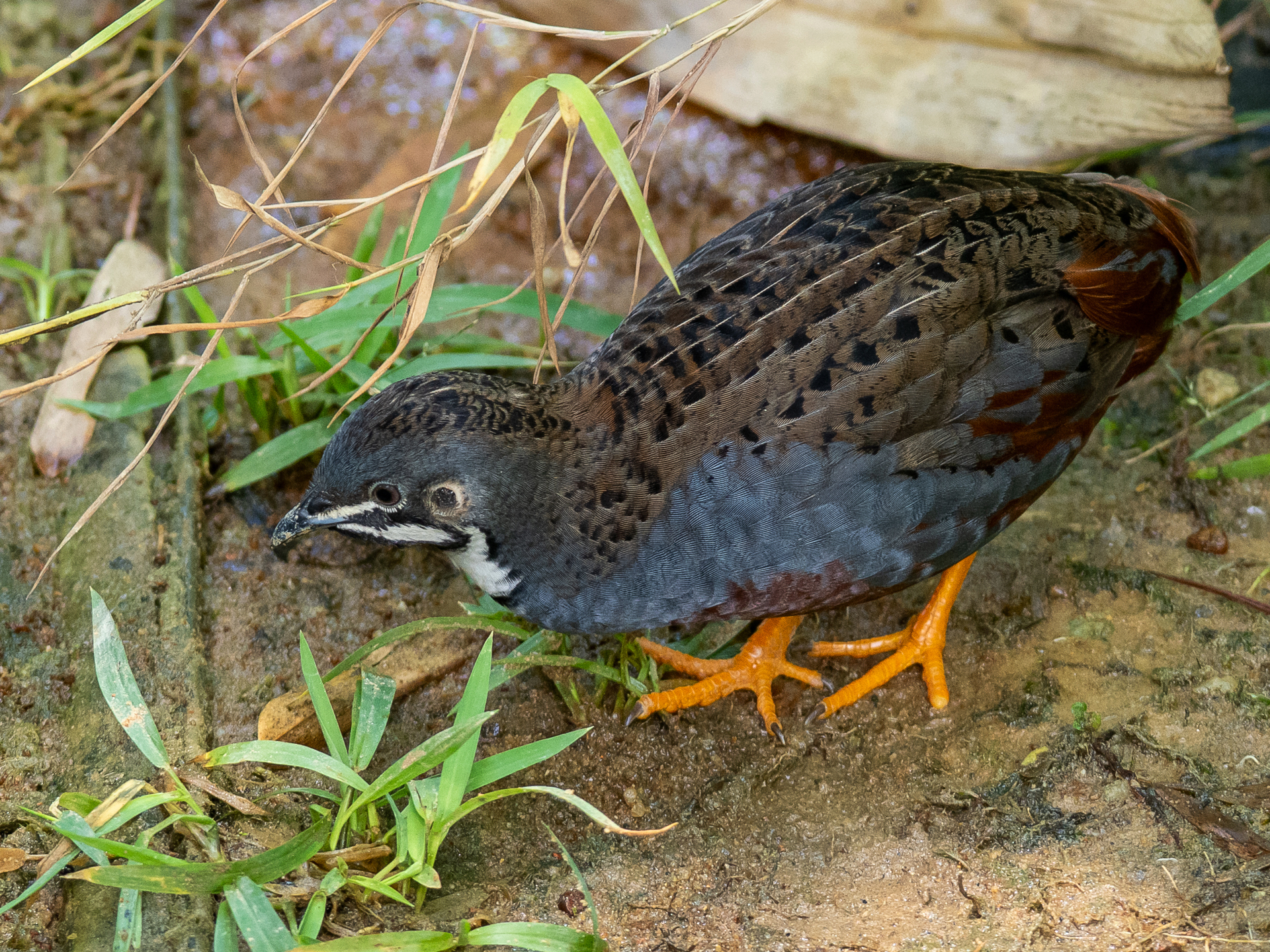
- S. c. chinensis, Singapore

Conservation status
- Least Concern (IUCN 3.1)

Scientific classification
- Kingdom: Animalia
- Phylum: Chordata
- Class: Aves
- Order: Galliformes
- Family: Phasianidae
- Genus: Synoicus
- Species: S. chinensis

Binomial name
- Synoicus chinensis (Linnaeus, 1766)
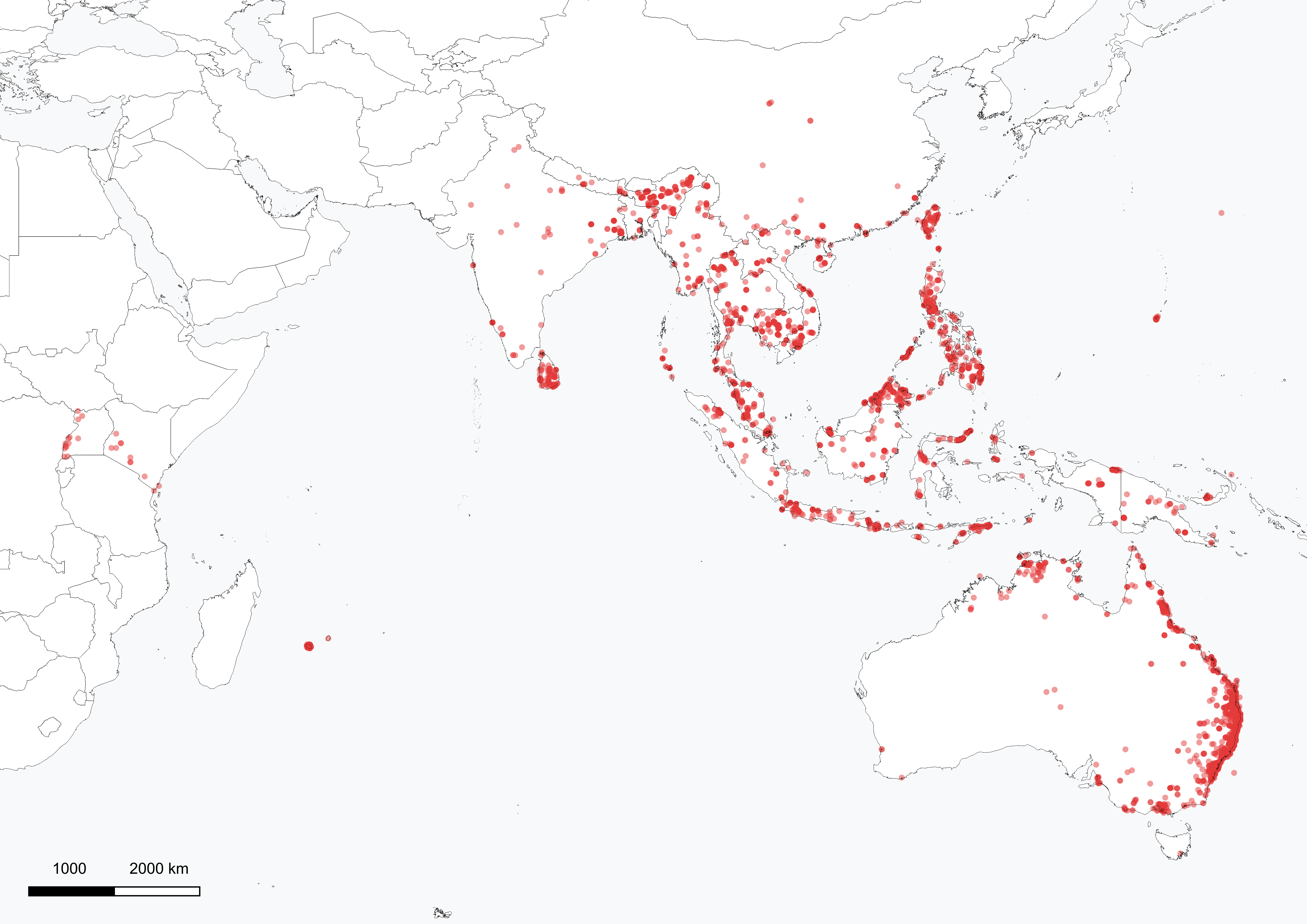
- Species distribution

Synonyms
- Tetrao chinensis Linnaeus, 1766 (protonym); Coturnix chinensis; Excalfactoria chinensis

= King quail =

Species of bird

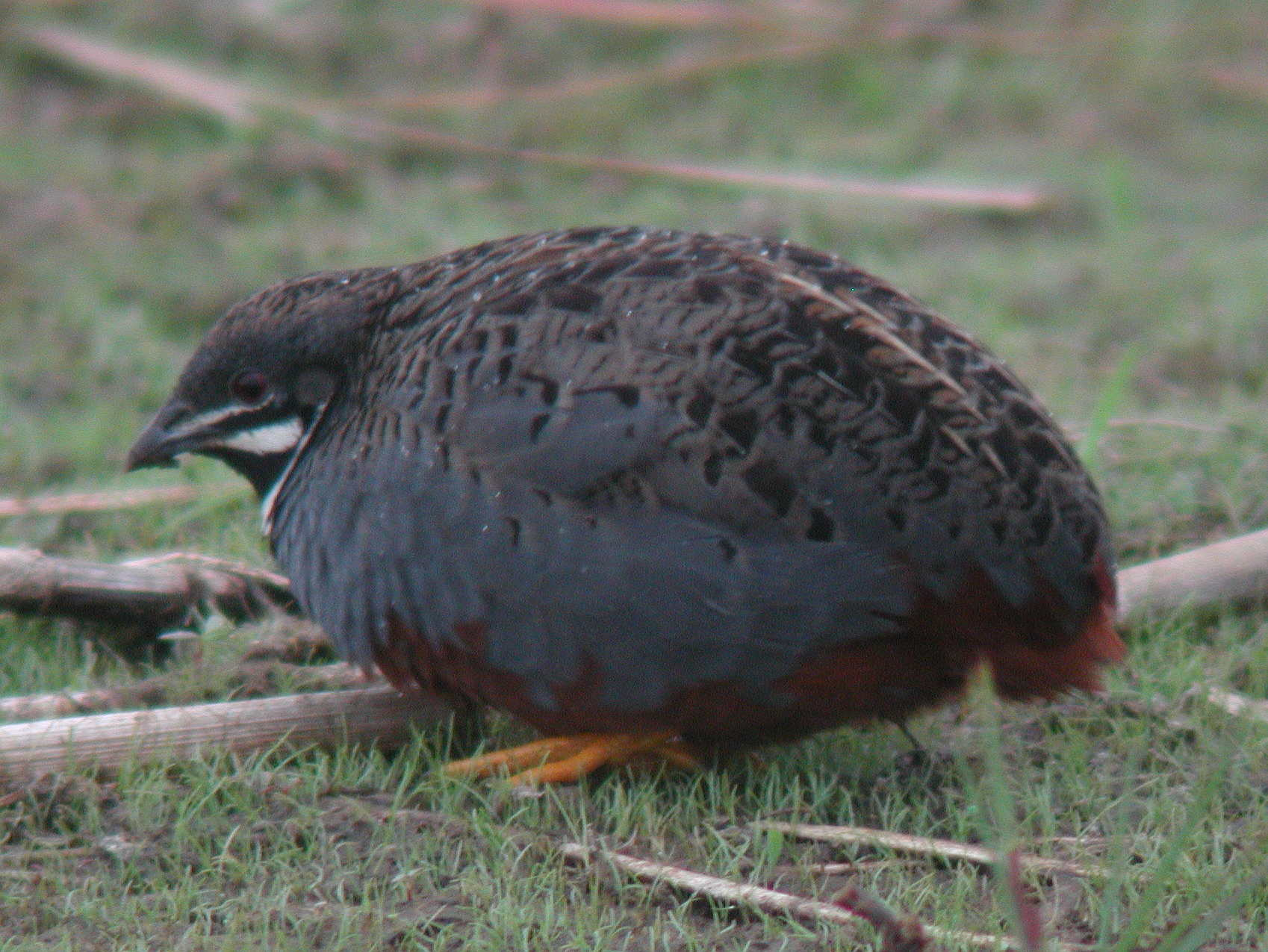
S. c. victoriae, Samsonvale, SE Queensland

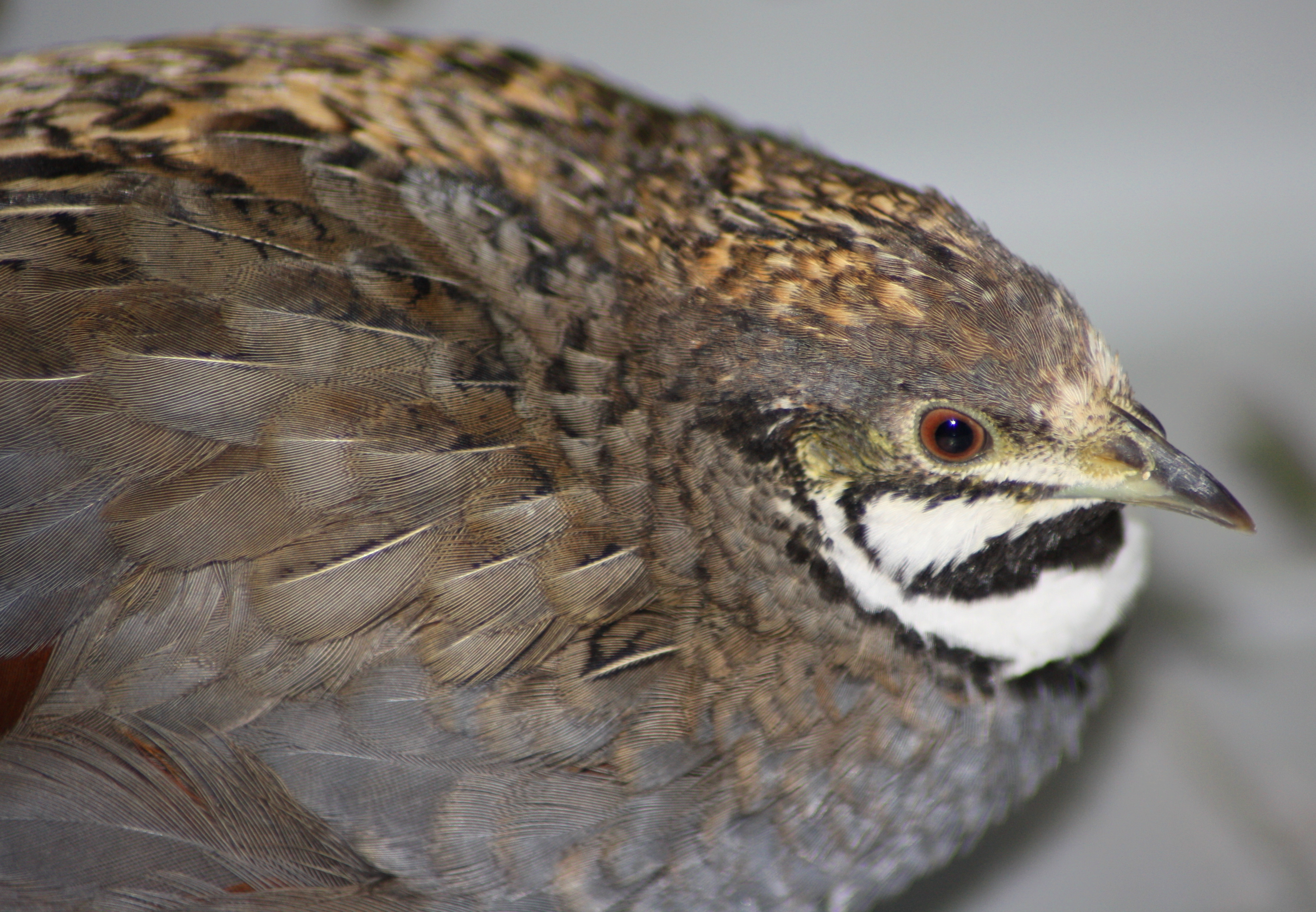
Captive king quail, male

The king quail (Synoicus chinensis), also known as the Asian blue quail, blue-breasted quail, Chinese painted quail, button quail, or Chung-Chi, is a very small, diminutive galliform of the tribe Coturnicini in the subfamily Phasianinae. They are the smallest member in this subfamily and the family Phasianidae, as well as being the smallest and lightest member of the order Galliformes. It is quite common in aviculture worldwide, where it is sometimes referred to as the "button quail", although it is not closely related to the family of birds called buttonquails. Its voice is a piping whistle, ti-yu or ti-ti-yu. It also gives sharp cheeps or a tir-tir-tir sound when flushed.

== Description ==
King quail is 12–15 cm long, with a wingspan of about 25 cm long, and weighing 20–57 g. Males are distinctive, with a dark brown back and wings, dark blue-grey flanks and neck, and dark red-brown underparts; the face is patterned with a black chin with a white band just below on the upper throat, and black and white stripes below the eyes. Females are much plainer rufous-brown all over except for a paler belly.

== Distribution and taxonomy ==
They range in the wild from southern China, South and Southeast Asia to Oceania, south to southeastern Australia.

Six subspecies are currently accepted:

- S. c. chinensis (Linnaeus, 1766): India and Sri Lanka to Malaya, Indochina, southeastern China, and Taiwan
- S. c. trinkutensis Richmond, 1902: Nicobar blue-breasted quail, on the Nicobar Islands
- S. c. lineatus (Scopoli, 1786): Philippines, Borneo, Lesser Sundas, Sulawesi and Sula Islands
- S. c. lepidus (Hartlaub, 1879): New Guinea and the Bismarck Archipelago
- S. c. victoriae (Mathews, 1912): eastern Australia (Queensland to Victoria)
- S. c. colletti (Mathews, 1912): northern Australia (Northern Territory)

A further four subspecies have been accepted by some authors, with S. c. palmeri separated from S. c. chinensis in Sumatra and Java, S. c. lineatulus from S. c. lineatus on the Lesser Sundas, and S. c. novaeguineae and S. c. papuensis from S. c. lepidus in New Guinea.

The species has had a complex taxonomic history, being classified into the genus Coturnix, then Synoicus, then Excalfactoria before being returned to Synoicus. Phylogenetic evidence supports it belonging in an expanded Synoicus that, alongside the blue quail (S. adansonii) also includes the Snow Mountain quail (S. monorthonyx) and brown quail (S. ypsilophorus).

When treated in the genus Excalfactoria, the subspecies Synoicus chinensis victoriae becomes Excalfactoria chinensis australis (Gould, 1865), an older name but which is preoccupied by the Australian subspecies of the brown quail (S. y. australis Latham, 1801); the reclassification of the species into Synoicus led to the epithet being changed to S. c. victoriae (Mathews, 1912).

== Reproduction ==
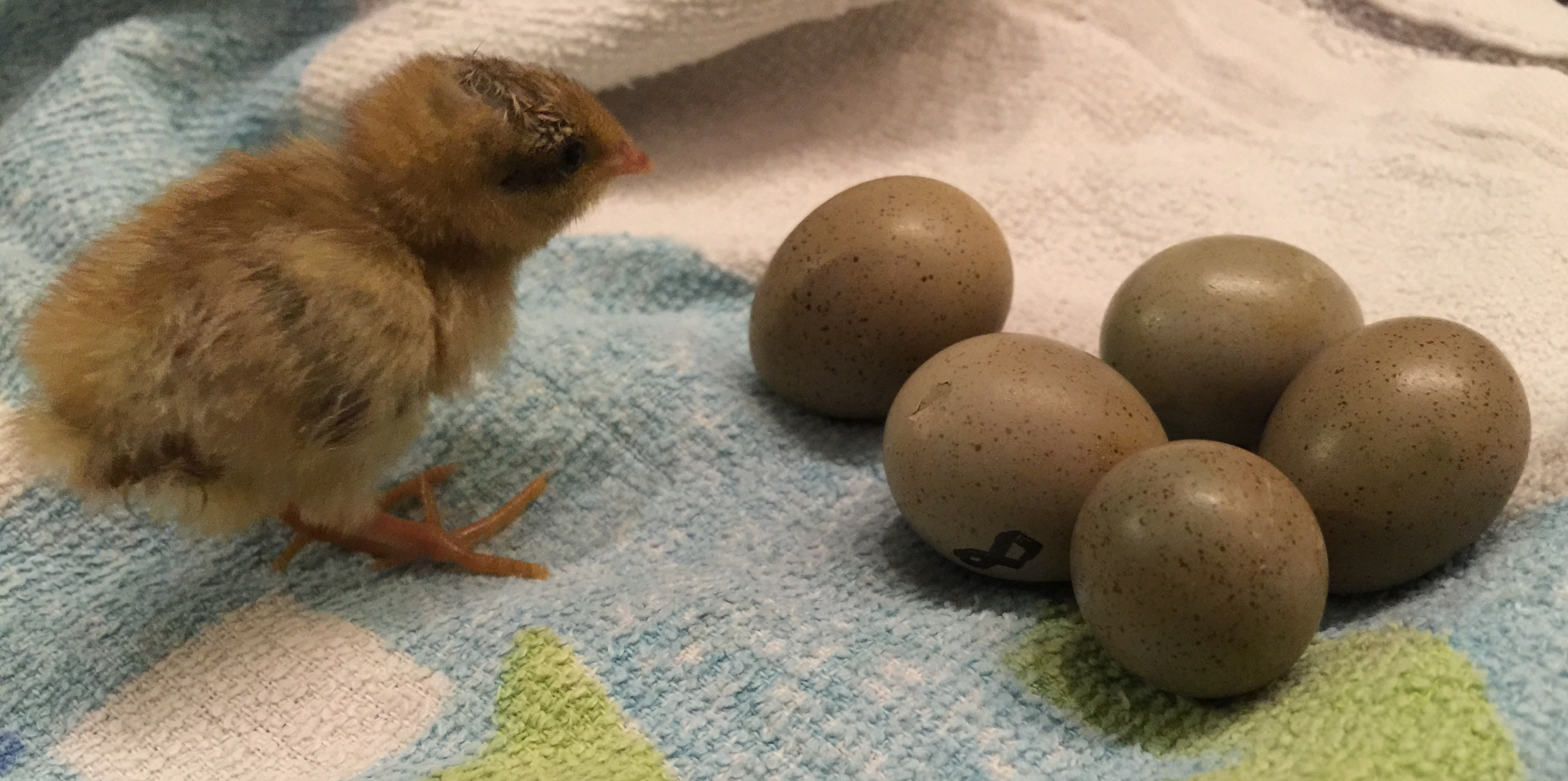
King quail eggs and 10-day-old chick

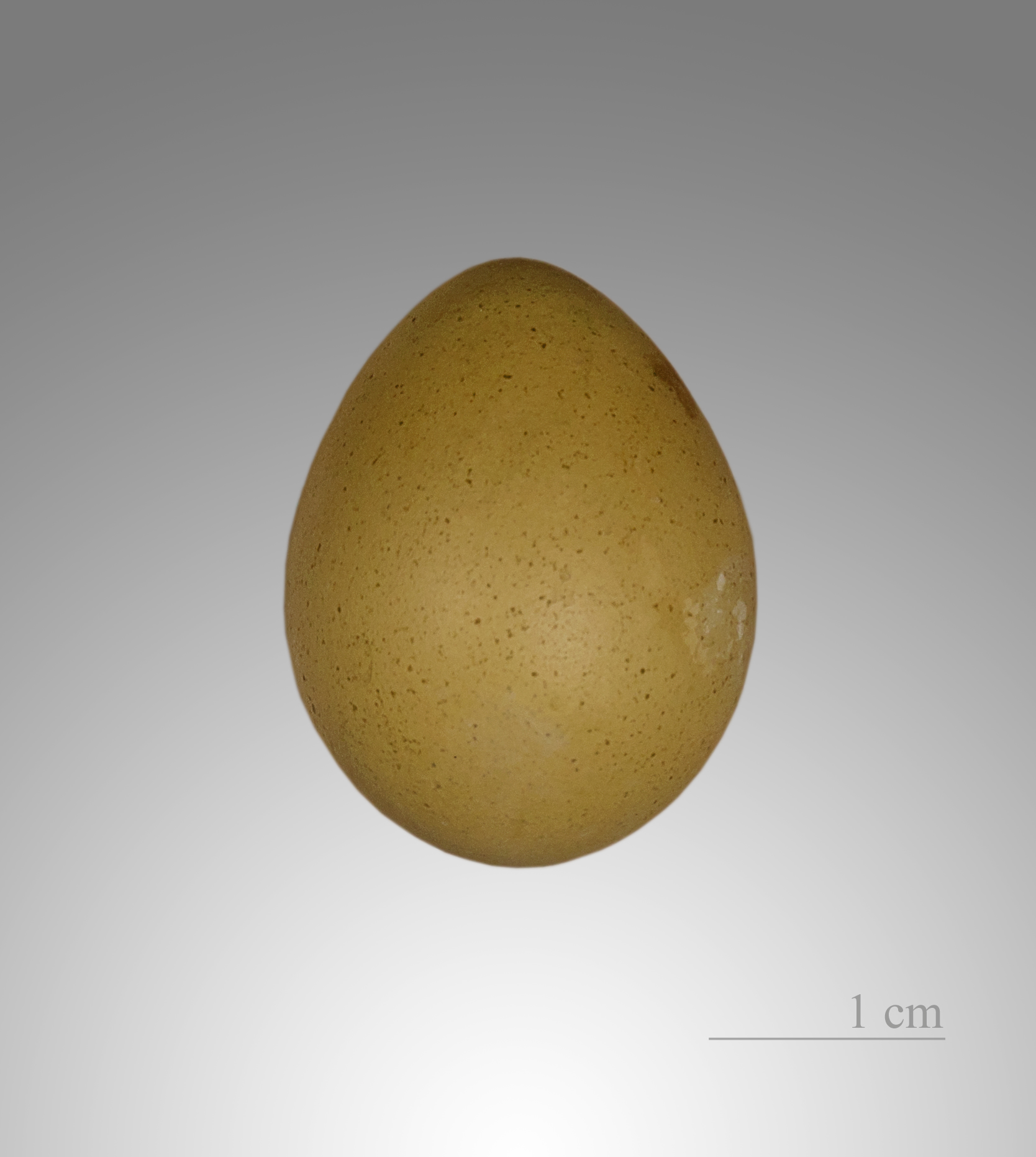
Egg at the Muséum de Toulouse, France

The natural breeding system is not known; however birds raised in captivity are reported to be monogamous. The nest is on the ground, lined with dry grass. Clutch size varies from 4–7 (rarely 9) eggs; incubation lasts for 16–18 days. The chicks can fly after one month, and reach sexual maturity in 3 months.

== Conservation status ==
=== Australia ===
King quail are not listed as threatened on the Australian Environment Protection and Biodiversity Conservation Act 1999.

==== State of Victoria, Australia ====
This species is listed as threatened on the Victorian Flora and Fauna Guarantee Act (1988). Under this Act, an Action Statement for the recovery and future management of this species has not been prepared.

On the 2007 advisory list of threatened vertebrate fauna in Victoria, this species is listed as endangered.

== Diet ==
The diet of king quail consists of grass seeds, rape seeds, and green vegetation; they also eat some insects, particularly termites.

== In captivity ==
In captivity, male king quail occur in many colour mutations, including Wild Type, Golden Pearl, Red-breasted, Blueface, Silver, White, Cinnamon, and Fallow. They have orange feet that are hard and able to withstand a continuous life on the ground like many other game birds. Females are similar to the males, but do not occur in shades of blue. They can live up to 13 years in captivity but typically only 3–6 years. In the wild, they may live only 1.5 years. The eggs of king quail are a light, creamy-brown colour and slightly pointed at the "top", roughly ovular in shape. Male quail give a descending whistle and a raspy "snoring" call.

A failed attempt was made to introduce this species to New Zealand by the Otago Acclimatisation Society in the late 1890s.

=== Aviculture ===
This quail has been very popular to keep and breed for many years; numerous mutations have been developed. They are quite hardy once they have adjusted to their surroundings and keep the bottom of an aviary spotless. A great advantage of these quail is that they live exclusively on the ground, and do not interfere with other birds. The cost of purchasing and maintaining them is very little. They have been known to become hand-tame.

They may be housed in pairs to quartets in a planted aviary, kept singly in bird cages, or in colonies in large flights. Males may compete, as may females. Suspension cages do not work well for this species of quail because of their smaller feet; a much finer size of floor wire should be employed.

Females lay an egg a day if kept on the proper diet. Nesting sites can be as spartan as a quiet corner or a depression in the ground against a wall. Preferably, a clump of long grass, tea tree branches, or pile of loose herbage should be provided. Often, a hen lays eggs on the aviary floor without the use of a nest. This is a sign that the birds are not content with the existing facilities and the provision of a sheltered nest site may result in a nest being built. The cock usually selects the nest site. The nest is a simple scrape in the ground, lined with grasses, and is built by the hen with some assistance from the cock. The eggs measuring 25 x 19mm are variable in colour from the palest of browns to dark olive and peppered with fine black spots. Clutch size varies from four to 13, but occasionally a hen can be found incubating upwards of 20 eggs. It is usually a combined clutch from a number of hens, and due to the difficulties of turning and covering a clutch of that size, hatching rate is often poor. Removing some of the eggs and artificially incubating or fostering them may be beneficial.

The species usually breeds year-round; incubation times are from 18 to 23 days before chicks hatch. The hen cares for the chicks until around 4 weeks of age, when they should be separated from parent birds into a separate aviary.

In aviculture, all birds should be fed a variety of seeds and a healthy range of fruit and vegetables. During breeding, hens should be fed calcium-rich food sources such as shell grit to prevent egg binding. Newly hatched chicks should be fed high-protein chick crumb mixed with a little water. Other sources of protein include mealworms, termites and various insects.

=== Mutations ===
Silvers and cinnamon are the most common color varieties. Pied,white, and spalsh are becoming more common. Most mutations can be combined.

Occasionally, cock-feathered hens appear; this is not a mutation as such, but one of a few conditions that affect normal hormonal balances. It is most often seen when a hen has an ovarian cyst or growth. They usually stop laying eggs, but can live for a number of years happily just looking like a male. In one case, a silver hen was kept for many years by herself, moulted into cock plumage, and laid only extremely pale, green-shelled eggs for a few seasons before passing of old age.

=== Hybrids ===
Hybrids of king quail and brown quail are known.
