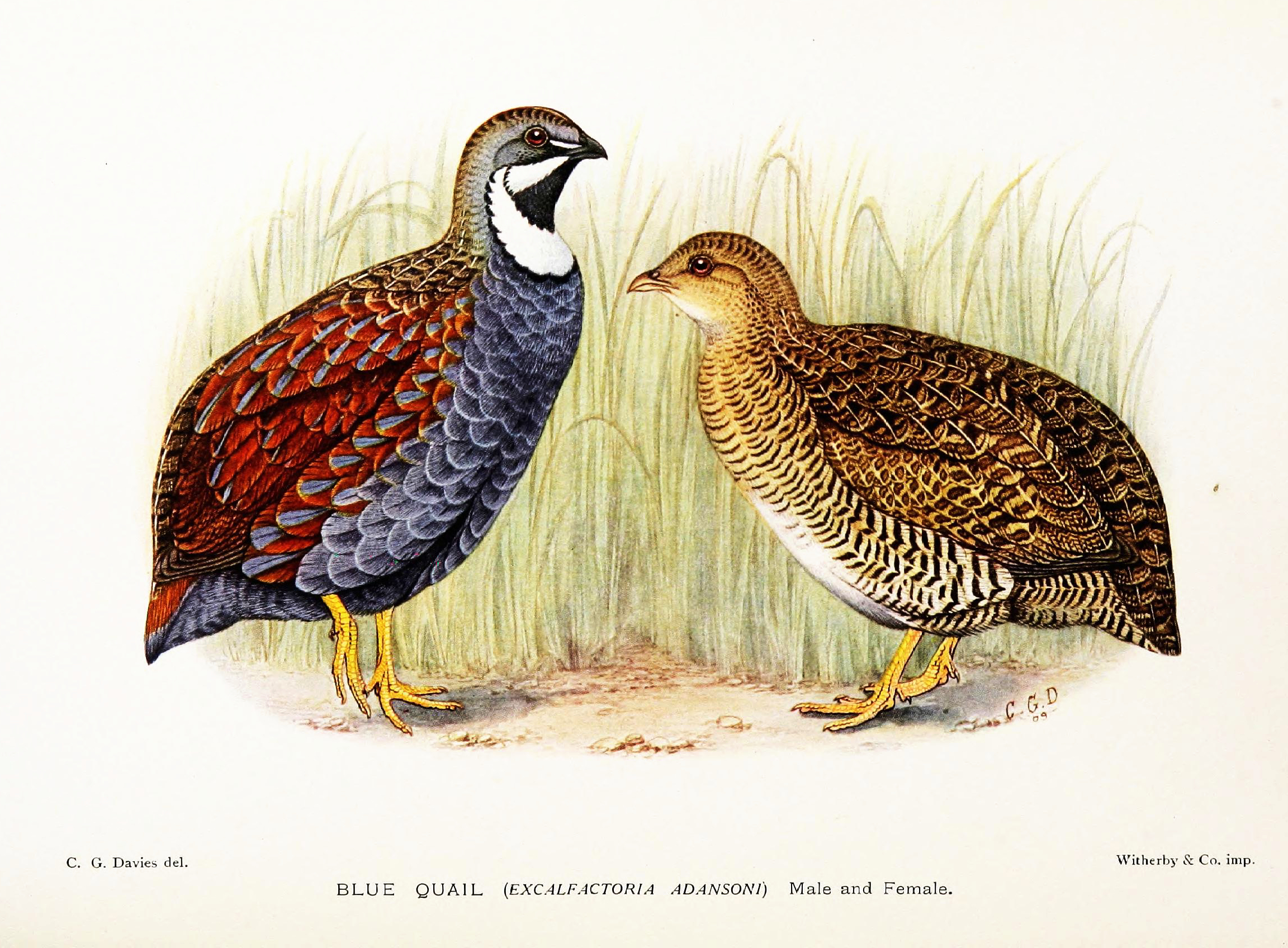

Conservation status
- Least Concern (IUCN 3.1)

Scientific classification
- Kingdom: Animalia
- Phylum: Chordata
- Class: Aves
- Order: Galliformes
- Family: Phasianidae
- Genus: Synoicus
- Species: S. adansonii

Binomial name
- Synoicus adansonii (Verreaux & Verreaux, 1851)

Synonyms
- Excalfactoria adansonii; Coturnix adansonii; Coturnix adansoni

= Blue quail =

Species of bird

The blue quail or African blue quail (Synoicus adansonii) is a species of bird in the family Phasianidae found in sub-Saharan Africa.

== Taxonomy ==
The blue quail was described as Coturnix adansonii by Jules Verreaux and Édouard Verreaux in 1851. It is named after the French naturalist Michel Adanson. The species has had a complex taxonomic history, being classified into the genus Coturnix, then Synoicus, then Excalfactoria. Phylogenetic evidence supports it belonging in an expanded Synoicus that, alongside the king quail (S. chinensis) also includes the Snow Mountains quail (S. monorthonyx) and brown quail (S. ypsilophorus). The IOC World Bird List and Handbook of the Birds of the World now both place it in Synoicus. Sometimes considered a subspecies of the king quail, the species is monotypic.

== Distribution and habitat ==
The species is found in sub-Saharan Africa. It ranges from Sierra Leone to Ethiopia, and south to Zambia, and eastward to Kenya. The habitat of the blue quail excludes dry areas. Inhabiting mainly grassland and fields, the birds typically live near rivers or other bodies of water.

== Description ==
The blue quail is 14–16.5 cm (5.5–6.5 in) long and weighs 43–44 g (1.5–1.6 oz). Its legs are yellow. The colour of the eyes varies from brown in the juvenile to red in the breeding male. The species is sexually dimorphic. The male's plumage is mostly dark slaty-blue, with rufous patches on its wings. The male has a black beak, a brown head, and a black and white throat. There is a white patch on its breast. Its flight feathers are brown. The forehead, sides of the head and neck, and flanks of the female are orange-buff. Its crown is brown, with black mottles. The female's beak is brownish. Its underparts are buff, with black bars, and its upperparts have black and rufous mottles and streaks. The juvenile is similar to the female.

== Behaviour ==
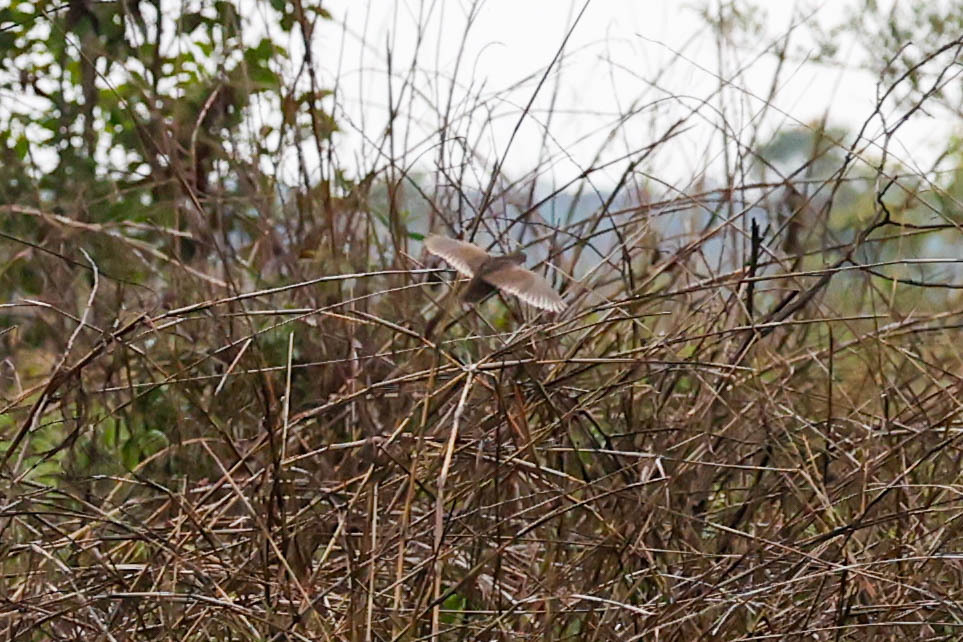
Female in flight

The blue quail is migratory, changing regions at the start of the rainy season and again early in the dry season. It eats seeds, leaves, insects, and molluscs. Its voice is a piping whistle, kew kew yew. It also gives the whistle tir-tir-tir when it is flushed. The blue quail is monogamous. The nest is a scrape. Eggs are usually laid at the beginning of the rainy season. Three to 9 olive-brown eggs are laid in a clutch. The eggs have reddish and purplish freckles. They are incubated by the female for around 16 days. The chicks are precocial.

== Status ==
The blue quail has a large range and appears to have a stable population trend. The IUCN Red List of Threatened Species has listed the species as least concern.
