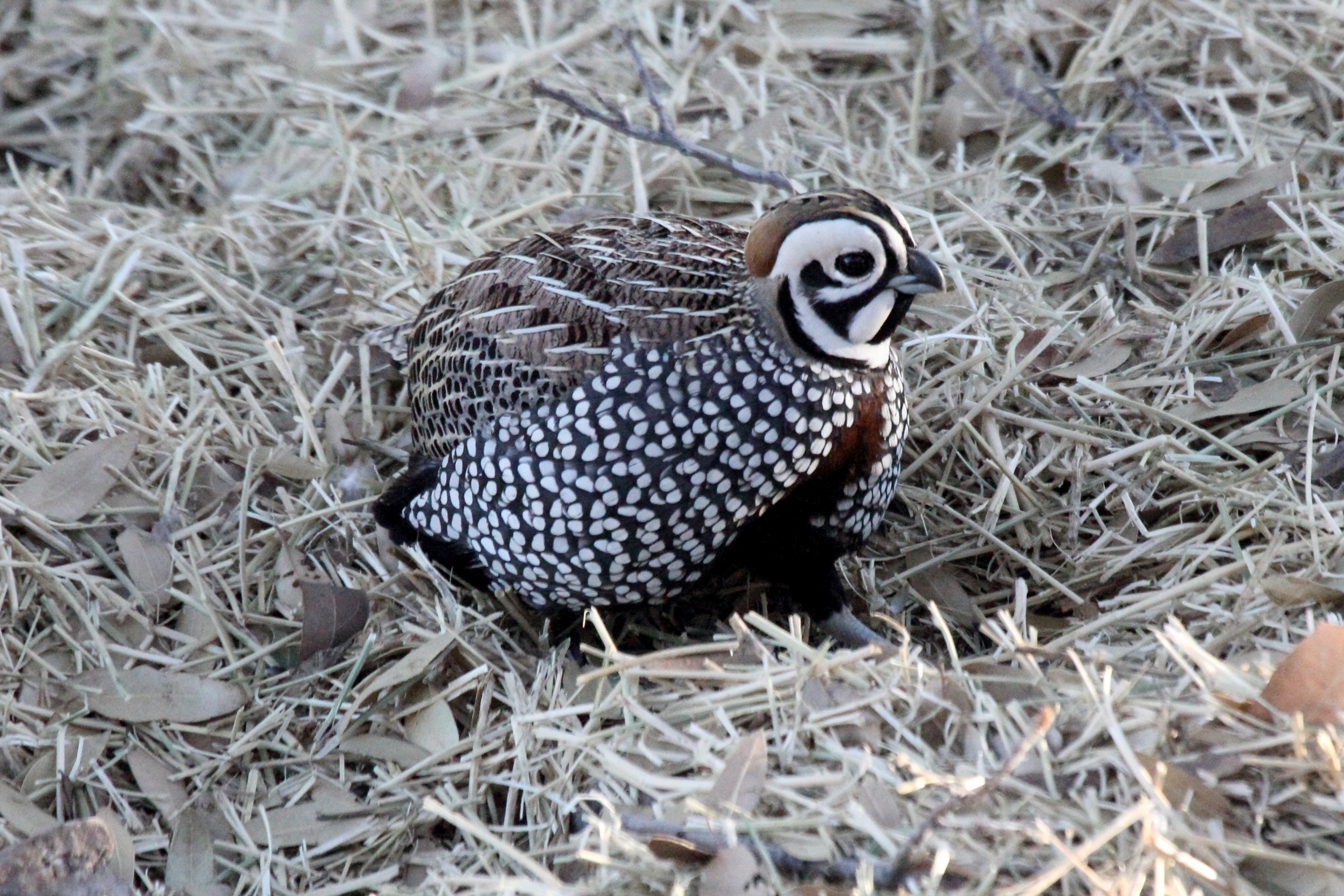

Conservation status
- Least Concern (IUCN 3.1)

- Apparently Secure (NatureServe)

Scientific classification
- Kingdom: Animalia
- Phylum: Chordata
- Class: Aves
- Order: Galliformes
- Family: Odontophoridae
- Genus: Cyrtonyx
- Species: C. montezumae

Binomial name
- Cyrtonyx montezumae (Vigors, 1830)

= Montezuma quail =

Species of bird

The Montezuma quail (Cyrtonyx montezumae) is a stubby, secretive New World quail of Mexico and some nearby parts of the United States. It is also known as Mearns's quail, the harlequin quail (for the male's striking pattern), and the fool quail (for its behavior).

== Taxonomy ==
The Montezuma quail was formally described in 1830 by Irish zoologist Nicholas Aylward Vigors under the binomial name Ortyx montezumae based on a specimen collected in Mexico. This species is now placed in the genus Cyrtonyx that was introduced in 1844 by English ornithologist John Gould, with Montezuma quail as the type species. The specific epithet montezumae is from the name of the Aztec Emperor Moctezuma Xocoyotzin.

The southern populations are sometimes considered a separate species, Cyrtonyx sallei. The Montezuma quail, though, is sometimes considered conspecific with the very similar ocellated quail, Cyrtonyx ocellatus, which replaces it from the Isthmus of Tehuantepec to northern Nicaragua.

=== Subspecies ===
The two recognized subspecies are:

- C. m. mearnsi Nelson, 1900 – southwest United States and northern Mexico
- C. m. montezumae (Vigors, 1830) – nominate – central Mexico (includes C. m. merriami, which is of doubtful validity)

Former subspecies Cyrtonyx montezumae sallei (Salle's quail or the spot-breasted quail) was recently elevated to full species status by the IUCN Red List under BirdLife International, along with other sources, based on plumage differences. Cyrtonyx montezumae rowleyi (Rowley's quail) was subsumed into Salle's quail, as it was previously a part of the southern group of the Montezuma quail, including the prior.

== Description ==
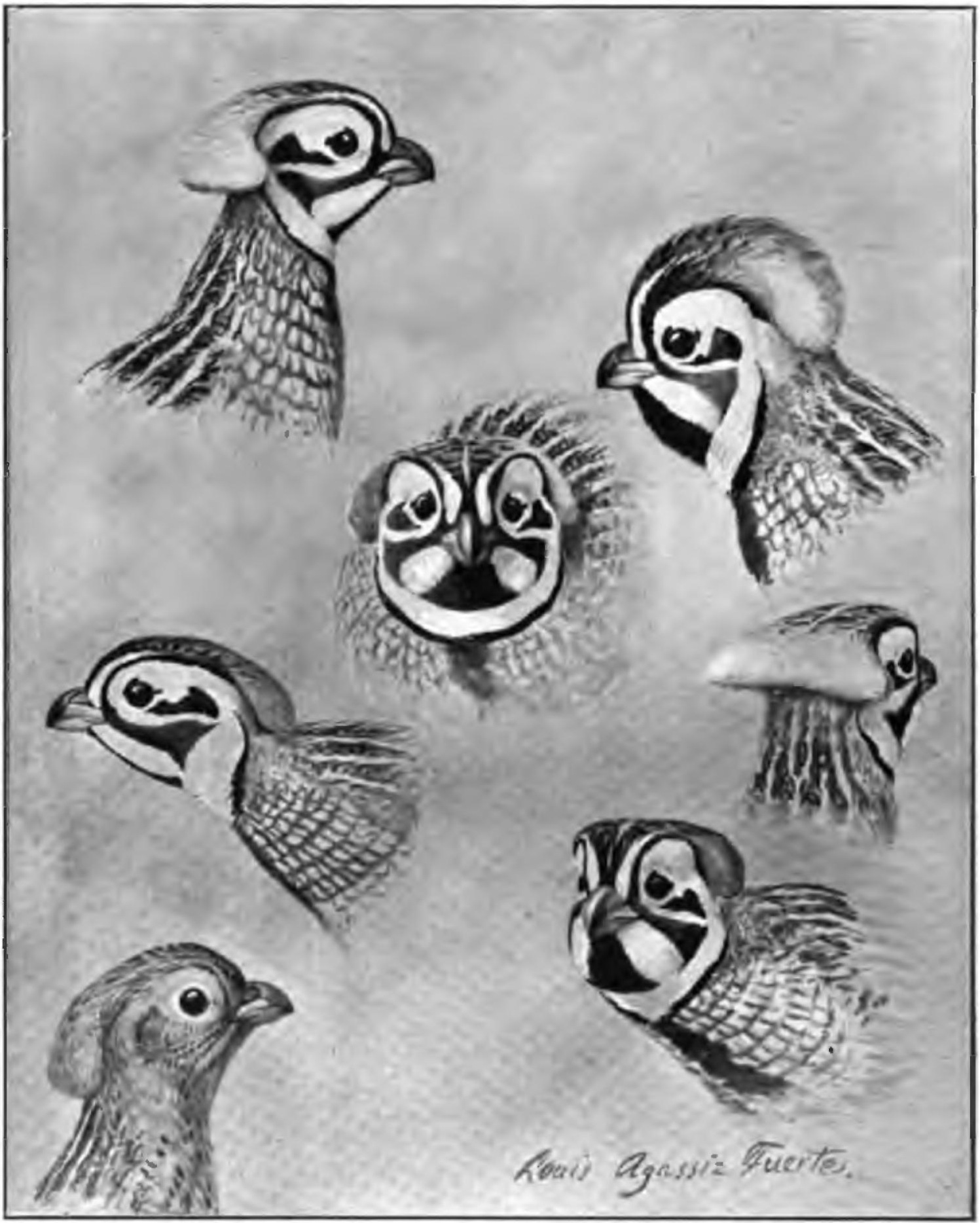
Illustration of crest by Louis Agassiz Fuertes

At about 22 cm (8.75 in), it is one of the shortest quails of North America, although it weighs 122–230 g (4.3–8.1 oz), the same as some Callipepla quails that are somewhat taller. It has an even plumper build and shorter tail than other quails. The bird has a length of 20–23 cm (7.9–9.1 in) and wingspan of 41–43 cm (16–17 in).

Both sexes have the back and wing coverts tan with longitudinal light-buff streaks formed by the feather shafts and circular or transversely oblong black spots arranged in bars. A crest on the nape makes the profile distinctively long front-to-back. The bill is black above and bluish-gray below. The adult males have a striking, swirling black-and-white face pattern. A single tan plume lies flat over the crest. Their sides are blue-gray (often looking black) with bold spots, which in northern birds are white and in southern birds are white towards the front and chestnut towards the back. The middle of the chest and belly is dark brown in northern birds, lighter and tawnier in southern birds. Females have a suggestion of the male's face pattern. Their underparts are light brown with a few fine black shaft streaks and other lines. Juveniles resemble females, but the underparts are grayish with white shaft streaks and black dots. Immature males develop the adult side pattern early, but do not develop the face pattern till early winter.

An unusual feature of this species is its long, sickle-shaped claws, which it uses for digging.

=== Voice ===
The assembly or territorial call is "six to nine notes descending in pitch", "a far-carrying, descending, quavering whinny". The male's "song" for pairing is "an eerie, melancholy, vibrant, descending whistle vwirrrrr" or "an insect-like buzzing that starts at a high pitch and descends". It is given from the ground, whereas other quails sing on such perches as the tops of fenceposts or bushes. Other calls are used, as well.

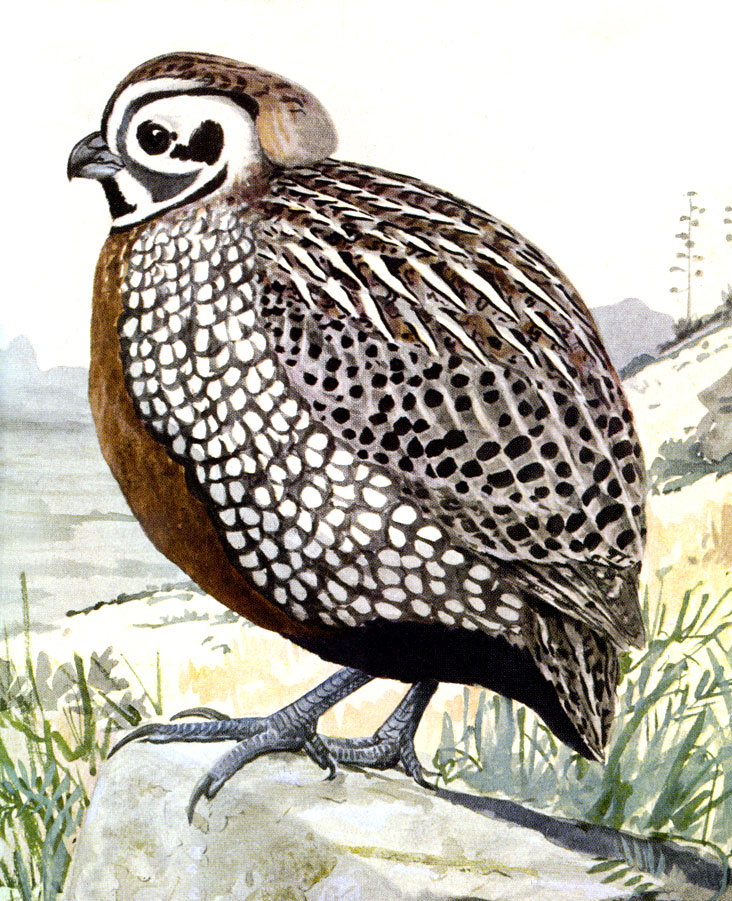
Adult male (illustration)

== Range and habitat ==
This species can be found from Oaxaca north through the interior of Mexico to the mountains of central and southeastern Arizona, central and southwestern New Mexico, and West Texas. It is absent from deserts and the Río Balsas valley. There are five subspecies divided into two plumage types, northern and southern, that intergrade in central Veracruz.

Their habitat is open woods, most often oak, but also pine-oak and juniper, with grass at least 30 cm (1 ft) tall. Slopes of hills and canyons are particularly favored. Their range is decreasing and becoming fragmented.

== Behavior ==
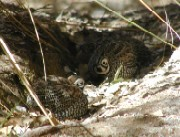
Males at Coronado National Memorial

In fall, Montezuma quail do not form large groups, as most American quail do. An average covey consists of eight birds, just parents and their offspring, although coveys bigger than 25 birds have been reported. At night, birds in a covey roost on southeast-facing slopes, gathered around a rock or tussock, facing outward.

These birds are quite sedentary. A pair or covey typically forages within 50 m of the place where it foraged the day before. Coveys' territories in fall and winter are only 1 to 5 ha; in the breeding season, pairs spread out and territories may be as big as 50 ha. Otherwise, no seasonal movements are known.

In the presence of humans, Montezuma quail crouch motionless in tall grass instead of running. They may allow an approach as close as 1 m before flying (taking off with a "loud, popping wing noise") and on rare occasions have been caught by hand.

=== Breeding ===
Males begin singing in February or March, but nesting does not start till July or August, the season of "monsoon" rains throughout its range. The long delay between pairing and nesting is unusual for quails. The nest is also unusual—a grass dome with one entrance, more elaborate than most nests in the family. The clutch comprises about 11 eggs (ranging from 2 to 15), which are "whitish" or "chalk-white". Incubation lasts about 25 days by both the male and the female (2 days longer than that of most American quails). Males help brood the young; at least in captive birds, they may also help build the nest and incubate the eggs. Young are born covered in down and can follow their mother.

=== Feeding ===
The Montezuma quail eats insects, especially in summer, as well as plants. Particularly important plant foods are Oxalis and other bulbs, as well as sedge (Cyperus esculentus and C. sphaerolepis) tubers, which it digs up. The holes, often at the bases of bushes and rocks, may be as much as 8 cm (3.1 in) deep and are a good sign of the bird's presence. Crops sometimes contain bulbs of plants that have no above-ground growth at that season; how the birds find such bulbs is unknown.

== Interactions with humans ==
Like most birds of its order, the Montezuma quail is a popular game bird. Regulated hunting does not seem to affect populations much in the United States, but it may have a greater effect in Mexico. A greater threat appears to be cattle grazing, not because of competition for food, but because it depletes the cover in which the quail hide. Grazing is particularly harmful in years of low summer rains, but some grazing regimens may not harm quail populations.
