= Rowley's quail =

Conservation status
- Near Threatened (IUCN 3.1)

Scientific classification
- Kingdom: Animalia
- Phylum: Chordata
- Class: Aves
- Order: Galliformes
- Family: Odontophoridae
- Genus: Cyrtonyx
- Species: C. sallei
- Subspecies: C. s. rowleyi

Trinomial name
- Cyrtonyx sallei rowleyi Phillips, 1966

Synonyms
- • Cyrtonyx montezumae rowleyi A.R. Phillips

Subspecies of bird

Rowley's quail (Cyrtonyx sallei rowleyi), also known as the southern Salle's quail, Sierra de Miahuatlán quail, or the Sierra de Miahuatlán Salle's quail is a subspecies of Salle's quail that is endemic to the Sierra de Miahuatlán of Oaxaca and Guerrero, Mexico.

== Taxonomy ==
Rowley's quail was originally listed under Cyrtonyx montezumae (Montezuma quail), with Cyrtonyx montezumae sallei (now Cyrtonyx sallei) having very similar traits, for both subspecies were of a southern type. Cyrtonyx montezumae sallei then became Cyrtonyx sallei (Salle's quail), with Rowley's quail becoming a subspecies of Salle's quail (which did not have the necessary requirements to be an actual species).

== Distribution ==
Rowley's quail is native to the Sierra de Miahuatlán (smaller-sized mountain range) within Oaxaca and Guerrero, Mexico, with some scattered individuals present in other nearby areas. Its range is made up of high-mountainous grasslands, and pine-oak forests, at upward elevations of 1,060-3,000 m in some parts of the mountain range.

== Threats ==
Rowley's quail is under threat of deforestation, wildfires, poaching, and agricultural land clearance in its natural range. Other semi-common threats may include hunting and/or habitat destruction.
