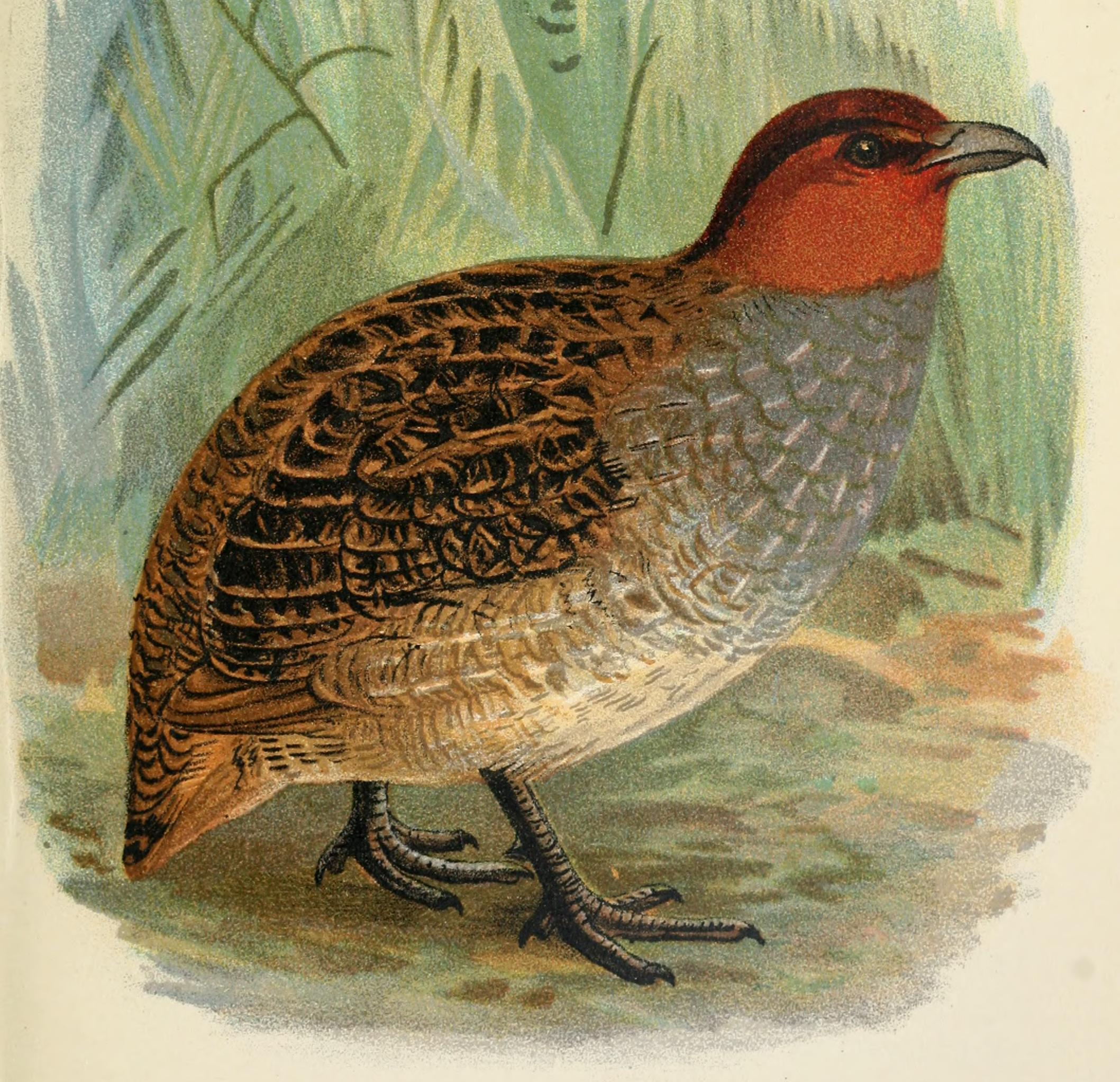

Conservation status
- Data Deficient (IUCN 3.1)

Scientific classification
- Kingdom: Animalia
- Phylum: Chordata
- Class: Aves
- Order: Galliformes
- Family: Phasianidae
- Genus: Rhizothera
- Species: R. dulitensis

Binomial name
- Rhizothera dulitensis Ogilvie-Grant, 1895

Synonyms
- Rhizothera longirostris dulitensis

= Dulit partridge =

Species of bird

The Dulit partridge (Rhizothera dulitensis), also known as Hose's partridge, is a bird in the Phasianidae, or pheasant, family. It is endemic to Borneo, where it appears to be separated altitudinally from the closely related long-billed partridge R. longirostris. It was formerly considered to be a distinctive subspecies of the long-billed partridge, but is now treated as a distinct species, Rhizothera dulitensis. It is little-known, rare, and has not been recorded since 1902; a claim that it was sighted in 1937 is likely not true.

== Description ==
The partridge is 30 cm in length. Like the long-billed partridge, it is mainly rufous-buff in colour, with a lavender-grey breast-band, a long, black, curved bill and yellow legs. It differs from the long-billed partridge in that the grey breast band is twice as wide, and the underparts are whitish-buff rather than bright orange-buff.

== Distribution and habitat ==
The partridge is confined to lower montane forest on the mountains of Borneo. It was first recorded from Mount Dulit and later found on Mount Murud and Mount Batu Song, all in northern Sarawak. Two specimens were collected by Everett on Mount Kinabalu in Sabah in 1895, but it has not been recorded from that state since.

== Status and conservation ==
Orenstein et al. (2010) suggest that the partridge may be seriously threatened by habitat degradation and hunting, and that an important conservation priority is its rediscovery. BirdLife International considers that it may have been in rapid decline because of habitat destruction and degradation, and that its taxonomic status should be investigated.
