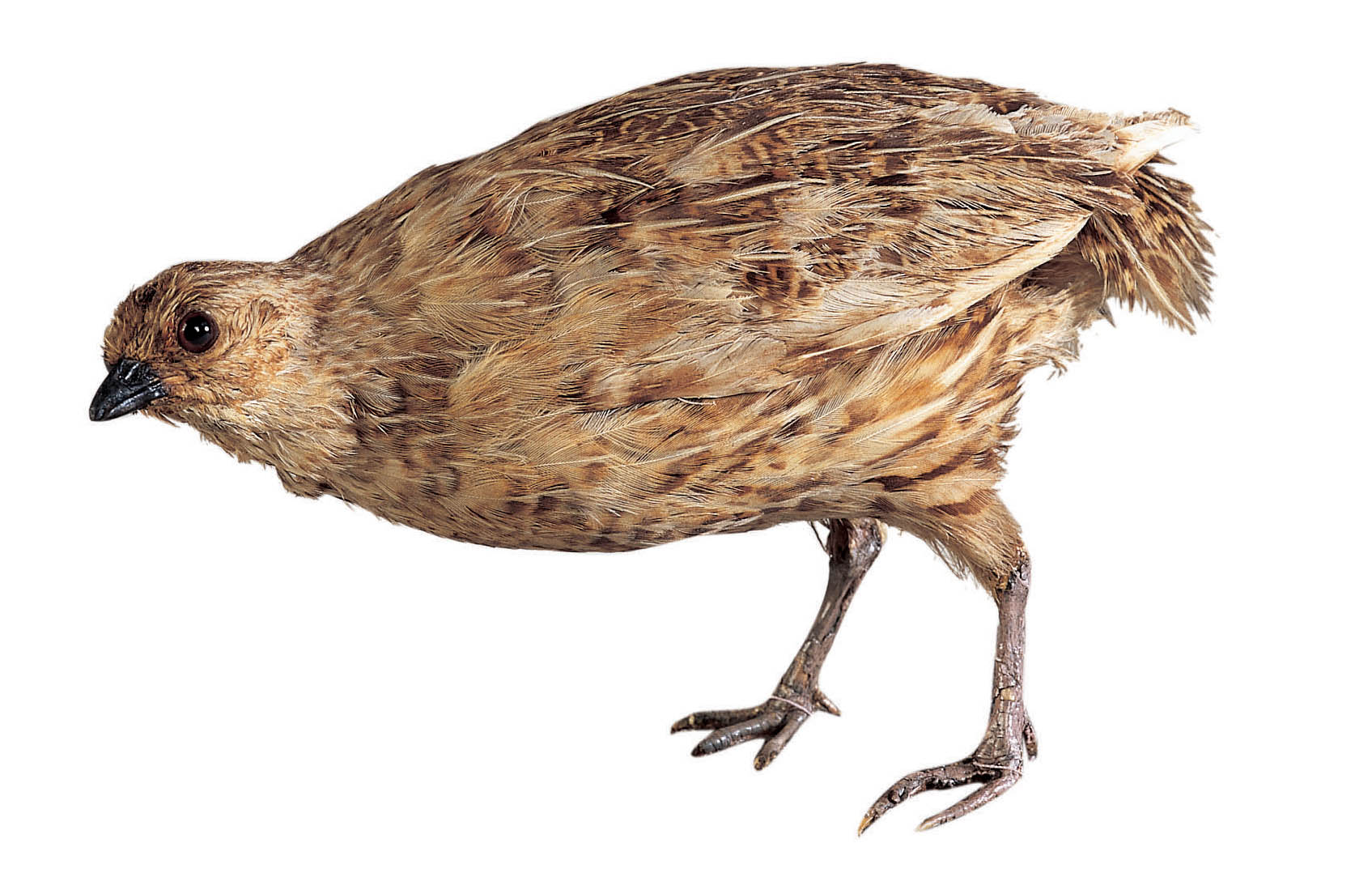
- Specimen in Auckland War Memorial Museum Tāmaki Paenga Hira

Conservation status
- Extinct (1875) (IUCN 3.1)

- Extinct (1875) (NZ TCS)

Scientific classification
- Kingdom: Animalia
- Phylum: Chordata
- Class: Aves
- Order: Galliformes
- Family: Phasianidae
- Genus: Coturnix
- Species: †C. novaezelandiae

Binomial name
- †Coturnix novaezelandiae Quoy & Gaimard, 1832

Synonyms
- Coturnix novaezelandiae novaezelandiae Quoy & Gaimard, 1830

= New Zealand quail =

Extinct species of bird

The New Zealand quail (Coturnix novaezelandiae), or koreke in Māori, is an extinct quail species endemic to New Zealand. The male and female were similar, with the female being lighter. Sir Joseph Banks became the first scientist to discover this species when he visited New Zealand on James Cook's first voyage. Terrestrial and temperate, this species inhabited lowland tussock grassland and open fernlands. The first specimen to be obtained by a European was collected in 1827 by Jean René Constant Quoy and Joseph Paul Gaimard on Dumont D'Urville's voyage. The once abundant bird, known to have been hunted in numbers of up to 40 per day, began to decline in the early 1800s. Agriculture, fires, habitat degradation, the introduction of diseases, and the introduction of mammalian predators which came with people, led to their extinction by 1876. The NZ quail was most closely related to the stubble quail found in Australia. Despite being closely related the stubble quail is unable to fill the niche left by the NZ quail. Instead, the Australian brown quail is suggested as an analog to fill the gap.

== Description ==
The New Zealand quail was a plump, torpedo shaped bird with stout yellow legs for running through underbrush. The quail was about 22cm and had a mass of 200-220g. The quail had yellow legs and a short black bill. Both the male and female had a rufous/brown base colour with white and black streaks. Both had scaled underparts with intense black spotting. Both had a brow/hazelnut eye with a faint white eye ring. Primary and secondary wing feathers on both male and female New Zealand quails were plain, brown and lacked any wing bars.

The male had a rufous supercilia, a orange/rufous throat, and a dark mustache. The female has a buff, plain supercilia, and a plain white throat. Additionally, the female could be distinguished by her slightly larger size. Juveniles were like adult females but with pale underparts compared to the adult counterparts.

== Taxonomy ==
Research was conducted between 2007 and 2009 into whether the quails on Tiritiri Matangi Island – which was spared the worst impact of introduced predators – might be a surviving population of this species, or koreke-brown quail (Synoicus ypsilophora) hybrids. However, a genetic study showed that the quail on Tiritiri Matangi are brown quail. Sequences were derived for all quail species within the Australian and New Zealand Coturnix sp. complex.

The New Zealand quail has been considered conspecific with the Australian stubble quail (Coturnix pectoralis), which would then be named Coturnix novaezelandiae pectoralis as the New Zealand bird was described first. However, the genetic analysis has shown that they are separate though closely related species.

== Habitat and distribution ==
Both the north and South Island of New Zealand were home to the New Zealand quail. The South Island, specifically the southern alps had abundant populations of these birds. Intense agriculture, fires and introduction of predators in the North Island led to a decrease in numbers on the north island in the early 1800s and eventually led to their extinction by the late 1870s.

The New Zealand Quail lived in grassy, open habitats where they could forage, lay eggs, and hide in the long grass. As people began to increase the area of deforested, open areas, the range of these birds grew accordingly.

== Behavior ==
=== Vocalization ===
The birds were reported as having a “twit, twit, twit, twee twit” call. Thought to be most talkative in wet or damp weather.

=== Diet ===
The diet of the New Zealand quail is not fully known. It is expected that it was herbivorous eating seeds and plants. The Australian brown quail which is a suggested analog of the NZ quail has a similar diet of seeds, flowers, leaves but with the addition of invertebrates as does the closely related stubble quail.

=== Reproduction ===
Little is known of the reproduction of the NZ quail.

They created cup shaped nests in the grass and likely behaved similarly to the Australian brown quail who lay eggs between July and January are incubated by the female of the breeding pair. The New Zealand quail are thought to have had a clutch of 10-12 eggs which are buff with brown blotches and are suspected to have been incubated for about 21 days.

== Gallery ==
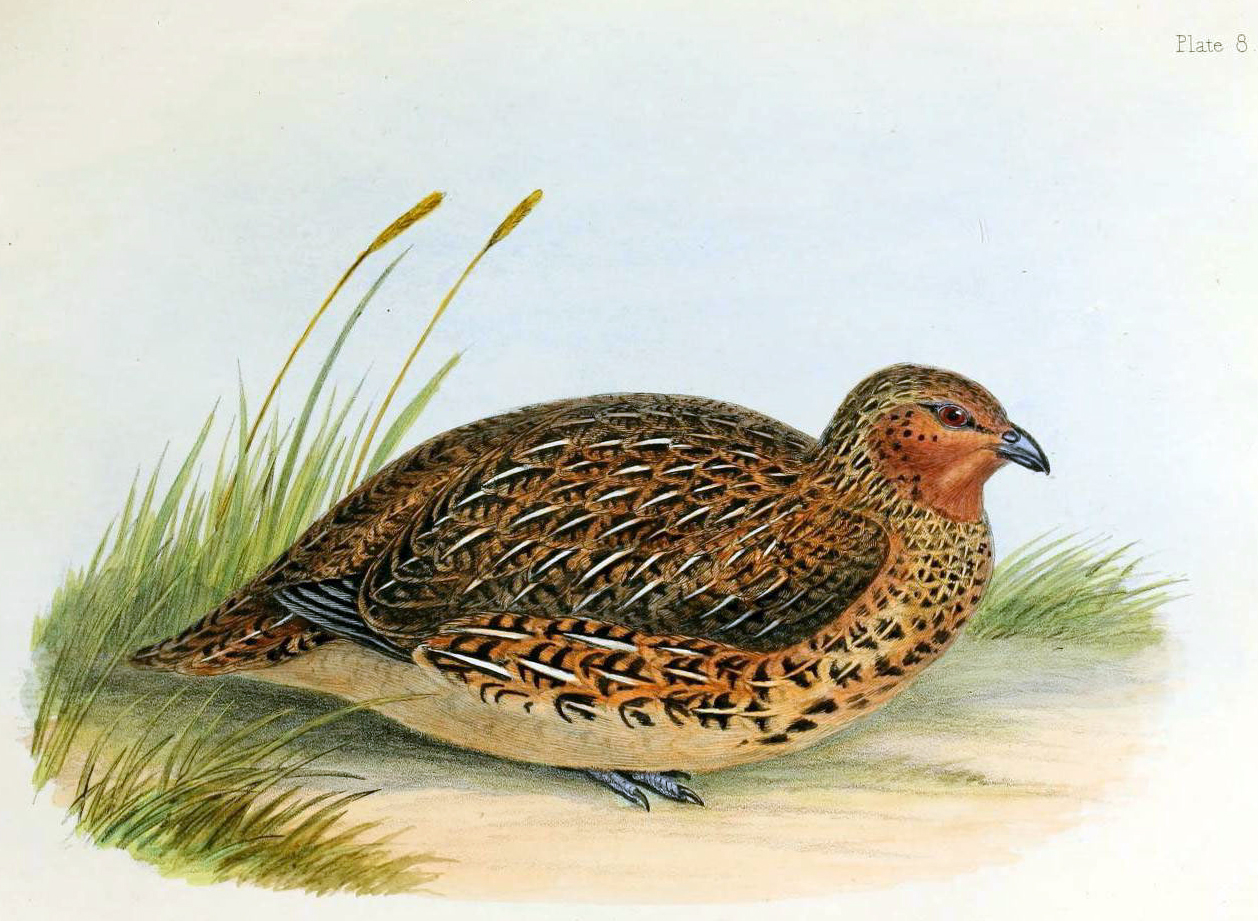
Illustration

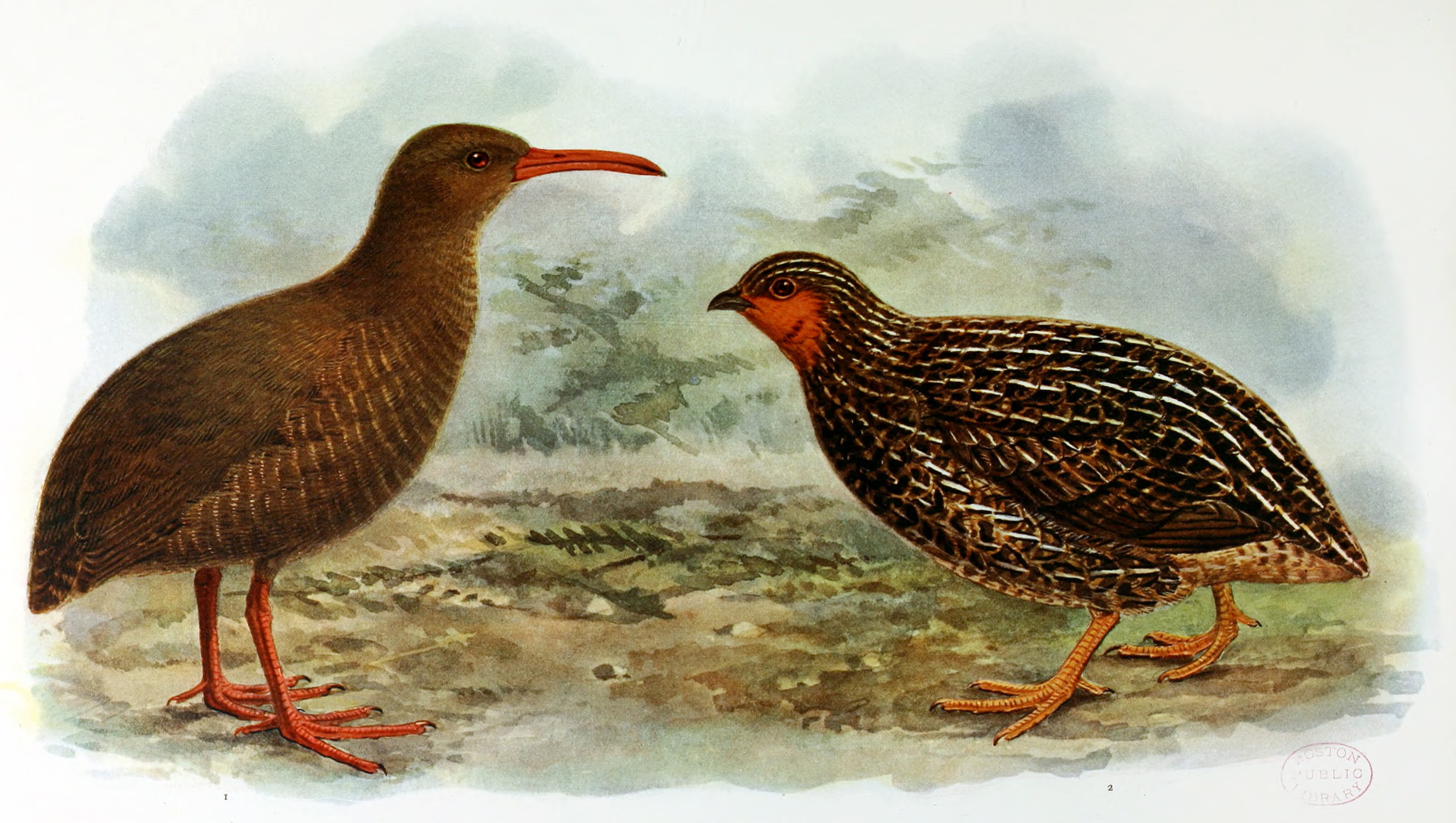
Illustration of the Chatham rail and the New Zealand quail from 1907
