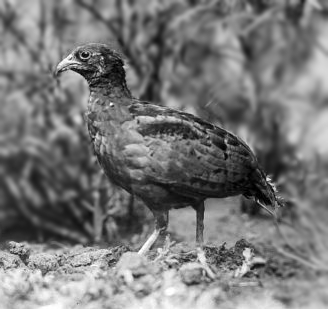
- Male

Conservation status
- Near Threatened (IUCN 3.1)

Scientific classification
- Kingdom: Animalia
- Phylum: Chordata
- Class: Aves
- Order: Galliformes
- Family: Phasianidae
- Genus: Rhizothera
- Species: R. longirostris

Binomial name
- Rhizothera longirostris (Temminck, 1815)

= Long-billed partridge =

Species of bird

The long-billed partridge (Rhizothera longirostris) is a species of bird in the family Phasianidae.

== Distribution and habitat ==
It is found in the Malay Peninsula, Sumatra and the lowlands of Borneo. Its natural habitats are subtropical or tropical dry forest, subtropical or tropical moist lowland forest, and subtropical or tropical moist montane forest. It is threatened by habitat loss.

== Taxonomy ==
In the past it was treated as having two distinct subspecies; the nominate race R. l. longirostris, and R. l. dulitensis, but the latter, restricted to montane altitudes in Borneo, has now been split as a separate species, Dulit partridge (R. dulitensis). Long-billed partridge is distinguished from the Dulit partridge in having a narrower grey band on the chest, and an orange, rather than whitish, belly.
