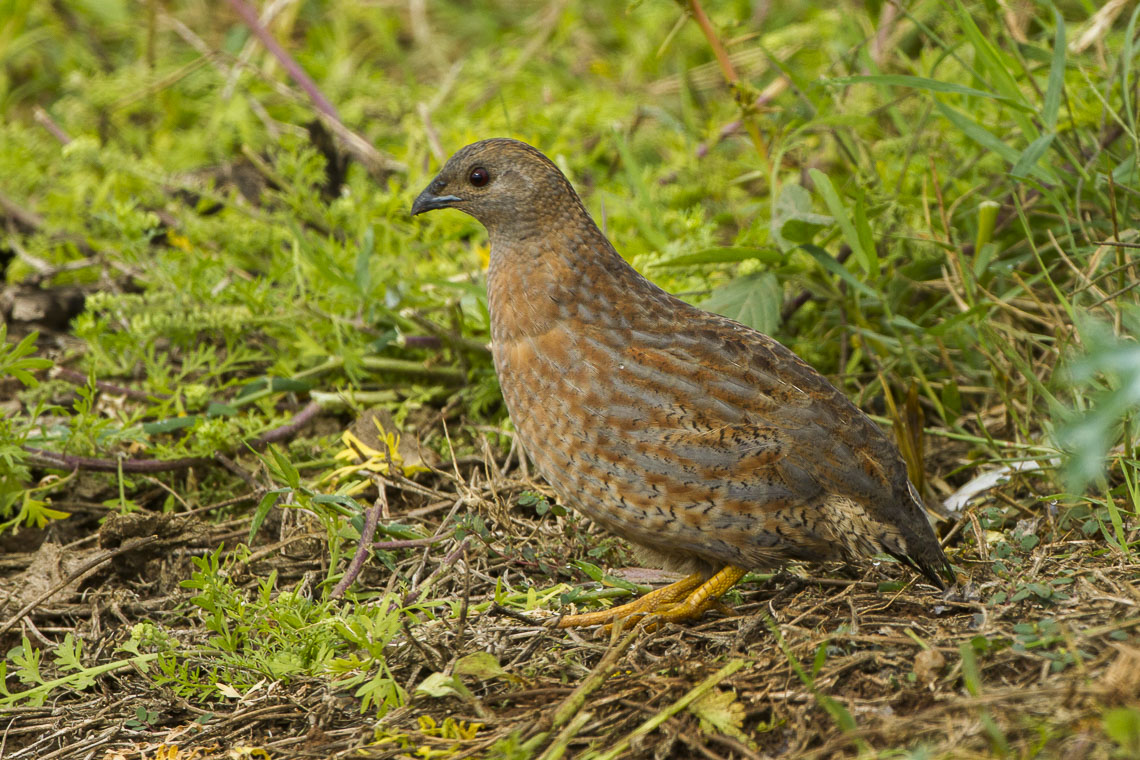
- S. ypsilophorus
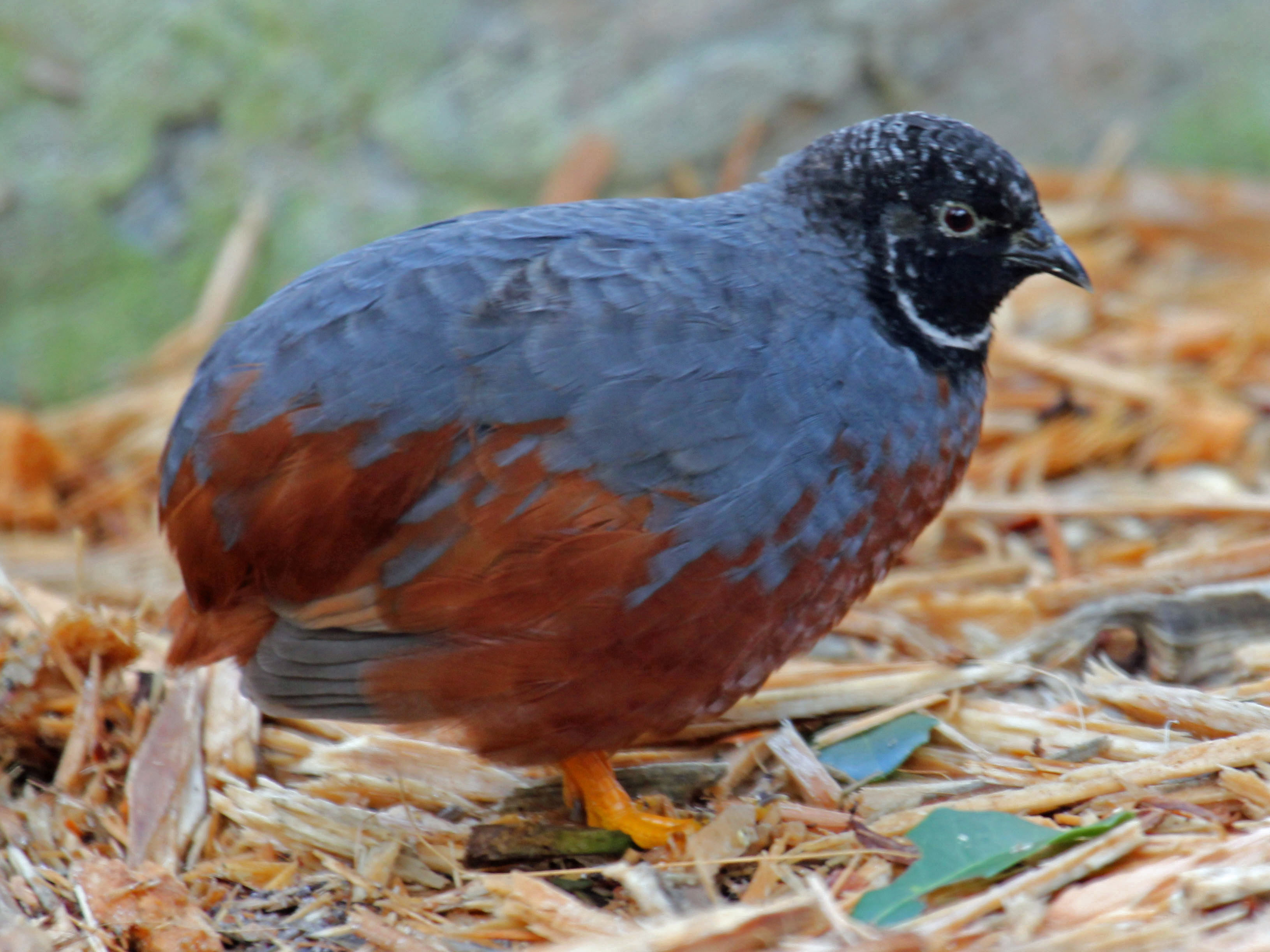
- S. chinensis

Scientific classification
- Kingdom: Animalia
- Phylum: Chordata
- Class: Aves
- Order: Galliformes
- Family: Phasianidae
- Tribe: Coturnicini
- Genus: Synoicus; Gould, 1843

Type species
- Tetrao ypsilophorus Bosc, 1792

Species
- See text

Synonyms
- Anurophasis van Oort, 1910; Excalfactoria Bonaparte, 1856

= Synoicus =

Genus of birds

Synoicus is a genus of 4 species of Old World quail.

The species in the genus are distributed throughout sub-Saharan Africa, tropical Asia, and Australasia. Two of the four species in the genus were originally classified in Excalfactoria, one was classified in Anurophasis, and one was classified in Coturnix. Several phylogenetic studies found these species to all group together into a single genus, which was followed by the International Ornithological Congress in 2021.

== Species ==
Genus Synoicus – Gould, 1843 – four species
| Common name | Scientific name and subspecies | Range | Size and ecology | IUCN status and estimated population |
|---|---|---|---|---|
| Brown quail | Synoicus ypsilophorus (Bosc, 1792) Nine subspecies: S. y. raaltenii (Müller, S, 1842); S. y. pallidior Hartert, EJO, 1897; S. y. saturatior Hartert, EJO, 1897; S. y. dogwa Mayr & Rand, 1935; S. y. plumbeus Salvadori, 1895; S. y. monticola Mayr & Rand, 1935; S. y. mafulu Mayr & Rand, 1935; S. y. australis (Latham, 1801); S. y. ypsilophorus (Bosc, 1792) | Mainland Australia, Tasmania and Papua New Guinea; introduced to New Zealand and Fiji | Size: Habitat: Diet: | LC |
| Snow Mountain quail | Synoicus monorthonyx (van Oort, 1910) | Snow and Star Mountains, West Papua (Indonesia) and Papua New Guinea | Size: Habitat: Diet: | LC |
| King quail | Synoicus chinensis (Linnaeus, 1766) Six subspecies: S. c. chinensis (Linnaeus, 1766); S. c. trinkutensis Richmond, 1902; S. c. lineatus (Scopoli, 1786); S. c. lepidus (Hartlaub, 1879); S. c. victoriae (Mathews, 1912); S. c. colletti (Mathews, 1912) | India and Sri Lanka east to Taiwan, south to eastern Australia | Size: Habitat: Diet: | LC |
| Blue quail | Synoicus adansonii (Verreaux & Verreaux, 1851) | Sub-Saharan Africa, from Zambia north to Ethiopia, and west to Sierra Leone | Size: Habitat: Diet: | LC |
