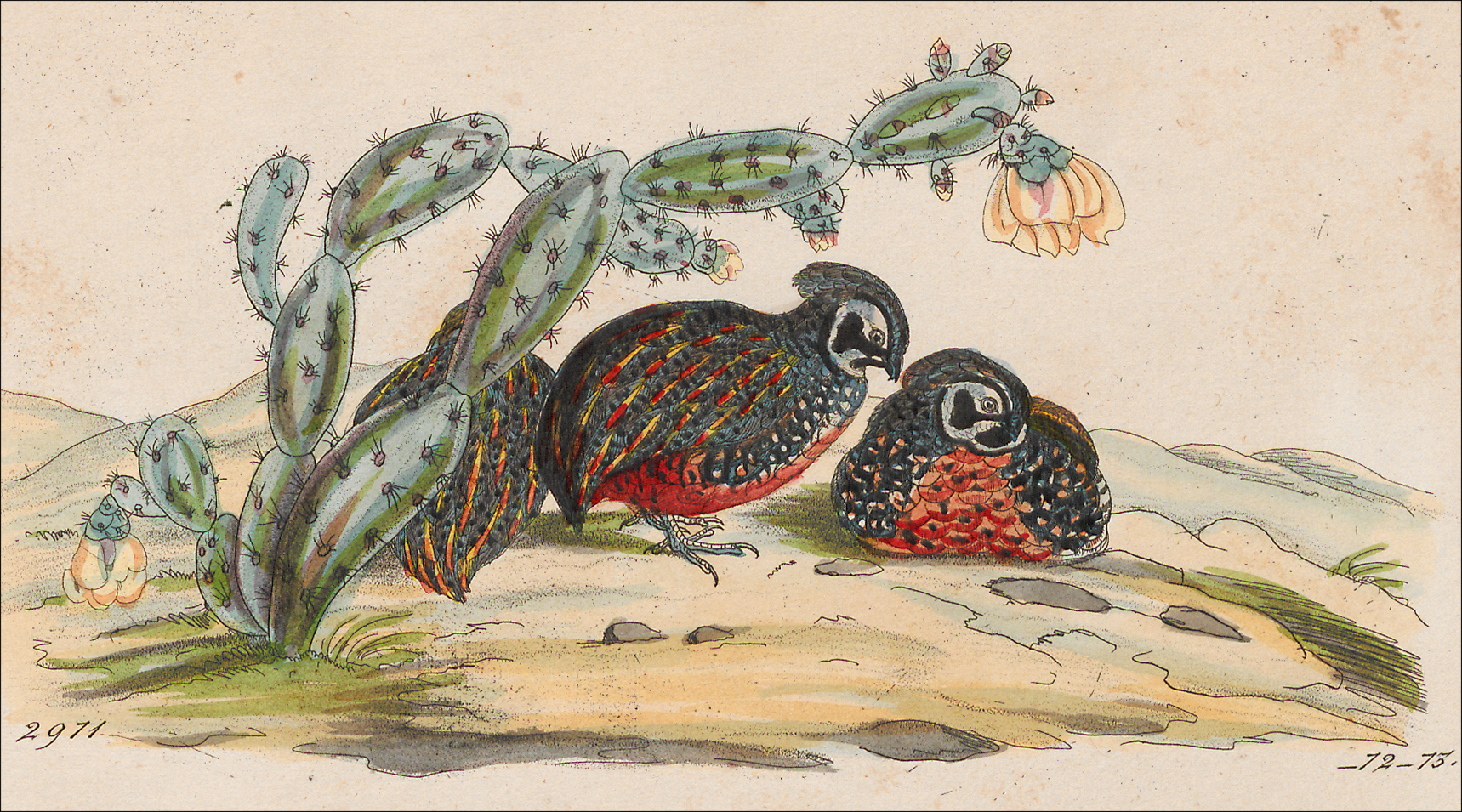

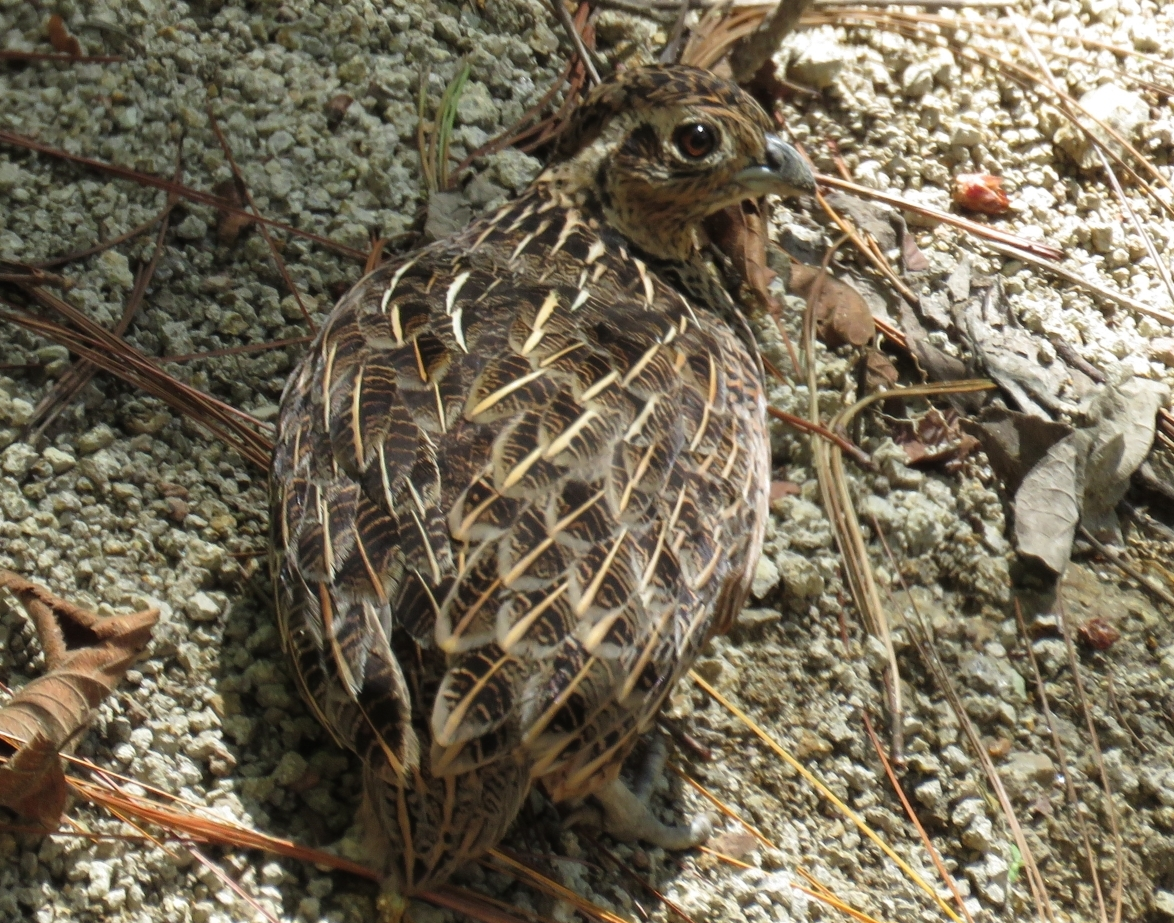

Conservation status
- Vulnerable (IUCN 3.1)

Scientific classification
- Kingdom: Animalia
- Phylum: Chordata
- Class: Aves
- Order: Galliformes
- Family: Odontophoridae
- Genus: Cyrtonyx
- Species: C. ocellatus

Binomial name
- Cyrtonyx ocellatus (Gould, 1837)

= Ocellated quail =

Species of bird

The ocellated quail (Cyrtonyx ocellatus) is a species of bird in the family Odontophoridae, the New World quail. It is found in El Salvador, Guatemala, Honduras, Mexico, and Nicaragua.

== Taxonomy and systematics ==
The ocellated quail shares genus Cyrtonyx with the Montezuma quail (C. montezumae) and Salle’s quail (C. sallei). It is monotypic.

== Description ==
The ocellated quail is 20.5 to 23 cm (8.1 to 9.1 in) long. Males weigh an estimated 218 g (7.7 oz) and females an estimated 182 g (6.4 oz). The adult male's face has a black and white harlequin pattern. Its crown and nape are buffy brown to olive brown with a thick tawny crest on the rear of the crown. The throat is white with black stripes. Its upperparts are gray and brown with cinnamon stripes and black spots. The central breast is tawny cinnamon and its edges gray with cinnamon spots. The belly is a deeper cinnamon, the flanks gray with cinnamon scallops, and the vent area black. The female's face is buffy and black, the crest tawny, and the upperparts brown with buff lines. The breast and belly are wine red with black bars and spots.

== Distribution and habitat ==
The ocellated quail is or was found in far southern Mexico, Guatemala, Honduras, El Salvador, and possibly Nicaragua. Only in Guatemala have there been a significant number of sightings since the late 1900s, with none in El Salvador and in Nicaragua only a c. 1900 specimen and a few early 2000s sight records near the Honduran border. It inhabits shrubland and open pine and oak forest, generally between 750 and 3,050 m (2,460 and 10,010 ft) of elevation.

== Behavior ==
=== Feeding ===
The ocellated quail is entirely terrestrial. It forages for tubers and roots by digging with its feet. Especially during the breeding season it also takes a variety of insects.

=== Breeding ===
Almost nothing is known about the ocellated quail's breeding phenology. In Guatemala it is reported to breed between April and August. The nest and eggs have not been described.

=== Vocalization ===
Though they have not been described in detail, the ocellated quail's vocalizations are similar to those of Montezuma quail. The male apparently sings "a single descending, buzzy whistle" and the female "a descending series of short notes".

== Status ==
The IUCN has assessed the ocellated quail as Vulnerable. Its population is estimated at fewer than 10,000 individuals. The species "has been undergoing a rapid population decline over the past ten years as a result of increased demand for agricultural land due to human population increases, mining concessions in its stronghold of Guatemala and increased hunting pressure."
