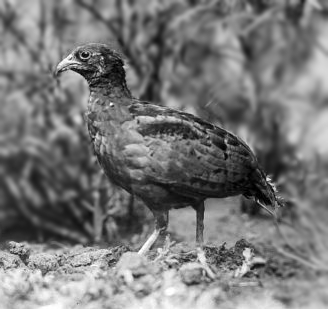
- Long-billed partridge (Rhizothera longirostris)

Scientific classification
- Kingdom: Animalia
- Phylum: Chordata
- Class: Aves
- Order: Galliformes
- Superfamily: Phasianoidea
- Family: Phasianidae
- Subfamily: Phasianinae
- Genus: Rhizothera; G.R. Gray, 1841

Type species
- Perdix longirostris

Species
- Rhizothera longirostris Rhizothera dulitensis

= Rhizothera =

Genus of birds

Rhizothera is a bird genus in the family Phasianidae, native to Malaysia and Indonesia. The genus is the only one in the tribe Rhizotherini. Established by George Robert Gray in 1841, it currently contains two accepted species:

- Long-billed partridge (Rhizothera longirostris)
- Dulit partridge (Rhizothera dulitensis)

The name Rhizothera is constructed of two Greek words: rhiza, meaning "root" and -thēras, meaning "-hunter".

Although their taxonomic relationships were formerly a mystery, with some taxonomists placing them with the more basal genera such as Arborophila and Xenoperdix that were formerly classified within the paraphyletic "Perdicinae" (this basal group is now known as Rollulinae), more recent phylogenetic studies place them as the sister group to the tribe Phasianini, which contains many well-known and widespread genera such as Perdix and Phasianus.
