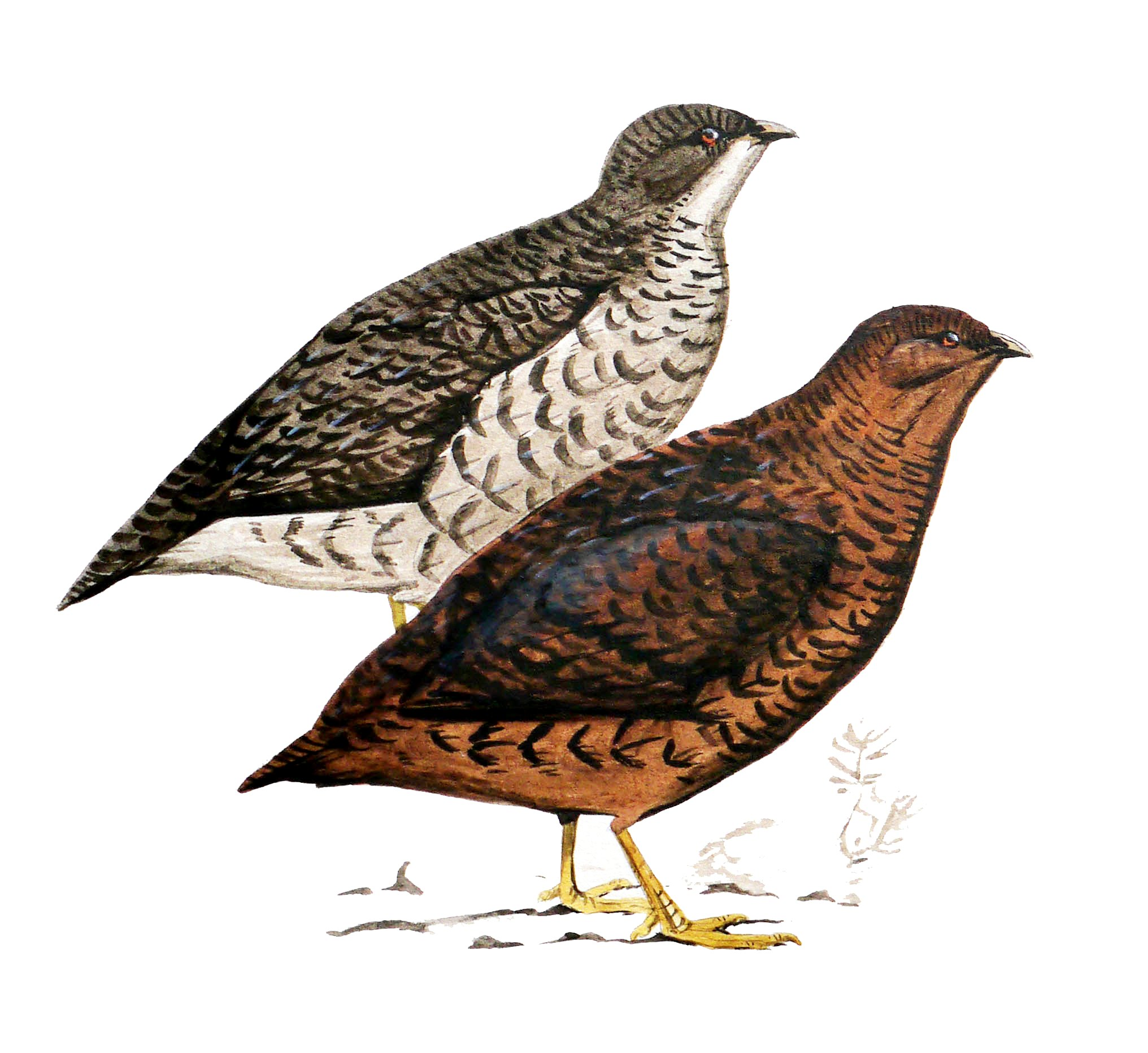
- Illustration of female and male (in front)

Conservation status
- Least Concern (IUCN 3.1)

Scientific classification
- Kingdom: Animalia
- Phylum: Chordata
- Class: Aves
- Order: Galliformes
- Family: Phasianidae
- Genus: Synoicus
- Species: S. monorthonyx

Binomial name
- Synoicus monorthonyx (van Oort, 1910)
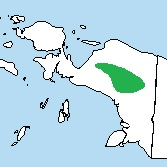
- range in Papua, Indonesia

Synonyms
- Anurophasis monorthonyx van Oort, 1910

= Snow Mountain quail =

Species of bird

The Snow Mountain quail (Synoicus monorthonyx), is a roughly 28-cm-long (11 in), dark brown quail of alpine grasslands. It was formerly considered the only member of the genus Anurophasis, but phylogenetic analysis places it as the sister species to the brown quail (S. ypsilophorus) in the genus Synoicus. It has heavily marked brown plumage, a pale yellow bill, yellow legs and a brown iris. The underparts of the female are whitish and more distinctly barred black than in the male.

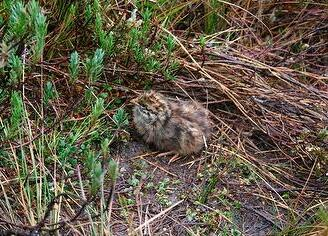
Chick of the Snow Mountain quail

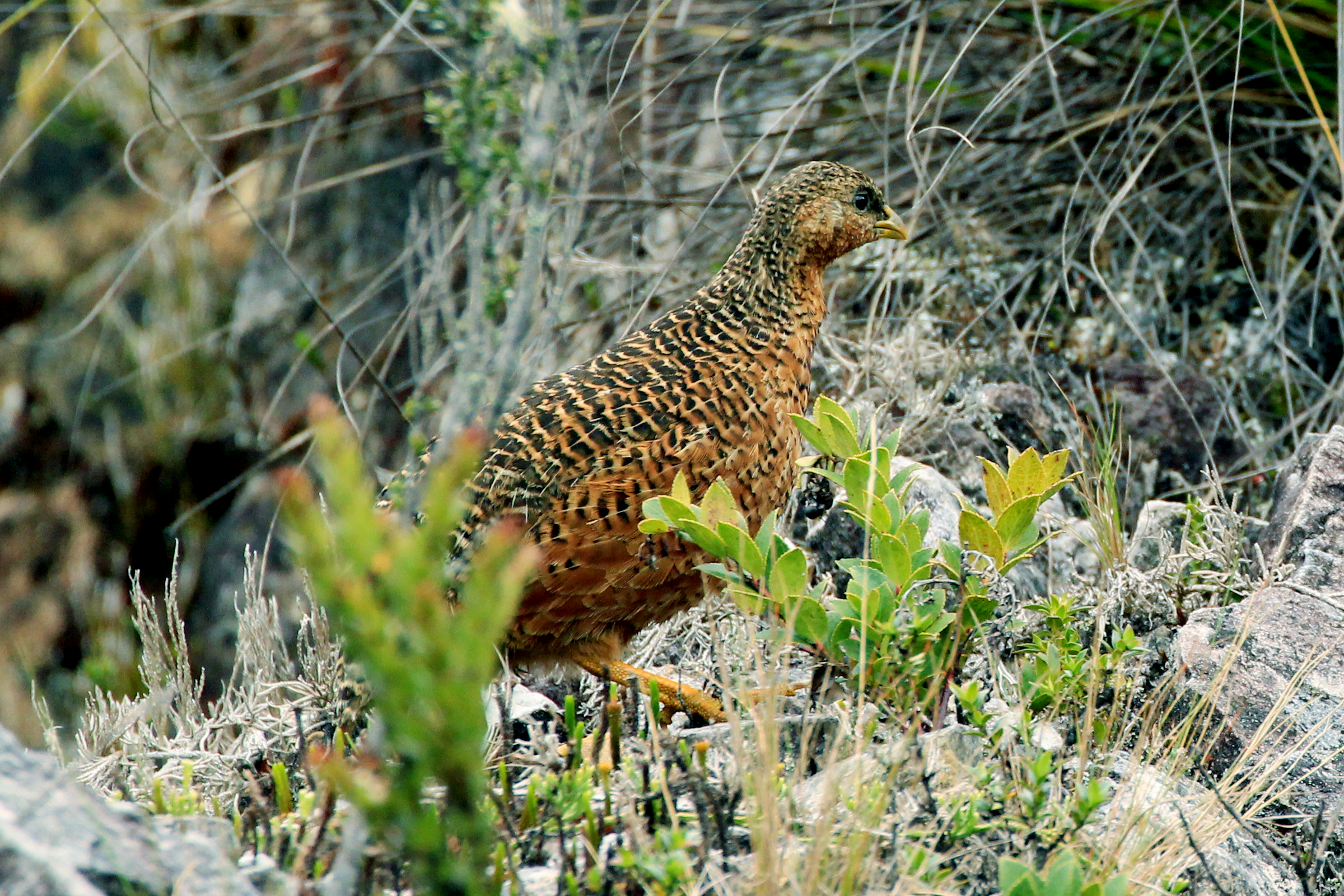
Adult male in Lorentz National Park

The Snow Mountain quail is confined to Western New Guinea's highest elevations, the Snow and Star Mountains. This little-known bird is protected only by the remoteness of its habitat, a mostly inaccessible area at altitudes of 3,200–4,200 m (10,500–13,800 ft).

The female usually lays up to three, pale brown, dark-spotted eggs in a hollow nest under the edge of a grass tussock. The diet consists mainly of seeds, flowers, leaves, and other vegetable matter.

Due to its large range which is largely inaccessible to human encroachment, the Snow Mountain quail is evaluated as least concern on the IUCN Red List of Threatened Species.
