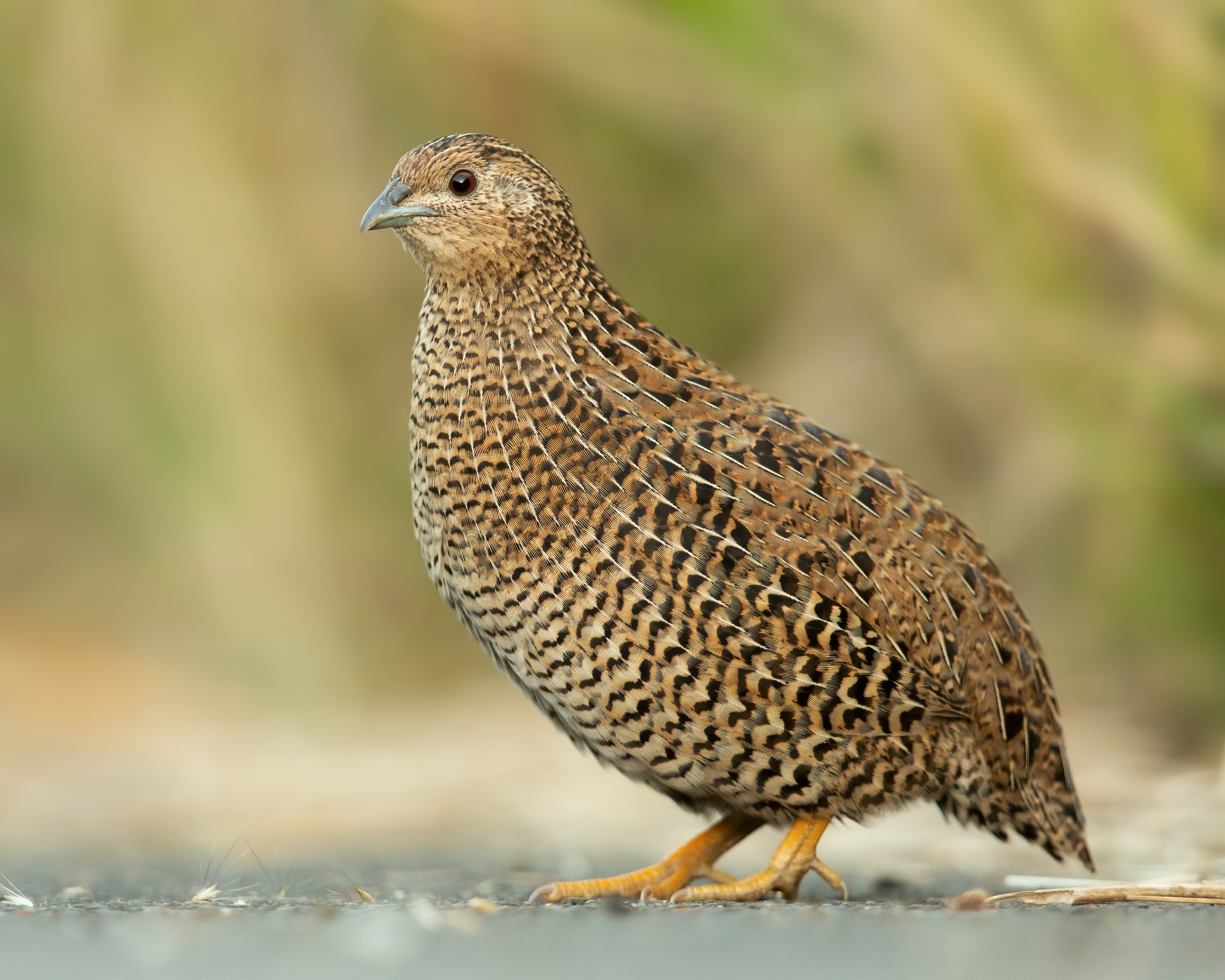

Conservation status
- Least Concern (IUCN 3.1)

Scientific classification
- Kingdom: Animalia
- Phylum: Chordata
- Class: Aves
- Order: Galliformes
- Family: Phasianidae
- Genus: Synoicus
- Species: S. ypsilophorus

Binomial name
- Synoicus ypsilophorus (Bosc, 1792)
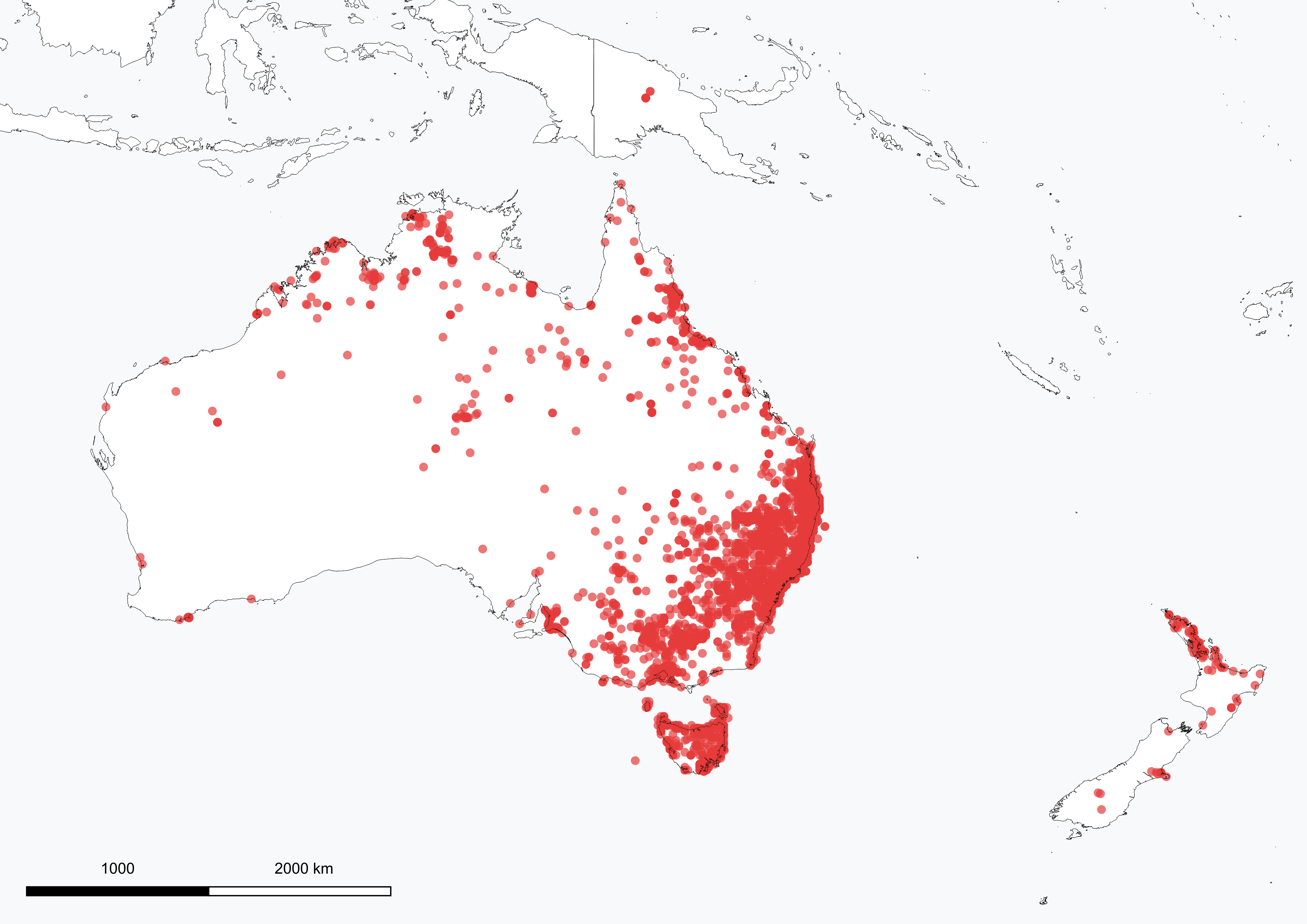
- Species distribution

Synonyms
- Coturnix ypsilophora Bosc, 1792

= Brown quail =

Species of bird

The brown quail (Synoicus ypsilophorus), also known as the swamp quail, silver quail and Tasmanian quail, is an Australasian true quail of the family Phasianidae. It is a small, ground-dwelling bird and is native to mainland Australia, Tasmania and Papua New Guinea and has been introduced to New Zealand and Fiji. Widespread and common throughout its large range, the brown quail is evaluated as being of least concern by the International Union for Conservation of Nature on the IUCN Red List of Threatened Species.

== Taxonomy ==
Although previously classified in the genus Coturnix, phylogenetic analyses have found it to form a monophyletic grouping with several other quail species, all of which have since been grouped in the genus Synoicus. It is thought to be the sister species to the Snow Mountain quail (S. monorthonyx), which was previously classified in the genus Anurophasis.

The following subspecies are recognised:

- S. y. raaltenii (Müller, S, 1842) - central and eastern Lesser Sundas, Tanimbar Islands
- S. y. pallidior Hartert, EJO, 1897 - Sumba and Savu
- S. y. saturatior Hartert, EJO, 1897 - lowland northern New Guinea
- S. y. dogwa Mayr & Rand, 1935 - lowland south-central New Guinea (Trans-Fly region)
- S. y. plumbeus Salvadori, 1895 - lowlands of Huon Peninsula and southeastern New Guinea
- S. y. monticola Mayr & Rand, 1935 - high montane southeastern New Guinea
- S. y. mafulu Mayr & Rand, 1935 - mid-montane eastern and southeastern New Guinea
- S. y. australis (Latham, 1801) - mainland Australia
- S. y. ypsilophorus (Bosc, 1792) - Tasmania

== Description ==
The brown quail is a plump, stocky bird which can grow up to a length of 17 to 22 centimetres (6 1/2 to 8 1/2 in) and weight of 75 to 140 grams (2 3/4 to 5 oz). The colour is quite variable over the bird's wide range. The male is reddish-brown speckled with black on the head and upper neck and mainly reddish-brown on back and wings. The underparts range from buff or rufous to brown, but always with fine black chevron-shaped barring. The tail is short, dark brown with yellowish barring. The female is similar but rather paler. There are small black spots on the shoulder of the female and the upperparts are barred with dark chevron-shaped markings.

The voice consists of a variety of shrill calls with which the birds communicate as they move through dense vegetation. One call is a double whistle, the latter note ascending.

== Distribution and habitat ==
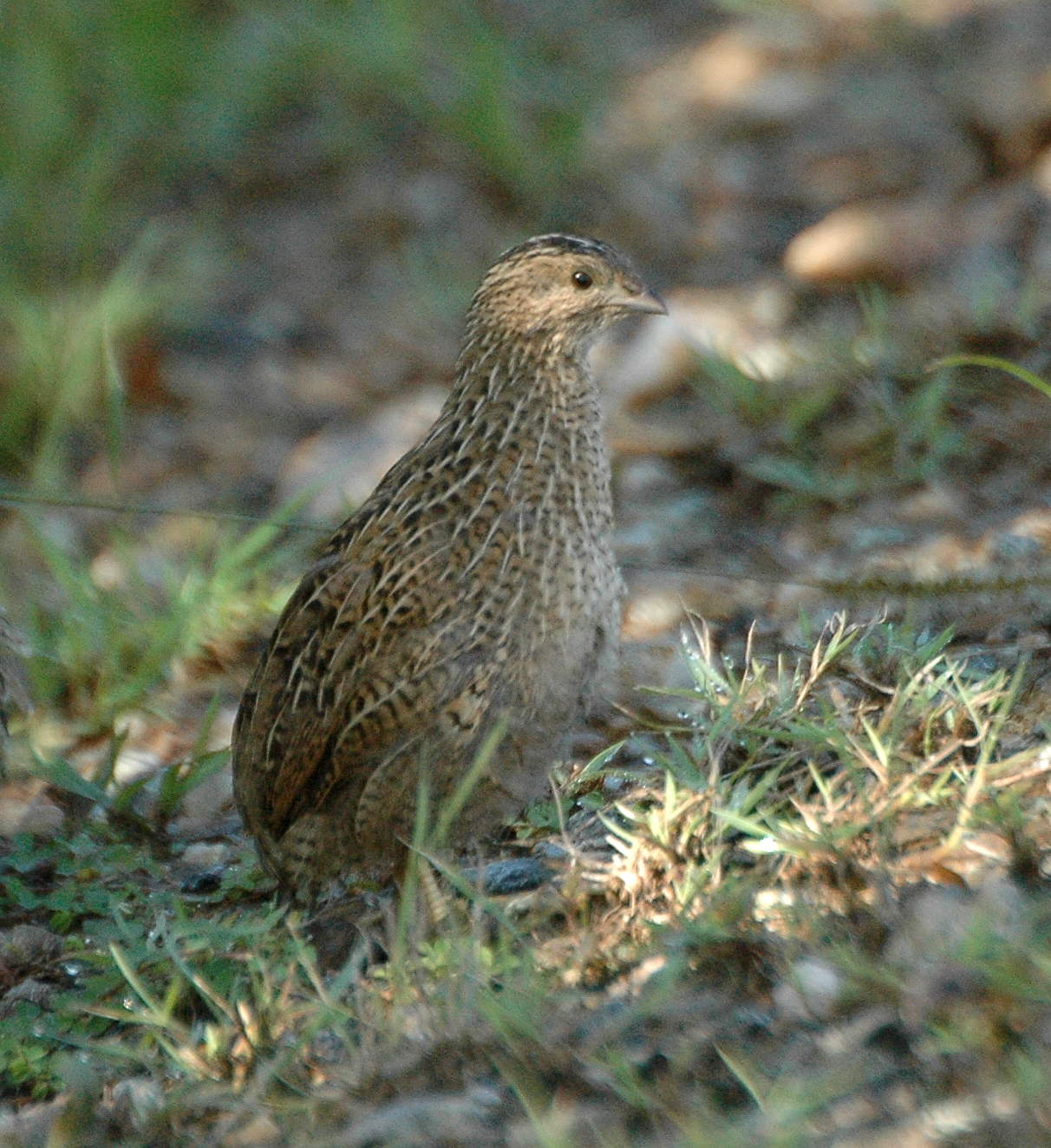
Female

The brown quail is distributed in agricultural areas, wet grasslands, shrublands, spinifex savannah, and freshwater wetlands across much of New Guinea and the Lesser Sunda Islands as well as in northern, eastern, south-eastern and south-western Australia and Tasmania, though absent from arid regions. This species has been introduced to Fiji and New Zealand. In Australia it is mostly a lowland species but in New Zealand it is found at elevations up to 1,000 metres (3,300 ft) and in New Guinea up to 3,700 metres (12,000 ft). It was introduced to New Zealand in the 1860s and 1870s and is now present in North Island and certain offshore islands. This introduction, and other quail introductions that failed to establish, may have played a part in the demise of the New Zealand quail, an endemic species that became extinct shortly afterwards, possibly because of a lack of resistance to some new disease.

== Biology ==
The brown quail is a ground-dwelling bird that prefers to hide or run rather than fly. It is found in small groups and feeds on grasses, seeds, shoots and small invertebrates. If the group is startled and take to the air, the birds scatter by flying in different directions, regrouping when the danger has passed.

Brown quails form breeding pairs in the spring. There is an extended breeding season with clutches of half a dozen or more eggs being laid in a shallow scraped nest lined with grasses on the ground, often concealed in a grass tussock or shrubby bush. These are incubated by the female for the three-week incubation period. The newly hatched chicks are precocial and are cared for by both parents for a while, with the male taking on the caring role after two weeks to allow the female to start on the next clutch of eggs.

== Status ==
The brown quail has a very wide range and is common in much of that range. The International Union for Conservation of Nature has assessed its conservation status as being of least concern. Although the population has not been quantified, and may be declining slightly, it does not seem to be at such a rate as to warrant listing the species in a more threatened category.

== In Aboriginal language and culture ==
The Kunwinjku people of western Arnhem Land call this bird djirndih, djiribbidj or merhmerh (all quails).
