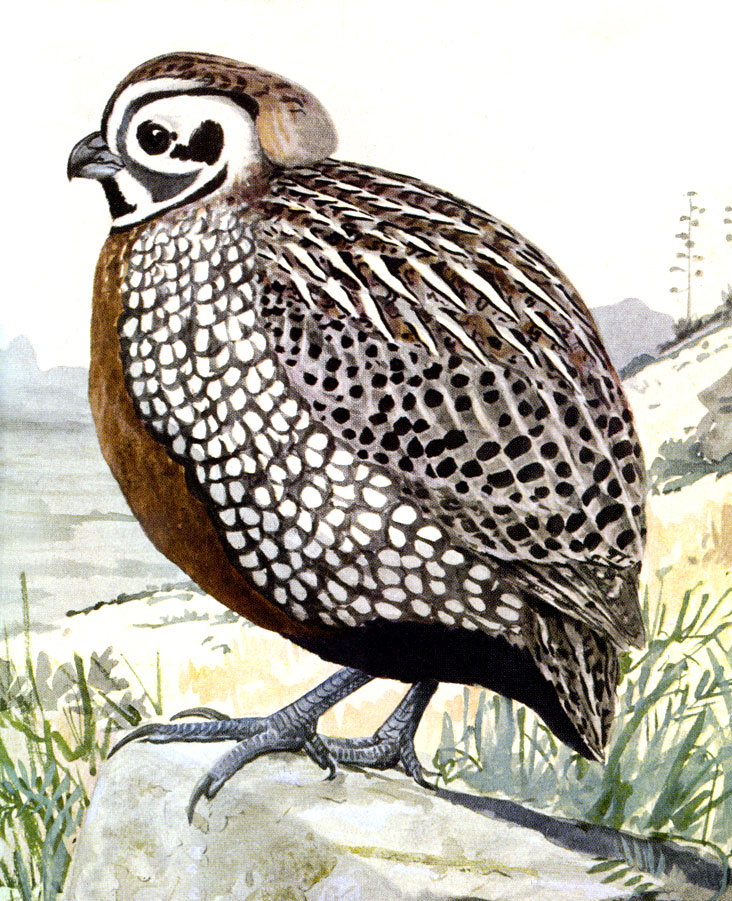
- Cyrtonyx montezumae

Scientific classification
- Kingdom: Animalia
- Phylum: Chordata
- Class: Aves
- Order: Galliformes
- Family: Odontophoridae
- Genus: Cyrtonyx; Gould, 1844

Type species
- Ortyx montezumae Vigors, 1830

= Cyrtonyx =

Genus of birds

Cyrtonyx is a bird genus in the New World quail family Odontophoridae.

The genus Cyrtonyx was introduced in 1844 by the English ornithologist and bird artist John Gould. The name combines the Ancient Greek kurtos meaning "curved" and onux meaning "nail" or "claw". The type species is the Montezuma quail (Cyrtonyx montezumae).

== Species ==
The genus contains two species:

Image	Common name	Scientific name	Distribution
	Montezuma quail	Cyrtonyx montezumae	Mexico, Southwest United States
	Ocellated quail	Cyrtonyx ocellatus	Mexico, Guatemala, Honduras, El Salvador, and Nicaragua
