= Monastery of Saint Gerasimus =

The Monastery of Saint Gerasimus may refer to:

- Deir Hajla, a monastery in Palestine
- Saint Gerasimos Monastery, a monastery in Greece
