= October 20 (Eastern Orthodox liturgics) =

Day in the Eastern Orthodox liturgical calendar

Eastern Orthodox liturgical calendar
October 19	October 20	October 21
October 20 O.S. ≍ November 2 N.S. October 20 N.S ≍ October 7 O.S.

An Eastern Orthodox cross

October 20 in Eastern Orthodox liturgical calendars is a feast day and a day of commemoration of saints and martyrs. Although some Orthodox churches use the Revised Julian Calendar and others use the traditional Julian calendar, the fixed commemorations for their respective October 20 are broadly the same, no matter which calendar is used. (Note: Despite the dates being the same, the days to which they refer typically differ by 13 days. The notation Old Style or O.S. is sometimes used to indicate a date in the traditional Julian Calendar (the "Old Calendar"). The notation New Style or N.S. indicates a date in the Revised Julian calendar (the "New Calendar").).

== Saints ==
- Martyrs Zebinas of Caesarea in Palestine, Germanus, Nicephorus and Antoninus (308) (see also: November 12)
- Virgin-martyr Manatho (Maratho), burned alive in Scythopolis in Syria Palaestina (c. 286-305) (see also: November 12)
- Martyrs Aborsam (Eboras) and Senoe (Eunos), of Persia (c. 341) (see also: November 10)
- Saint Barsabias, abbot and missionary who was martyred in Persia (342)
- Great-martyr Artemius, at Antioch (362) (Note: Name days celebrated today include: Artemios (Ἀρτέμιος); Artemia, Artemis, Diana (Ἀρτεμία).) (Note: "At Antioch, St. Artemius, imperial officer. Although he had filled high stations in the army under Constantine the Great, Julian the Apostate, whom he had reprehended for his cruelty towards Christians, ordered him to be beaten with rods, subjected to other torments, and finally beheaded." He is the Patron saint of police officers.)
- Venerable Basil of Trabzon, Bishop of Trabzon (early 10th century) (Note: He is absent in the Synaxaria. However he is a local Saint of Trabzon. He lived during the reign of Byzantine Emperors Leo VI the Wise (886-912) and Constantine VII Porphyrogenitus (913-959).)

== Pre-Schism Western saints ==
- Saint Maximus of Aquila, a zealous deacon of Aquila, who was martyred by being thrown off an overhanging cliff under Decius (250) (Note: "At Abia, near Aquila, in Abruzzo, the birthday of blessed Maximus, deacon and martyr, who, through the desire of suffering, presented himself to the persecutors that sought him. After answering with great constancy, he was racked and tortured, then beaten with rods, and finally he died by being precipitated from an elevated place.")
- Saint Felician of Foligno, Bishop of Foligno, martyr (251) (Note: Born in Foligno in Italy, he was consecrated bishop and cared for his diocese for over fifty years, enlightening the whole of Umbria. He was arrested under Decius and died on his way to martyrdom in Rome.)
- Martyrs Martha, Saula and Companions, martyrs in Cologne in Germany. (Note: "At Cologne, the martyrdom of the holy virgins Martha and Saula, with many others.")
- Saint Caprasius of Agen, martyr (303) (Note: Born in Agen in the south of France, he hid during the persecution of Diocletian, but hearing of the courage of St. Faith, confessed his faith openly and was at once beheaded.) (Note: "At Agen, in France, St. Caprasius, martyr. As he was hiding himself in a cavern to avoid the violence of the persecution, the report of the blessed virgin Faith's courage in suffering for Christ animated him to endure torments, and he prayed to God that, if he were deemed worthy of the glory of martyrdom, clear water might flow from the rock of his cavern. God having granted his prayer, he went with confidence to the scene of combat, and after a valiant struggle, merited the palm of martyrdom under Maximian.")
- Saint Irene of Tomar, a nun martyred for her faith in Visigothic Portugal, honoured especially in Santarém (653) (Note: "In Portugal, St. Irene, virgin and martyr.")
- Saint Sindulf of Rheims, a hermit in Aussonce near Rheims in France, Confessor (660)
- Saints Bradan and Orora, two saints venerated in the Isle of Man (c. 7th century) (Note: ["Memorials of British Piety; or, An Anglican Martyrology," says: "In the Isle of Man on this day S. Bradan and S. Orora, formerly venerated in two churches, which still retain their names."]: "The Isle of Man was occupied by the Scots, and S. Germain (July 3) was the first bishop of that island. Two other bishops, Coninder and Romail, are named in the same century, the fifth, as exercising their functions in Man. Then came S. Maughold, Conan, Contentus, Blad, Malchus, Roolwer, William, and then S. Bradan, who has given his name to Kirk Bradan, near Douglas. Nothing is known about him.")
- Saint Acca of Hexham, Bishop of Hexham in England, Confessor (c. 740) (Note: A disciple of St Bosa of York in England and St Wilfrid and a companion of the latter in his travels. He became Abbot of St Andrew's in Hexham and in 709 he succeeded Wilfrid as bishop there. He was described by Bede as 'great in the sight of God and man'.)
- Saint Vitalis of Salzburg, St Rupert's successor as Abbot of St Peter's in Salzburg and Archbishop (717-745)
- Saint Aidan, Bishop of Mayo in Ireland (768)
- Saint Bernard of Bagnorea (of Castro), Bishop of Vulcia in Tuscany, Italy (c. 800)
- Saint Aderald, an Archdeacon of Troyes, who led a pilgrimage to the Holy Land, and built the monastery of the Holy Sepulchre at Samblières (1004) (Note: Born in Troyes in France, he went on pilgrimage to Palestine, returned with many holy relics and built the monastery of the Holy Sepulchre at Samblières.)

== Post-Schism Orthodox saints ==
- Venerable Matrona of Chios the Wonderworker (1462)
- Righteous Child Artemius of Verkola (1545) (Note: See: (in Russian) Артемий Веркольский. Википе́дия. (Russian Wikipedia).)
- Venerable Theodosius, Hieromonk of Svyatogorsk Monastery (1850)

=== New Martys and Confessors ===
- New Hieromartyr Nicholas Lyubomudrov, Priest of Latskoye village, Yaroslavl (1918) (Note: See: (in Russian) Любомудров, Николай Иванович. Википе́дия. (Russian Wikipedia).)
- New Hieromartyr Herman (Kokel), Bishop of Alatyr (1937) (Note: He was canonized in 2001. However he was excluded from the general church calendar in 2013, along with 36 other martyrs, without any explanation from the Russian Orthodox Church.: See: (in Russian) Герман (Кокель). Википе́дия. (Russian Wikipedia).)
- New Hieromartyrs Zosima Pepenin, (Note: See: (in Russian) Пепенин, Зосима Алексеевич. Википе́дия. (Russian Wikipedia).) John Ganchev, (Note: See: (in Russian) Иоанн Бакинский. Википе́дия. (Russian Wikipedia).) John Rechkin, John Rodionov, Nicholas Figurov, Leonid Nikolsky, John Talızin and Alexander Orlov, Priests (1937)
- New Hieromartyrs Michael Isaev and Peter Kravets, Deacons (1937)
- New Martyr Paul Bocharov (1937)
- Venerable Gabriel (Urgebadze), Archimandrite of Samtavro Monastery, Georgia, Confessor and Fool for Christ (1995)

== Other commemorations ==
- Translation of the relics (1581) of Venerable Gerasimus of Kefalonia, the New Ascetic (1579) (Note: Name days celebrated today include: Gerasimos, Yerasimos (Γεράσιμος); Gerasimina (Γερασιμίνα).)
- Translation of the relics (1814) of New Monk-martyr Ignatius of Bulgaria and Mount Athos from Constantinople to Mount Athos (1814)
- Translation of the relics (1979) of Venerable Gregory (Kallides) of Herakleia (1925) (Note: See: (in Greek) Γρηγόριος Καλλίδης. Βικιπαίδεια. (Greek Wikipedia).) (see also: July 25)
- Uncovering of the relics (2012) of New Hieromartyr Nikodim (Kononov), Bishop of Belgorod (1918) (Note: See: (in Russian) Никодим (Кононов). Википе́дия. (Russian Wikipedia).) (see also: October 22)
- Repose of Abbot Theodosius (Popov) of Optina Monastery (1903)
- Repose of Metropolitan John (Snychev) of St. Petersburg (1995) (Note: See: (in Russian) Иоанн (Снычёв). Википедии. (Russian Wikipedia).)

== Icon gallery ==
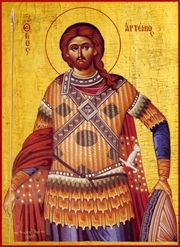
Great-martyr Artemius of Antioch.

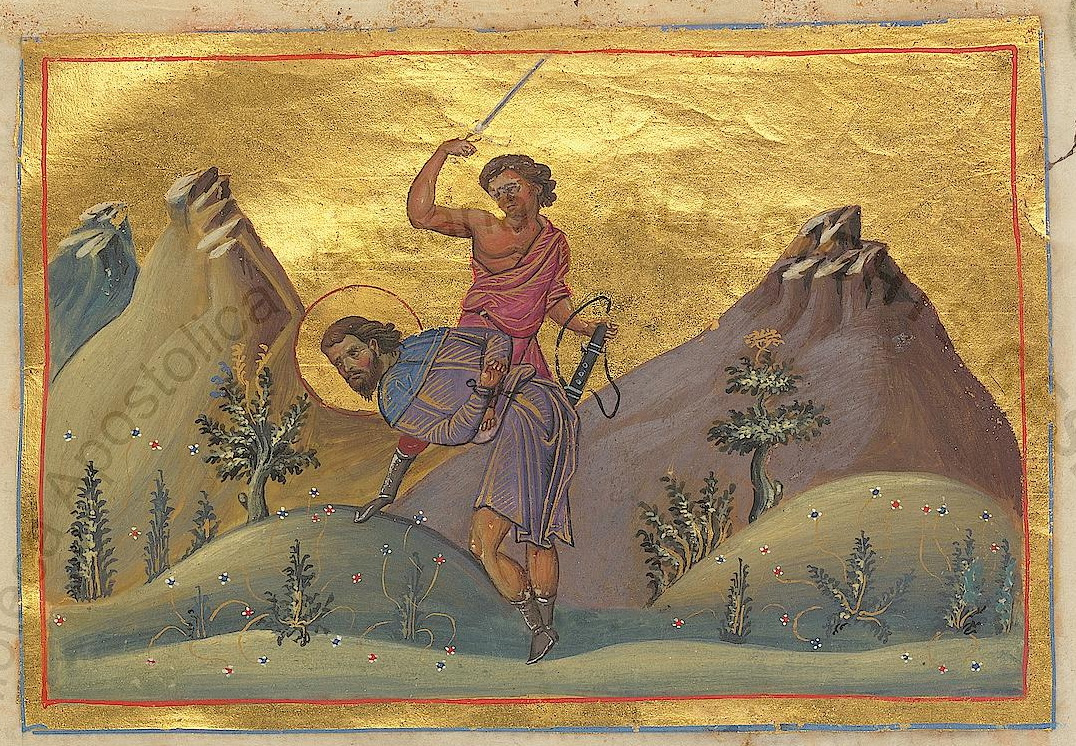
Great-martyr Artemius of Antioch.
(Menologion of Basil II, 10th century).

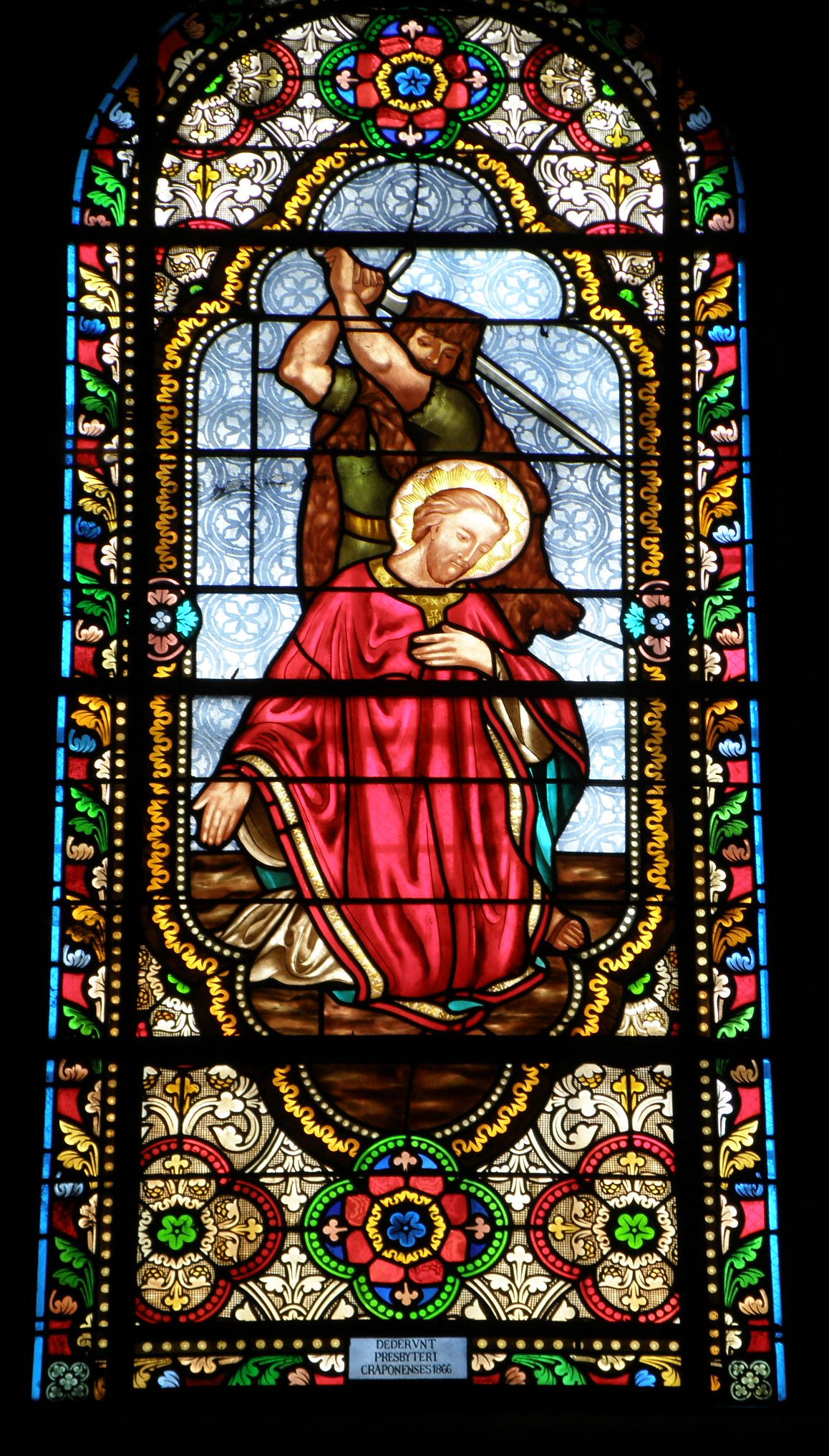
St. Caprasius of Agen, martyr.

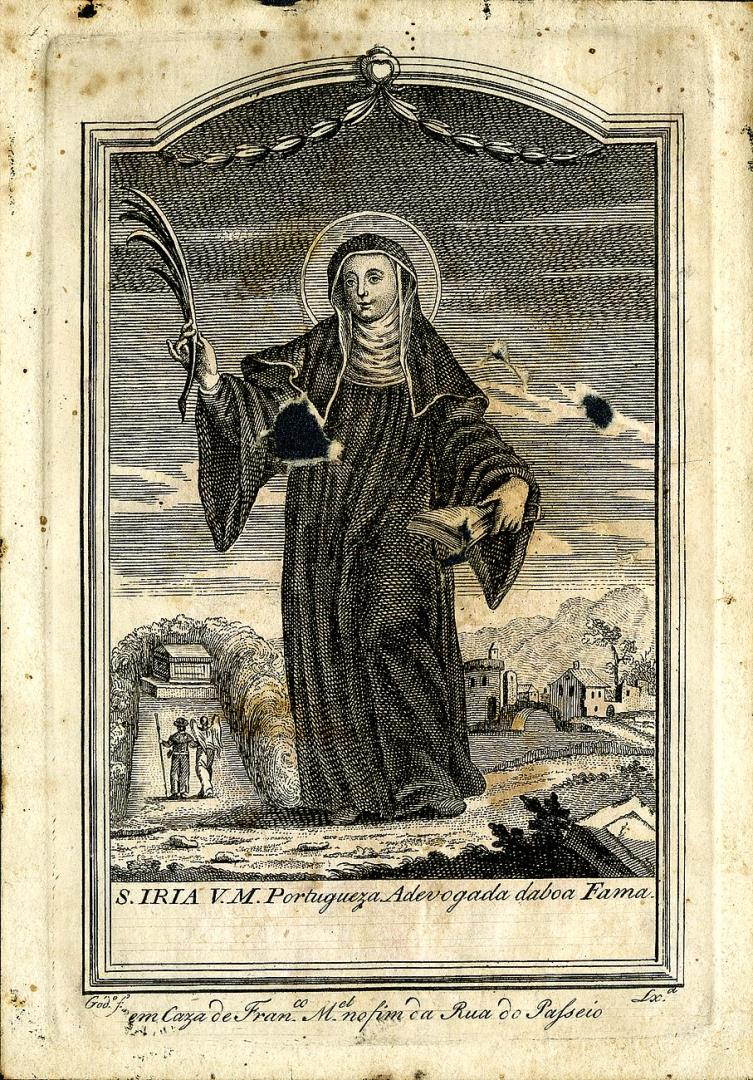
Saint Irene of Tomar, virgin-martyr.

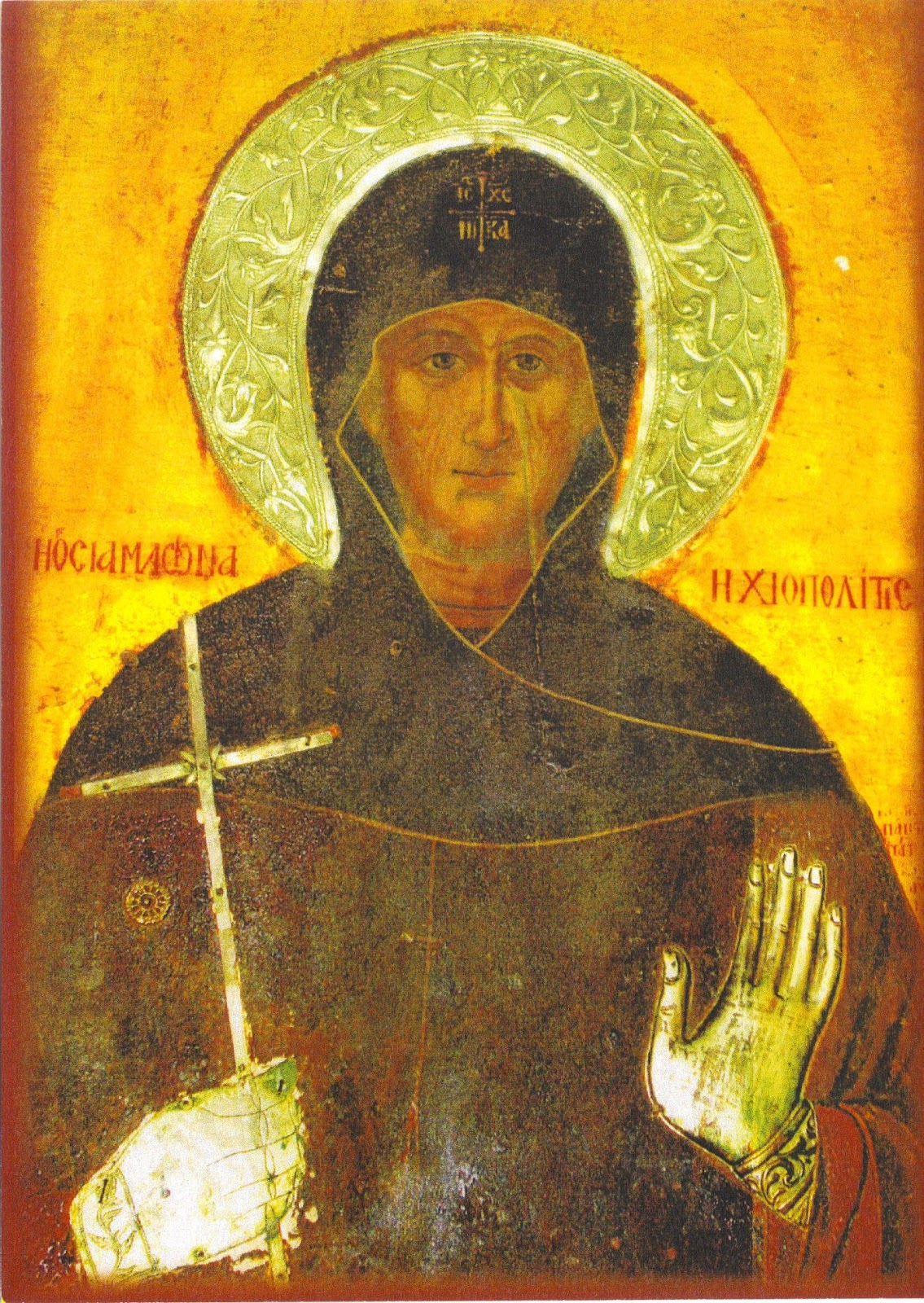
St. Matrona of Chios.

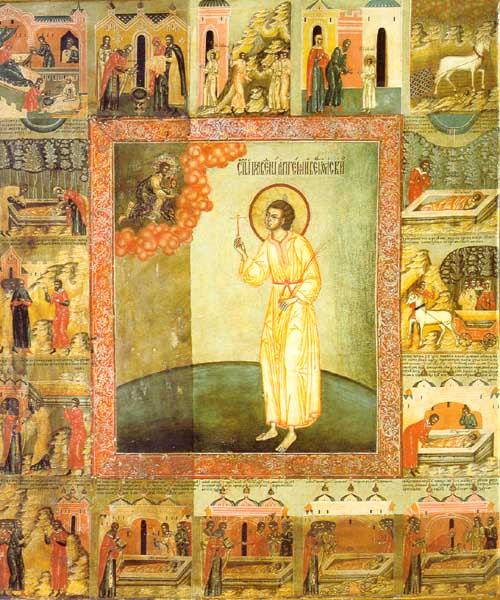
Righteous Child Artemius of Verkola.

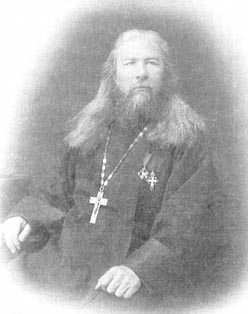
New Hieromartyr Nicholas Lyubomudrov, Priest of Latskoye village, Yaroslavl.

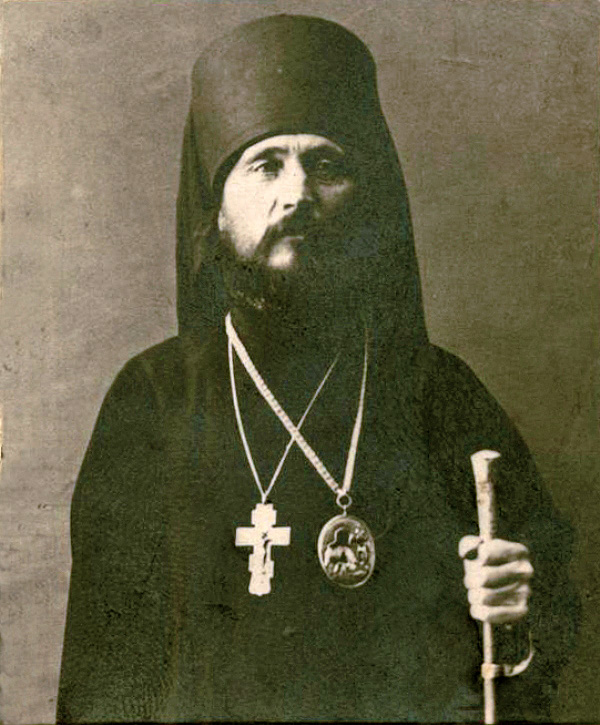
New Hieromartyr Herman (Kokel), Bishop of Alatyr.

New Hieromartyr Zosima Pepenin.

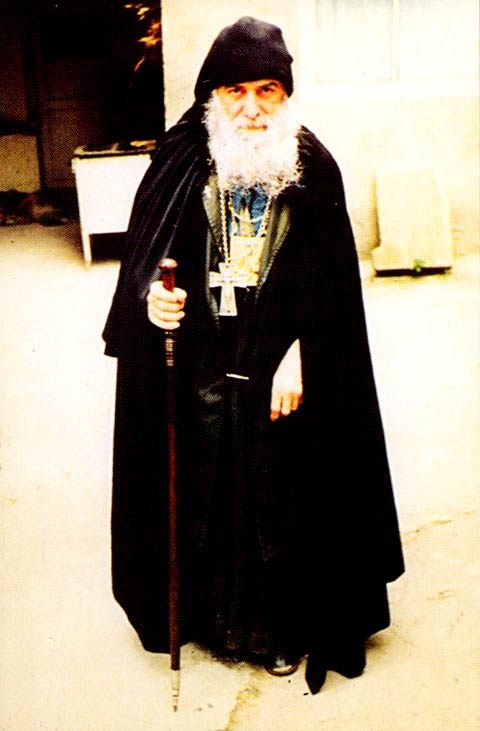
Venerable Gabriel (Urgebadze), Archimandrite of Samtavro Monastery, Georgia.

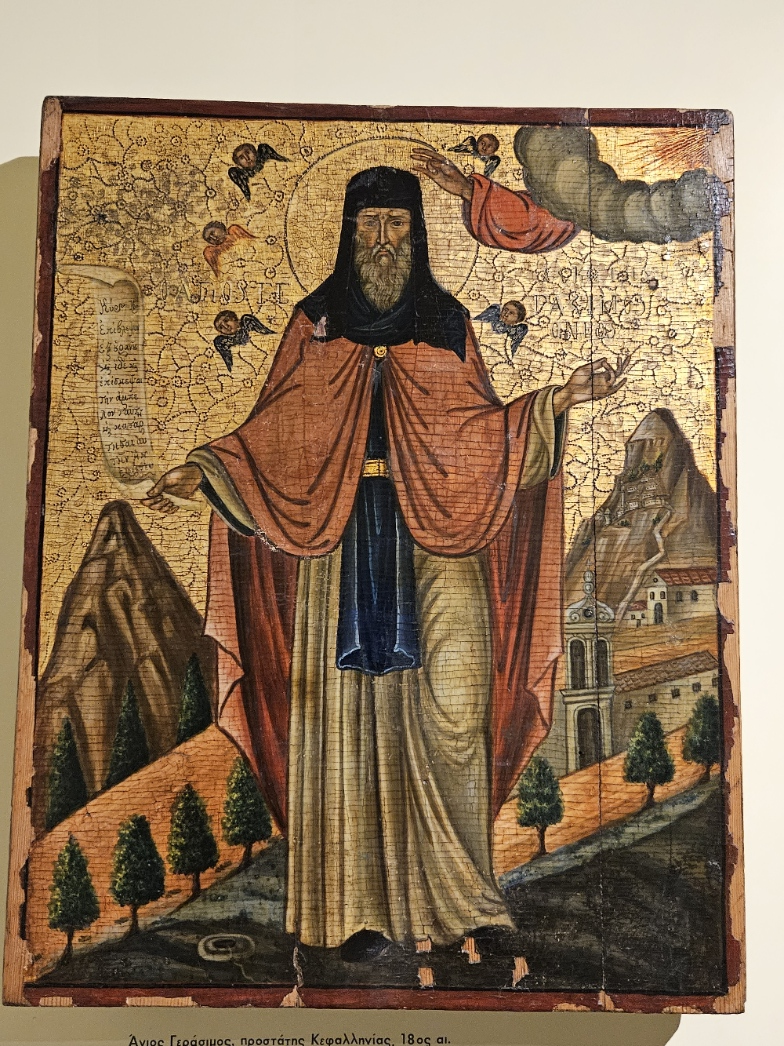
St. Gerasimus of Kefalonia, the New Ascetic.

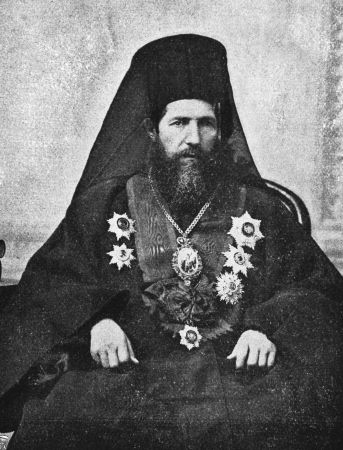
St. Gregory (Kallidis), Metropolitan of Thessalonica and of Heraclea.

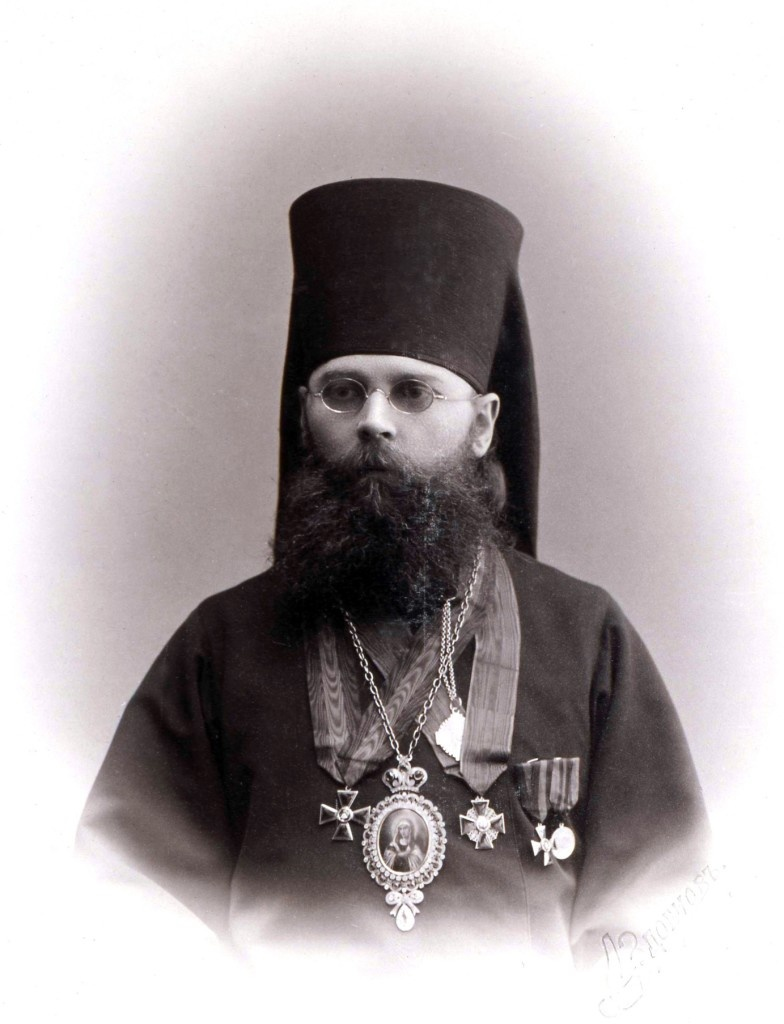
New Hieromartyr Nikodim (Kononov), Bishop of Belgorod.

== Sources ==
- October 20 / November 2. Orthodox Calendar (PRAVOSLAVIE.RU).
- November 2 / October 20. HOLY TRINITY RUSSIAN ORTHODOX CHURCH (A parish of the Patriarchate of Moscow).
- October 20. OCA - The Lives of the Saints.
- The Autonomous Orthodox Metropolia of Western Europe and the Americas (ROCOR). St. Hilarion Calendar of Saints for the year of our Lord 2004. St. Hilarion Press (Austin, TX). p. 78.
- The Twentieth Day of the Month of October. Orthodoxy in China.
- October 20. Latin Saints of the Orthodox Patriarchate of Rome.
- The Roman Martyrology. Transl. by the Archbishop of Baltimore. Last Edition, According to the Copy Printed at Rome in 1914. Revised Edition, with the Imprimatur of His Eminence Cardinal Gibbons. Baltimore: John Murphy Company, 1916. pp. 323–324.
- Rev. Richard Stanton. A Menology of England and Wales, or, Brief Memorials of the Ancient British and English Saints Arranged According to the Calendar, Together with the Martyrs of the 16th and 17th Centuries. London: Burns & Oates, 1892. pp. 507–508.

Greek Sources

- Great Synaxaristes: (in Greek) 20 ΟΚΤΩΒΡΙΟΥ. ΜΕΓΑΣ ΣΥΝΑΞΑΡΙΣΤΗΣ.
- (in Greek) Συναξαριστής. 20 Οκτωβρίου. ECCLESIA.GR. (H ΕΚΚΛΗΣΙΑ ΤΗΣ ΕΛΛΑΔΟΣ).
- (in Greek) 20/10/2017. Ορθόδοξος Συναξαριστής.

Russian Sources

- (in Russian) 2 ноября (20 октября). Православная Энциклопедия под редакцией Патриарха Московского и всея Руси Кирилла (электронная версия). (Orthodox Encyclopedia - Pravenc.ru).
- (in Russian) 20 октября по старому стилю / 2 ноября по новому стилю. Русская Православная Церковь - Православный церковный календарь на 2016 год.
