= Gerasimus of Kefalonia =

Greek Eastern Orthodox saint (1509–1579)

Saint Gerasimos
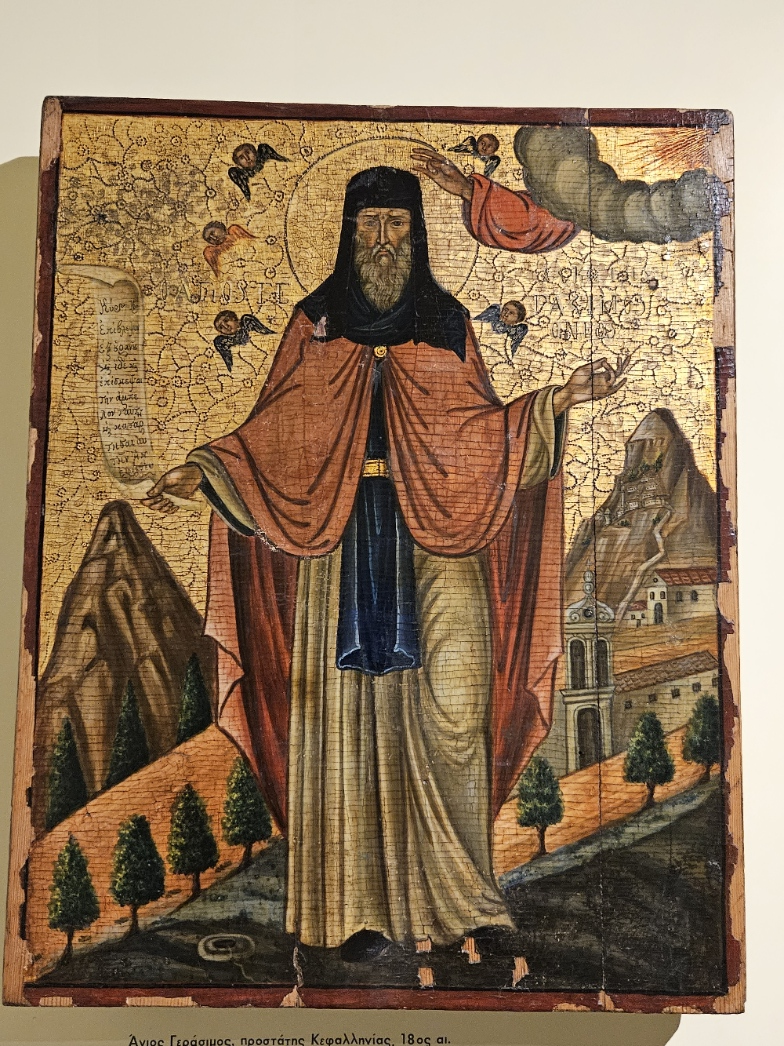

The New Ascetic of Cephalonia
- Born: 1509; Trikala, Corinthia, Greece.
- Died: 15 August 1579; Monastery of the Dormition of the Theotokos ("New Jerusalem"), Valsamata, Cephalonia.
- Venerated in: Eastern Orthodox Church
- Major shrine: Monastery of the Dormition of the Theotokos ("New Jerusalem"), Valsamata, Cephalonia.
- Feast: 16 August (ns) / 29 August (os); 20 October (ns) / 2 November (os) (Translation of relics)

Gerasimos of Kefalonia (Greek: Άγιος Γεράσιμος) is the patron saint of the island of Kefalonia in Greece.

== Life ==
Gerasimos (1506-1579) came from the aristocratic and wealthy Notaras family. He was tonsured a monk at Mount Athos, went to Jerusalem for 12 years, spent some time in Crete and Zakynthos and in 1555 arrived on Kefalonia. He spent his first 5 years in a cave in the area known as Lassi. He subsequently cultivated the area where the monastery of Saint Gerasimos now exists near Valsamata. The monastery which he established cared for the poor and became a center for charity.

== Veneration ==
Saint Gerasimos is believed by natives of Kefalonia to protect them and to also heal them of illness. Many natives of the island name their children after Saint Gerasimos as a tribute to the saint who protects them.

In 1953, immediately after a powerful earthquake on the island of Kefalonia destroyed 90% of the island, there were many claimed sightings of Saint Gerasimos throughout the island who is believed to have comforted and tended to the injured trapped inside homes and buildings.

The body of Saint Gerasimos is at the monastery, made available for veneration as it has never decomposed. After his death, his body was buried twice and exhumed intact, thus leading the church to canonize him as a saint. Kefalonians throughout the world still revere and pray to him.

During the feasts of Saint Gerasimos – August 16th (Note: Since the Feast of the Dormition falls on 15 August, St Gerasimus is commemorated on 16 August.) and 20 October (translation of relics) – his body is passed over ill and sick persons for the purpose of healing them. His body is also displayed by the church during liturgy at the monastery on many occasions.

A church named after Saint Gerasimos was established in New York City by Kefalonians who emigrated to New York in the early 20th century.

== See also ==
- (in Greek) Μονή Αγίου Γερασίμου Κεφαλονιάς. Βικιπαίδεια. (Greek Wikipedia).
- Gerasimus of the Jordan, 5th century saint
- Gerasimus I of Constantinople, 14th century Patriarch
- Gerasimus I of Jerusalem, 19th century Patriarch

== Sources ==
- Venerable Gerasimus the New Ascetic of Cephalonia. OCA - Lives of the Saints.
- Great Synaxaristes: (in Greek) Ὁ Ὅσιος Γεράσιμος ὁ νέος ἀσκητής ὁ ἐν Κεφαλληνίᾳ. 16 Αυγούστου. ΜΕΓΑΣ ΣΥΝΑΞΑΡΙΣΤΗΣ.
