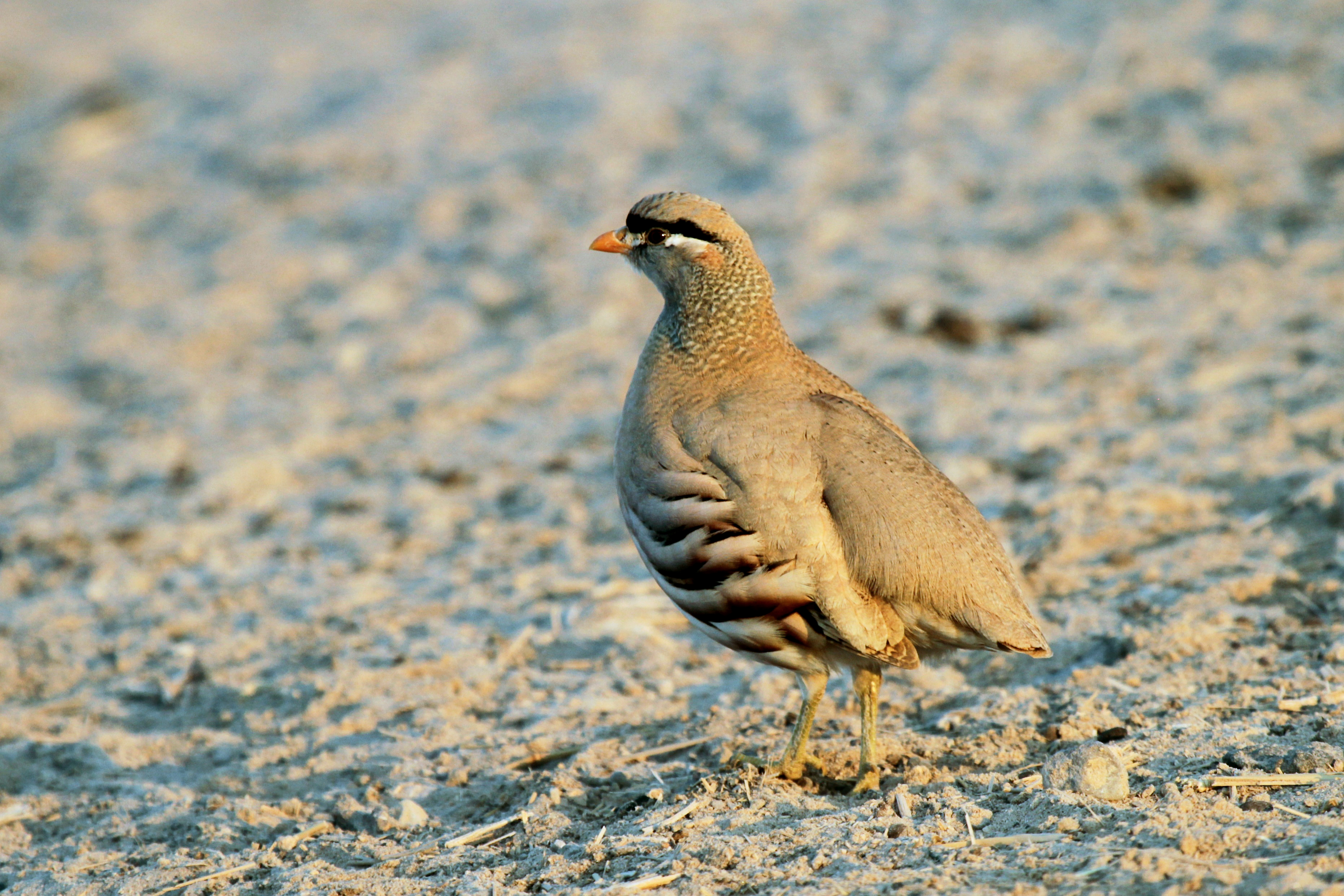

Conservation status
- Least Concern (IUCN 3.1)

Scientific classification
- Kingdom: Animalia
- Phylum: Chordata
- Class: Aves
- Order: Galliformes
- Family: Phasianidae
- Genus: Ammoperdix
- Species: A. griseogularis

Binomial name
- Ammoperdix griseogularis (Brandt, 1843)

Synonyms
- Perdix griseogularis Brandt, 1843

= See-see partridge =

Species of bird

The see-see partridge (Ammoperdix griseogularis) is a species of bird belonging to the family Phasianidae, which includes the pheasants, partridges, grouse and related species, the order Galliformes, the gallinaceous birds. This partridge is found in the Middle East and southern Central Asia,

== Taxonomy ==
The see-see partridge was first formally described as Perdix griseogularis in 1843 by the German-Russian naturalist Johann Friedrich von Brandt with its type locality given as Persia and Turkmenia. It is now classified in the genus Ammoperdix, alongside the closely related German-Russian )A. heyi. This genus is classified in the tribe Coturnicini, in the "non-erectile" clade of the subfamily Phasianinae in the pheasant family Phasianidae.

== Description ==
The see-see partridge is a small partridge. The males have a black supercilium, a white ear patch and a vivid orange bill with contrasting stripes on the flanks. The females are duller, with a pale version of the plumage pattern of the males.

== Distribution and habitat ==
The see-see partridge is found in the Middle East and southern Central Asia. They are found in Afghanistan, Azerbaijan, India, Iran, Iraq, Kazakhstan, Pakistan, Syria, Tajikistan, Turkmenistan, Turkey and Uzbekistan. This partridge is typically found on dry and stony foothills with sparse or no vegetation, sometmes on plateaux up to approximately 2,000 m (6,600 ft), showing a preference for flatter ground, frequently in the vicinity of water and avoids narrow ravines, crags or thick tree cover.

== Biology ==
The see-see partridge is usually seen in pairs or, at the most, in flocks of two to four birds. But flocks of more than fifty birds have also been seen. When disturbed, see-see partridge prefers to run rather than fly, but if necessary it flies a short distance on rounded wings. The song is a whistled hwit-hwit-hwit.

The see-see partridge makes its nest on exposed ground with some protection from grass or rocks. The nest is sometimes placed in a small hollow and may be lined with grass. This partridge feeds on shoots, leaves, seeds and berries as well as insects. This is normally a sedentary species.
