= Gerasimus I of Constantinople =

Ecumenical Patriarch of Constantinople from 1320 to 1321

- Ecumenical Patriarch of Constantinople
- Church: Church of Constantinople
- In office: 21 March 1320 - 20 April 1321
- Predecessor: John XIII of Constantinople
- Successor: Isaias of Constantinople

Personal details
- Born: Philadelphia
- Died: 20 April 1321
- Denomination: Eastern Orthodoxy

Gerasimus I of Constantinople (Greek: Γεράσιμος, romanized: Gerasimos; died 20 April 1321) was the Ecumenical Patriarch of Constantinople from 1320 to 1321.

He was born in Philadelphia and became abbot of the prestigious Mangana Monastery in Constantinople. He was elected as patriarch at an advanced age and died on 20 April 1321.

He became Patriarch during the reign of Emperor Andronikos II Palaiologos; the Emperor found him to be "docile".

== See also ==
- Gerasimus of the Jordan, 5th century saint
- Gerasimus I of Jerusalem, 19th century Patriarch of Jerusalem
- Gerasimus of Kefalonia, patron saint of Kefalonia, Greece

Eastern Orthodox Church titles
Preceded by John XIII	Ecumenical Patriarch of Constantinople; 1320 – 1321	Succeeded by Isaias
