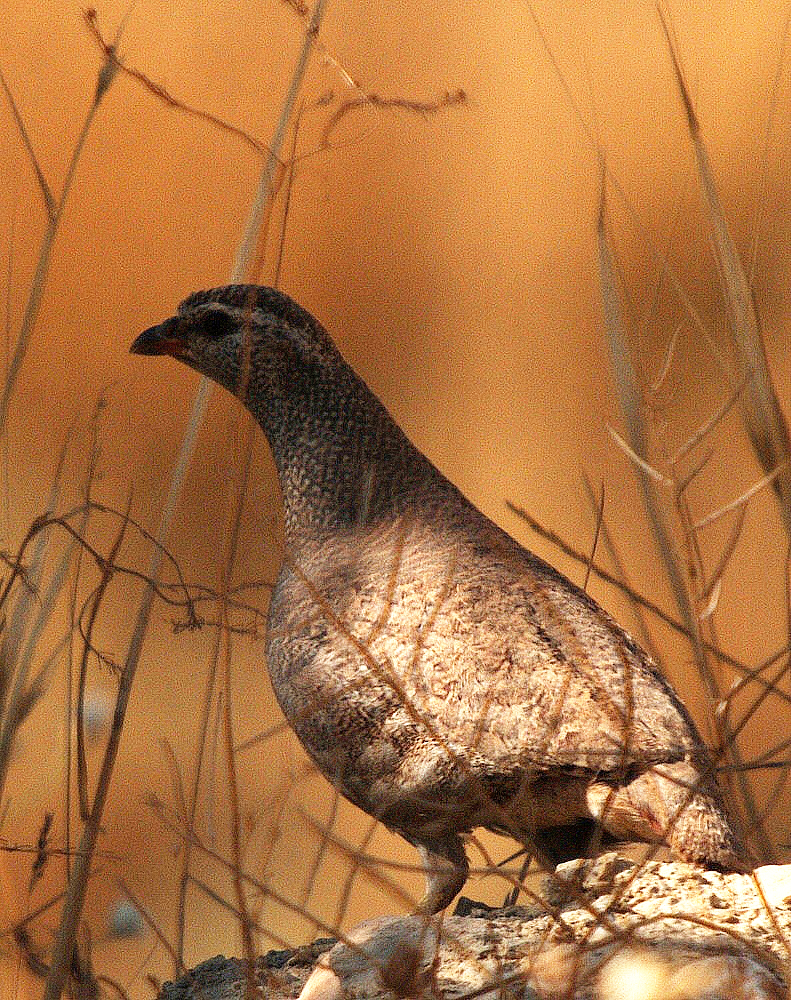
- See-see partridge (A. griseogularis)

Scientific classification
- Kingdom: Animalia
- Phylum: Chordata
- Class: Aves
- Order: Galliformes
- Family: Phasianidae
- Tribe: Coturnicini
- Genus: Ammoperdix; Gould, 1851

Type species
- Perdix heyi Temminck, 1825

Species
- Ammoperdix griseogularis Ammoperdix heyi

= Ammoperdix =

Genus of birds

Ammoperdix is a small genus in the pheasant family Phasianidae of the order Galliformes.

== Description ==
The see-see partridge occurs in southwest Asia, and the sand partridge in Egypt and the Middle East. Both are resident breeders in dry, open country, often in hill areas.

Both partridges in this genus are 22–25 cm (8.7–9.8 in) long, rotund birds. They are mainly sandy brown, with wavy white and brown stripes on their flanks. The males have distinctively-patterned grey heads, but the females are very washed-out in comparison, and this lack of a distinctive head pattern makes it more difficult to distinguish their species.

When disturbed, Ammoperdix partridges prefer to run rather than take to the air, but if necessary they will fly a short distance on rounded wings.

== Species ==
It contains two similar species:

Genus Ammoperdix – Gould, 1851 – two species
| Common name | Scientific name and subspecies | Range | Size and ecology | IUCN status and estimated population |
|---|---|---|---|---|
| See-see partridge | Ammoperdix griseogularis (Brandt, JF, 1843) | southeast Turkey through Syria and Iraq east to Iran and Pakistan | Size: Habitat: Diet: | LC |
| Sand partridge Male Female | Ammoperdix heyi (Temminck, 1825) | southeast Turkey and east to Pakistan | Size: Habitat: Diet: | LC |
