= Deir Hajla =

Monastery in Jericho, West Bank, Palestine

Monastery of Saint Gerasimus Deir Hajla / Deir Hijleh
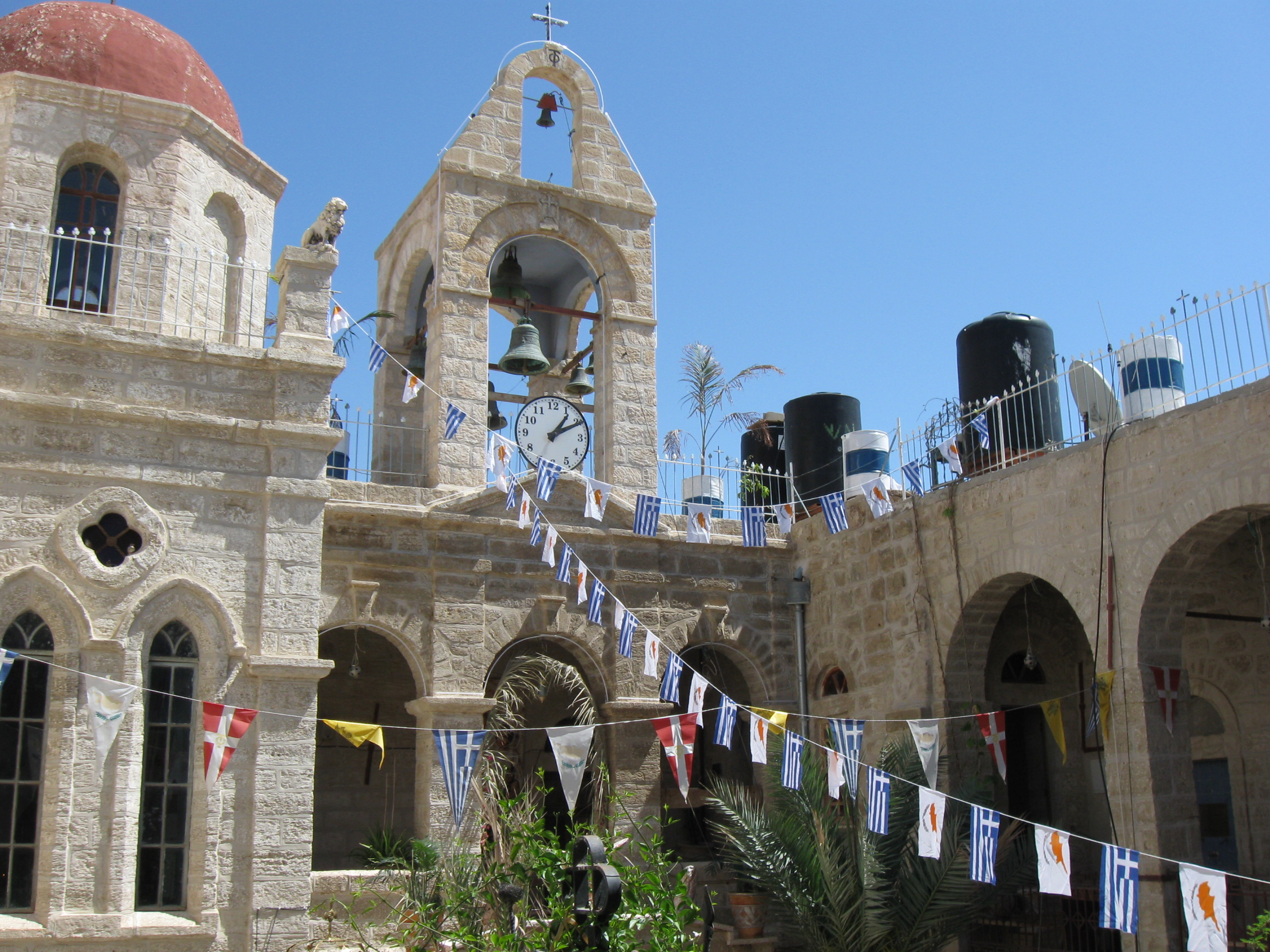
- Monastery of Saint Gerasimus (Deir Hajla)

Religion
- Affiliation: Greek Orthodox Church
- Province: Greek Orthodox Church of Jerusalem
- Ecclesiastical or organisational status: Working
- Year consecrated: c. 455; 1885 (reconsecration)

Location
- Location: Jericho Governorate, West Bank
- Interactive map of Monastery of Saint Gerasimus; Deir Hajla / Deir Hijleh
- Palestine grid: 1976/1365
- Coordinates: 31°49′13″N 35°30′07″E

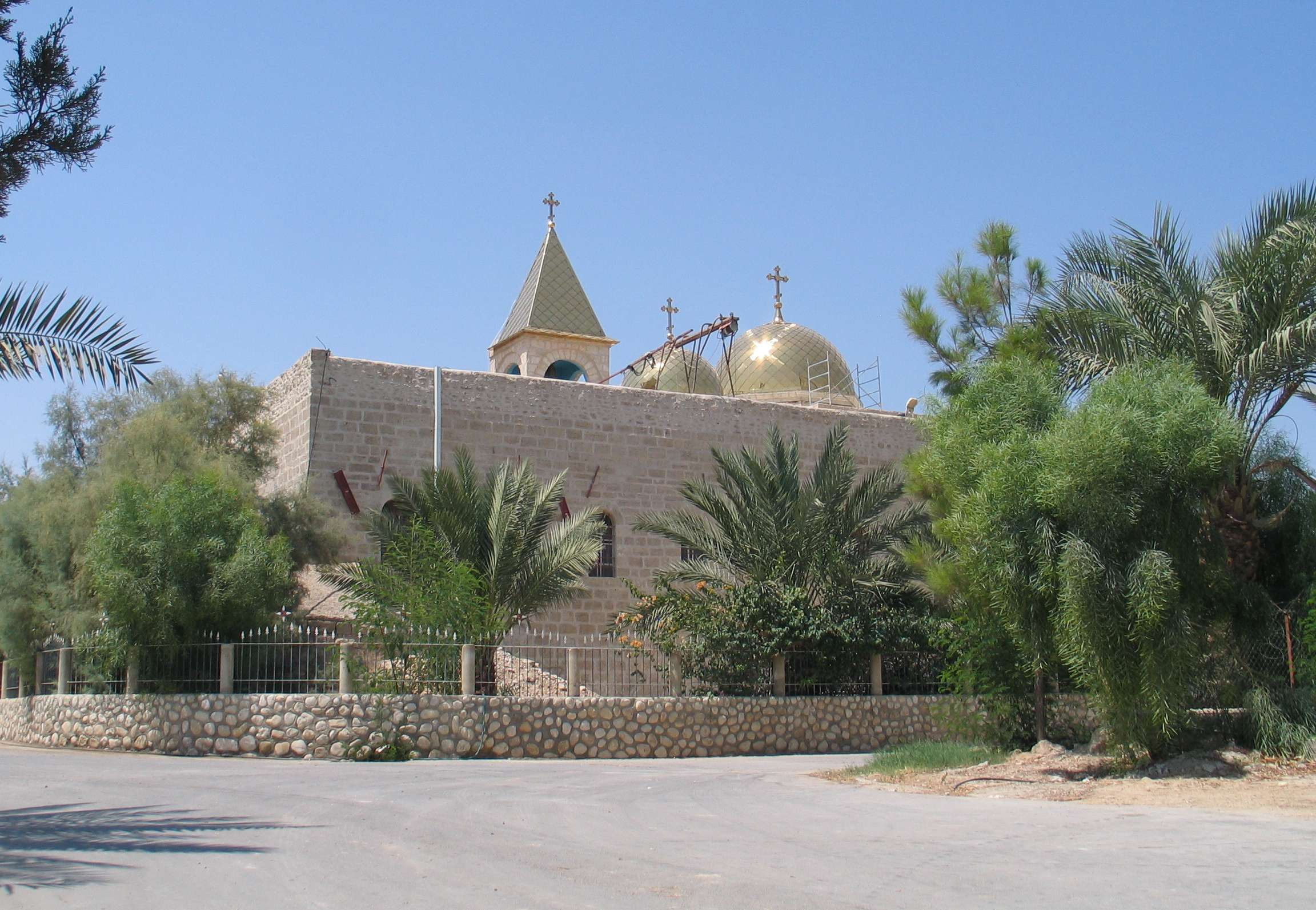
Deir Hajla monastery

Deir Hajla (also spelled Deir Hijleh) or Qasr Hajla is the Arabic name of the Greek Orthodox Monastery of Saint Gerasimus (officially the Holy Monastery of Saint Gerasimos of the Jordan, Greek: Ιερά Μονή Αγίου Γερασίμου του Ιορδανίτη), a monastery located in the Jericho Governorate, West Bank, Palestine, west of the River Jordan and north of the Dead Sea.

== Etymology ==
The current official name of Holy Monastery of Saint Gerasimos of the Jordan connects it with the 5th-century monastic leader who introduced the lavra, or laura type of community among the hermits of the Desert of the Jordan. (The rendering of the saint's name with the suffix -us instead of the original Greek -os is due to the practice of Latinisation of names.) The actual monastery founded by Gerasimus, probably at a site closer to the spring of 'Ein Hajla than the modern monastery, was abandoned towards the end of the 13th century after the final defeat of the Crusaders. The neighboring monastery at the site of Deir Hajla is thought to have inherited its name, itself becoming the "monastery of Gerasimus". A recent publication mentions this name also being used in Arabic, Deir Mar Gerasimus, 'St. Gerasimus Monastery'.

The popular name of 'Deir Hajla' translates from Arabic to 'monastery (deir) of the sand partridge (hajla)', a type of bird often encountered in the region. It echoes, or possibly preserves, the name of the biblical town Bet Hoglah (also spelled Beth-hogla), in the territory of Benjamin on the border to Judah (Joshua 15:6; 18:19, 21), possibly the Bethalaga mentioned by Josephus and Jerome's Bethagla. The nearby spring is called similarly, 'Ein Hajla ('Spring of the Partridge'), and is situated little over a kilometre to the northeast of the modern monastery.

The name Laura of Calamon with several spellings and variations, meaning in Greek 'Laura of the Reed Bush', given due to the reeds growing around the 'Ein Hajla spring, by which it was known in the past, is apparently also inherited from the initial monastery of Gerasimos.

The 19th-century explorers noted that the then-abandoned monastery was sometimes called by local Arabs Qasr Hajlah, 'Castle of Hajlah [Partridge]'.

== Geographic location ==
The modern Monastery of Saint Gerasimus stands 3.5 km west of the River Jordan and close to six km north of the Dead Sea, in a semiarid plain once known as the "Desert of the Jordan".

The "Desert of the Jordan" of the Byzantine sources is a landscape unit distinct from the Judaean Desert, in the plain to the east and south of Jericho. Apart from the Jordan River, its only perennial water source are four springs, the largest and closest one to Deir Hajla being 'Ein Hajla ('Spring of the Partridge'). As of 1979, the date orchards belonging to the monastery were irrigated by the waters issuing from 'Ein Hajla.

Deir Hajla is in the vicinity of Al-Maghtas/Qasr al-Yahud, the traditional site of the baptism of Jesus, a fact that has attracted Christian hermits and pilgrims to the area in the past and again in the modern period.

== Biblical background ==
=== Genesis: the story of Joseph ===
Eusebius, in his Onomasticon (dated to sometime before 324), placed "Halon Atad ... now called Bethagla" at "three milestones from Jericho and about two milestones from the Jordan." The 6th-century Madaba Map, based primarily on the Onomasticon, shows "Alon Alath now Bethagla" (Ancient Greek: Αλων Αταθ ηνυν Βηθαγλα) a little south-east of Jericho.

The decision to erect a monastery at the site may have been related to an early belief that the site marks the spot of the biblical episode mentioned in Genesis 50:10, "And they came to Goren ha-ʻaṭad (lit. 'Threshing-floor of the thorn tree'), which is in trans-Jordan [westward]." Both chariots and horsemen accompanied Joseph and his brothers. "And there they wailed with a very great and sore wailing."

While Epiphanius (4th century) describes the same place as Aṭaṭ, or what is effectually translated as the "threshing floor of the thorn bush," he gives no identification of the site. The 11th-century Jewish biblical exegete Rashi explains the same verse as being a place "encircled by thorns," without identifying the site. However, modern-day historical geographers have identified the place with Deir Hajla.

=== Flight to Egypt ===
A medieval tradition first documented in the 12th century has the Holy Family stopping at this place while fleeing to Egypt.

== Byzantine monasteries in the area ==
=== Actual lavra of Gerasimus ===
Although historical sources are mentioning individual hermits in the desert of the Jordan already in the 4th century, which makes them the first Christian monks in the area (see also Saint Chariton), the founder of the first lavra loosely connecting several hermits into one community was the 5th-century monk Gerasimos (latinised to Gerasimus), later known as Saint Gerasimus. This lavra, or laura, was named after him and he is considered to be the father of monasticism in the wilderness of the Jordan. The sources inform us that the hermits from the laura of Gerasimus lived in isolated, spartan cells spread around the plain, which could be confirmed by archaeological surveys. They only gathered at a central area, the core of the laura, on Saturdays and Sundays. There they had a church, a refectory serviced by a kitchen, areas for storage, and a wing where they could dwell while being away from their cells. In this central area they could enjoy their only hot meals of the week, drink wine, and pray together, before going back to their cells.

=== Byzantine lavras near modern monastery ===
The Laura of Calamon, i.e. the 'Laura of the Reed Bush', which O. Sion sees as distinct from the Laura of Gerasimus, was established around 450, and was named after the reeds which grew at the nearby spring. It has been tentatively identified with a site less than a kilometre northeast of the modern St Gerasimus Monastery, near the spring of 'Ein Hajla.

Another laura, or loose community of hermits, which existed around the site where the modern monastery is standing, was established in c. 455. Archaeological surveys identified a cluster of ancient cells in the immediate vicinity of the modern monastery, eleven in total, which are in their majority located to the east of it, all containing Byzantine-period sherds.<name= Sion/>

=== Other lavras in the area ===
In the 6th century, during the reigns of Anastasius and Justinian, monasteries and hermitages in the "Desert of the Jordan" multiplied. As a result, when the "Life of Gerasimus" was written, the author was able to state that the laura consisted of seventy hermit cells. Modern surveyors even identified a total of ninety in the area, with Ofer Sion suggesting that the saint's vita referred to the entirety of cells spread around in the vicinity of the monastery founded by Gerasimus, which actually belonged to a number of different laura-type communities.

=== Muslim conquest: end of monastic movement ===
The Muslim conquestt around 640 brought to an end the monastic movement in the desert of the Jordan and the Judean desert, in spite of not being any more violent than the Persian conquest of 614, which had no such effect.

=== Lack of Byzantine remains at Deir Hajle ===
Although some 19th-century researchers assumed that the presumably Crusader-time ruins they saw were a continuation of a Byzantine monastery, more recent surveys indicate that the only remains datable to the Byzantine period are clusters of simple hermit cells present in relatively large number near the modern monastery and along the dry riverbed gulches (wadis) north of it, with a few more to the south. The oldest architectural remains of the monastery seen by researchers before the 1872-75 reconstruction are most likely to be dated to the Crusader period (12th-13th century), the same date being valid for the findings of a 1993 survey.

No remains from the Byzantine period were found during surveys at the site of the modern monastery itself, although we know from written sources, as mentioned, that the central area of the ancient lavra contained a church and several more buildings. This led the 1990s surveyor, Ofer Sion of the Israel Antiquities Authority, to suggest that the original laura of Gerasimus stood elsewhere, at one of the surveyed sites closer to the nearby spring of 'Ein Hajla. Of the 14 monasteries in the entire Jericho oasis whose names are known from Byzantine sources, only 4 could be firmly identified with actual archaeological sites, leaving most names yet to be coupled with corresponding monastery sites discovered during modern surveys, which if ever achieved would still leave 3-4 monasteries with no corresponding ruins so far discovered.[8] The last surveyor however noted that no excavation work had been done yet at any of the sites in question at the time of the survey (1993) and its publication (1996).

== Crusader period: first monastery at current site ==
In 1099, the Crusaders occupied the Jericho oasis, to which the "Desert of the Jordan" can be considered to belong. They restored only very few of the many abandoned Byzantine monasteries in the Judean desert and the wilderness of the Jordan, with Deir Hajla being one of them. At the site of the modern monastery, surveys conducted since the 19th century only came up with remains from the Middle Ages.

Early in the 12th century, Abbot Daniel describes the monastery as having protective walls and being inhabited by around 20 monks. He is also the first one to mention a tradition according to which the Holy Family had stopped at this place on its way to Egypt. He calls it the "monastery of the Holy Virgin at Kalamoniya" and mentions a miraculous icon, described later in the same century by John Phokas as resembling the famous Hodegetria of Constantinople. This miracle-working and perfume-emanating icon, held by tradition to have been painted by Luke the Evangelist himself, is now preserved in the chapel of St. Constantine at the Greek Orthodox Patriarchate of Jerusalem. The monastery was restored in the 12th century, under Patriarch John IX, as witnessed by a bilingual inscription found there.

=== Mamluk period ===
An inscription at ad-Dawādāriyya Madrasa in Jerusalem, dated to 1295 CE, gives the income from "the village of Hajla" (French: le village de Hadjlā) to this madrasa; Max van Berchem identifies "the village of Hajla" with Deir Hajla. However, in 1283, a German pilgrim reports of only eight houses in the entire Jericho oasis, at a site probably corresponding to the village of 'Ain Hajla, some 5.7 km from what is now the centre of Jericho.

Denys Pringle writes that about the end of the 13th century, the former Kalamon monastery became known as the 'monastery of St Gerasimus', as the actual one founded by the saint had been abandoned. In the fourteenth century the place is called Bet Agla by Marino Sanuto, while it was known to Catholics as the monastery of St Jerome as early as the fifteenth century, due to a name confusion between Gerasimos and Hieronymos, Greek for Jerome.

=== Ottoman period ===
In 1522 the site was inhabited by monks of the Order of St Basil, a time when the Latins knew it as the convent of Saint Jerome. The monks' presence was possibly only temporary, since at the end of the 15th century and in the first half of the 17th it was in ruins and abandoned. The monastery, after being rebuilt in 1588, was destroyed almost a century and a half later.

=== Crusader ruins in 1870s description ===
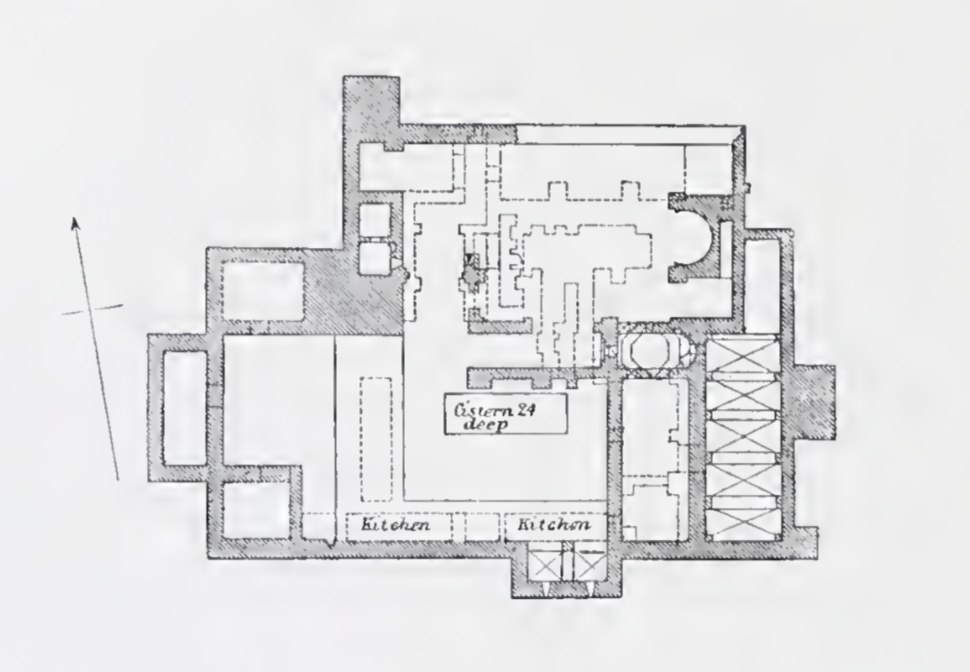
Plan of Deir Hajla in the 1870s, according to SWP.

The PEF's Survey of Western Palestine (SWP) visited Kusr Hajlah in 1873 and 1875, and described it:

"An important ruin of a mediaeval monastery. The ruin included a large chapel, a second smaller to the south, and a third in the vaults below. The whole is surrounded by a wall, which remains almost perfect on three sides, but is destroyed on the north. The total measure north and south is 125 feet, and east and west 163 feet. There is a projecting tower on the south and west walls, and smaller towers on the north and east. The tower on the south projects 9 feet, and was 17 feet wide; that on the west is 14 feet by 35 feet.

Chapel.—The principal chapel has a bearing 99° west. It has an apse with a domed roof on the east, the diameter 12 feet 10 inches, the depth from the chord 8 feet to the back of the curve. On the south side were remains of a staircase leading to the walls above the apse. The second or smaller chapel was more perfect, having a sort of tower or octagonal lantern over the body of the building, supported by groined vaulting forming pendentives, the arches springing from the corners of the building. The chapel measured 9 feet 6 inches across by 14 feet long, interior measure; it had a door 2 feet 5 inches wide on the west, a window 2 feet 8 inches wide on the north, two windows 2 feet broad on the south. On the east was the apse, equal in breadth to the chapel, but having two little apses within it, the northern 5 feet 2 inches diameter, 3 feet deep, the southern 2 feet 5 inches in diameter, and 1 foot 10 inches deep. The total height of the chapel was 16 feet; the lantern above on the interior was a circle 9 feet diameter with four windows; it was 6 feet high to the cornice, making a total 22 feet from the floor. There is a vault 10 feet deep below the chapel.

The main chapel would appear to have had a nave 44 feet long, 14 feet 6 inches broad in clear, and a side aisle on south without an apse, 8 1/2 feet broad in clear, divided off by piers or pillars now destroyed. The arches, judging from the interior piers on the south wall, which show three bays, had a span of 12 feet. A doorway in the central bay of the south wall led to a vestibule west of the smaller chapel, 9 feet 6 inches broad, and 1 7 feet 9 inches long, interior measure. It seems that a corridor measuring 16 feet broad east and west ran behind both chapels on the west, from which they were entered. The northern outer wall of the monastery is traceable near the north-west corner, and shows that there was a northern aisle to the main chapel 12 feet wide.

South of the smaller chapel there is a large cistern or birkeh, which must have formed the principal water supply of the monastery. It measures 30 feet by 10 feet, and is 24 feet deep.

These buildings are supported on vaults at a lower level, as shown in the plan, the birkeh being sunk yet lower than the vaults. The vaults, entered from beneath the southern chapel, include a small chapel, the apse of which, with a cross rudely painted, was beneath the nave of the larger chapel. The kitchens appear to have been near the south wall of the monastery, remains of cooking places being still visible in 1874.

The interior walls of both chapels were painted in fresco, and there appear, as at Deir el Kelt, to be two periods. The floors of both chapels appear to have been covered with marble mosaic."

== Modern monastery (1875) ==
In April 1882, C. R. Conder revisited the site, finding that "the Greek monks from Mar Saba were engaged in building a new monastery on the spot, and had deliberately scraped off all the frescoes." A few fragments survived in the apse of the main (upper floor) church and appear to date to the 15th or 16th century.

The reconstruction was concluded in 1875, giving shape to the monastery as it stands today. The monastery is replete with a surrounding wall, and in the 1970s contained a garden with some of the oldest known specimens of sycamore figs (Ficus sycomorus) found east of the watershed. Portions of a 6th-century mosaic are shown on the site, as well as the remaining structures of an old wall, and frescoes.

== See also ==
- Monastery of Saint Samuel the Confessor

== Bibliography ==
- Berchem, van, M. (1922). MIFAO 43 Matériaux pour un Corpus Inscriptionum Arabicarum Part 2 Syrie du Sud T.1 Jérusalem "Ville" (in French and Arabic). Cairo: Impr. de l'Institut français d'archéologie orientale.
- Burgoyne, Michael Hamilton (1987). Mamluk Jerusalem. British School of Archaeology in Jerusalem by the World of Islam Festival Trust. ISBN 090503533X.
- Conder, C.R.; Kitchener, H.H. (1883). The Survey of Western Palestine: Memoirs of the Topography, Orography, Hydrography, and Archaeology. Vol. 3. London: Committee of the Palestine Exploration Fund. (p. 178)
- Dauphin, C. (1998). La Palestine byzantine, Peuplement et Populations. BAR International Series 726 (in French). Vol. III : Catalogue. Oxford: Archeopress. ISBN 0-860549-05-4. (p. 897)
- Guérin, V. (1874). Description Géographique Historique et Archéologique de la Palestine (in French). Vol. 2: Samarie, pt. 1. Paris: L'Imprimerie Nationale. (p. 52 ff)
- Marti, Karl; Schick, C (1880). "Mitteilungen von Bauart C. Schick in Jerusalem über die alten Lauren und Klöster in der Wüste Juda". Zeitschrift des Deutschen Palästina-Vereins. 3: 1–43. (Marti and Schick, 1880, pp. 14-15)
- Maundrell, H. (1703). A Journey from Aleppo to Jerusalem: At Easter, A. D. 1697. Oxford: Printed at the Theatre. (p. 84)
- Palmer, E. H. (1881). The Survey of Western Palestine: Arabic and English Name Lists Collected During the Survey by Lieutenants Conder and Kitchener, R. E. Transliterated and Explained by E.H. Palmer. Committee of the Palestine Exploration Fund.
- Pringle, D. (1993). The Churches of the Crusader Kingdom of Jerusalem: A-K (excluding Acre and Jerusalem). Vol. I. Cambridge University Press. ISBN 0-521-39036-2.
- Robinson, E.; Smith, E. (1841). Biblical Researches in Palestine, Mount Sinai and Arabia Petraea: A Journal of Travels in the year 1838. Vol. 2. Boston: Crocker & Brewster.
- Sharon, M. (2004). Corpus Inscriptionum Arabicarum Palaestinae, D-F. Vol. 3. BRILL. ISBN 90-04-13197-3. (pp. 48 -54)
- Tristram, H.B. (1865). Land of Israel, A Journal of travel in Palestine, undertaken with special reference to its physical character. London: Society for Promoting Christian Knowledge. (p. 221)
