= Isaias of Constantinople =

Ecumenical Patriarch of Constantinople from 1323 to 1332

- Ecumenical Patriarch of Constantinople
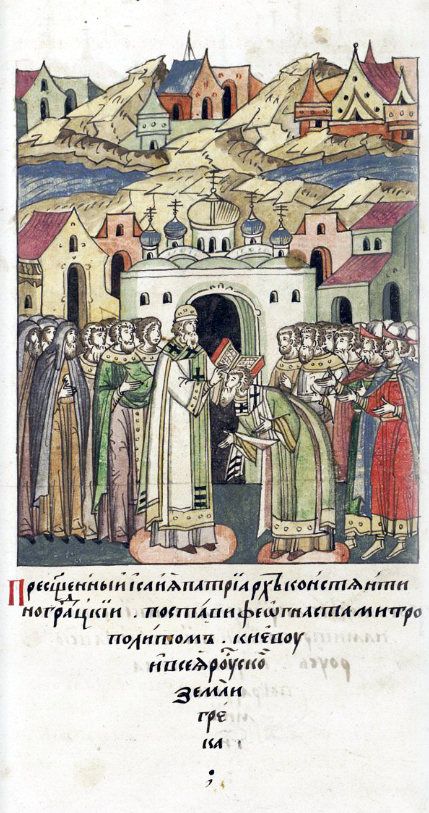
- Isaias and Theognostus of Kiev, miniature from the Illustrated Chronicle of Ivan the Terrible (16th century)
- Church: Church of Constantinople
- In office: 11 November 1323 – December 1327; 24 May 1328 – 13 May 1332
- Predecessor: Gerasimus I of Constantinople
- Successor: John XIV of Constantinople

Personal details
- Died: 13 May 1332
- Denomination: Eastern Orthodoxy

Isaias of Constantinople (sometimes spelled Esaias, Jeaias or Jesaias; Greek: Ἠσαΐας; died 13 May 1332) was the Ecumenical Patriarch of Constantinople from 1323 to 1332.

The Byzantine Emperor Andronikos II Palaiologos had Isaias confined to the monastery section of the Magnaura school in Constantinople in 1327, possibly due to the Patriarch's support for the emperor's grandson, Andronikos III Palaiologos during the civil war of 1321–1328. Upon the overthrow of Andronikos II by his grandson on 24 May 1328, a delegation was sent to the monastery to retrieve Isaias. On his way back to the palace, Isaias was escorted not by the usual ecclesiastics, but by a troupe of musicians, dancing girls and comedians, one of whom had him so helpless with laughter that he almost fell off his horse.

== Notes and references ==
Eastern Orthodox Church titles
Preceded by Gerasimus I	Ecumenical Patriarch of Constantinople; 1323 – 1332	Succeeded by John XIV
