= Sindulf of Rheims =

Saint Sindulf of Rheims
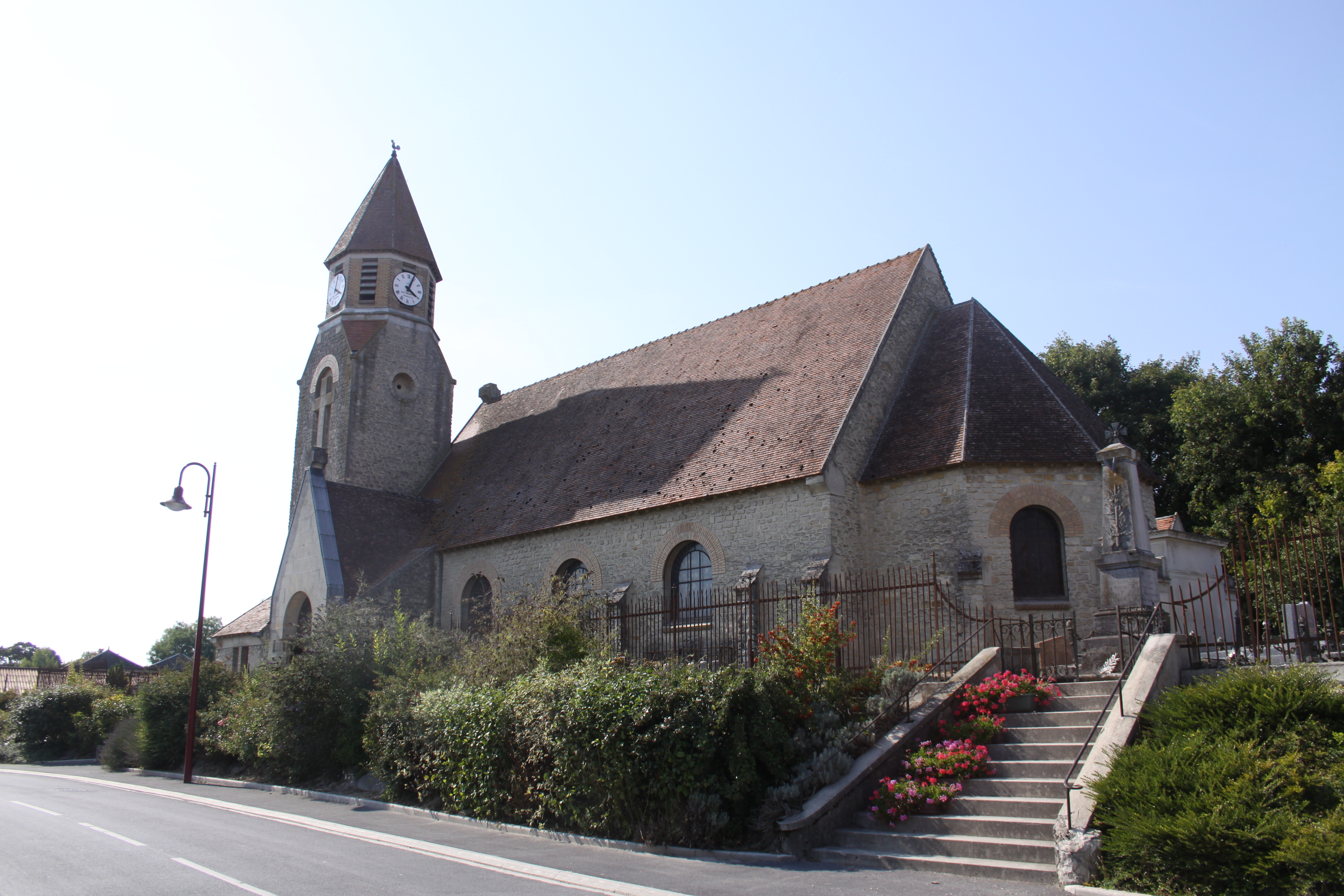
- Église Saint-Sindulphe in Aussonce
- Born: Aquitaine
- Residence: Aussonce, near Reims, France
- Died: 7th century
- Feast: 20 October

Saint Sindulf of Rheims (or Sindulphus, Sindulphe, Sandou, Sendou; died c. 660) was a hermit who lived near Reims. His feast day is 20 October.

== Monks of Ramsgate account ==
The monks of St Augustine's Abbey, Ramsgate, wrote in their Book of Saints (1921),

Sindulphus (St.) (Oct. 20)
(7th century) A native of the South of France, who lived a holy and incredibly austere life as a hermit at Aussonce in the neighbourhood of Rheims. Two hundred years after his death, Bishop Hincmar built a noble shrine for his remains.

== Butler's account ==
The hagiographer Alban Butler (1710–1773) wrote in his Lives of the Fathers, Martyrs, and Other Principal Saints, under October 20,

St. Sindulphus, Priest of Rheims, commonly called St. Sendou. Inflamed with a desire to aim at perfection he left Aquitain, his native country, and sought for a retreat in the diocess of Rheims, about the beginning of the seventh century. He chose for his residence the village of Aussonce, four leagues from Rheims, where he joined assiduous prayer to the greatest austerities. He was eminent for his knowledge of the scriptures, and for instructing all those who came to consult him. He died before the middle of the seventh century, on the 20th of October, and was buried in the place of his retirement; but his relics were removed in the ninth century to the abbey of Hautevilliers, near Rheims. He is mentioned this day in the Roman Martyrology. See Mabill. Act. SS. t. 1, and part. 2, sec. 4.

== Sources ==
- Butler, Alban (1798), The Lives of the Primitive Fathers, Martyrs, and Other Principal Saints, vol. X, J. Moir This article incorporates text from this source, which is in the public domain.
- St. Augustine's Abbey, Ramsgate (1921), The Book of saints : a dictionary of servants of God canonized by the Catholic Church, London: A. & C. Black, ltd. This article incorporates text from this source, which is in the public domain.
