= Saint Gerasimos Monastery =

Historic building on Cephalonia, Greece

- Μονή Αγίου Γερασίμου Κεφαλονιάς
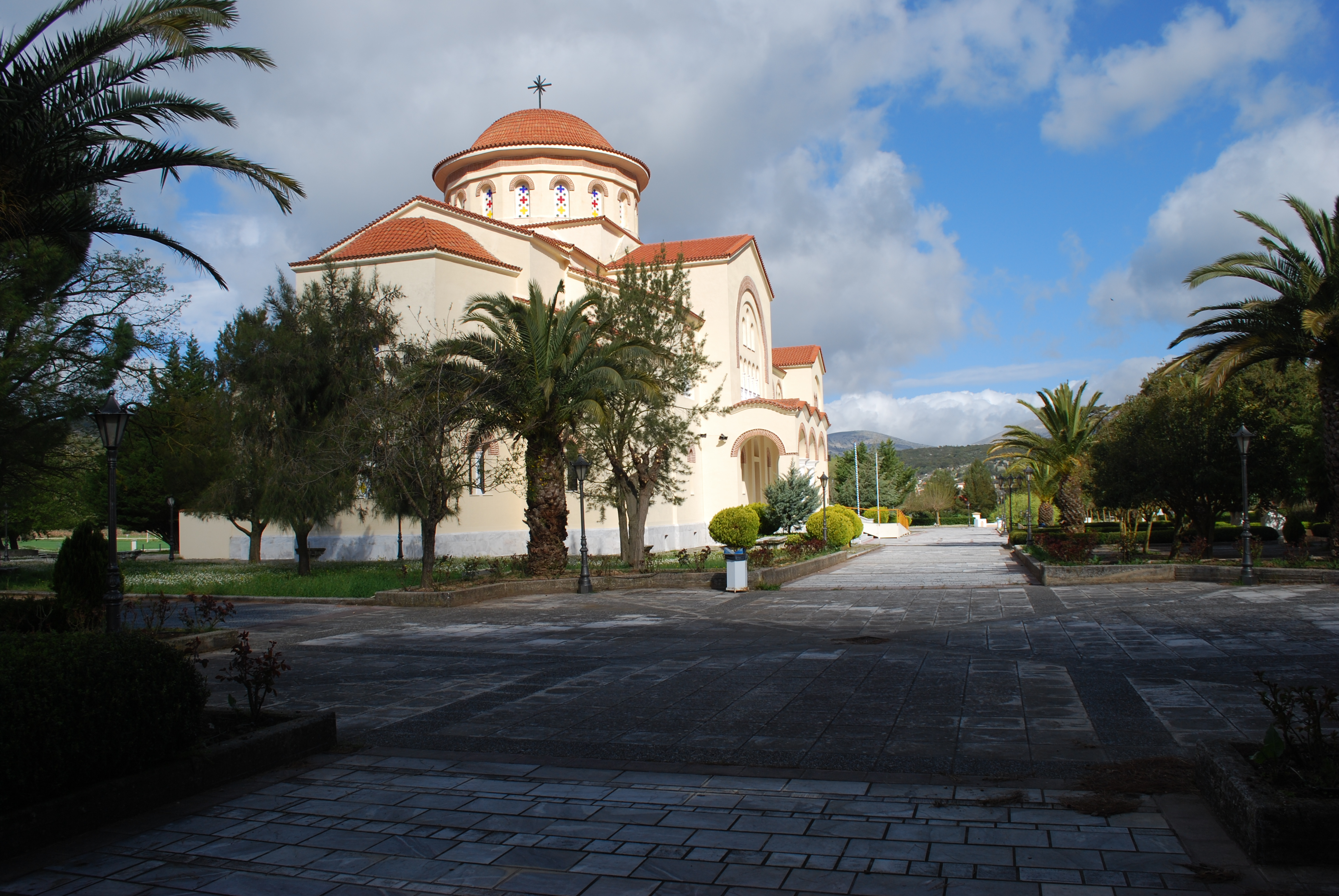
- Interactive map of Saint Gerasimos Monastery

Monastery information
- Established: 1560
- Dedicated to: Dormition of Theotokos
- Celebration date: August 16
- Diocese: Metropolis of Kefalonia

Site
- Location: Michata, Kefalonia
- Country: Greece
- Coordinates: 38°09′57″N 20°35′19″E

The Monastery Saint Gerasimos of Kefalonia (Greek: Μονή Αγίου Γερασίμου Κεφαλονιάς) is located at the foot of Mount Ainos, built on top of an old monastery from the year 1200 (era of the Crusades), near the village of Fragata.

The monastery is dedicated to the Dormition of the Virgin Mary and has been named by the residents of the village of Valsamata as "New Jerusalem". The monastery and its surroundings were granted by the Priest George Valsamos to Saint Gerasimos, who settled there in 1560. After living "in caves and the caves of the earth" (Heb. 1a' 38), he died on August 15, 1579.

Saint Gerasimos is the patron saint of Kefalonia and his relic is kept in the monastery, in a silver urn. Saint Gerasimos was a monk from Trikala in Corinth and founded the monastery in the 16th century, renovating an older one, which was dedicated to the Virgin Mary. Saint Gerasimos died in 1579 and was canonized in 1622.

In the Monastery of Saint Gerasimos there is also his hermitage, which can be visited nowadays. Also, in the Monastery, the shroud of the Saint is kept.

== The hermitage of Saint Gerasimos ==
The Hermitage of Saint Gerasimos is located in the area of Spilia Argostoli, where he built a nunnery called New Jerusalem in the location of Omala in Kefallinia, where he became a monk.

The Hermitage of Saint Gerasimos is located inside the temple: it is a very narrow passage that leads through an almost vertical iron staircase three meters long to an underground space which is separated by a narrow opening into "two rooms". In the grounds of the Monastery, the three large plane trees planted by the Saint himself are still preserved, as well as the three wells he dug with his own hands, according to tradition.

It is divided into two spaces ΄΄apartments΄΄ that communicate with a square hole in the floor 30*40 cm. The first apartment has the shape of an almost arc whose straight side is 5m. length. The second is a 2*5 rectangle. There are dirt and rocks on the floor. The sides are stone-built and end in the vaulted stone-built roof.

The walls are plastered up to the beginning of the roof with kurasan or lime. It is also noteworthy that although visitors-pilgrims need to kneel while in the hermitage, they are not soiled by the muddy floor.
