= Gerasimus of the Jordan =

Christian saint and monk (died 475)

Saint Gerasimus of the Jordan
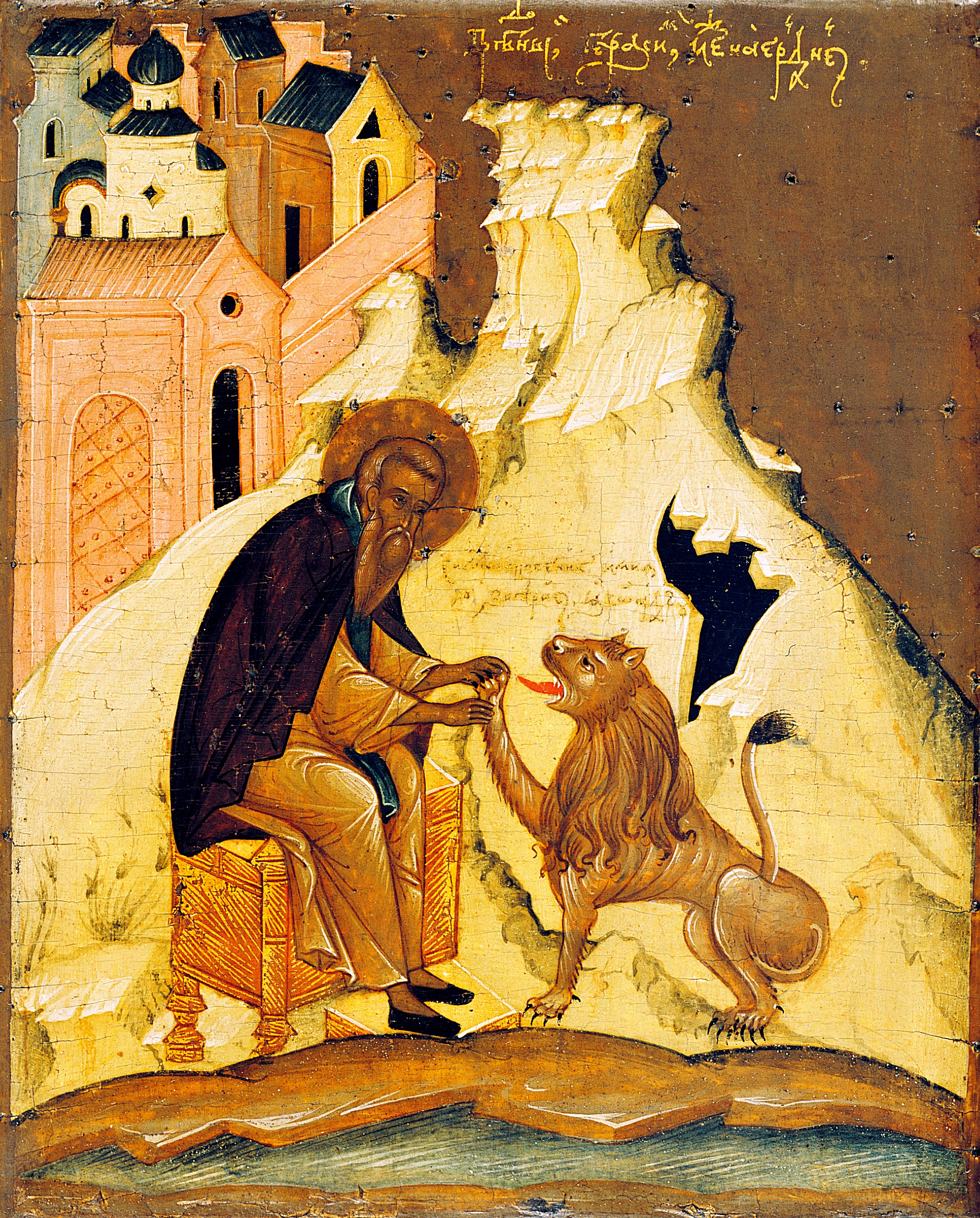
- St. Gerasimus of the Jordan and the lion. Russian Icon of 16th century.

Abbot, Monk, Ascetic
- Born: Early 5th century Lycia, Cappadocia, Eastern Roman Empire
- Died: 475; Monastery of St. Gerasimus
- Venerated in: Eastern Orthodox Church; Roman Catholic Church
- Feast: 5 March (Roman Catholic Church); 4 March (Eastern Orthodox Church).
- Attributes: Taming a lion

Gerasimus of the Jordan (Greek: Γεράσιμος Ἰορδανίτης, Abba Gerasimus, Holy Righteous Father Gerasimus of Jordan—also spelled Gerasimos or Gerasim) was a Christian saint, monk and abbot of the 5th century AD.

== Biography ==
Gerasimus was born into a wealthy family in the province of Lycia, the southern part of Asia Minor, but he left his family wealth and worldly affairs to become a monk. He departed for the region Thebaid in the Egyptian desert, later again returning to his native Lycia. About the middle of 5th century Saint Gerasimus went to Palestine and settled in the wilderness near the Jordan River. There he established a monastery and became known for his righteous life of asceticism and prayer. He is reputed to have attended to the Fourth Ecumenical Council at Chalcedon in 451.

The anecdote of Gerasimus and the lion, when the saint tamed the animal by removing a thorn from its paw and taught it obedience, became widely known in the Christian world. A parallel tale is preserved about St. Jerome, but, as has been argued, the tale of Jerome may have derived from a confusion with the exploits of Gerasimus, as Jerome in later Latin is "Geronimus".

Saint Gerasimus of the Jordan died in 475 (or, by other accounts, 451). His feast day is celebrated on 4 March by the Eastern Orthodox Church and on 5 March by the Roman Catholic Church.

== Monastery of St. Gerasimus ==
The Greek Orthodox monastery of Deir Hajla near Jericho commemorates St. Gerasimus, whose lavra was nearby.

The history of the monastery is also linked to another Christian narrative. The Holy Family were said to have found refuge in a cave here during their flight from Herod the Great. An underground chapel was built on the spot where the Holy Family is believed to have spent the night.

== Hymns ==
- Troparion - Tone 1

Dweller of the desert and angel in the body, / you were shown to be a wonderworker, our God-bearing Father Gerasimus. / You received heavenly gifts through fasting, vigil, and prayer: / healing the sick and the souls of those drawn to you by faith. / Glory to Him who gave you strength! / Glory to Him who granted you a crown! / Glory to Him who through you grants healing to all!

- Kontakion - Tone 4

Father, you burned with heavenly love, / preferring the harshness of the Jordan desert to all the delights of the world. / Therefore, a wild beast served you until your death; he died in obedience / in grief on your grave. / Thus God has glorified you, / and when you pray to Him / remember us, Father Gerasimus.

== See also ==
- Androcles
- Gerasimus I of Constantinople, 14th century Patriarch
- Gerasimus I of Jerusalem, 19th century Patriarch
