= Aussonce =

- Commune
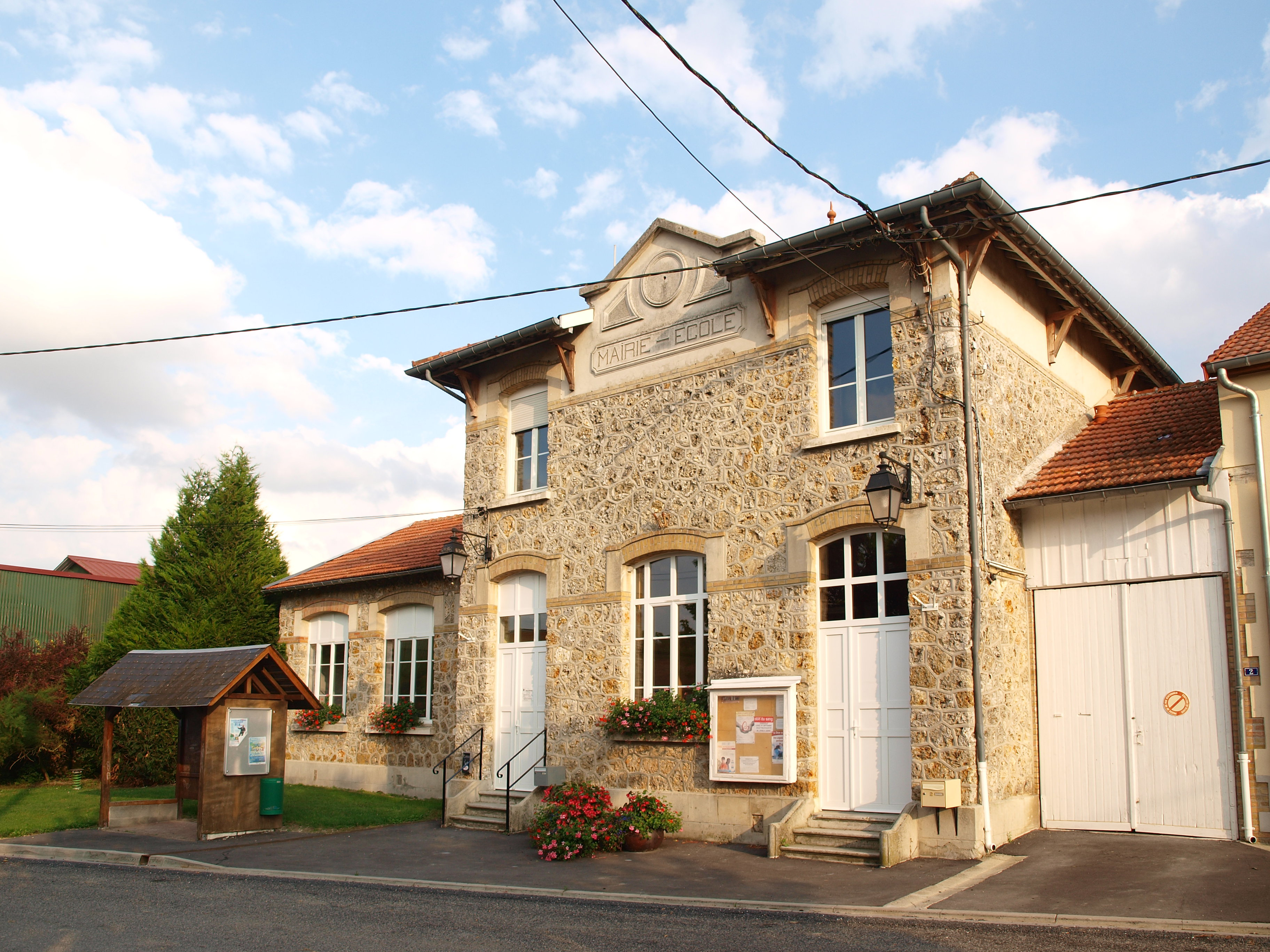
- Aussonce Town Hall

- Coat of arms
- Location of Aussonce
- Location within France Location within Grand Est
- Coordinates: 49°21′02″N 4°19′24″E
- Country: France
- Region: Grand Est
- Department: Ardennes
- Arrondissement: Rethel
- Canton: Château-Porcien
- Intercommunality: CC Pays Rethélois

Government
  - Mayor (2020–2026): Bruno Ponsin
- Area^{1}: 19.14 km^{2} (7.39 sq mi)
- Elevation: 86 m (282 ft)
- Highest elevation: 170 m (560 ft)
- Lowest elevation: 94 m (308 ft)
- Population (2023): 236
  - Density: 12.3/km^{2} (31.9/sq mi)
- Time zone: UTC+01:00 (CET)
  - Summer (DST): UTC+02:00 (CEST)
- INSEE/Postal code: 08032 /08310
- ^{1} French Land Register data, which excludes lakes, ponds, glaciers > 1 km^{2} (0.386 sq mi or 247 acres) and river estuaries.

Aussonce (French pronunciation: [osɔ̃s]) is a commune in the Ardennes department in the Grand Est region of north-eastern France.

== Geography ==
Aussonce is located some 30 km north-east of Reims and 25 km south of Rethel. The western border of the commune is the departmental border between Ardennes and Marne. Access to the commune is by the D25 road from La Neuville-en-Tourne-à-Fuy in the east which passes through the village then continues west to Heutrégiville, changing to the D33 at the border. The D985 from La Neuville-en-Tourne-à-Fuy to Pontfaverger-Moronvilliers passes through the south-east of the commune. The D15 goes north-west from the village to Ménil-Lépinois. The commune consists entirely of flat farmland.

The Ruisseau d'Aussonce rises near the village and flows west to join the Suippe at Vaudetre.

== History ==
The hermit Saint Sindulf of Rheims is said to have lived in Aussonce in the 7th century.

In the Aussonce church bell tower there is the following inscription: "On 3 April 1650 the battle of Aussonce took place between the Germans and locals. It lasted from 9 in the morning until 7 in the evening. The people were beaten and forced to flee. Fire was set in the village and there remained a few houses and four barns".

== Administration ==
List of Successive Mayors

| From | To | Name |
|---|---|---|
| 1857 | 1875 | Jules Frérot |
| 1879 | 1885 | Clovis Beauvais |
| 1893 | 1914 | Henri Concet |
| | 2001 | Germain Hainguerlot |
| 2001 | 2008 | Michel Peze |
| 2008 | 2015 | Gilles Preaux |
| 2015 | current | Bruno Ponsin |

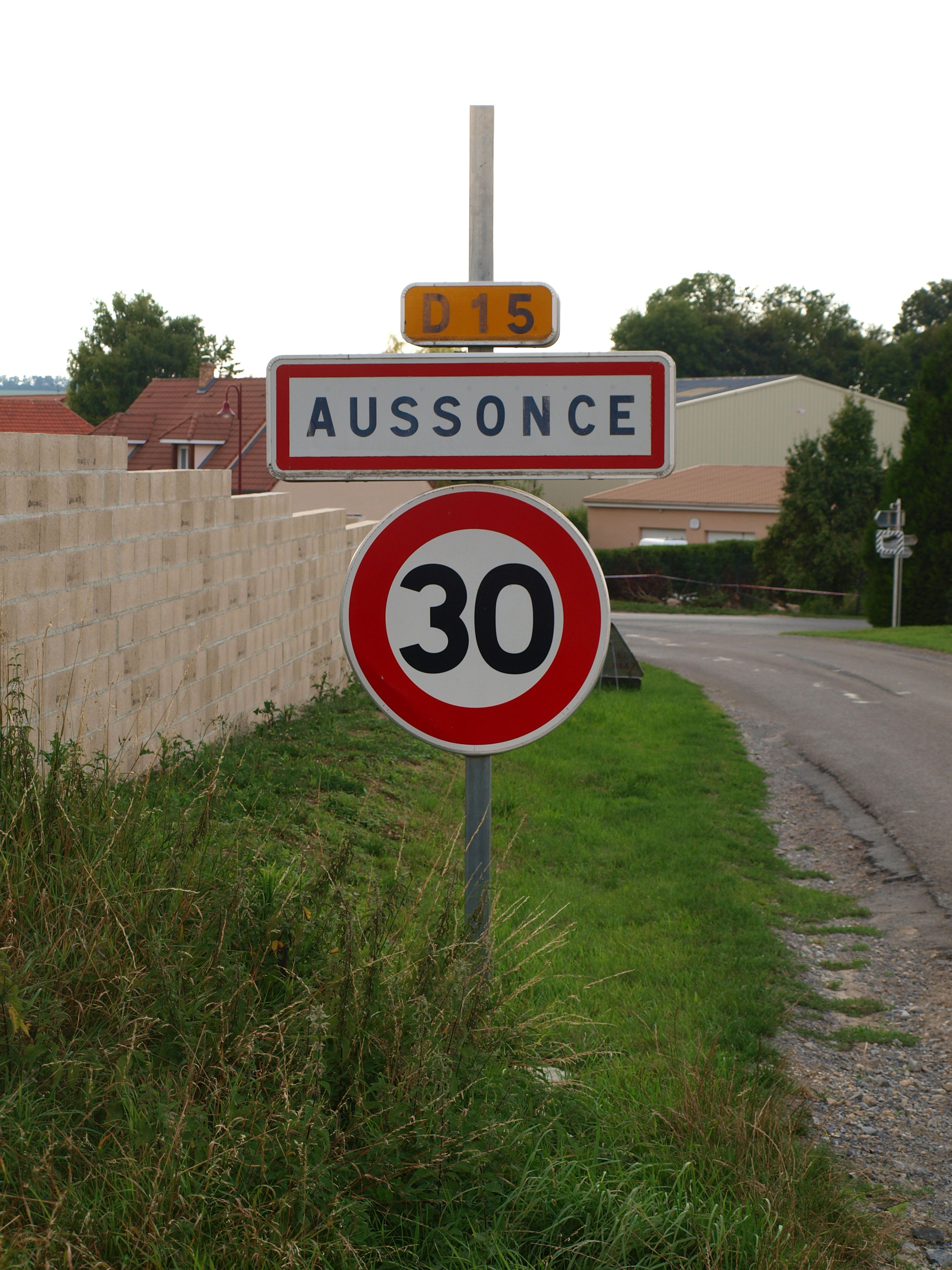
The entrance to the village

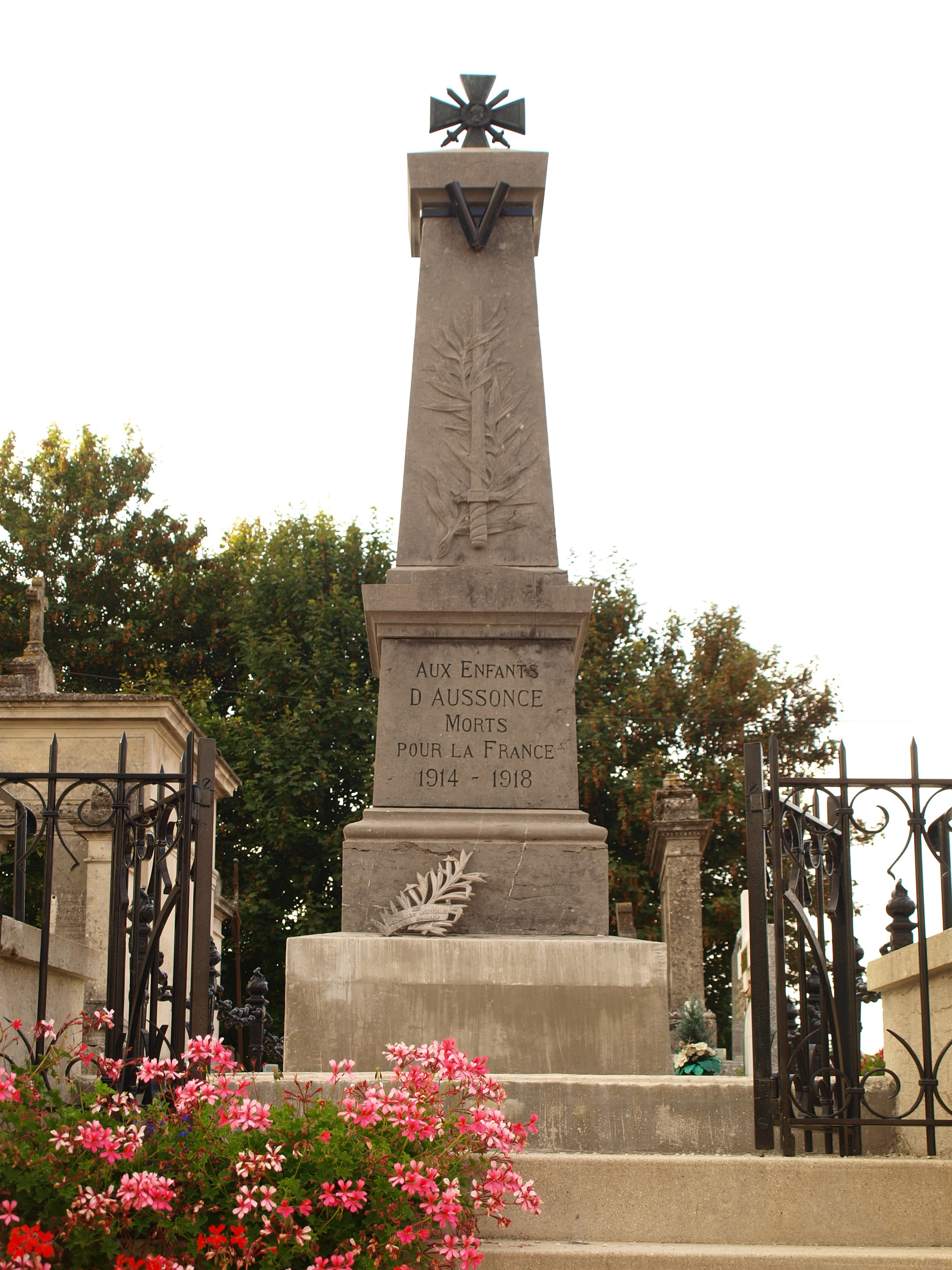
The War Memorial

== Demography ==
The inhabitants of the commune are known as Alsontains or Alsontaines in French.

Historical population

| Year | Pop. | ±% p.a. |
|---|---|---|
| 1793 | 406 | — |
| 1821 | 407 | +0.01% |
| 1846 | 465 | +0.53% |
| 1872 | 428 | −0.32% |
| 1901 | 289 | −1.34% |
| 1926 | 207 | −1.33% |
| 1946 | 194 | −0.32% |
| 1962 | 209 | +0.47% |
| 1968 | 195 | −1.15% |

| Year | Pop. | ±% p.a. |
|---|---|---|
| 1975 | 145 | −4.14% |
| 1982 | 136 | −0.91% |
| 1990 | 138 | +0.18% |
| 1999 | 157 | +1.44% |
| 2007 | 165 | +0.62% |
| 2012 | 195 | +3.40% |
| 2017 | 215 | +1.97% |
| 2023 | 236 | +1.57% |

Source: EHESS and INSEE

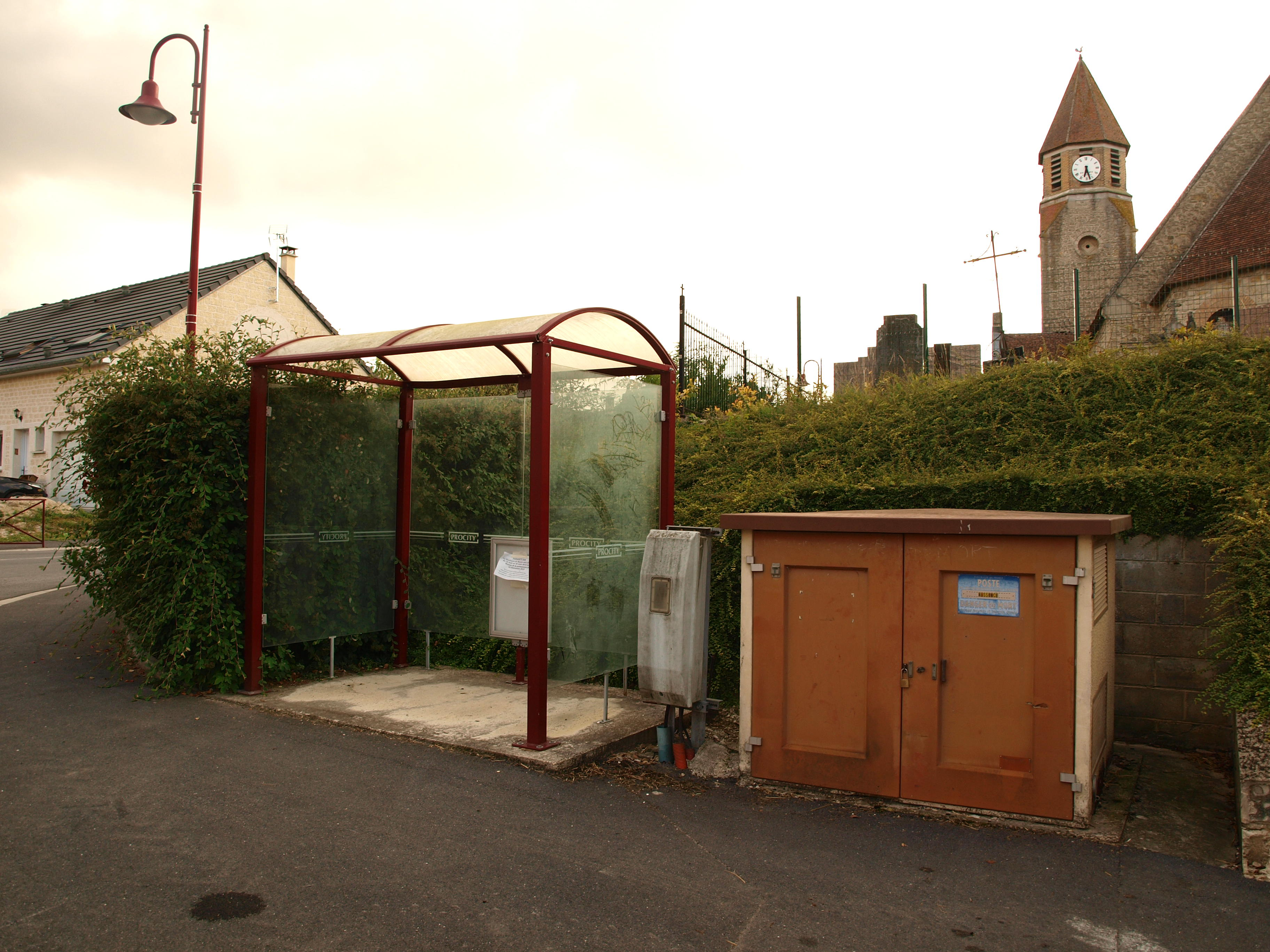
The Bus stop

== Sites and Monuments ==
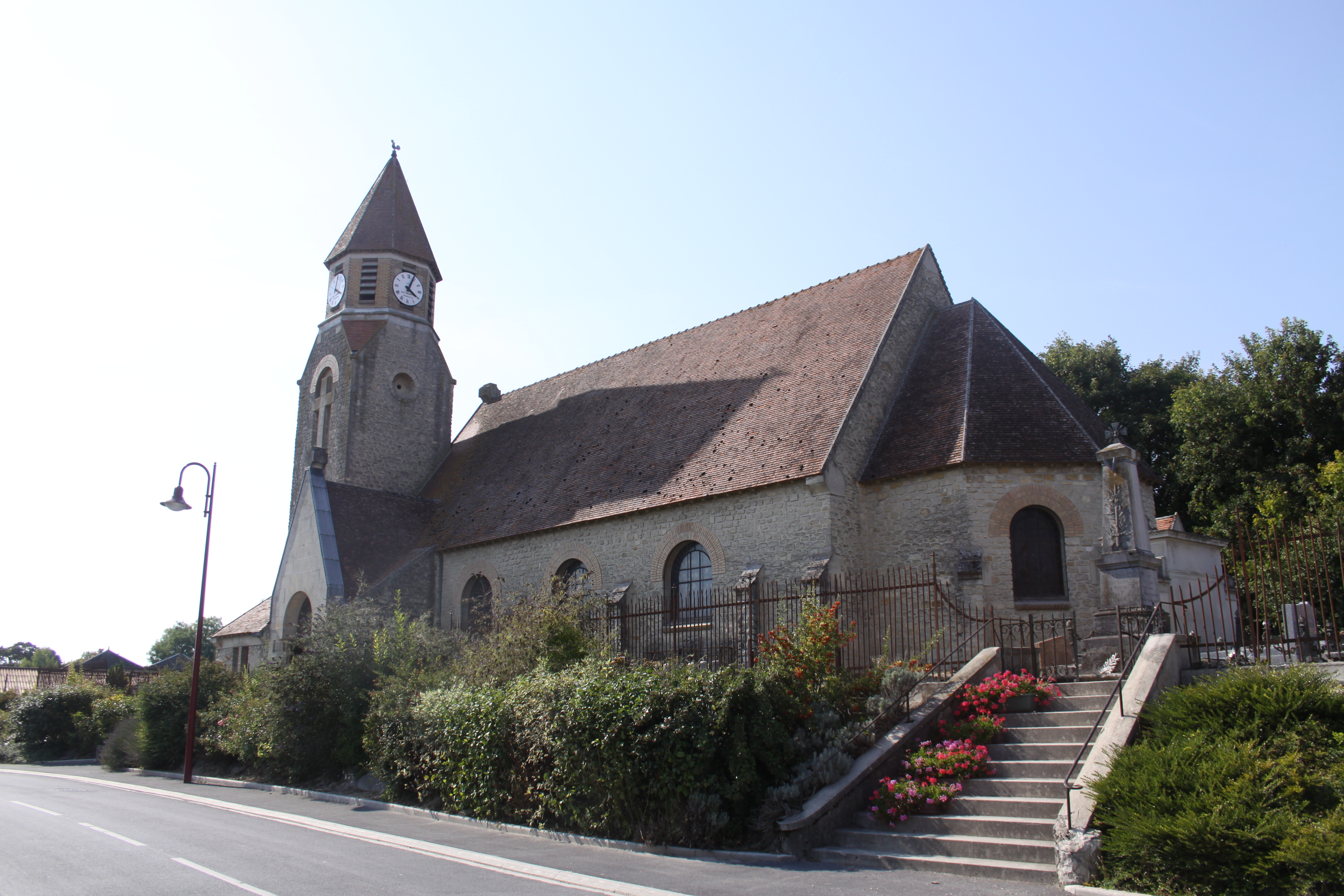
The Chapel Saint Sindulphe

- The Chapel Saint Sindulphe: at the foot of the chapel is the source of a stream called le Relais which flows towards Marne department across "les Marais" (The Marshes) to join the Suippe in Heutrégiville commune.

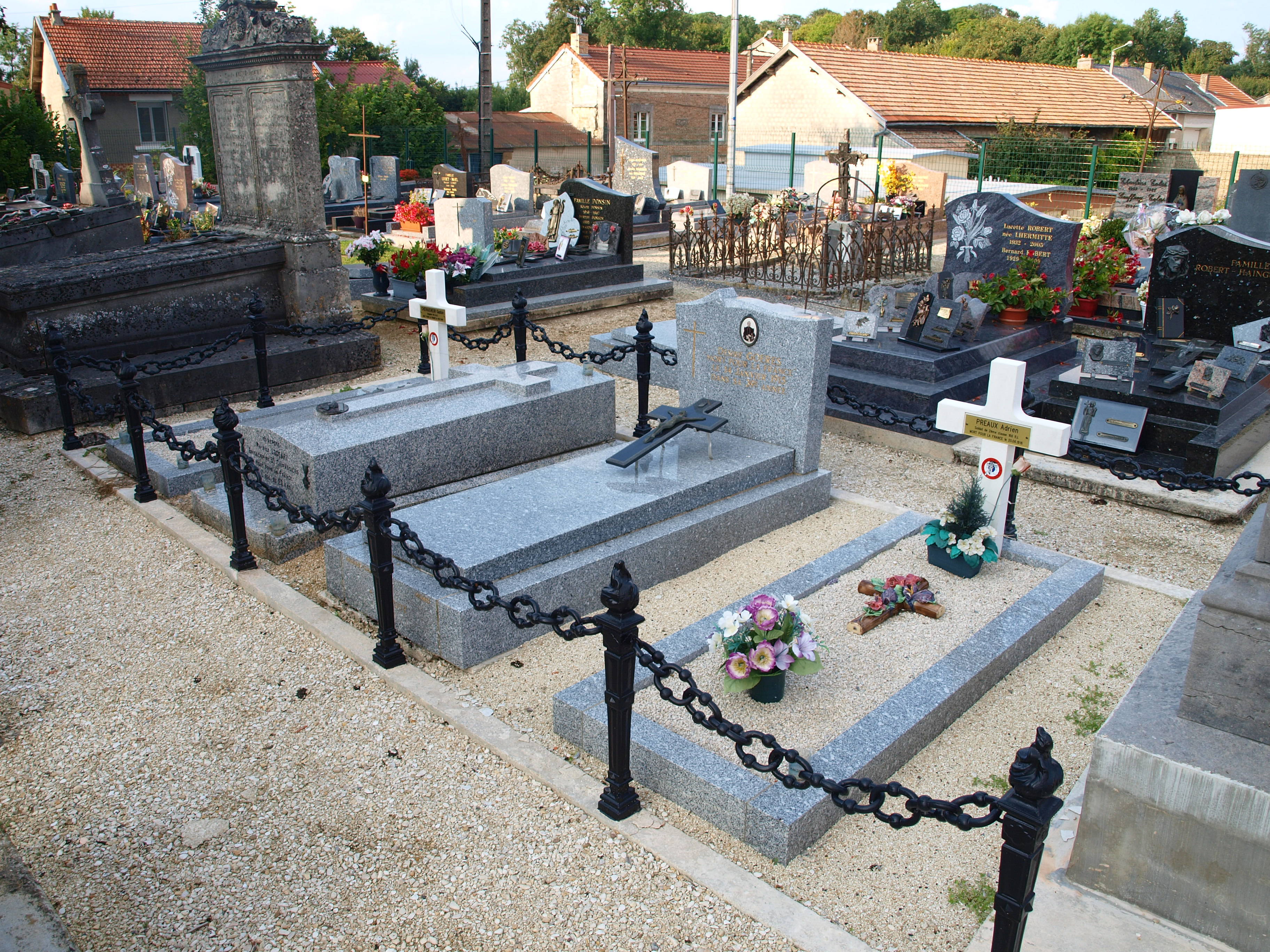
The German War Cemetery

- The German War cemetery is in the woods (which belonged to Colonel Pierre Bouchez) on the road to Heutrégiville located opposite a Russian concentration camp during World War II. Later the bodies were interred in cemeteries at Aussonce and Warmeriville. After coming to La Neuville under TAF, the German War Graves service (SESMA) settled at Heutrégiville on land sold by René Verdelet. "Reconciliation over the graves" was the motto.

== Notable people linked to the commune ==
- Jules Frérot, born in Thin-le-Moutier on 9 January 1823, died 5 October 1894 at Aussonce, forester, nurseryman, a member of the League of farmers of France, Mayor of Aussonce for 21 years, cantonal delegate, former alternate justice of the peace for the canton of Juniville.

== See also ==
- Communes of the Ardennes department

=== Bibliography ===
- Father Marq, History of Aussonce, La Neuville-en-Tourne-à-Fuy, Germigny-Pend-la-Pie, Merlan, 1872, Imprimerie V. Geoffroy et Co., Reims, p. 7-17 (in French)
