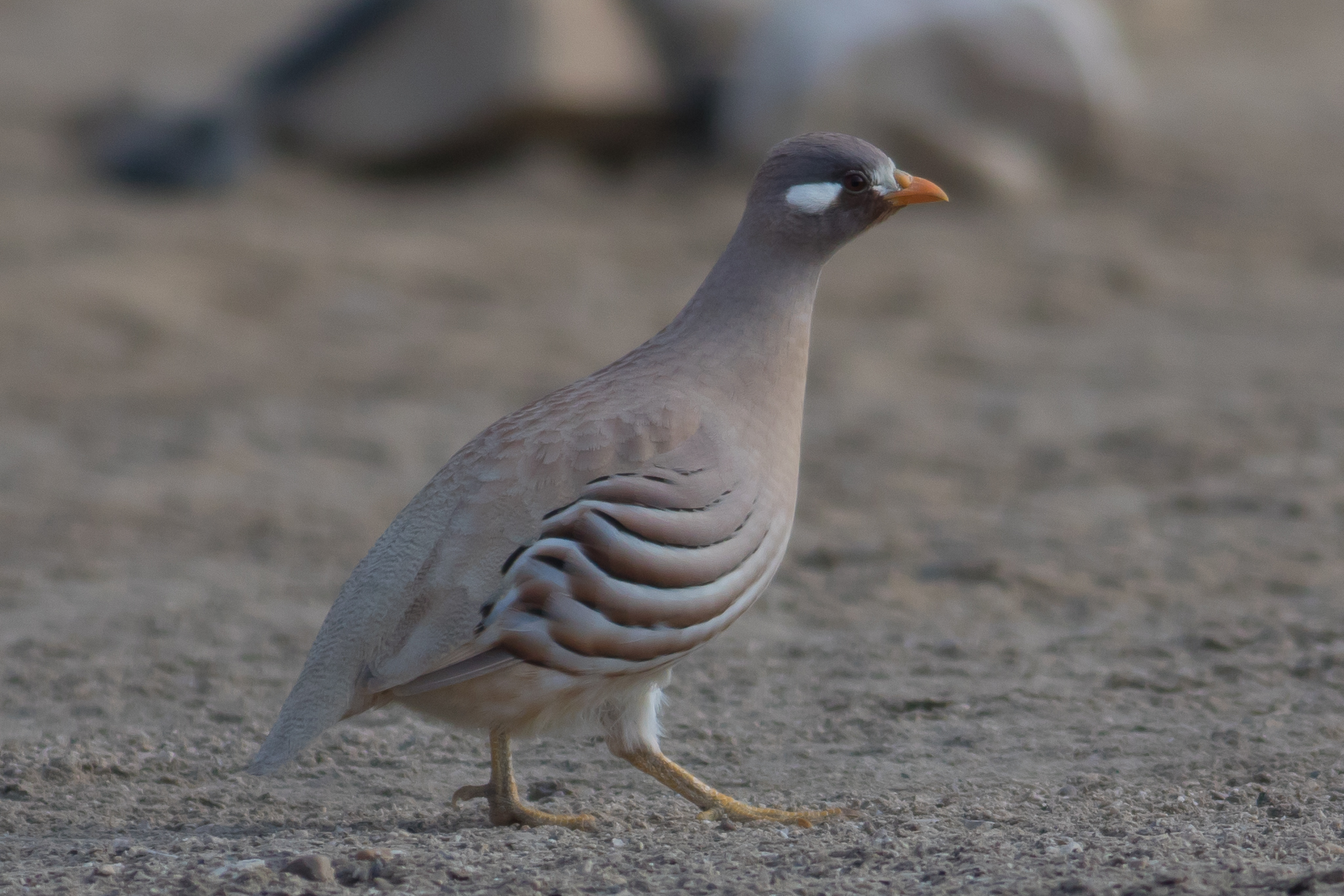

Conservation status
- Least Concern (IUCN 3.1)

Scientific classification
- Kingdom: Animalia
- Phylum: Chordata
- Class: Aves
- Order: Galliformes
- Family: Phasianidae
- Genus: Ammoperdix
- Species: A. heyi

Binomial name
- Ammoperdix heyi (Temminck, 1825)

= Sand partridge =

Species of bird

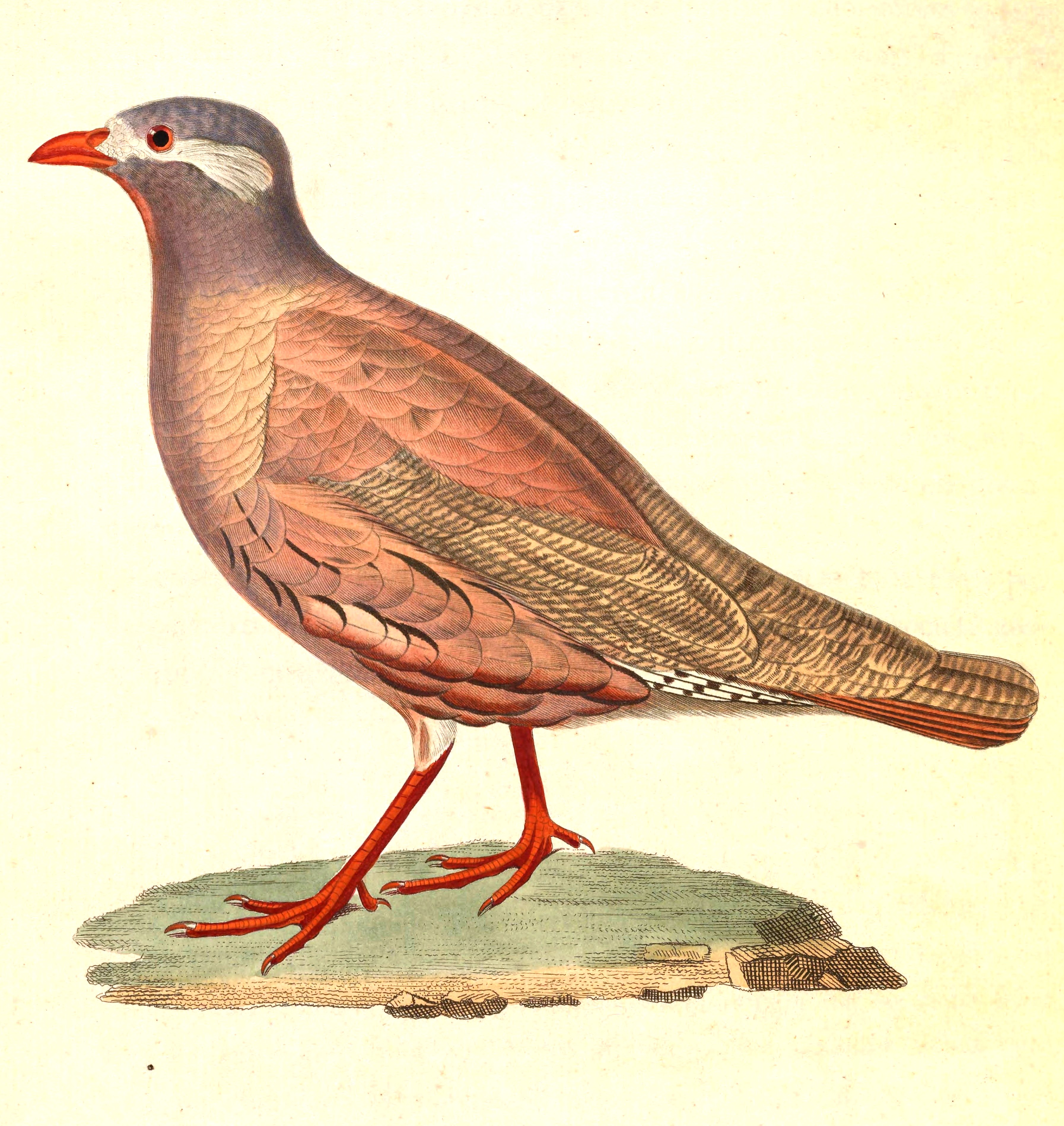
Illustration depicting the plumage of a male sand partridge.

The sand partridge (Ammoperdix heyi) is a gamebird in the pheasant family Phasianidae of the order Galliformes, gallinaceous birds.

This partridge has its main native range from Egypt and Israel east to south Arabia. It is closely related and similar to its counterpart in southeast Turkey and east to Pakistan, the see-see partridge, Ammoperdix griseogularis.

This 22–25 cm bird is a resident breeder in dry, open and often hilly country. It nests in a scantily lined ground scrape laying 5–14 eggs. The sand partridge takes a wide variety of seeds and some insect food.

== Description ==
The sand partridge is a rotund bird, mainly sandy-brown with wavy white and brown flank stripes. It ranges from 22–25 cm in height, and 180-200 g in weight. Its wingspan ranges from 39–41 cm. They can live for up to 4 years.

When disturbed, sand partridge prefers to run rather than fly, but if necessary it flies a short distance on rounded wings. The song is a slurred kwa-kwa-kwa

=== Sexual dimorphism ===
Males are larger than the females and have orange bills, rather than dull yellowish bills. The male has a grey head with a white stripe in front of the eye and a white cheek patch. The neck sides are plain, and not speckled with white. The head pattern is the best distinction from the see-see partridge. Females are a very washed-out version of males. They are sandier and greyer than males with fewer markings and have pinkish bars instead of white spots on the side of the neck. Females are more difficult to distinguish from its relative due to the weak head pattern. Male and female juveniles resemble adult females.

== Taxonomy ==
The sand partridge is one of 185 species in the ground-living family Phasianidae, the most-species rich clade in the Galliformes order. The Phasianidae family has a subfamily Phasianinae, which was considered monophyletic up until the 1990s until molecular phylogenies showed that its placement is indeed paraphyletic. The Phasianinae subfamily has two acknowledged clades: the erectile clade and the non-erectile clade (an erectile trait is a feathery or fleshy region on the head that some birds possess. It mainly evolved as a sexual signal. The sand partridge is part of the non-erectile clade, as they do not possess an erectile trait. These two clades are believed to have diverged during the early Oligocene, around 30 million years ago.

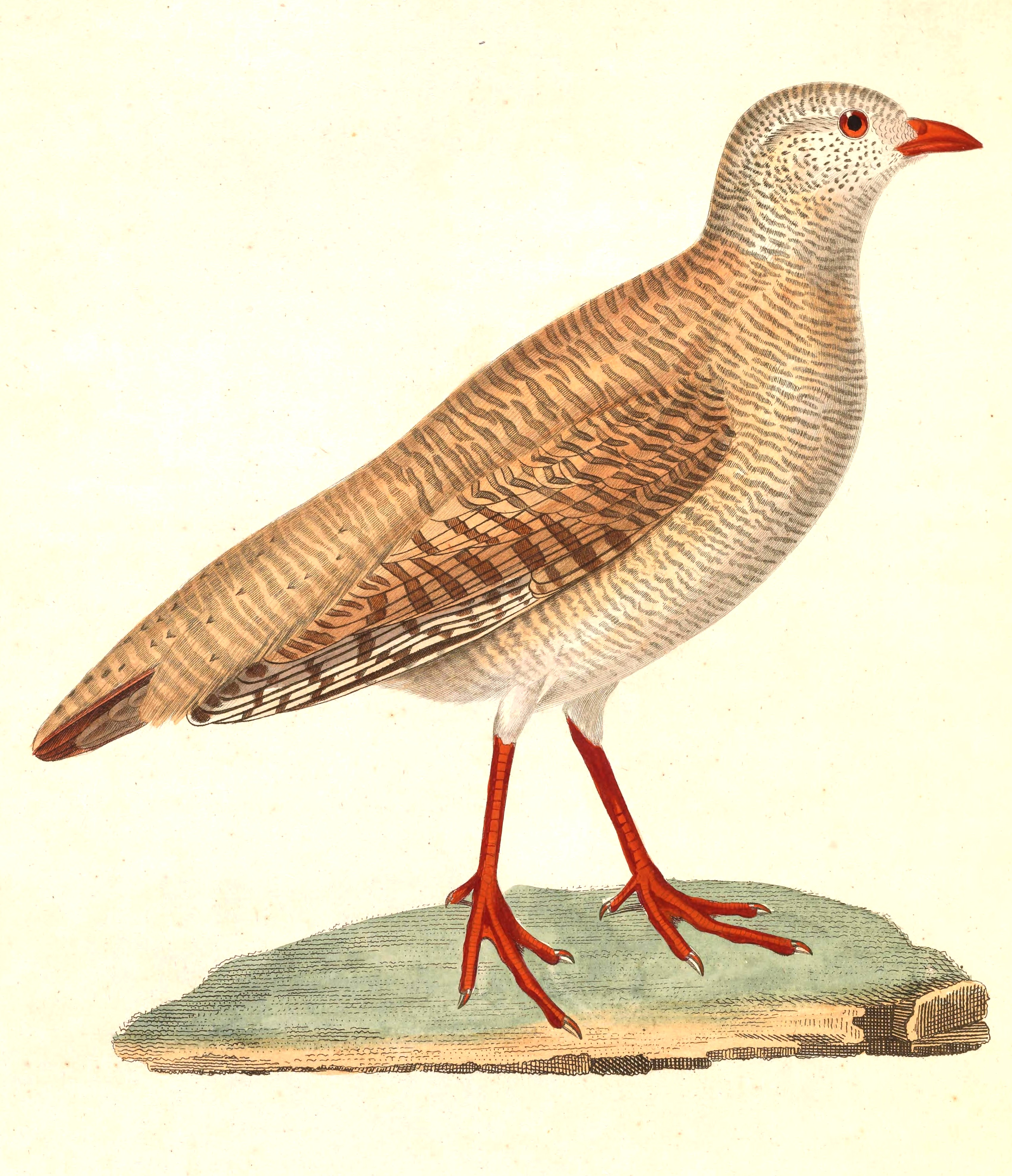
Illustration depicting the plumage of a female sand partridge.

== Habitat and distribution ==
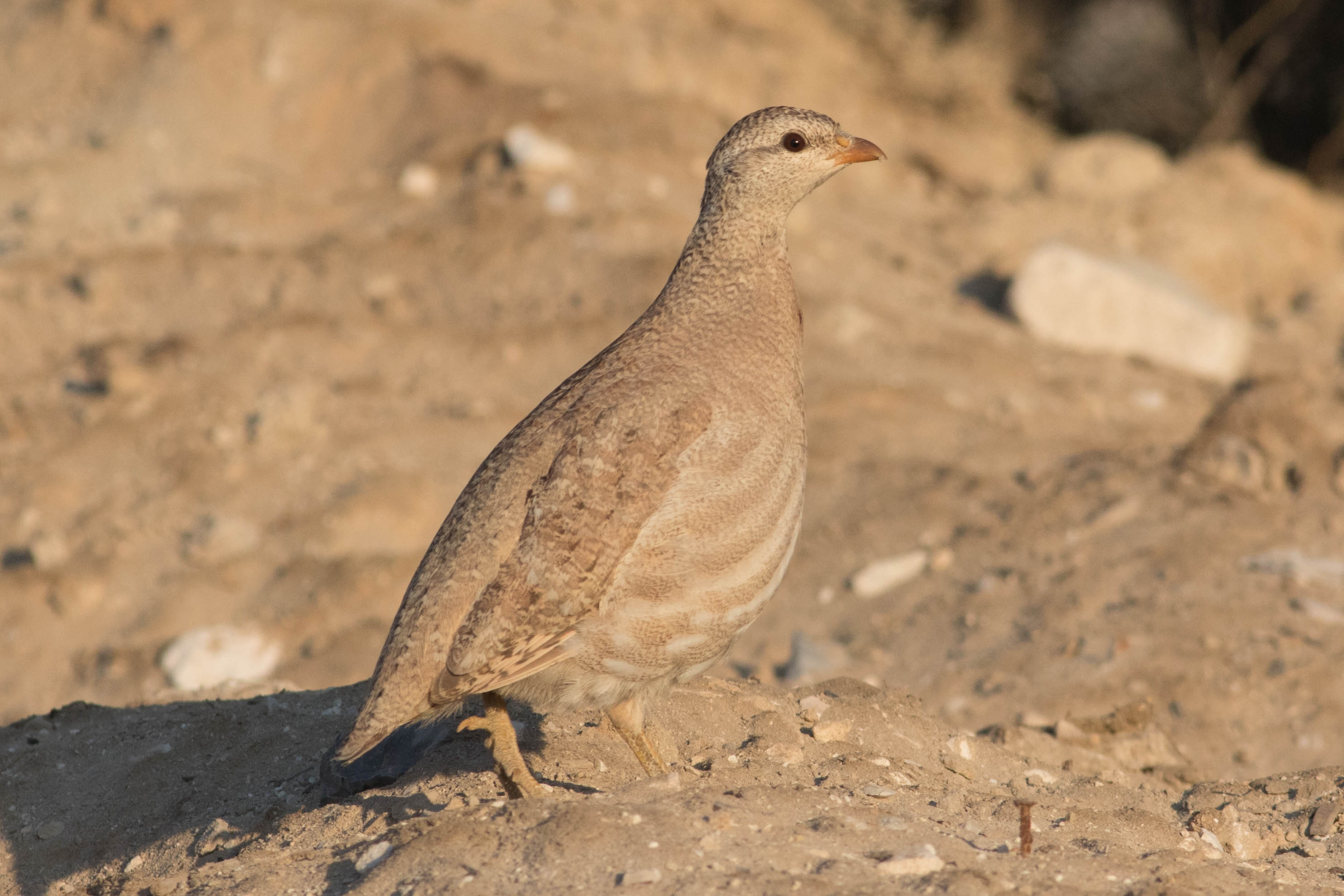
Female sand partridge.

=== Distribution ===
Sand partridges are endemic across the Middle East. Populations are distributed across Eastern Egypt, Eastern Sudan, Israel, Jordan, Saudi Arabia, Yemen, Oman, and the United Arab Emirates (UAE). The four subspecies of the sand partridge are native to specific parts of the Middle East. The Ammoperdix heyi heyi is distributed from the Jordan Valley to the Egyptian Sinai Peninsula to Saudi Arabia. The Ammopredix heyi nicolli is distributed across Northern Egypt. The Ammoperdix heyo cholmleyi is distributed from Egypt to Northern Sudan. The Ammoperdix heyi intermedius is distributed from Western Saudi Arabia to Yemen east into Oman and to the Musandam Peninsula in the UAE.

=== Habitat ===
Sand partridges can be found in desert ecosystems with scattered vegetation and boulders. They prefer steep, boulder-strewn slopes with sandy-bottomed wadis and ridges up to 2000 m and valleys down to 400 m below sea level. Sand partridges are rarely found in large stretches of dry, flat, or open desert as they require a water source for drinking. The sand partridge is non-migratory, so it breeds and spends its year in these habitats.

== Behaviour and ecology ==
=== Vocalizations ===
Known vocalizations only for male sand partridges. Male's signalling call is a "kew-kew-kew" or "watcha-watcha-watcha". When alarmed or flushed, they emit a louder, higher "quip" or "qu-ip", or a harsh "wuit-wuit-wuit".

=== Diet ===
Sand partridges are omnivorous birds. They feed on a mixed diet of plant matter and insects. During the summer, the sand partridge forages mostly for seeds and berries. Seeds come mostly from Acacia spp. and grasses. Berries come mostly from the toothbrush tree/mustard tree (Salvadora persica) and myrrhs (Commiphora spp.). Insects are mostly locusts. In Arabia specifically, sand partridges eat leaves and buds of desert thorn (Lycium shawii), Rhazya stricta and Sideroxylon mascatense. Habitats with woody vegetation height of 2–3 m between rocks are ideal foraging grounds for the sand partridge, as it provides food and also sufficient shelter from predator attacks.

=== Reproduction ===
Breeding seasons are dependent on location. In Israel, sand partridges breed between February and August. In Jordan and Sinai, Egypt, eggs are laid between March and April, whereas are only laid in April in the Northern Africa region. Within the Arabian Peninsula, eggs are laid mainly in March and April, but have been seen in Oman and Yemen as late as between August and November. Sand partridges are probably monogamous birds, but nests have been seen merely 30–70 m apart in Israel, indicating one male mating with multiple females (see polygyny). Nests are built in three different fashions. One way is the sand partridge will sparsely line the nest with grass, feathers, bits of wood, or pebbles. The second way is the sand partridge will build the nest under the cover of bush or rock and leave the nest unlined. The third way is building the nest in hollows or crevices at the base of cliffs. Females lay between 5–14 eggs that are pale grey or pink. Two females may lay in the same nest. Incubation is by females only for around 21–24 days. Chicks are white with grey upper breast and pale throat. Chicks become fledges at 9–20 days, and then are full grown at 30 days. Sand partridges can be found in groups of dozens of members, but families may come together to form large flocks of up to 70 members in later summer/early autumn.

== Status and conservation ==
The sand partridge is listed as 'Least Concern' by the IUCN. The sand partridge has a large range and is deemed common and stable in the regions it resides. The sand partridge has been introduced to two islands offshore of Saudi Arabia and the UAE. The estimated entire population of sand partridge pairs in Arabia is ~900,000 and is increasing. Sand partridges live in areas that are mainly inhabitable to humans, thus have minimal threats. Throughout Arabia, stock grazing, urbanization, drought, and climate change in general, all affect sand partridges but are not true threats. Additionally, sand partridges are hunted for sport and food, locally and nationally. Over the entire range of the sand partridges habitats, there are conservation sites present. A non-profit in Jordan known as the Jordan Outdoor Sport Association was established in 2014 to encourage sustainable hunting in the area. Releasing sand partridges to supplement hunted birds is part of their conservation work.
