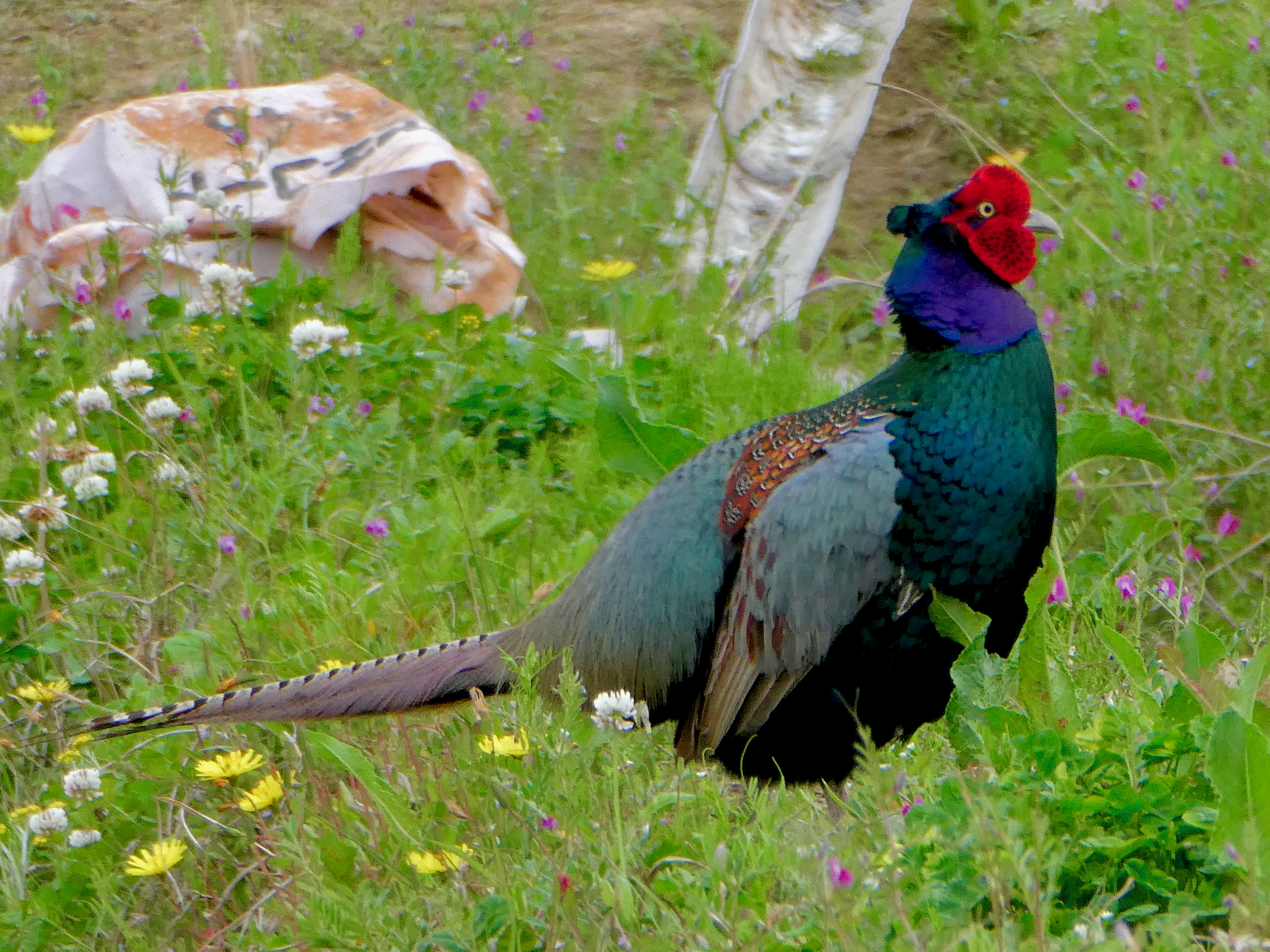
- Green pheasant (Phasianus versicolor)

Scientific classification
- Kingdom: Animalia
- Phylum: Chordata
- Class: Aves
- Order: Galliformes
- Family: Phasianidae
- Subfamily: Phasianinae
- Tribe: Phasianini; Horsfield, 1821

Genera
- Syrmaticus; Chrysolophus; Phasianus; Catreus; Crossoptilon; Lophura

= Phasianini =

Tribe of birds

Phasianini is a tribe of birds in the subfamily Phasianinae. It contains the true pheasants. Species in this tribe are found throughout Asia. This grouping was supported by a 2021 phylogenetic analysis of Galliformes, and accepted by the International Ornithological Congress. The tribe name is accepted by the Howard and Moore Complete Checklist of the Birds of the World.

== Species ==
Image	Genus	Living species
	Syrmaticus, long-tailed pheasants	Reeve's pheasant, Syrmaticus reevesi; Elliot's pheasant, Syrmaticus ellioti; Mrs. Hume's pheasant, Syrmaticus humiae; Mikado pheasant, Syrmaticus mikado; Copper pheasant, Syrmaticus soemmerringi
	Chrysolophus, ruffed pheasants	Golden pheasant, Chrysolophus pictus; Lady Amherst's pheasant, Chrysolophus amherstiae
	Phasianus, typical pheasants	Common pheasant, Phasianus colchicus; Green pheasant Phasianus versicolor
	Catreus, cheer pheasant	Cheer pheasant, Catreus wallichii
	Crossoptilon, eared pheasants	Tibetan eared pheasant, Crossoptilon harmani; White eared pheasant, Crossoptilon crossoptilon; Brown eared pheasant, Crossoptilon mantchuricum; Blue eared pheasant, Crossoptilon auritum
	Lophura, gallopheasants	Edward's pheasant, Lophura edwardsi; Swinhoe's pheasant, Lophura swinhoii; Bulwer's pheasant, Lophura bulweri; Kalij pheasant, Lophura leucomelanos; Silver pheasant, Lophura nycthemera; Imperial pheasant, Lophura imperialis; Malayan crestless fireback, Lophura erythrophthalma; Bornean crestless fireback, Lophura pyronota; Siamese fireback, Lophura diardi; Salvadori's pheasant, Lophura inornata; Hoogerwerf's pheasant, Lophura (inornata) hoogerwerfi; Crested fireback, Lophura ignita
