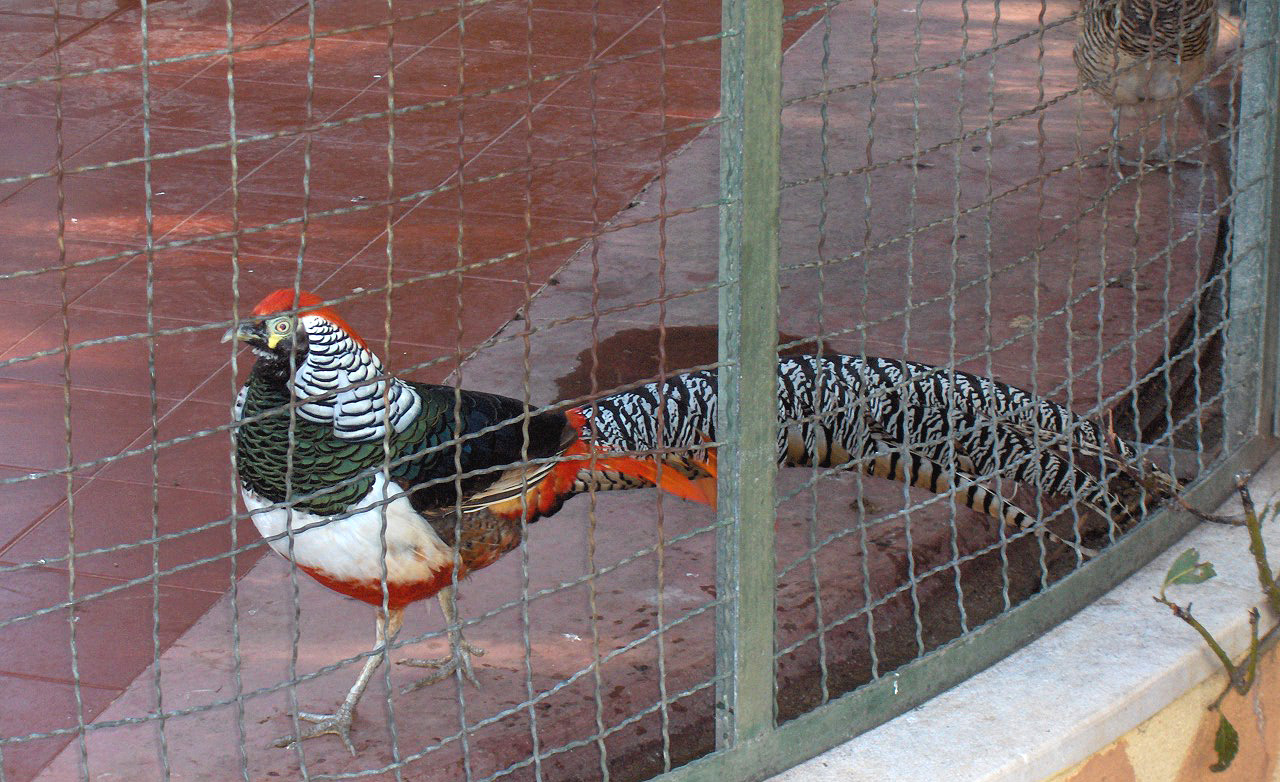

Scientific classification
- Kingdom: Animalia
- Phylum: Chordata
- Class: Aves
- Order: Galliformes
- Family: Phasianidae
- Tribe: Phasianini
- Genus: Chrysolophus
- Species: C. pictus × C. amherstiae

= Hybrid golden pheasant =

Avian hybrid

Hybrid golden pheasant is the hybrid offspring of the red golden pheasant (Chrysolophus pictus) and Lady Amherst's pheasant (Chrysolophus amherstiae).

== History ==
The known history of the hybrid golden pheasant dates back to the end of the Northern Song dynasty. During the Xuanhe period (1119–1125), Emperor Huizong of Song painted Hibiscus and Golden Pheasant (Furong Jinji Tu). The painting depicts a male golden pheasant showing morphological characteristics of both the red golden pheasant and Lady Amherst's pheasant: the neck bears the black-and-white cape feathers unique to Lady Amherst's pheasant, while the red belly and long tail shape match those of the red golden pheasant. In 2016, scientists systematically demonstrated that the individual in the painting is a hybrid golden pheasant.

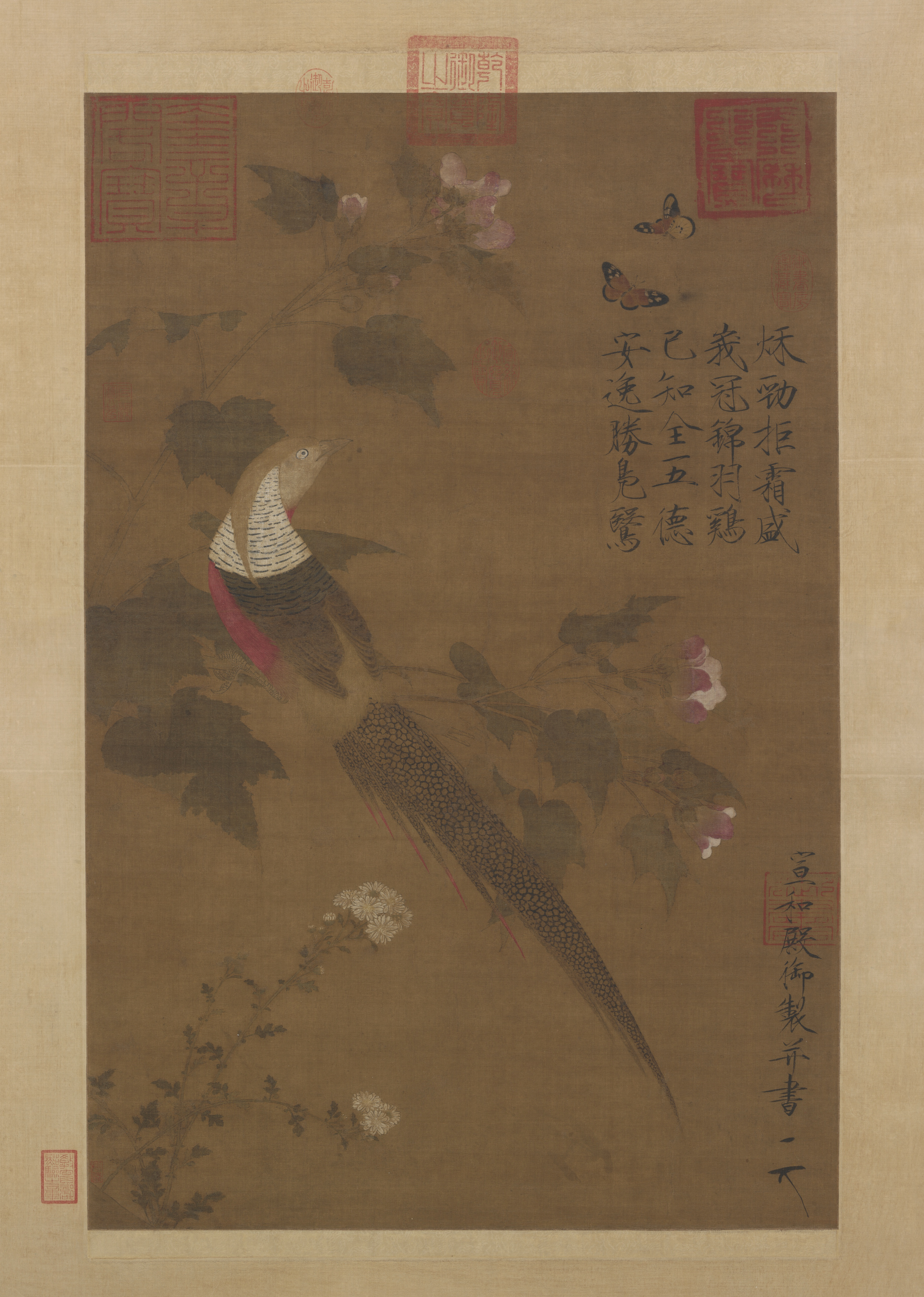
Hibiscus and Golden Pheasant (Furong Jinji Tu)

The capital of the Northern Song, Bianliang, already had a royal zoo that kept rare birds from various regions. The individual in the painting may have originated from captive hybridization or from a captured wild rare individual. This discovery pushes back the earliest human record of avian hybridization to nearly 900 years ago, more than seven centuries before the first description of hybridization between these two pheasants in Europe (1872).

== Morphology ==
All reported hybrid golden pheasants that have been confirmed are males. Female red golden pheasants and Lady Amherst's pheasants are both yellowish-brown with black spots, making their appearance highly similar; thus hybrid females are difficult to identify by external morphology alone. Male hybrid golden pheasants show a chimeric combination of parental traits, with variation in the expression of features among individuals.

Based on the individual depicted in Hibiscus and Golden Pheasant and live photographs taken by camera traps at Anzihe Nature Reserve, a typical hybrid male has the following diagnostic characteristics: the forehead, crest, and belly are red, inherited from the red golden pheasant; the hind neck is covered with white fan-shaped long feathers with black edges, a unique feature of Lady Amherst's pheasant; the throat and upper breast are dark; the upper back and wing feathers are dark green with a metallic lustre; the lower back and the flanks under the wings are yellow; the tail feathers are long and downcurved, with markings and shape similar to those of the red golden pheasant; the upper tail coverts are scarlet.

== Natural hybridization ==
Red golden pheasants and Lady Amherst's pheasants can produce fertile hybrid offspring in captivity, but natural hybrids are extremely rare in the wild. The overlapping range of the two species lies in central to southern Sichuan and northeastern Yunnan, and the area of overlap is limited.

All confirmed field records of natural hybridization come from Sichuan Province: Xuyong County (1964, 1 individual), Dayi County (1992, 5 individuals), and Anzihe Nature Reserve (2016, 1 individual).

Anzihe Nature Reserve is located in Chongzhou City, adjacent to Dayi County, on the southeastern edge of the Qionglai Mountains, and belongs to the northern edge of the two species' overlapping range. Camera-trap survey data show that within the reserve, red golden pheasants are recorded at more northerly sites while Lady Amherst's pheasants are recorded at more southerly sites; the shortest straight-line distance between recording sites of the two species is 2.07 km. At the site where the hybrid individual was photographed, Lady Amherst's pheasant was also recorded, but red golden pheasant was not.

Molecular phylogenetic studies indicate that the divergence time between the red golden pheasant and Lady Amherst's pheasant is approximately 1.75 ± 0.40 million years. This relatively short divergence history may be one reason why reproductive isolation mechanisms are not yet fully established.

The rarity of wild hybrid individuals suggests that although the two species hybridise readily in captivity, mechanisms maintaining species divergence still exist under natural conditions, such as differences in microhabitat preference or courtship selection behaviours.
