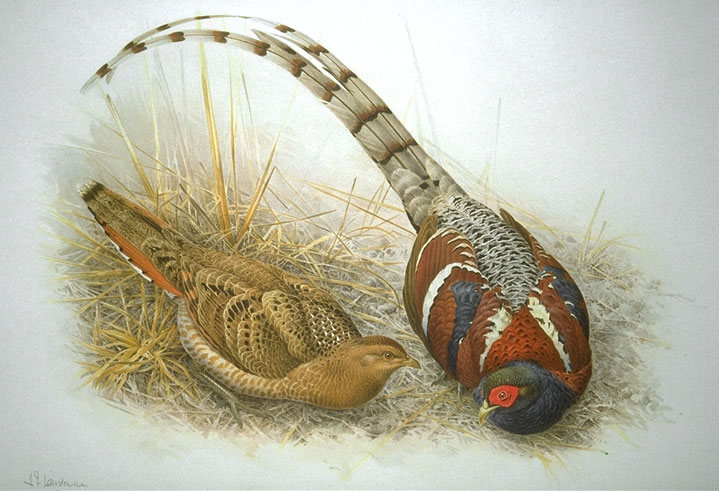
- Mrs. Hume's pheasant (Syrmaticus humiae) female (left) and male

Scientific classification
- Kingdom: Animalia
- Phylum: Chordata
- Class: Aves
- Order: Galliformes
- Family: Phasianidae
- Tribe: Phasianini
- Genus: Syrmaticus; Wagler, 1832

Type species
- Phasianus reevesii J.E. Gray, 1832

Species
- Reeves's pheasant (S. reevesii); Copper pheasant (S. soemmerringii); Mikado pheasant (S. mikado); Elliot's pheasant (S. ellioti); Mrs. Hume's pheasant (S. humiae)

= Syrmaticus =

Genus of birds

The genus Syrmaticus contains the five species of long-tailed pheasants. The males have short spurs and usually red facial wattles, but otherwise differ wildly in appearance. The hens (females) and chicks of all the species have a rather conservative and plesiomorphic drab brown color pattern. 5 species are generally accepted in this genus.

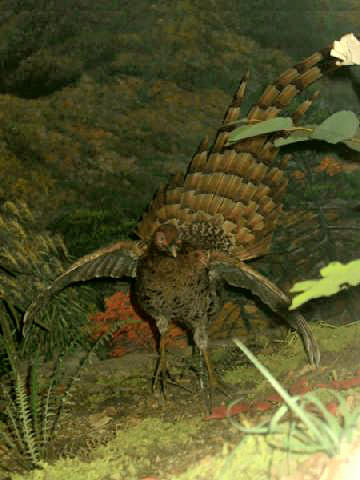
At first glance, the copper pheasant (S. soemmerringii) resembles a female common pheasant (Phasianus colchicus)

== Systematics and taxonomy ==
The genus is occasionally included in Phasianus based on DNA sequence data, but this does not seem well warranted; the molecular evolution in this genus has been unusual and can easily mislead molecular phylogenetic studies and makes molecular clocks unreliable. At least in the cytochrome b sequence transitions have outnumbered transversions to an extent rarely seen in other birds. Transition-transversion frequencies in mtDNA control region are by contrast more like those usually seen in birds, but this region of the mitochondrial genome has been evolving unusually slowly in Syrmaticus.

Still, the phylogeny and evolution of the long-tailed pheasants can be considered resolved to satisfaction by now. It was long accepted that the three southeastern species—which all have bright white wing-bands of a type not found in any close relative and differ little except in the amount and concentration of eumelanins in their plumage—form a clade. However, the two others are not as closely related to each other as was previously thought, representing two lineages that diverged independently from the main lineage instead of being sister species. Consequently, Syrmaticus is sometimes restricted to Reeves's pheasant (S. reevesii) with the copper pheasant (S. soemmerringii) placed in a monospecific genus (Graphephasianus) and the three remaining species then transferred to Calophasis; as noted above, although this may eventually turn out to be warranted it is not well supported by the available evidence.

=== Evolution ===
Of Late Miocene origin, the genus Syrmaticus originated from some pheasant species inhabiting the submontane to montane subtropical rainforest at the northwestern end of the Himalayas some 10-7 million years ago (mya) during the Tortonian – the genus is thus about as old as Gallus. The original long-tailed pheasant (which probably did not have an overly elongated tail back then) diverged from the ancestors of the Phasianus pheasants, which subsequently expanded northwest across temperate Asia of the initial range of Syrmaticus.

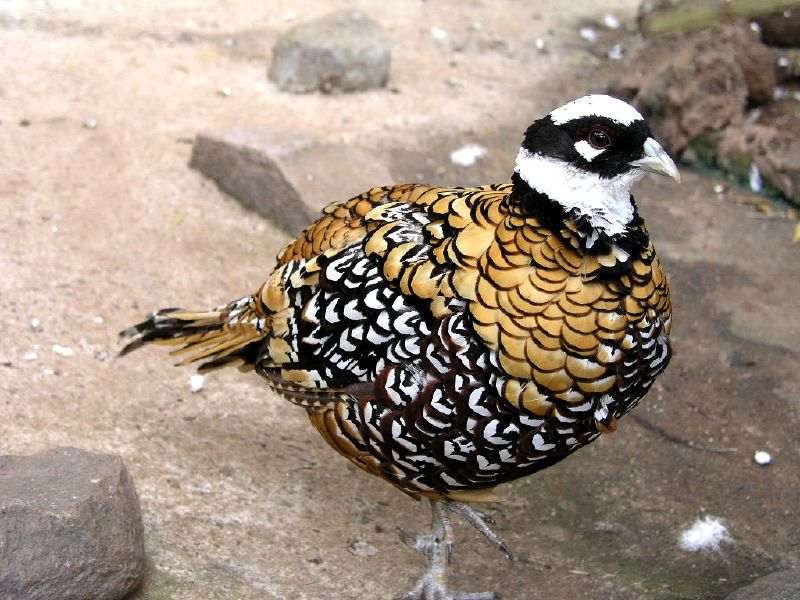
Male Reeves's pheasants (S. reevesi) are unmistakable in appearance (tail is abraded)

Reeves's pheasant (S. reevesi) is probably derived from ancestral stock that remained in the general area of the genus' origin, adapting to the local conditions and evolving numerous peculiar male apomorphies, such as the lack of facial wattles (which judging from their presence in Phasianus were present in the ancestral Syrmaticus too), the golden body plumage, the conspicuous head stripes or the immensely long tail.

The ancestors of the remaining long-tailed pheasants separated from those of Reeve's pheasant perhaps as early as the latter Tortonian but probably rather some time during the Messinian. These birds spread – perhaps in response to ecological changes brought about by a changing climate as the world turned into the last ice age – coastwards and to the southwest into the hills and lowlands of eastern Indochina and southeastern China. Around the Miocene-Pliocene boundary, roughly 5.4 mya or so, the ancestors of the copper pheasant (S. soemmerringii) separated from the mainland lineage and probably settled Japan at that time or soon thereafter.

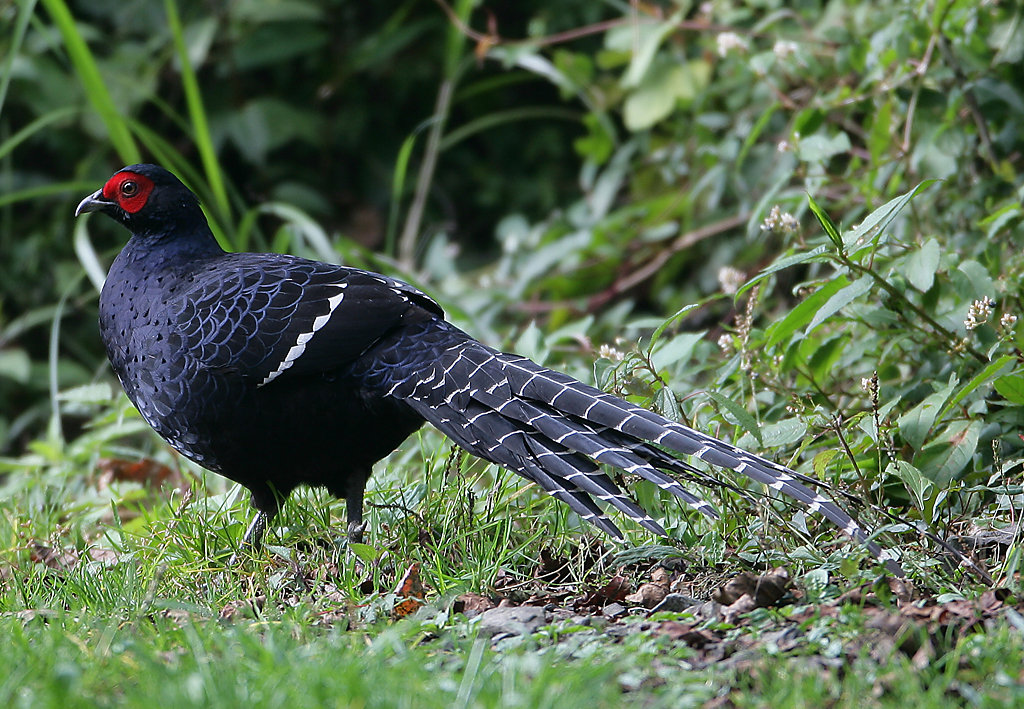
The rare Mikado pheasant (S. mikado) has much eumelanin in its male plumage, but otherwise hardly differs from its closest relatives

Perhaps the white wing-band was already present by that time; as the copper pheasant has a highly apomorphic coloration with reduced sexual dimorphism, it may well have lost such a trait after it settled Japan. But it might also have evolved only after the copper pheasant ancestors had split from those of the species displaying the wing-band today. However that may be, the minor plumage differences of the wing-banded species suggest that their last common ancestor looked almost identical to the living Mrs. Hume's pheasant (S. humiae). At some point during the Pliocene – probably around 2.8 mya during the Piacenzian – the ancestors of the Mikado pheasant (S. mikado) settled Taiwan, apparently during the period when that island separated from the mainland and alternated between being a peninsula and an island for some time. They were finally isolated no later than the Late Pliocene; the species is melanistic, suggesting a small founder population. The adjacent mainland population split into the subtropical and partially leucistic Elliot's pheasant (S. ellioti) and the tropical Mrs. Hume's pheasant only in the Middle Pleistocene, around half a million years ago. This divergence was probably in some way connected to climate changes at the Günz-Mindel interglacial to Mindel boundary, when mountains in the region became dry and at times icebound. The Nanling Mountains region marks the present-day boundary between these sister species and is not inhabited by either.

=== Extant species ===
Genus Syrmaticus – Wagler, 1832 – five species
Common name	Scientific name and subspecies	Range	Size and ecology	IUCN status and estimated population
Reeves's pheasant Male Female	Syrmaticus reevesii (Gray, JE, 1829)	China.	Size: Habitat: Diet:	VU
Copper pheasant Male Female	Syrmaticus soemmerringii (Temminck, 1830) Five subspecies: S. s. soemmerringii; S. s. ijimae; S. s. scintillans; S. s. subrufus; S. s. intermedius	Japan	Size: Habitat: Diet:	NT
Mikado pheasant Male Female	Syrmaticus mikado (Ogilvie-Grant,, 1906)	Taiwan	Size: Habitat: Diet:	NT
Elliot's pheasant Male Female	Syrmaticus ellioti (R. Swinhoe, 1872)	south-eastern China.	Size: Habitat: Diet:	NT
Mrs. Hume's pheasant Male Female	Syrmaticus humiae (Hume, 1881)	China, India, Burma and Thailand	Size: Habitat: Diet:	NT
