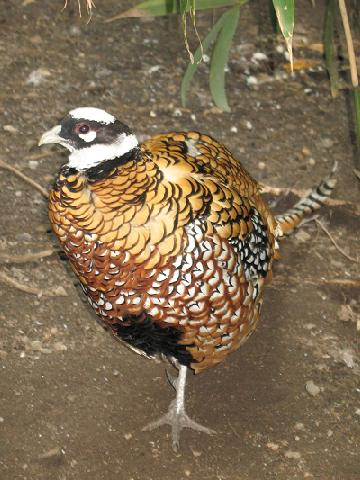
- Male at Bronx Zoo
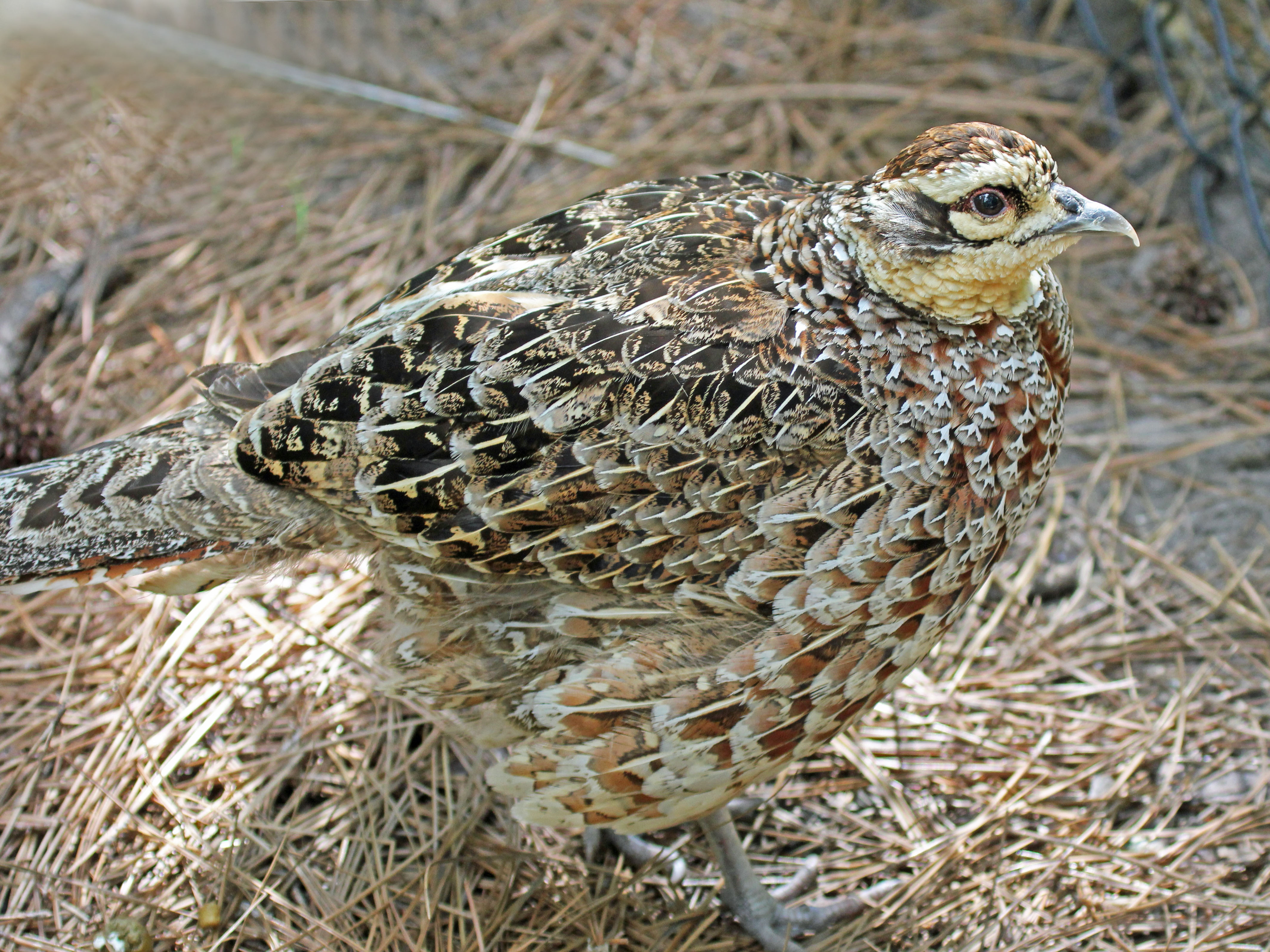
- Female at Sylvan Heights Bird Park

Conservation status
- Vulnerable (IUCN 3.1)
- CITES Appendix II

Scientific classification
- Kingdom: Animalia
- Phylum: Chordata
- Class: Aves
- Order: Galliformes
- Family: Phasianidae
- Genus: Syrmaticus
- Species: S. reevesii

Binomial name
- Syrmaticus reevesii (Gray, JE, 1829)
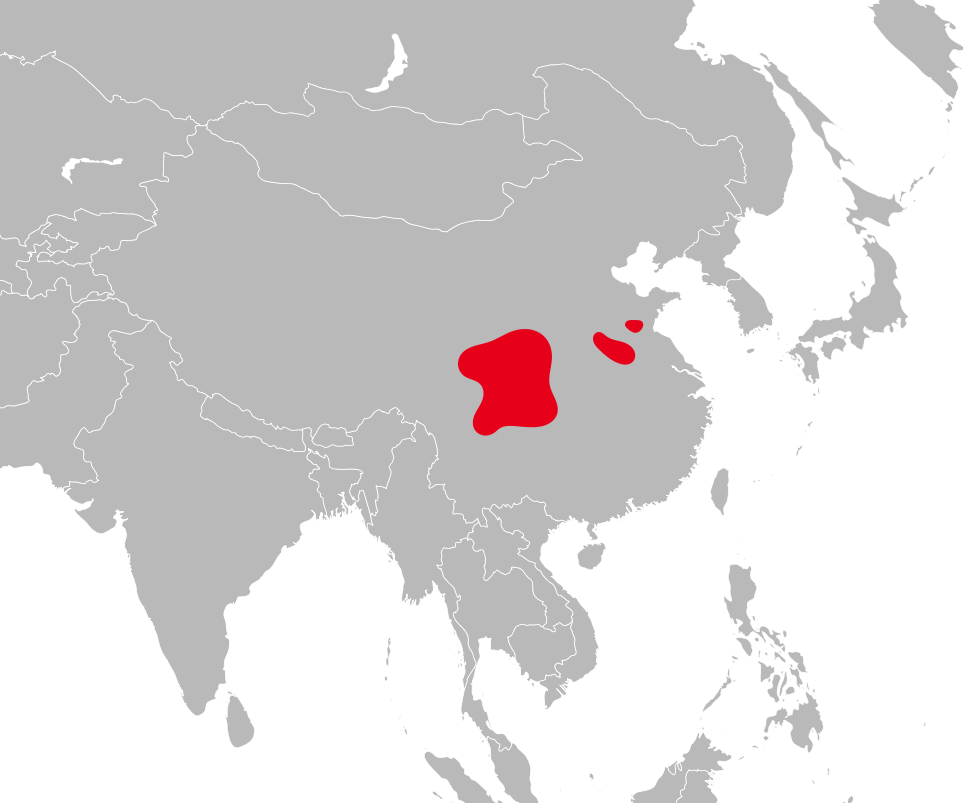
- Native range of S. reevesii

= Reeves's pheasant =

Species of bird

Reeves's pheasant (Syrmaticus reevesii) is a large pheasant within the genus Syrmaticus. It is endemic to China. It is named after the British naturalist John Reeves, who first introduced live specimens to Europe in 1831.

== Description ==
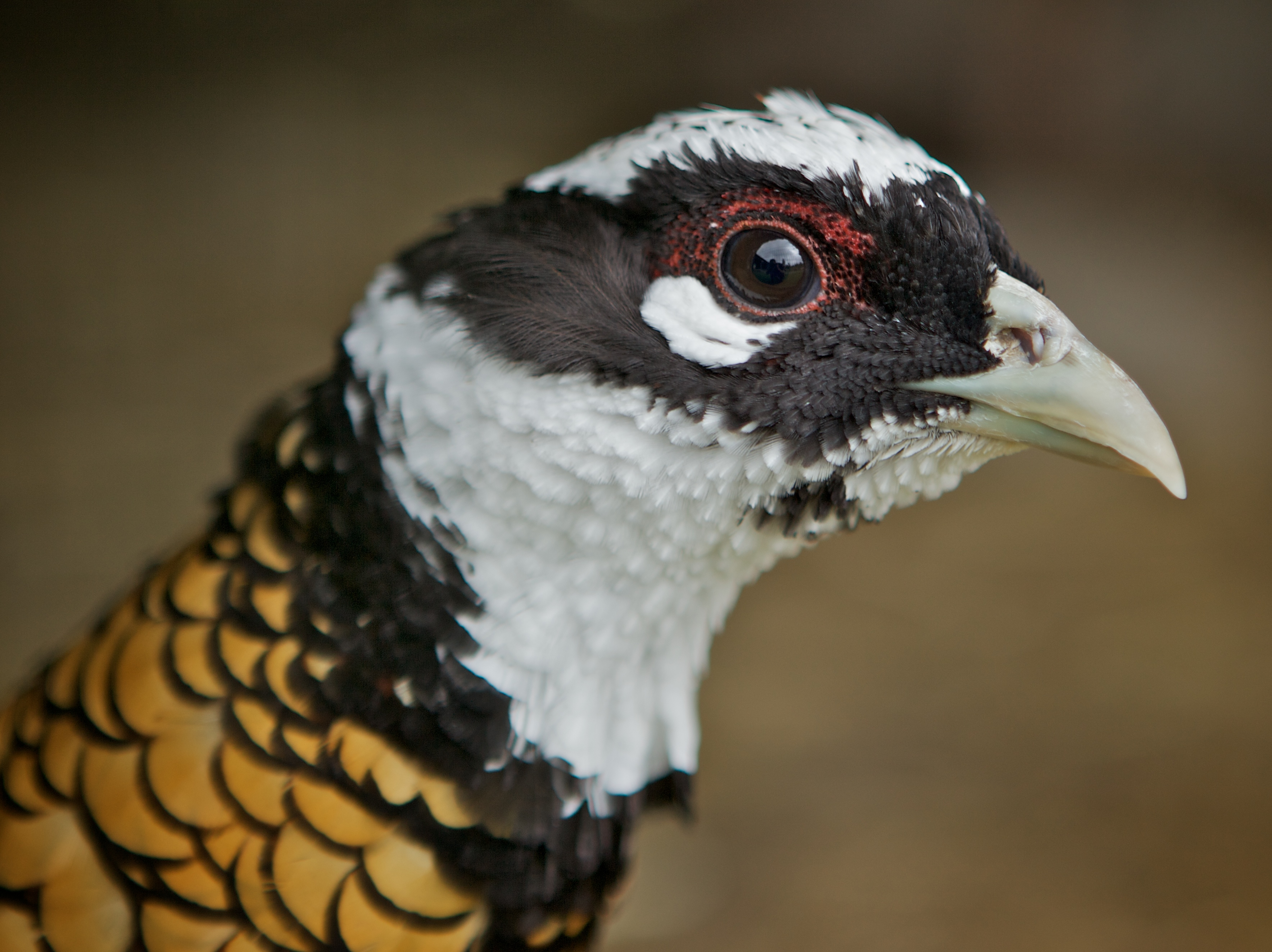
Male

Males measure 210 cm (83 in) long and weigh 1,529 g (3.371 lb). The male is brightly plumaged with a scaled golden white and red body plumage, grey legs, brown iris and bare red skin around the eye. The head is white with a black narrow band across its eyes. The male has an extremely long silvery white tail barred with chestnut brown. This pheasant is mentioned in the 2008 edition of Guinness World Records for having the longest natural tail feather of any bird species; a record formerly held by the crested argus pheasant. The tail can measure up to 2.4 m (7.9 ft) long.

Females measure 75 cm (30 in) long and weigh 949 g (2.092 lb). They are brown with a blackish crown, a buff face and greyish brown barred tail feathers. The females are about the same size as a male common pheasant.

There are no known subspecies, but there is some variation in plumage.

== Distribution and habitat ==
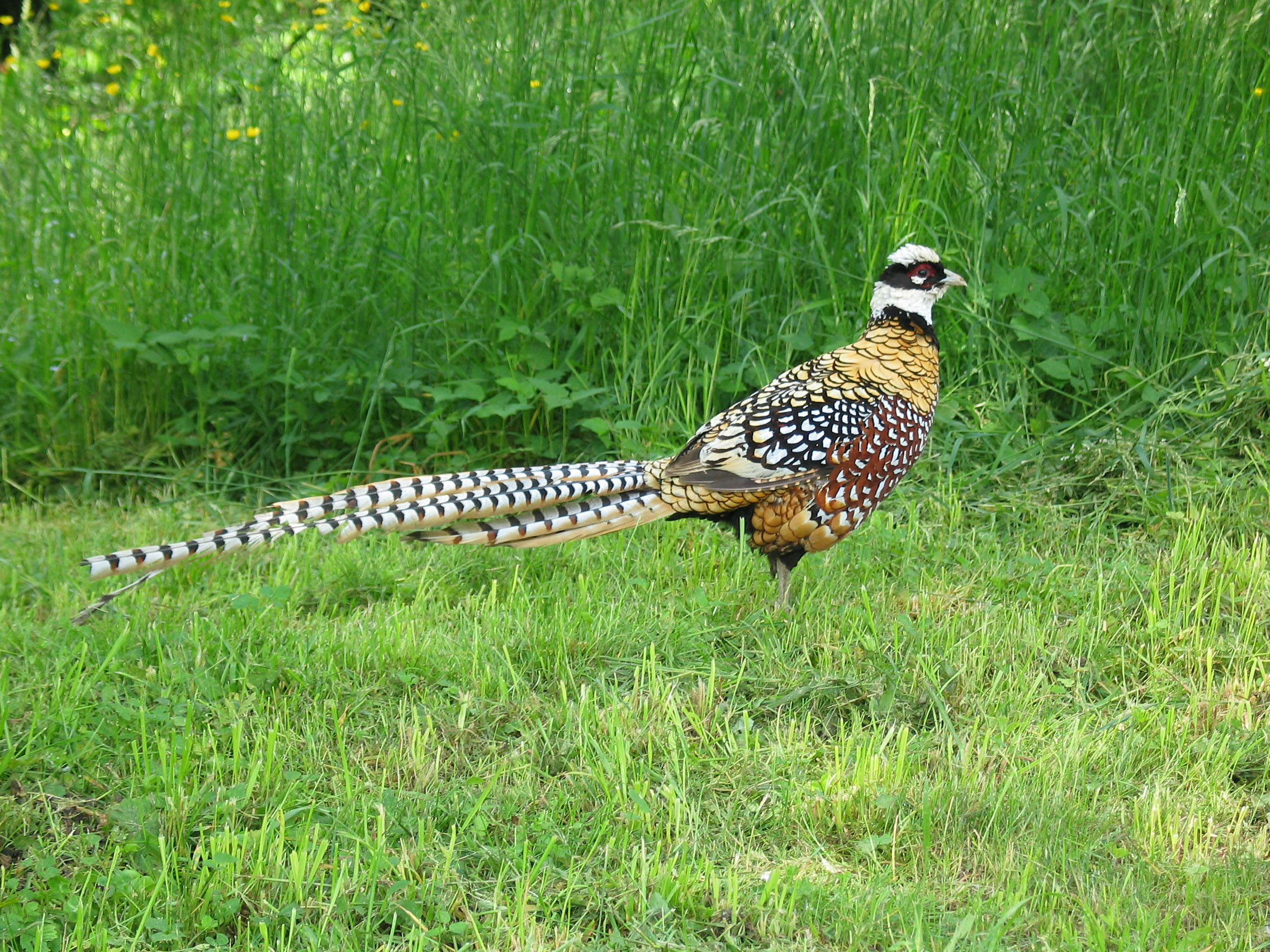
Male

The Reeves's pheasant is endemic to the temperate evergreen and deciduous forests of central and eastern China. Where introduced, they also inhabit farmland close to woodlands. The tail of the male bird grows approximately 30 cm (12 in) every year.

They have been introduced for sport and ornamental purposes to the United States, Czech Republic, France and the United Kingdom. Reeves's pheasant is considered to be a valuable gamebird due to favoring wooded hills not frequented by native gamebirds and to being a high flyer when startled. Reeves's pheasants were introduced in the United Kingdom in a number of estates across England, Scotland, and Ireland; breeding was reported in a number of locations, but most of these introductions did not develop established populations. While sporadic sightings occurred across the country, the only locations with significant breeding activity by the late 1970s were Woburn, Bedfordshire, and Kinveachy in the Caledonian Forest. By 2009, no areas of notable reproduction were noted. The species' failure to establish itself is attributed to the males' tendency to wander from their areas of release, which, together with their call not carrying as far as other species', hampers reproduction. Additionally, the birds have interbred with the larger populations of common pheasants, resulting in dilution of the released stock.

== Behaviour ==
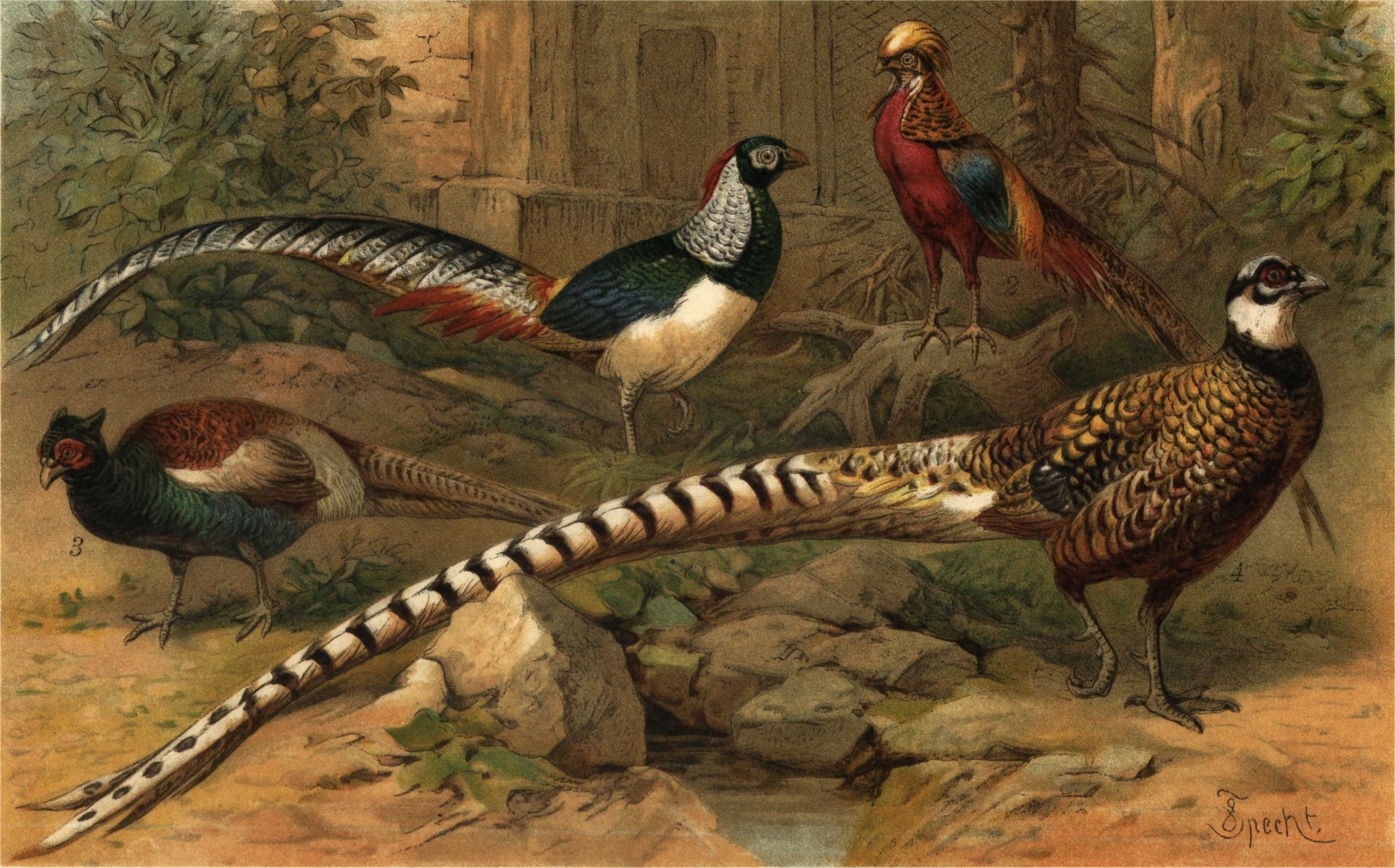
Male Reeves's pheasant, green pheasant, Lady Amherst's pheasant and golden pheasant (front to back).

The Reeves's pheasant is a hardy bird and is able to tolerate both hot and cold weather. They prefer higher ground for nesting. The female lays a clutch of 7–14 eggs in April or May; the incubation period is 24–25 days. Reeves's pheasants are often aggressive towards humans, animals, and other pheasants, particularly during the breeding season.

Their call is unlike other game birds in that it is a musical warble, sounding more passerine than a galliform bird. Their diet is vegetable matter, including seeds and cereals. They are fairly common in aviculture.

== Conservation ==
Due to ongoing habitat loss, and overhunting for food and its tail plumes, the Reeves's pheasant is evaluated as Vulnerable on the IUCN Red List of Threatened Species. There are thought to be only around 2000 birds remaining in the wild. The species is included in Appendix II of the Convention on International Trade in Endangered Species (CITES) meaning international export/import (including in parts and derivatives such as feathers) requires CITES documentation to be obtained and presented to border authorities.

== See also ==
- List of endangered and protected species of China
