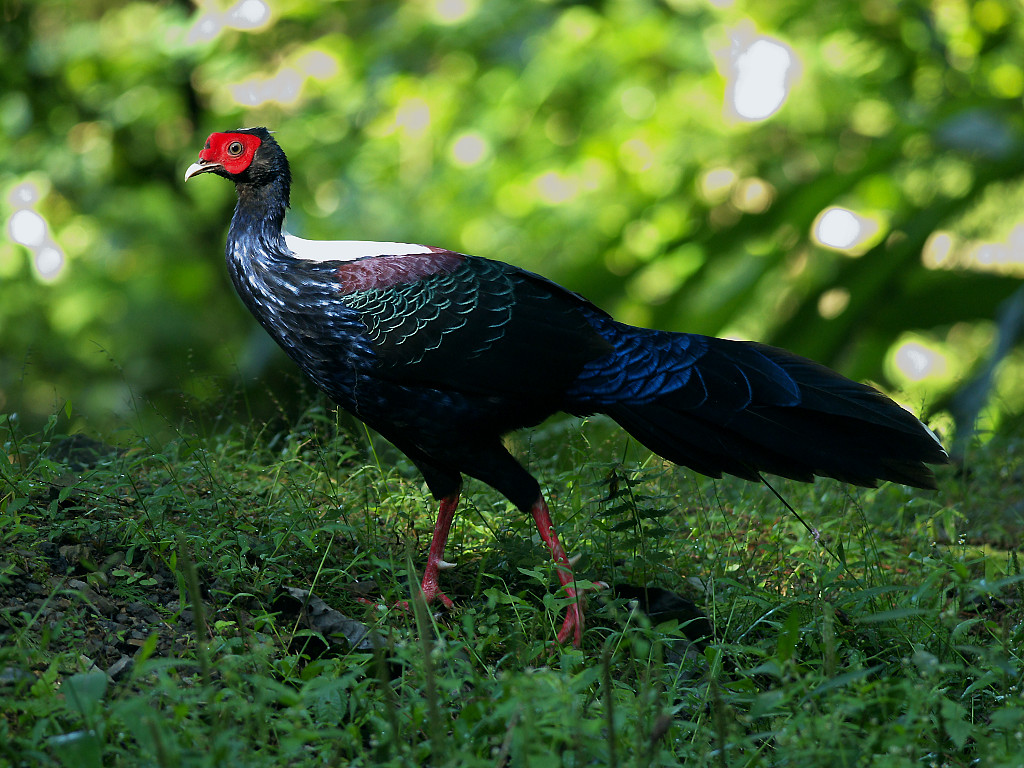

Conservation status
- Near Threatened (IUCN 3.1)
- CITES Appendix I

Scientific classification
- Kingdom: Animalia
- Phylum: Chordata
- Class: Aves
- Order: Galliformes
- Family: Phasianidae
- Genus: Lophura
- Species: L. swinhoii

Binomial name
- Lophura swinhoii (Gould, 1863)

Synonyms
- Euplocomus swinhoei

= Swinhoe's pheasant =

Species of bird

Swinhoe's pheasant (Lophura swinhoii), also known as the Taiwan blue pheasant, is a bird of the pheasant subfamily in the fowl family Phasianidae. It is endemic to Taiwan. Along with the Mikado pheasant and Taiwan blue magpie, two other Taiwan endemics, Swinhoe's pheasant is sometimes considered an unofficial national symbol for Taiwan, as it bears the colours of the national flag (red, white, and blue).

== Etymology ==
The bird was named after British naturalist Robert Swinhoe, who first discovered the species in 1862. Locally, the species is known in Mandarin as lánfùxián (Chinese: 藍腹鷴; lit. 'blue-breasted kalij') in Korean as San-gye (산계; 山鷄), and in Taiwanese Hokkien as wa-koe (華雞; hôa-koe; 'flowered fowl'; also 畫雞).

== Description ==
The male Swinhoe's pheasant can grow up to 79 cm. He has a glossy blue-purple chest, belly, and rump, white nape, red wattles, white tail feathers, and a white crest. The female is brown marked with yellow, arrow-shaped spots and complex barring patterns, and has maroon outer rectrices. The juvenile male is dark blue with brown and yellow patterns on its wings. Swinhoe's pheasants can also be distinguished from the Mikado pheasant by having red legs.

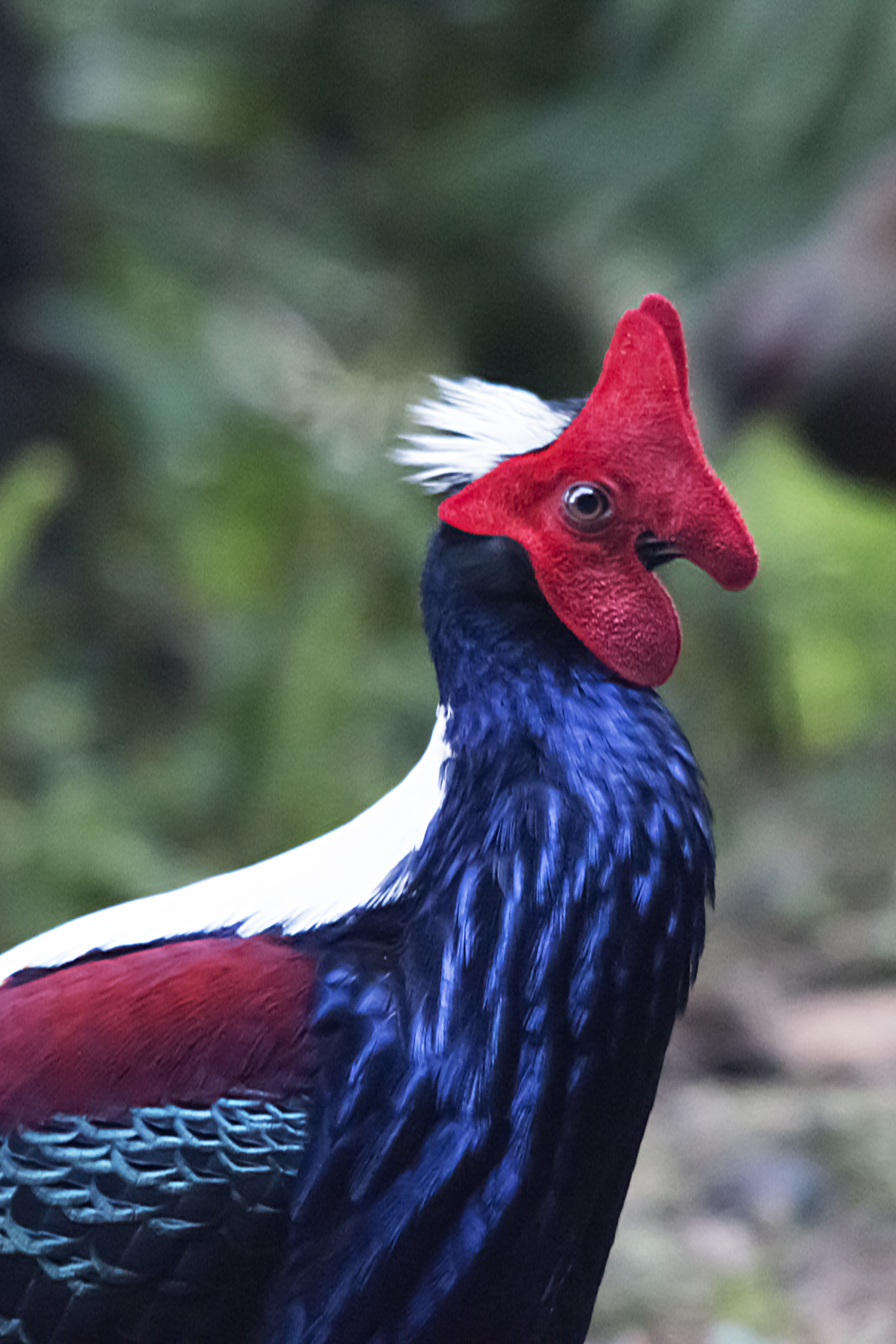
Male Swinhoe's pheasant with wattles fully engorged for display

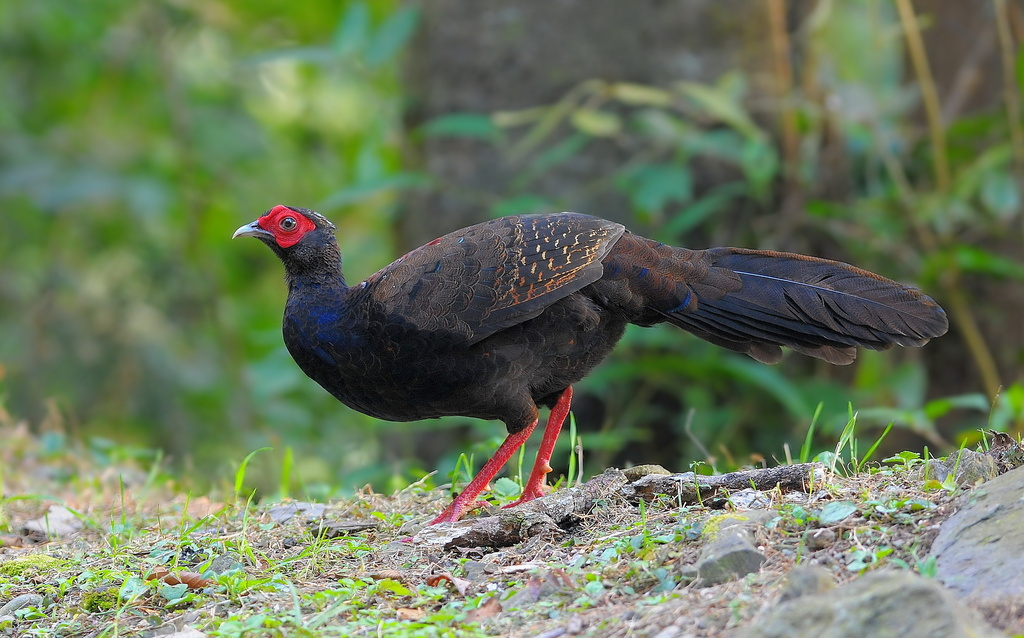
Juvenile Swinhoe's pheasant

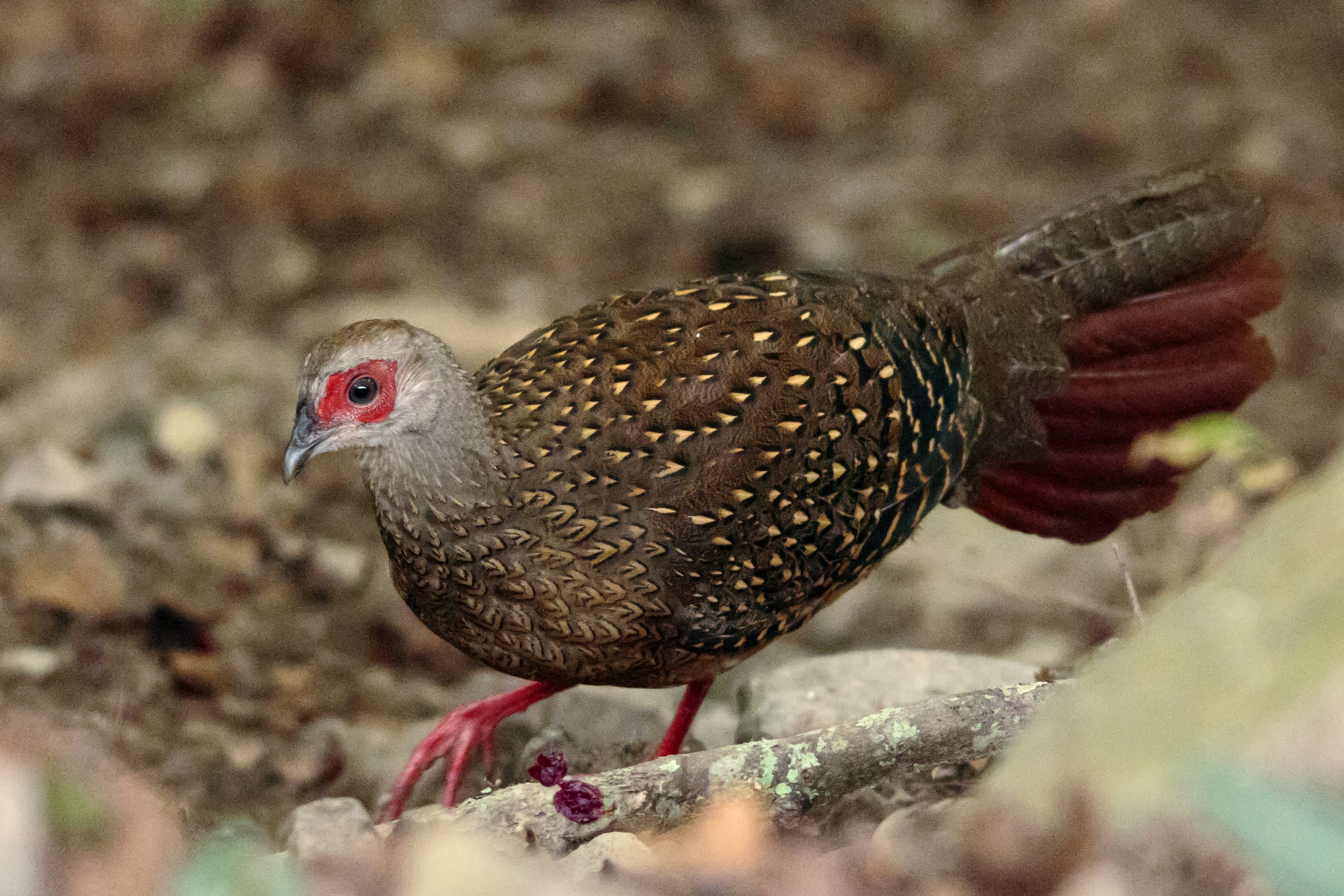
Female Swinhoe's pheasant

During display, the male's wattles become engorged and he performs a display consisting of a hop followed by running in a circle around females. A frontal display with the tail fanned is occasionally observed. He also does a wing-whirring display like other Lophura pheasants.

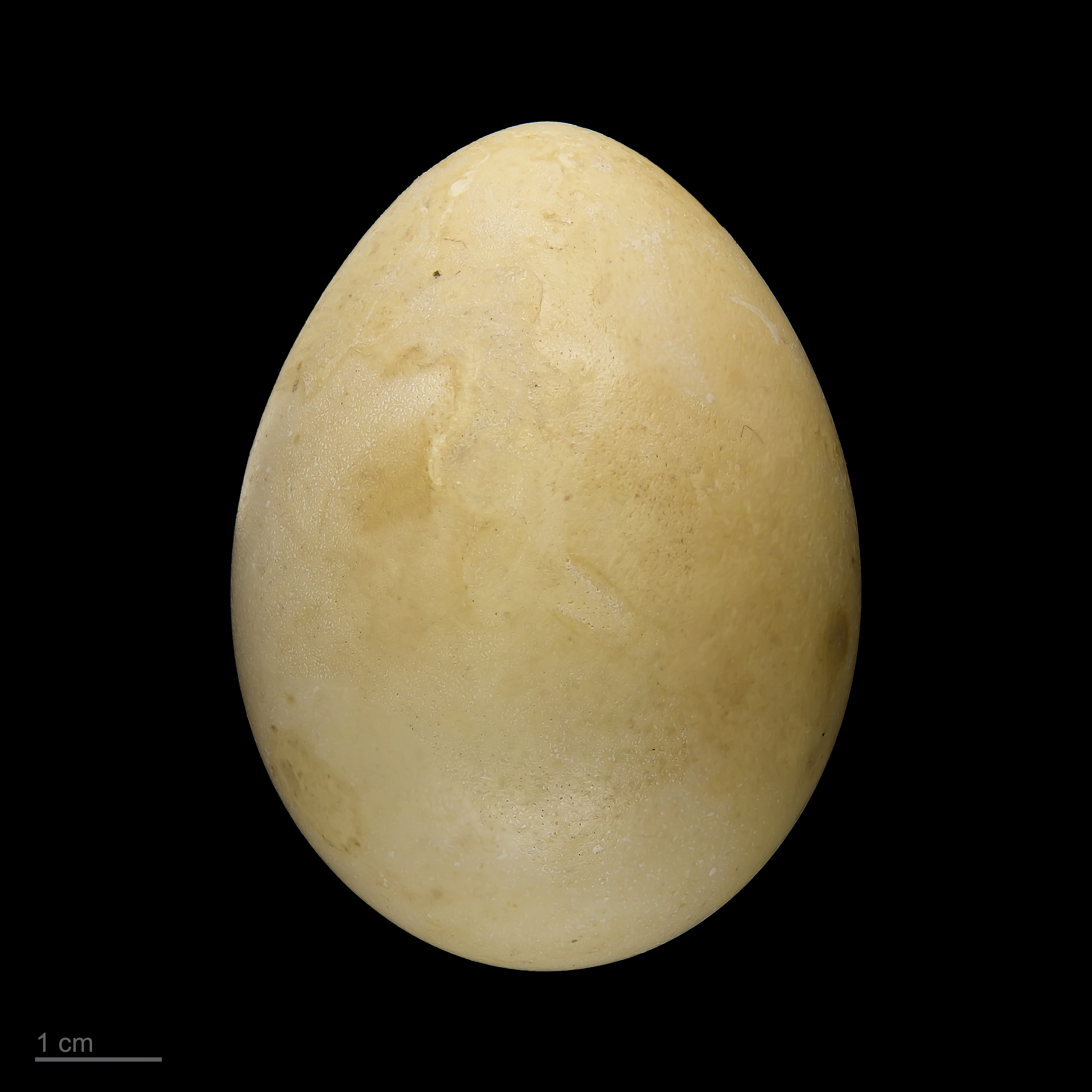
Egg - MHNT

== Habitat ==
Swinhoe's pheasant is found in the mountains of central Taiwan, where it lives in primary broadleaf forest up to 2,300 m in elevation.

== Behaviour ==
Swinhoe's pheasant eats seeds, fruits, and some insects and other animal matter. Predators include the crested goshawk, white-bellied sea eagle, Gurney's eagle, spot-bellied eagle-owl, and the civet and badger.

The female lays a clutch of two to six eggs, which are incubated for 25 to 28 days. The young can leave the nest at 2-3 days old. Swinhoe's pheasant is often assumed to be polygynous, as males are often seen with several females, though confirmation is lacking.

== Conservation ==
This pheasant has a small population in a limited range that is shrinking due to habitat degradation. Logging is a problem. It was hunted in the past, and some populations were extirpated in the 1960s and 1970s. Today, its global population is estimated to be over 10,000 individuals. Some populations are secure within protected areas, but others may be declining. Alongside the Mikado pheasant and Taiwan magpie, they are sometimes unofficially considered national symbols of Taiwan, which has helped in their conservation and protection. In some areas, such as Dasyueshan National Forest Recreation Area, they are regularly sighted feeding along roadsides, which have become bird-watching hotspots. Often they are fed by bird photographers, which has been considered a controversial practice by some conservationists and liable to a fine by park officials.

== See also ==
- List of protected species in Taiwan
- List of endemic species of Taiwan
- List of endemic birds of Taiwan
