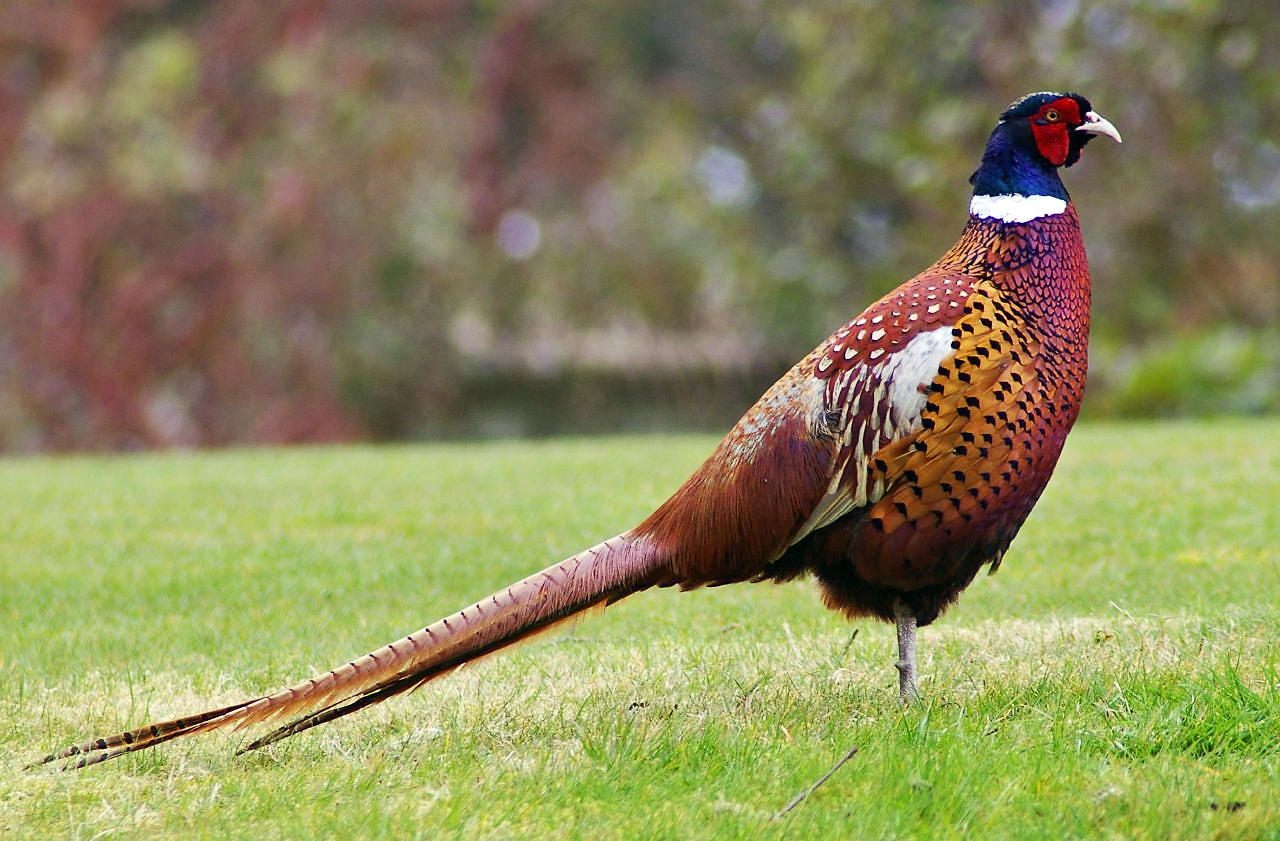
- Mongolian ringneck-type common pheasant (P. colchicus) cock

Scientific classification
- Kingdom: Animalia
- Phylum: Chordata
- Class: Aves
- Order: Galliformes
- Family: Phasianidae
- Tribe: Phasianini
- Genus: Phasianus; Linnaeus, 1758

Type species
- Phasianus colchicus Linnaeus, 1758

Species
- Phasianus colchicus; Phasianus versicolor; †Phasianus bulgaricus

= Phasianus =

Phasianus Temporal range: Late Miocene-Recent, 5.4–0 Ma

Genus of birds

The "typical" pheasant genus Phasianus in the family Phasianidae consists of two species. The genus name is Latin for pheasant.

== Taxonomy ==
The genus Phasianus was introduced in 1758 by the Swedish naturalist Carl Linnaeus in the tenth edition of his Systema Naturae. The genus name is Latin for "pheasant" deriving from Ancient Greek φἀσιἀνος, phāsiānos, meaning "(bird) of the Phasis", Phasis being the old name for the Rioni flowing downstream the east Colchian coast of the Black Sea (now western Georgia), where Argonauts set foot on its banks and found such birds there. The type species of the genus is the common pheasant (Phasianus colchicus).

=== Species ===
The genus contains just two species.

Male	Female	Name	Common name	Distribution
		Phasianus colchicus	common pheasant	Asia; introduced to Europe, North America, Oceania, Morocco
		Phasianus versicolor	green pheasant	Japan

The common pheasant (P. colchicus) has about 30 recognised subspecies forming five or six distinct groups; one is only found on the island of Taiwan off the southern coast of continental China, and the rest on the Asian mainland, reaching west to the Caucasus. Some subspecies have been introduced to Europe, North America and elsewhere, where they have hybridized and become well established.

The green pheasant (P. versicolor) is a species from Japan that the fossil record suggests diverged about 2.0–1.8 million years ago from P. colchicus.

Fossil remains of a Phasianus pheasant have been found in Late Miocene rocks in China. Additionally, fossil material belonging to a new species of Phasianus was described in 2020 as P. bulgaricus. The fossils were recovered from Miocene (Turolian) strata in Bulgaria. Thus, like many other phasianid genera, this lineage dates back more than 5,000,000 years.

== Sexual selection ==
Phasianus pheasants are a harem polygynous species that are a highly sexually dimorphic genus, where males are large and elaborately ornamented with brightly coloured plumage, ear tufts, wattles, spurs, and long tails, compared to females that are non-ornamented with a dull cryptic plumage. They have a polygynous mating system that is based upon males defending mating territories during breeding season in the early spring to control access to females with higher quality resources and defence against predation. Females are free to move between different male territories, allowing them to benefit from direct or indirect benefits by choosing high quality mates and areas with better resources for their offspring. Phasianus chicks are precocial so males provide no parental care for their young.

A male's ornaments and weaponry are a symbol of status that allow females and rivals to examine a male's fitness and fighting ability. During breeding season, males court females or challenge other males by enlarging their sexual traits, sloping their body towards their opponent or mate while spreading their tail and plumage, inflating the wattle and raising their ear tufts. Older males usually have more exaggerated ornaments and weaponry than younger males, and are more likely to mate and control larger territories. Submissive or juvenile males will conceal their wattle display from bigger males, reducing their chance of mating but minimizing their risk of injury by avoiding physical conflict with a more dominant male. The general brightness of the plumage may also be used to identify healthy males from unhealthy males. Only in cases where males exhibit similar characteristics, do males attack one another.

To display these traits throughout breeding season entails a physiological cost, leading to an endurance rivalry between males, where only males that can afford to display these breeding rituals will pass on their genes to their offspring. An example of this can be seen in the length of a male's spur and the wattle display that is enlarged during sexual displays; both are considered costly as they are highly dependent on nutrition and testosterone levels. Females generally prefer brighter wattles and longer spurs. The brightness in the wattle comes from storing a carotenoid pigment known as astaxanthin in their diet that is inhibited by an infestation of parasites. Only healthy individuals in good physical condition can afford to fully express bigger and brighter wattles, which may also be associated with disease resistance. Spurs function not only as weapons in combat between males but also as an important cue in female choice as the length of the spur signifies the male's phenotypic condition (age, weight, size) and viability. Studies have found that longer spurs resulted in bigger harem sizes compared to males with shorter spurs.

Females will benefit from choosing males with higher expressed ornaments, as her offspring will also inherit these genes, increasing their survival and chance for reproduction (sexy son hypothesis).
