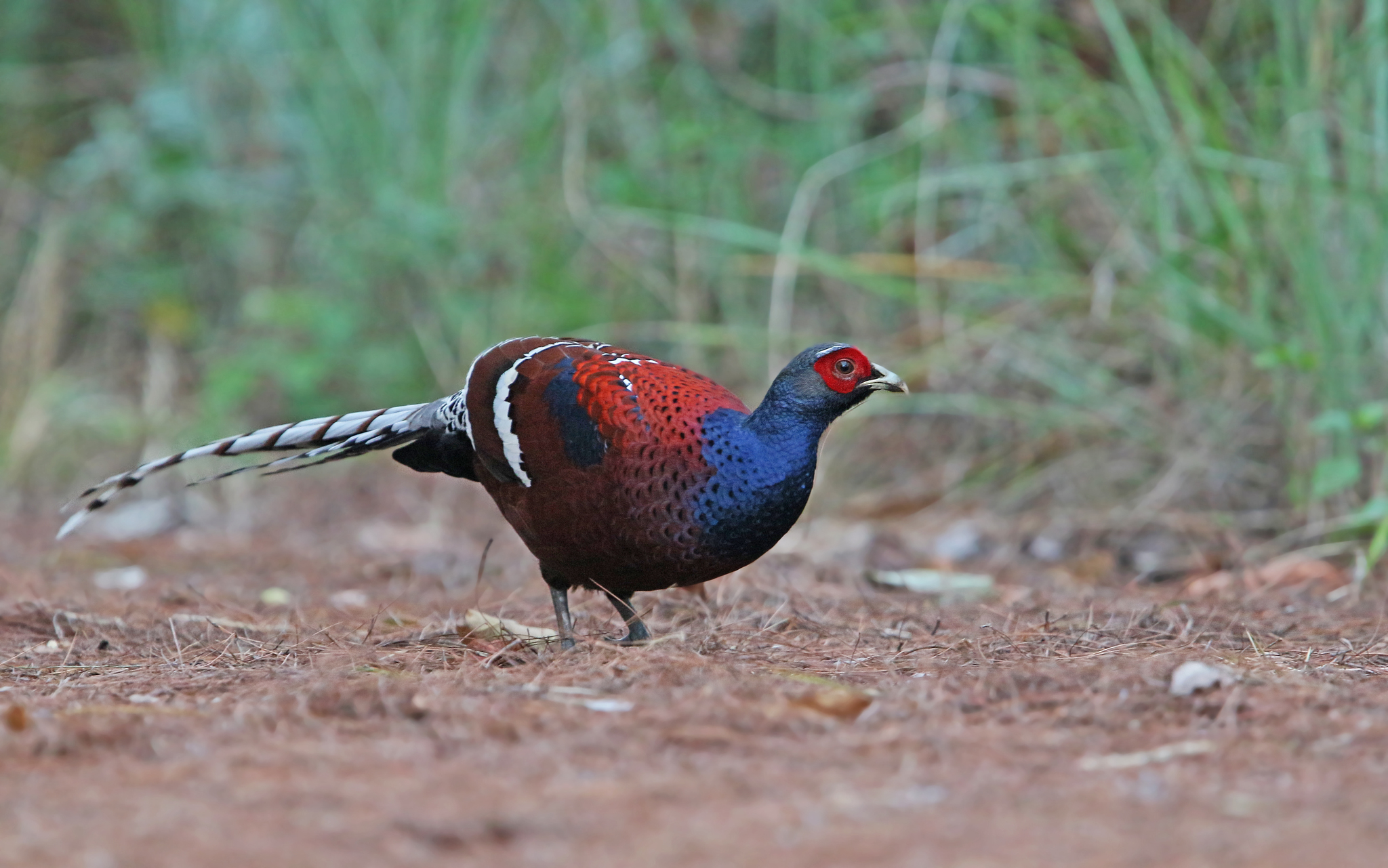
- Male S. h. burmanicus

Conservation status
- Vulnerable (IUCN 3.1)
- CITES Appendix I

Scientific classification
- Kingdom: Animalia
- Phylum: Chordata
- Class: Aves
- Order: Galliformes
- Family: Phasianidae
- Genus: Syrmaticus
- Species: S. humiae

Binomial name
- Syrmaticus humiae (Hume, 1881)
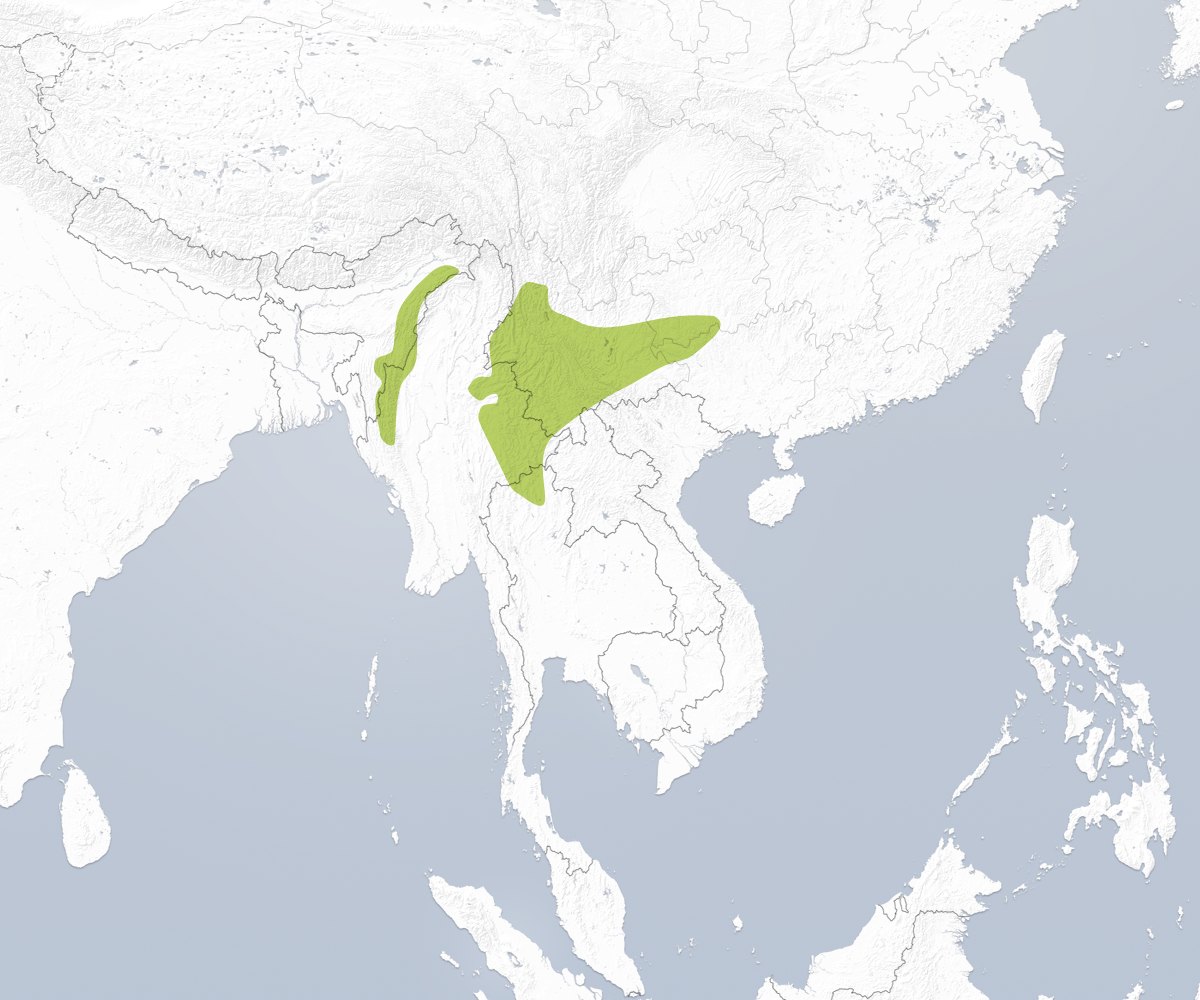

= Mrs. Hume's pheasant =

Mrs Hume's pheasant

State bird of Manipur; State bird of Mizoram

Mrs Hume's pheasant (Syrmaticus humiae) (Meitei: Nongin; literally, "one who follows the track of rain", Mizo: Vavu), also known as Hume's pheasant or the bar-tailed pheasant, is a large forest pheasant. It is the state bird of Mizoram and Manipur. The name commemorates Mary Ann Grindall Hume, wife of the British naturalist Allan Octavian Hume, one of the key founders of the Indian National Congress.

== Description ==
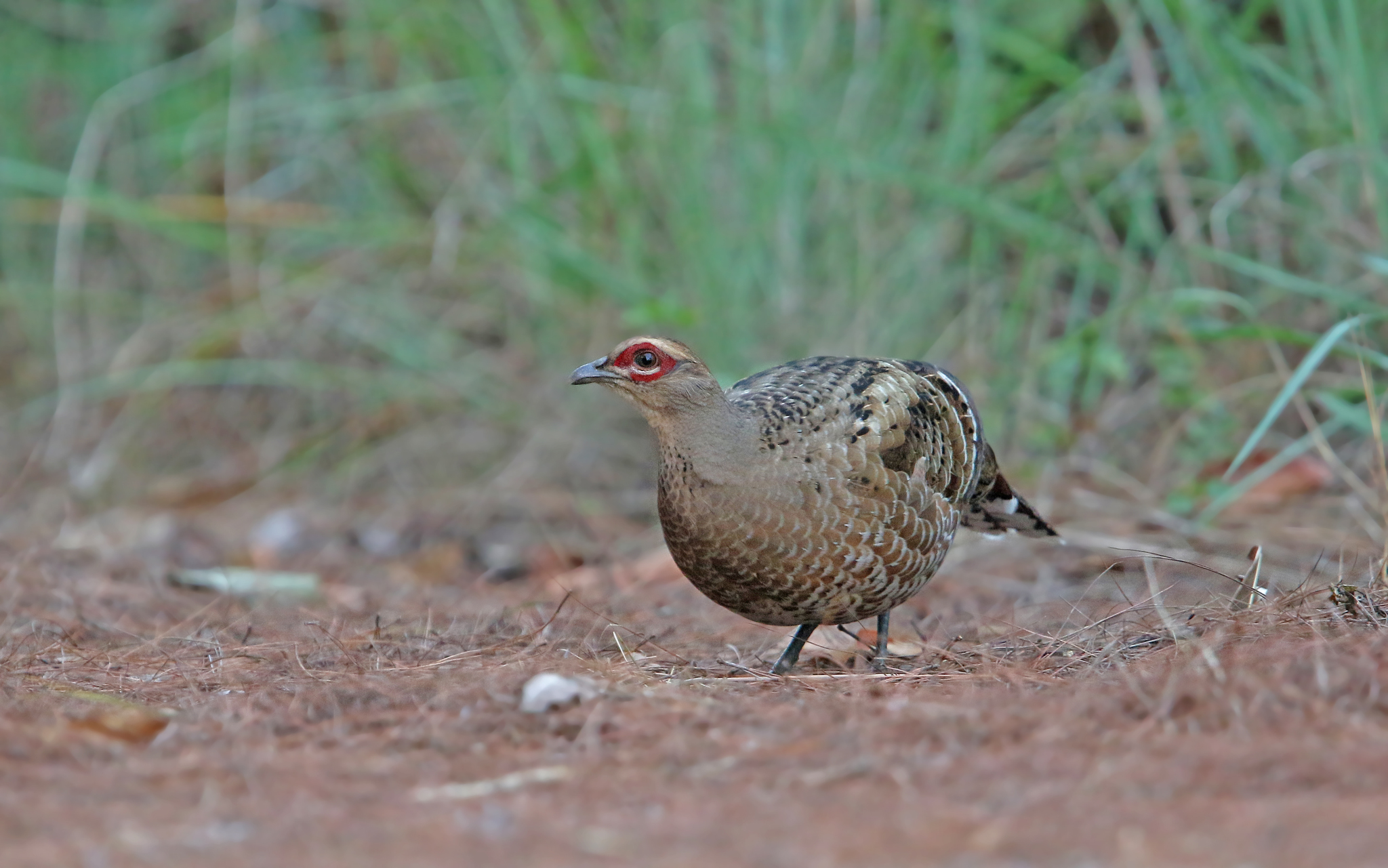
Female S. h. burmanicus

The pheasant is up to 90 cm (35 in) long with a greyish brown head, bare red facial skin, chestnut brown plumage, yellowish bill, brownish orange iris, white wingbars and metallic blue neck feathers. The male has a long greyish white, barred black and brown tail. The female is a chestnut brown bird with whitish throat, buff colour belly and white-tipped tail.

== Taxonomy ==
Mrs Hume's pheasant's has two recognised subspecies,

- Syrmaticus humiae humiae (Hume, 1881) - mountains of extreme northeast India (Arunachal Pradesh, Manipur, Mizoram, and Nagaland), and east to the Irrawaddy River in northwestern Myanmar.
- Syrmaticus humiae burmanicus (Oates, 1898) - South China (southwestern Yunnan, western Guangxi, and extreme southwestern Guizhou) and eastern Myanmar (east of Irrawaddy river) south to northwestern Thailand.

== Distribution and population ==
This rare and little known pheasant is found throughout forested habitats of Mizoram, Patkai Range, Manipur, Yunnan and northern parts of Myanmar and Thailand. Its diet consists mainly of vegetation matter. The female lays three to twelve creamy white eggs in nests made of leaves, twigs and feathers.

As a result of ongoing habitat loss, fragmented population, and being hunted for food, the Mrs. Hume's pheasant is evaluated as 'Vulnerable' on the IUCN Red List of Threatened Species. It is listed on Appendix I of CITES.
