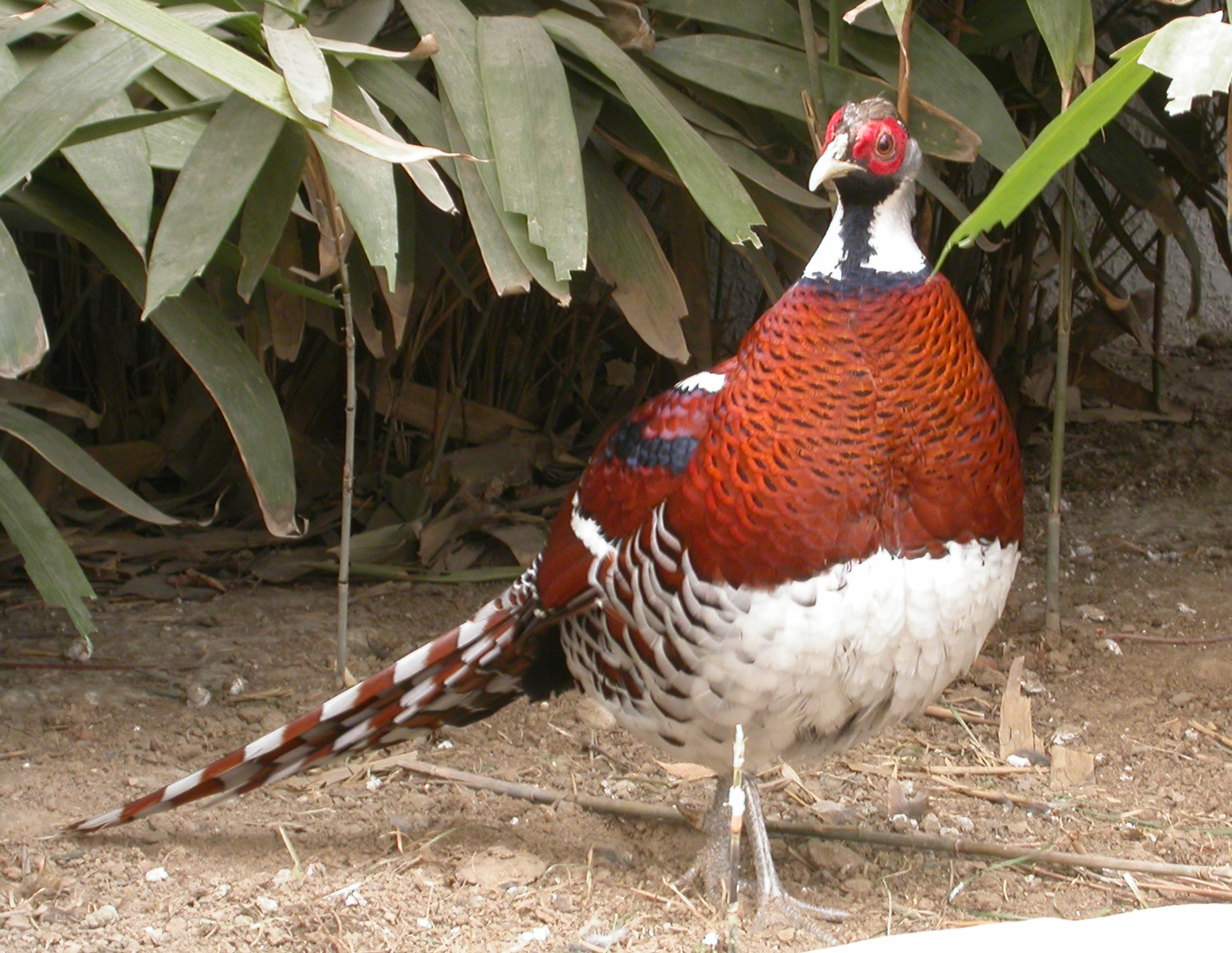
- At Beijing Zoo, China

Conservation status
- Least Concern (IUCN 3.1)
- CITES Appendix I

Scientific classification
- Kingdom: Animalia
- Phylum: Chordata
- Class: Aves
- Order: Galliformes
- Family: Phasianidae
- Genus: Syrmaticus
- Species: S. ellioti

Binomial name
- Syrmaticus ellioti (R. Swinhoe, 1872)

Synonyms
- Phasianus ellioti R. Swinhoe, 1872; Calophasis ellioti (R. Swinhoe, 1872)

= Elliot's pheasant =

Species of bird

Elliot's pheasant (Syrmaticus ellioti) is a large pheasant native to south-eastern China.

== Description ==
Males are up to 80 cm (31 in) long; they are brown and white with a black throat, chestnut-brown upper parts, white belly, nape and wing bars, red bare facial skin and long rusty-barred whitish tail. Females are smaller, at 50 cm (20 in) long; they are rufous brown with a blackish throat, whitish belly and less barred tail.

== Distribution ==
Elliot's pheasant is endemic to south-eastern China (Guizhou, Hubei, Anhui, Zhejiang, Fujian, Jiangxi, Hunan, Guangxi and Guangdong provinces), where it lives in evergreen and mountain forests at altitudes of 200–1,900 m (660–6,230 ft). Its diet consists mainly of seeds, leaves and berries.

== Behaviour and ecology ==
=== Breeding ===
Members of this breed are solitary animals, with the males especially being territorial. The courtship ritual involves males offering food and displaying. The average clutch size is between six and eight eggs. Eggs take a little under four weeks to hatch, while juvenile birds take approximately four months to mature.

=== Food and feeding ===
Wild pheasants forage for seeds, berries, leaves, and other similar plant matter. They have also been known to eat ants.

== Taxonomy ==
Elliot's pheasant was first described in 1872 by Robert Swinhoe, under the name "Phasianus ellioti"; the type material was from Ningbo, Zhejiang province, China. The specific epithet ellioti commemorates the American ornithologist Daniel Giraud Elliot; Swinhoe explained his choice thus:

"Possessed of so many striking characteristics, it would be easy to find an appropriate name for so marked a species; but on glancing down the list of Pheasants I find that not one bears the name of Elliot; and it strikes me it would be wrong to allow his magnificent work on the subject to close without the figure of a bird dedicated to himself" Alternative common names for the species include Chinese bar-backed pheasant and Chinese barred-backed pheasant.

== Conservation ==
Although there is ongoing habitat loss, and the population is decreasing, partly due to human subsistence hunting, Elliot's pheasant is evaluated as Least Concern on the IUCN Red List of Threatened Species, due to its large range and relatively gradual rate of decline. It is listed on Appendix I of CITES.

== See also ==
- List of endangered and protected species of China

== Bibliography ==
- Johnsgard, Paul A. (1999). The pheasants of the world: biology and natural history (2nd ed.). Washington, DC: Smithsonian Institution Press. pp. 262–264. ISBN 978-1-56098-839-7.
