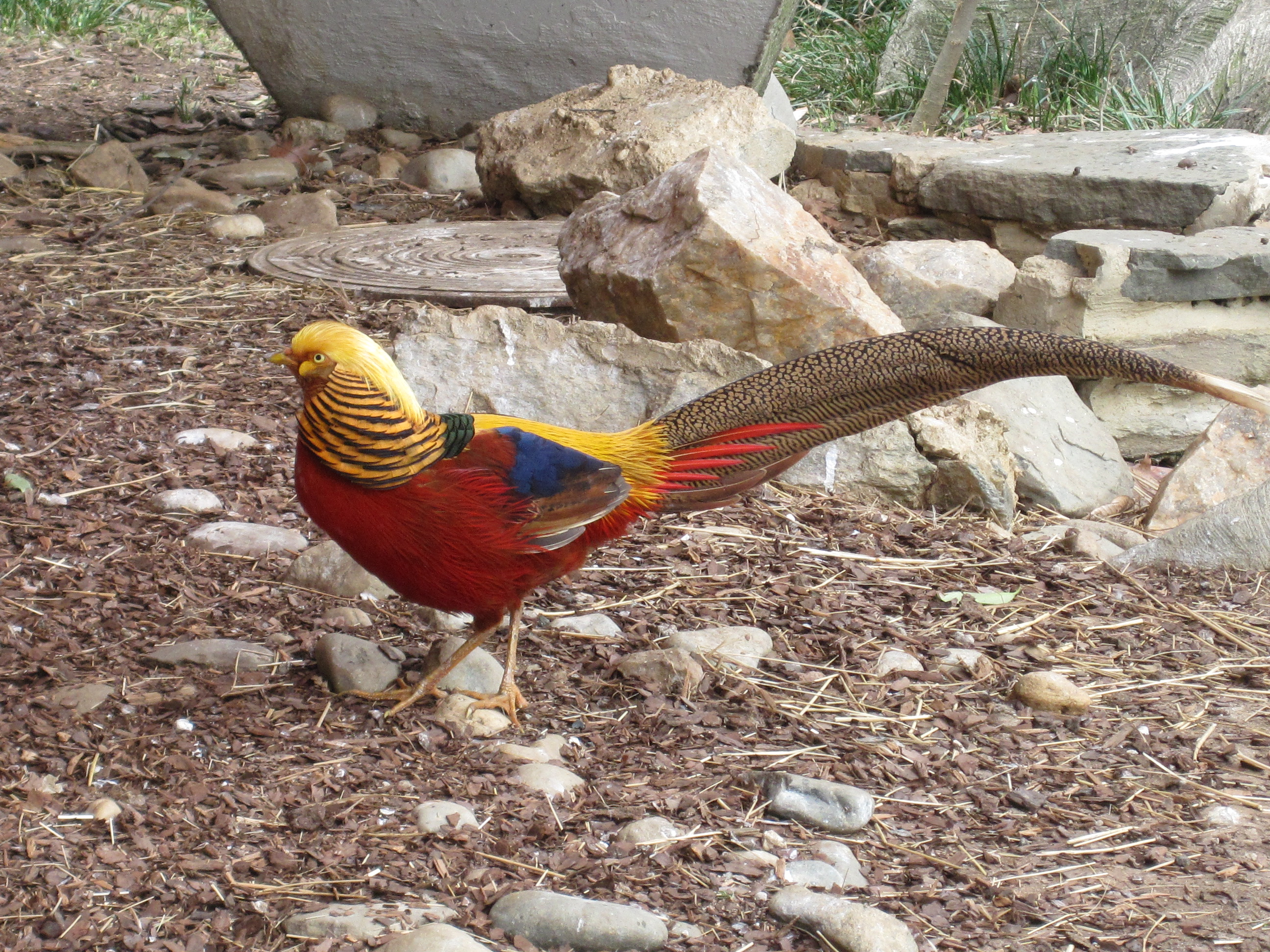
- Male golden pheasant

Scientific classification
- Kingdom: Animalia
- Phylum: Chordata
- Class: Aves
- Order: Galliformes
- Family: Phasianidae
- Tribe: Phasianini
- Genus: Chrysolophus; J.E. Gray, 1834

Type species
- Phasianus pictus Linnaeus, 1758

Species
- Golden pheasant, C. pictus; Lady Amherst's pheasant, C. amherstiae

= Chrysolophus =

Genus of birds

Chrysolophus is a genus of the pheasant family of birds. The genus name is from Ancient Greek khrusolophos, "with golden crest".

These species' males have spectacular plumag. The golden pheasant is native to western China, and Lady Amherst's pheasant to Tibet and westernmost China, but both have been widely introduced elsewhere. In places where self-supporting feral populations have become established, such as England, the two species can interbreed to produce hybrids.

Despite the male's showy appearance, these birds are very difficult to see in their natural habitat, which is dense, dark, young conifer forests with sparse undergrowth. Consequently, little is known of their behaviour in the wild.

They feed on the ground on grain, leaves, and invertebrates, but roost in trees at night. Whilst they can fly, they prefer to run, but if startled, they can suddenly burst upwards at great speed, with a distinctive wing sound.

== Taxonomy ==
The genus Chrysolophus was introduced in a figure caption by English zoologist John Edward Gray in 1834 for a single species, the golden pheasant (Phasianus pictus Linnaeus, 1758), which is therefore considered as the type species. The genus name is from Ancient Greek χρυσολοφος/khrusolophos, meaning with "golden crest", from χρυσος/khrusos meaning "gold" and λοφος/lophos meaning "crest". The genus now contains two species.

== Species ==
Genus Chrysolophus – J.E. Gray, 1834 – two species
Common name	Scientific name and subspecies	Range	Size and ecology	IUCN status and estimated population
Golden pheasant Male Female	Chrysolophus pictus (Linnaeus, 1758)	Western China, introduced to Canada, the United States, Britain, and elsewhere	Size: Habitat: Diet:	LC
Lady Amherst's pheasant Male Female	Chrysolophus amherstiae (Leadbeater, 1829)	Tibet and western China	Size: Habitat: Diet:	LC
