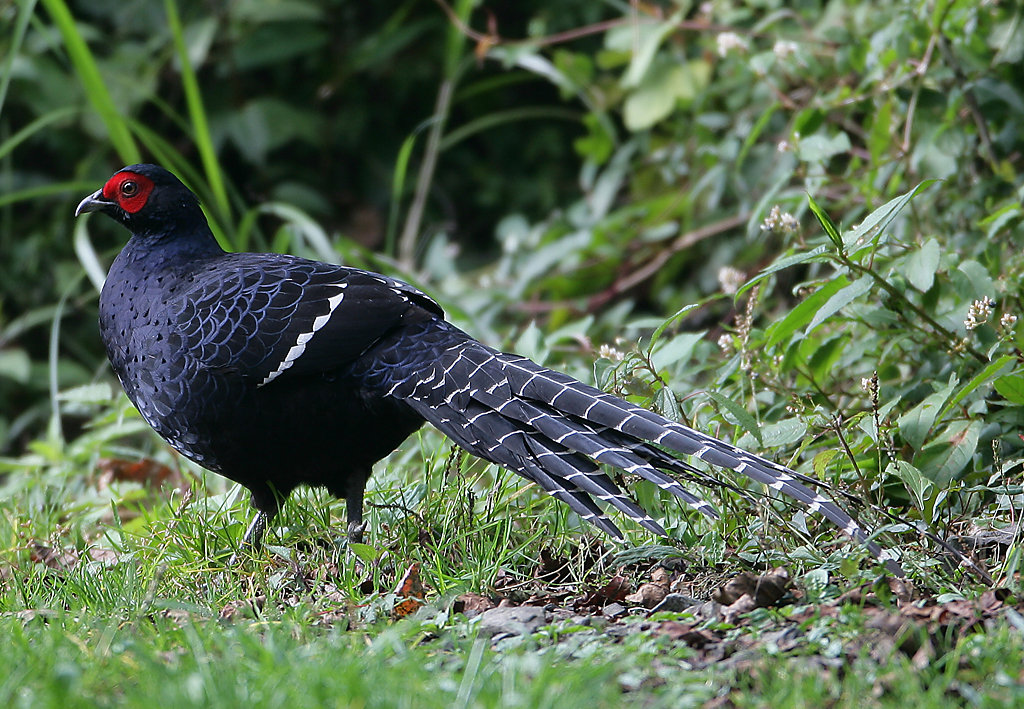
- Male
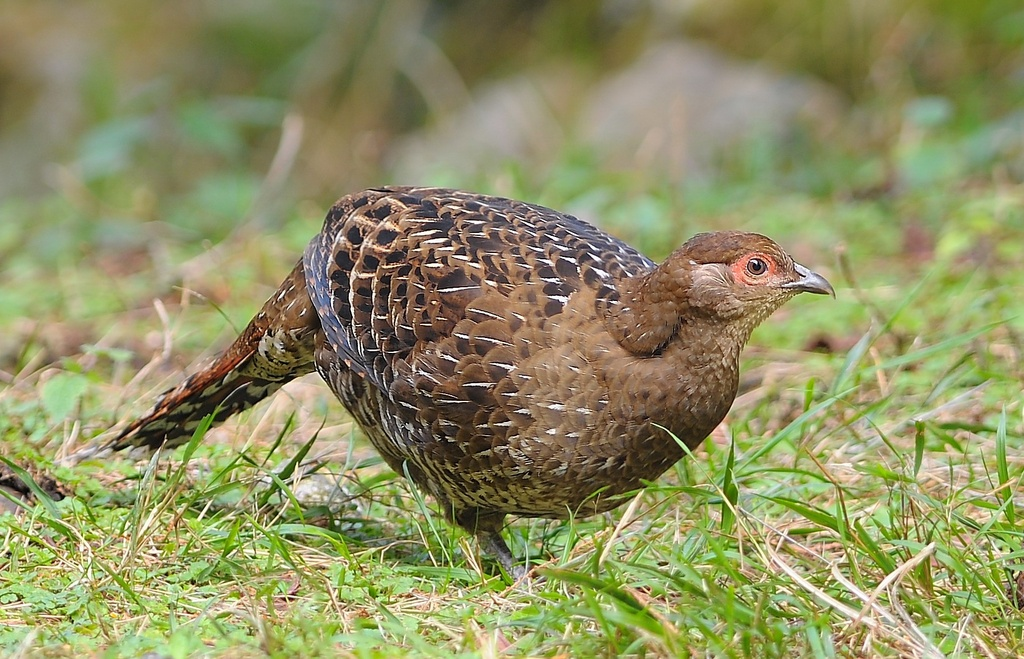
- Female

Conservation status
- Least Concern (IUCN 3.1)
- CITES Appendix I

Scientific classification
- Kingdom: Animalia
- Phylum: Chordata
- Class: Aves
- Order: Galliformes
- Family: Phasianidae
- Genus: Syrmaticus
- Species: S. mikado

Binomial name
- Syrmaticus mikado (Ogilvie-Grant, 1906)

Synonyms
- Calophasis mikado

= Mikado pheasant =

Species of bird

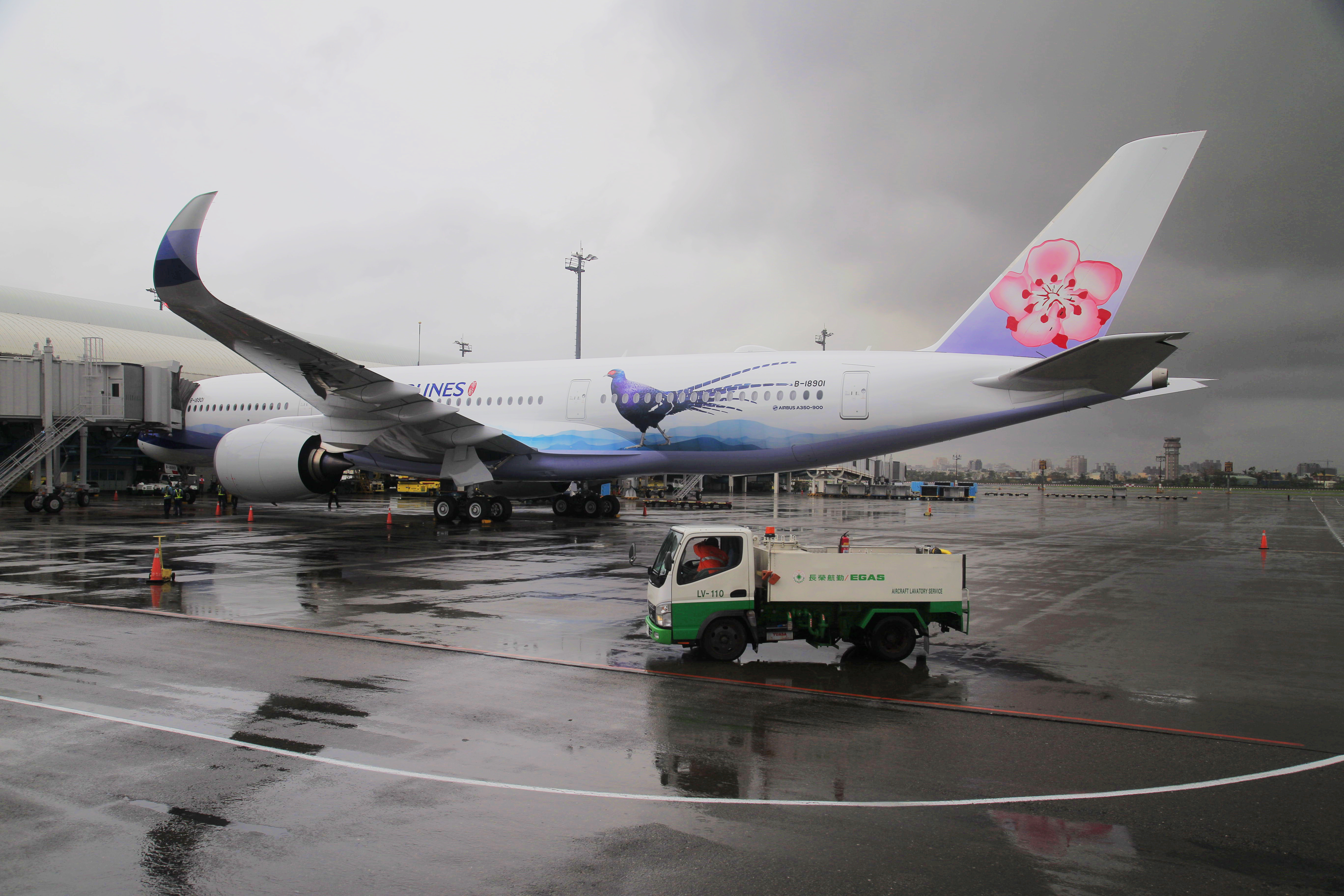
China Airlines Airbus A350-900 (B-18901) with Mikado Pheasant livery.

The Mikado pheasant (Syrmaticus mikado) is a species of gamebird in the pheasant family Phasianidae of the order Galliformes, gallinaceous birds. Sometimes considered an unofficial national bird of Taiwan (along with the Swinhoe's pheasant and Taiwan blue magpie), a pair of Mikado pheasants and Yushan National Park, one of the areas it is known to inhabit, is depicted in the 1000 dollar bill of the New Taiwan dollar.

== Distribution and habitat ==
The Mikado pheasant is endemic to mountainous regions of Taiwan. The species occupies dense shrubs, bamboo growth and grassy terrain with conifer overstory in central and southern Taiwan, from 2000 to 3200 meters above sea level.

== Description ==
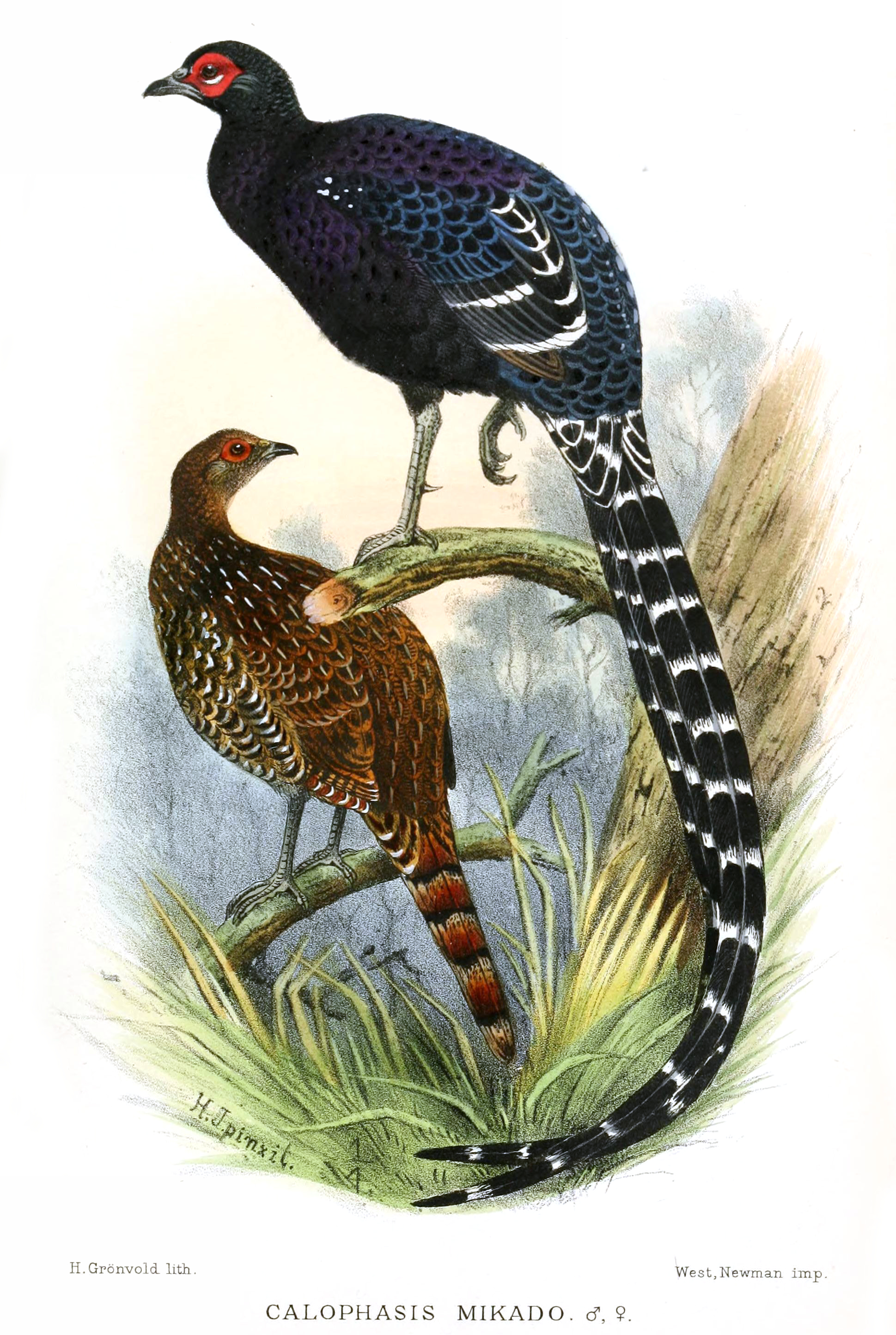

With the tail included, males of this species get to be up to 70 cm in body length, while the smaller females measure up to 47 cm. The male is dark with plumage that refracts with blue or violet iridescence, with white stripes on its wings and tail. The female is brown and speckled with brown and white quills. The long and striped tail feathers of the male were used by the Taiwanese aborigines as a head-dress decoration. The type specimen of the pheasant comprises two such tail feathers obtained in 1906 by collector Walter Goodfellow from the head-dress of one of his porters. It was named in honor of the Emperor of Japan, of which Taiwan was occupied by.

== Behavior ==
The pheasants will often come out into the open either in light rain or after heavy rain, where the mist conceals them. They tend to be solitary or found in pairs, often quiet, yet alert. They can usually tolerate the presence of humans and it is possible to observe them up close, especially in areas where they have become habituated to humans feeding them. When disturbed, they will slowly and cautiously seek out shelter within surrounding vegetation, rather than fluttering away in panic. If desperate, they will fly short distances, gliding down the mountainside. The males are territorial, with a range of 200–400 metres in radius. Both sexes make soft clucking sounds when feeding, and the males make ke, ke, ke calls when fighting for their mate or territory. Both sexes may perform a wing-whirring display, and during the breeding season the male performs a lateral running display with his body expanded and tail fanned.

The Mikado pheasant is crepuscular, and tends to explore open areas while foraging for food. The optimal times for observing this species are 5–6 a.m. and 6–7 p.m. However, the specific times for best observation may vary, depending on seasonal differences in sunrise and sunset times.

== Feeding ==
The pheasants will often walk and forage for food (a diet of various fruit, leaves, vegetation, seeds and invertebrates) at the same time, in a manner similar to chickens, on the forest floor and mountain trails, especially on rainy and foggy days.

== Vocalizations ==
There are five commonly heard vocalizations of the Mikado pheasant: a deep "gu, gu, gu" sound, which is the most frequently heard and often heard continuously when they are in a relaxed state, while walking or pecking the ground. Another vocalization is a higher-pitched "ko, ko, ko," typically produced during the mating season or when they sense nearby threat. The "ji, ji" vocalization occurs slightly less frequently than the previous two and is often heard when they perceive immediate danger from intruders. The "cu, cu" sound is the highest-pitched vocalization made by the Mikado pheasant and is usually heard when they are startled and take flight. It is similar to the aforementioned "ji" sound. Another vocalization, "hu, hu," is produced when launching an attack using their beak and claws. This vocalization is distinct from the previous four and appears to be generated by expelling air from their beaks, whereas the first four are produced by the vocal muscles in the syrinx.

== Breeding ==
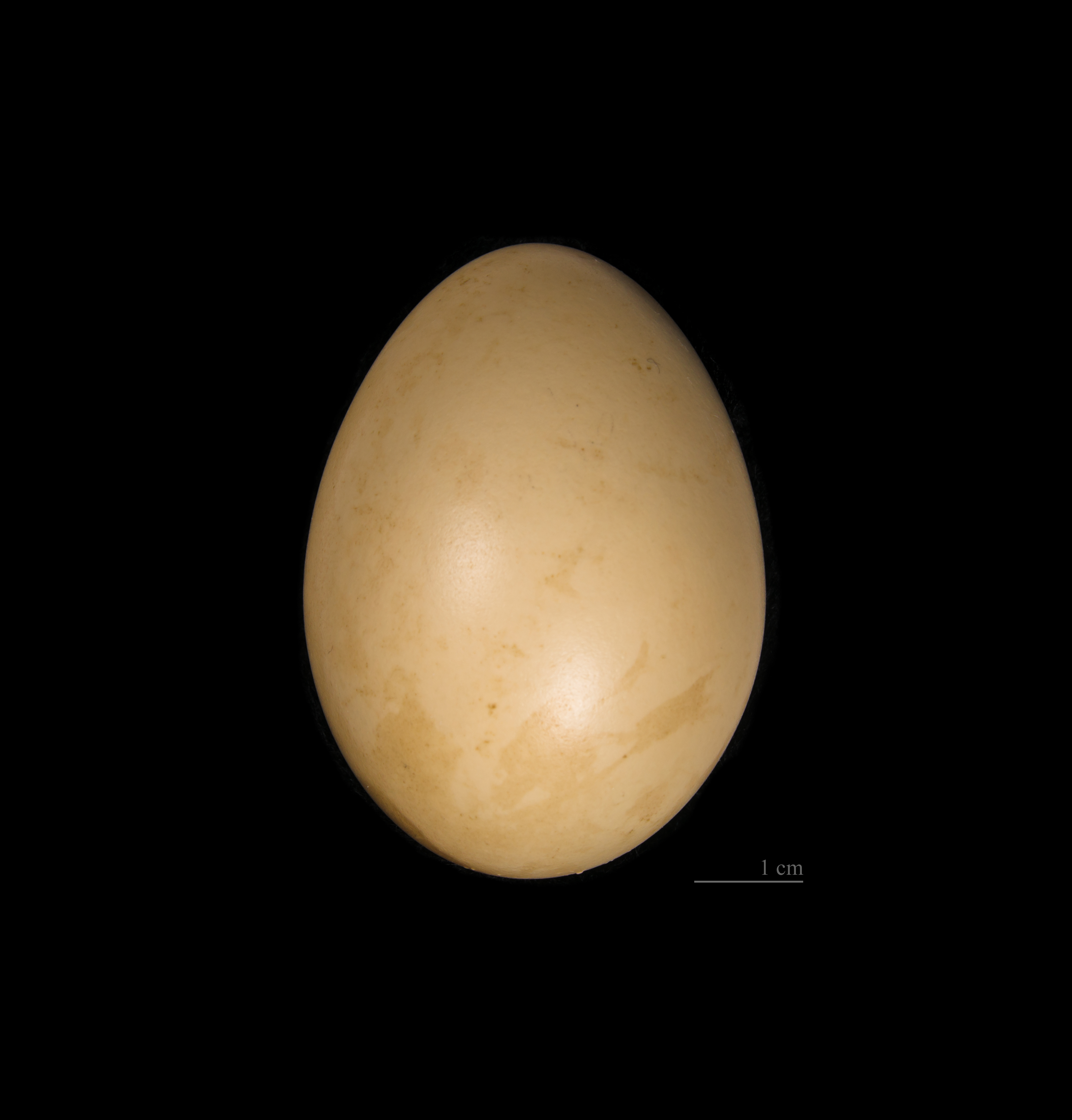
Syrmaticus mikado - MHNT

The breeding season of Mikado pheasants lasts from March to June. Mikado pheasants build their nests mainly with dead branches, fallen leaves, dry grass and feathers in tree holes or depressions under rocks. Females usually lay three to eight creamy-colored eggs at one time and it is they who are solely responsible for the incubation of the eggs (which take about 26–28 days to hatch) and the nurture of fledglings, once they are born. The young are usually independent by six months the latest.

== Conservation status ==
The wild population of this species is believed to have been quite underestimated, with 10,000 individuals alone expected to reside in the Yushan National Park. As of 2023, the total population is estimated to be 20,000-100,000 mature individuals, and this population is believed to be stable. The Mikado pheasant is evaluated as Least Concern on the IUCN Red List of Threatened Species. It is listed on Appendix I of CITES.

Under protection numbers have increased with numbers within Yushan National Park increasing from 5,000 in 1986 to more than 10,000 in 2020. There are also significant recovered populations in Shei-Pa National Park and Taroko National Park.

== See also ==
- List of protected species in Taiwan
- List of endemic species of Taiwan
- List of endemic birds of Taiwan
