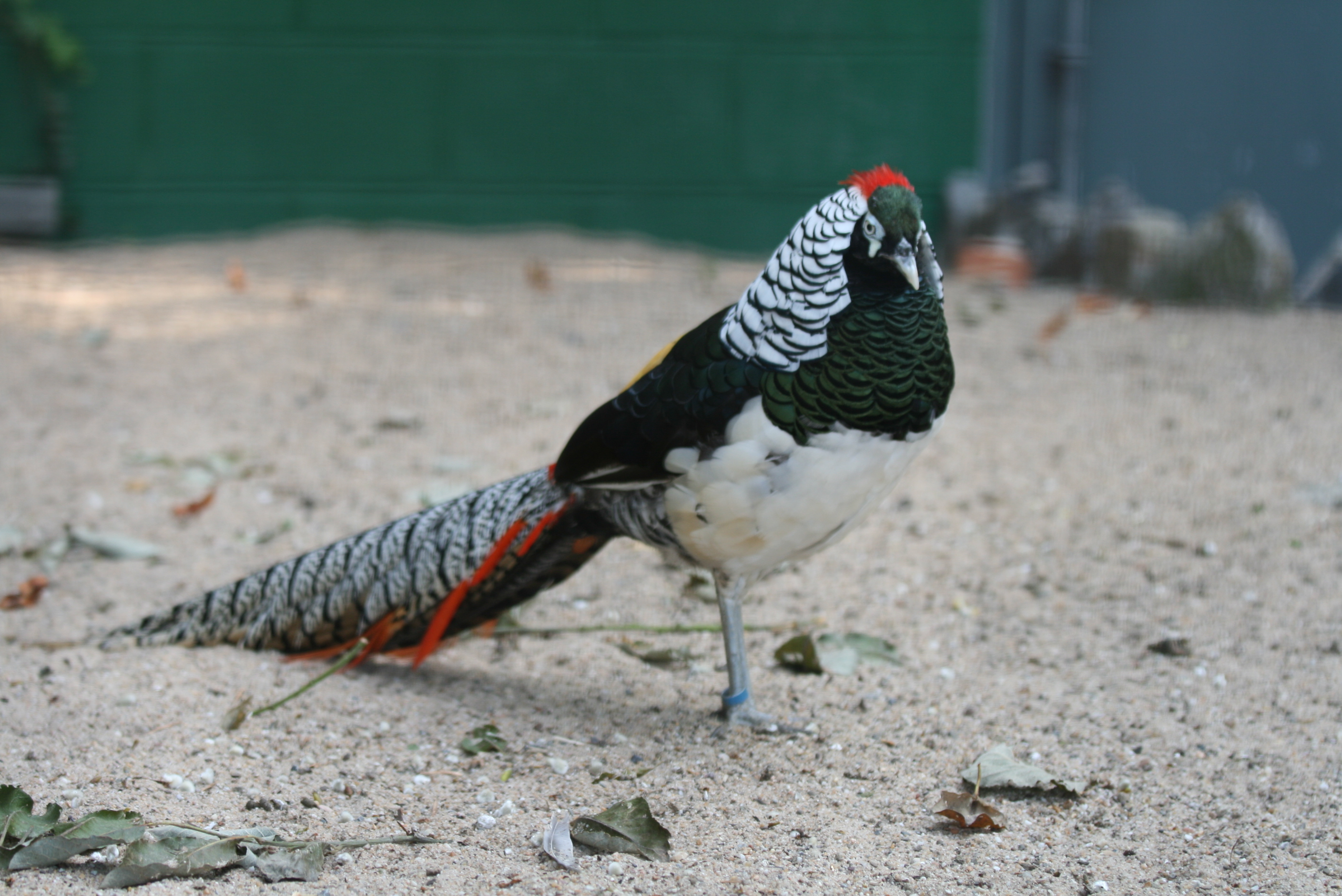
- Male at Parc Paradisio, Hainaut, Belgium
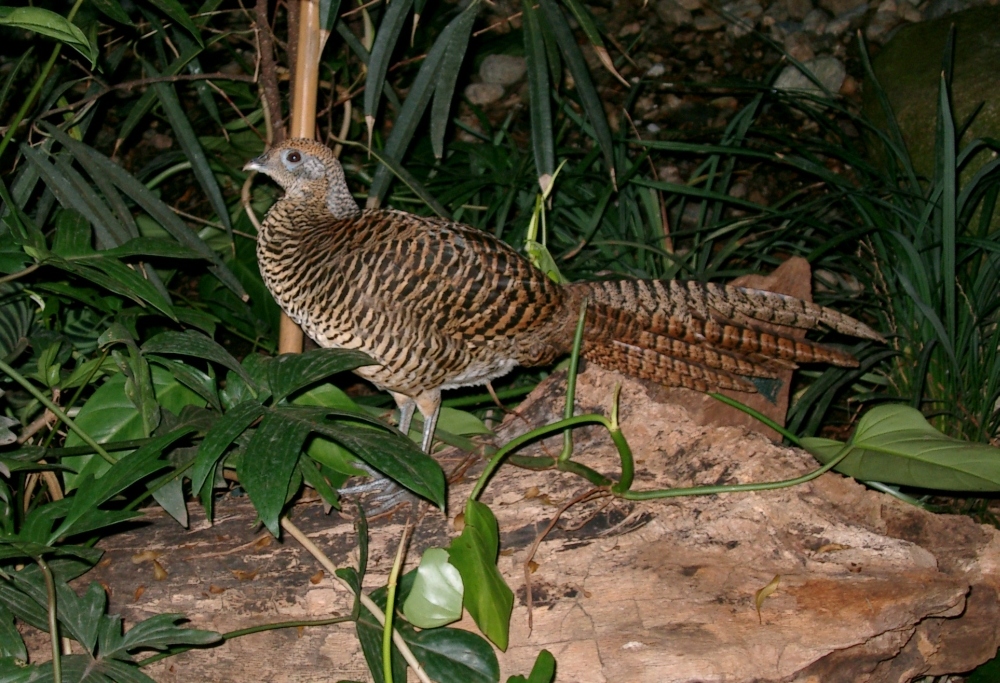
- Female

Conservation status
- Least Concern (IUCN 3.1)

Scientific classification
- Kingdom: Animalia
- Phylum: Chordata
- Class: Aves
- Order: Galliformes
- Family: Phasianidae
- Genus: Chrysolophus
- Species: C. amherstiae

Binomial name
- Chrysolophus amherstiae (Leadbeater, 1829)
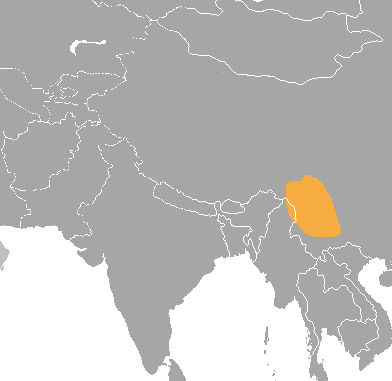
- Lady Amherst's Pheasant Chrysolophus amherstiae, range map

= Lady Amherst's pheasant =

Species of bird

Lady Amherst's pheasant (Chrysolophus amherstiae) is a bird of the order Galliformes and the family Phasianidae. The genus name is from the Ancient Greek: χρυσόλόφος chrusolophos, "with golden crest". The English name and amherstiae commemorates Sarah Amherst, who was responsible for sending the first specimen of the bird to London in 1828. It is also sometimes referred to as the Chinese copper pheasant. Lady Amherst's pheasant is evaluated as Least Concern on the IUCN Red List of Threatened Species.

== Distribution and habitat ==
The species is native to southwestern China and far northern Myanmar, but has been introduced elsewhere.

A self-supporting feral population was established in England, the stronghold of which was in west Bedfordshire. Sarah Amherst, Countess Amherst first introduced the ornamental pheasant on her estates, near the Duke of Bedford's Woburn Abbey, where the birds were also shot for game and interbred. Although the introduced British populations are believed to have been locally extinct since 2015, occasional sightings of the species have occurred in subsequent years throughout the UK; likely due to escapees from private collections.

While populations of Lady Amherst's pheasants were established in England, they were recorded to interbreed extensively with the larger populations of introduced golden pheasants and, to a more limited degree, with common pheasants. Most of the existing populations of golden pheasants have at least trace ancestry from Lady Amherst's pheasants.

Reasons for the decline in the species in England include predation by the Eurasian goshawk, which had been largely absent from the island when the pheasants were introduced; destruction of woodland understorey by browsing by Reeves's muntjac, another introduced species; and loss of habitat due to the increased felling of hardwood forests and their replacement with understorey-less commercial softwoods and increased human recreational use of other woods. Loss of wildlife corridors also isolated remaining populations from one another.

== Description ==
The adult male is 100–120 cm (39.5–47 in) in length, its tail accounting for 80 cm (31 in) of the total length. It is unmistakable with its nuchal cape which is white black, with a red crest. The long tail is greyish white with black bars and red streaks at the base, the chest and belly are white, the throat is scaled green, the back is dark green, the wings are blue and brown, and the rump is yellow. The "cape" can be raised in display. This species is closely related to the golden pheasant (C. pictus), but slightly larger and has a yellow eye, blue-green bare skin around it. The bill is horn-coloured and they have blue-gray legs.

The female is much less showy, with a duller mottled brown plumage all over, similar to that of the female common pheasant (P. colchicus) but with finer barring. She is very like the female golden pheasant, but has a darker head and cleaner underparts than the hen of that species.

Despite the male's showy appearance, these birds are very difficult to see in their natural habitat, which is dense, dark forests with thick undergrowth. Consequently, little is known of their behaviour in the wild.

== Diet and behaviour ==
They feed on the ground on grain, leaves and invertebrates, but roost in trees at night. Whilst they can fly, they prefer to run, but if startled they can suddenly burst upwards at great speed, with a distinctive wing sound. The male emits a metallic call in the breeding season.

== Gallery ==
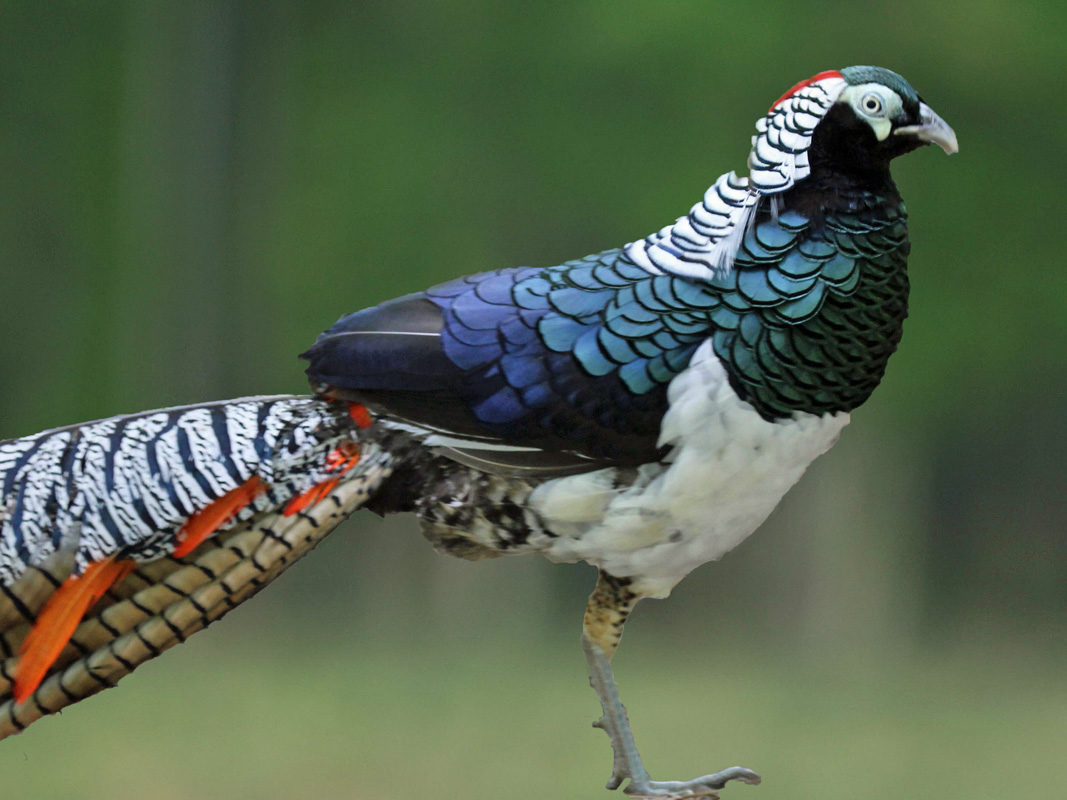
Male

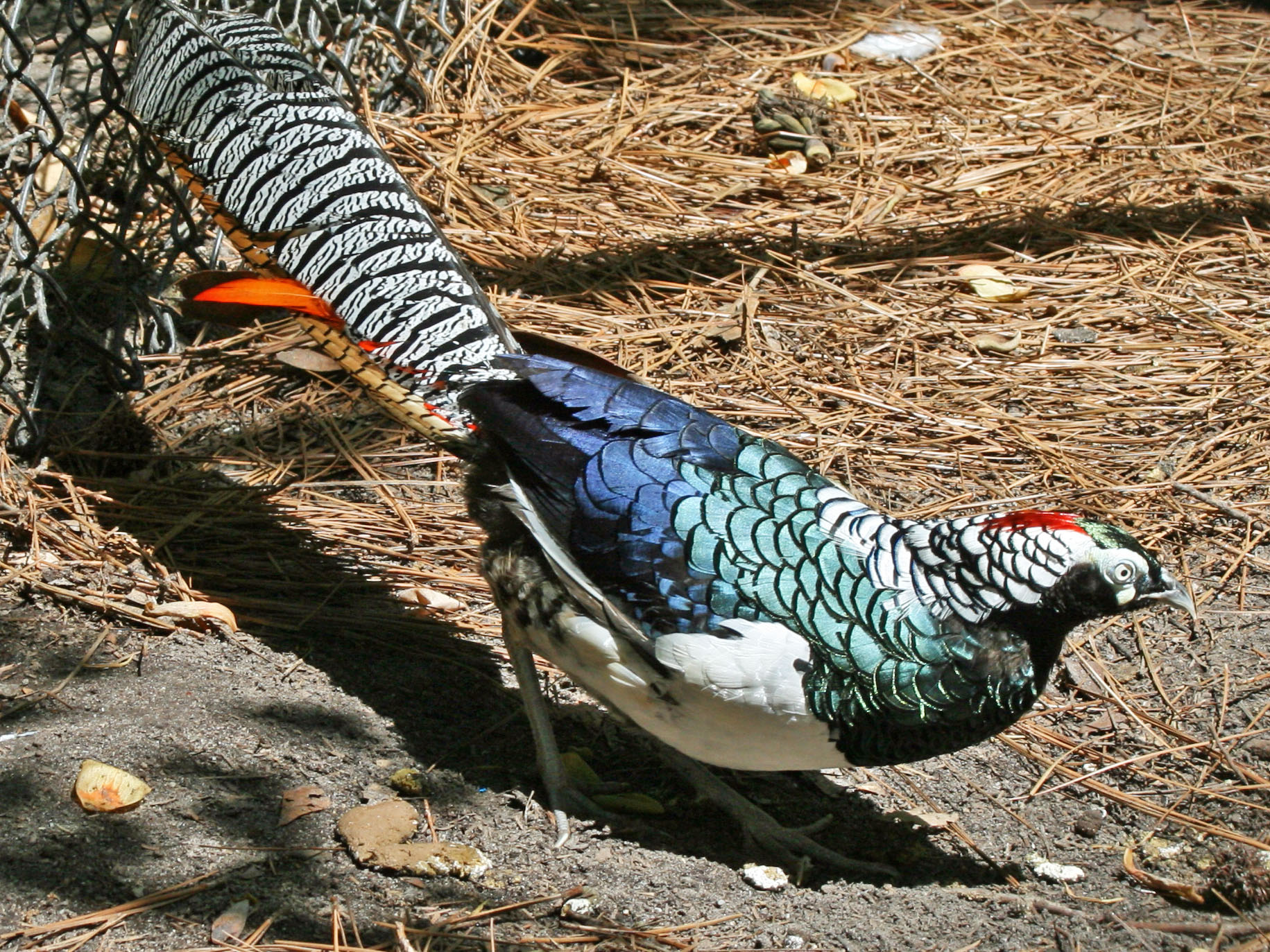
Male

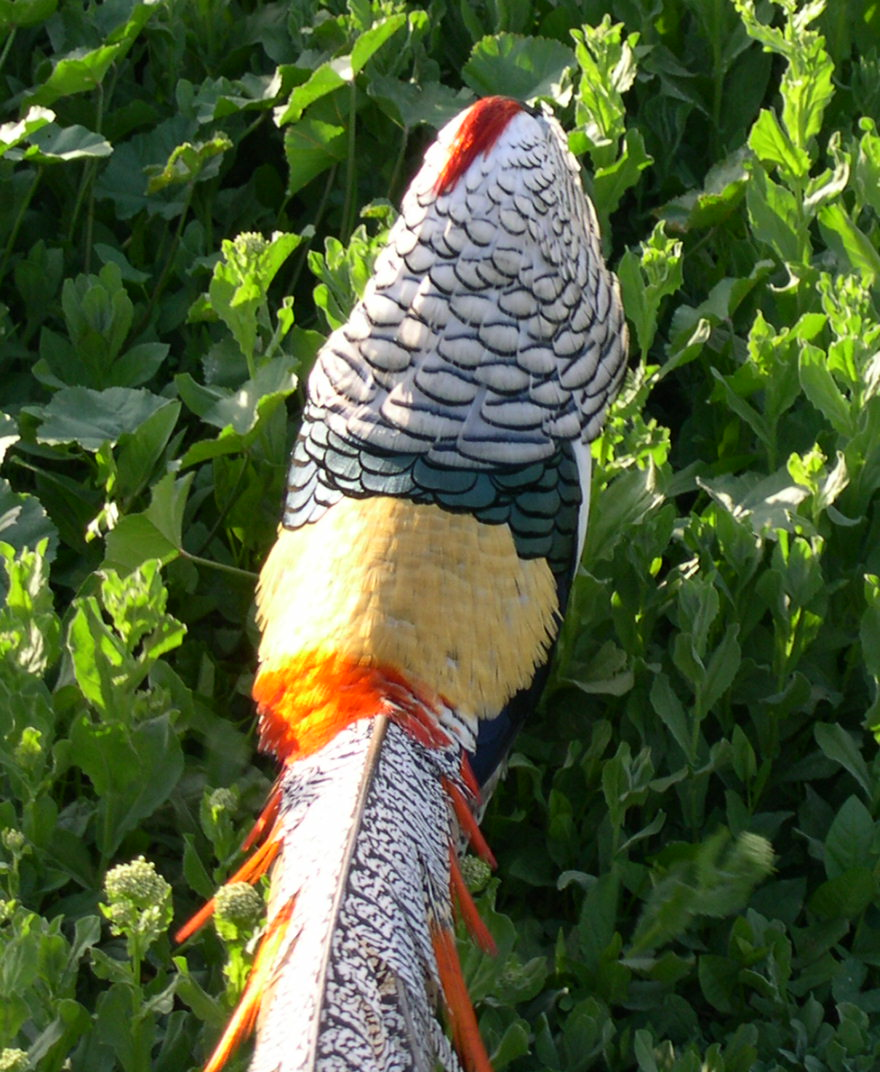
back view

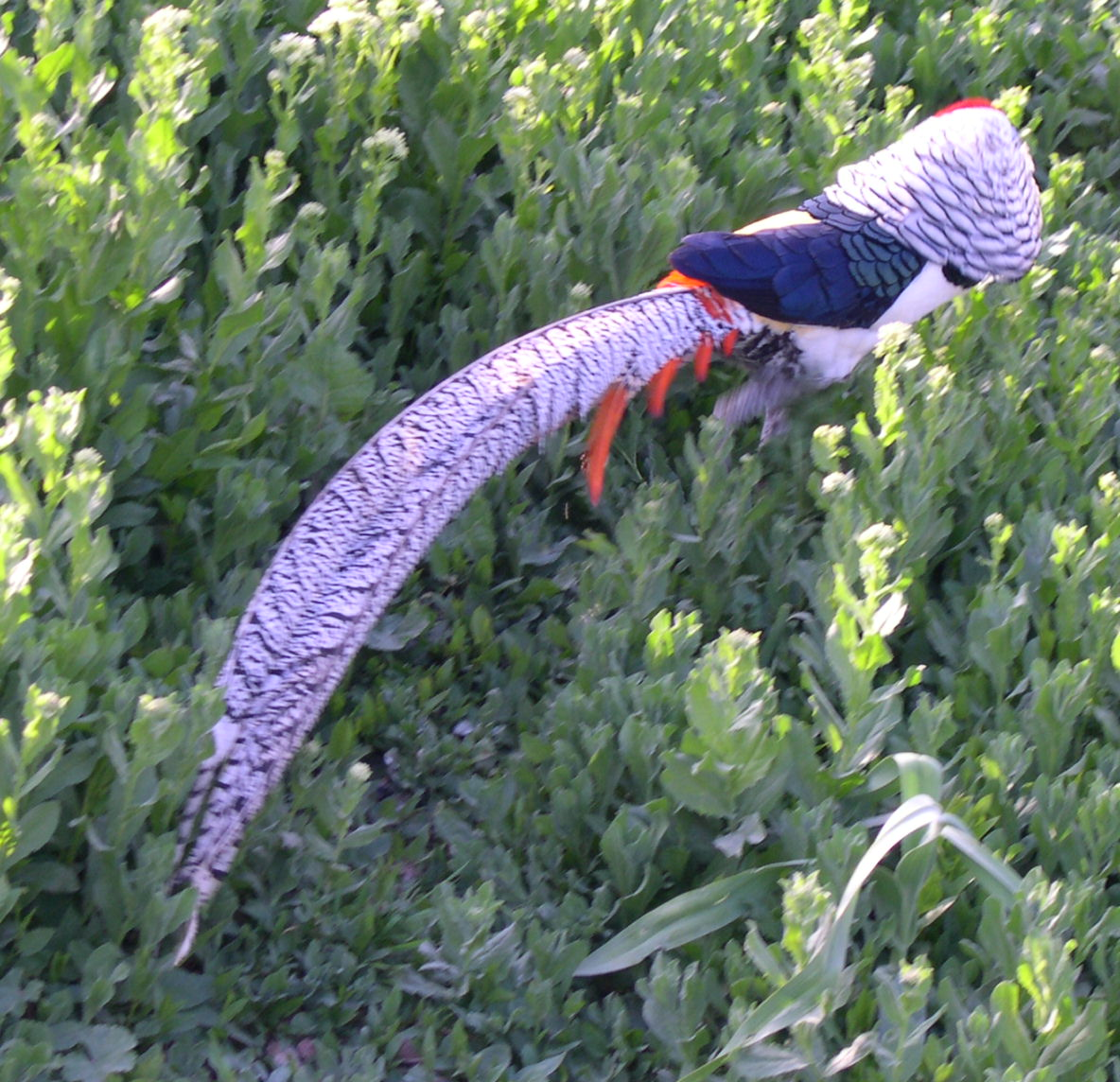
side view

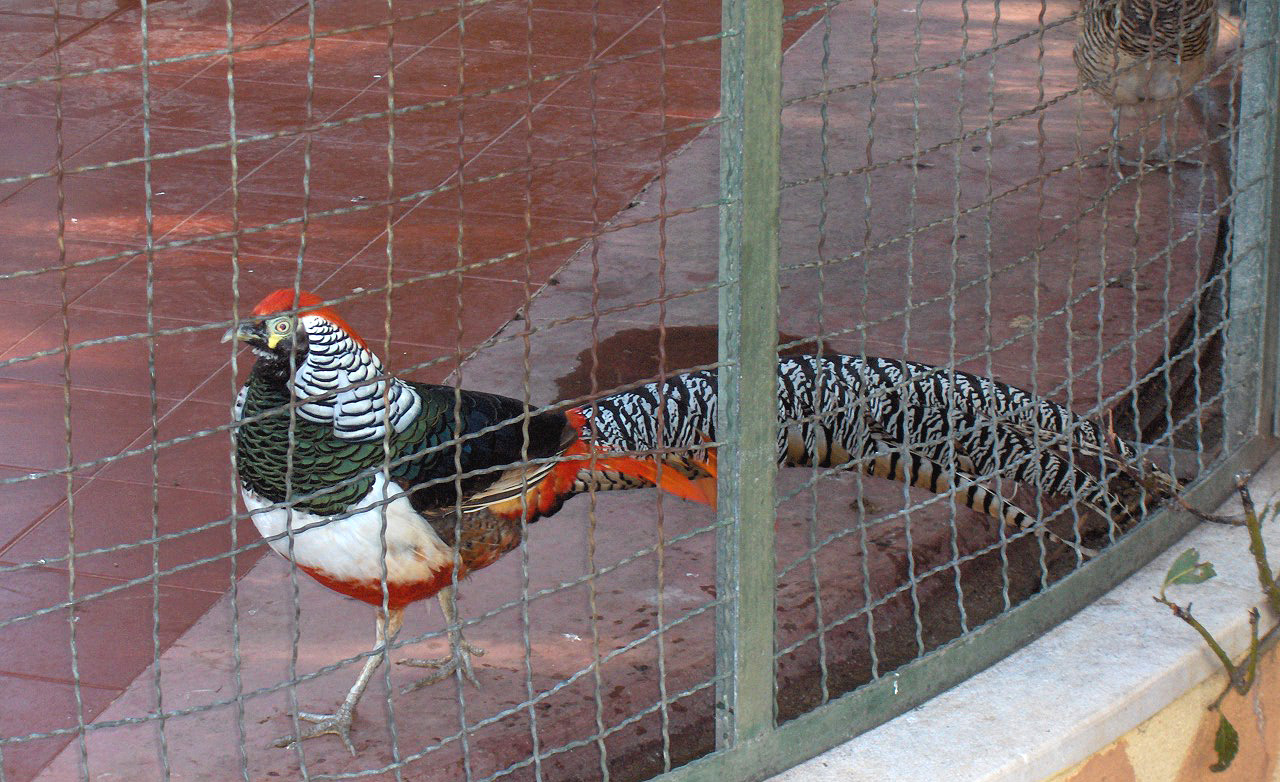
Lady Amherst's x golden pheasant cross. In a pure Lady Amherst's pheasant, the red crest starts roughly halfway between the cere to the crest tip (not at the beak), and the belly would be all white without any red or brown tainting.

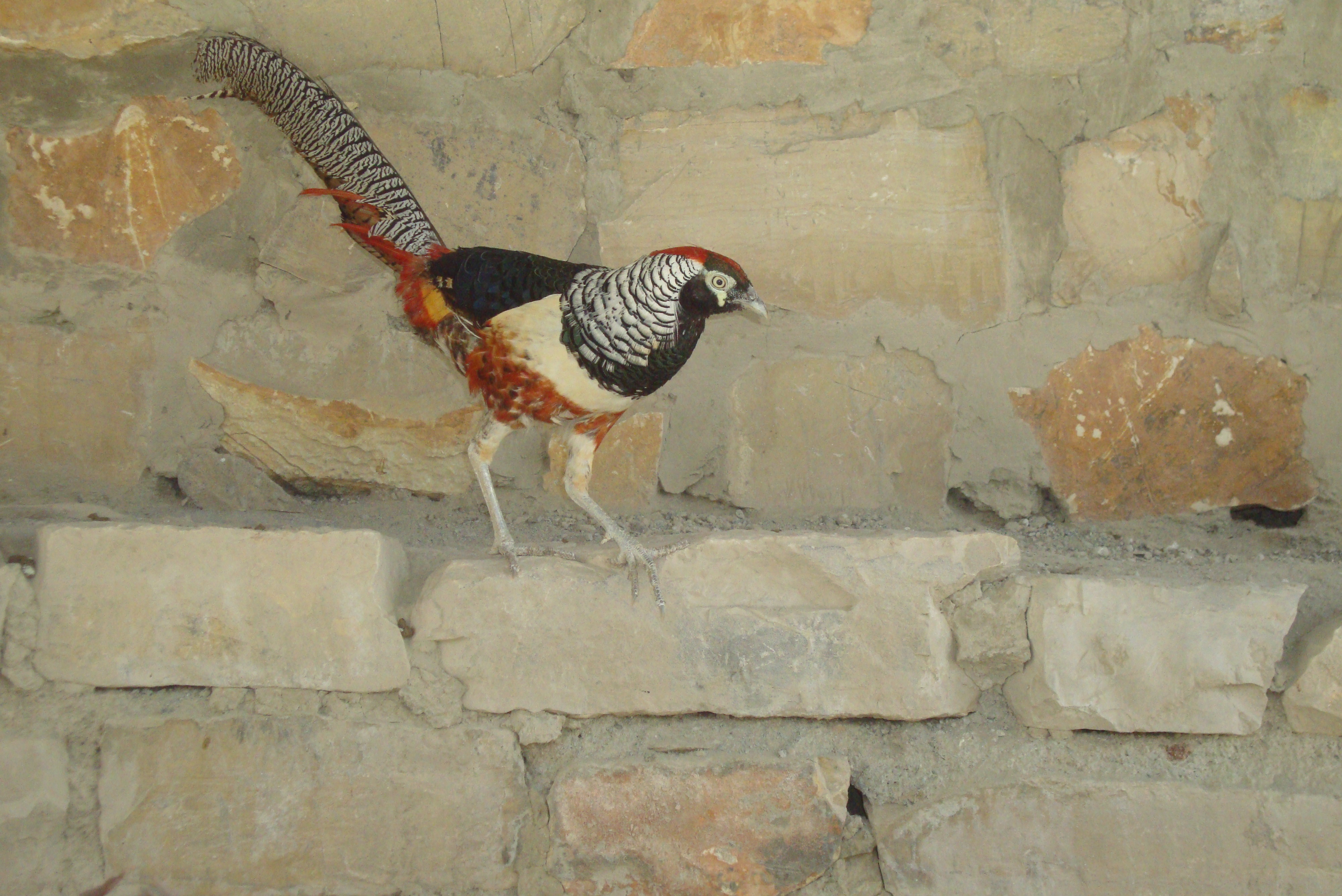
The same, Chrysolophus pictus x Chrysolophus amherstiae
