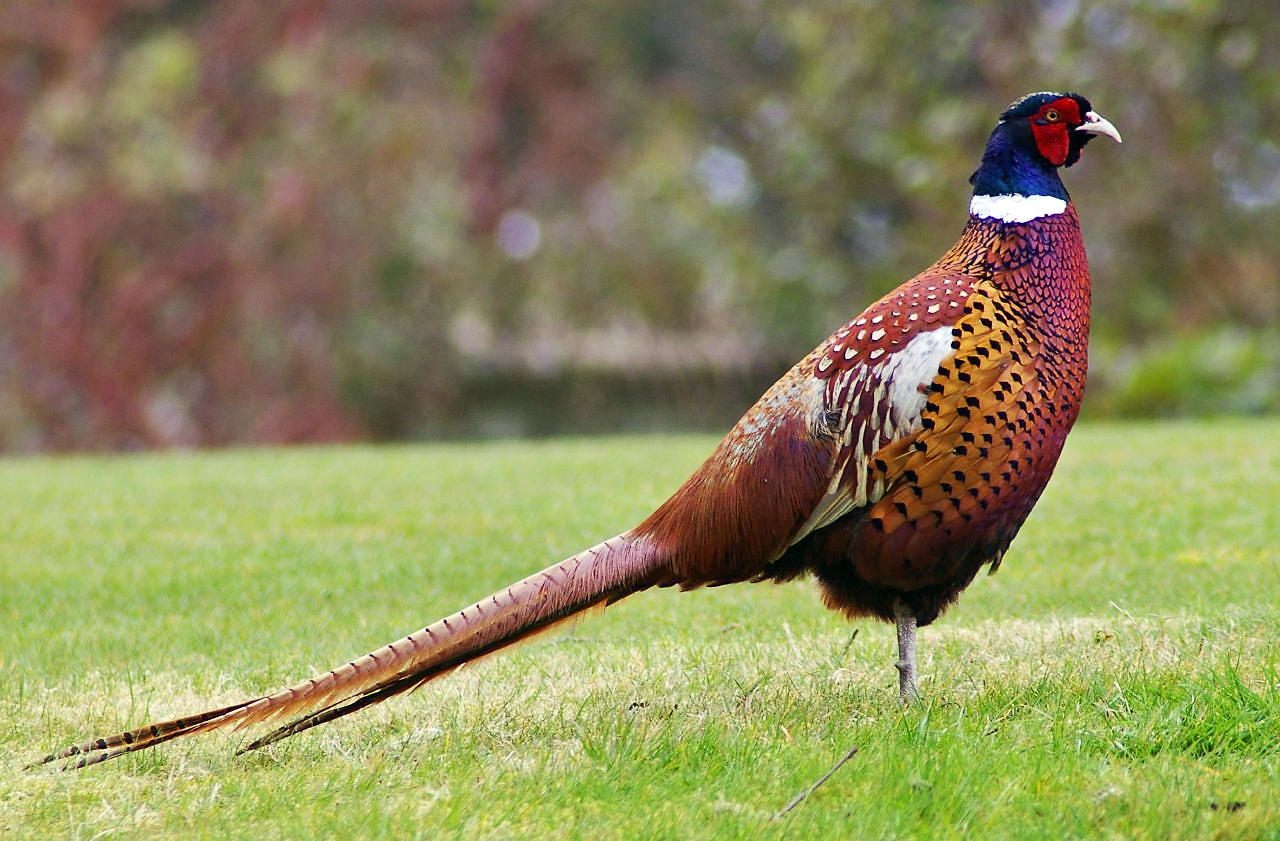
- Mongolian ringneck-type common pheasant male

Scientific classification
- Kingdom: Animalia
- Phylum: Chordata
- Class: Aves
- Order: Galliformes
- Superfamily: Phasianoidea
- Family: Phasianidae

Groups included
- Ithaginis; Pucrasia; Phasianini; Polyplectron; Argusianina

Cladistically included but traditionally excluded taxa
- Rollulinae; Lerwini; Lophophorini; Meleagridini; Tetraonini; Rhizotherini; Perdix; Coturnicini; Gallini; Pavonina; Galloperdix; Haematortyx; Tropicoperdix

= Pheasant =

Bird in family Phasianidae

Pheasants (/ˈfɛzənts/ FEZ-ənts) are birds of several genera within the family Phasianidae in the order Galliformes. Although they can be found all over the world in introduced (and captive) populations, the pheasant genera's native range is restricted to Eurasia. The classification "pheasant" is paraphyletic, as birds referred to as pheasants are included within both the subfamilies Phasianinae and Pavoninae, and in many cases are more closely related to smaller phasianids, grouse, and turkey (formerly classified in Perdicinae, Tetraoninae, and Meleagridinae) than to other pheasants.

Pheasants eat mostly seeds, grains, roots, and berries, while in the summer they take advantage of insects, fresh green shoots, spiders, earthworms, and snails. However, as an introduced species, in the UK they have been reported as a potential threat to endangered native adders.

The best-known is the common pheasant, which is widespread throughout the world, in introduced feral populations and in farm operations. They are the most popular game bird in many parts of the United States. Various other pheasant species are popular in aviaries, such as the golden pheasant (Chrysolophus pictus).

== Etymology ==
According to the Oxford English Dictionary, the word "pheasant" ultimately comes from Phasis, the ancient name of the Rioni River in Georgia. It passed from Greek to Latin to French (spelled with an initial "f") then to English, appearing for the first time in English around 1299.

== Behavior ==
Pheasants are typically solitary or form small, loose flocks. Females often group together, and males remain alone once sexually mature. Harem members for a particular male can be from the same, or different, flocks. Bachelor males may form small groups while maturing.

Females spend a majority of their time in the late Spring and early Summer incubating eggs. Flocking behavior increases during non-mating parts of the year.

Crowing is the territorial call of the male. The call may attract females, or warn other males. Dusk and dawn are preferred times, and the amount is not changed by weather.

== Reproduction ==
Pheasants have a seasonal breeding cycle, occurring most often in the spring or early summer when food is the most abundant. Pheasants are characterised by strong sexual dimorphism, males being highly decorated with bright colours and adornments such as wattles. Males are usually larger than females and have longer tails. The social structure is usually polygynous, in which one male establishes a territory and attracts females. The courtship display includes elaborate mating displays: bright plumage, vocalization and wing-flapping. Males will also fight over females.

The female builds a ground nest, often hidden in tall grass, bushes or logs. A clutch is usually 8-15 olive-brown eggs, and will incubate for 22-28 days. One brood is produced per year. Males do not participate in nesting or chick-rearing.

Pheasants have been reported nest-parasites of other ground-nesting birds. The female may lay eggs near a nest of another bird, and leave them for another to incubate, feed, and care for. The pheasant eggs typically hatch before their own, ensuring the pheasant chicks get superior care. Prairie chickens are a known victim species.

== Ecology ==
Native to Eurasia as a Family, Phasianinae has worldwide distribution, and has become naturalized to many environments.

Although releasing species into new areas is controversial, pheasant species have overall been shown to have a benign to beneficial effect for ecosystems they are introduced to.

Pheasants were introduced in California in the late 19th-century, and incredibly successful in areas producing cereal grain crops with wetlands, fencerows or headlands. Pheasant hunting became an economically significant past-time with harvests reaching half a million birds in the 1960s. More recent studies show sharp declines in pheasant populations over the last 25 years. Habitat loss has been cited as the main reason for these declines.

Introduced to Illinois around 1890. They inhabit the northern half of the state, mostly on farms, hay fields and marshes.

== Species in taxonomic order ==
This list is ordered to show presumed relationships between species.

- Subfamily Phasianinae
  - Tribe Ithaginini
    - Blood pheasant (genus Ithaginis)
      - Blood pheasant (I. cruentus)
  - Tribe Pucrasiini
    - Koklass (genus Pucrasia)
      - Koklass pheasant (P. macrolopha)
  - Tribe Phasianini
    - Long-tailed pheasants (genus Syrmaticus)
      - Reeves's pheasant (S. reevesi)
      - Elliot's pheasant (S. ellioti)
      - Mrs. Hume's pheasant (S. humiae)
      - Mikado pheasant (S. mikado)
      - Copper pheasant (S. soemmerringi)
    - Ruffed pheasants (genus Chrysolophus)
      - Golden pheasant (C. pictus)
      - Lady Amherst's pheasant (C. amherstiae)
    - Typical pheasants (genus Phasianus)
      - Green pheasant (P. versicolor)
      - Common pheasant (P. colchicus)
        - Caucasus pheasants, Phasianus colchicus colchicus group
        - White-winged pheasants, Phasianus colchicus chrysomelas/principalis group
          - Prince of Wales pheasant, Phasianus colchicus principalis
        - Mongolian ring-necked pheasants or white-winged ring-necked pheasants, Phasianus colchicus mongolicus group
        - Tarim pheasants, Phasianus colchicus tarimensis group
        - Chinese ring-necked pheasants, Phasianus colchicus torquatus group
          - Taiwan pheasant, Phasianus colchicus formosanus
  - Cheer pheasant (genus Catreus)
    - Cheer pheasant (C. wallichi)
  - Gallopheasants (genus Lophura)
    - Kalij pheasant (L. leucomelanos)
      - White-crested kalij pheasant (L. l. hamiltoni)
      - Nepal kalij pheasant (L. l. leucomelanos)
      - Black-backed kalij pheasant (L. l. melanota)
      - Black kalij pheasant (L. l. moffitti)
      - Black-breasted kalij pheasant (L. l. lathami)
      - William's kalij pheasant (L. l. williamsi)
      - Oates' kalij pheasant (L. l. oatesi)
      - Crawfurd's kalij pheasant (L. l. crawfurdi)
      - Lineated kalij pheasant (L. l. lineata)
    - Silver pheasant (L. nycthemera)
    - Imperial pheasant (L. imperialis)
    - Edwards's pheasant (L. edwardsi)
    - Vietnamese pheasant (L. hatinhensis)
    - Swinhoe's pheasant (L. swinhoii)
    - Salvadori's pheasant (L. inornata)
      - Hoogerwerf's pheasant (L. i. hoogerwerfi)
    - Malayan crestless fireback (L. erythrophthalma)
    - Bornean crestless fireback (L. pyronota)
    - Bornean crested fireback (L. ignita)
      - Lesser Bornean crested fireback (L. i. ignita)
      - Greater Bornean crested fireback (L. i. nobilis)
    - Malayan crested fireback (L. rufa)
    - Siamese fireback (L. diardi)
    - Bulwer's pheasant (L. bulweri)
  - Eared pheasants (genus Crossoptilon)
    - White eared pheasant (C. crossoptilon)
    - Tibetan eared pheasant (C. harmani)
    - Brown eared pheasant (C. mantchuricum)
    - Blue eared pheasant (C. auritum)
- Subfamily Pavoninae
  - Tribe Pavonini
    - Crested argus (genus Rheinardia)
      - Vietnamese crested argus (R. ocellata)
      - Malayan crested argus (R. nigrescens)
    - Great argus (genus Argusianus)
      - Great argus (A. argus)
  - Tribe Polyprectronini
    - Peacock-pheasants (genus Polyplectron)
      - Bronze-tailed peacock-pheasant (P. chalcurum)
      - Mountain peacock-pheasant (P. inopinatum)
      - Germain's peacock-pheasant (P. germaini)
      - Grey peacock-pheasant (P. bicalcaratum
      - Hainan peacock-pheasant (Polyplectron katsumatae)
      - Malayan peacock-pheasant (P. malacense)
      - Bornean peacock-pheasant (P. schleiermacheri)
      - Palawan peacock-pheasant (P. emphanum)

=== Previous classifications ===
Euplocamus and Gennceus are older names more or less corresponding to the current Lophura.

- Euplocamus was used, for example, by Hume and Marshall in their Game Birds of India, Burmah and Ceylon (1879–1881).
- Gennceus, was used, for example, by Frank Finn in Indian Sporting Birds (1915) and Game Birds of India and Asia (1911).

These old genera were used for:

Vernacular	Hume & Marshall	Finn: Sporting Birds	Finn: Game Birds	Contemporary
Vieillot's crested fireback	E. vielloti	Lophura rufa (sic)		L. ignita rufa
Black-backed kalij	E. melanonotus	G. melanonotus		L. leucomelanos melanota
Common or white-crested kalij	E. albocristatus	G. albocristatus		L. leucomelanos hamiltoni
Nepal kalij	E. leucomelanus	G. leucomelanus		L. leucomelanos leucomelanos
Purple, Horsfield's or black-breasted kalij	E. horsfieldi	G. horsfieldi		L. leucomelanos lathami
Lineated kalij	E. lineatus	G. lineatus also: Burmese silver pheasant		L. leucomelanos lineata
Anderson's silver pheasant		G. andersoni, considered hybrid of L. nycthemera and L. l. lineata		L. nycthemera andersoni (invalid)
Crawfurd's silver pheasant (or Crawford's?)	E. andersoni	considered a further cross of Anderson's and L. l. lineata		
Crawfurd's kalij (same as C.'s silver pheasant?)			G. andersoni	L. leucomelanos crawfurdi
Cuvier's kalij			G. cuvieri	?
Oates's kalij			G. oatesi	L. leucomelanos oatesi
Whitehead's silver pheasant			G. whiteheadi	?
Swinhoe's kalij			G. swinhoii	L. swinhoii

== Bibliography ==
- Beebe, William. 1918-22. A Monograph of the Pheasants. 1st edition in 4 volumes: H. F. Witherby, London. Reprint: 1990, Dover Publications.(4 volumes bound as 2). ISBN 0-486-26579-X and ISBN 0-486-26580-3. Republished as: Pheasants: Their Lives and Homes. 2 vols. 1926. Single volume edition: New York Zoological Society, 1936.)
- Green-Armytage, Stephen. 2002. Extraordinary Pheasants.Harry N. Abrams, Inc., New York. Book ISBN 0-8109-1007-1.
- Madge and McGowan, Pheasants, Partridges and Grouse ISBN 0-7136-3966-0
