= Fireback =

Fireback may refer to:

- Fireback (film)
- Fireplace fireback
- Pheasants
  - Crested fireback
  - Crestless fireback
  - Siamese fireback
