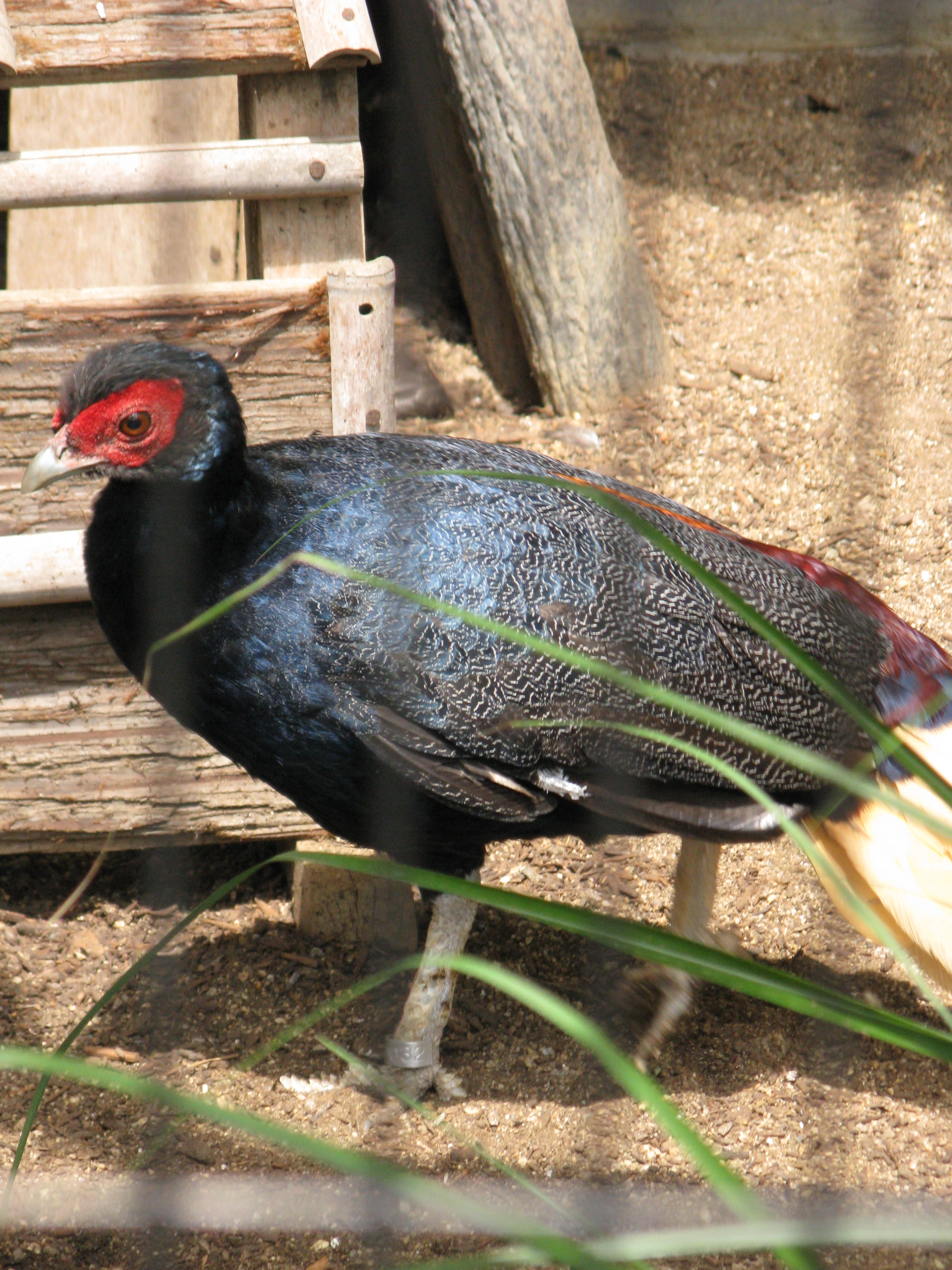
- Malayan crestless fireback

Scientific classification
- Domain: Eukaryota
- Kingdom: Animalia
- Phylum: Chordata
- Class: Aves
- Order: Galliformes
- Family: Phasianidae
- Tribe: Phasianini
- Genus: Lophura

= Crestless fireback =

Species of bird

The crestless firebacks (Lophura sp) are a group of two species of bird in the family Phasianidae. They are found in Brunei, Indonesia, Malaysia, and Singapore. Their natural habitat is subtropical or tropical moist lowland forests. They are threatened by habitat destruction.

== Description ==
Male crestless firebacks are about 38 cm (15 in) in length and females slightly smaller. The face has bare red skin, the bill is greenish in males and black in females, there is no crest, the legs are bluish-grey, with long spurs in males and short spurs in females. The tail is short and either rounded, or the central feathers are shorter than the outer ones. The male has purplish-black plumage, with white vermiculation on the mantle and back, the wings and the side of the breast. The rump is bright chestnut and the upper tail coverts are purple with maroon margins. The tail feathers are cinnamon with black bases. The female crestless fireback is almost completely black with a blue or green gloss and was for some time considered to be a separate species. The head is brownish, paling to nearly white on the throat. Juveniles resemble females but have pale-edged feathers, and young males develop chestnut rumps quite soon. The female is very similar in appearance to the male Salvadori's pheasant (Lophura inornata) which is endemic to Sumatra, but that species tends to inhabit forests at higher altitudes.

== Distribution and habitat ==
The Malayan crestless fireback is found in mainland Malaysia and Sumatra while pyronota occurs in Borneo. The male of the latter species is a greyer bird, with black and white vermiculations, and steel blue upper tail coverts. The crestless firebacks are shy birds and seldom seen; they inhabit undergrowth in lowland rainforests, and also secondary growth forest in Malaysia, up to altitudes of about 300 m (1,000 ft).

== Ecology ==
The crestless firebacks are retiring bird and has been little studied. They mostly occur in pairs or small groups. It lives on the ground among undergrowth and feeds during the day by scratching up the leaf litter and eating the small animals exposed, as well as feeding on vegetable matter and fallen fruit. They breed in captivity, and a nest recorded in the wild was between the buttress roots of a large tree and contained a clutch of four or five pink or pale buff eggs. The breeding season is from April to June and the gestation period lasts 24 days.

== Status ==
The birds are uncommon, with a moderate-sized range and a patchy distribution. Their natural habitat is lowland evergreen virgin forest, including peat forest and karst forest. These habitats are increasingly being cleared and the population of the bird is thought to be decreasing. However, they have also been observed in partially logged secondary forest in both Malaysia and Sumatra, and have been recorded there at densities of six birds per square kilometre. Besides this, some birds live in protected areas of forest. The International Union for Conservation of Nature estimates there may be a total of between ten and twenty thousand mature individuals. Clements and the IUCN has split into both species and the IOC has followed suit.

== Species ==
- Malayan crestless fireback, Lophura erythrophthalma
- Bornean crestless fireback, Lophura pyronota
