= Jean Théodore Delacour =

French ornithologist and aviculturist

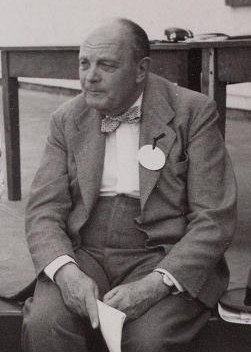
- Delacour in 1957, photographed by Alexander Wetmore
- Born: 26 September 1890; Paris, France
- Died: 5 November 1985 (aged 95); Los Angeles, California, U.S.

Jean Théodore Delacour (26 September 1890 – 5 November 1985) was a French ornithologist and aviculturist. He later became an American citizen. He was renowned for not only discovering but also rearing some of the rarest birds in the world. He established very successful aviaries twice in his life, stocked with birds from around the world, including those that he obtained on expeditions to Southeast Asia, Africa and South America. His first aviary in Villers-Bretonneux was destroyed in World War One. The second one that he established at Clères was destroyed in World War Two. He moved to the United States of America where he worked on avian systematics and was one of the founders of the International Committee for Bird Protection (later BirdLife International). One of the birds he discovered was the imperial pheasant, later identified as a hybrid between the Vietnamese pheasant and the silver pheasant.

== Life and work ==
Delacour was born in Paris into an aristocratic family and grew up on the family estate at Villiers near Amiens where he was fascinated by the orchids and ornamental birds in the castle park. With the money he received from his family (his father died in 1905), he established a private zoo in Picardy. He attended schools in Paris where he spent time in the natural history museum and received a doctorate in biology from the Université Lille Nord de France. He maintained 1,345 birds of 344 species in 1916.

Delacour served in the French Army during World War I, a war which devastated the family estate, as well as killing his only surviving brother. He was so shocked by the inhumanity that he swore not to have a family and moved to England for its peace. He however decided to return to France and bought the Chateau de Clères in Normandy where he set about making a menagerie. It was so well known that the 9th International Ornithological Congress was held in 1938 in the nearby town of Rouen. One of the visitors to his aviary was Pierre Jabouille, the French administrator for Annam, a part of Indochina. On the latter's invitation, Delacour went on numerous scientific expeditions to Indochina, particularly Vietnam, as well as to Venezuela, the Guianas and Madagascar.

Perhaps my bitter experience may serve as an object lesson to those who hold material possessions in too great esteem and to remind others that nothing in life should be regarded as permanent.

— Delacour, Avicultural Magazine 1941

During World War II Chateau Clères was bombed by the German Luftwaffe on 7 June 1940. Most of his library, animals in his collection and the castle were destroyed, but his manager Frank E. Fooks escaped. Delacour was saved by Belgians and Frenchmen and escaped to Vichy. Erwin Stresemann, a good friend and admirer of Delacour heard of the fate of the zoo and attempted to ensure the safety of the remaining animals through the Wehrmacht. Delacour meanwhile fled through Casablanca, Rabat, Tangier and Lisbon, reaching New York City on Christmas Day 1940. His American friends found him a job, his first, at the Bronx Zoo and the Museum of Natural History at New York. Delacour lived in the United States, working as a technical adviser for the New York Zoological Society (now known as the Wildlife Conservation Society) as well as on avian systematics at the American Museum of Natural History examining many enigmatic genera such as Hypocolius and Picathartes. In 1952, he became director of the Los Angeles County Museum of History, Science and Art, retiring in 1960. After the war ended he divided his time seasonally, spending every summer from 1946 at his estate at Clères where he organized the rebuilding of his zoo through his assistant F. E. Fook and with assistance from Sir Peter Scott, Alfred Ezra and the Duke of Bedford. It was opened in May 1947 with the French Prime Minister taking part in the inauguration. The collection was eventually donated to the Museum National d'Histoire Naturelle in 1967. He was a co-founder of the International Council for Bird Preservation, serving as its president from 1938 to 1958. Delacour spent his winters in the United States, mainly in Los Angeles where he served from 1952 to 1960 as the director of the County Museum of History, Science and Art. Spending all his time and resources on his bird collections, he never married. He had trained as an operatic singer and was particularly fond of Moussorgsky's compositions.

Delacour was reliant on a wheelchair in later life. He lived with his mother who died in 1954 at the age of 94. In his autobiography "The Living Air" he wrote that humans would eventually annihilate all life on earth.

== Taxon named in his honor ==
Delacour is commemorated in the scientific name of a species of Southeast Asian snake, Plagiopholis delacouri.

Oreoglanis delacouri is a species of catfish in the family Sisoridae found in Laos and China

== Bibliography ==
Apart from many papers in the ornithological literature, particularly in the Avicultural Magazine, Delacour wrote or cowrote several books including:

- 1931 – Les Oiseaux de L'Indochine Française (4 vols)
- 1945 – Birds of the Philippines (with Ernst Mayr)
- 1947 – Birds of Malaysia
- 1951 – The Pheasants of the World
- 1951–64 – The Waterfowl of the World (4 vols) - with paintings by Sir Peter Scott
- 1959 – Wild Pigeons and Doves
- 1966 – The Living Air: The Memoirs of an Ornithologist (autobiography)
- 1973 – Curassows and Related Birds (with Dean Amadon)
