= Crested fireback =

Crested fireback is a name for two species of pheasant in the genus Lophura.

- Bornean crested fireback (Lophura ignita)
- Malayan crested fireback (Lophura rufa)

Crested firebacks typically have light-blue heads and dark bodies, with a red patch of feathers.
