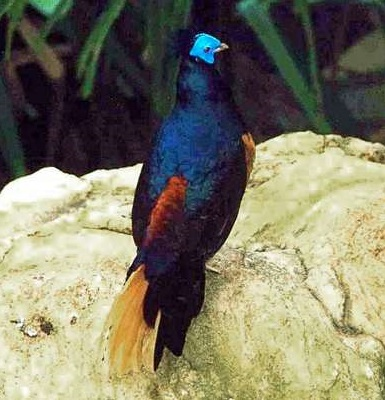
- Male
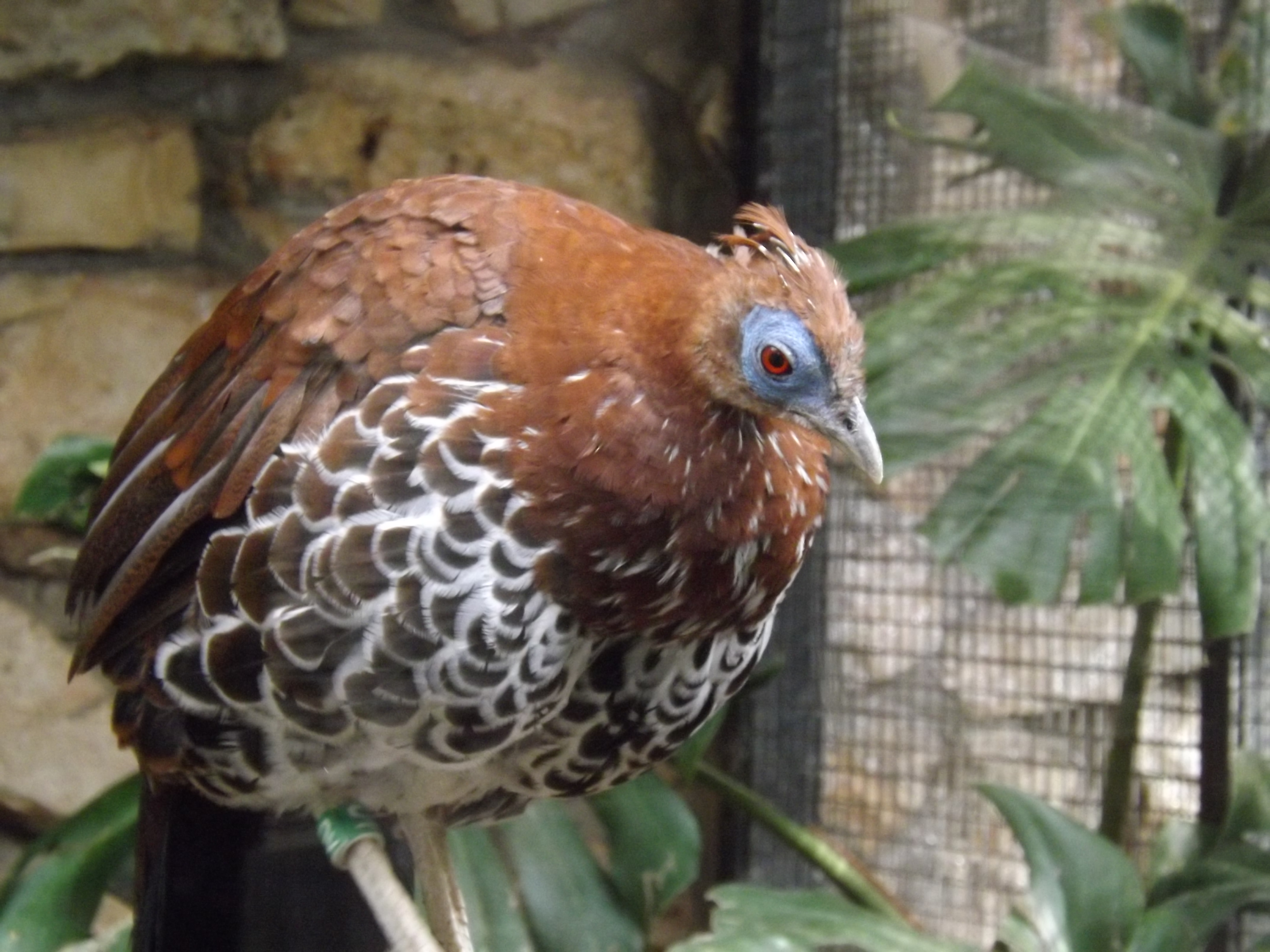
- Female at the Jerusalem Biblical Zoo

Conservation status
- Vulnerable (IUCN 3.1)

Scientific classification
- Kingdom: Animalia
- Phylum: Chordata
- Class: Aves
- Order: Galliformes
- Family: Phasianidae
- Genus: Lophura
- Species: L. ignita

Binomial name
- Lophura ignita (Shaw, 1798)

Synonyms
- Phasianus ignitus Shaw, 1797

= Bornean crested fireback =

Species of bird

The Bornean crested fireback, Lophura ignita, is a large, sexually dimorphic, and distinctly-coloured pheasant of the family Galliformes endemic to the rainforests of Borneo and the surrounding islands. It is a non-migrating omnivorous species, often seen in groups of 5–6 in the rainforest lowlands. As of 2020 they were classified as Vulnerable by the IUCN due to population decline from habitat loss and deforestation, hunting, and trapping for the cage bird trade.

== Description ==
The Bornean crested fireback maintains a similar body plan to most other species in Galliformes (heavy bodied ground-dwellers). Similar to other species in the genus Lophura, L. ignita has strong coloration, with a dark plumage contrasting vibrant accents.

=== Juvenile ===
Before sex-specific coloration appears, juvenile females may be distinguished from males by their overall lighter plumage. The juveniles' plumage is like that of adult females, although they lack the crest seen on adults and have large black spots on the upper wing coverts. The adult female of related species, L. bulweri, often look like juvenile L. ignitia, but they can be distinguished by the black covert spots seen in L. ignitia. As well, L. ignitia has dark chestnut plumage, light underside markings, and pale legs. Juveniles are often seen with adults during post-natal care periods.

==== Immature male ====
The average body length is 43 cm, the average tail length is 16 cm, and the average spur length is 3mm. Spurs are often bulbous on the base as they are still developing. Immature males' plumage resembles a dull version of the adult's at around 4–6 months of age, but they still lack the distinct crest and have smaller wattles. They have chestnut vermiculation on the mantle. Bill colour varies but is usually pale. They can be distinguished from adult males by the overall smaller dimensions, particularly smaller tail and spurs, as well as the lack of crest and reduced wattles. However, distinguishing may not always be easy.

=== Adult ===
==== Male ====
Average body length is 61 cm and average tail length is 24 cm. Males have pronounced spurs around 30mm in length, often longer. The dark blue head bears a crest of upright feathers that lack barbules. Crest feathers average 38mm in length. Males have distinct and extensive bright blue facial wattles. The upper chest and throat are dark blue, and the undersides are chestnut brown. The upper tail coverts are dark blue while the under-tail coverts are near black, as is the vent. Wing coverts have iridescent blue edges. The male's primaries are dull black to brown. The lower back is dark maroon, and the rump and top of tail are dark blue, similar to the chest. The tail elongates towards the central pair of rectrices; the two or three central pairs are ochre, while the outer five pairs are dark blue or black. Legs and feet are often off-white, sometimes gray or pale green. The bill is pale and irises red.

==== Female ====
The average body length is 51 cm and the average tail length is 18 cm. Spurs are either absent or reduced and average 2mm. The chestnut-colour head bears a dark crest of upright feathers lacking barbules of average length 33mm. Females, too, have facial wattles, but they are darker blue as opposed to the male's vibrant blue. The throat is whitish, and the female's upper chest is dark chestnut with white streaks. The lower chest and underside are the same colour except with white borders along the feathers, leading to a scaled appearance. The upperside is dark chestnut, and the tail is nearly black and straight, often with lighter brown patterns on the edges of rectrices. Coverts on the bottom of the tail are dark brown, and the vent is off-white. Coverts on tail-top and wing-coverts have dark vermiculation. The legs are pale brown and the bill colour varies. Female Bornean crested firebacks have bright red irises.

==== Differentiation by sex ====
The male's crest is a glossy dark blue, while the female's is copper or chestnut. Females' chests are chestnut with white edges appearing gradually towards the underside, while males have a bright copper chest. Males have much longer spurs than females and their tail is arching and blue/ochre, while the female's is straight and darker than her body. As well, males have a longer tail, on average 40% of their body length, while female's tails are usually 36% of their body length. The females smaller stature and cryptic colour allows them to raise chicks more inconspicuously.

== Taxonomy ==
The Bornean crested fireback, Lophura ignita, is part of the genus Lophura, commonly called gallopheasants, which contains 11 species including L. ignita. It is part of the family Phasianidae which includes turkeys, grouse, partridge, Old World quail, francolins, and pheasants. There are over 50 genera in this family, which is part of the order Galliformes, an extensive group of heavy-bodied birds. There are around 290 species in Galliformes.

The Bornean crested fireback was previously placed in genus Euplocomus, but the genetic ties between Lophura species are close enough for them to be placed in a single genus. Previously, L. ignita was grouped with the Malayan Crested Fireback L. rufa, its sister species, under the united name 'Crested Fireback. Both were called Lophura ignita. The two can be distinguished visually, with the Malayan counterpart having a dark blue underside with white stripes and the Bornean species being chestnut-chested and without stripes. And, the females of the Malayan and Bornean species have chestnut vs blackish tails, respectively.

There are two generally recognized subspecies of Lophura ignita, although more studies are needed. Lophura ignita ignita, or the lesser Bornean crested fireback, occurs in southern Borneo and Bangka Island, southeast of Sumatra. It is distinguished from the second subspecies, Lophura ignita nobilis, the greater Bornean crested fireback, by its slightly smaller size. L. i. nobilis can be found in northern Borneo. The range boundary between the two subspecies is unclear.

A now negated subspecies, Lophura ignita macartneyi was long considered a third subspecies. This taxon is found in southeastern Sumatra with variable features similar to that of Lophura ignita. However, reviews of specimen material have revealed that the supposed subspecies is instead likely a hybrid between the Bornean crested fireback and Malayan crested fireback, Lophura rufa. The hybrids does not present discrete phenotypes, indicating they are not a distinct species. How the Bornean and Malayan species came together in Sumatra is unclear but may have been through human movement of L. ignita or through use of land bridges during low sea level ages.

=== Speciation ===
Genus Lophura had rapid speciation events early in its history, and most genetic divergence between species is due to substitutions within the clade. Speciation within the genus could have occurred allopatrically or through ecological partitioning between lowlands and highlands. Mitochondrial DNA studies support the claim that Lophura is a monophyletic clade, with genuses Crossoptilon and Phasianus the closest related sister taxa.

Related species L. diardi separated from L. ignita through geographic isolation. They have a 4.4% sequence divergence, and so likely split around 2.2 million years ago. Allopatric speciation of this genus likely occurred across South East Asia. Nearby areas, including the isolated rainforests on Indonesian islands, were then colonized independently through the use of land-bridges.

== Distribution and habitat ==
=== Distribution ===
The species is endemic to Borneo and present throughout much of the lowlands, including regions of Malaysia (Sabah and Sarawak), Brunei, and Indonesia (Kalimantan), and Bangka Island in southeastern Sumatra. It is a non-migrating species and maintains a consistent distribution year-round.

=== Habitat ===
Ideal habitat for this species is lowland forest and rainforest undergrowth, although they have been spotted in logged forest in Sabah and western Sarawak as well, indicating they have some tolerance for forest degradation. They are usually found at relatively high elevations, from 600m elevation recorded in Sabah to 1300m in Borneo, although their exact range is contested and unclear. They are distributed higher than related species Lophura pyronata, the Bornean crestless fireback.

Larger forests patches that are interconnected with other areas of the forest can support larger groups of L. ignita and a greater diversity of Galliformes species. Forest patches less than 4400 ha are almost always deprived of Galliformes, indicating these species require larger area for survival. Unfortunately, significant portions of their range are subject to human encroachment and illegal logging.

== Behaviour ==
The species tends to be wary and live in mixed-sex groups of 5–6 individuals. They can become habituated to humans if exposed for prolonged periods.

=== Vocalizations ===
Bornean crested firebacks have extensive vocalizations. Cornell Lab identified the following divisions:

Squeal: "Loud squeals or piping whistles" with variable, but usually shrill, notes. These calls are exclusive to males during intrasexual conflict or other aggressive activity and usually lasts for 0.6–1.0 seconds.

Squirrel call: A snapping note similar to that of the squirrel. It consists of a low-pitched sound followed by a downslurred call, like "guh-CHIK!". The call is repeated at a rate of 2–4 calls/second, with a call duration of 0.1 seconds. The downslurred note drops in frequency from 7 kHz to 1 kHz. This call likely acts as an alarm signal.

Mellow notes: These calls vary and often only heard at close range. They are all below 600 Hz.

Grunts: These often occur in tandem with mellow notes, and are characterized as "short faint growls, grunts, barks, or clucks". Along with mellow notes, this call is used to maintain contact over short distances.

Cackle: Males may release soft and rhythmic cackles during their wing-whirring courtshit ritual.

The impact of environment or life stage on vocalizations is understudied, but most vocalizations can likely be heard year round. Cackles and other calls associated with courtship may be more common during breeding season. Calls are more likely in early morning and late afternoon. Both sexes utter all vocal calls, except for cackles and squeals which are male-specific.

=== Diet ===
Bornean crested firebacks are omnivorous ground foragers. Their diet is mainly supplied by plant matter including seeds and fruit and supplemented by insects or other invertebrates and, when opportune, small mammals (ex. mice).

Analysis of their habitat recorded 13 families of vegetation, from which 23 species may contribute to their diet. The families are Annonaceae, Clusiaceae, Dipterocarpaceae, Ebenaceae, Euphorbiaceae, Fabaceae, Lauraceae, Lecythidaceae, Moraceae, Myristicaceae, Myrtaceae, Sapindaceae, and Theaceae.

=== Reproduction ===
Bornean crested fireback males perform wing-whirring courtship rituals. These signal the males presence to females and announces the male's territory. Males whir their wings at 12 beats per 1.2 seconds, producing a low-pitched rumble that can penetrate the undergrowth. The male may also cackle or squeal. They are territorial and noted to use the spurs on their feet to compete with other males.

The reproductive behaviour of this species in the wild is understudied. It appears that their breeding period may not be controlled by season or is elongated compared to average. Egg-layings have been reported in Sabah in July and August while reports from West Kalimantan are in February and March. Moult patterns and visual observations tentatively suggest a breeding season from February to August.

Nests have been found between the roots of trees, but are usually shallow crevices lined with feathers, dead leaves, grass, or bamboo. Eggs are gray or cream (sometimes with brown spots), oval, and approximately 51.3 x 37.4mm in dimension. Very few nests have been found in the wild, but clutch size is estimated to be around 6.

The incubation period of the Bornean crested fireback is unknown, but captive L. rufa incubated for 24 days. Chicks are precocial upon hatching. They have dark brown down on their upperside and are white or reddish below, with a reddish crown. Chicks are cared for only by the female, as is common in pheasants.

== Conservation ==
As of 2020, the IUCN designated the Bornean crested rireback as Vulnerable. The population has continued to decrease due to habitat loss, hunting, and trapping. Lowland specialists, like L. ignita, are particularly threatened by habitat loss due to logging and deforestation. Deforestation in the area has not slowed for decades and encroaches on the birds' range. According to the IUCN, it is suspected the species is "undergoing a rapid population reduction".

These forest pheasants are also at risk of hunting and trapping for the cage bird trade. Their populations can rapidly reduce if accessible to trappers, and unfortunately they are accessible across most of their range.
