= Kẻ Gỗ Nature Reserve =

Nature reserve in Vietnam

Coordinates: 18°05′N 106°00′E

Kẻ Gỗ Nature Reserve is a nature reserve in Vietnam. It is located in three districts of this province, namely: Cẩm Xuyên, Thạch Hà, Hương Khê. It was established by the Decision No. 519/QD-UB dated May 3, 1997 of the Ha Tinh People's Committee. The purpose of this establishment is to protect the endangered Vietnamese pheasant (Lophura hatinhensis) and the imperial pheasant (Lophura imperialis) as well as biodiversity in the southern area of this province. In this area, there exists nearly 100 species of amphibians and reptiles as shown by the German biologist Dr. Thomas Ziegler. Large mammals are rare, due to the high hunting pressure. So there is probably no more elephants. Ke Go is home to one of the last lowland rainforests of Vietnam. The management board includes about 70 persons, inclusive of 56 rangers. Illegal loggings, poaching and exploitation of oil threaten this habitat. The Netherlands and ORO-VERDE financially supported a project for the conservation of the reserve.

In 2017, four Hatinh langurs were released into the reserve as part of a reintroduction program by the Endangered Primate Rescue Center.
