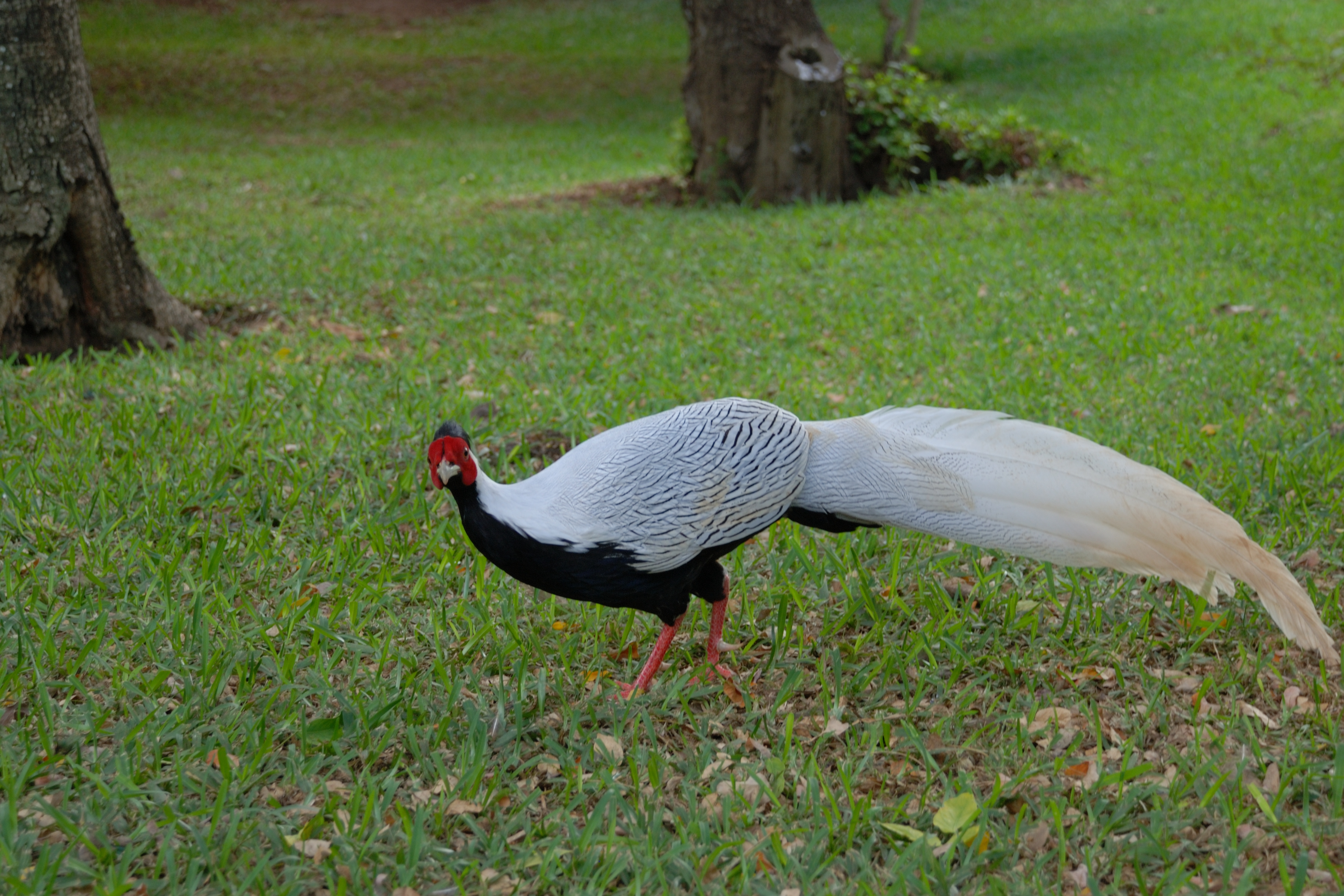
- Male
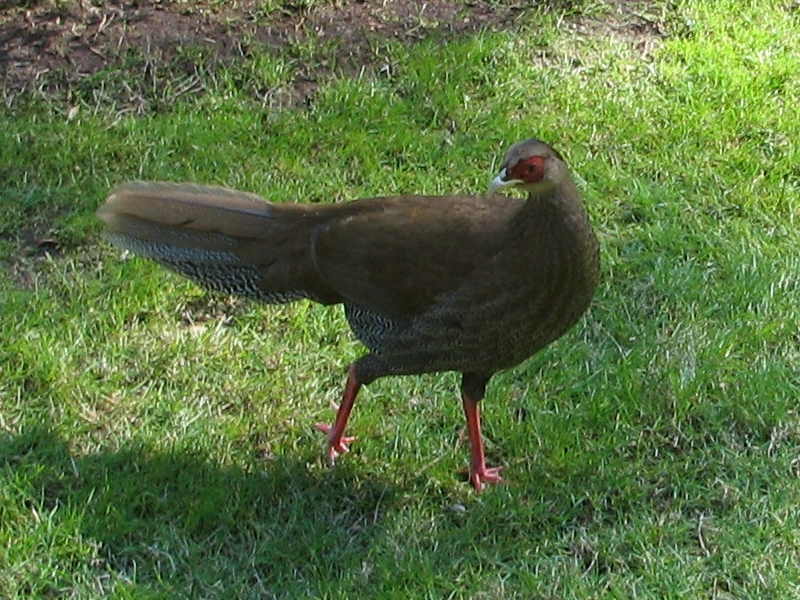
- Female

Conservation status
- Least Concern (IUCN 3.1)

Scientific classification
- Kingdom: Animalia
- Phylum: Chordata
- Class: Aves
- Order: Galliformes
- Family: Phasianidae
- Genus: Lophura
- Species: L. nycthemera

Binomial name
- Lophura nycthemera (Linnaeus, 1758)

Synonyms
- Phasianus nycthemerus Linnaeus, 1758

= Silver pheasant =

Species of bird

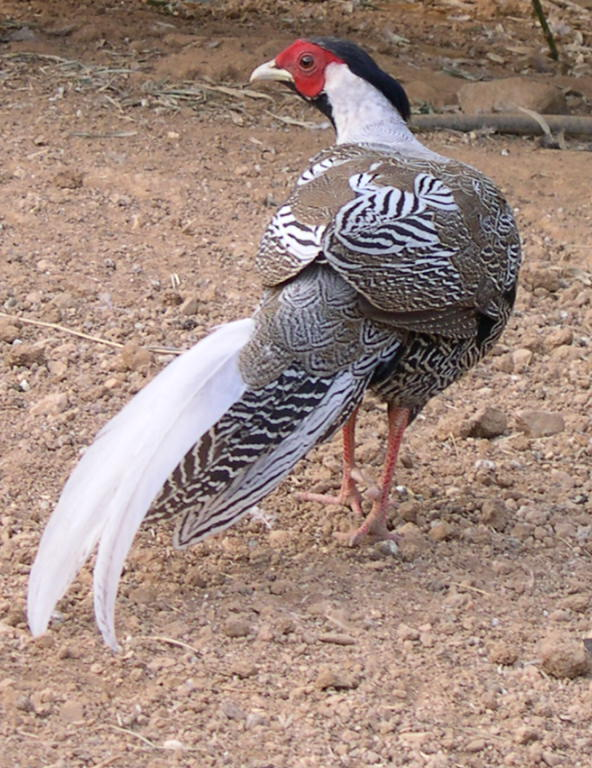
Silver pheasant cock in captivity. Note the brown patches, typical of sub-adult males

The silver pheasant (Lophura nycthemera) is a species of pheasant found in forests, mainly in mountains, of mainland Southeast Asia and eastern and southern China. It is introduced on Victoria Island in Nahuel Huapi Lake, Neuquén, Argentina and on Vancouver Island, Canada. The male is black and white, while the female is mainly brown. Both sexes have a bare red face and red legs (the latter separating it from the greyish-legged kalij pheasant). It is common in aviculture, and overall also remains common in the wild, but some of its subspecies (notably L. n. whiteheadi from Hainan, L. n. engelbachi from southern Laos, and L. n. annamensis from southern Vietnam) are rare and threatened.

== Taxonomy ==
The silver pheasant was formally described in 1758 by the Swedish naturalist Carl Linnaeus in the tenth edition of his Systema Naturae. He placed it with the other pheasants in the genus Phasianus and coined the binomial name Phasianus nycthemerus. He specified the type locality as China. The specific epithet nycthemerus combines the Ancient Greek νυξ/nux, νυκτος/nuktos meaning "night" with ἡμερα/hēmera meaning "day". The silver pheasant was formerly sometimes placed in the genus Gennaeus but is now one of 11 species placed in the genus Lophura that was introduced in 1822 by the Scottish naturalist John Fleming.

The silver pheasant is closely related to the kalij pheasant and the two are known to hybridize. The placement of the taxa L. n. lineata and L. n. crawfurdi has been a matter of dispute, with some treating them as subspecies of the kalij pheasant and others as subspecies of the silver pheasant. They have greyish legs as in the kalij pheasant, but their plumage is closer to that of some subspecies of the silver pheasant. Additionally, as the silver pheasant, L. n. lineata and L. n. crawfurdi are found east of the Irrawaddy River, a major zoogeographic barrier, while all other subspecies of the kalij pheasant are found west of the river (L. n. oatesi, a subspecies of the kalij pheasant, has sometimes been reported as occurring east of that river, but this is incorrect). Based on mtDNA, it was recently confirmed that L. n. lineata and L. n. crawfurdi should be regarded as subspecies of the kalij pheasant.

With these two as subspecies of the kalij pheasant, the silver pheasant has 15 subspecies. However, while some subspecies are relatively distinctive, several others (at least L. n. rufipes, L. n. occidentalis, L. n. ripponi, L. n. jonesi, L. n. beaulieui, L. n. nycthemera, and L. n. fokiensis) are likely part of a cline, which if confirmed, would result in them being junior synonyms of the nominate subspecies. Several other taxa, for example L. n. andersoni, are now considered invalid by all major authorities.

Once considered a very rare species, the imperial pheasant is actually a naturally occurring hybrid between the silver pheasant and Edward's pheasant.

=== Subspecies ===
Fifteen subspecies are recognised:

- L. n. omeiensis Cheng T & Chang C & Tang R, 1964 – central, south Sichuan (central south China)
- L. n. rongjiangensis Tan Y & Wu Z, 1981 – southeast Guizhou (central south China)
- L. n. nycthemera (Linnaeus, 1758) – Guangxi, Guangdong (south China) and northeast Vietnam
- L. n. fokiensis Delacour, 1948 – northwest Fokien (southeast China)
- L. n. whiteheadi (Ogilvie-Grant, 1899) – Hainan Island (south China)
- L. n. occidentalis Delacour, 1948 – northwest Yunnan (southwest China) and northeast Myanmar
- L. n. rufipes (Oates, 1898) – southwest Yunnan (southwest China) and central north Myanmar
- L. n. jonesi (Oates, 1903) – east Myanmar to south China and north Thailand
- L. n. ripponi (Sharpe, 1902) – central east Myanmar
- L. n. beaulieui Delacour, 1948 – southwest Yunnan (central south China), north Laos and northwest Vietnam
- L. n. berliozi (Delacour & Jabouille, 1928) – central north Vietnam
- L. n. beli (Oustalet, 1898) – central west Vietnam
- L. n. annamensis (Ogilvie-Grant, 1906) – central south Vietnam
- L. n. lewisi (Delacour & Jabouille, 1928) – southwest Cambodia and southeast Thailand
- L. n. engelbachi Delacour, 1948 – south Laos

== Description ==
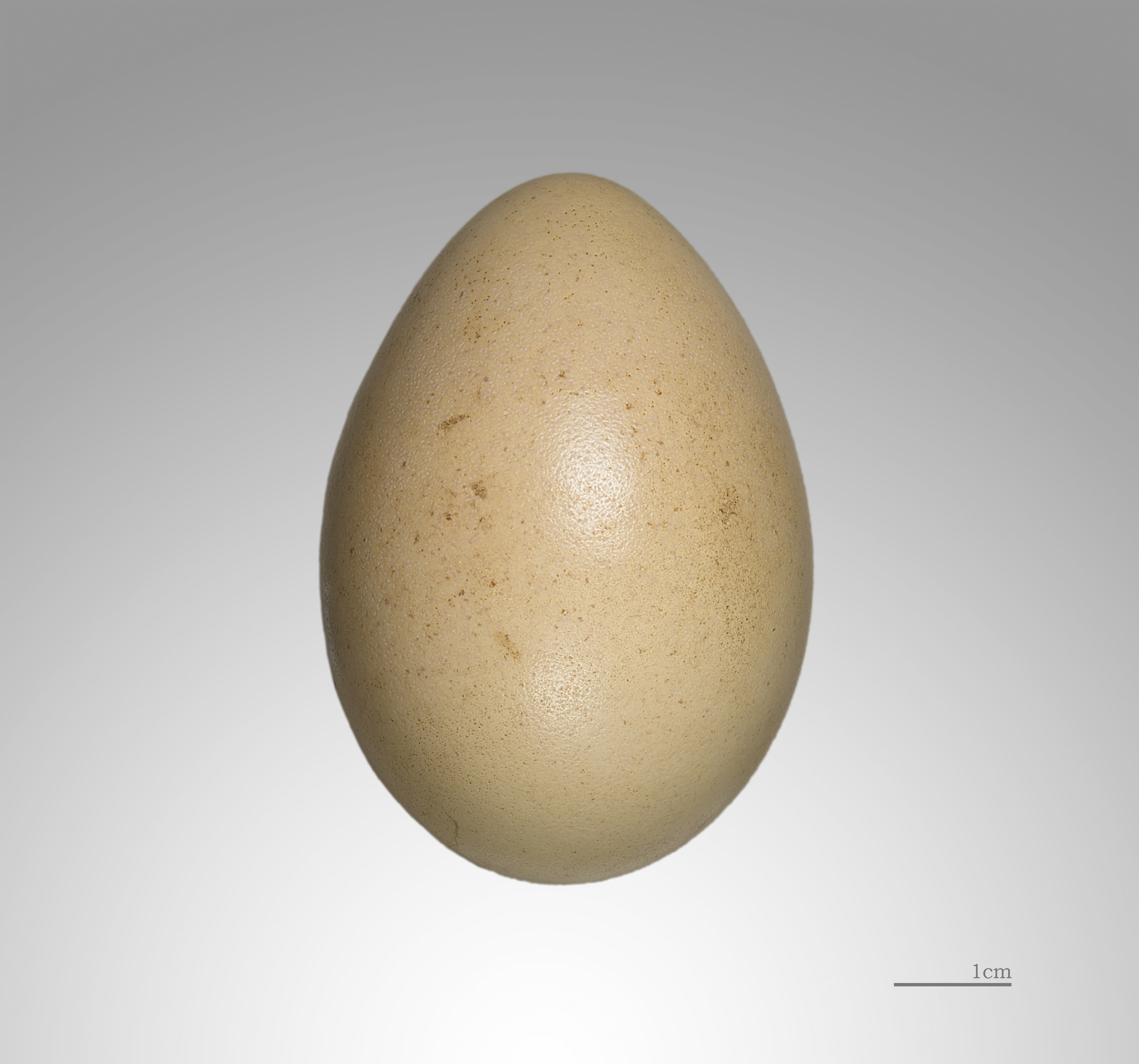
Lophura nycthemera - MHNT

This is a relatively large pheasant, with males of the largest subspecies having a total length of 120 to 125 cm (47 to 49 in), including a tail up to 75 cm (30 in), while the males of the smallest subspecies barely reach 70 cm (28 in) in total length, including a tail around 30 cm (12 in). The body mass of males can range from 1.13–2.00 kg (2.49–4.41 lb). Females of all subspecies are notably smaller than their respective males, with a size range of 55–90 cm (22–35 in) in total length, including a tail of 24–32 cm (9.4–12.6 in). The body mass of females can range from 1.0–1.3 kg (2.2–2.9 lb).

Males of the northern subspecies, which are the largest, have white upperparts and tail (most feathers with some black markings), while their underparts and crest are glossy bluish-black. The males of the southern subspecies have greyer upperparts and tail with extensive black markings, making them appear far darker than the northern subspecies. The adult male plumage is reached in the second year.

Females are brown and shorter-tailed than males. Females of some subspecies have whitish underparts strongly patterned with black, and in L. n. whiteheadi this extends to the upper mantle.
