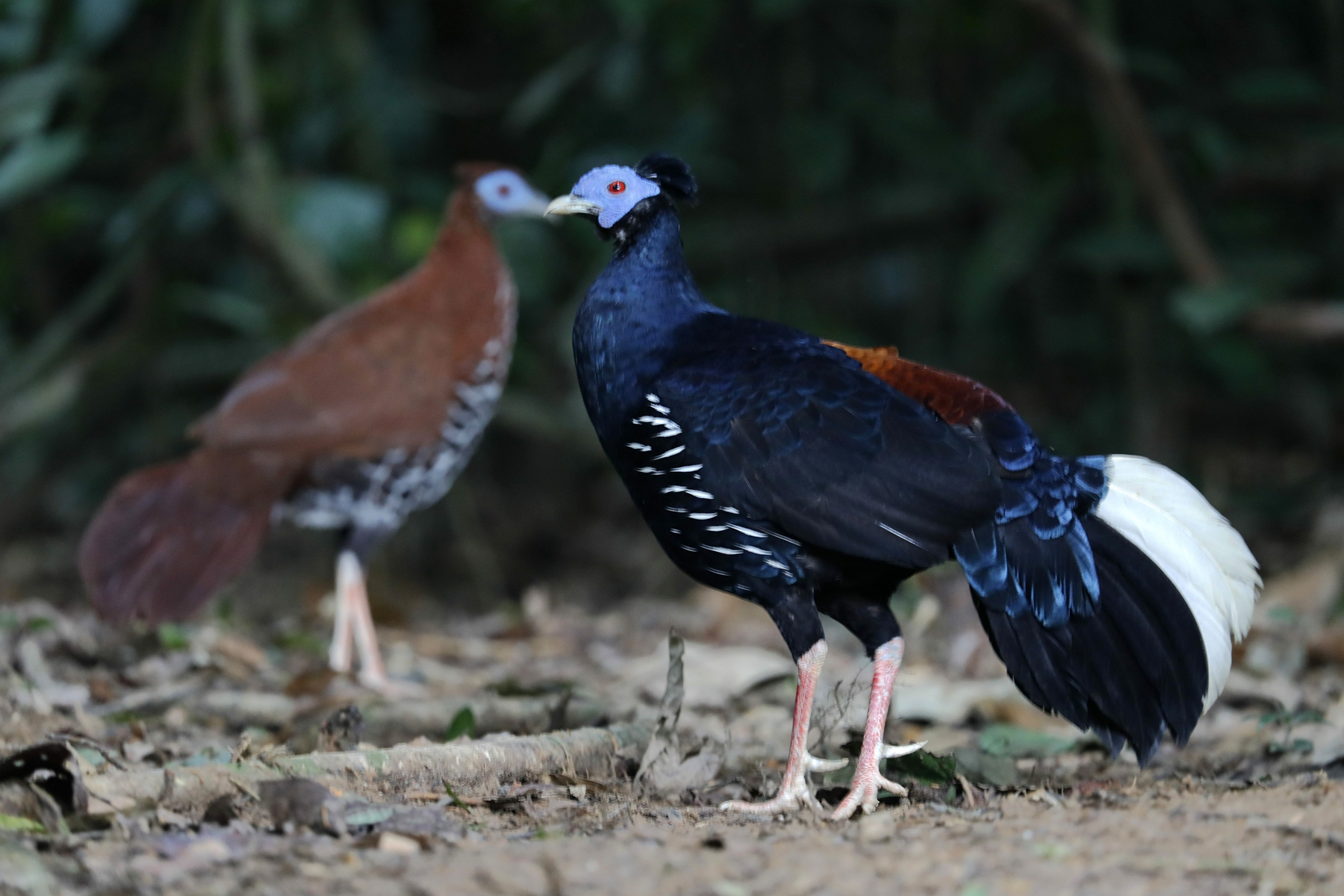
- Pair in Taman Negara National Park

Conservation status
- Vulnerable (IUCN 3.1)

Scientific classification
- Kingdom: Animalia
- Phylum: Chordata
- Class: Aves
- Order: Galliformes
- Family: Phasianidae
- Genus: Lophura
- Species: L. rufa

Binomial name
- Lophura rufa (Raffles, 1822)

Synonyms
- Lophura ignita rufa (Raffles, 1822); Lophura ignita maccartneyi (Temminck, 1813)

= Malayan crested fireback =

Species of bird

The Malayan crested fireback or Malay crested fireback (Lophura rufa) is a species of forest pheasant found in lowland forests of the Thai-Malay Peninsula and Sumatra.

== Taxonomy ==
This species was formerly considered a subspecies of the Bornean crested fireback (L. ignita), with both being grouped together as the crested fireback. Substantial plumage differences between both taxa led to the IUCN and Clements Checklist splitting both, with the International Ornithological Congress also making this change in 2023.

A pheasant of uncertain taxonomic provenance, popularly referred to as "Delacour's crested fireback" (formerly Lophura ignita macartneyi) is found in south-eastern Sumatra and the male has white to the tail, whitish legs and a variable amount of rufous below. As macartneyi specimens are variable, the Handbook of Birds of the World regards it as a hybrid between L. rufa and a possible relictual or introduced population of L. ignita. In 2023, the International Ornithological Congress officially recognized it as representing a hybrid swarm between L. ignita and L. rufa, and classified it within L. rufa.

== Description ==
It is a medium-sized, up to 70 cm long pheasant with a peacock-like dark crest, bluish black plumage, reddish brown rump, black outer tail feathers, red iris and bare blue facial skin. The female is a brown bird with short crest, blue facial skin and spotted black-and-white below. It is distinguished from the Bornean crested fireback by its white central tail feathers, red legs and bluish black streaked white below.

== Status ==
Due to ongoing habitat loss and overhunting in some areas, the Malayan crested fireback is evaluated as Vulnerable on the IUCN Red List of Threatened Species.
