= Võ Quý =

Vietnamese zoologist and professor

- Born: December 31, 1929
- Died: January 10, 2017 (aged 87)
- Occupations: Zoologist, Professor, Ornithologist
- Known for: Work on defoliation/reforestation and bird migration after the Vietnam War
- Awards: 2003 Blue Planet Prize

Võ Quý (December 31, 1929 – January 10, 2017) was a Vietnamese zoologist and professor at the Vietnam National University, Hanoi. He was an ornithologist and a recipient of the 2003 Blue Planet Prize.

During the war against the French, he studied in China, but in 1954, he returned to Vietnam and helped to found the University of Hanoi.

He researched the effects of defoliation by the United States in the Vietnam War, and the impact of the herbicides, including Agent Orange used on the environment. He helped to plan government reforestation programmes.

Dr. Quy relocated the rare eastern sarus crane, a species badly affected by the war, and helped to establish a treaty for the protection of migratory birds.

He suggested that the Vietnamese pheasant (Lophura hatinhensis) might be a different species from Edward's pheasant (Lophura edwardsi) although most ornithologists do not split these two forms.

He wrote the two-volume book, The Birds of Vietnam, and co-authored The Kouprey: An Action Plan for Its Conservation ISBN 2-88032-972-8. He died in Hanoi on January 10, 2017, at the age of 87.
