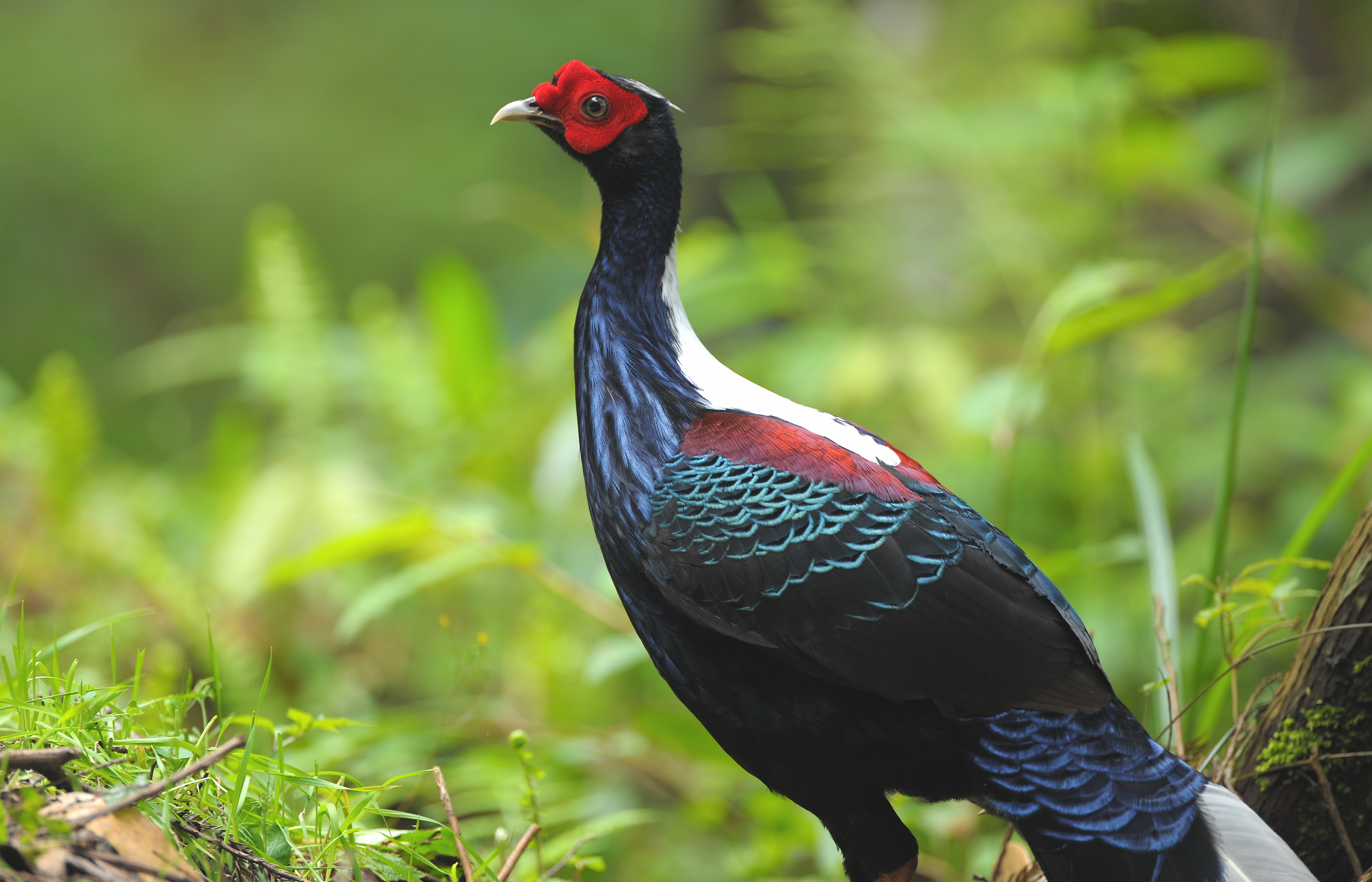
- Lophura swinhoii - Swinhoe pheasant

Scientific classification
- Kingdom: Animalia
- Phylum: Chordata
- Class: Aves
- Order: Galliformes
- Family: Phasianidae
- Tribe: Phasianini
- Genus: Lophura; Fleming, 1822

Type species
- Phasianus ignitus Shaw, 1797

= Gallopheasant =

Gallopheasants

Genus of birds

The gallopheasants (genus Lophura) are pheasants of the family Phasianidae. The genus comprises 11 species and several subspecies. Several species in this genus are known as firebacks, including crestless and crested firebacks, as well as the Siamese fireback.

== Taxonomy ==
The genus Lophura was introduced in 1822 by the Scottish naturalist John Fleming to accommodate a single species, the Bornean crested fireback (Phasianus ignitus Shaw, 1798) which is therefore considered to be the type species by monotypy. The genus name combines the Ancient Greek λοφος/lophos meaning "crest" with ουρα/oura meaning "tail".

== Species ==
The genus contains the following 11 species:

Image	Name	Common name	Distribution
	Lophura edwardsi	Edwards's pheasant	Vietnam
	Lophura swinhoii	Swinhoe's pheasant	Taiwan
	Lophura bulweri	Bulwer's pheasant	Borneo
	Lophura leucomelanos	kalij pheasant	Pakistan to western Thailand
	Lophura nycthemera	silver pheasant	mainland Southeast Asia, and eastern and southern China
	Lophura erythrophthalma	Malayan crestless fireback	Malay peninsula and Sumatra
	Lophura pyronota	Bornean crestless fireback	northern Borneo
	Lophura rufa	Malayan crested fireback	Thai-Malay Peninsula and Sumatra
	Lophura ignita	Bornean crested fireback	Borneo
	Lophura diardi	Siamese fireback	Cambodia, Laos, Thailand and Vietnam in Southeast Asia
	Lophura inornata	Salvadori's pheasant	Sumatra

The Vietnamese pheasant Lophura hatinhensis, formerly considered valid, has now been shown to be a variant of Edward's pheasant caused by inbreeding due to small population size.

The Imperial pheasant (Lophura × imperialis) is now known to be a hybrid between Edwards's pheasant (Lophura edwardsi) and a subspecies of silver pheasant (Lophura nycthemera annamensis).
