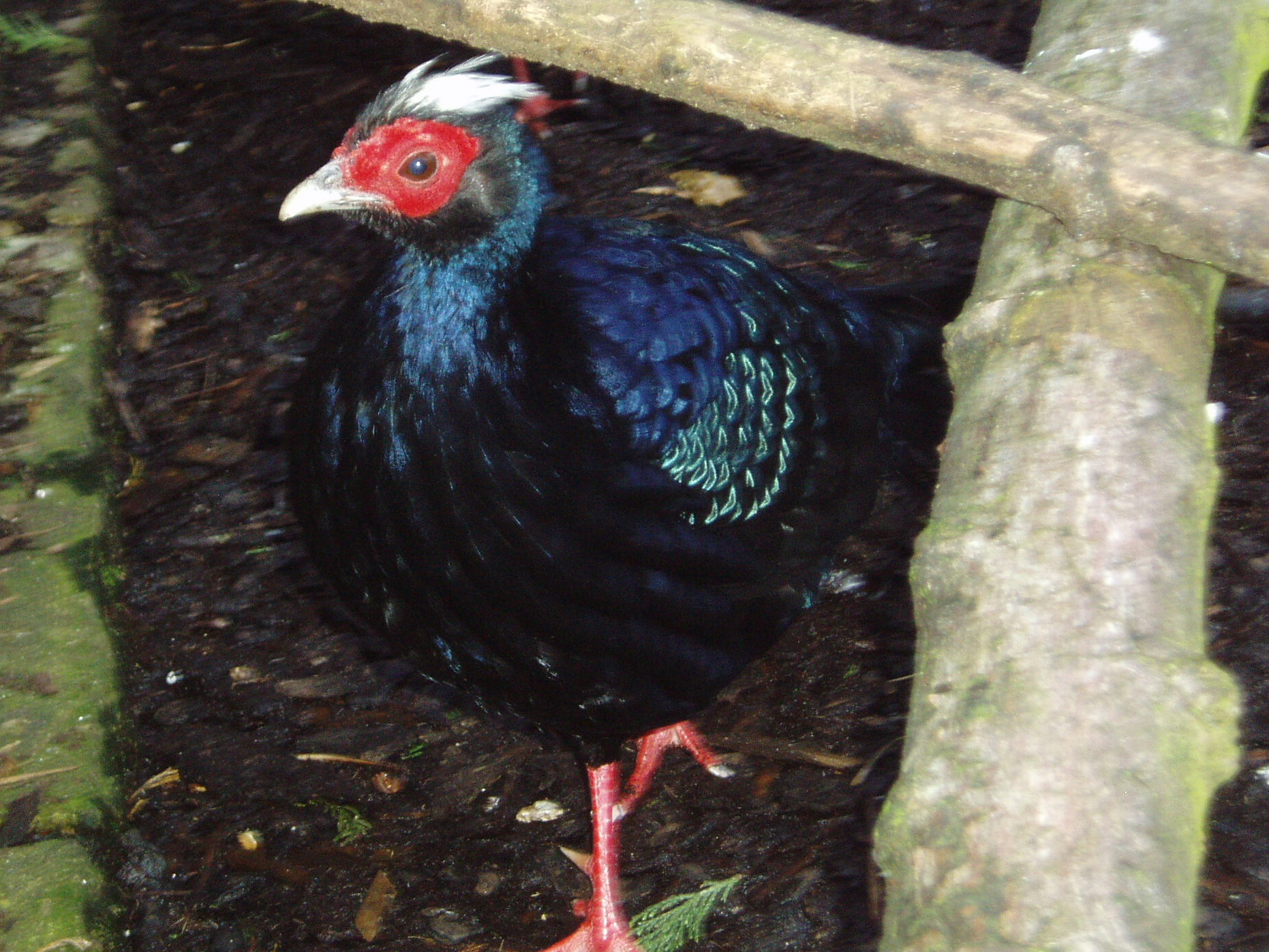
- Male
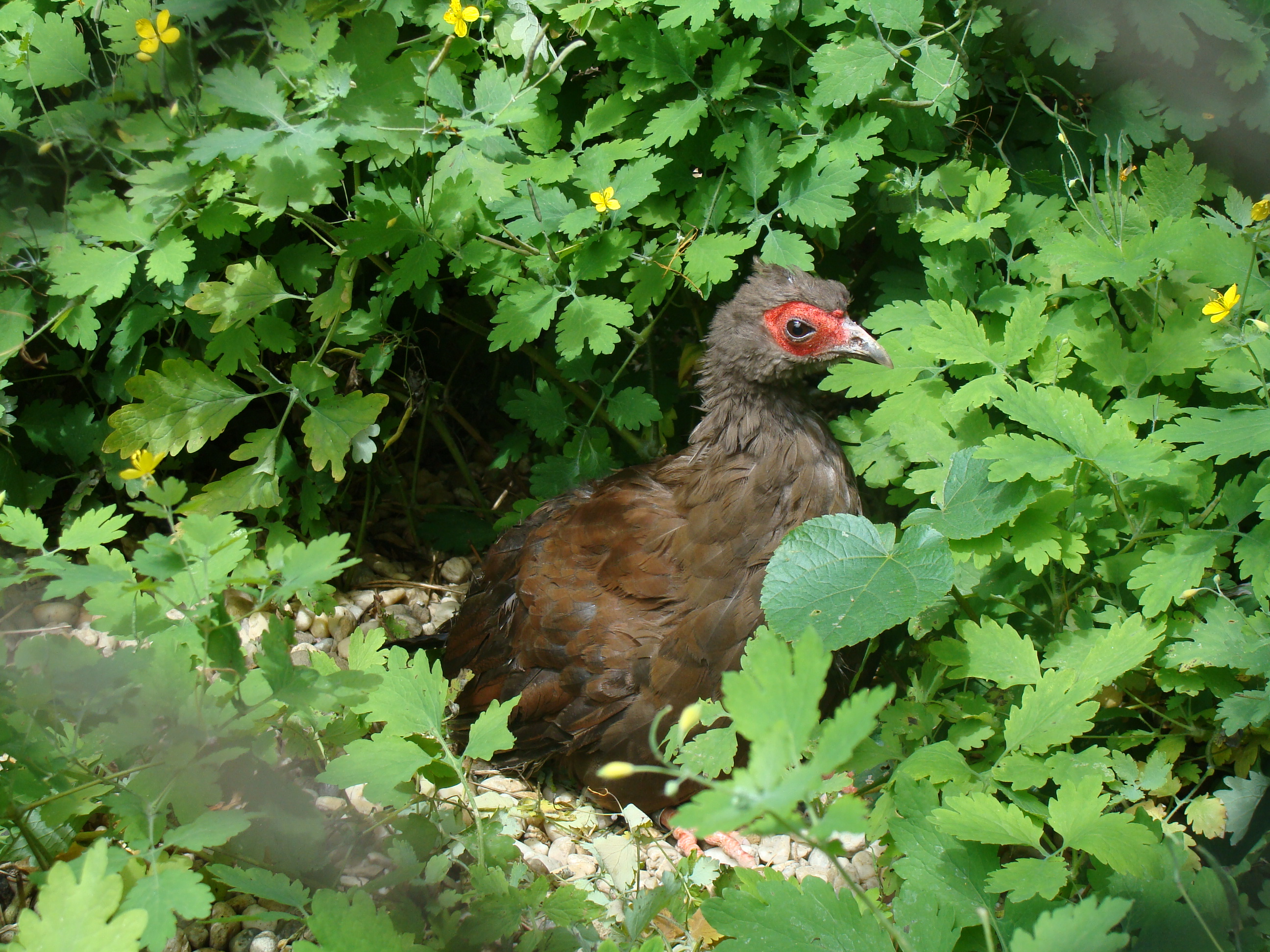
- Female, Zoo Bojnice, Slovakia

Conservation status
- Critically endangered, possibly extinct in the wild (IUCN 3.1)
- CITES Appendix I

Scientific classification
- Kingdom: Animalia
- Phylum: Chordata
- Class: Aves
- Order: Galliformes
- Family: Phasianidae
- Genus: Lophura
- Species: L. edwardsi

Binomial name
- Lophura edwardsi (Oustalet, 1896)

= Edwards's pheasant =

Species of bird

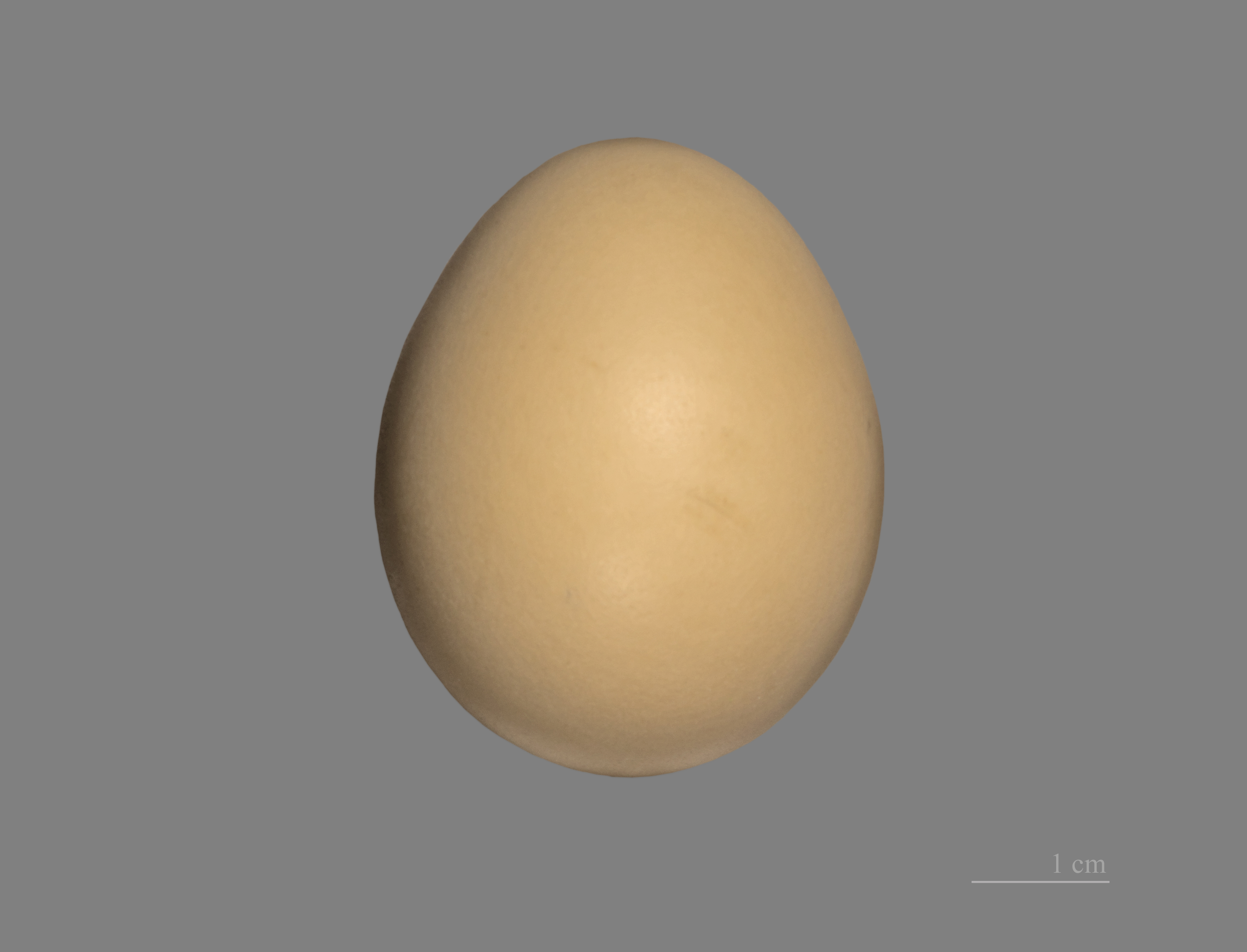
Lophura edwardsi – MHNT

Edwards's pheasant (Lophura edwardsi) is a bird of the pheasant family Phasianidae and is endemic to the seasonal tropical forests of central Vietnam. It is named after the French ornithologist Alphonse Milne-Edwards and first described to science in 1896. The bird's length is 58–65 centimetres (23–26 in) and has red legs and facial skin. The male is mainly blue-black with a crest, and the female is a drab brown bird. The alarm call is a puk!-puk!-puk!.

There are two varieties; the nominate form L. e. edwardsi has a white crest and upper tail, whereas the northern form, usually called Vietnamese pheasant, is found with a variable number of white rectrices. This difference in the two forms may be due to inbreeding of a restricted, fragmented population there, and has also been seen in captive, inbred L. edwardsi.

In 2012 the nominate form of Edwards's pheasant have been uplisted to Critically Endangered by BirdLife International, having suffered from deforestation, hunting and the use of defoliants during the Vietnam War. The population is currently believed to number between 50 and 249 birds in the wild, mostly of the nominate form, but it is doing well in captivity, where it is the subject of ex situ conservation. There have been no confirmed sightings of a living individual in the wild since 2000 and in 2010 the World Pheasant Association (WPA) received funding from the Critical Ecosystem Partnership Fund to survey forests in the central Vietnam provinces of Quảng Bình and Quảng Trị. It is considered possibly extinct in the wild as a result.

== Taxonomy and systematics ==
Edwards's pheasant was first observed in 1896. Twenty-eight years later, another species of Lophura, the Imperial pheasant (Lophura imperialis), was seen in the border area between Quang Binh and Quang Tri provinces. It was later proven to be a hybrid between the Edwards's pheasant and the Silver pheasant (Lophura nycthemera). The Vietnamese pheasant (Lophura hatinhensis), formerly considered a distinct taxon, has now been shown to be a variant of Edward's pheasant caused by inbreeding due to small population size.

== Description ==
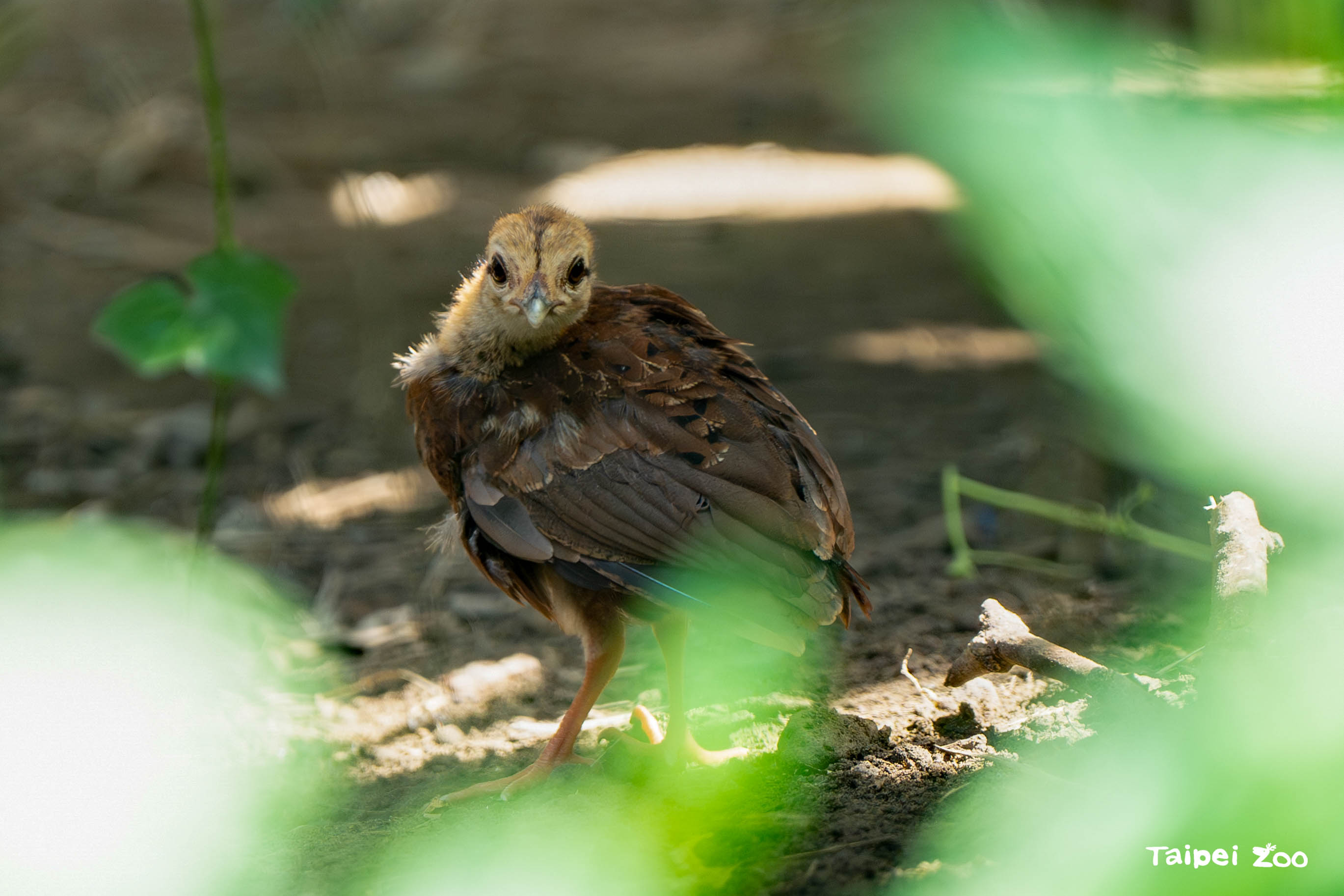
Chick

Edwards pheasants have a body length of 58-65 cm, including the tail length, which is about 24-26 cm for males, and 20-22 cm for females. Males are heavier, with a weight between 1115-1100 g, and females around 1050 g. Males are all black, with a blue tint throughout their feathers. Females are generally chestnut-brown with no crest.

== Distribution and habitat ==
Edwards's pheasant is endemic to central Vietnam and has been found in four provinces (Ha Tinh, Quang Binh, Quang Tri, and Thua Thien Hue). They live in evergreen forests with lots of palms and patches of bamboo. The birds often hide in the low vegetation, and females dig their nests in the grounds of these forests. Edward's pheasants do not commonly migrate because they are not affected by cold weather and can spend most winters outside.

== Ecology ==
=== Song and call ===
Male birds have a wing-whirring sound. Their alarm call is a low guttural "uk uk uk uk uk", sometimes a hard "puk puk puk puk puk".

=== Diet ===
Edward's pheasants have rarely been observed in the wild, so little is known about its behavior in its natural habitat.

An Edwards's pheasant at Denver Zoo's diet consists of mealworms, chopped fruit, and greens, specially formulated game bird diet.

=== Reproduction ===
Edward's pheasants usually breed between the months of March and May. Males push their chests, vibrate their wings, and erect the feathers on their backs to find their mate. Females can begin to breed after two years, while their maximum fertility is usually around ages 4-5. On average, females lay between 4-7 eggs each time. The females make the nests well hidden and dug into the group, usually with plant debris and bamboo overtop. The female incubates eggs for around 20-22 days. However, the male remains stationed close to guard the bird. The eggs are round and have a faint pink color with dotted cream spots. Juveniles are primarily chestnut-brown.

== Conservation status and management ==
Lophura edwardsi was assessed for The IUCN Red List of Threatened Species in 2018 and listed as Critically Endangered. It is one of the most endangered species of Galliformes. Their population is decreasing, with 50-249 mature individuals right now, according to IUCN Red List. Any remaining subpopulations are likely to be extremely small and declining. They have not been spotted in the wild since the year 2000. Intense hunting and trapping, habitat loss due to herbicide spraying during the Vietnam War, logging, and clearance for agriculture has significantly affected the population of this species. Khe Nuoc Trong, Bac Huong Hoa, Phong Dien, and Ke Go are reserves where these birds could reside. An Action Plan was published for this species in 2015.

The Phong Điền Nature Reserve was initially designated to protect the Edward's pheasant after the rediscovery of the species in the area in 1996. In 2018, a photograph of a dead female Edwards's pheasant was taken in A Lưới District, which includes part of Phong Điền; this marked the first evidence of a wild Edwards's pheasant in almost two decades, and indicates that the species may still persist in the reserve.
