= Stephen Green-Armytage =

British freelance photographer

Stephen Green-Armytage is a British freelance photographer. He has worked for such magazines as Fortune (magazine), Travel & Leisure, the Smithsonian (magazine), Sports Illustrated, and Life (magazine) throughout his career of 44 years. Green-Armytage now works as a commercial photographer in New York City.

== Books ==
Green-Armytage made the transition from magazines to books in the early nineties with his first publication: Dudley. He is quoted as saying (on the purpose of his transition):

"Magazine-length coverage is enough for many subjects, particularly in an age of shrinking attention spans. But there are cases when a subject is large, and it is a shame to handle it superficially. It can be frustrating to be dealing with a theme that deserves book-length treatment, but instead be limited to no more coverage than a magazine has space to print.”

Green-Armytage's books mainly focus on birds and creatures. The books are mostly picture books accompanied with short descriptions of topics, highlighting his photography skills.

A list of Green-Armytage's books follows:

- Dudley
- Extraordinary Chickens
- Extra Extraordinary Chickens
- Extraordinary Pigs
- Extraordinary Pheasants
- Extraordinary Leaves
- Extraordinary Pigeons
