= Imperial pheasant =

Scientific classification
- Kingdom: Animalia
- Phylum: Chordata
- Class: Aves
- Order: Galliformes
- Family: Phasianidae
- Genus: Lophura
- Species: L. × imperialis

Binomial name
- Lophura × imperialis Delacour & Jabouille, 1924

Hybrid bird

The imperial pheasant (Lophura × imperialis) is a gallopheasant from Southeast Asia. Long thought to be an enigmatic and elusive species, a detailed investigation in 2003 showed it to be a hybrid between Edwards's pheasant (Lophura edwardsi) and a subspecies of silver pheasant (Lophura nycthemera annamensis).

The imperial pheasant is a dark blue, medium-sized, up to 75 cm long pheasant with bare red facial skin, blue crest, crimson legs and glossy plumage. The female is brown with erectile short feather crest, blackish tail and primaries. This pheasant is found in the forests of Vietnam and Laos. Its appearance resembles another of Vietnam's enigmatic birds, the Vietnamese pheasant, but it is larger in size, has a longer tail, and an all dark blue crest and tail feathers. The latter species has a white crest and central tail feathers.

Previously known only from a pair taken alive to Europe by Jean Théodore Delacour in 1923, a specimen of this bird was rediscovered in 1990, when an immature male was trapped by a rattan collector. Another immature male was caught in February 2000.
