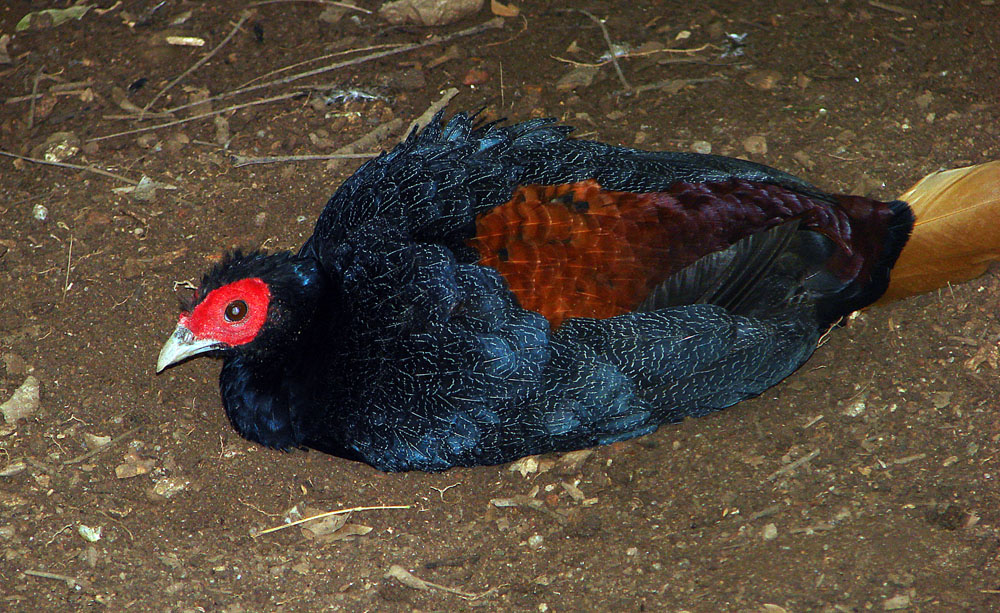
- At Jurong Bird Park

Conservation status
- Critically Endangered (IUCN 3.1)

Scientific classification
- Kingdom: Animalia
- Phylum: Chordata
- Class: Aves
- Order: Galliformes
- Family: Phasianidae
- Genus: Lophura
- Species: L. erythrophthalma

Binomial name
- Lophura erythrophthalma (Raffles, 1822)

= Malayan crestless fireback =

Species of bird

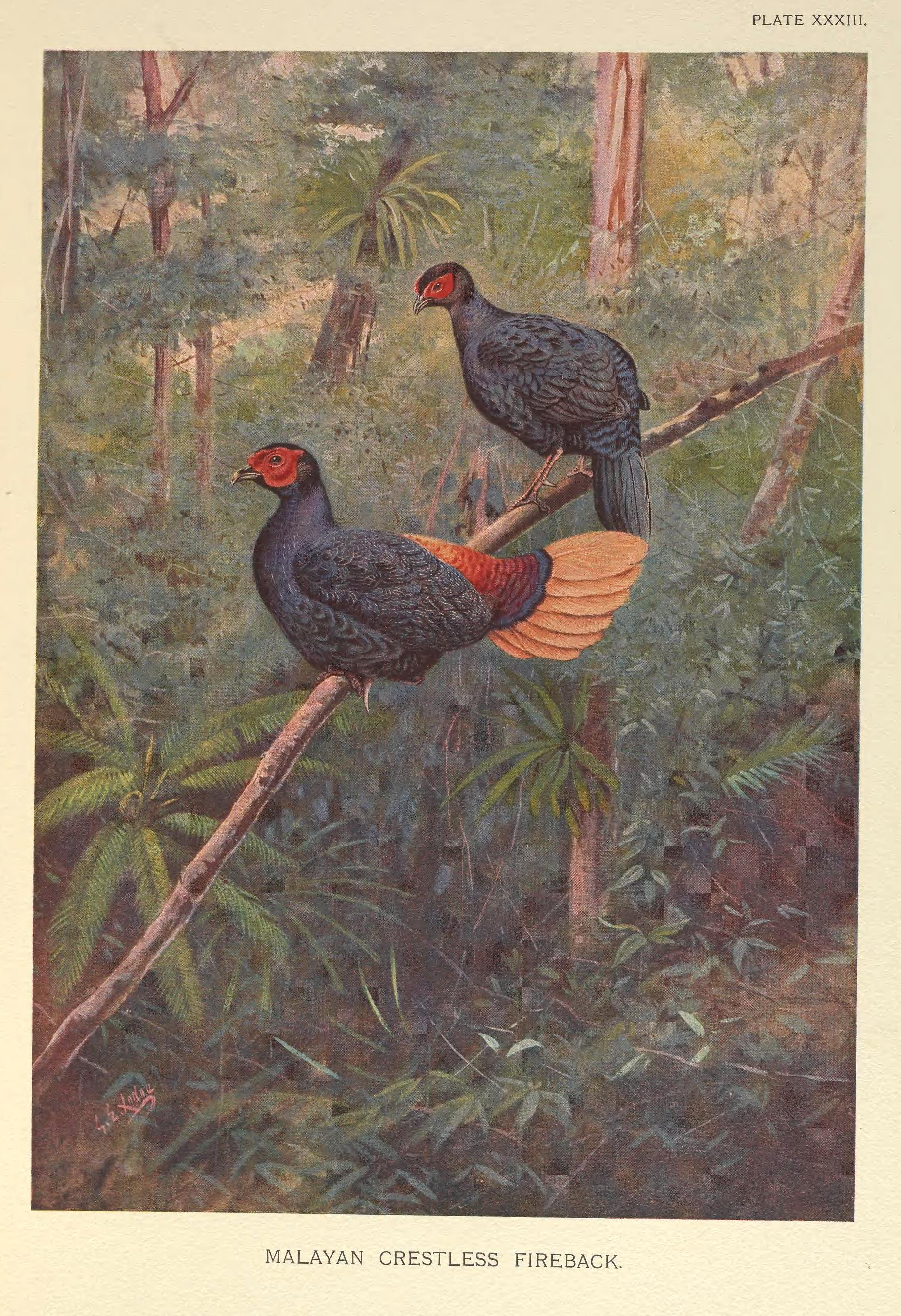
Illustration by George Edward Lodge

The Malayan crestless fireback or Malay crestless fireback (Lophura erythrophthalma) is a member of the family Phasianidae. It was previously known as the crestless fireback when it was lumped together with the Bornean crestless fireback. The two species were separated into two monotypic species based on obvious plumage differences, most notably the virtually unmarked dark plumage of the male.

The Malayan crestless fireback is found in the Malay Peninsula and Sumatra.
