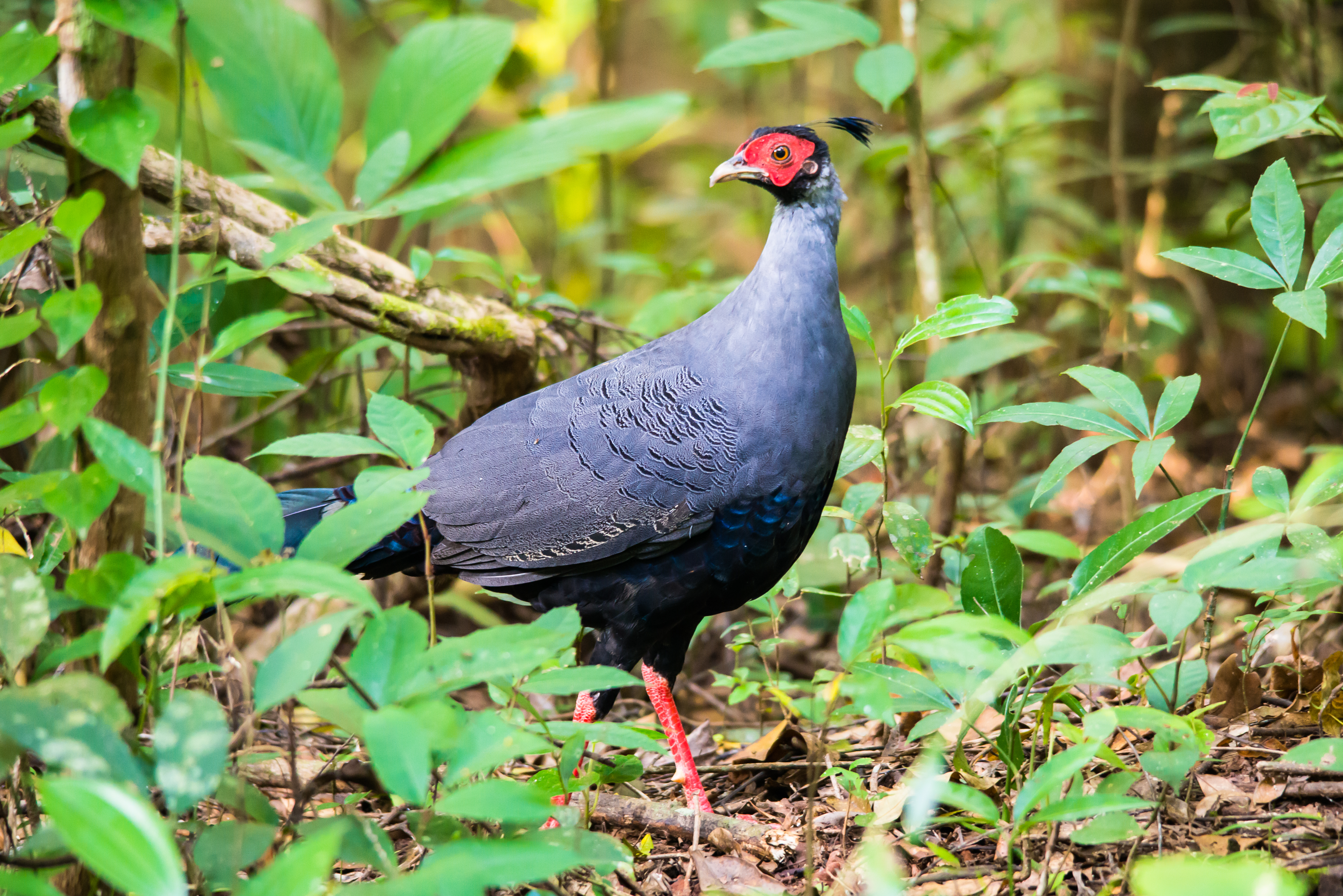
- Cock bird

Conservation status
- Least Concern (IUCN 3.1)

Scientific classification
- Kingdom: Animalia
- Phylum: Chordata
- Class: Aves
- Order: Galliformes
- Family: Phasianidae
- Genus: Lophura
- Species: L. diardi

Binomial name
- Lophura diardi (Bonaparte, 1856)

= Siamese fireback =

Species of bird

The Siamese fireback (Lophura diardi), also known as Diard's fireback, is a fairly large, approximately 80 cm (31 in) long, pheasant. The male has a grey plumage with an extensive facial caruncle, crimson legs and feet, ornamental black crest feathers, reddish brown iris and long curved blackish tail. The female is a brown bird with blackish wings and tail feathers.

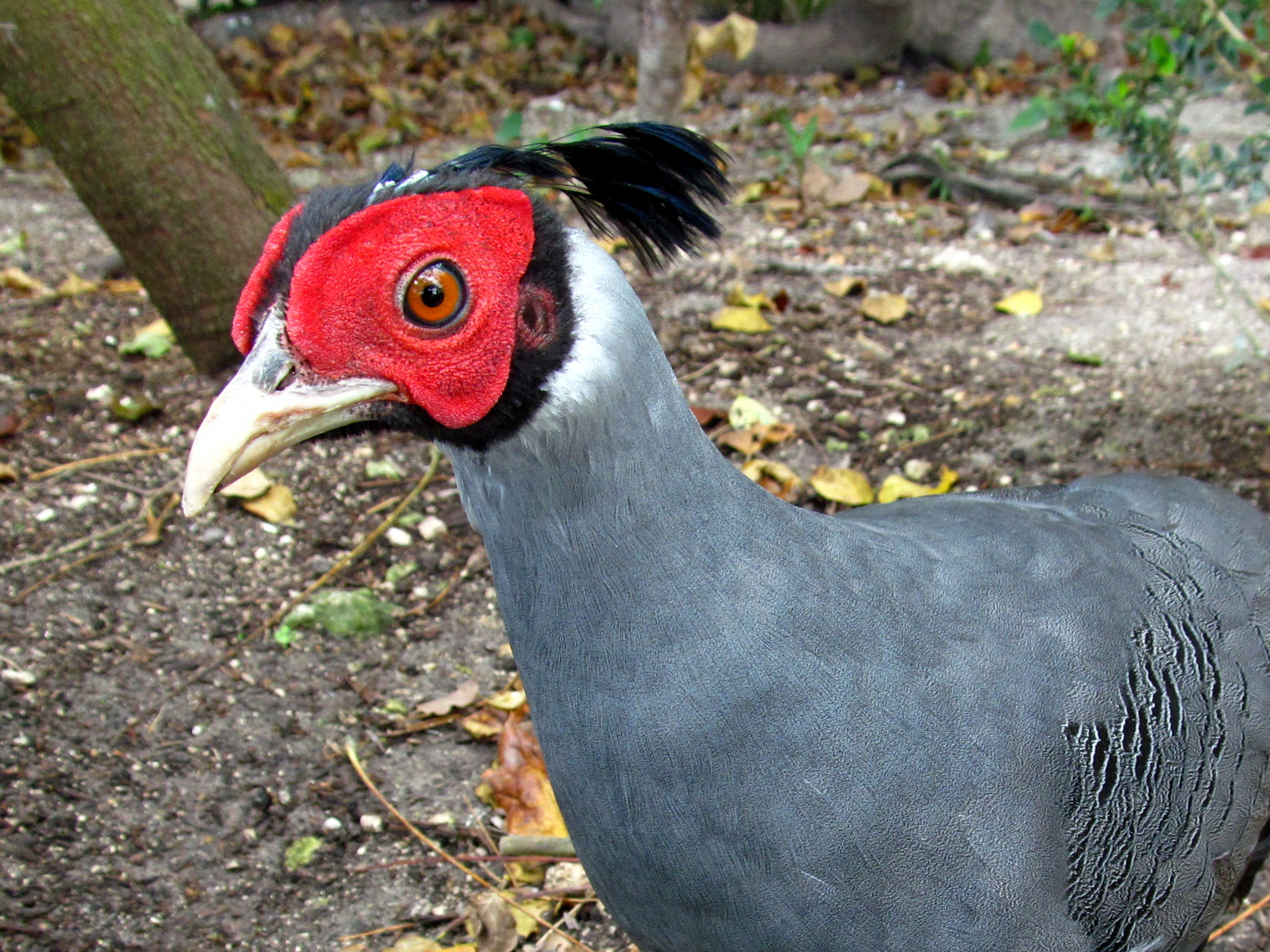
Head

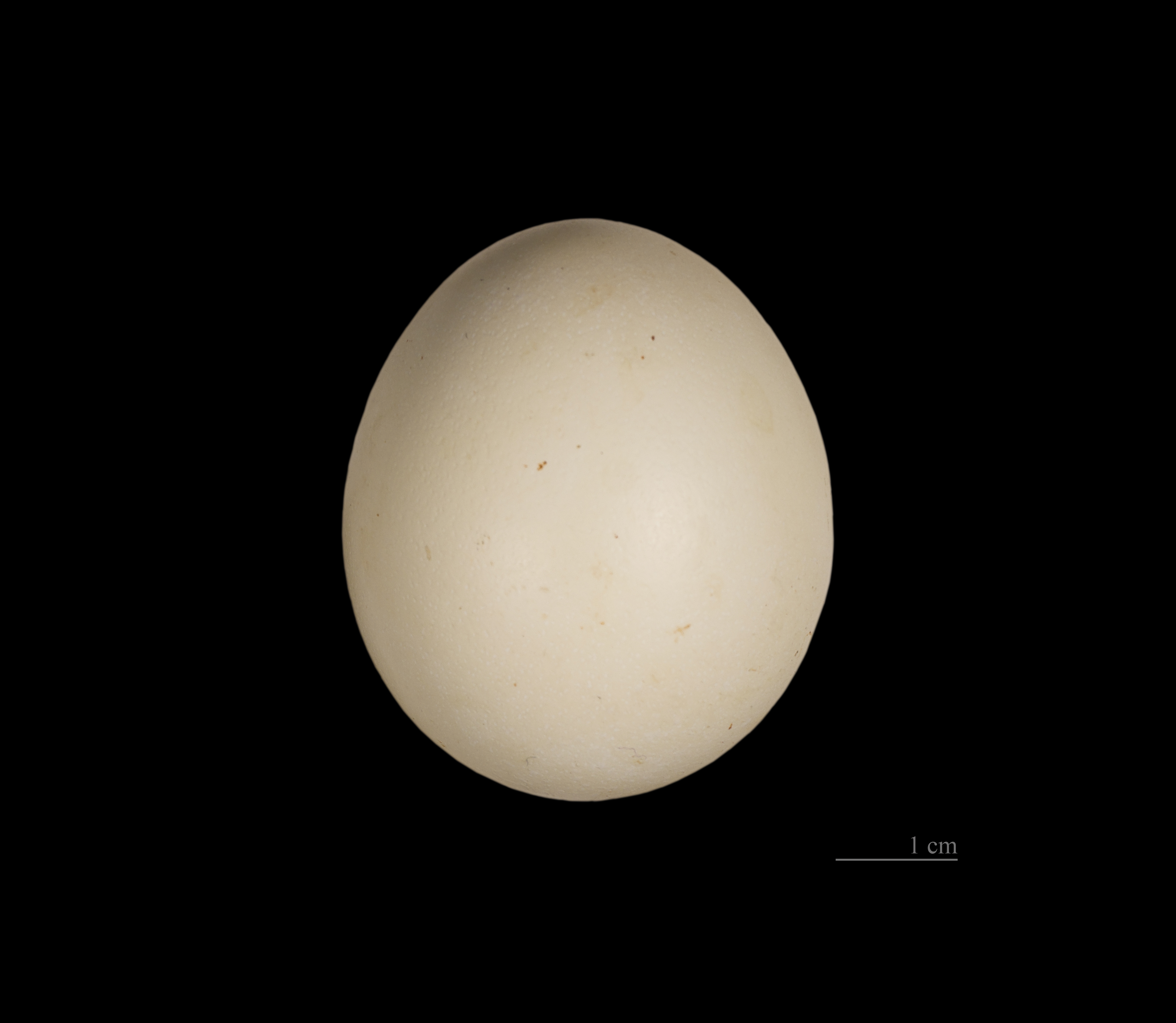
Lophura diardi

The Siamese fireback is distributed to the lowland and evergreen forests of Cambodia, Laos, Thailand, and Vietnam in Southeast Asia. However, in June 2025, the bird was spotted naturally in the forest area of Ranikhet, a popular tourist destination in Uttarakhand, India. This species is also designated as Thailand's national bird. The female usually lays between four and eight rosy eggs.

== Naming ==
The scientific name commemorates the French naturalist Pierre-Médard Diard.

This species of pheasant has a common name in Thai Kai Fah Phaya Lo (Thai: ไก่ฟ้าพญาลอ; Lord Lo's pheasant), according to Thai folk literature, Lilit Phra Lo where Phra Lo, the protagonist, is charmed by following the pheasant until he meets Phra Phuean and Phra Phaeng, the two sisters and later his lovers.

== Status ==
Due to habitat loss and over-hunting in some areas, the Siamese fireback was evaluated as Near Threatened on the IUCN Red List; however, it is now Least Concern.

== Gallery ==
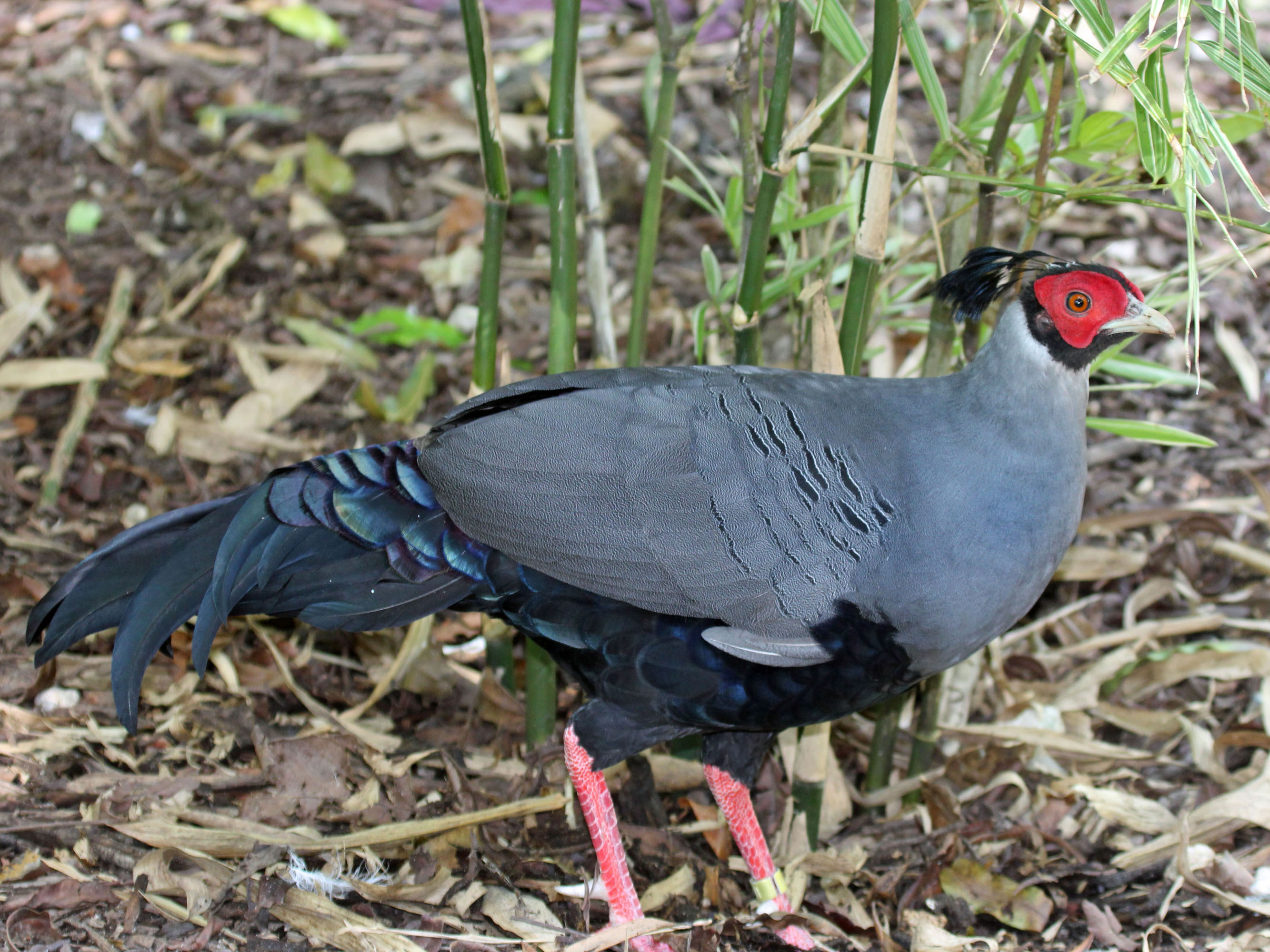

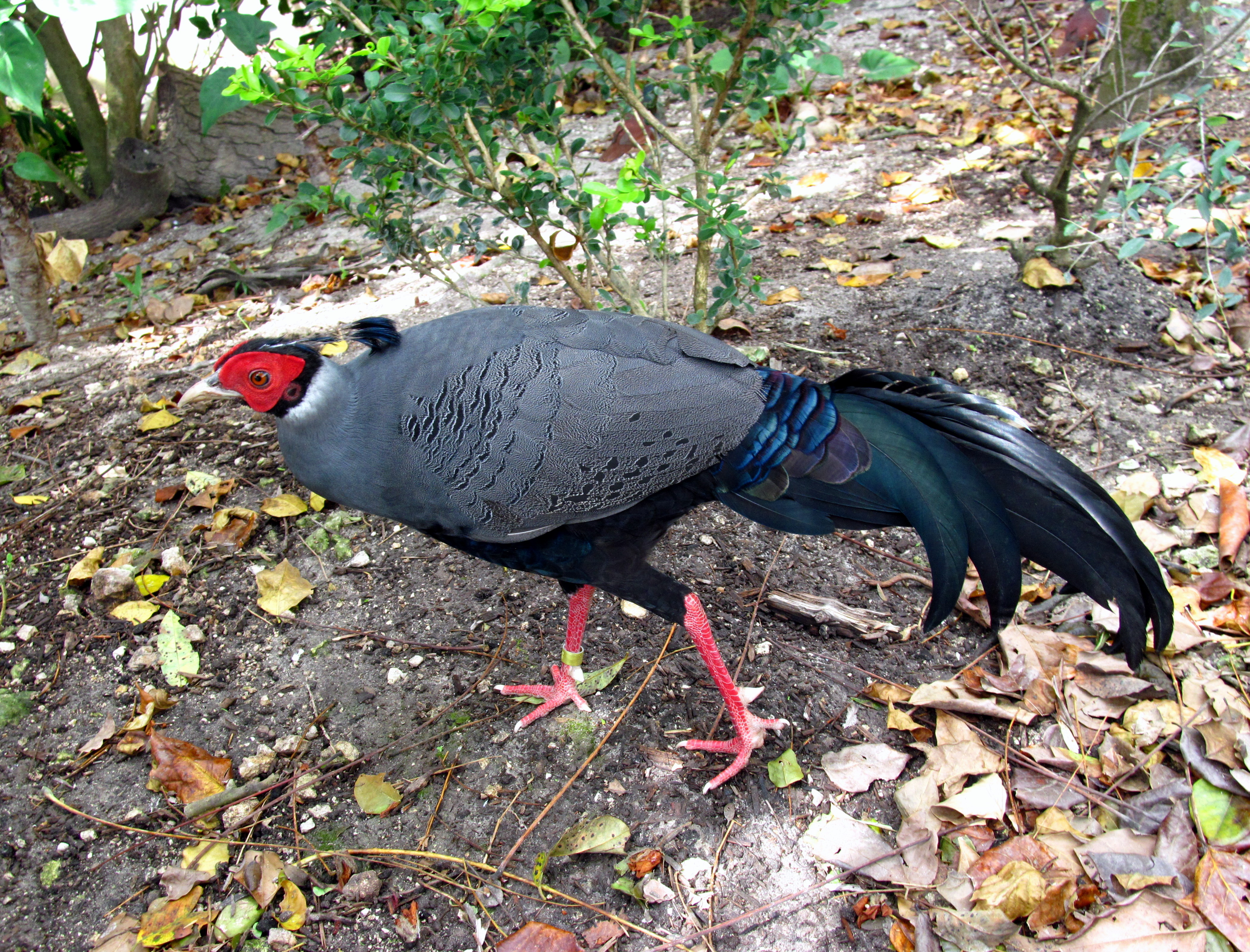
Siamese fireback in captivity - Florida, USA

== See also ==
- National symbols of Thailand
