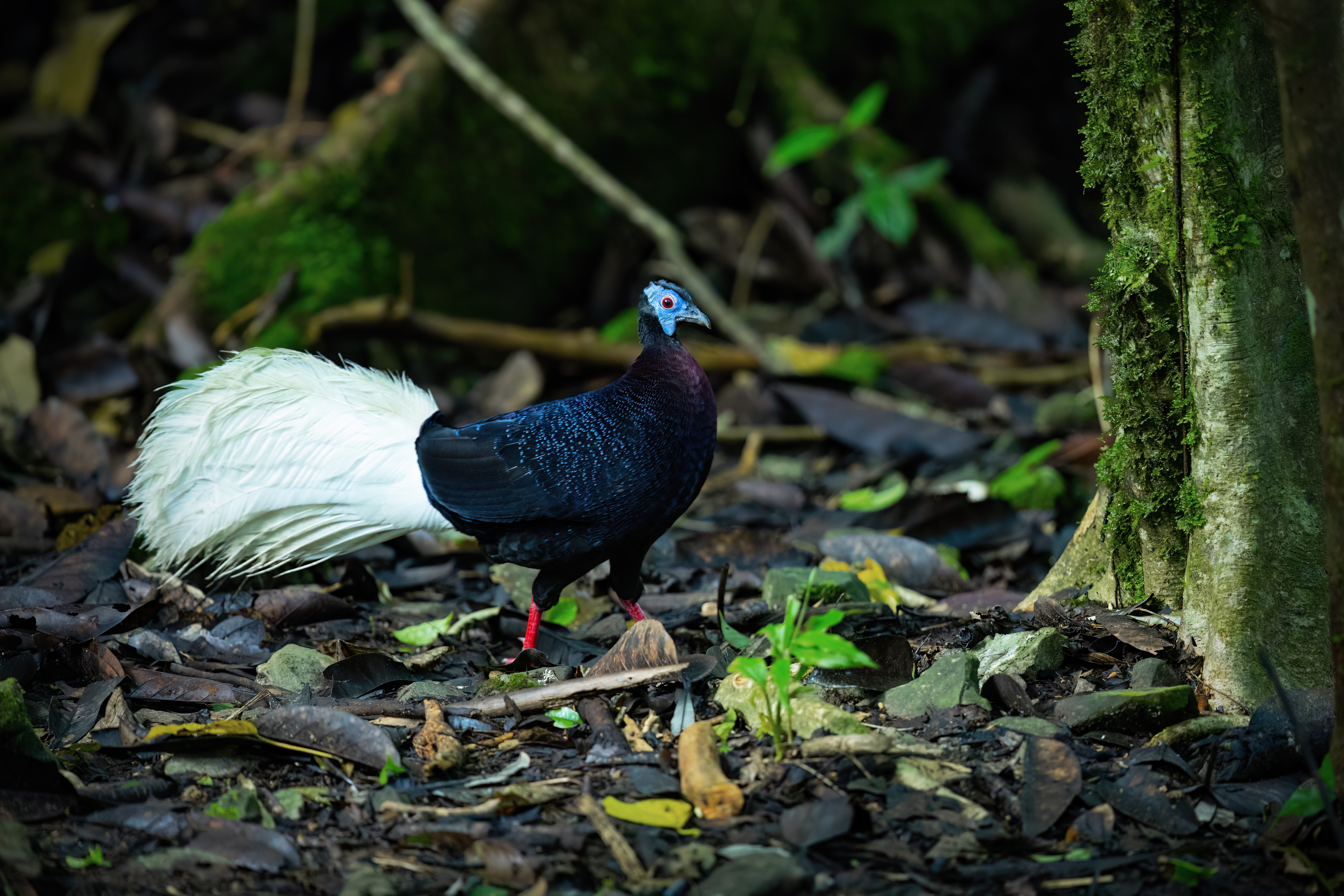
- Wild adult male in Sabah, Malaysia

Conservation status
- Vulnerable (IUCN 3.1)

Scientific classification
- Kingdom: Animalia
- Phylum: Chordata
- Class: Aves
- Order: Galliformes
- Family: Phasianidae
- Genus: Lophura
- Species: L. bulweri

Binomial name
- Lophura bulweri (Sharpe, 1874)

Synonyms
- Lobiophasis bulweri

= Bulwer's pheasant =

Species of bird

Bulwer's pheasant (Lophura bulweri), also known as Bulwer's wattled pheasant, the wattled pheasant or the white-tailed wattled pheasant, is a Southeast Asian bird in the family Phasianidae endemic to the forests of Borneo. It is currently listed as Vulnerable by the IUCN.

== Etymology ==
Bulwer's pheasant belongs to the order Galliformes, in the family Phasianidae. The genus name Lophura is derived from the Greek word lophos for ridge, crest or tuft. The species name bulweri is after Sir Henry Ernest Gascoyne Bulwer, Governor of Labuan 1871–1875, who presented the type specimen to the British Museum.

== Description ==
Bulwer's pheasant is sexually dimorphic. Males have a total length of about 80 centimetres (31 in), and are black-plumaged with a maroon breast, crimson legs, a pure white tail of long, curved feathers, and bright blue facial skin with two wattles that conceal the sides of its head. Females have a total length of about 55 centimetres (22 in), and are an overall dull brown colour with red legs and blue facial skin.

== Distribution and habitat ==
Bulwer's pheasant is endemic to the island of Borneo. While the species is locally common in protected areas (e.g. Kayan Mentarang National Park, East Kalimantan) it is rarely found elsewhere. The bird inhabits hill and lower montane tropical forest, likely preferring highland rainforests and rarely visiting the lowlands below an altitude of 300 metres (980 ft). The diet consists mainly of fruits, worms, and insects.

== Status ==
Bulwer's pheasant is listed as Vulnerable on the IUCN Red List of Threatened Species due to a rapidly declining population. The primary reasons for this decline are habitat loss and fragmentation due to commercial logging and forest fires. Local hunting is also thought to undermine the birds population. Further, captive breeding programs aimed at preserving the species have met with little success. John Roach from National Geographic offers another explanation for their decline in numbers by saying "the birds themselves seem to find each other somewhat less than appealing" in speaking with ornithologist John Rowden of the Wildlife Conservation Society in New York City and curator of animals at the Central Park Zoo.

== Captivity ==
This species is very rarely kept in zoos due to mating problems. The only western zoos to house the species are San Diego Zoo which kept three males and the San Antonio Zoo which had a mother-son pair in 2000. Neither zoo currently lists the bird as an exhibit in 2017. Walsrode Bird Park in Germany has kept the birds as recently as 2003, and Antwerp Zoo, Belgium, has bred the birds. Antwerp Zoo has been very successful with many members of the genus Lophura. In Pairi Daiza two males arrived in 2018, which made the zoo at the time the only one in Europe with this species in its collection. This individual has, however, died since, in 2022; due to a fox attack.
