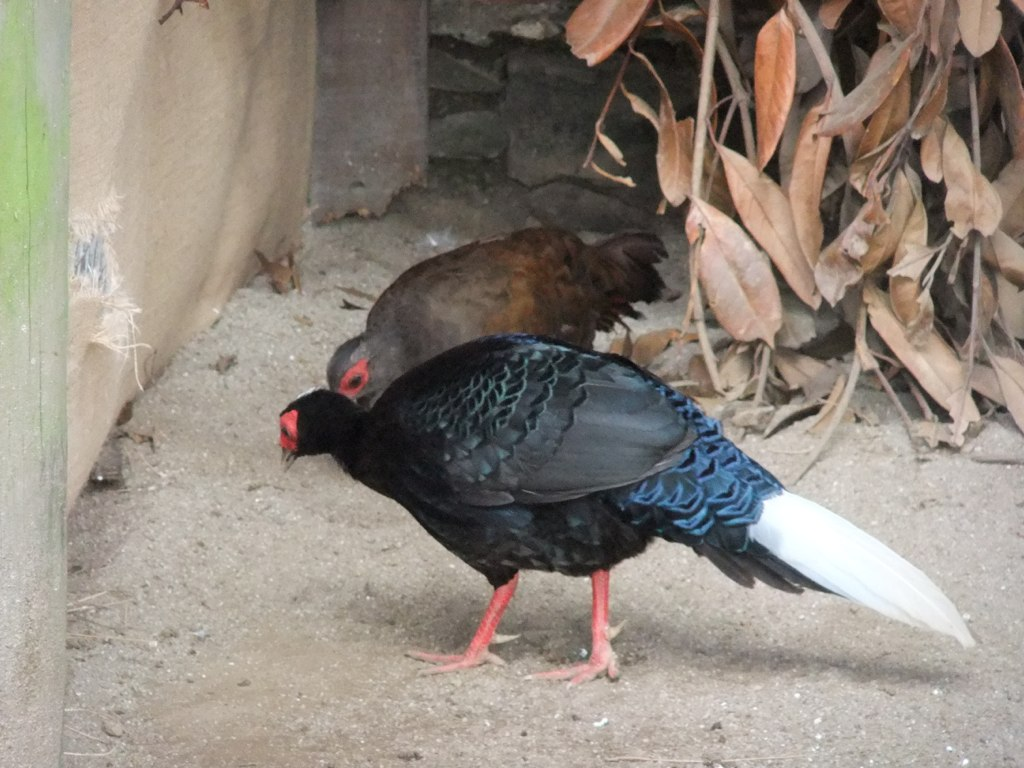
- A pair at Camperdown Wildlife Centre, Dundee, Angus, Scotland

Scientific classification
- Kingdom: Animalia
- Phylum: Chordata
- Class: Aves
- Order: Galliformes
- Family: Phasianidae
- Genus: Lophura
- Species: L. hatinhensis

Binomial name
- Lophura hatinhensis Võ Quý, 1975

Synonyms
- ?Lophura edwardsi hatinhensis

= Vietnamese pheasant =

Species of bird

The Vietnamese pheasant, or Vietnam fireback, was formerly considered a species of gallopheasant, Lophura hatinhensis, but is now considered a variant of Edwards's pheasant caused by inbreeding due to small population size. Discovered in 1964, it is endemic to central Vietnam. Its range concentrates around Kẻ Gỗ Nature Reserve in Hà Tĩnh Province.

== Habitat ==
The fireback inhabits primary and secondary (including logged) evergreen forest in lowlands and hills from sea level (at least historically) to about 300 m. It may tolerate habitat degradation, but is apparently far more common in closed-canopy forest, and has been trapped in dense, streamside vegetation.
