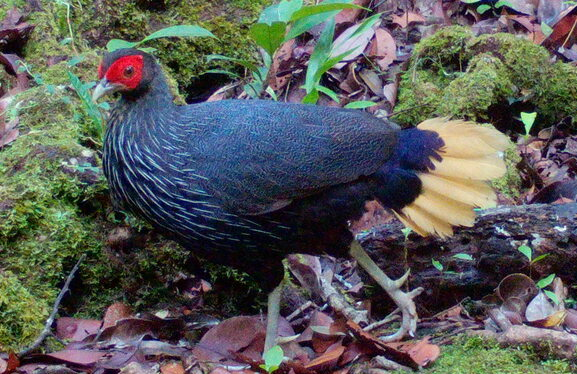
- Bornean crestless fireback in Central Kalimantan, Indonesia

Conservation status
- Endangered (IUCN 3.1)

Scientific classification
- Kingdom: Animalia
- Phylum: Chordata
- Class: Aves
- Order: Galliformes
- Family: Phasianidae
- Genus: Lophura
- Species: L. pyronota

Binomial name
- Lophura pyronota (GR Gray, 1841)

= Bornean crestless fireback =

Species of bird

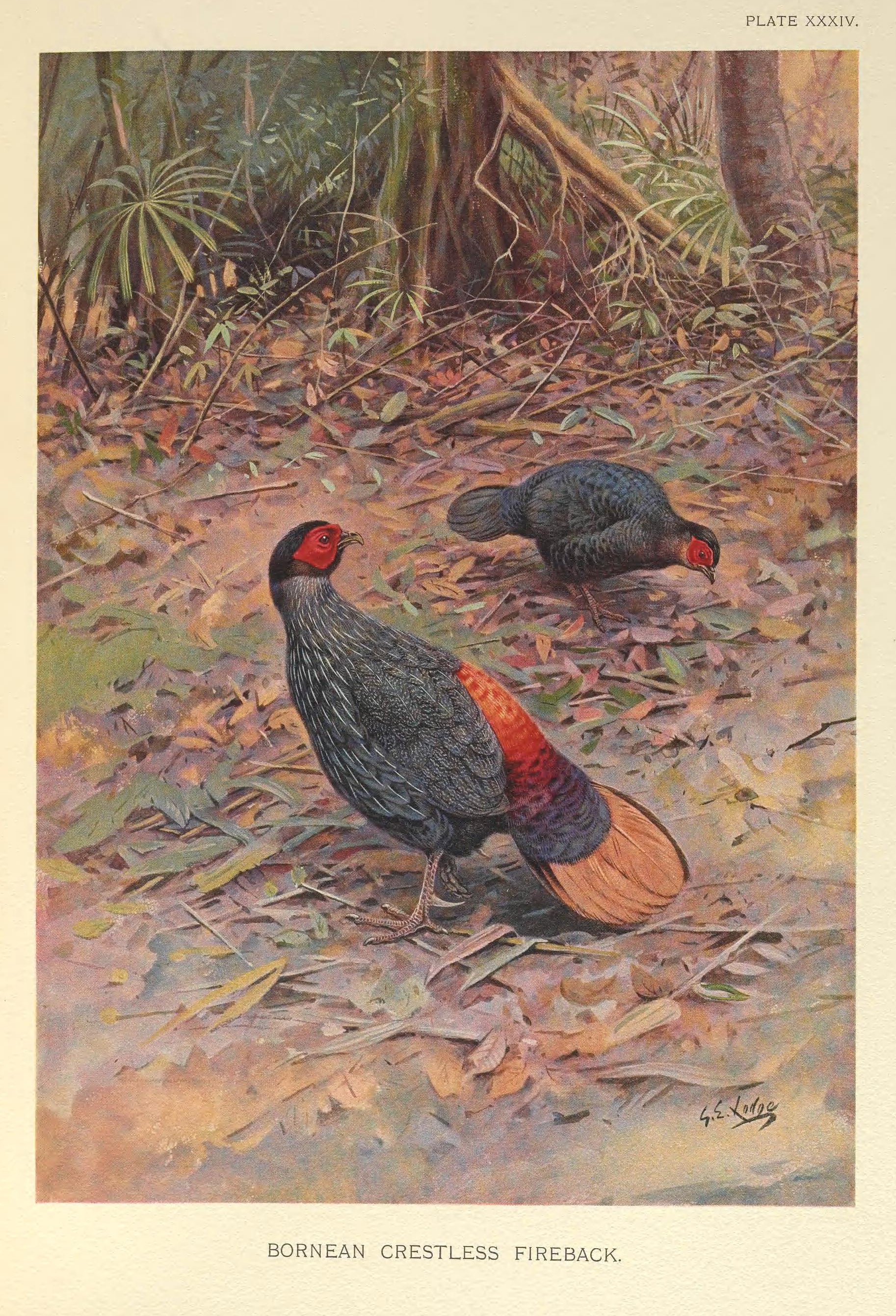
Illustration by George Edward Lodge

The Bornean crestless fireback (Lophura pyronota) is a member of the Phasianidae. It was previously known as the crestless fireback when it was lumped together with the species malayan crestless fireback. The two species were separated into two monotypic species based on obvious plumage differences, most notably the dark plumage of the male, which shows silvery white streaks.

The Bornean crestless fireback is found in northern Borneo.
