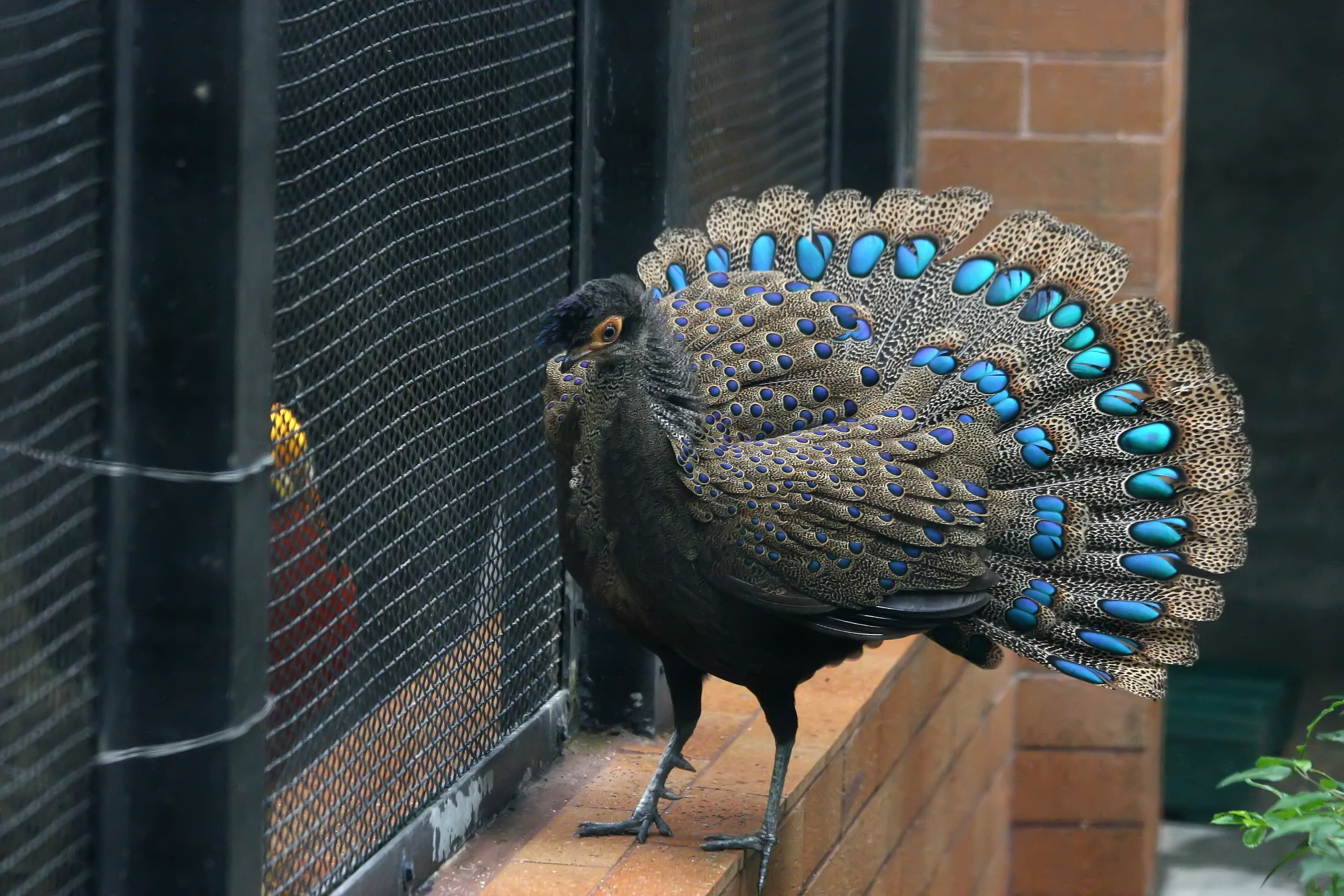
- Adult male at Hong Kong Zoological and Botanical Gardens
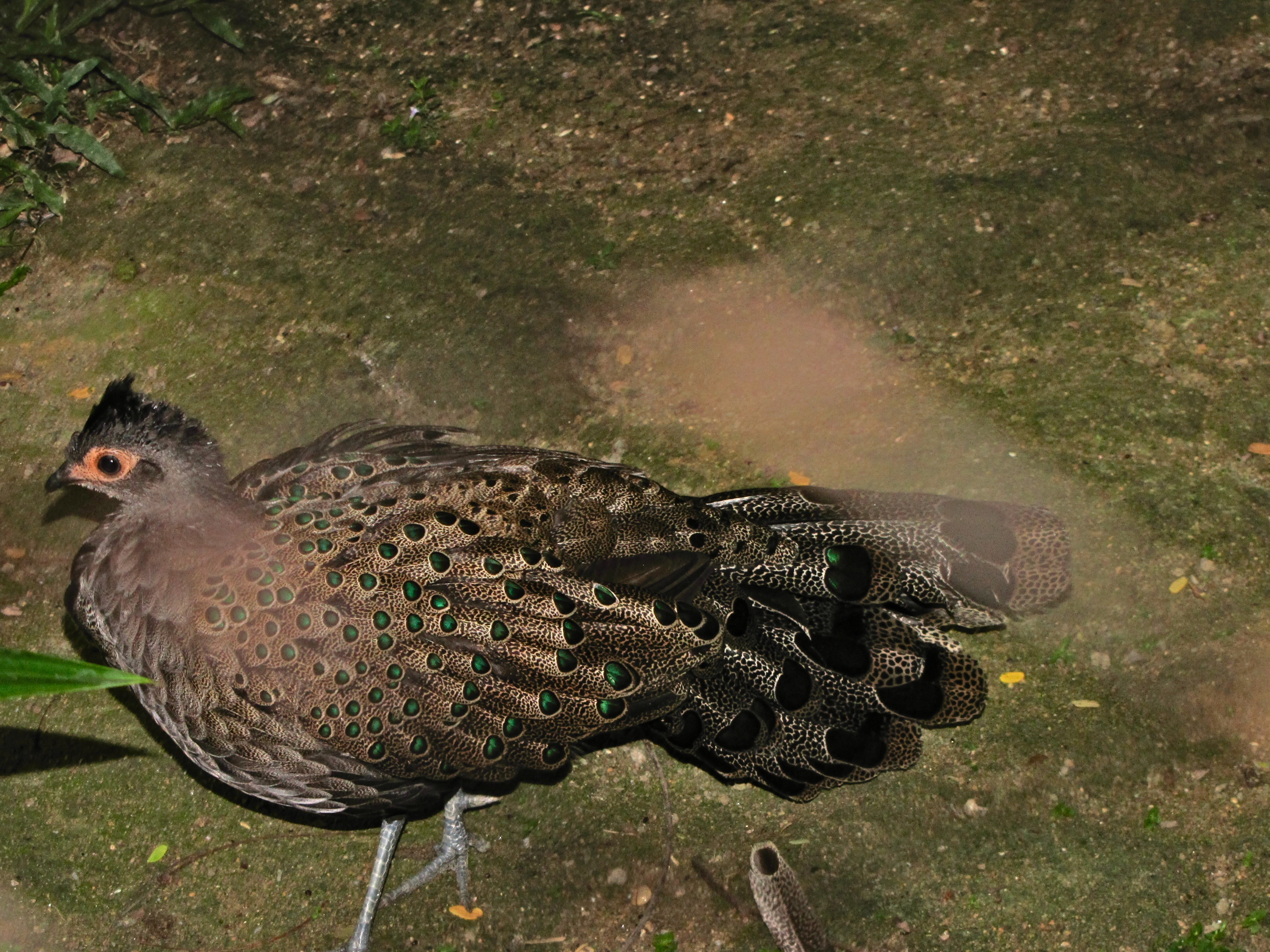
- Adult female at Kuala Lumpur Bird Park

Conservation status
- Endangered (IUCN 3.1)
- CITES Appendix II

Scientific classification
- Kingdom: Animalia
- Phylum: Chordata
- Class: Aves
- Order: Galliformes
- Family: Phasianidae
- Genus: Polyplectron
- Species: P. malacense

Binomial name
- Polyplectron malacense (Scopoli, 1786)

Synonyms
- Pavo malacensis Scopoli, 1786; Polyplectron bicalcaratum (non Linnaeus, 1758: preoccupied); Polyplectron malacense malacense (Scopoli, 1786)

= Malayan peacock-pheasant =

Species of bird

The Malayan peacock-pheasant (Polyplectron malacense) also known as crested peacock-pheasant or Malaysian peacock-pheasant, is a medium-sized pheasant of the galliform family Phasianidae. The closely related Bornean peacock-pheasant (P. schleiermacheri) was formerly included here as a subspecies, but as understood today, P. malacense is monotypic.

== Description ==
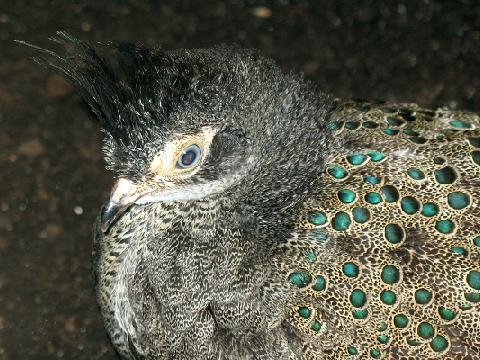
Head of adult male

It is one of the shortest-tailed peacock-pheasants. Adult males are about 50 cm long, about half of which is made up by the tail. Their tarsus measures approximately 6.5 cm, and their wings are 20–21 cm long; they weigh from over 600 to nearly 700 g.

The female is slightly smaller than the male, with a noticeably shorter tail; measuring about 40 cm overall, its tail is slightly less than 20 cm long, while its tarsus measures c.6 cm and its wing length is 18 cm. Adult females weigh about 450-550 g.

=== Plumage ===
Their plumage is generally pale brown with small black spots and bands all over, creating the "salt-and-pepper" effect found in most peacock-pheasants. It has iridescent blue-green eyespots with a buff border on its upperwings, back, and on the 22 rectrices, a white throat running down to the center of the breast, and a loose, pointed and upturned dark blue-green crest on its forehead. A bare facial skin surrounds the eyes with their bluish-white iris; usually pink, it becomes bright orange-red during courtship. The bill and legs are blackish.

Female plumage is duller than in males, with a vestigial crest and eyespots only on remiges and rectrices. On the wing coverts and back, they have dark dots instead, which are pointed towards the feather tip.

Young birds resemble females but have even less-developed eyespots and usually lack them entirely except on the rectrices. The downy hatchlings are pale chestnut-brown above and buff below.

== Systematics ==
mtDNA cytochrome b and D-loop as well as the nuclear ovomucoid intron G sequence data places the Malayan peacock-pheasant within the basal radiation of its genus, together with the even more elusive Bornean peacock-pheasant (P. schleiermacheri) – and Palawan peacock-pheasant (P. napoleonis). The common ancestor of the Malay peacock-pheasants probably diverged from its relatives during the Pliocene or maybe Late Miocene, about 5 million years ago (Ma) perhaps.

When the lineages of Borneo and Malaya diverged has not been studied; considering the phylogeny of Polyplectron, an Early Pleistocene date, roughly around 1 Ma, seems reasonable. In that regard, it is probably significant that Borneo was connected to the Southeast Asian mainland during Pleistocene glacial periods with low sea levels. In any case, the phylogeny and biogeography of the basal peacock-pheasants agrees with the idea of reproductive isolation due to rising sea levels during the last ice age's interglacials, whereas the more advanced Polyplectron species are limited to today's mainland Southeast Asia.

== Ecology ==
A shy and elusive bird, the Malay peacock-pheasant is endemic to lowland forests of the Malay Peninsula from the Isthmus of Kra region southwards. At one time, this species was widespread in Malaysia and Thailand, and reported from southern Myanmar, Sumatra and Singapore, but it probably never occurred in the former two at least in historic times. It has since disappeared from most of its former range, with the remaining population being confined to the lowlands of central Malaysia, perhaps extending barely into Thailand. Although nothing certain is known, there is nothing to suggest that this species is anything other than a sedentary bird; individuals probably do not move a long distance from their place of hatching. They are somewhat territorial, but the ranges of several birds probably overlap except for the core areas. Males move about in an area of approximately 10–60 hectares, while the ranges of females are half that size. The average population density in suitable habitat is estimated as slightly less than seven adult birds per square kilometer.

It inhabits mainly dipterocarp rainforest up to 150 m ASL, rarely occurring even as low as 300 m ASL. While it can utilize secondary forest, such habitat does not seem to be optimal. Its feeding habits are little-studied, but it probably eats a mix of plant matter (particularly fruits) and small arthropods as do its better-known relatives. It forages in typical galliform fashion, utilising its feet and bill to uncover invertebrates from forest litter. Recorded food items include insects such as Diptera, Orthoptera and Hymenoptera (e.g. carpenter ants), mollusks, isopods Camponotus, and fruits and seeds of Annonaceae, Fabaceae and Fagaceae (e.g. stone oaks, Lithocarpus). Other items found in Malay peacock-pheasant stomachs were probably not ingested deliberately; they include moss, twigs, rootlets and part of an Apocynaceae flower.

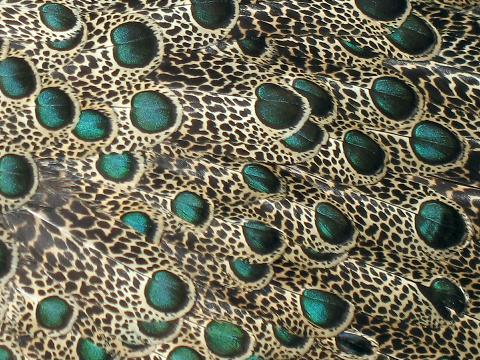
Adult male's mantle feathers with their eyespots and "salt-and-pepper" pattern

=== Reproduction ===
While captive Malay peacock-pheasants may sometimes appear to polygynous or promiscuous, not forming lasting pair bonds, this is probably atypical as peacock-pheasants are as a rule monogamous with males participating in nest defense and chick rearing. The mating season is not well resolved; recently used nests have been found in March, April and August. Breeding activity may in fact occur essentially all year round (as in many lowland rainforest birds), triggered by abundance of mast rather than by a fixed circannual rhythm. Males scrape the debris and leaf litter off their display sites in forest clearings, from where they maintain vocal contact with their mate and progeny. They adopt various highly stereotyped and ritualised postures and associated plumage displays, which reveal prominent ocelli on remiges and rectrices. These behaviors are likewise used in self-defense. When utilised in pair-bonding behavior copulation may occur subsequent to lateral displays. Anterior displays are also performed which may include curious clicking and vibrating pulsations of feather quills created via stridulation.

Aviculturists report that the males' contribution to reproduction ends after copulation. This is not always the case in instances where pairs are maintained in mixed species enclosures and encouraged to nest naturally. The nest is somewhat vestigial, consisting of twigs and large leaves scraped together on low-lying firm ground, be it on a termite mound a short distance above the forest floor, or the forest floor itself. P. malacense is one of the few pheasants known with certainty to have a one-egg clutch. Incubation takes probably 22–23 days. The species is not infrequently bred in zoos.

=== Status and conservation ===
Due to ongoing habitat loss, small population size and limited range, the Malayan peacock-pheasant is evaluated as endangered on the IUCN Red List of Threatened Species. Its numbers have declined about two-thirds in the last decade or so, and that this trend is expected to last for another decade at least. It is listed on CITES Appendix II.

Deforestation is the main threat for this species, and has rendered more than half of the places where it was found in the 1970s unsuitable for it. The available habitat has even declined by over three-quarters during that time, indicating that the population – estimated at about 8,000 adults as of 2008 – is close to the maximum possible, as less and less suitable forest is not inhabited by P. malacense. It used to be hunted for food or as a trophy, but compared to deforestation these threats are nearly insignificant nowadays.

While a small amount of selective logging is tolerated by this bird, it depends on sufficient primary forest to persist. Most Malay peacock-pheasants today live in protected areas in Malaysia, namely Taman Negara National Park and Krau Wildlife Reserve in Pahang, and perhaps Sungkai Sambar Deer and Pheasant Wildlife Reserve in Perak and Sungai Dusun Wildlife Reserve in Selangor. There are also a few reports from less strictly-protected areas, such as Pasoh Forest Reserve in Negeri Sembilan. In areas where they receive protection and where suitable habitat is plentiful, the Malay peacock-pheasant can be fairly common, and thus become a flagship species for ecotourism and other forms of sustainable development. A zoo population exists, numbering 189 birds in 35 sites in 1993. Its studbook is maintained by the New York Zoological Society and Wildlife Conservation International. The Department of Wildlife and National Parks of Malaysia is preparing a captive breeding program to bolster the population in reserves and prevent inbreeding depression by release of captive-bred birds.
