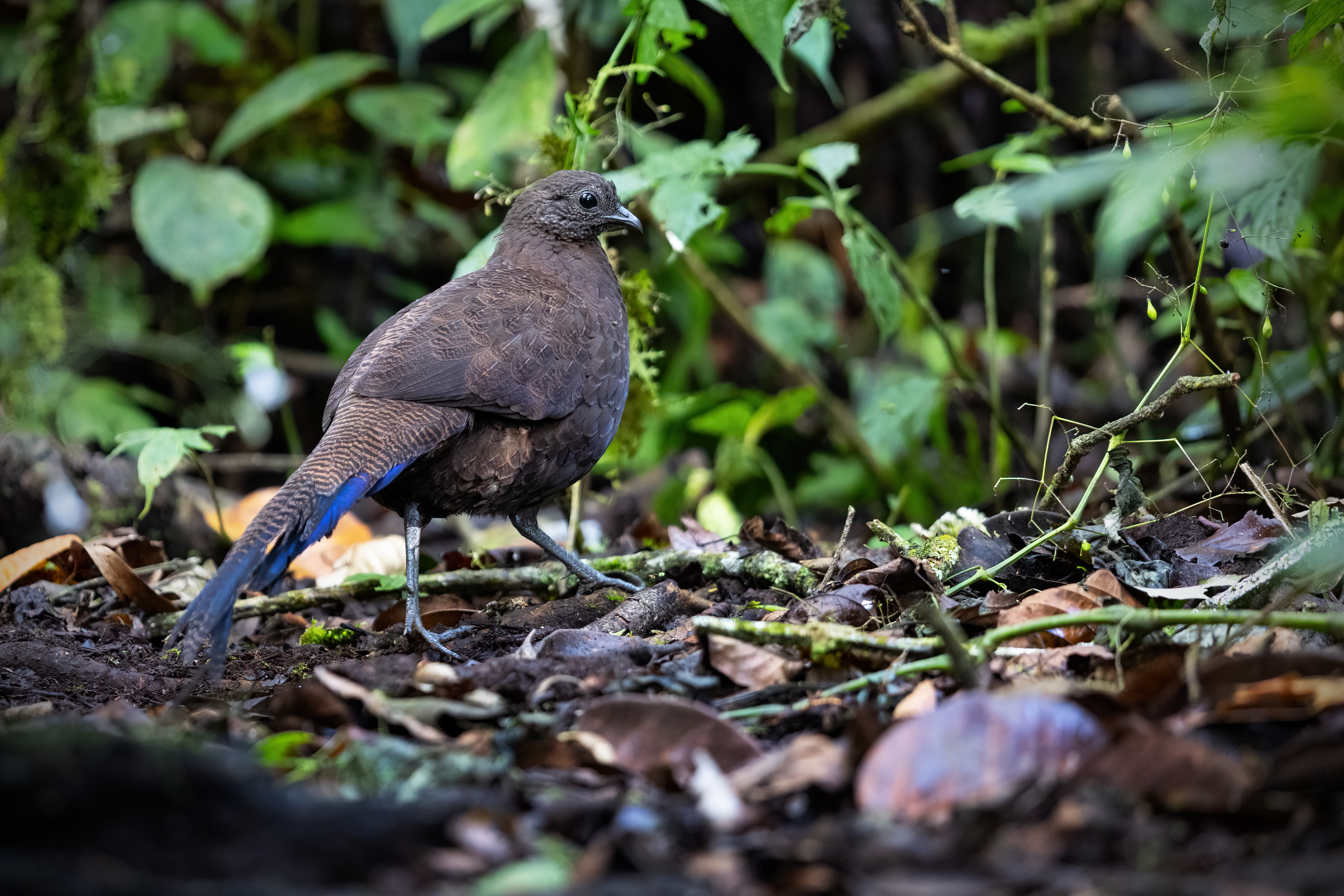

Conservation status
- Least Concern (IUCN 3.1)

Scientific classification
- Kingdom: Animalia
- Phylum: Chordata
- Class: Aves
- Order: Galliformes
- Family: Phasianidae
- Genus: Polyplectron
- Species: P. chalcurum

Binomial name
- Polyplectron chalcurum Lesson, 1831

Subspecies
- P. c. chalcurum Lesson, 1831 Southern bronze-tailed peacock-pheasant; P. c. scutulatum Hoogerwerf, 1941 Northern bronze-tailed peacock-pheasant

Synonyms
- Chalcurus chalcurus

= Sumatran peacock-pheasant =

Species of bird

The Sumatran peacock-pheasant (Polyplectron chalcurum) is also known as the bronze-tailed peacock-pheasant. It is an Indonesian bird.

== Description ==
The Sumatran peacock-pheasant is a small, up to 56 cm long, dark brown pheasant with dark grey legs, rather small head and long, narrow tail of sixteen feathers. The tail feathers are chestnut brown with metallic purplish bars near tips. Both sexes are similar. The male has longer tail, two spurs on legs and yellow iris while the unspurred female's is dark brown.

== Taxonomy and evolution ==
The Sumatran peacock-pheasant belongs to the family Phasianidae and the genus Polyplectron, which consists of seven peacock-pheasant species. There are two subspecies:

- P. c. chalcurum, described by Lesson in 1831
- P. c. scutulatum, described by Hoogerwerf in 1941

mtDNA cytochrome b and D-loop as well as the nuclear ovomucoid intron G data confirms that this species belongs to a clade together with the mountain peacock-pheasant, but also the mainland species Germain's peacock-pheasant and grey peacock-pheasant (Kimball et al. 2001).

The molecular data suggests - though not with high confidence - that this species diverged relatively recently from ancestral grey peacock-pheasants. This is quite spurious, since biogeography, its peculiarly derived plumage, and the fact that it is an insular mountain endemic indicate it is derived from a comparatively small founder population; this would confound molecular analyses. What seems clear is that the present species evolved from mainland Southeast Asian stock, probably during the Late Pliocene to Early Pleistocene (3.6-1 mya). The loss of ocelli thus is, contrary to long-held opinion, an autapomorphy, and the southern species of this clade - formerly separated in the genus Chalcurus - are probably not each other's closest relatives.

== Distribution and habitat ==
An Indonesian endemic, the Sumatran peacock-pheasant inhabits to mountain forests of west Sumatra.

== Behaviour ==
As with other member in the genus, this elusive bird is shy and very wary. But unlike other peacock-pheasants, it has no ocelli.

== Conservation ==
The Sumatran peacock-pheasant is evaluated as Least Concern on the IUCN Red List of Threatened Species.
