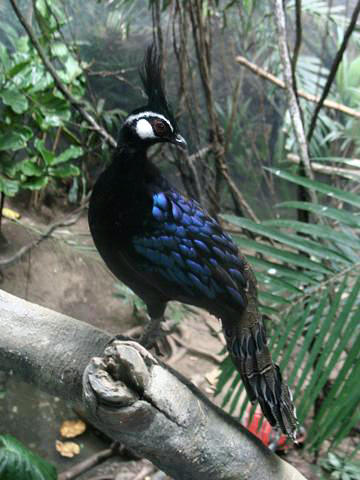
- male Palawan peacock-pheasant Polyplectron napoleonis

Scientific classification
- Kingdom: Animalia
- Phylum: Chordata
- Class: Aves
- Order: Galliformes
- Family: Phasianidae
- Subfamily: Phasianinae
- Tribe: Polyplectronini; Blyth, 1852
- Genus: Polyplectron; Temminck, 1807

Type species
- Polyplectron chinquis = Pavo bicalcaratus Temminck, 1823

Synonyms
- Polyplectrum (lapsus)

= Peacock-pheasant =

Peacock-pheasants

Genus of birds

The peacock-pheasants are a bird genus, Polyplectron, of the family Phasianidae, consisting of eight species. They are colored inconspicuously, relying heavily on crypsis to avoid detection. When threatened, peacock-pheasants will alter their shapes using specialised plumage that when expanded reveals numerous iridescent orbs. The birds also vibrate their plume quills further accentuating their aposematism. Peacock-pheasants exhibit well developed metatarsal spurs. Older individuals may have multiple spurs on each leg. These kicking thorns are used in self-defense.

== Taxonomy ==
The genus Polyplectron was introduced in 1807 by the Dutch zoologist Coenraad Jacob Temminck. The name combines the Ancient Greek polus meaning "many" with plēktron meaning "cock's spur". The type species is the grey peacock-pheasant.

The systematics of the genus are somewhat unclear. Molecular research has revealed that peacock-pheasants are not genetically related to pheasants and only distantly to peafowl. Their closest allies are the Asiatic spurfowl and the crimson-headed partridge, endemic to Borneo. These three genera share the curious tendency for multiple metatarsal spurs. Though they are somewhat divergent morphologically, their skeletons are nearly identical.

The species of Polyplectron diverged at some time between, roughly, the Early Pliocene and the Middle Pleistocene, or 5–1 million years ago. Polyplectron malacense and P. schleiermacheri form a basal radiation around the southern South China Sea together with P. napoleonis, as is confirmed by comparison of biogeography and mtDNA cytochrome b and D-loop as well as the nuclear ovomucoid intron G.

The relationships of the other forms are more poorly understood. P. germaini and P. bicalcaratum are similar in morphology and are nearly parapatric; the molecular data suggests that the latter is a symplesiomorphy. It would appear that P. germaini and P. katsumatae represent an early offshoot of the aforementioned basal radiation. The two montane-adapted species P. chalcurum and P. inopinatum are not derived from a single isolation event, and appear to have acquired more subdued coloration independently. A trend in this genus to lose—not gain—pronounced sexual dimorphism is better supported by biogeographical and molecular data than the alternate scenario.

In 2010 the IOC World Bird List listed the Hainan peacock-pheasant as a species. Following Jean Théodore Delacour, this species has historically been listed as a subspecies of P. bicalcaratum. Prior to reclassification by Delacour, the Hainan peacock-pheasant has been considered a distinct species by several ornithologists. Indeed, when it was first described to science by Katsumata it was considered a distinct species. Prominent organizations including the World Bird List have recently concurred, and species status is currently under review by the Oriental Bird Club. It is considered of utmost importance to have the Hainan peacock-pheasant recognized as a full species due to its endangered status. The Hainan peacock-pheasant is endemic to the island of Hainan, where its population density is very low in its tropical forest habitat on the island and the wild population is declining, making it now severely endangered and among the rarest species in the order Galliformes in China.

== Species ==
Image	Name	Common name	Distribution
	Polyplectron napoleonis – formerly P. emphanum	Palawan peacock-pheasant	Philippines
	Polyplectron malacense	Malayan peacock-pheasant	Malay Peninsula from the Isthmus of Kra region southwards
	Polyplectron schleiermacheri	Bornean peacock-pheasant	Borneo
	Polyplectron germaini	Germain's peacock-pheasant	mid-southern Vietnam and far eastern Cambodia
	Polyplectron bicalcaratum	Grey peacock-pheasant	Bangladesh, Northeast India and Southeast Asia
	Polyplectron katsumatae – split from P. bicalcaratum	Hainan peacock-pheasant	Hainan, China
	Polyplectron chalcurum	Bronze-tailed peacock-pheasant	Indonesia
	Polyplectron inopinatum	Mountain peacock-pheasant	Malaysia
