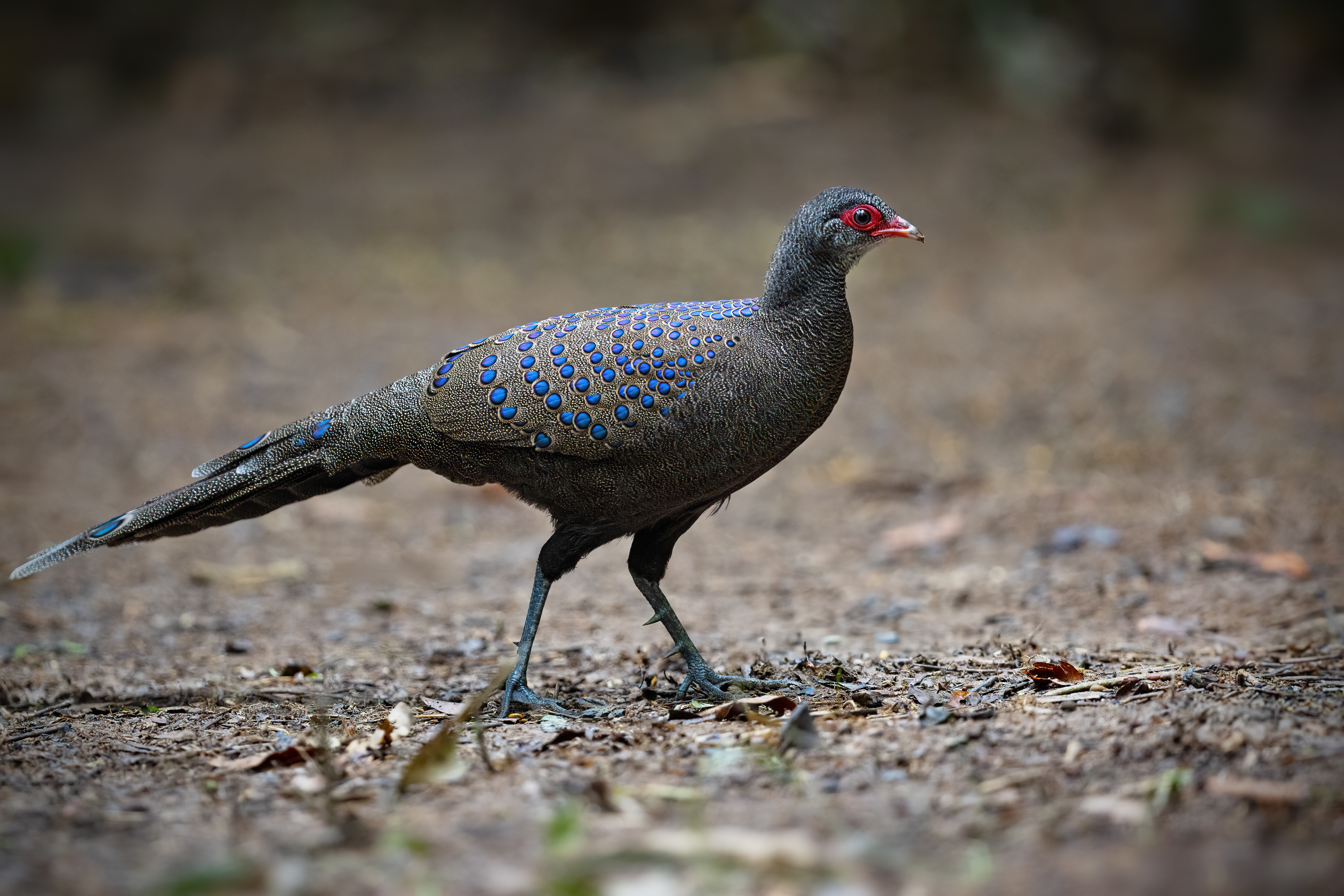
- Male
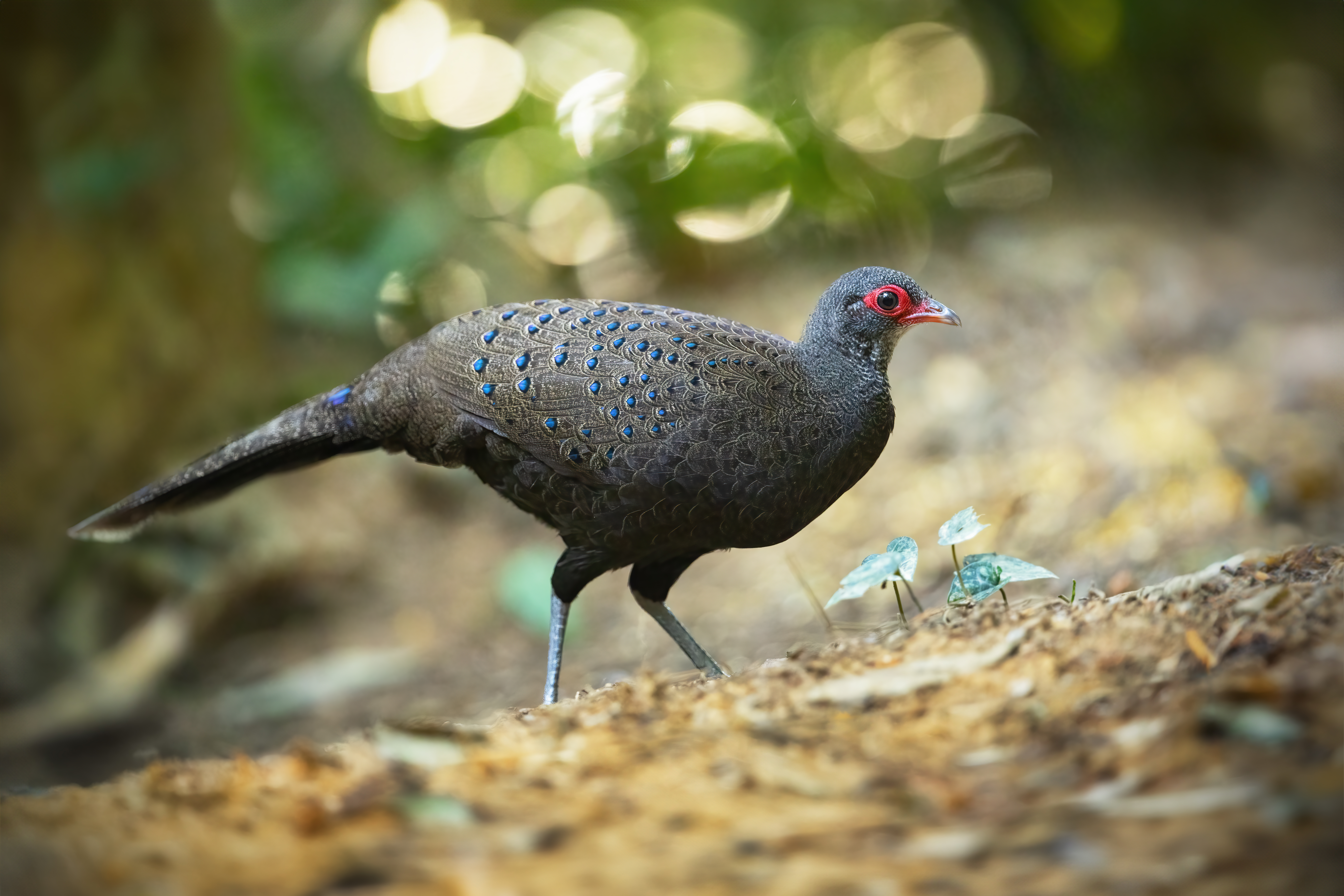
- Female; Both photographed at Cát Tiên National Park

Conservation status
- Vulnerable (IUCN 3.1)
- CITES Appendix II

Scientific classification
- Kingdom: Animalia
- Phylum: Chordata
- Class: Aves
- Order: Galliformes
- Family: Phasianidae
- Genus: Polyplectron
- Species: P. germaini

Binomial name
- Polyplectron germaini Elliot, 1866

= Germain's peacock-pheasant =

Species of bird

The Germain's peacock-pheasant (Polyplectron germaini) is a pheasant in the family Phasianidae endemic to Indochina. The name commemorates the French colonial army's veterinary surgeon Louis Rodolphe Germain.

== Description ==
The bird is a medium-sized, approximately 60 centimetres (24 in) long, brownish dark pheasant with finely spotted buff, short crest, bare red facial skin, brown iris and purplish-blue ocelli on upperbody plumage and half of its tail of twenty feathers. Both sexes are similar. The female has eighteen tail feathers and is smaller than the male.

== Taxonomy ==
The phylogeny of this species is somewhat enigmatic. mtDNA cytochrome b and D-loop as well as the nuclear ovomucoid intron G data confirms that it belongs to a clade together with the grey peacock-pheasant, but also the "brown" southernly species bronze-tailed peacock-pheasant and mountain peacock-pheasant. Biogeography suggests that it may indeed be the most ancient form in its clade, speciating parapatrically or peripatrically in Cochinchina (Kimball et al. 2001). This probably took place in the Late Pliocene, roughly 4-3 mya.

== Distribution and habitat ==
The Germain's peacock-pheasant is endemic to southern Indochina. It is found in the seasonal tropical forests of mid-southern Vietnam and far eastern Cambodia; it can be found readily in Cat Tien National Park. The female usually lays two creamy-white eggs.

== Status and conservation ==
Due to ongoing habitat loss and limited range, the Germain's peacock-pheasant is evaluated as Vulnerable on the IUCN Red List of Threatened Species. It is listed on Appendix II of CITES.
