= SSI protease inhibitor =

SSI
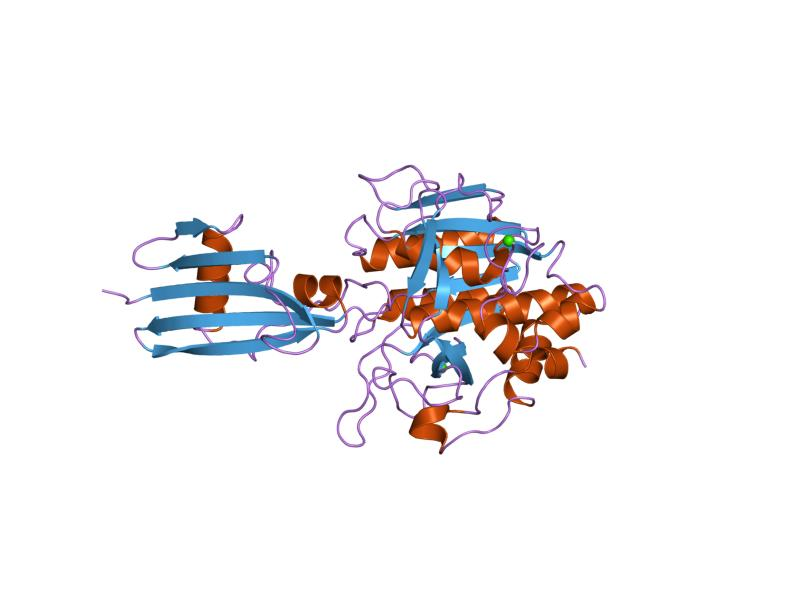
- Molecular recognition at the active site of subtilisin BPN': crystallographic studies using genetically engineered protease inhibitor SSI (Streptomyces subtilisin inhibitor)

Identifiers
- Symbol: SSI
- Pfam: PF00720
- InterPro: IPR000691
- PROSITE: PDOC00766
- MEROPS: I16
- SCOP2: 2sic / SCOPe / SUPFAM
Available protein structures:
- PDB: IPR000691 PF00720 (ECOD; PDBsum)
- AlphaFold: IPR000691; PF00720

In molecular biology the protein SSI is a Subtilisin inhibitor-like which stands for Streptomyces subtilisin inhibitor. This is a protease inhibitor. These are often synthesised as part of a larger precursor protein, either as a prepropeptide. The function of this protein domain is to prevent access of the substrate to the active site. It is found only in bacteria.

== Function ==
SSI is a protease inhibitor, it prevents enzymes from acting on a substrate. Some SSI's also inhibit trypsin, chymotrypsin and griselysin. Commercially, SSI's have huge potential in the commercial market, they help stabilise proteases in products such as laundry detergents to prevent autolysis of biological washing powders. This means that the enzymes in the washing powder are kept in optimum performance.

== Structure ==
SSI is a homodimer, in other words, it is made of two subunits which are exactly the same as each other. Each monomer contains 2 antiparallel beta-sheets and 2 short alpha-helices. Protease binding induces the widening of a channel-like structure, in which hydrophobic side-chains are sandwiched between 2 lobes.

Studies have shown that the loss of the C-terminal domain reduces the inhibitory effect of the proteins. This implies that the C-terminal domain is responsible for maintaining the correct 3D fold.

Structural similarities between the primary and secondary contact loops of SSI, and the ovomucoid and pancreatic secretory trypsin inhibitor family suggest evolution of the 2 families from a common ancestor.
