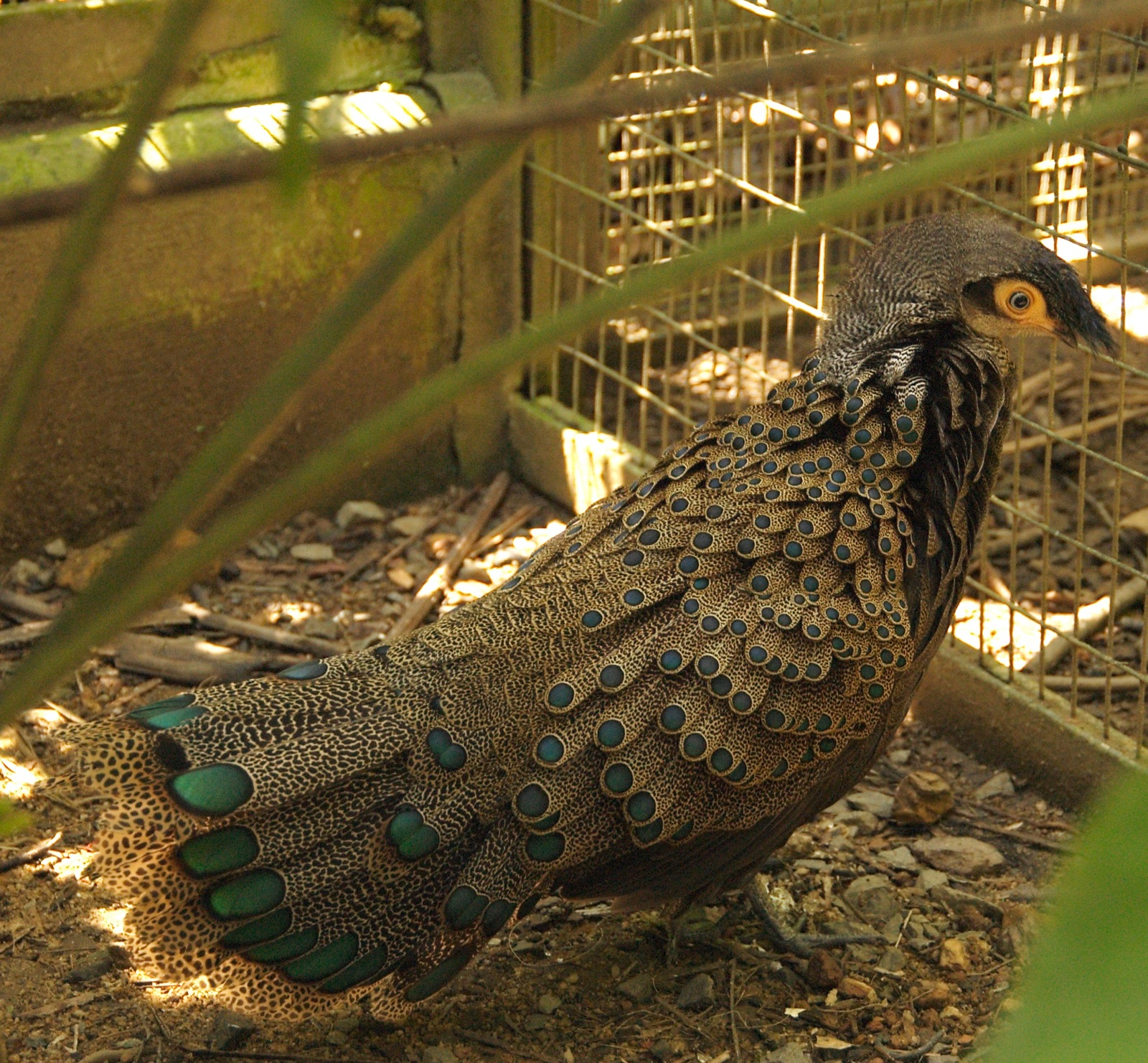

Conservation status
- Endangered (IUCN 3.1)
- CITES Appendix II

Scientific classification
- Kingdom: Animalia
- Phylum: Chordata
- Class: Aves
- Order: Galliformes
- Family: Phasianidae
- Genus: Polyplectron
- Species: P. schleiermacheri

Binomial name
- Polyplectron schleiermacheri Brüggemann, 1877

Synonyms
- Polyplectron malacense schleiermacheri

= Bornean peacock-pheasant =

Species of bird

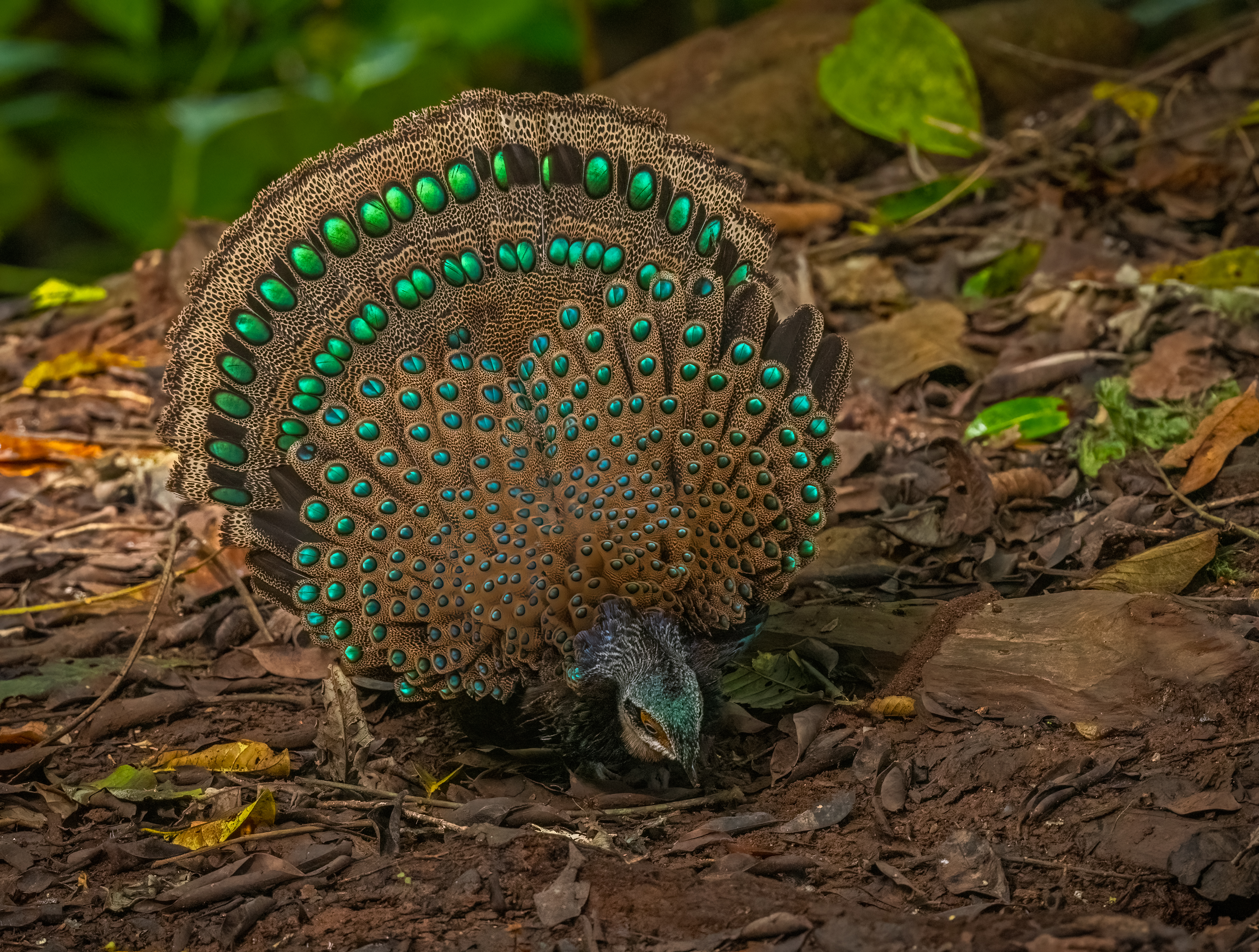
Bornean peacock-pheasant in display mode

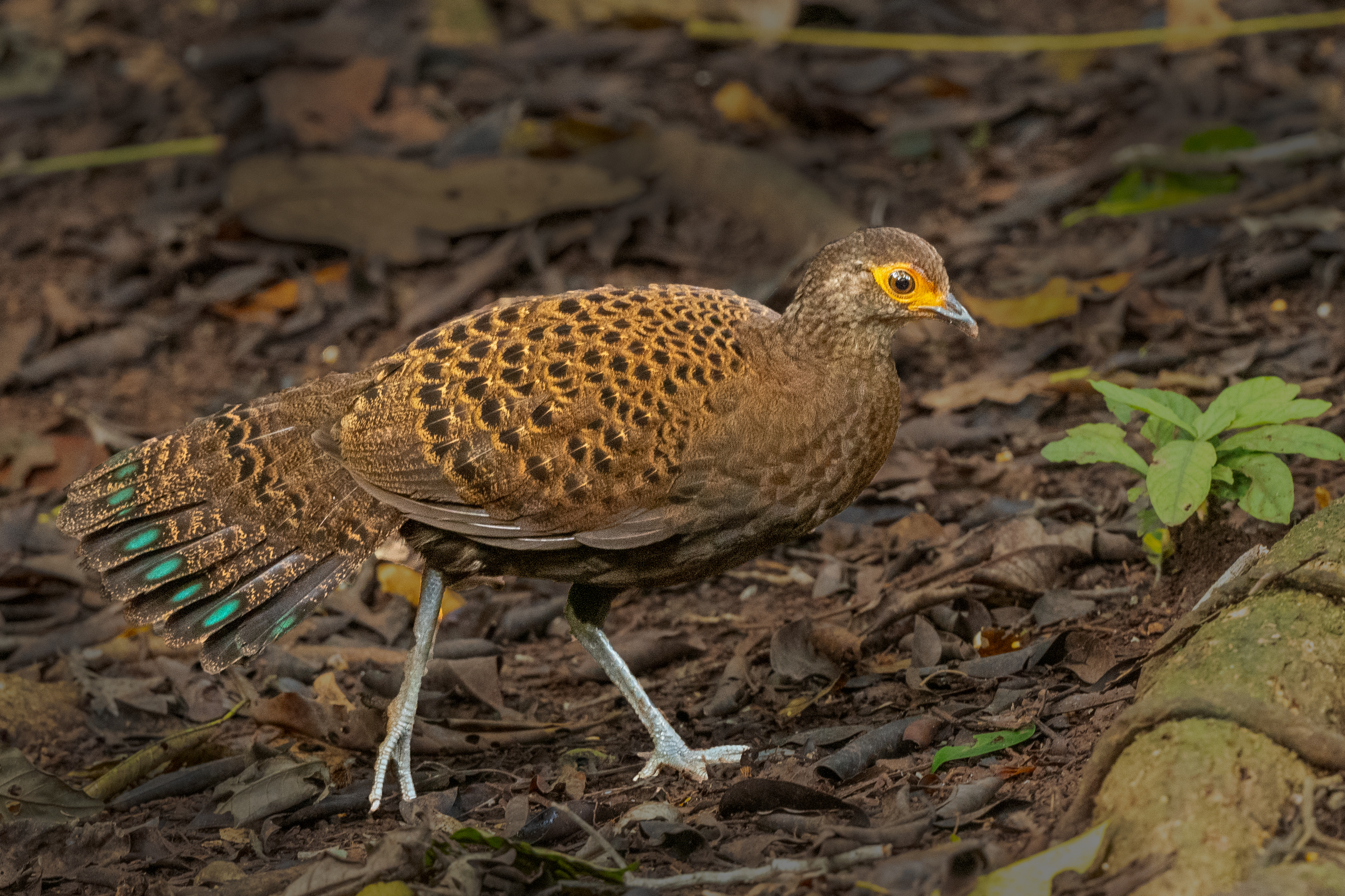
Bornean peacock-pheasant Female Sabah Malaysia (Borneo)

The Bornean peacock-pheasant (Polyplectron schleiermacheri) is a medium-sized pheasant. It is probably the rarest and certainly the least known of all peacock-pheasants. This elusive bird is endemic to lowland forests of Borneo.

== Description ==
The pheasant is up to 50 cm long, rufous brown and black spotted, with an elongated crest and nape feathers, black below and bare red skin around bluish iris eye. The breast sides are metallic blue-green, bordering the white throat and central upper breast. Its twenty-two tail feathers are decorated with large blue-green ocelli, which may be spread fan-like in display. The female is smaller and duller brown than the male. It has a brown iris and no spurs on its feet.

== Distribution ==
Endemic to Borneo, where it has been observed throughout the country, although its exact distribution is unknown. Central Kalimantan is home to a more fragmented population (O'Brien & Kinnaird 1997).

== Habitat ==
It inhabits lowland forests along the upper reaches of rivers, especially between 100 and 500 m above sea level, and appears to be absent from humid and swampy forests (O'Brien & Kinnaird 1997).

== Diet ==
Its diet consists of fruits, seeds, and invertebrates, and is thought to be the source of seasonal movements linked to food availability (O'Brien & Kinnaird 1997).

== Behavior ==
Non-social behavior This is a very shy species, taking to the vegetation cover at the slightest warning, running rather than flying. Difficult to observe, it remains one of the least understood peacock-pheasant species. Its presence is particularly noticeable during the breeding season, due to the calls uttered by the males and the arenas they maintain, cleared of leaves, for courtship (Hennache & Ottaviani 2006).

Social behavior

It is currently unknown, but they are likely solitary birds. Observations made in captivity are contradictory. According to Seitre (2004), who visited the Rezit Sozer breeding farm in Java, it is extremely difficult to keep both members of a pair together outside the breeding season. On the other hand, Kuah (in litt.) breeds Bornean spur-tails in pairs, like other species, and even in trios, without encountering major problems, except for constant infertility when the partners do not get along. If they do not fight, they ignore each other perfectly!

Courtship Display

The only observation of courtship displays was made by Denton (1978) and reported by Johnsgard (1999).

== Taxonomy ==
The first specimens of the Bornean peacock-pheasant were collected by G. Fischer in Muara Teweh (southeast Borneo), skinned and sent to the Darmstadt Museum in Germany. They were scientifically named "Polyplectron schleiermacheri" by Brüggeman in 1877 in honor of Schleiermacher, then director of the museum (Hennache & Ottaviani 2006).

Together with the phenotypically similar Malayan peacock-pheasant and Palawan peacock-pheasant it represents a basal group in its genus; their radiation probably took place during the Pliocene Being very poorly known, the Bornean peacock-pheasant was long considered to be a subspecies of the Malayan peacock-pheasant, but the two species are well-isolated geographically. The highly specialised anterior breast and upper neck plumage of male Bornean peacock-pheasant males are quite distinctive. Females of the two species are more difficult to distinguish. The rectrices of the Bornean species are morphologically and patterned intermediate between Palawan and Malayan peacock-pheasants.

== Status and conservation ==
Because of ongoing habitat loss, small population size, and limited range, the Bornean peacock-pheasant is evaluated as Endangered on the IUCN Red List of Threatened Species. It is listed on Appendix II of CITES.
