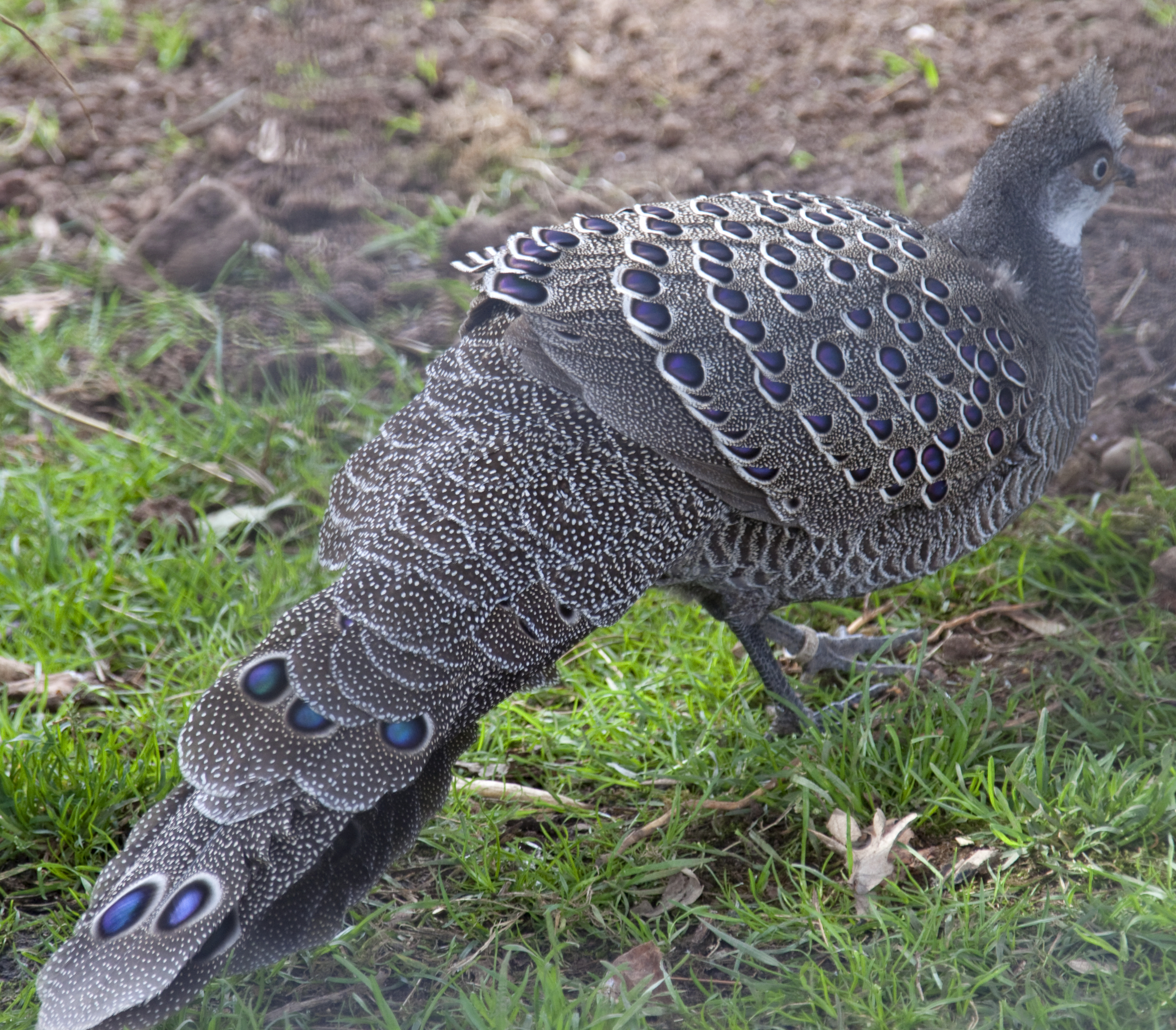
- At Birmingham Nature Centre, England

Conservation status
- Least Concern (IUCN 3.1)
- CITES Appendix II (CITES)

Scientific classification
- Kingdom: Animalia
- Phylum: Chordata
- Class: Aves
- Order: Galliformes
- Family: Phasianidae
- Genus: Polyplectron
- Species: P. bicalcaratum

Binomial name
- Polyplectron bicalcaratum (Linnaeus, 1758)

Synonyms
- Pavo bicalcaratus Linnaeus, 1758; Polyplectron chinquis Temminck, 1815

= Grey peacock-pheasant =

Species of bird

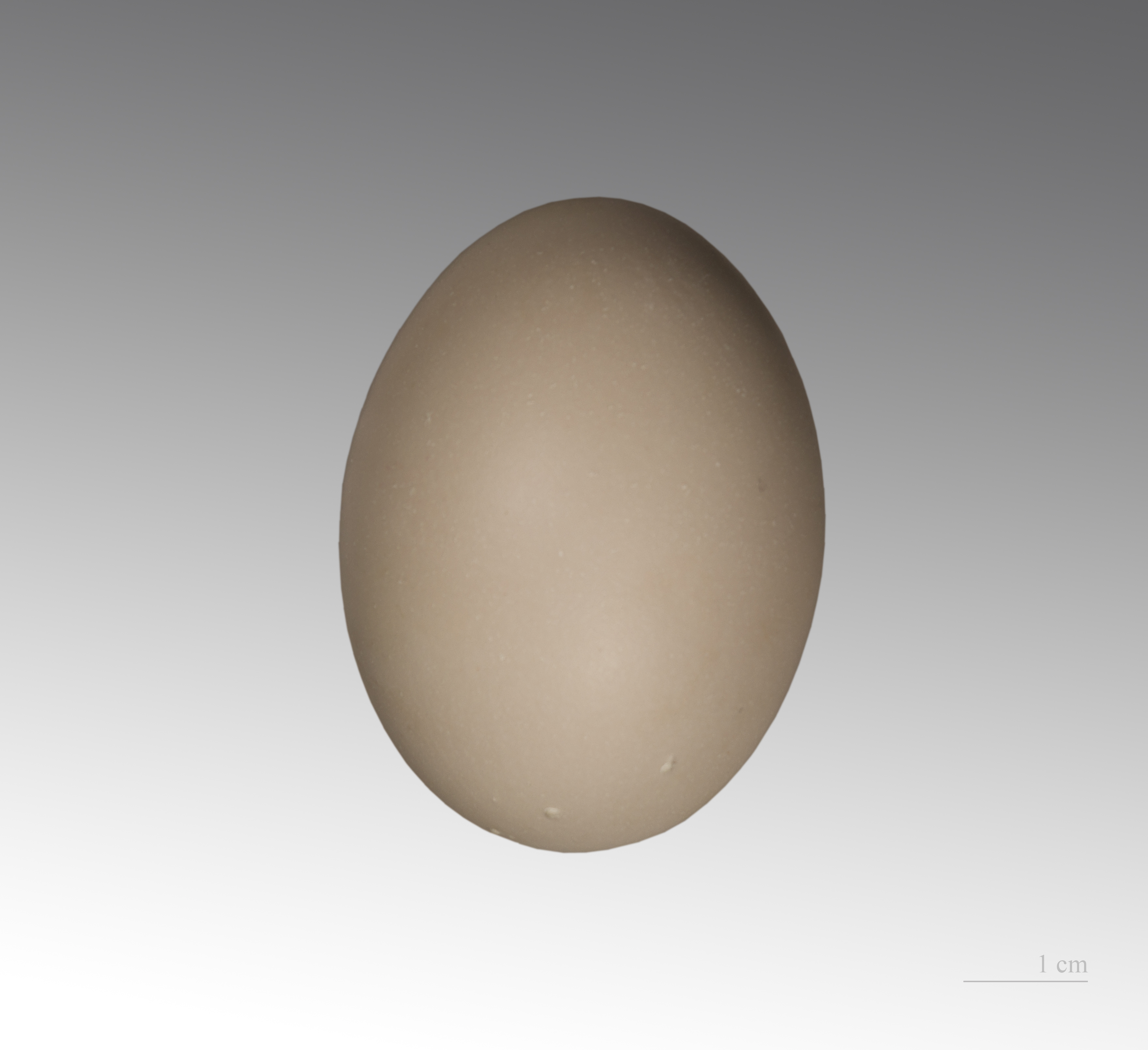
Polyplectron bicalcaratum

The grey peacock-pheasant (Polyplectron bicalcaratum), also known as Burmese peacock-pheasant, is a large Asian member of the order Galliformes.

== Taxonomy ==
In 1747 the English naturalist George Edwards included an illustration and a description of the grey peacock-pheasant in the second volume of his A Natural History of Uncommon Birds. He used the English name "The Peacock Pheasant from China". Edwards based his hand-coloured etching on a live bird which was given to Robert Walpole, 1st Earl of Orford. When in 1758 the Swedish naturalist Carl Linnaeus updated his Systema Naturae for the tenth edition, he placed the grey peacock-pheasant with the Indian peafowl in the genus Pavo. Linnaeus included a brief description, coined the binomial name Pavo bicalcaratum and cited Edwards' work. The grey peacock-pheasant is now placed in the genus Polyplectron that was introduced in 1807 by the Dutch zoologist Coenraad Jacob Temminck. The genus name Polyplectron combines the Ancient Greek polus meaning "many" with plēktron meaning "cock's spur". The specific epithet bicalcaratum combines the Latin bi meaning "two" with calcar, calcaris meaning "spur".

Although several subspecies have been described, none are currently recognised in the list of world birds maintained by Frank Gill, Pamela Rasmussen and David Donsker on behalf of the International Ornithological Committee (IOC).

Other subspecies have been described in the past, but these are not now recognised:

- P. b. ghigii Delacour & Jabouille, 1924 – Ghigi's grey peacock-pheasant
- P. b. bailyi Lowe, 1925 – Lowe's grey peacock-pheasant (disputed)
- P. b. bakeri Lowe, 1925 – Northern grey peacock-pheasant

One previous subspecies, the Hainan peacock-pheasant (P. b. katsumatae), is now recognised as a separate species by the IOC.

Lowe's grey peacock-pheasant was described from a captive bird of unknown provenance. Similar examples have turned up on occasion, but the validity and – if distinct – home range of this taxon remains unknown. It was theorized to inhabit western Assam or the eastern Himalayas, but this is based on conjecture.

The phylogeny of this species is fairly enigmatic. mtDNA cytochrome b and D-loop as well as the nuclear ovomucoid intron G sequence data confirms that it belongs to a largely Continental Asian clade together with Germain's peacock-pheasant (P. germaini), but also the "brown" southern species bronze-tailed peacock-pheasant (P. chalcurum) and mountain peacock-pheasant (P. inopinatum).

The ovomucin sequence seems to have evolved convergently or with a decreased mutational rate on the grey and the bronze-tailed peacock-pheasant. Though they are quite similar on the molecular level, the distance and interspersed populations of their closest relatives argue against a much more recently shared common ancestry between them versus the other two "northern" peacock-pheasants. Also, the cytochrome b and D-loop data does not support a closer relationship between P. bicalcaratus and P. chalcurum; overall, as it seems the four species' ancestors separated during a very short timespan.

Note however that in the absence of dedicated phylogeographic studies, the molecular data is only of limited value in this species, the most morphologically diverse and widespread peacock-pheasant: There is no data on the origin and number of specimens, but it is unlikely that more than one or two individuals – possibly of captive origin and undeterminable subspecific allocation – were sampled. All that can be reasonably assumed is that the grey peacock-pheasant evolved on mainland Southeast Asia, probably during the Late Pliocene to Early Pleistocene 3.6-1 million years ago.

== Description ==
It is a large pheasant, up to 76 cm long and greyish brown with finely spotted green eyespots, an elongated bushy crest, bare pink or yellow facial skin, white throat, and grey iris, bill and legs. The sexes are rather similar, but the female is smaller, darker and less ornamented than the male. The young resemble the female.

== Distribution and habitat ==
The grey peacock-pheasant is distributed in lowland and hill forests of Bangladesh, Northeast India and Southeast Asia, but excluding most of Indochina as well as the entire Malayan Peninsula. The diet consists mainly of seeds, termites, fruits and invertebrates. The female usually lays two eggs.

== Status and conservation ==
Widespread throughout its large range, the grey peacock-pheasant is evaluated as a Species of Least Concern on the IUCN Red List of Threatened Species. It is listed on CITES Appendix II, restricting trade in wild-caught birds to preserve its stocks.
