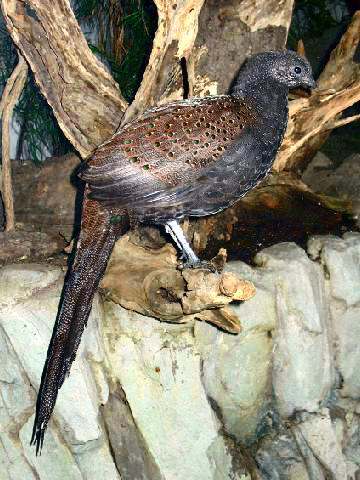

Conservation status
- Near Threatened (IUCN 3.1)

Scientific classification
- Kingdom: Animalia
- Phylum: Chordata
- Class: Aves
- Order: Galliformes
- Family: Phasianidae
- Genus: Polyplectron
- Species: P. inopinatum

Binomial name
- Polyplectron inopinatum (Rothschild, 1903)

Synonyms
- Chalcurus inopinatus Rothschild, 1903

= Mountain peacock-pheasant =

Species of bird

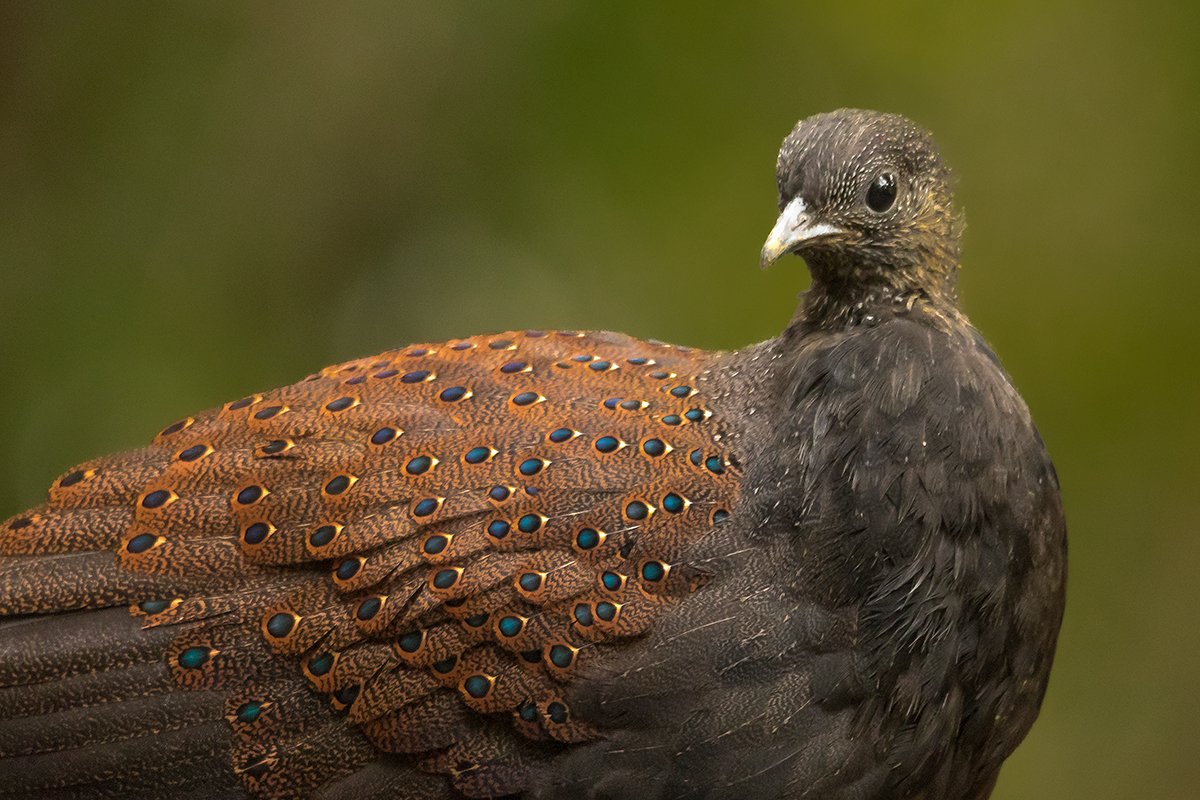
Male taken near Bukit Tinggi, Kuala Lumpur Malaysia

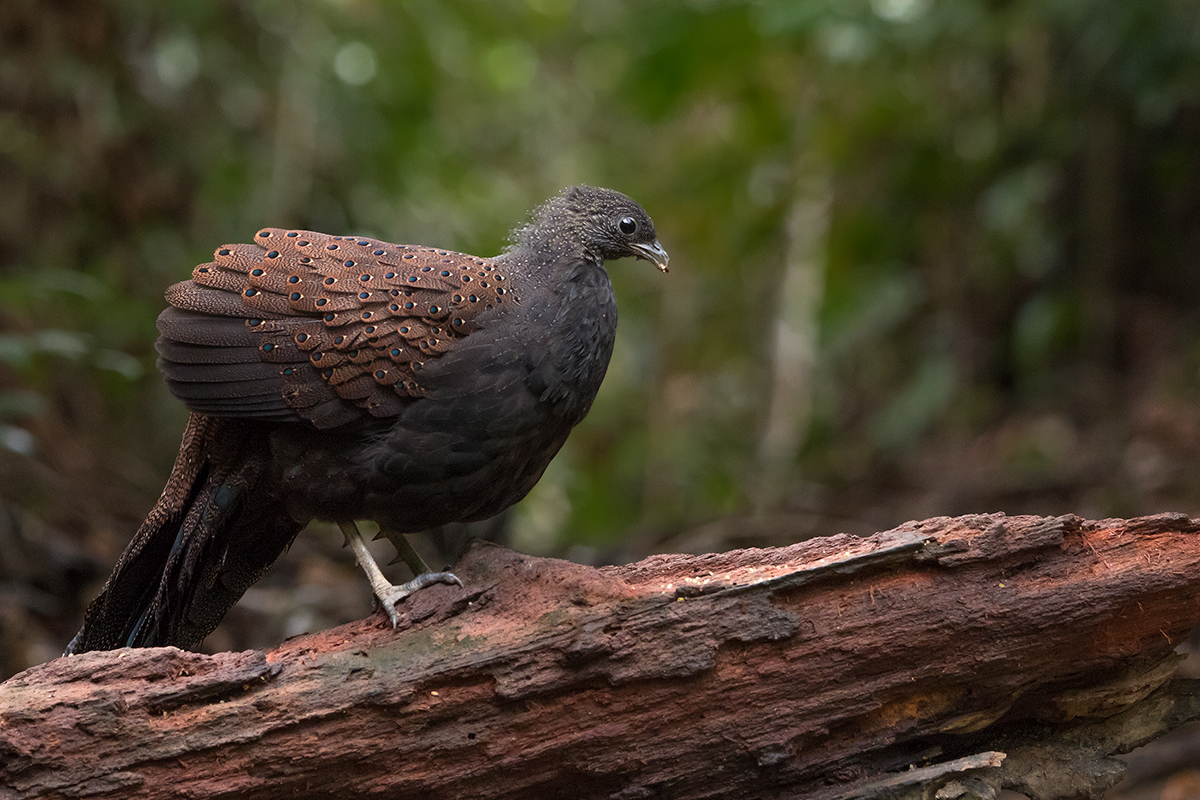
Male near Bukit Tinggi, Malaysia

The mountain peacock-pheasant (Polyplectron inopinatum), also known as Rothschild's peacock-pheasant or mirror pheasant, is a medium-sized, up to 65 cm (26 in) long, blackish brown pheasant. It is with small ocelli, long graduated tail feathers, and both sexes are similar. The male has metallic blue ocelli on upperparts, green ocelli on tail of twenty feathers and two spurs on legs. Female has black ocelli on upperparts, unspurred legs and tail of eighteen feathers. The female is smaller and duller than male.

A shy and elusive bird, the mountain peacock-pheasant is distributed and endemic to montane forests of the central Malay Peninsula. The diet consists mainly of berries, beetles and ants.

Mitochondrial DNA cytochrome b and D-loop as well as the nuclear ovomucoid intron G data confirms that this species belongs to a clade together with the bronze-tailed peacock-pheasant, Germain's peacock-pheasant and grey peacock-pheasant (Kimball et al. 2001).

The molecular data suggests - though not with high confidence - that this species diverged from mainland stock earlier than the bronze-tailed peacock-pheasant. This is quite spurious, since its biogeography and derived plumage, and the fact that it is a peninsular mountain endemic indicate it is derived from a fairly small founder population; this would confound molecular analyses. What seems clear is that the present species evolved from mainland Southeast Asian stock, probably during the Late Pliocene to Early Pleistocene (3.6-1 myr). The unique pattern of wings and tail thus is, contrary to long-held opinion, an autapomorphy, and the southern species of this clade - formerly separated in the genus Chalcurus - are probably not each other's closest relatives.

While this species has a relatively small population size and limited range, the mountain peacock-pheasant is evaluated as Near Threatened on the IUCN Red List of Threatened Species due to its range being inaccessible, and thus, protected from human encroachment. It is listed on Appendix III of CITES in Malaysia.
