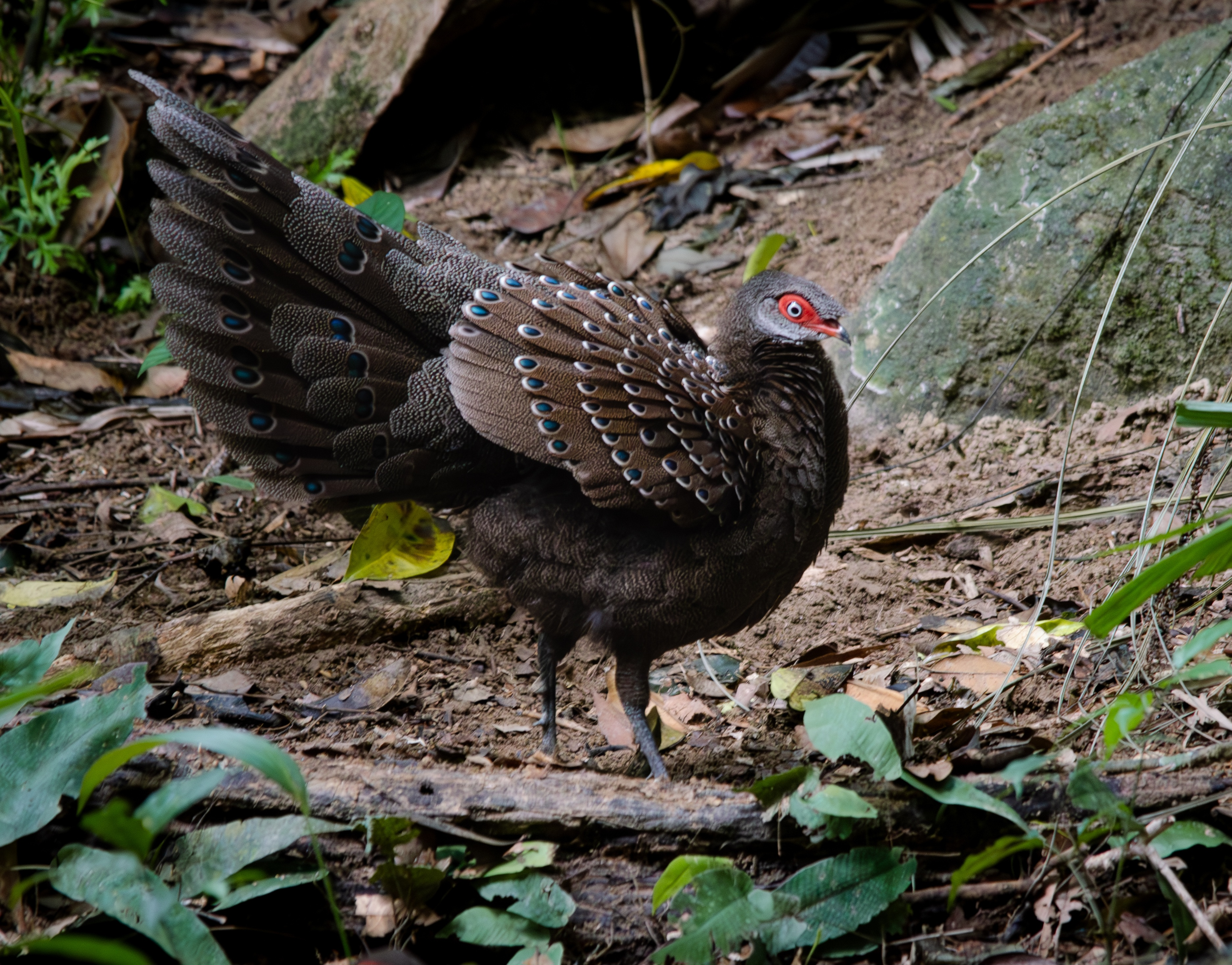
- Male
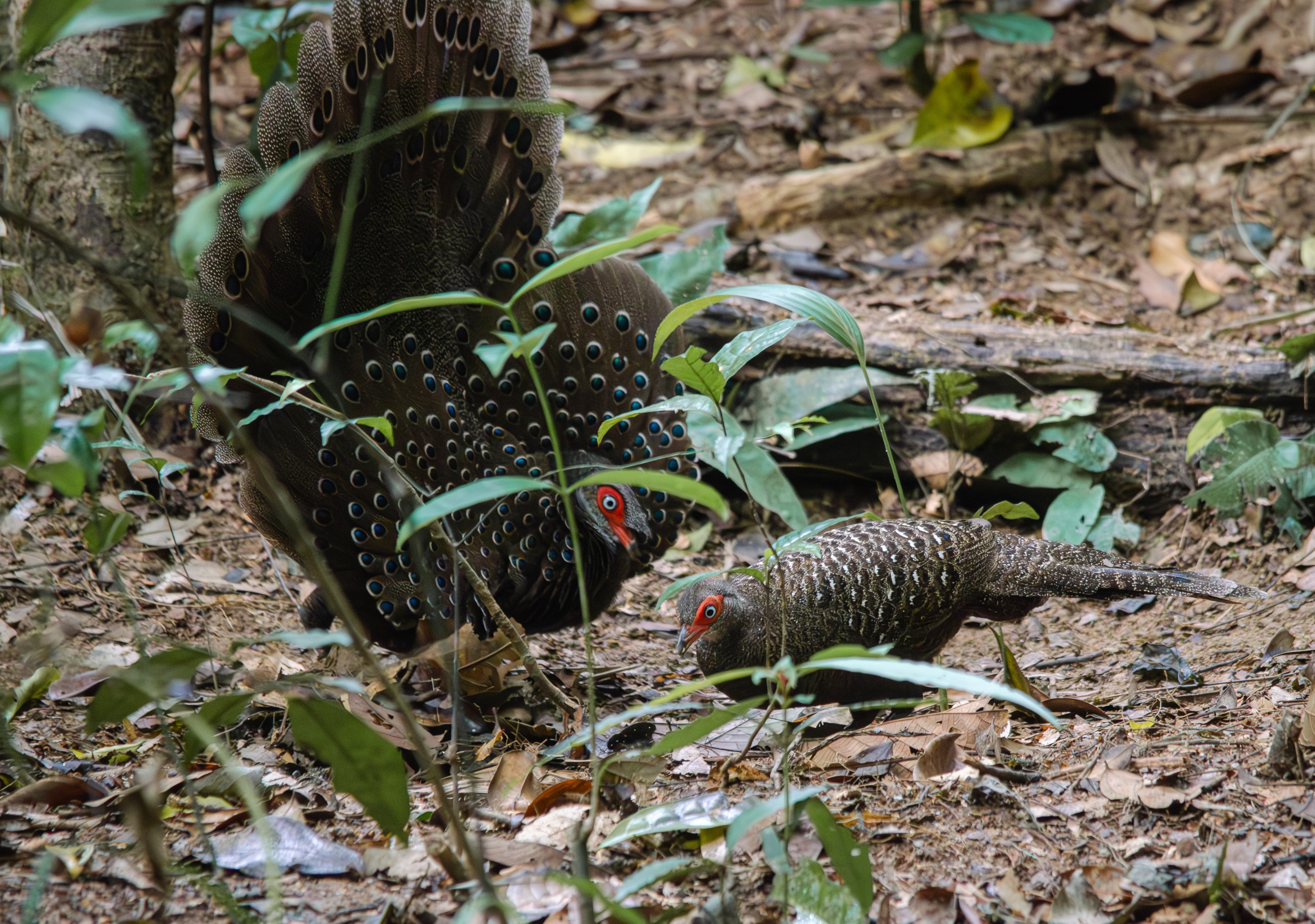
- A displaying male (left) and a female (right)

Conservation status
- Endangered (IUCN 3.1)

Scientific classification
- Kingdom: Animalia
- Phylum: Chordata
- Class: Aves
- Order: Galliformes
- Family: Phasianidae
- Genus: Polyplectron
- Species: P. katsumatae

Binomial name
- Polyplectron katsumatae Rothschild, 1906

= Hainan peacock-pheasant =

Species of bird

The Hainan peacock-pheasant (Polyplectron katsumatae) is an endangered bird that belongs to the pheasant family Phasianidae. This extremely rare species is endemic to the island of Hainan, China.

== Description ==
The bird was long considered a subspecies of grey peacock-pheasant or Polyplectron bicalcaratum. The Hainan peacock-pheasant is smaller, and it possesses a short crest and ruff (Johnsgard 1986). It has red facial skin as opposed to grey in the yellow-orange facial skin of the grey peacock-pheasant. Beebe (1922) noted various plumage differences between the two and considered them separate species.

== Taxonomy ==
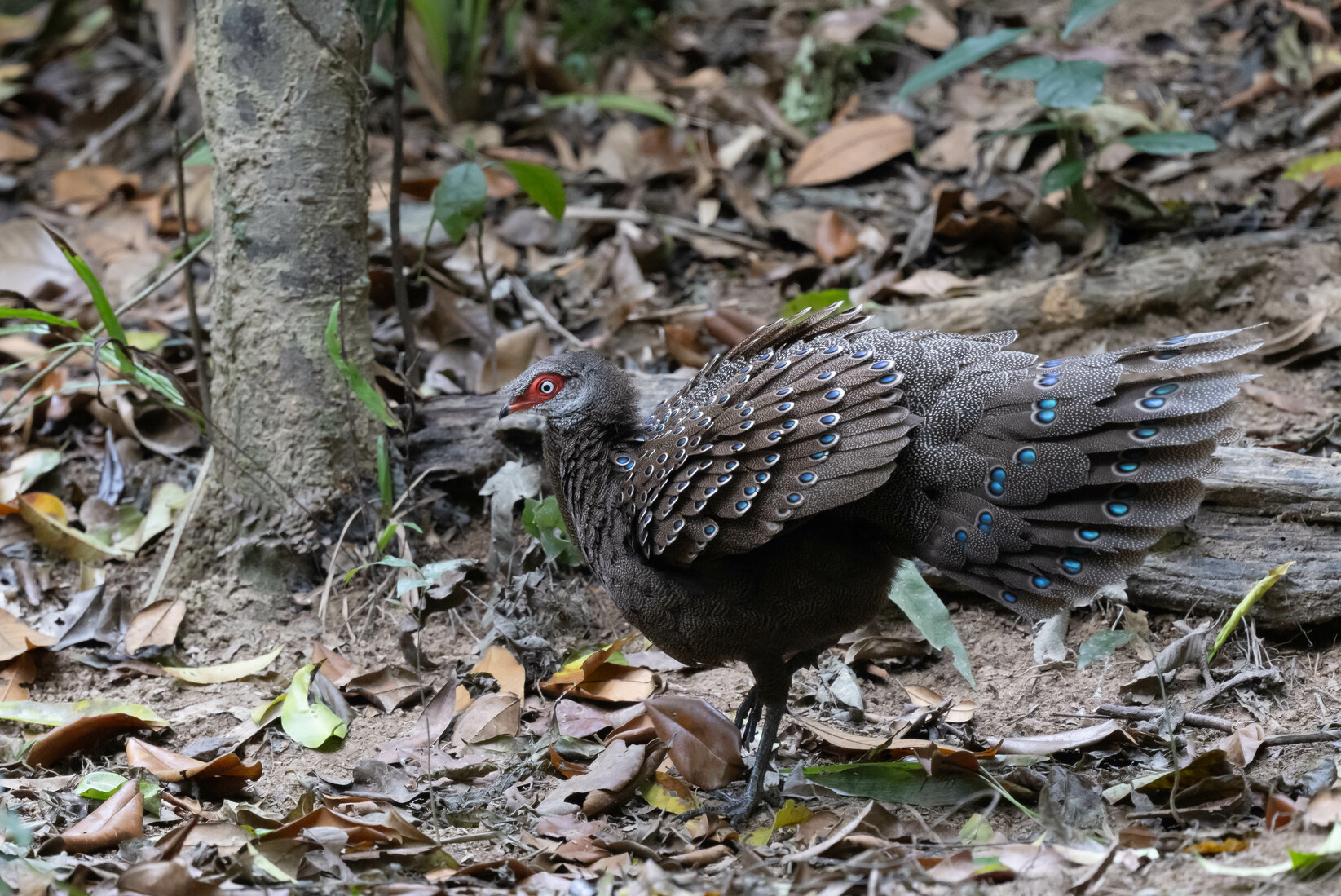

Due to lack of detailed taxonomic studies, whether it was truly a subspecies (Polyplectron bicalcaratum katsumatae) or a full species remained unclear. Scientists used molecular markers, including the complete mitochondrial cytochrome b gene and intron G of the nuclear ovomucoid gene, to reevaluate the taxonomy of the Hainan peacock-pheasant. The results showed phylogeographic monophyly and large genetic distance between the Hainan peacock-pheasant and the grey peacock-pheasant. Sequence differences corroborated the species-level distinction between these two peacock-pheasants, which were inferred to have diverged about 1.4±0.3 million years ago, near the time Hainan Island became separated from mainland China. BirdLife International has also decided to recognize the split of Polyplectron katsumatae from Polyplectron bicalcaratum.

== Conservation status ==
Due to a very low population density in tropical forest and declining population, it is now becoming severely endangered and should be regarded as the rarest species in the order Galliformes in China. Taking more conservation action immediately to protect this endangered island endemic is imperative.

== See also ==
- List of endangered and protected species of China
