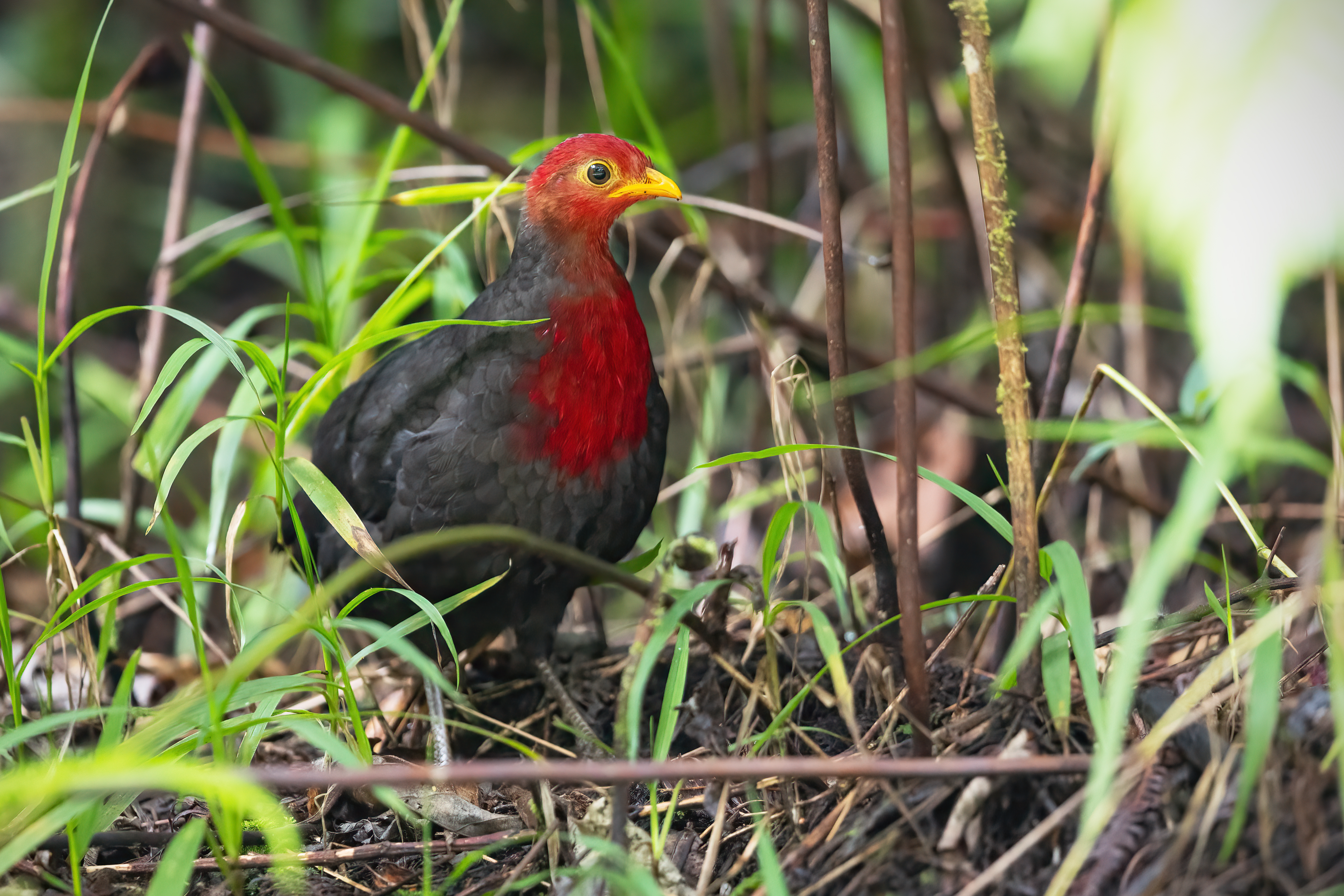
- Male

Conservation status
- Least Concern (IUCN 3.1)

Scientific classification
- Kingdom: Animalia
- Phylum: Chordata
- Class: Aves
- Order: Galliformes
- Family: Phasianidae
- Subfamily: Phasianinae
- Genus: Haematortyx; Sharpe, 1879
- Species: H. sanguiniceps

Binomial name
- Haematortyx sanguiniceps Sharpe, 1879
- Range

= Crimson-headed partridge =

Species of bird

The crimson-headed partridge (Haematortyx sanguiniceps) is a species of bird in the pheasant, partridge, and francolin family Phasianidae. Described by the British ornithologist Richard Bowdler Sharpe in 1879, it is the only species in the genus Haematortyx. It is endemic to Borneo, where it inhabits lower montane forest in the northern and central parts of the island. It is mainly found at elevations of 1,000–1,700 m (3,300–5,600 ft), but can be seen as low as 185 m (607 ft) and as high as 3,050 m (10,010 ft). Adult males have a striking appearance, with a dark blackish body and crimson red heads, necks, breasts, and undertail coverts. Females have a similar pattern, but with duller brownish-black colouration, orangish-red heads and breasts, and a brownish-black bill instead of a yellowish one. Juveniles are duller and have the crimson restricted to the top of the head.

The species feeds on berries, insects, and small crustaceans. Nests of dry leaves are built in tussocks of grass or lichen, with eggs being laid from mid-January onwards. Clutches have 8–9 eggs and incubation takes 18–19 days in captivity. The crimson-headed partridge is classified as being of least concern by the International Union for Conservation of Nature due to its fairly large range, sufficiently large population, and a lack of significant population decline. It has a population of 1,000–10,000 total individuals and 670–6,700 mature birds which is thought to be declining.

== Taxonomy and systematics ==
In 1879, the British ornithologist Richard Bowdler Sharpe described the crimson-headed partridge as Haematortyx sanguiniceps on the basis of specimens from the Lawa River. It is the type species of the genus Haematortyx, which was created for it. The name of the genus is from the Ancient Greek haima, meaning "blood", and ortux, meaning "quail". The specific name sanguiniceps comes from the Modern Latin sanguis or sanguinis, meaning "blood", and -ceps, meaning "-headed". "Crimson-headed partridge" has been designated the official common name by the International Ornithologists' Union. It is also known as the crimson-headed wood partridge. It has no recognised subspecies.

The crimson-headed partridge is the only species in the genus Haematortyx, in the pheasant, partridge, and francolin family Phasianidae, a family of 185 species found in terrestrial habitats throughout the world. A 2021 phylogeny by the evolutionary biologist Rebecca Kimball and colleagues found the crimson-headed partridge to be most closely related to a clade (group of all the descendants of a common ancestor) formed by the Polyplectron peacock-pheasants and the Galloperdix spurfowl. The crimson-headed partridge is the most basal (closest to the root of the phylogenetic tree) species in the group.

== Description ==
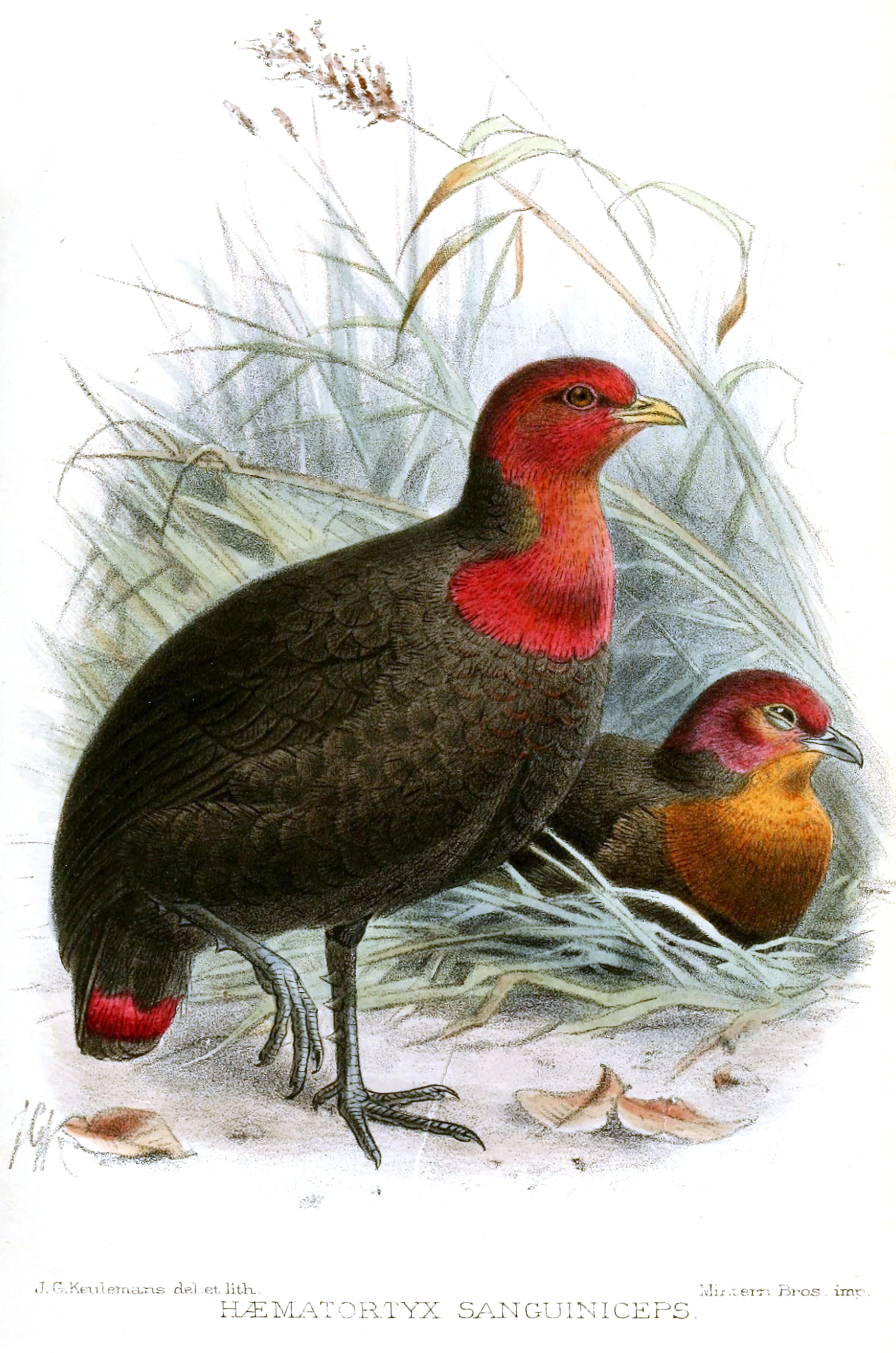
Illustration of male (front) and female (back)

A striking species of partridge, the crimson-headed partridge has an average length of around 25 cm (9.8 in) and the weight of one measured male was 330 g (12 oz). Adult males have a distinctive appearance; the heads, necks, and breasts, along with the final section of the undertail coverts, are crimson red, while the rest of the body is dark blackish. The bill is yellow to yellowish white, the iris is brown with a yellow orbital ring, and the feet are grey with one to three tarsal spurs. Adult females have a similar pattern, bur differ in their duller and browner plumage, more orangish red on the head and breast, brownish-black bill, and lack of spurs. Juveniles are duller and have the crimson restricted to the top of the head, with a brownish orange head, rust-red markings on a blackish-brown breast, and red tips to the wing coverts.

The species is unlikely to be confused with any other, with its colouration only resembling that of an immature male black partridge (Melanoperdix niger). It can be told apart from the latter by the black partridge's broader black bill.

=== Vocalisations ===
The crimson-headed partridge's song is harsh, loud, repeated call rendered as KRO-krang, kong-krrang, or whu-kweng. It is frequently given alternately by two individuals. A grating, clucking kak-kak-kak, ok-ak-ok, krak-krak or whu-keng-keng-keng-kok-kok is also made when excited.

== Distribution and habitat ==
The crimson-headed partridge is endemic to Borneo, where it inhabits mountains in the northern and central parts of the island. It is found in lower montane forest, including kerangas heath forest, alluvial forest, and poor quality forest in sandy soils. It is mainly seen at elevations of 1,000–1,700 m (3,300–5,600 ft), although it has been recorded as low as 185 m (607 ft) and as high as 3,050 m (10,010 ft).

== Behaviour and ecology ==
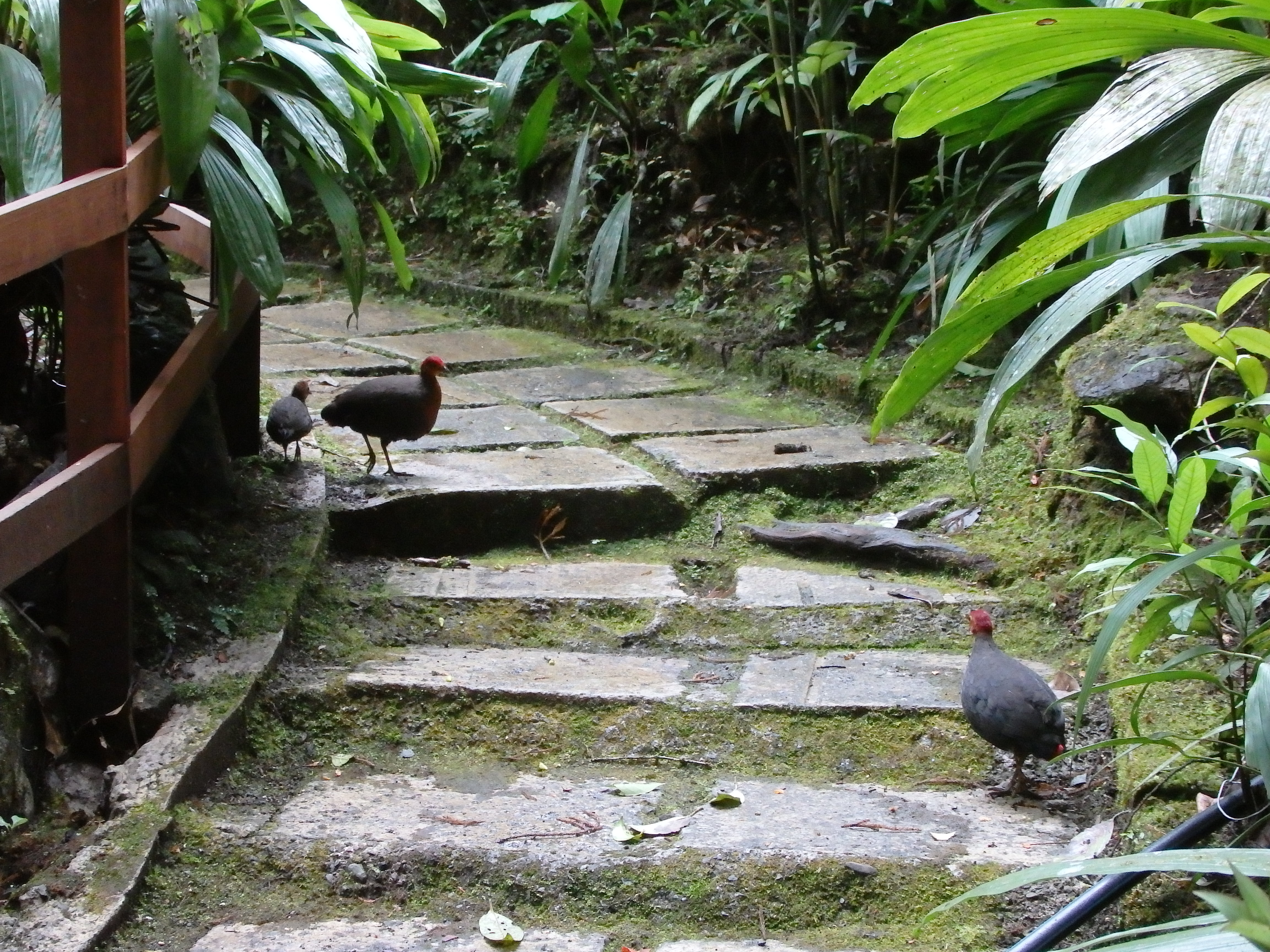
Adults with juvenile in Kinabalu Park, Malaysia

The species' generation length (average age of parents in the population) is five years. It feeds on berries, insects, and small crustaceans, foraging these from the forest floor and short vegetation.

Nesting occurs in kerangas forests, with nests of dry leaves being built in tussocks of grass or lichen. Egg laying has been reported from mid-January onwards, with breeding males reported in March and young in April. Clutches have 8–9 light brown eggs with dark yellowish-brown streaking. Incubation takes 18–19 days in captivity.

== Status ==
The crimson-headed partridge is classified as being of least concern by the International Union for Conservation of Nature due to its fairly large range, sufficiently large population, and a lack of significant population decline. It was previously considered near-threatened and is thought to have a population of 1,000–10,000 total individuals, with 670–6,700 mature birds. It is locally common, but has a highly reduced range, with a declining population. There are no recent records of the species from central Kalimantan and its status there is unknown. It occurs in some protected areas like Kinabalu Park and Gunung Mulu National Park.
