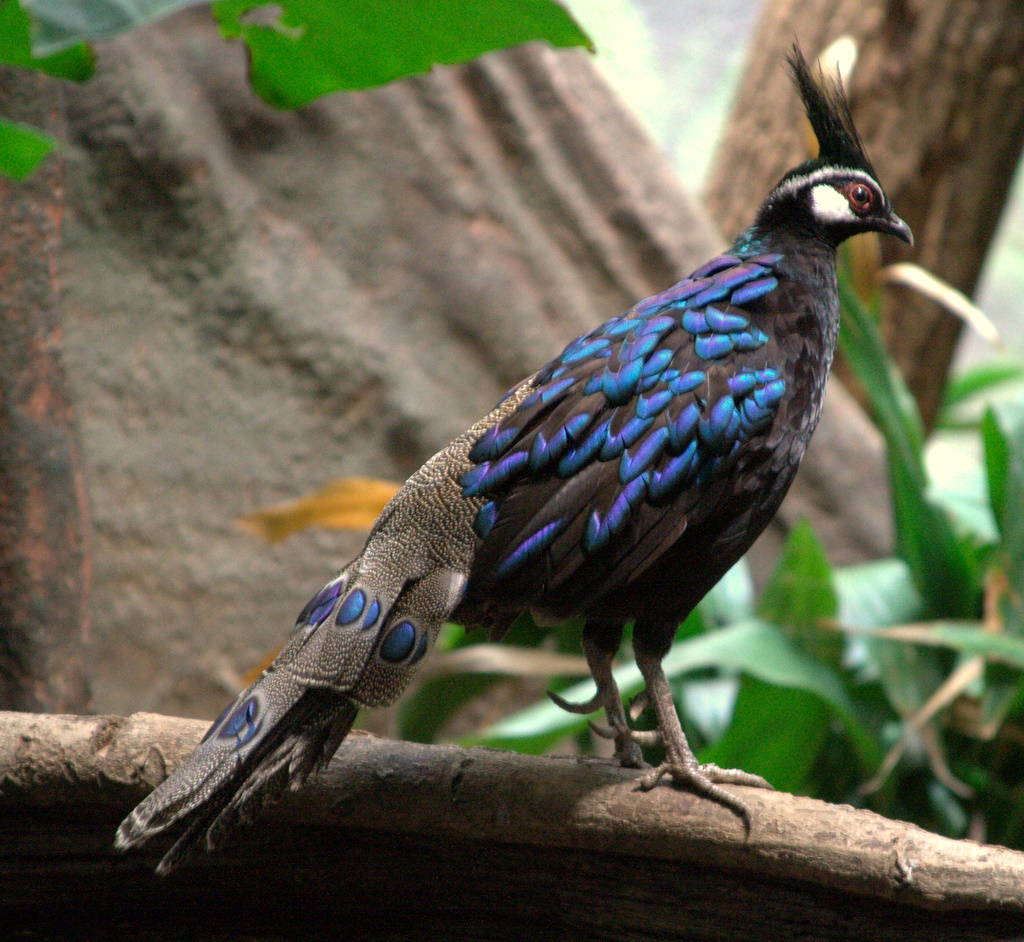
- Male at Bronx Zoo
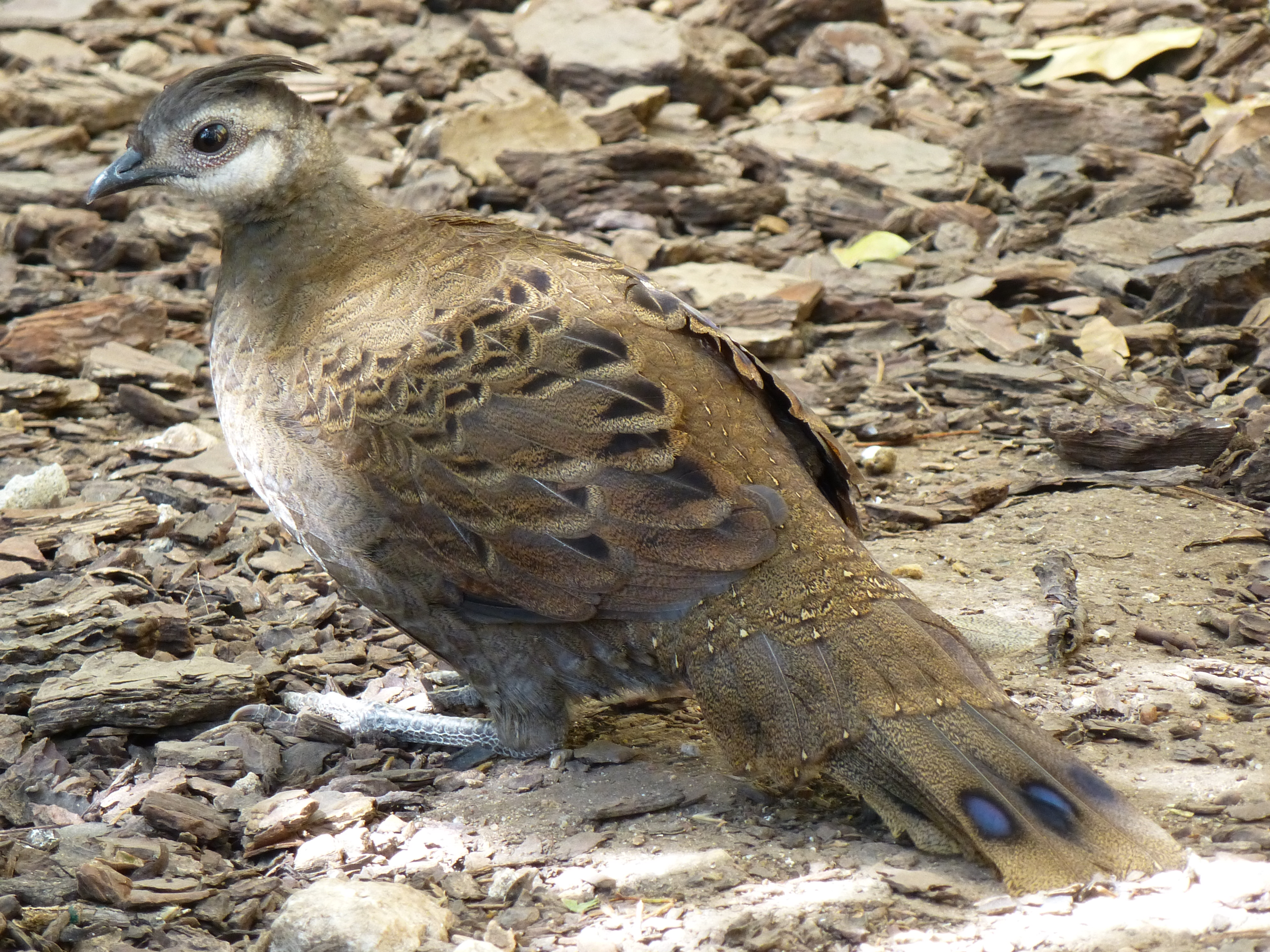
- Female at Lisbon Zoo

Conservation status
- Vulnerable (IUCN 3.1)
- CITES Appendix I

Scientific classification
- Kingdom: Animalia
- Phylum: Chordata
- Class: Aves
- Order: Galliformes
- Family: Phasianidae
- Genus: Polyplectron
- Species: P. napoleonis

Binomial name
- Polyplectron napoleonis Lesson, 1831
- Palawan peacock-pheasant range

Synonyms
- Polyplectrum napoleonis Lesson, 1831 (lapsus); Polyplectron emphanum Temminck, 1832

= Palawan peacock-pheasant =

Species of bird

The Palawan peacock-pheasant (Polyplectron napoleonis) is a medium-sized (up to 50cm long) bird in the family Phasianidae endemic to the island of Palawan in the Philippines. The spectacular male has a black body with blue marks on the wings, a grayish, finely speckled back and tail with blue peacock "eyes," white marks on the face, and a red eye-ring. Females are mostly brown but with a white face. It is known as tandikan in the some local Palawano (peras in Southwest Palawano), Tagbanwa, and Batak languages of Palawan. It is featured prominently in the culture of the indigenous people of Palawan. The bird is also depicted in the official seal of the city of Puerto Princesa and is in the Philippine one hundred-peso note This species is threatened by habitat loss, the illegal wildlife trade and hunting and is listed as a Vulnerable species by the International Union for Conservation of Nature.

== Description ==
The adult male is the most peacock-like in appearance member of the genus Polyplectron. It has an erectile crest and highly iridescent electric blue-violet, metallic green-turquoise dorsal plumage. Its breast and ventral regions are a velvety black. The flight feathers (rectrices) are wide, flat, and rigid; velvety black on the inner edges and an iridescent violet-blue-green on the outer edges. Their terminal edges are squared. The tail feathers are black with very fine golden-brown speckling. Each tail plume and upper-tail covert is marked with highly iridescent, light-reflective "eyes" (ocelli), each bordered by black and gray; they are also tipped in bands of black and gray. The tail is held erect and expanded laterally together with the bodies of the birds. The males also raise one wing and lower the other, laterally compressing the body during pair-bonding, courtship displays as well and may also be antipredator adaptation.

The female is slightly smaller than the male. Its contour plumage is cloudy silt in colouration. The mantle and breast are a dark sepia in coloration. The rectrices are essentially similar to those of the male, exhibiting marked adumbrations and stunning ocelli. Throughout, their plumage is earthen and difficult to distinguish from the substrate and branches. While it has similar proportions of the tail to the male, its markings are not as visually arresting. Like the male, the female has a short crest and is whitish on the throat, cheeks and eyebrows.

Chicks are vivid ginger and cinnamon hued with prominent yellow markings. Juveniles of both sexes in the first year closely resemble their mothers. Subadult males in their second year more closely resemble their fathers but the mantle and wing coverts are marked with adumbrations analogous with the ocelli in the contour plumage of other peacock-pheasant species.

Like other peacock-pheasants, Palawan males and some females exhibit multiple spurs on the metatarsus. These are used in anti-predator defense, foraging in leaf litter and contests with other males. The male Palawan excavates slight depressions in which it orients its body during postural display behaviors. The bird vibrates loudly via stridulation of rectrice quills. This communicative signal is both audible and as a form of seismic communication.

Palawan peacock-pheasants are strong fliers. Their flight is swift, direct and sustained.

== Distribution and habitat ==
Endemic to the Philippines, the Palawan peacock-pheasant is found in the humid forests of Palawan Island in the southern part of the Philippine archipelago. They are confined to the lowlands and foothills, at elevations normally below 1,000 m (3,300 ft) above sea level.

== Taxonomy ==
The Palawan peacock-pheasant, with its unique male plumage and distant range, represents a basal (Early? Pliocene, c.5-4 mya) offshoot of the genus Polyplectron (Kimball et al. 2001). The species is widely accepted to be monotypic, but while some males have white supercillia, giving a "double-barred" or masked appearance, others lack this trait, exhibiting dark faces, taller, denser crests and prominent white cheek spots. The birds with white supercillia are sometimes classified as a distinct subspecies, nehrkornae. The white-cheeked form may inhabit deep forest habitat with low ambient light in rolling terrain whilst the masked form appears to inhabit taller, more open forest on flatter terrain with higher ambient light. This masked form exhibits an abbreviated, more tightly compacted and highly iridescent crest. Females of the two respective forms exhibit analogous differentiation. The female of the masked form is more prominently patterned and densely crested with paler contour plumage.

It was long known as Polyplectron emphanum, but the name Polyplectron napoleonis was given one year before and takes priority over the newer name (Dickinson 2001). The species name “emphanum” comes from the Greek “emphaino” and means “showy, conspicuous, remarkable” referring to the splendid look of this bird.

== Behavior and ecology ==
Peacock-pheasants are highly invertivorous, taking isopods, earwigs, insect larvae, mollusks, centipedes and termites as well as small frogs, drupes, seeds and berries.

They are strictly monogamous, renesting yearly. The female usually lays up to two eggs. Both parents rearing chicks for up to two years. Males act as sentinels of nest sites and are highly pugnacious during the reproductive cycle.

Their call is a short high screech, each around 0.5 to 1 second long, and repeated every 5 seconds.

== Conservation status ==
Due to ongoing habitat loss, small population size and limited range as well as hunting and capture for trade, the Palawan peacock-pheasant is classified as Vulnerable in the IUCN Red List of Threatened Species. It is listed on Appendix I of CITES.

The seal of Puerto Princesa depicting a male Palawan peacock-pheasant

IUCN has assessed this bird as vulnerable with its population being estimated at 20,000 to 49,999 mature individuals. Forest loss, due to legal and illegal logging, mining and conversion into farmland and urban development, is its main threat. It is also hunted both for the pet trade and for its meat.

The whole of Palawan was designated as a Biosphere Reserve; however, protection and enforcement of laws has been difficult and these threats still continue. It occurs in just one protected area in Puerto Princesa Subterranean River National Park.

This species serves as a Flagship species and is the symbol of the city of Puerto Princesa.

Conservation actions proposed include surveys of remaining lowland forest to understand its true distribution and population status and to propose key sites as protected areas; better control hunting and traping; to assess its ecological requirements, particularly its sensitivity to habitat modification; to support the extension of Puerto Princesa Subterranean River National Park; and to formally protect the forests of Iwahig Prison and Penal Farm. Its also recommended that captive breeding programs.

== Gallery ==
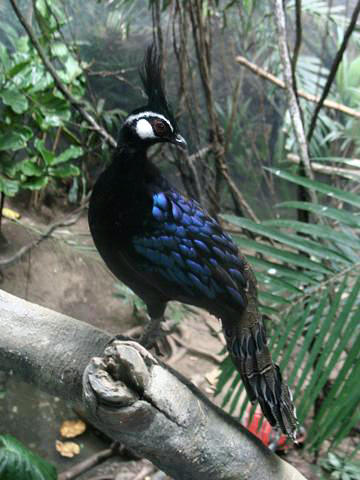
Male at Bronx Zoo

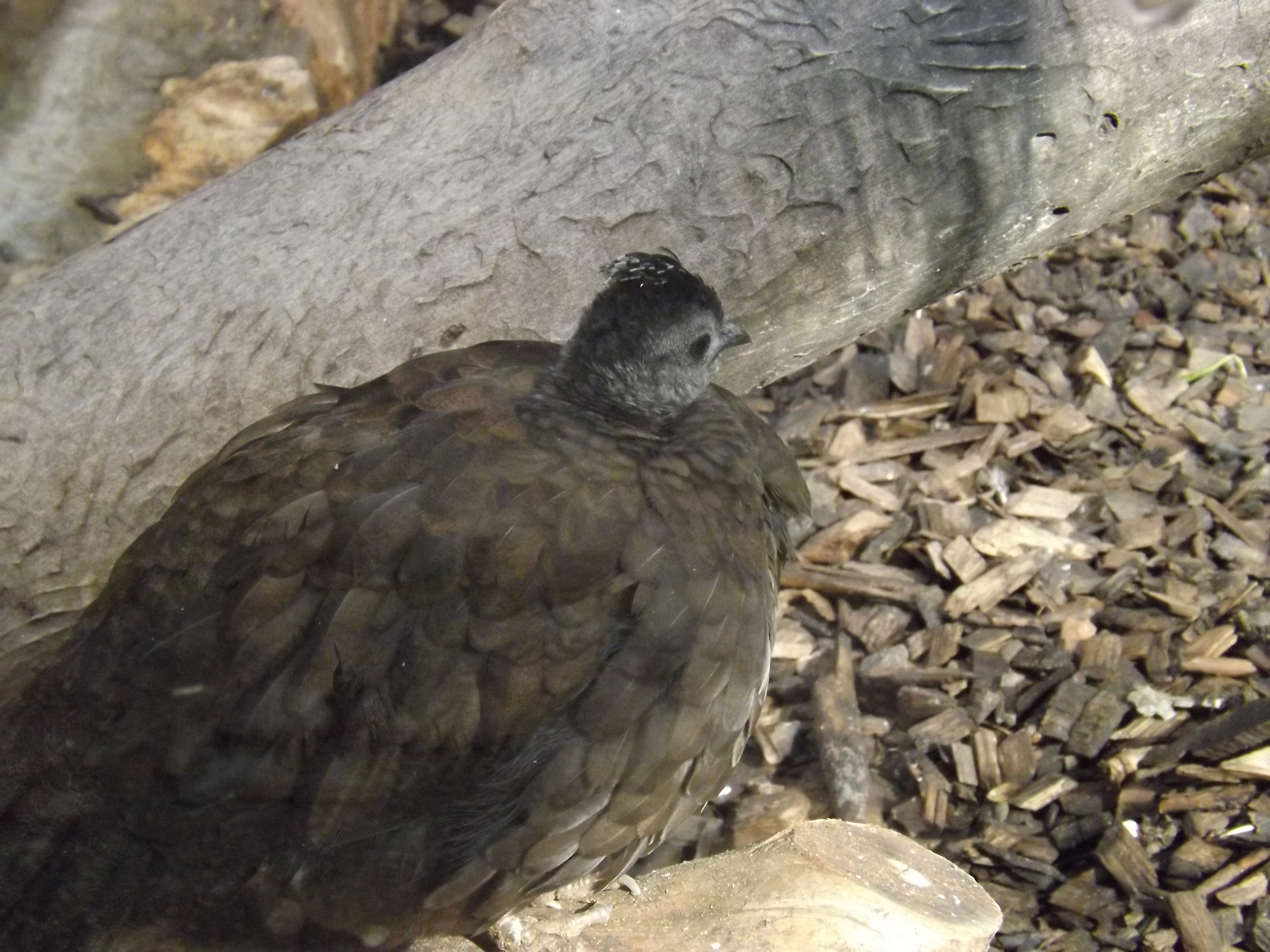
Female at Jerusalem Biblical Zoo

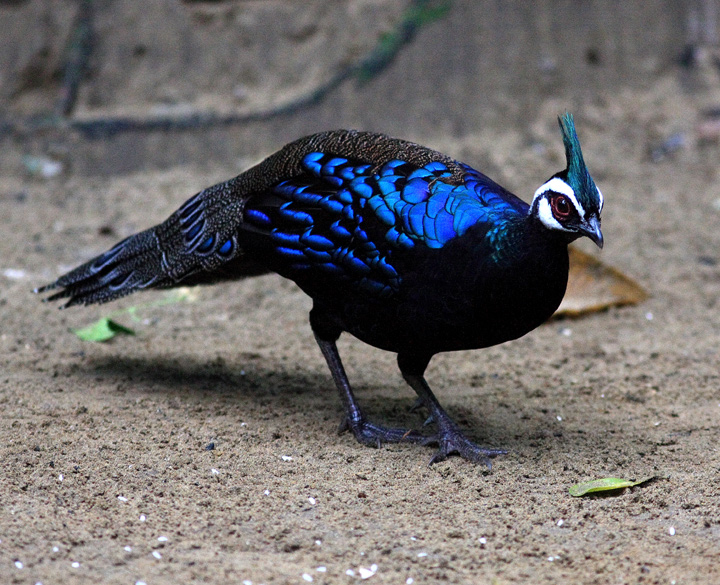
Male at Puerto Princesa , Palawan
