= Ovomucoid =

Protein found in egg whites

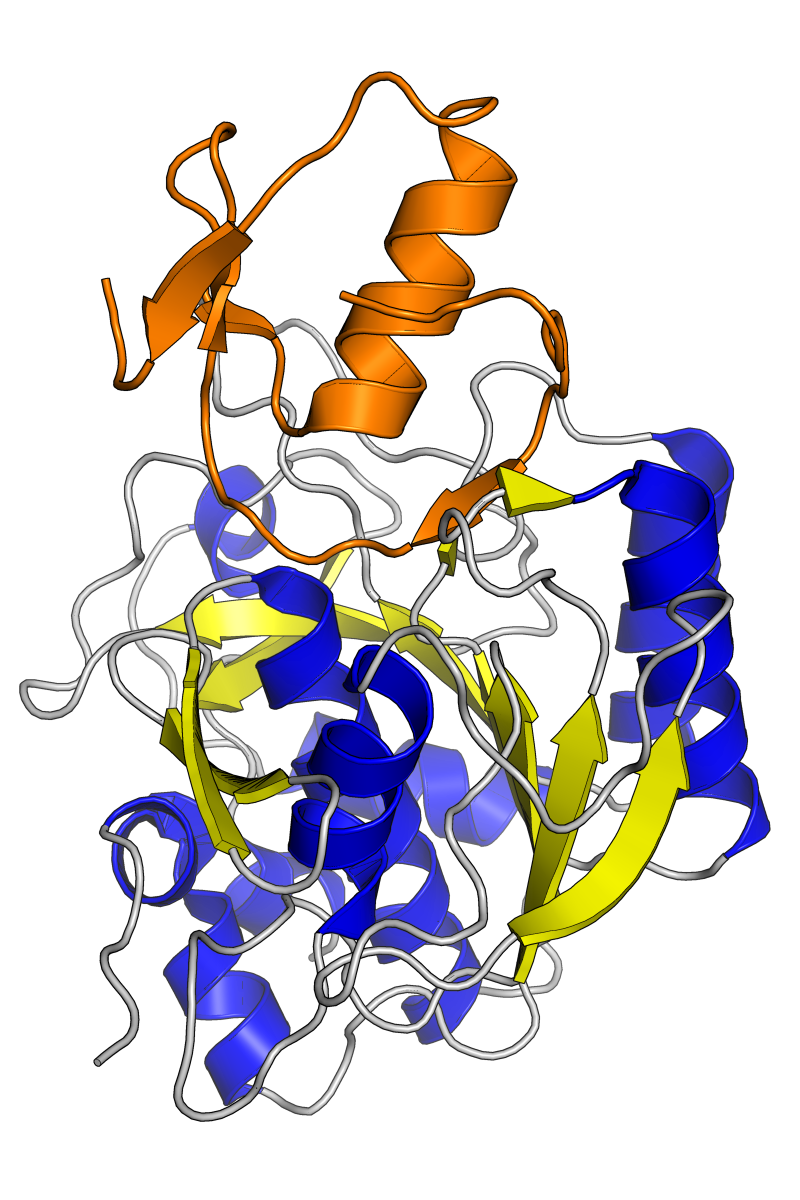
- The third Kazal domain of the turkey ovomucoid protein (orange) bound to subtilisin Carlsberg, a serine protease.

Identifiers
- Organism: Meleagris gallopavo
- Symbol: OVAL
- Entrez: 100541469
- Orthologs: NCBI: entry; OMA: entry
- RefSeq (mRNA): XM_031555706.1
- RefSeq (Prot): XP_031411566.1
- UniProt: P68390

Other data
- Chromosome: 15: 9.8 - 9.81 Mb
Search for
- Structures: Swiss-model
- Domains: InterPro

Ovomucoid

Identifiers
- Organism: Gallus gallus
- Symbol: OVAL
- Entrez: 396058
- Orthologs: NCBI: entry; OMA: entry
- RefSeq (mRNA): NM_205152.3
- RefSeq (Prot): NP_990483.2
- UniProt: P01005

Other data
- Chromosome: 2: 67.42 - 67.43 Mb
Search for
- Structures: Swiss-model
- Domains: InterPro

Ovomucoid is a protein found in egg whites. Ovomucoid's main source are various avian species like chickens (Gallus gallus domesticus) and ducks (Anatidae). It makes up approximately 11% of proteins found in egg whites.

It is a trypsin inhibitor composed of three protein domains of the Kazal domain family. The homologs from chickens (Gallus gallus) and especially turkeys (Meleagris gallopavo) are the best characterized. It is not related to the similarly named ovomucin, another egg white protein.

Chicken ovomucoid, also known as Gal d 1, is a known allergen. It is the protein most often causing egg allergy. At least four IgE epitopes have been identified. Three other egg white proteins are also identified as allergenic: ovalbumin (Gal d 2), ovotransferrin (Gal d 3) and lysozyme (Gal d 4).

== Structure ==
=== Primary ===
Ovocumoid consists of approximately 186 amino acids, which are composed of three protein domains, each containing about 60 amino acids.

=== Secondary ===
Ovomucoid is a glycoprotein with a secondary structure that makes up approximately 46% β-sheet, 10% β-turns, 26% α-helix, and 18% random coils.

=== Tertiary ===
Each domain is attributed by five carbohydrate side chains on each domain, as well as a total of nine intra-domain disulfide bonds, also known as inter-chain disulfide bonds. Every disulfide bond is formed between two cysteine amino acids located within the same polypeptide chain.

Ovomucoid contains an isoelectric point of approximately 4.1 indicating an overall acidic protein, and containing a molecular weight of 28 kDa. In contrast to other proteins found in egg whites, Ovomucoid is significantly resistant to heat, making it a thermo-resistant molecule. As a result, individuals who are allergic to ovomucoid remain allergic to eggs after cooking, as the protein cannot be denatured through heat. As the main allergen in eggs, it contains trypsin inhibitor activity, meaning it can block the enzyme trypsin, a crucial enzyme in that aids in digestion by breaking down proteins.

=== Variants ===
Ovomucoid is present in thousands of avian species that lay eggs, which can result in natural differences and variation. These differences are a result of genetic differences that occur across species such as chickens, quails, and ostriches. While the protein ovomucoid serves for the same overall purposes, the structures of ovomucoid can vary. The most common reason for variations is due to glycosylation, where different combinations of sugars are attached to the protein. As a result, these changes can drastically affect how an individual's immune system reacts when consumed or tested through IgE antibodies.

=== Post-translational modifications ===
Glycolysation promotes the stability of ovomucoid by helping the protein maintain its structure and survive in extreme heat conditions, such as those when cooking. There are two recurring types of glycosylation, including O-linked and N-linked glycosylation. O-linked glycosylation occurs when sugars attach to the amino acid serine or threonine. N-linked glycosylation occurs when sugars attach to the amino acid asparagine. The A subunit of ovomucoid is primarily N-glycosylated, whereas the B subunit is primarily O-glycosylated. O-linked glycans contain sialic acid and are more complex than N-linked glycans, which play a role in maintaining stability in the protein. Sugar chains allow for variation in ovomucoid glycosylation patterns. Many of these differences can be observed through electrophoresis for laboratory research.

== Function ==
Ovomucoid carries out multiple important biological functions in egg whites, most importantly providing protection to an avian species embryo from enzymes that break proteins apart and from harmful bacterial growth. This occurs when enzymes, such as trypsin, prevent the breaking down of proteins in an egg, allowing the egg to remain undamaged. As the development process in the avian egg continues, Ovomucoid is then relocated to the yolk sac and continues to regulate the activity of enzymes. However, once the chick is developed, it begins to make its own digestive enzymes and no longer requires ovomucoid. Ovomucoid is later broken down and eliminated through digestion as waste.

The inhibitory activity of ovomucoid can be allocated to the structure of its three Kazal-type domains, which promotes its necessary functions and its stability. Each Kazal-type domain has inhibitory activity, however domain three is often the most well-known for having the highest inhibitory activity and is most effective at blocking the enzyme trypsin. The inhibitory function of domain three is primarily controlled by the amino acid at the P1 position, and varies across avian species. When the amino acid at the P1 position is altered, domain three can block serine proteases that are inhibited.

== Allergenicity ==
Ovomucoid is the primary allergen in egg whites and the source of the majority of egg allergies in humans. The stability of ovomucoid allows this protein to remain intact when eggs are cooked. Allergies to eggs are most commonly seen in young children, with a rate of approximately 1.3-1.6%. Meanwhile, in adults, allergic reactions to eggs are seen in less than 0.25%.

Blood tests are routinely used to quantify amounts of IgE antibodies present that may react to ovomucoid and trigger an allergic reaction. This test is commonly referred to as an OVMU or an ovomucoid IgE blood test, commonly performed using FEIA. During the testing process, a blood sample is collected at a clinic or medical laboratory, the sample is then separated, and the serum obtained is analyzed for how strongly the immune system reacts to ovomucoid. The values are typically interpreted and reported in kU/L, where a value of 0.35 kU/L is considered positive. Higher levels of antibodies suggest stronger egg allergies. These tests are commonly performed to help diagnose, promote specific dietary recommendations, and reduce the risk of complications.

== Chemical properties ==
Ovomucoid demonstrates various chemical characteristics that promote its stability, bioreactivity, and allergenicity. The protein is highly soluble in water, however solubility is affected by other proteins present and temperature. It is also considered to be insoluble when combined and heated with wheat gluten.

== Laboratory methods ==
Isolation of ovomucoid is performed using a variety of laboratory techniques, including precipitation, chromatography, centrifugation, and filtration methods. Through these methods, researchers are able to purify ovomucoid from samples of egg whites. Additionally, the most commonly used applications of ovomucoid are in a health laboratory setting, commonly used for allergy testing. Such procedures performed in a health laboratory are Enzyme-Linked Immunosorbent Assay (ELISA), a fluorecent enzyme immunoassay test (FEIA), and immunoglobulin E (IgE) blood tests.

== Genetic engineering ==
Research laboratories have also created ovomucoid variants that have been genetically engineered and modified. Modified forms of ovomucoid are commonly used for studies and to allow researchers to understand and break down different components of the protein that may be responsible for causing egg allergies, and to produce genetically modified food products for those with special dietary needs. The genetically modified ovomucoid is produced through the study of genomics and genome editing tools such as CRISPR-Cas9. A mother hen's DNA is edited so that her offspring contains little or no ovomucoid. The process is called a gene knockout, in which the gene controlling the production of ovomucoid is inactivated. Through targeting and deleting specific exons in a chicken's DNA, the production of ovomucoid is controlled. Implications regarding the safety and quality of genetically modified eggs have not allowed the product to be available on the market, however there are multiple egg alternatives available on the market for those with dietary restrictions.

== Discovery ==
Ovomucoid was first identified as an allergen causing glycoprotein in egg whites in 1971 by the researchers Bleumink and Young. Their research primarily focused on studying parts of egg white that cause skin reactions, using immunoelectrophoresis. The protein's resistance to heat treatment was established by further studies in the 1990s. The greater allergenicity of ovomucoid, compared to ovalbumen, was established by a 1994 study.

== Ongoing research ==
Efforts to develop non-allergenic eggs are ongoing. Allergen-free eggs were initially developed by researchers at Hiroshima University, using Transcription Activator-Like Effector Nucleases (TALEN), which, similarly to CRISPR-Cas9, cuts and modifies DNA.

Hens that underwent genetic modification were homozygous, exhibited good physical health, and laid eggs free of ovomucoid with no complications. The hens were also analyzed for any adverse reactions and DNA mutations; however most changes were minor with little to no effect on protein-coding genes
