= Shanghai Zoo =

Shanghai Zoological Park
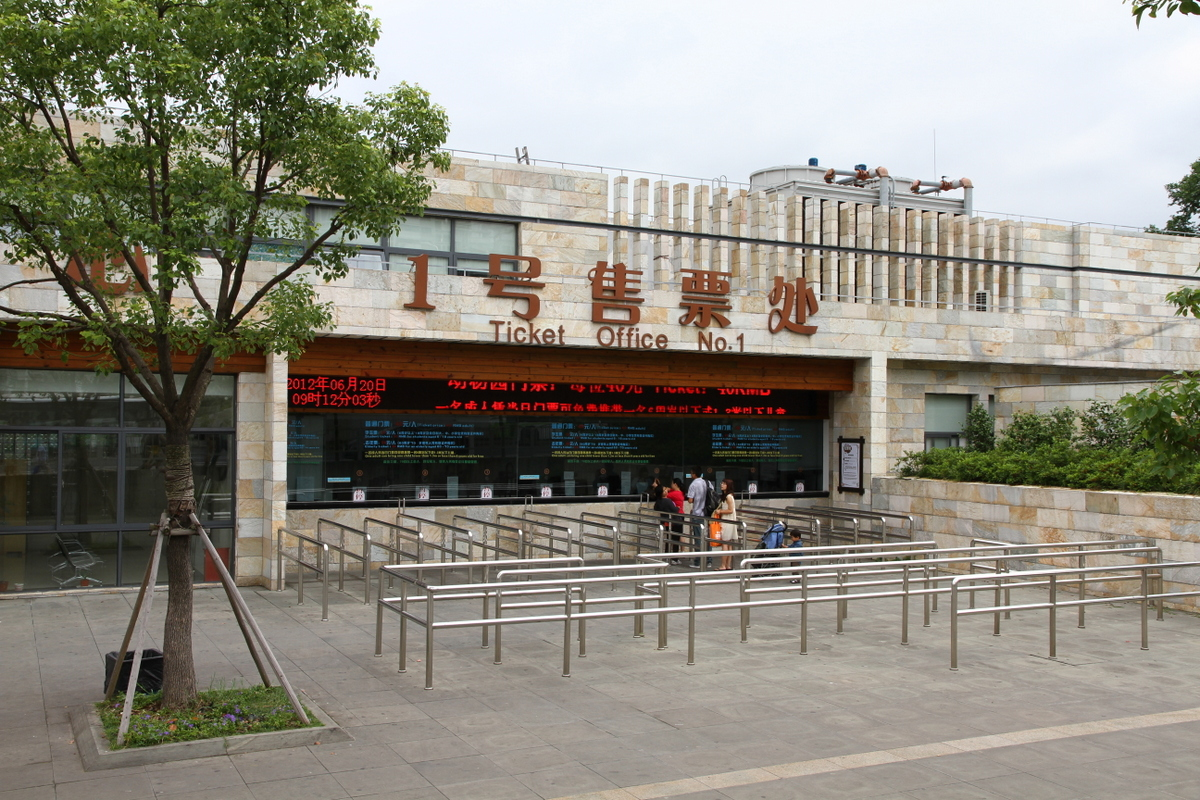
- The No. 1 ticket booth
- Interactive map of Shanghai Zoological Park
- 31°11′44″N 121°21′32″E
- Location: No. 2368 Hongqiao Road, Changning District, Shanghai
- No. of animals: 6,000
- Owner: Shanghai Forestry Bureau
- Website: www.shanghaizoo.cn

Shanghai Zoological Park (simplified Chinese: 上海动物园; traditional Chinese: 上海動物園; pinyin: Shànghǎi Dòngwùyuán), or commonly Shanghai Zoo in short, is one of the two main zoos in Shanghai. It is located near the township of Hongqiao (formerly Hung-Jao) and is administratively in Changning District. Shanghai Zoo was formerly known as "Xijiao Park" (or "Western Suburbs Park") (simplified Chinese: 西郊公园; traditional Chinese: 西郊公園; pinyin: Xījiāo Gōngyuán), which is still a common name used locally for the zoo.

== History ==
The site of what is presently the Shanghai Zoo was first developed as livery stables in 1890. In 1914, the livery stables were purchased by a consortium of merchants, and in 1916 it was converted into the Hung-Jao Golf Club,[ one of Shanghai's largest golf clubs. Like many other foreign-owned clubs, its property was in 1953 "resumed" by the new government, after the Chinese Communist Party took over Shanghai in 1949. In 1954, the former golf course was opened to the public 1954 as "Xijiao Park". In 1959, a series of animal enclosures were built and the park was expanded. In 1980, the park was renamed "Shanghai Zoological Park". In 1992, a Ferris wheel was built and remained in operation until its decommissioning in 2024.

== Current zoo ==
After half a century of development, the Shanghai Zoo is now a very large ecological garden in China. The zoo houses and exhibits more than 6,000 animals, including 600 species native to China.

The original golf course design has been basically preserved. There are a total of 100,000 trees with nearly 600 species planted in the zoo. The green areas and lawns cover an area of 100,000 square meters. The zoo endeavours to create an ecologically friendly environment for the animals - the 'Swan Lake' with its natural reed clumps and trees providing shade for pelicans, geese, black swans, night herons and other birds, is a perfect example of this.

The Shanghai Zoo provides areas for amusement and leisure, opportunities for visitors to increase their knowledge of the various animals and combines this with scientific and technical research to help people better understand and protect animals. Since the zoo was established it has been host to over 150,000,000 visitors.

The aim of the Shanghai Zoo is to have visitors leave with a better understanding of and appreciation for the animals and their environment.

=== Animals ===
List of animals

Swan Lake

- Bar-headed goose
- Black swan
- Dalmatian pelican
- Great white pelican
- Mallard
- Mandarin duck
- Mute swan
- Whooper swan
- Swan goose
- Common shelduck
- Green-winged teal
- Greater white-fronted goose
- Bean goose
- Eurasian wigeon
- Ruddy shelduck

Aviary

- Orange-headed thrush
- Hoopoe
- White wagtail
- Drongos
- Oriental greenfinches
- Black-collared starling

Outdoor Bird Garden

- Common ostrich
- Emu
- Greater rhea
- Southern cassowary

Pheasant Corridor

- Blue eared pheasant
- Brown eared pheasant
- Elliot's pheasant
- Golden pheasant
- Lady Amherst's pheasant
- Silver pheasant
- Swinhoe's pheasant
- Temminck's tragopan
- White eared pheasant

Big Cat Enclosures

- Bengal tiger
- Jaguar
- Siberian tiger
- Lion
- South China tiger

Native Animal Zone

- Asian small-clawed otter
- Chinese water deer
- Indochinese porcupine
- Leopard
- Leopard cat
- Oriental stork
- Raccoon dog
- South China tiger
- Wolf

Panda House and Bear Hill

- Asian black bear
- Brown bear
- Giant panda
- Red panda
- Sun bear

Herbivore Paddocks

- Addax
- Alpaca
- Asian elephant
- Bactrian camel
- Black muntjac
- Blesbok
- Blue sheep
- Common eland
- Giraffe
- Golden takin
- Himalayan tahr
- Hog deer
- Mongolian wild ass
- Northern red muntjac
- Plains zebra
- Przewalski's horse
- Red deer
- Red goral
- Reeves's muntjac
- Sambar deer
- Scimitar-horned oryx
- Sika deer

Kangaroo Zone

- Eastern grey kangaroo
- Parma wallaby
- Red kangaroo
- Red-necked wallaby

Aquatic Mammals Boardwalk

- Afro-Australian fur seal
- Brazilian tapir
- Hippopotamus
- Largha seal
- Southern white rhinoceros

Raptor Area

- Golden eagle
- Monk vulture
- Griffon vulture
- Black-eared kite
- Shikra
- Oriental honey-buzzard
- Common kestrel
- American kestrel

Flamingo Pond

- Greater flamingo
- Lesser flamingo

Waterbird Houses

- Painted stork*
- Yellow-billed stork*
- Brown booby*
- White-breasted waterhen
- Slaty-backed gull
- Black-headed gull
- Herring gull
- Great cormorant
- Scaly-sided merganser
- Grey heron

Parrot House

- Cockatiels
- Amazon parrots
- Sulphur-crested cockatoos
- Green-winged macaws
- Scarlet macaws
- Blue-and-gold macaws
- Umbrella cockatoos
- Eclectus parrots
- Peach-faced lovebirds
- Salmon-crested cockatoo
- Long-billed corella
- Moustached parakeet

Hornbill and Toucan Circle

- Wreathed hornbill
- Great hornbill
- Toco toucan
- Red-billed toucan
- Western crowned pigeon
- Oriental pied hornbills

Wader Stream

- Common crane
- Oriental stork
- Black crowned crane
- Red-crowned crane
- Little egret
- Black-crowned night heron
- White-naped crane
- Chinese pond heron
- Demoiselle crane

Indoor Bird House

- Black-naped oriole
- Diamond dove
- Red-billed blue magpie
- Black-billed magpie
- Java finch
- Plumbeous water redstart
- Common myna
- Oriental dollarbird
- Bulbuls
- Domestic canary
- Black-capped kingfisher
- Laughing kookaburra

Penguin Pool

- African penguin

Primates

- Black-and-white ruffed lemur
- Black-capped capuchin
- Bornean orangutan
- Chimpanzee
- Colombian spider monkey
- Common marmoset
- Common squirrel monkey
- Eastern black-and-white colobus
- François' langur
- Golden snub-nosed monkey
- Golden-headed lion tamarin
- Hamadryas baboon
- Lion-tailed macaque
- Mandrill
- Northern white-cheeked gibbon
- Olive baboon
- Patas monkey
- Pileated gibbon
- Ring-tailed lemur
- Siamang
- Skywalker hoolock gibbon
- Stump-tailed macaque
- Vervet
- Western lowland gorilla

Amphibians, Reptiles

- Asian water monitor
- Green iguana
- King cobra
- Leatherback turtle
- Indian cobra
- Indian python
- Albino Indian python
- Japanese giant salamander
- Bearded dragon
- Radiated tortoise
- Chinese softshell turtle
- Aldabra giant tortoise
- Spectacled caiman
- Chinese stripe-necked turtle
- Chinese pond turtle
- Red-eared slider
- Chinese alligator

Fresh-and Saltwater Aquarium

- Whitefin sharksucker
- Spadefish
- Moorish idol
- Pennant coralfish
- Threadfin butterflyfish
- Pufferfish
- Chinese sturgeon
- Bighead carp
- Common carp
- Freshwater angelfish
- Neon tetras
- Blood parrot cichlid
- Giant gourami
- Surgeonfish

Goldfish Hall

- Goldfish

Children's Zoo

- Capybara
- Meerkat
- Raccoon

== Gallery ==
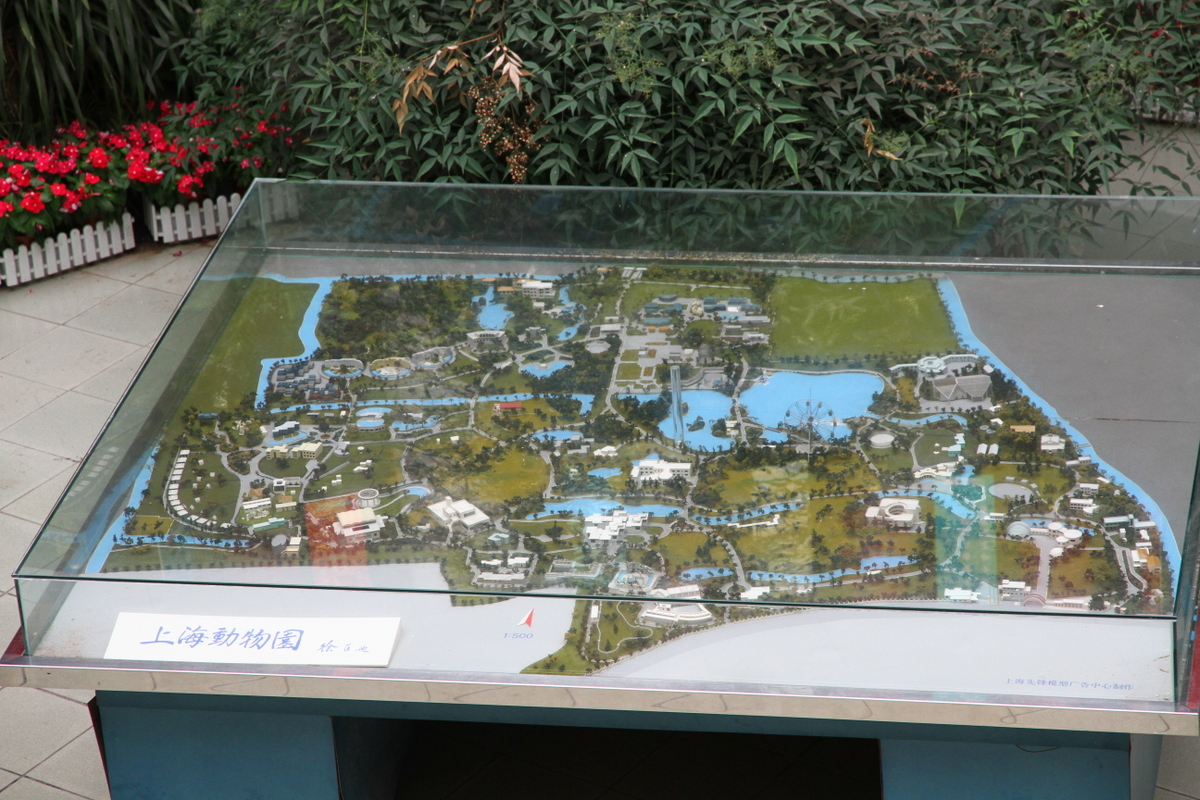
Model of the zoo

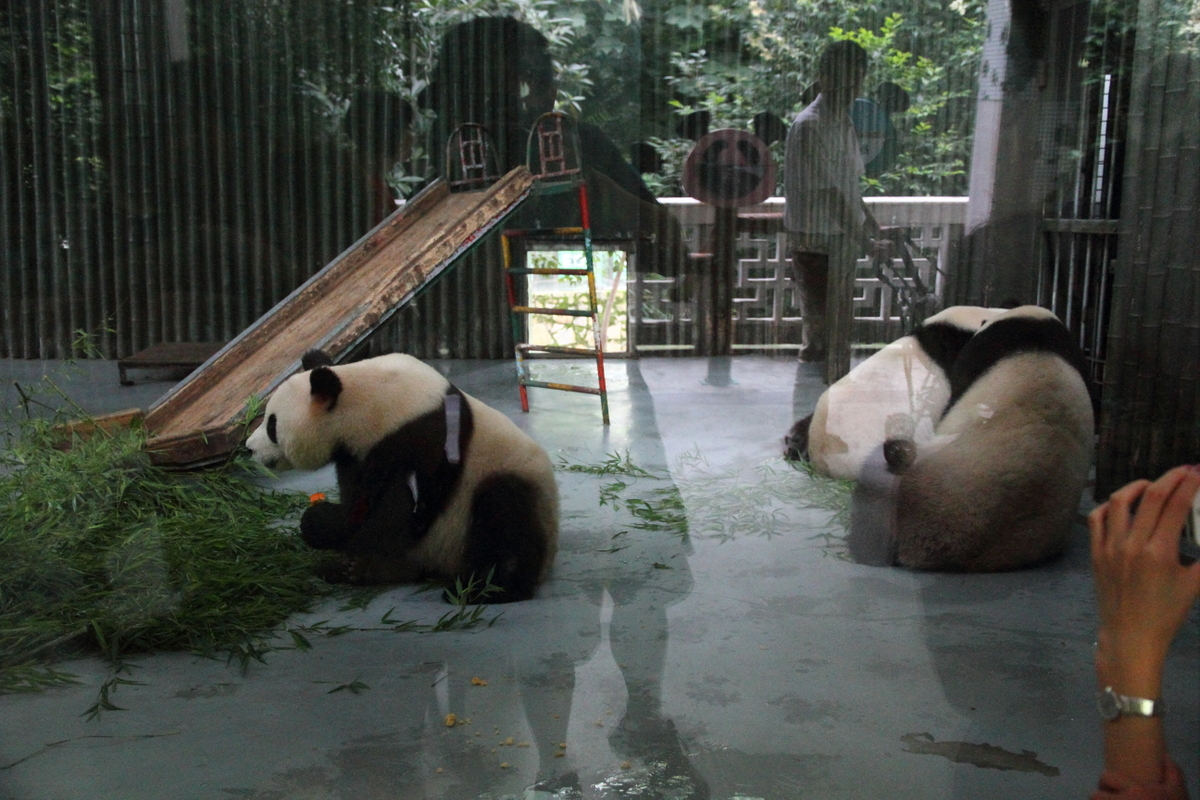
Giant pandas at the zoo

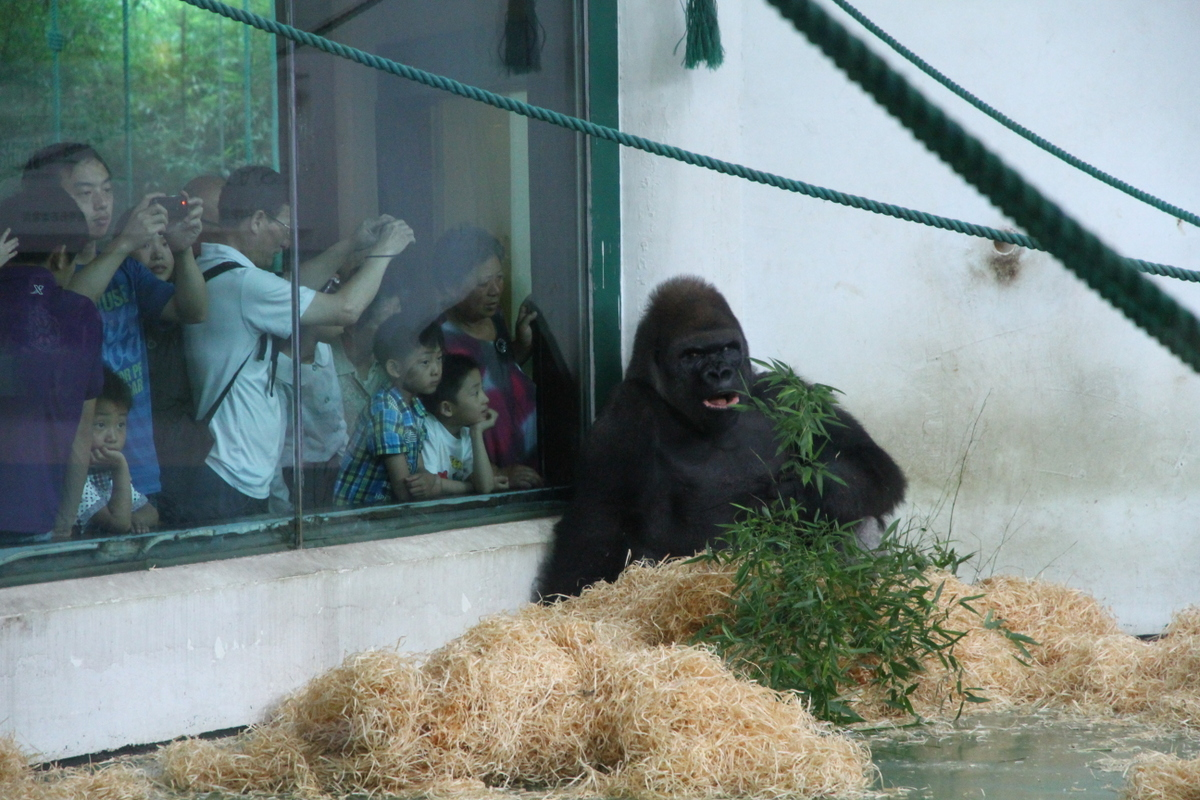
Gorilla enclosure

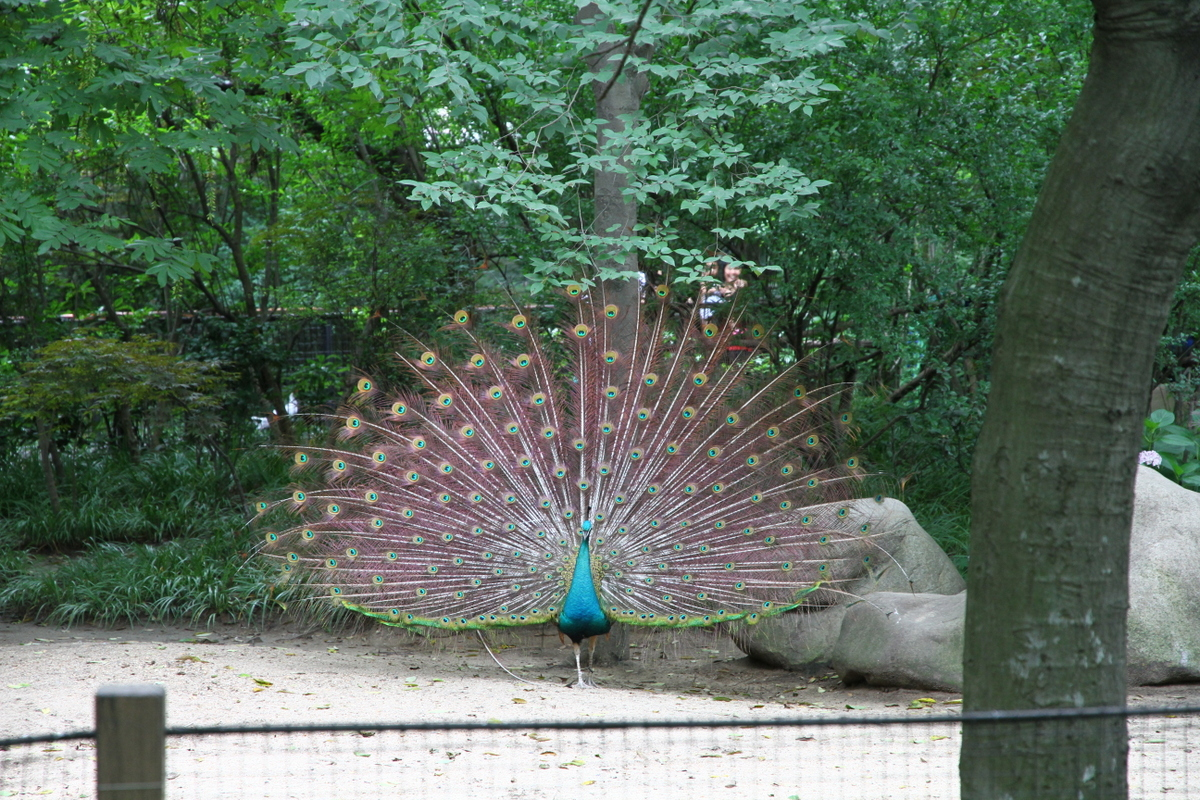
Peacock

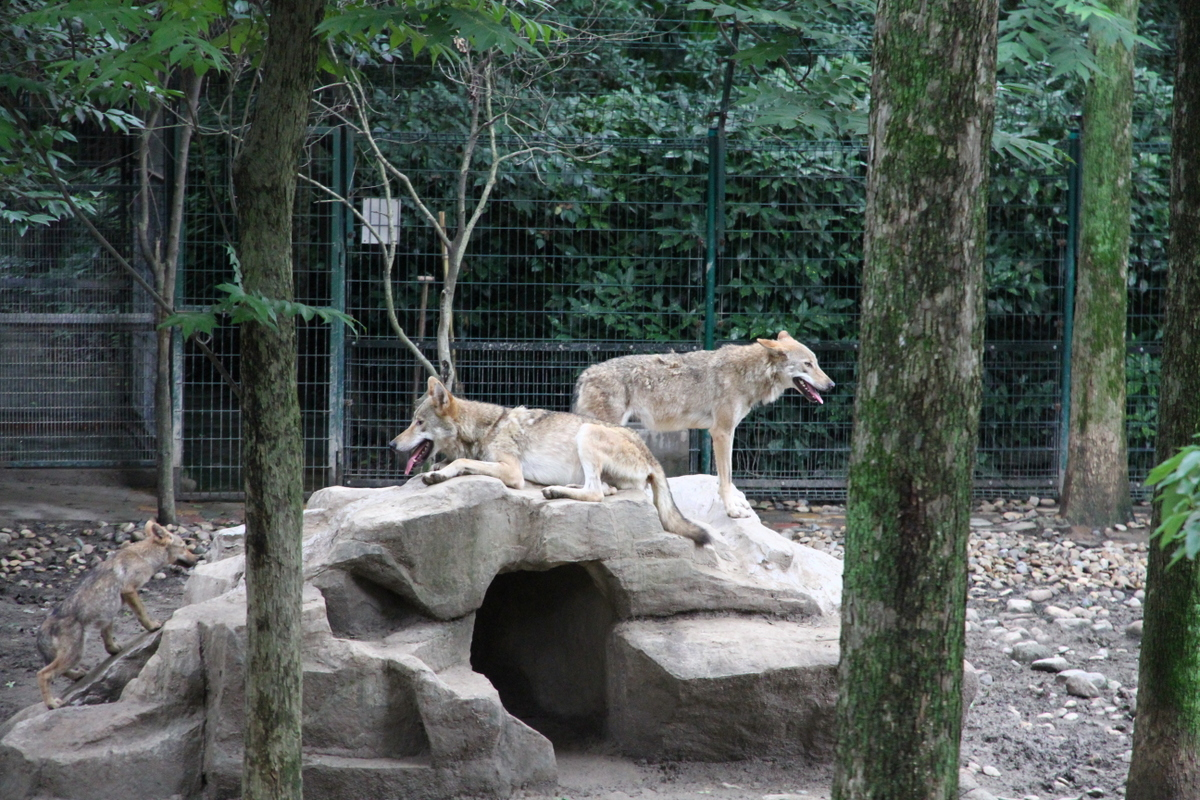
Wolf enclosure

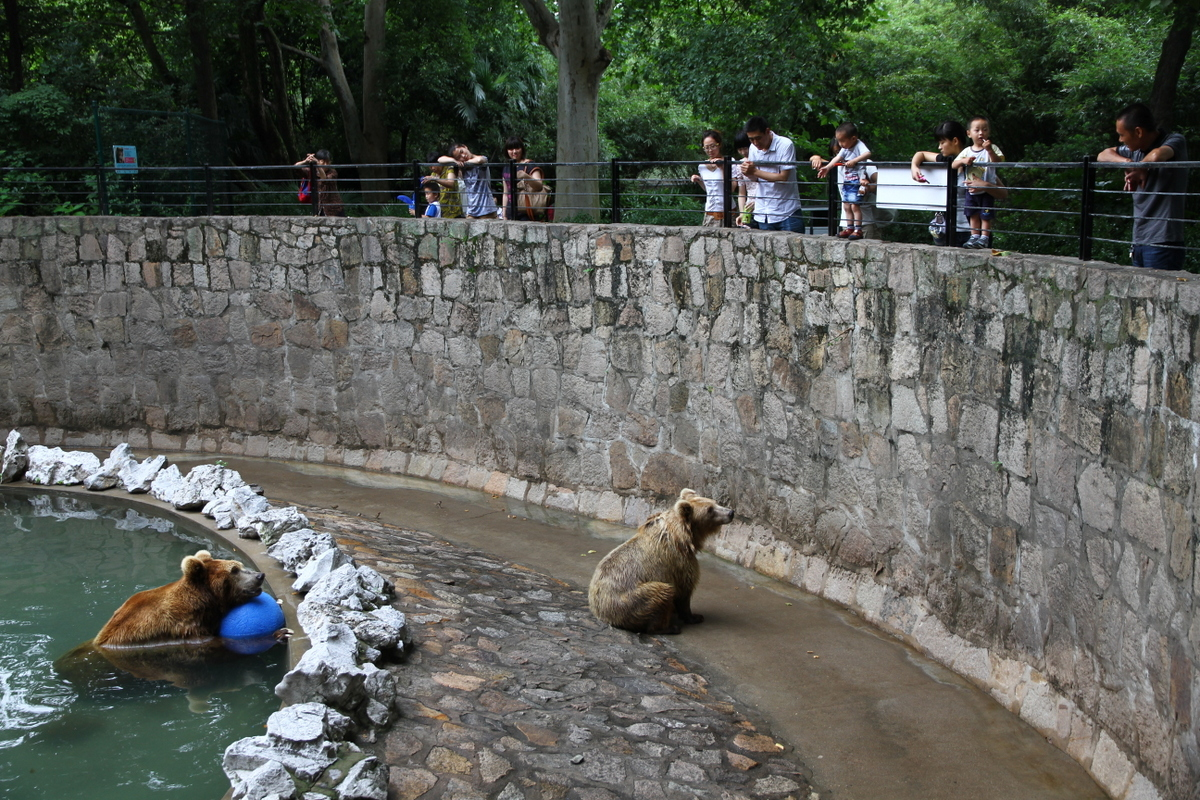
Brown Bear pit

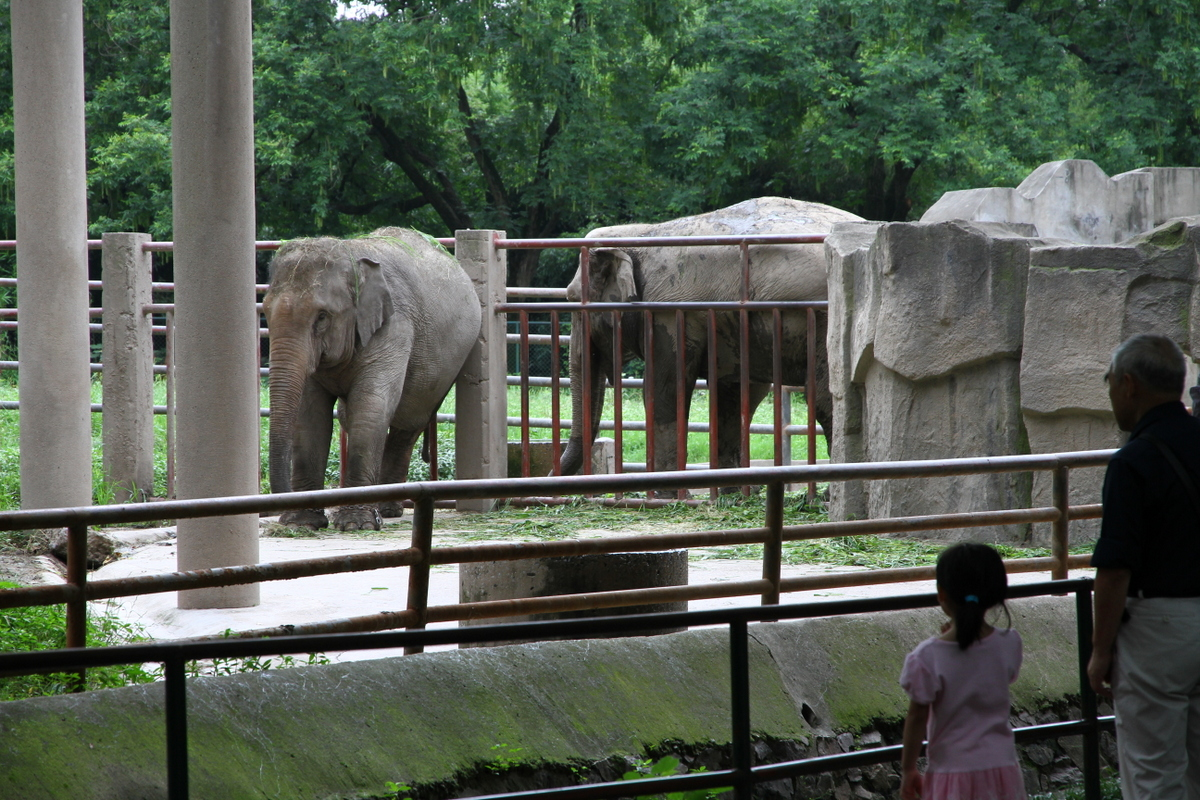
Elephant enclosure

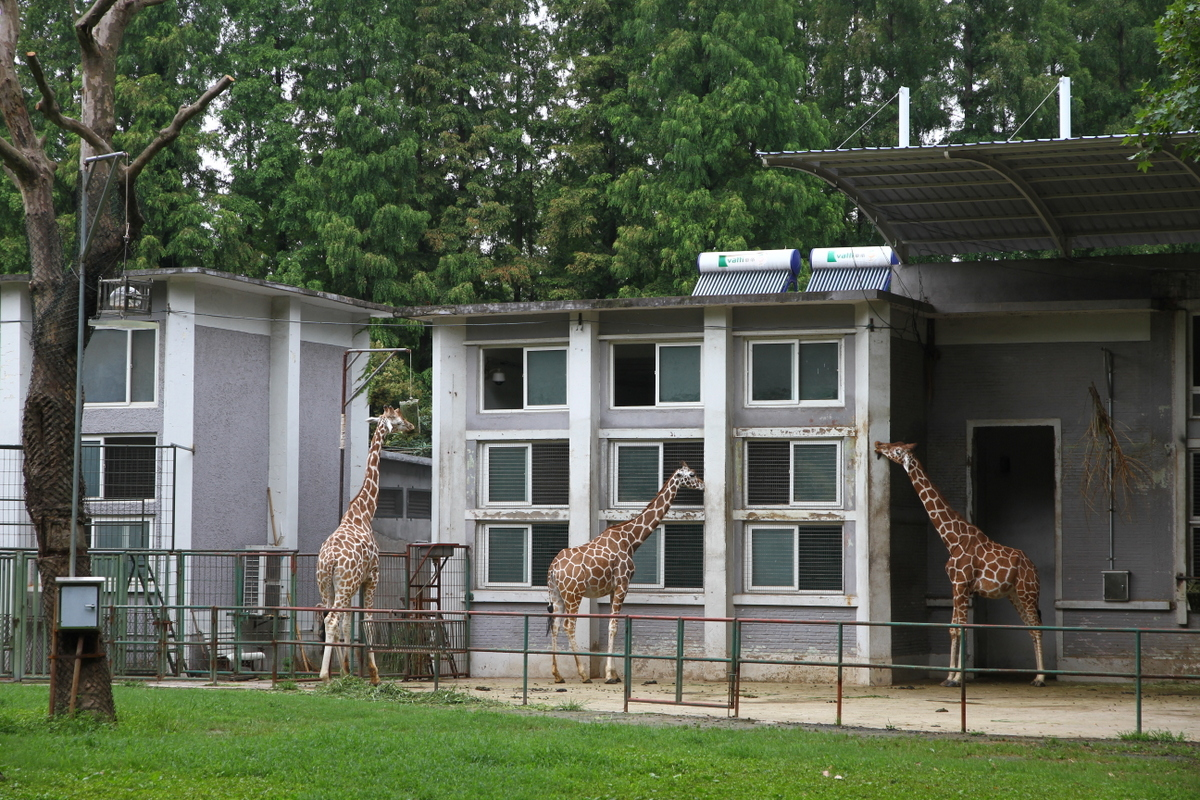
Giraffe enclosure

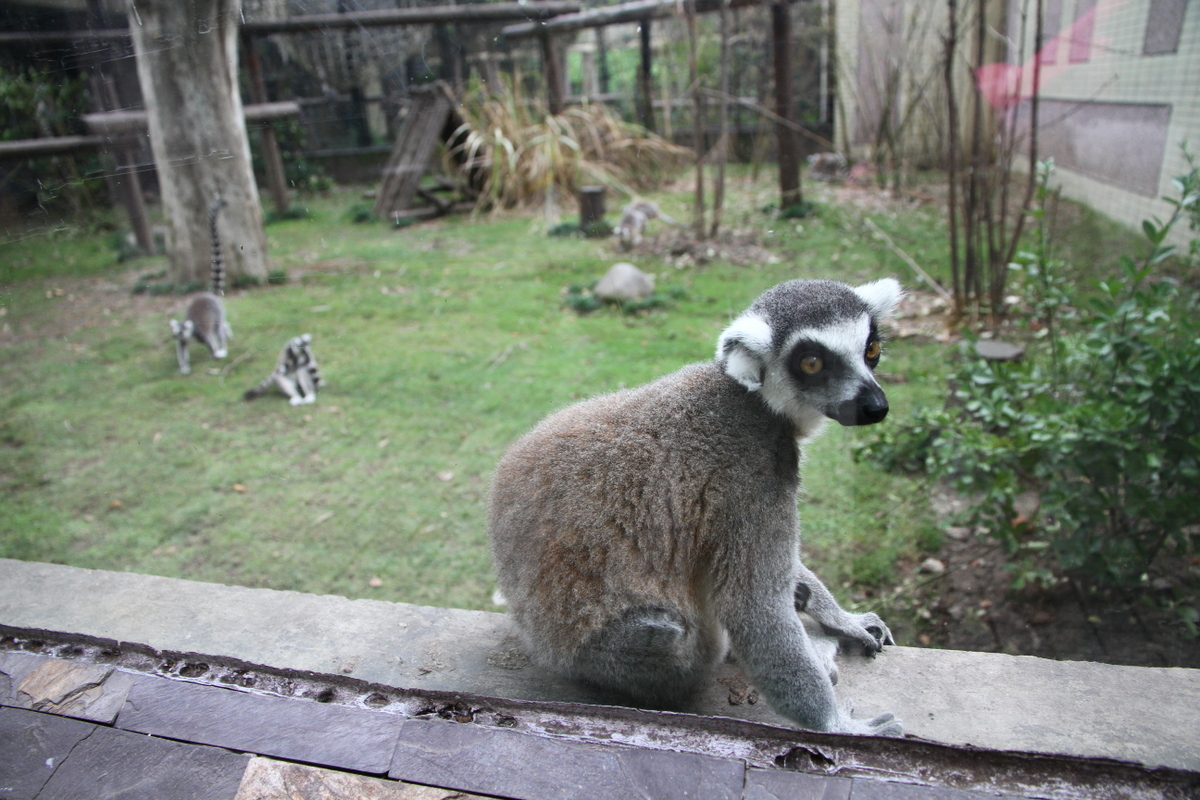
Ring-tailed lemur

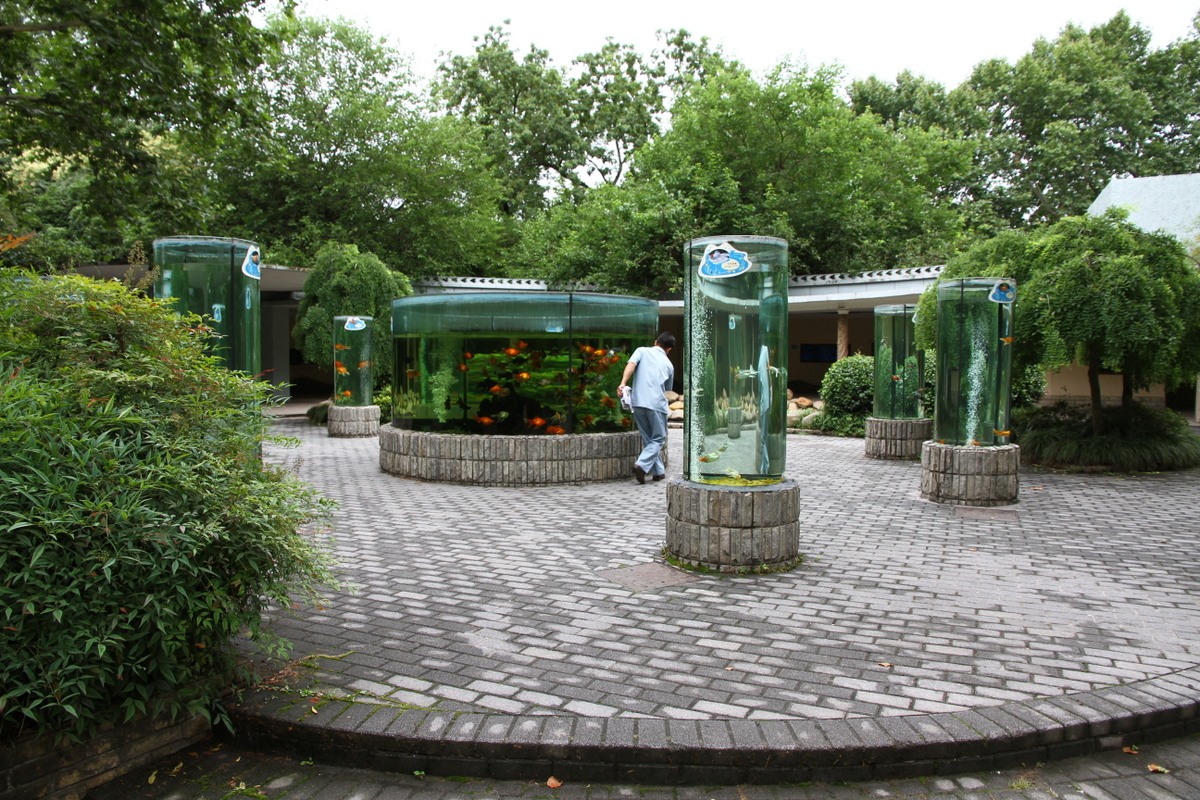
Fish tank

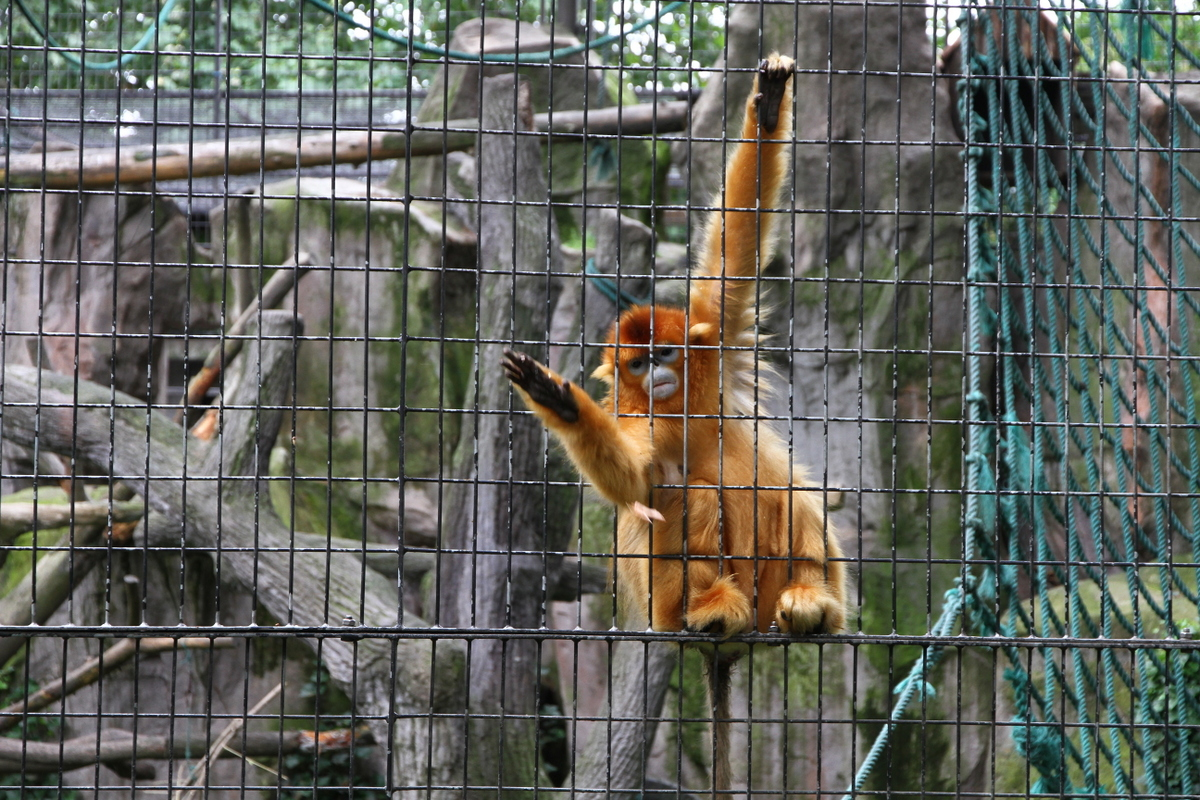
Golden snub-nosed monkey

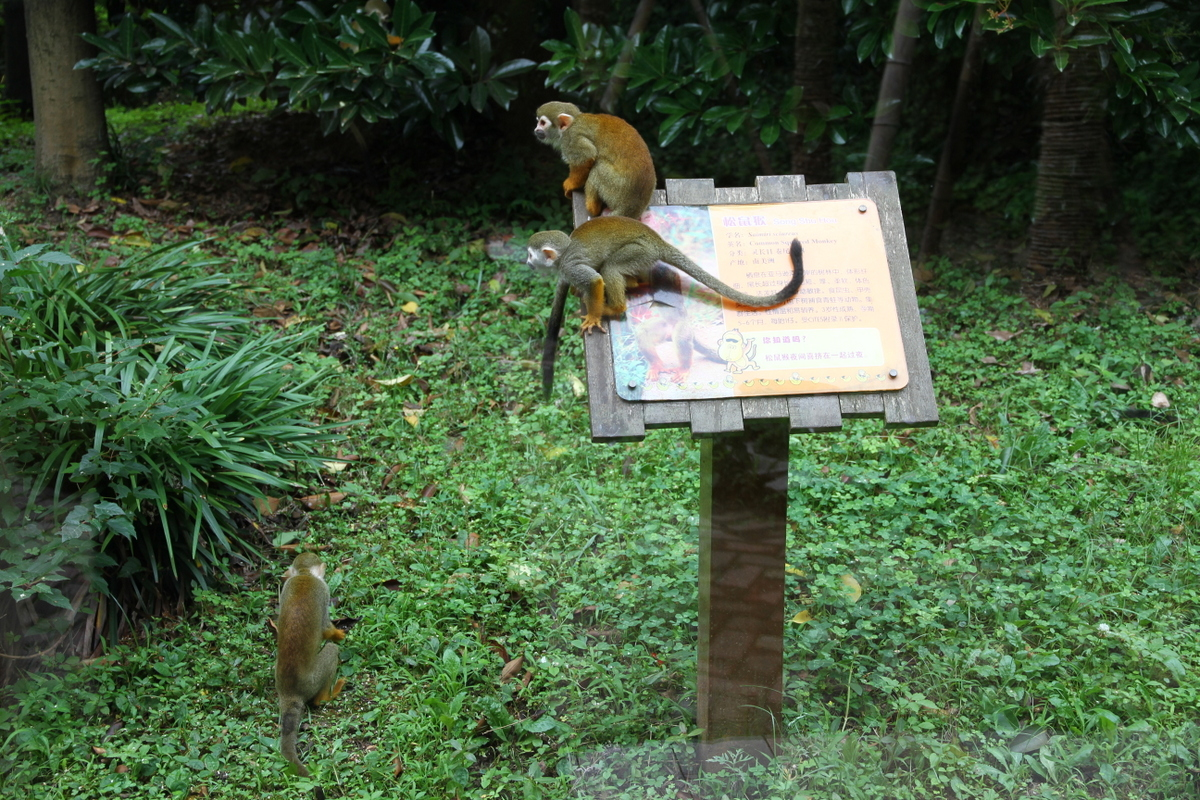
Squirrel monkeys

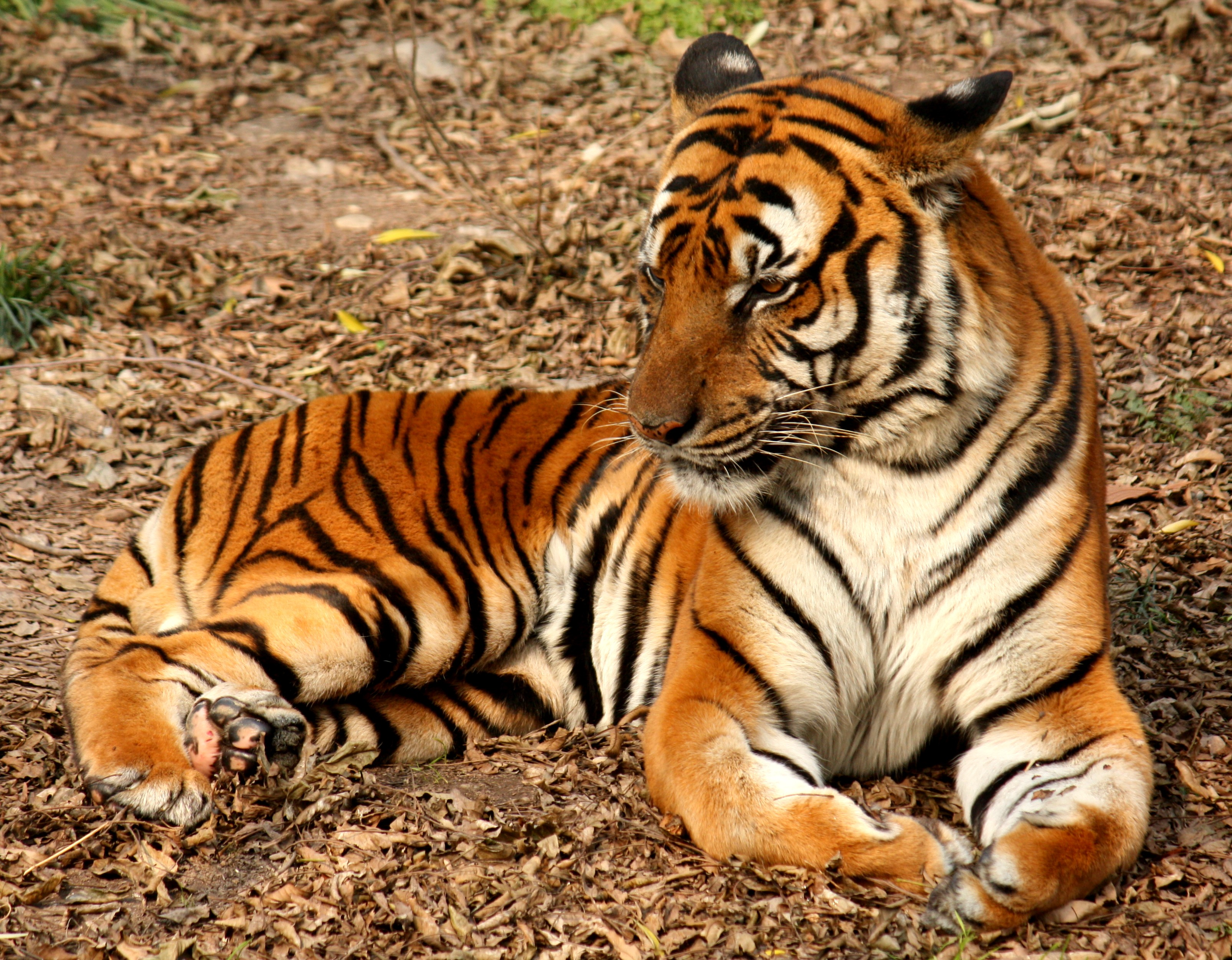
South China Tiger

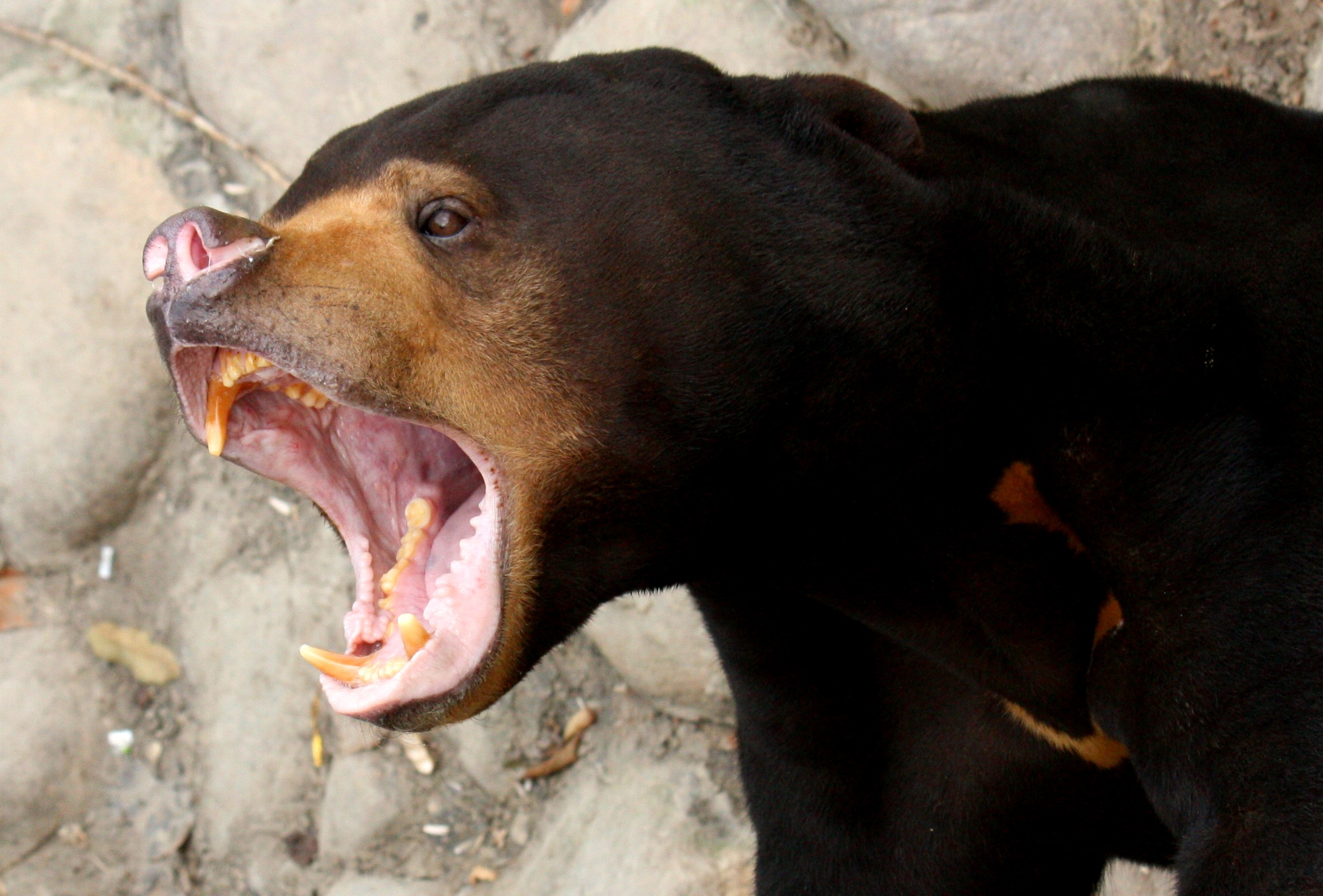
Sun bear

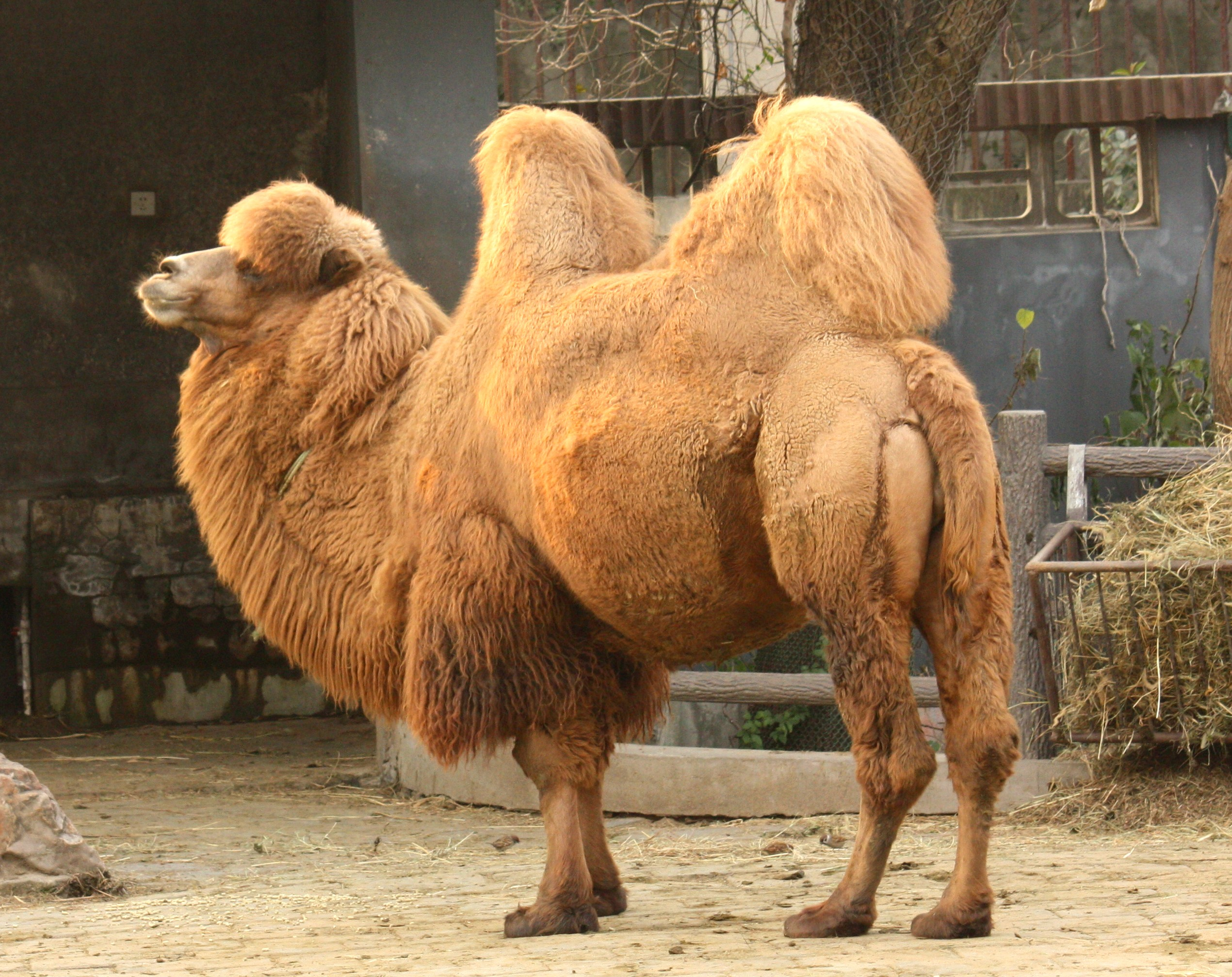
Camel

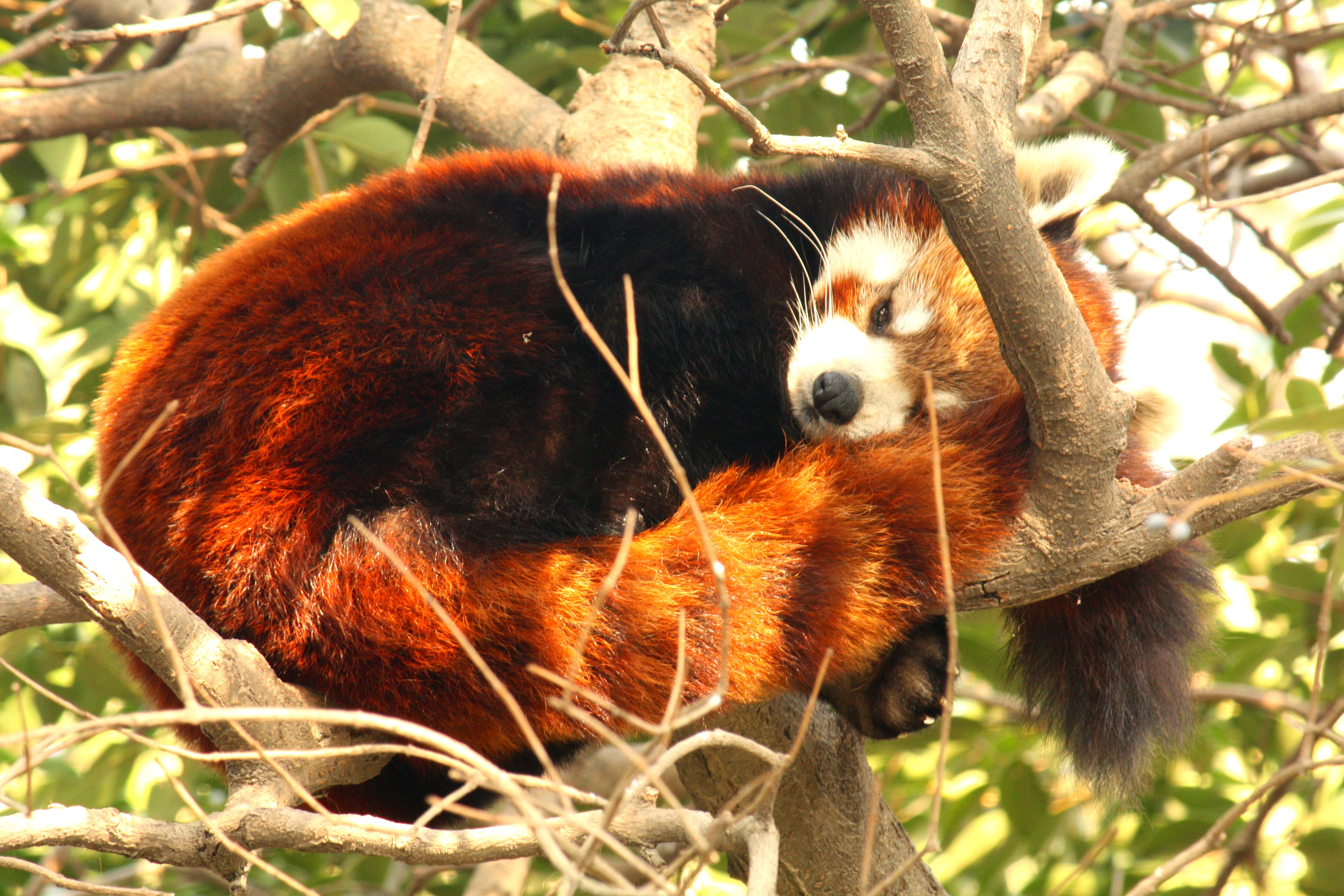
Red Panda

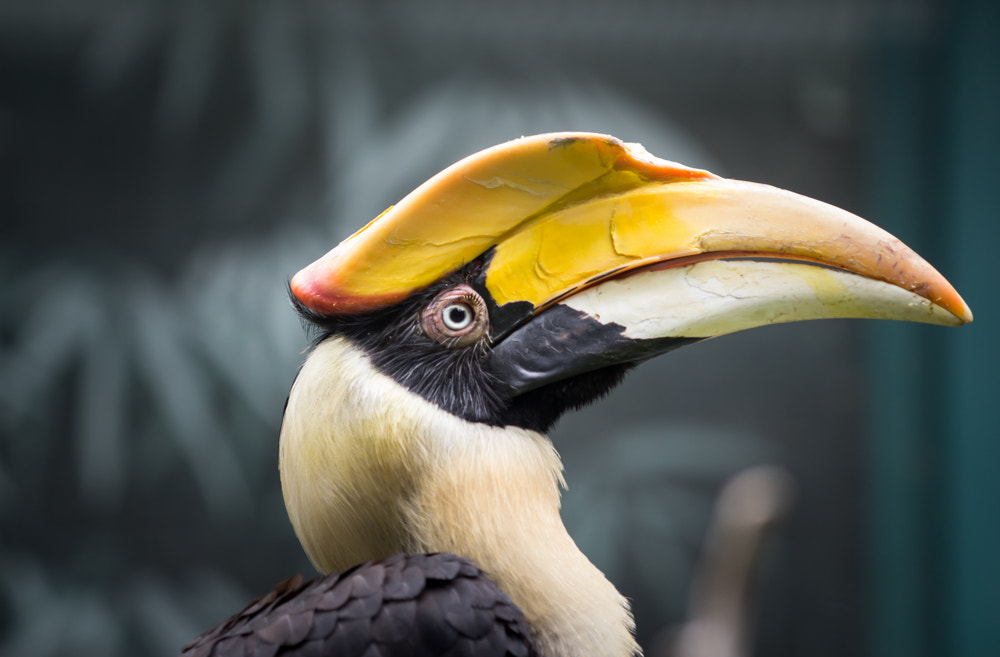
Great Pied Hornbill

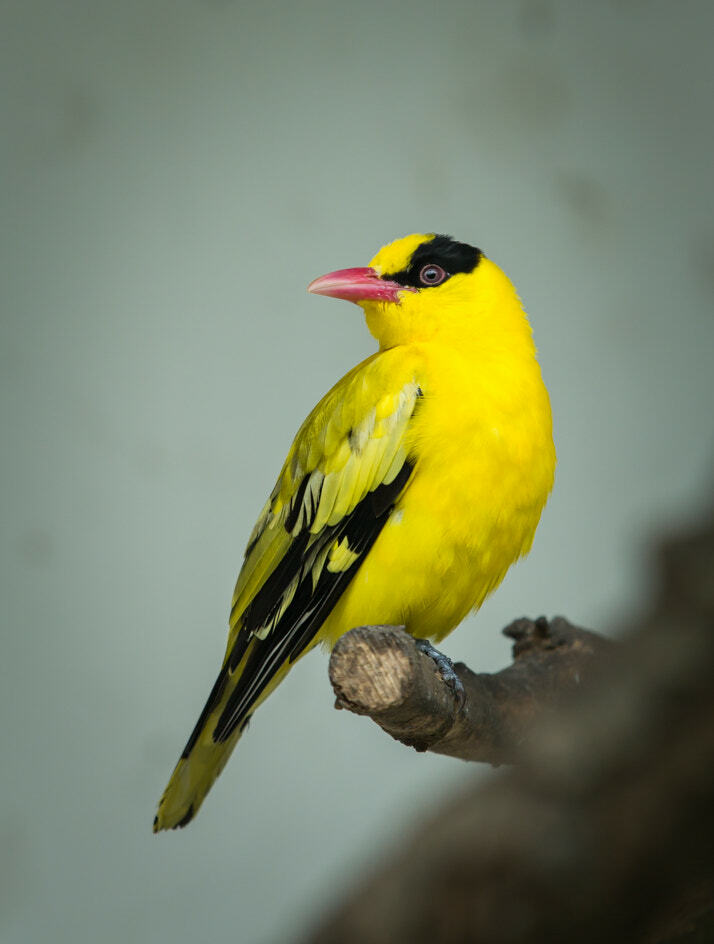
Black Naped Oriole

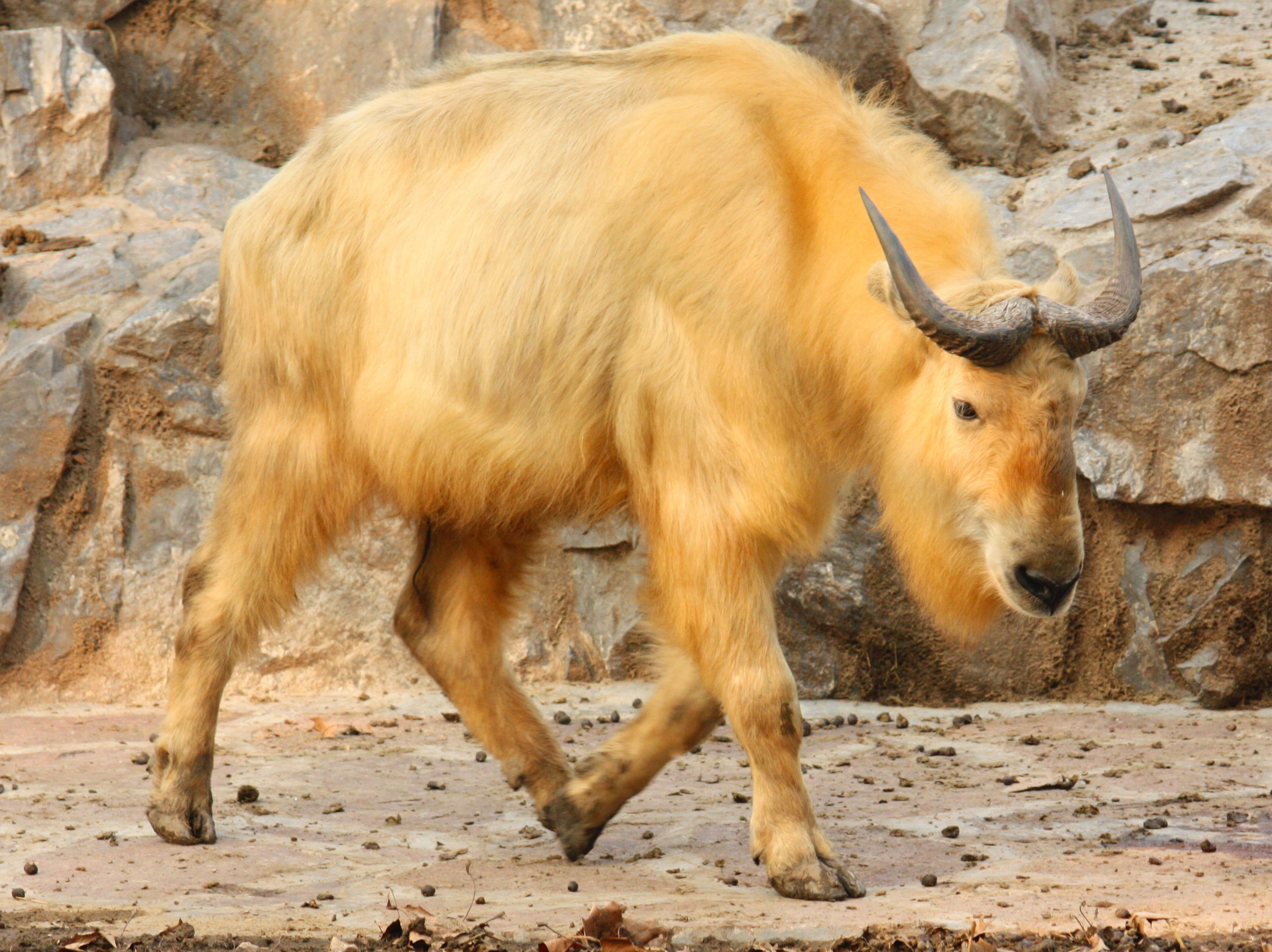
Golden takin

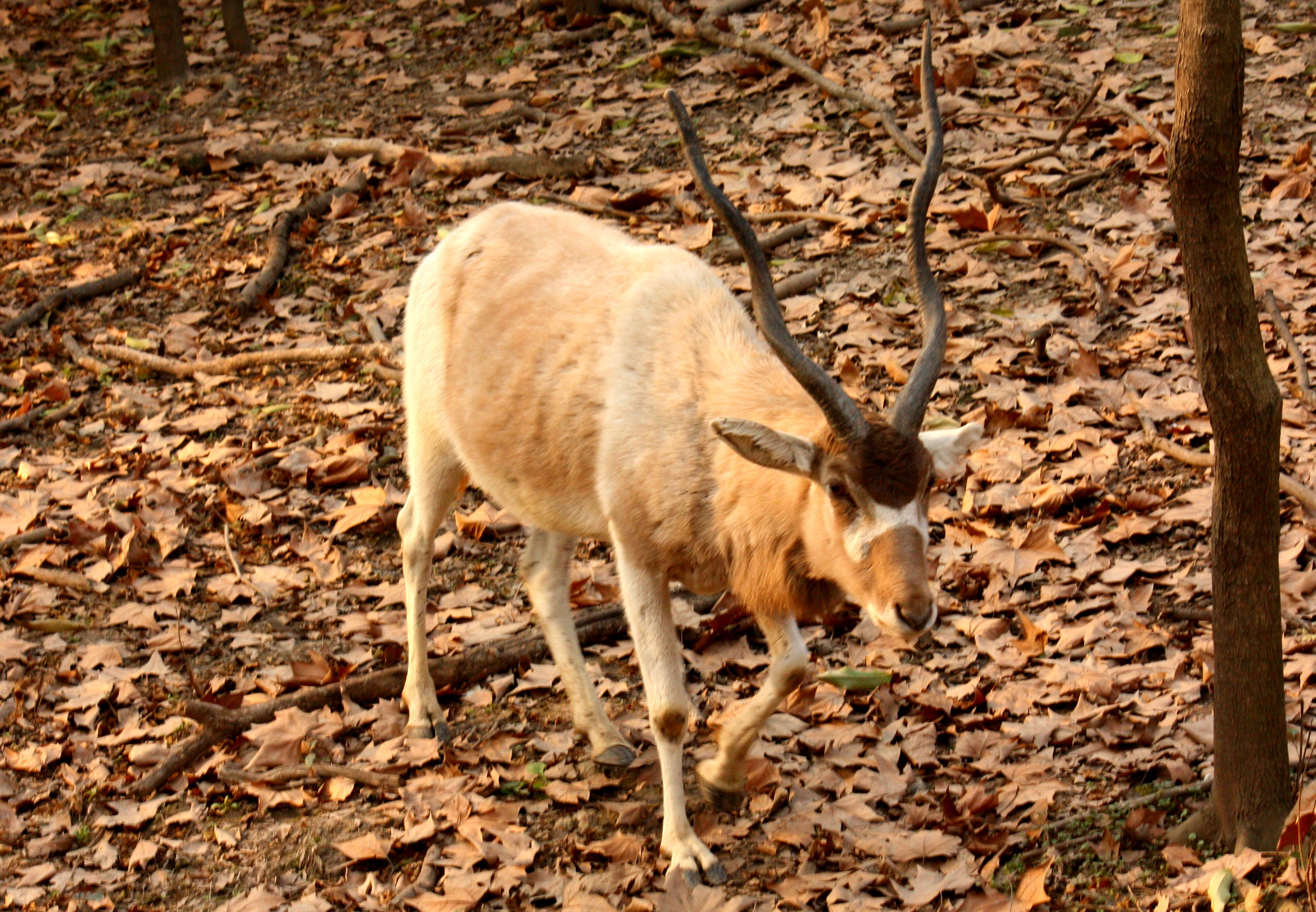
Addax

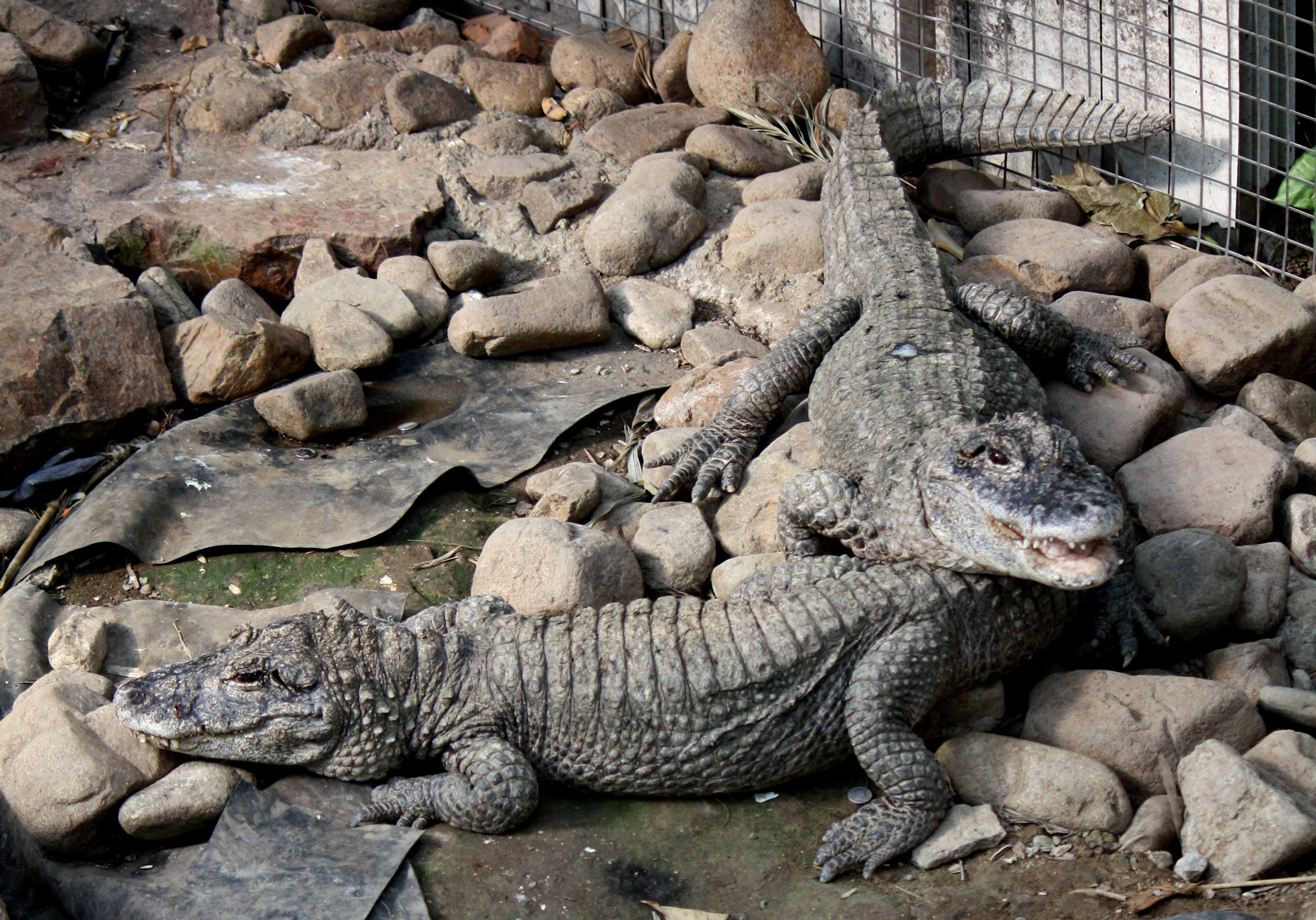
Chinese alligators

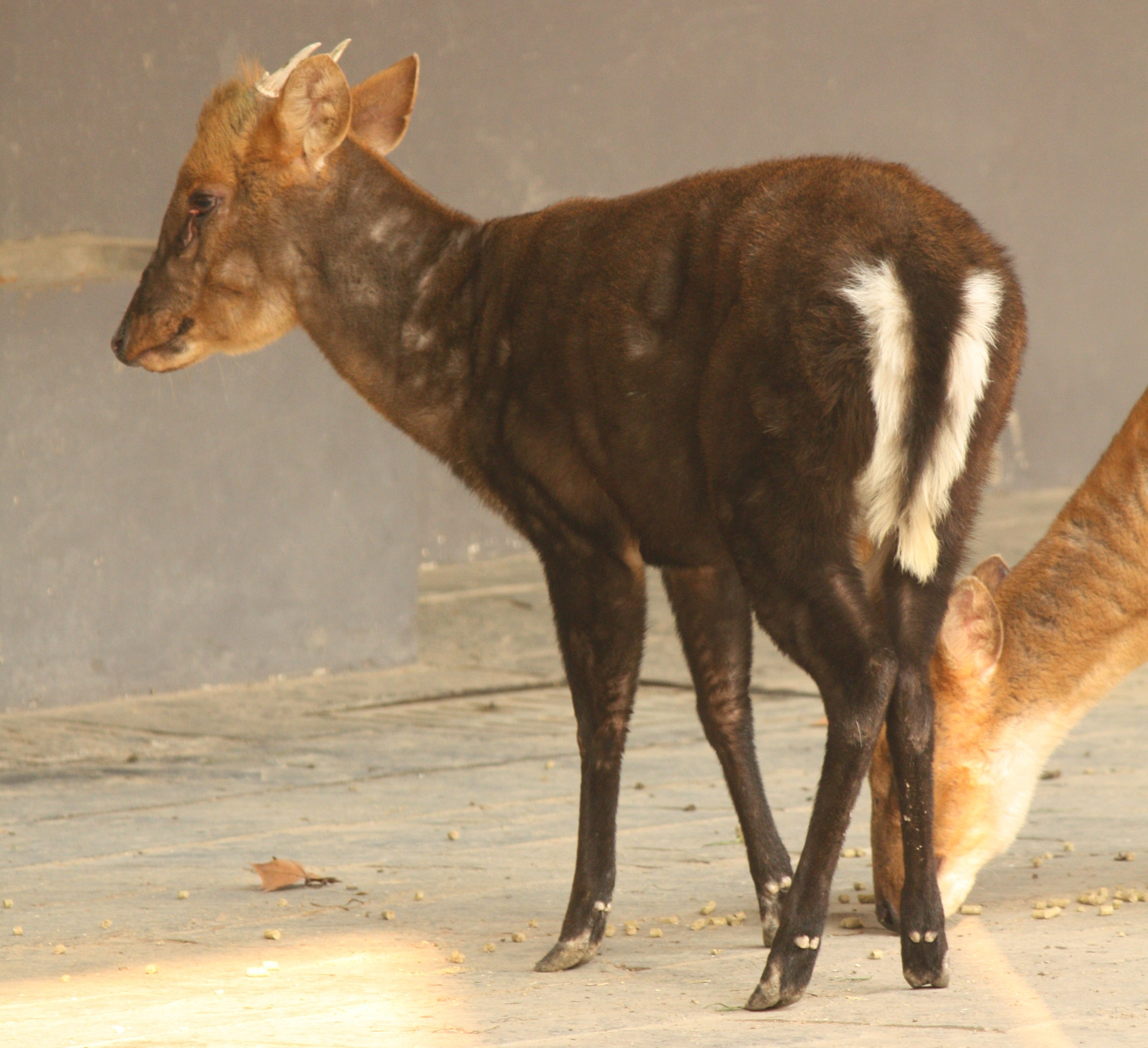
Black Muntjac

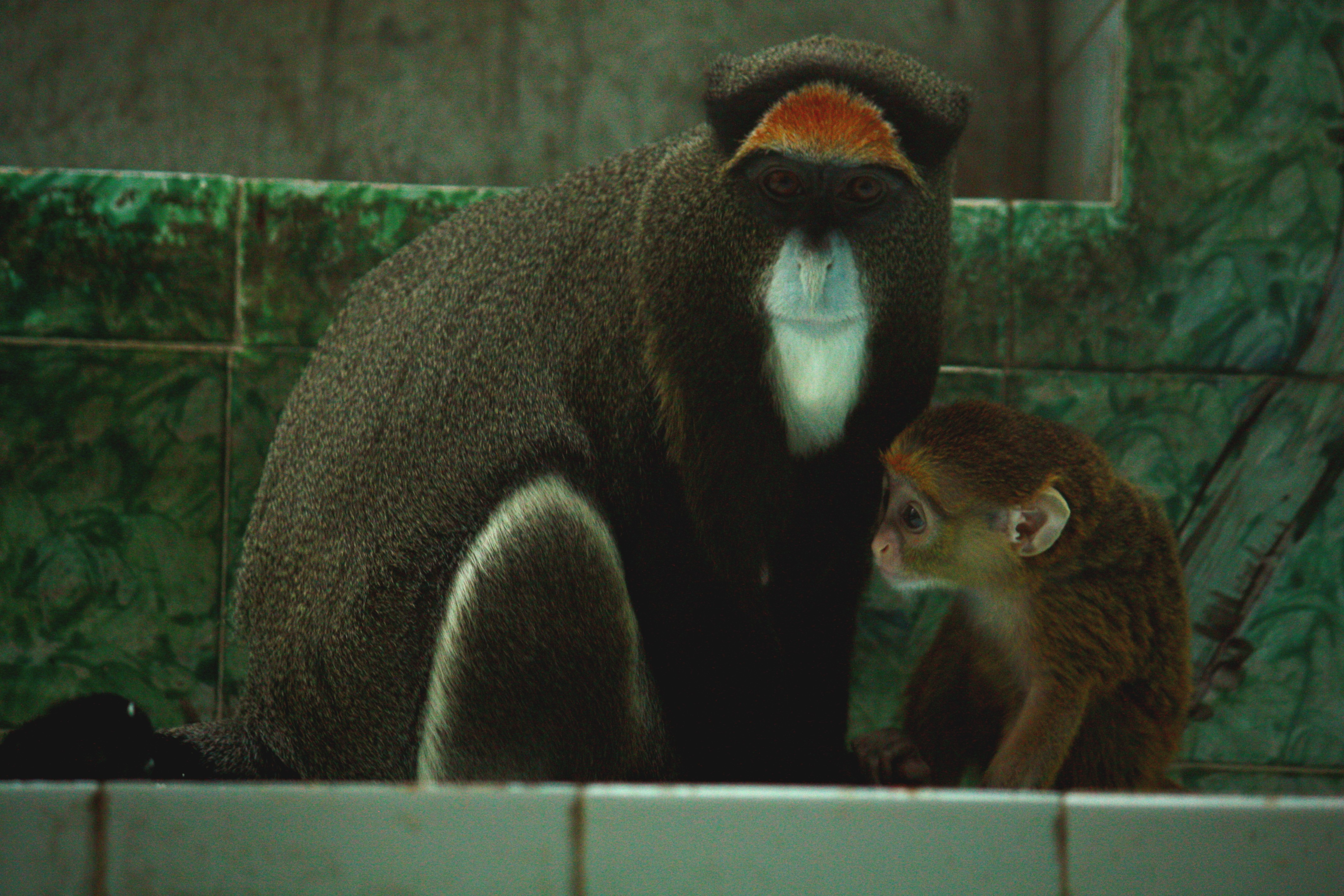
De Brazza's monkeys

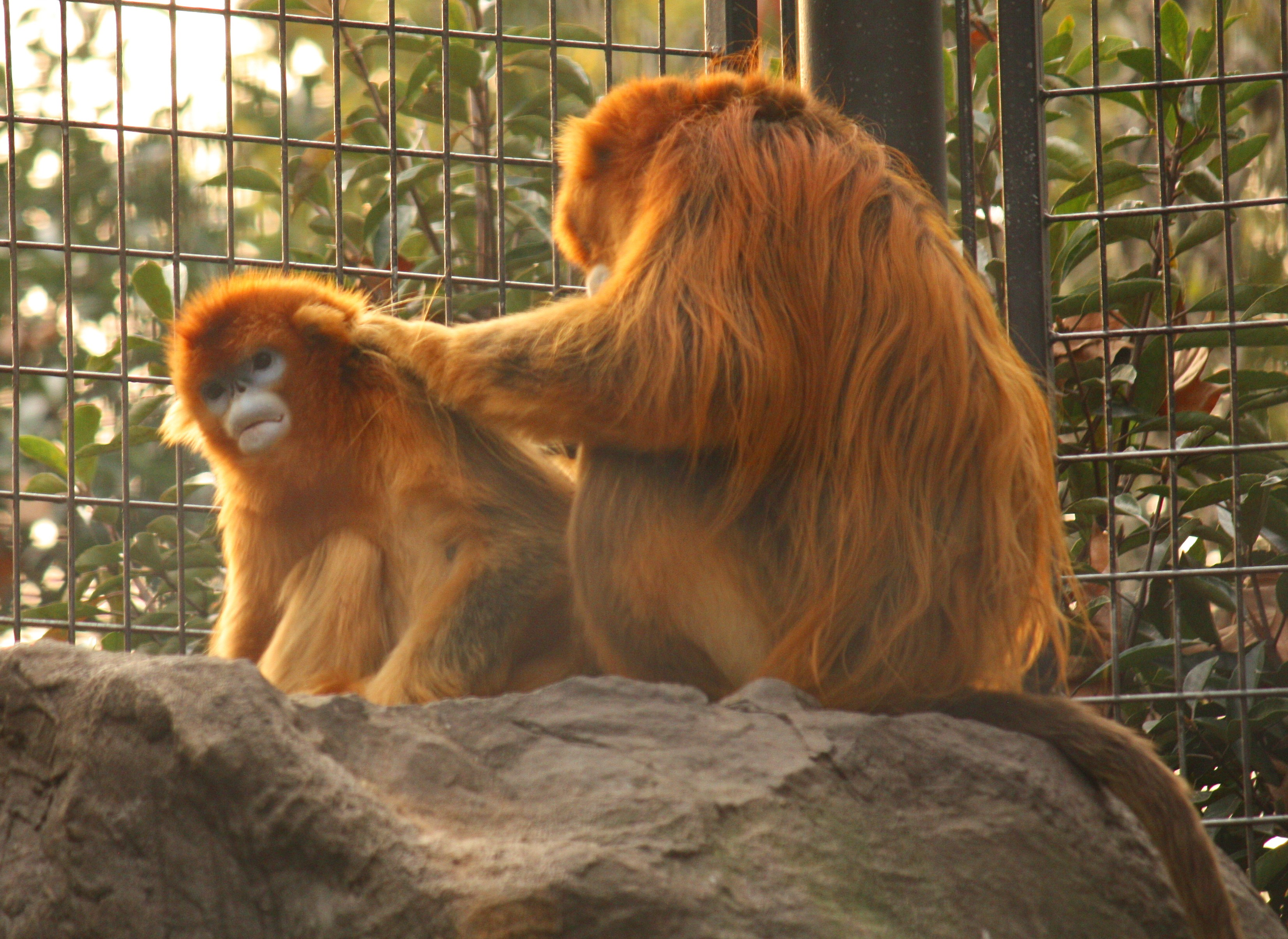
Golden snub-nosed monkeys
