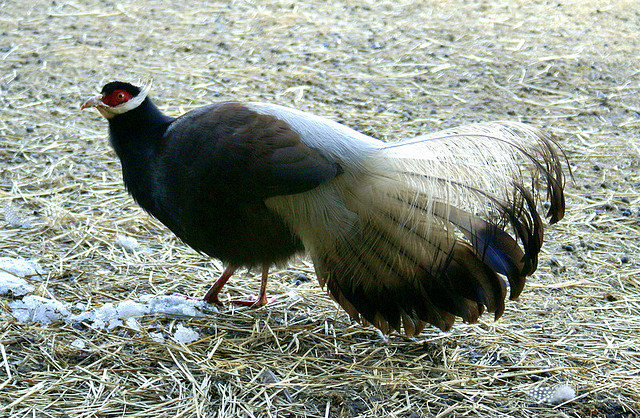

Conservation status
- Least Concern (IUCN 3.1)
- CITES Appendix I

Scientific classification
- Kingdom: Animalia
- Phylum: Chordata
- Class: Aves
- Order: Galliformes
- Family: Phasianidae
- Genus: Crossoptilon
- Species: C. mantchuricum

Binomial name
- Crossoptilon mantchuricum R. Swinhoe, 1863

= Brown eared pheasant =

Species of bird

The brown eared pheasant (Crossoptilon mantchuricum) is a large pheasant, 83–110 cm in length. The body is dark brown overall, with the head and neck black and bare bright red facial skin. Long, stiff white ear tufts emerge from the sides of the head, forming a bundle. Both sexes are similar in colouration. The species is endemic to the mountain forests of northern China.

It is similar to the blue eared pheasant (Crossoptilon auritum), but differs in having dark brown (rather than blue) body overall and white lower back and tail.

== Description ==
=== Measurements and shape ===
Measurements of Crossoptilon mantchuricum
Sex	Weight (g)	Length (mm)	Culmen length (mm)	Wing chord (mm)	Tail length (mm)	Tarsus length (mm)
Male	1650–2475	985–1074	41–42.5	270–312	518–582	92–101
Female	1450–2026	830–1050	37.5–42	265–290	447–576	89–97

=== Plumage ===
The crown feathers are velvety and dark brown, and the neck is also dark brown with a faint, narrow white band across the nape. The base of the forehead is white with black tips. The area behind the nostrils and the ear coverts are white. The ear feathers form stiff bundles that extend backward and project above the head and neck, resembling a pair of horns. The sides of the head are bare and bright red, covered with small wart-like bumps.

The upper back and shoulders are glossy brown, with feather tips loose and hair-like. The lower back, rump, upper tail coverts, and tail feathers are silvery white; the tail tips are black with a metallic purplish-blue sheen. The outermost two pairs of tail feathers have smooth, unfrayed vanes, while the next seven pairs have outer vanes that separate into long, hair-like filaments, slightly curved inward, with the inner vanes and tips remaining intact. The central two pairs of tail feathers are almost entirely filamentous except for a small intact, spoon-shaped tip. These two central feathers are raised higher than the rest, their filaments and tips drooping like a horse's tail and covering the remainder of the tail.

The upper wings are brown, with the flight feathers slightly paler and marked by dark brown shaft streaks. The chin and throat are white; the front of the neck is deep brown, gradually fading toward the rear, and the undertail coverts are brownish-grey.

The iris is orange-yellow to reddish-brown; the bill is pink; the legs and toes are coral red, and the claws are greyish. Males bear a spur on the tarsus.

== Taxonomy ==
The brown eared pheasant was first described by Robert Swinhoe in 1863, although an earlier informal mention dates back to 1841, referring to a specimen obtained through Dr. Lamprey at Tientsin, said to have come from Manchuria. It is known in Chinese as 褐马鸡(hè mǎ jī).

Molecular analyses indicate that the genus Crossoptilon is monophyletic within the family Phasianidae. Within the genus, the brown eared pheasant (C. mantchuricum) is most closely related to the blue eared pheasant (C. auritum), whereas the Tibetan eared pheasant (C. harmani) and the white eared pheasant (C. crossoptilon) form a separate clade. These two pairs together constitute sister groups within the genus.

The brown eared pheasant is monotypic, with no recognized subspecies.

== Habitat and Distribution ==
The brown eared pheasant is distributed in the Xiaowutai Mountains in northwestern Hebei, and in the northwestern Shanxi and Lüliang Mountains regions of China. It primarily inhabits low mountains and hilly areas below 2,500 meters above sea level. During summer and autumn, it prefers secondary mixed forests of conifers and broad-leaved trees or coniferous forests, while in winter it occupies lower-elevation broad-leaved farmland, forest edges, and shrublands. It is mainly terrestrial, favouring open spaces within forests or grasslands along forest edges, and roosts at night on pine or palm trees. It is endemic to China.

== Behaviour ==
Outside the breeding season, individuals form flocks beginning in early July, with populations reaching 20 to 60 birds by late September. Flocks have a clear hierarchy, led by a dominant, large male, with another fit bird acting as a sentinel. They spend most of the day foraging, with rest and dust bathing around midday, and generally follow fixed routes to feeding sites in loosely organized lines. When startled, the flock may disperse; the leader then regroups juveniles with adults, females with males, solitary birds with groups, and small groups into larger flocks. When fleeing, birds run uphill and only take flight upon reaching ridge tops, gliding down to valleys or opposite slopes.

=== Vocalizations ===
The brown-eared pheasant produces a variety of calls rather than true songs. Its common call is transcribed as "gu-ji" or "gu-gu", used for communication between individuals, including between parents and chicks. The alarm call is a repeated "ji-ji", while a rhythmic "gua-gua-gua" call is produced during courtship displays.

=== Diet ===
The brown eared pheasant feeds primarily on various plant materials, but also consumes a small amount of animal food, with its diet changing seasonally based on food availability.

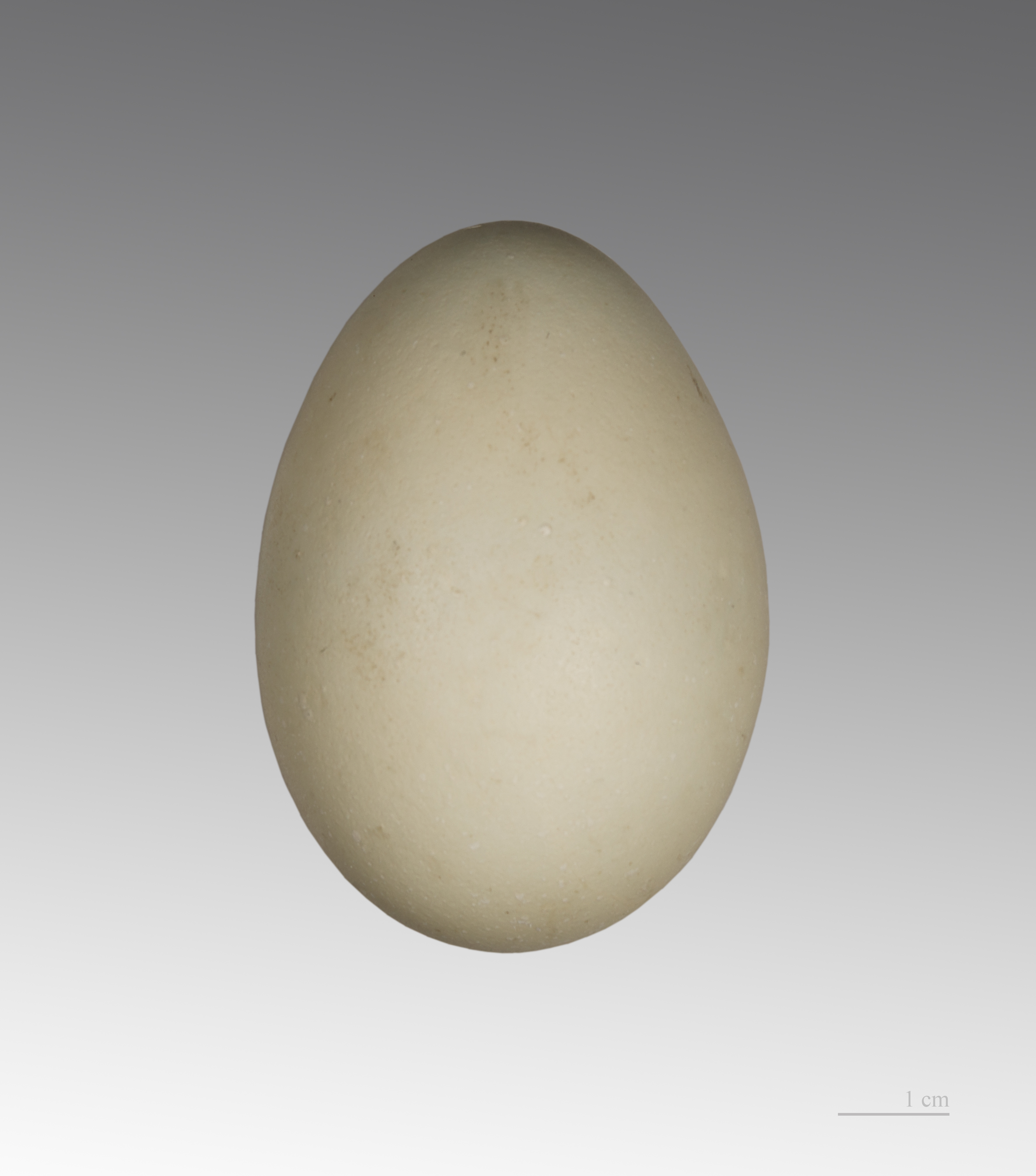
Crossoptilon mantchuricum

=== Reproduction ===
The breeding season of the brown eared pheasant lasts from April to June, with pair formation beginning in mid-March. During courtship, males emit a repeated "gua-gua-gua" call. In early April, pairs establish territories, and males and females forage and move together, showing mating behaviour.

Nests are typically built in mixed coniferous and broadleaf forests at elevations of 1,800–2,500 m. They are placed on the ground under cover or near the base of rocks or tree stumps. The nest is a simple bowl-shaped structure built in a ground depression, lined with grass leaves, twigs, and feathers. The nest measures about 28.6 (23–33) cm × 32.7 (28–40) cm, with a depth of 9.9 (8–14) cm.

The brown eared pheasant shows strong territorial behaviour, with each pair usually occupying one mountain slope and defending a territory of 0.7–1.3 ha. Males actively repel intruding conspecifics, sometimes engaging in physical fights until the rival withdraws.

Egg-laying begins in early April. Each clutch contains 4–17 eggs, most commonly 6–9, laid at 1–2-day intervals. The eggs are oval, pale brown, bluish-green, or whitish, smooth and unspotted, measuring on average 59.9 (54.9–63.7) mm × 43.8 (42.7–46.8) mm, and weighing 58.8 (54.8–63.4) g. Incubation begins once the clutch is complete and is carried out by the female alone, while the male remains nearby to guard the nest. The incubation period lasts 26–27 days.

The chicks are precocial, leaving the nest on the second day after hatching and following the parents to forage.
