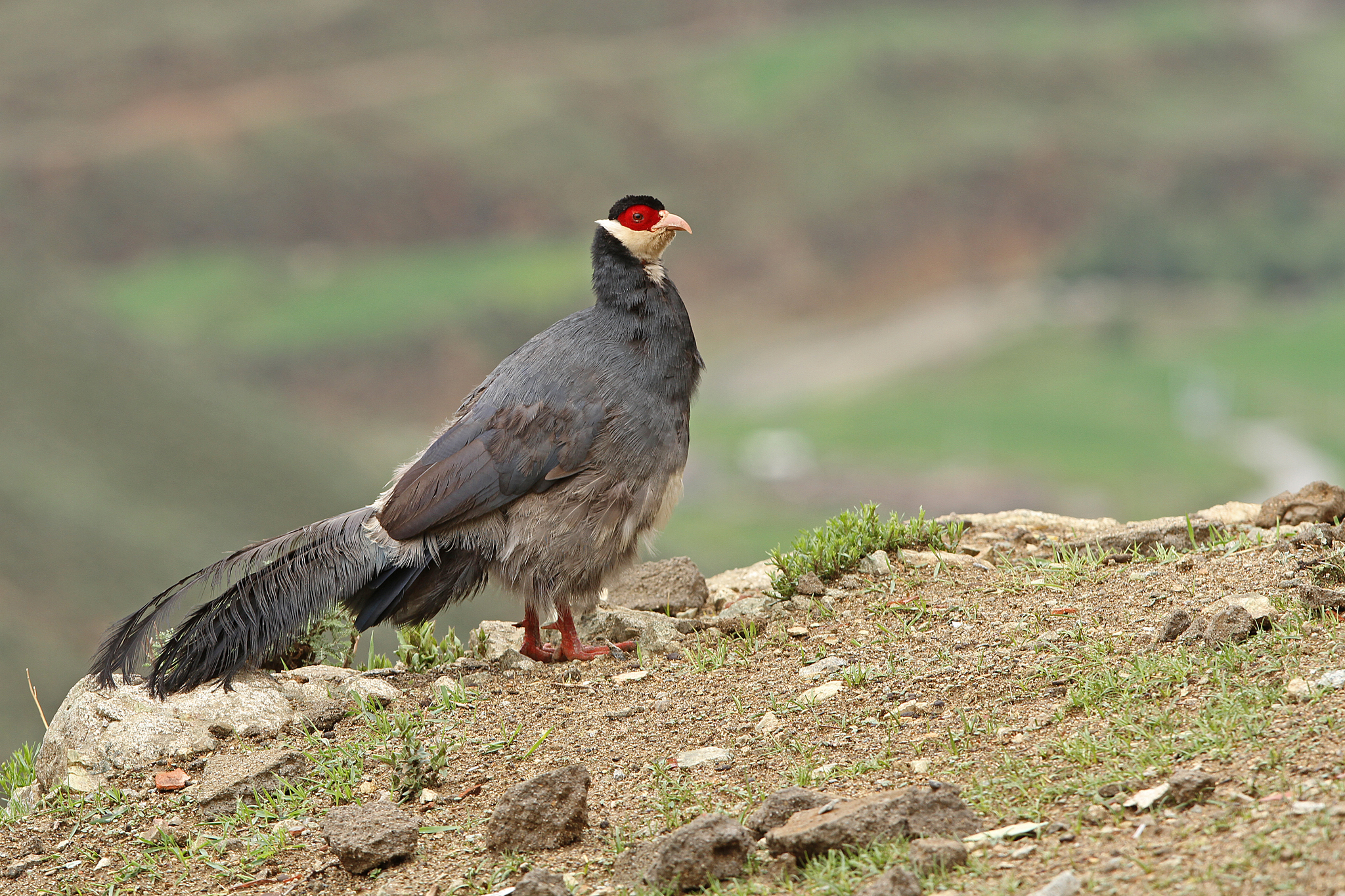

Conservation status
- Least Concern (IUCN 3.1)

Scientific classification
- Kingdom: Animalia
- Phylum: Chordata
- Class: Aves
- Order: Galliformes
- Family: Phasianidae
- Genus: Crossoptilon
- Species: C. harmani

Binomial name
- Crossoptilon harmani Elwes, 1881

= Tibetan eared pheasant =

Species of bird

The Tibetan eared pheasant (Crossoptilon harmani), also called Elwes' eared pheasant, is a species of bird in the family Phasianidae found in southeast Tibet and adjacent northern India, usually between 3,000 and 5,000 m (9,800 and 16,400 ft) elevation, but has been seen down to 2,280 m (7,500 ft) in winter. The species is named after Henry John Harman.

Their natural habitats are boreal and temperate forests. Seen in bushy and grassy clearings, rhododendron thickets, and tall dense scrub in valleys, these birds are threatened by habitat destruction and hunting. They form monogamous pair bonds in the spring. Their eggs are laid from May to July, and incubated by the females.

== Description ==
The Tibetan eared pheasant shares many characteristics, such as the short ears and the droopy tail, with the white eared pheasant (C. crossoptilon), as well as having similar calls and hybridising with it in the Salween Valley, so the two may be conspecific. The Tibetan eared pheasant grows to a length between 75 and 85 cm (30 and 33 in), with females being slightly smaller than males. The sexes are similar. The beak is reddish-brown, the irises yellowish-orange, and the bare facial skin is red, as are the legs. The head is topped with a crown of black, dense, short feathers, on either side of which are short, nonprojecting ear tufts. The rest of the head and nape and a thin collar are white. The rest of the body, wings, and tail are bluish-grey, the mantle, neck and breast being of a darker shade, whereas the lower back, rump, upper tail coverts, and belly are paler whitish-grey. The wings are blackish-brown and the tail bluish-black.

== Distribution and habitat ==
Their range is restricted to Tibet, northern India, and northern Bhutan. Their typical habitat is dense scrubby areas in river valleys, grassy hillsides, and the verges of both coniferous and deciduous woodlands. Although sometimes found at elevations as low as 2,400 m (7,900 ft), they usually occur between about 3,000 and 5,000 m (9,800 and 16,400 ft).

== Ecology ==
These pheasants usually form groups of up to 10 individuals. They feed on the ground, foraging through the plant debris and grasses near woodland edges and among the rhododendron and juniper scrub. In areas where they are hunted, they may be elusive, retreating into the undergrowth or flying off downhill when scared, but where unmolested, can be quite bold. The birds are believed to be monogamous, with breeding taking place between May and July. One nest was discovered under a fallen tree trunk; it was made from bark and pulp with a mossy lining. The female seems to be solely responsible for incubating the eggs, but both sexes have been observed feeding the chicks.

== Status ==
The IUCN has assessed the C. harmani as Least-Concern. The population is suspected to be stable. Very locally, hunting and overgrazing may be threats, but the vast majority of this species' range is undisturbed and remote from plausible threats. In a recent attempt to model the impact of climate change on the extent of suitable habitat, Li et al. (2023) found that in no modelled scenario did the area of suitable habitat for this species contract.
