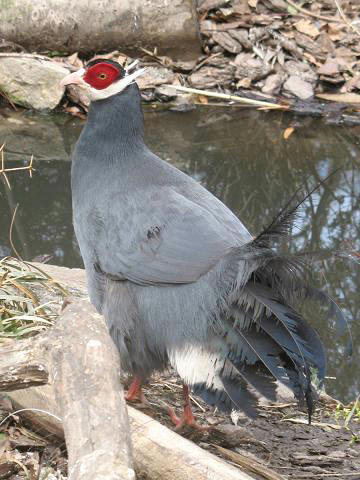
- Blue eared pheasant (Crossoptilon auritum)

Scientific classification
- Kingdom: Animalia
- Phylum: Chordata
- Class: Aves
- Order: Galliformes
- Family: Phasianidae
- Tribe: Phasianini
- Genus: Crossoptilon; Hodgson, 1838

Type species
- Phasianus crossoptilon (Hodgson), 1838

= Eared pheasant =

Genus of birds

Eared pheasants are pheasants from the genus Crossoptilon in the family Phasianidae.

== Species ==
Established by Brian Houghton Hodgson in 1838, the genus contains four species:

Image	Name	Common name	Distribution
	Crossoptilon crossoptilon	White eared pheasant	China, Qinghai, Sichuan, Yunnan, and Tibet
	Crossoptilon harmani	Tibetan eared pheasant	southeast Tibet and adjacent northern India
	Crossoptilon mantchuricum	Brown eared pheasant	northeastern China (Shanxi and nearby provinces)
	Crossoptilon auritum	Blue eared pheasant	central China

The name Crossoptilon is a combination of the Greek words krossoi, meaning "fringe" and ptilon, meaning "feather"—a name Hodgson felt particularly applied to the white eared pheasant "distinguished amongst all its congeners by its ample fringe-like plumage, the dishevelled quality of which is communicated even to the central tail feathers". All are large, sexually monomorphic and found in China.
