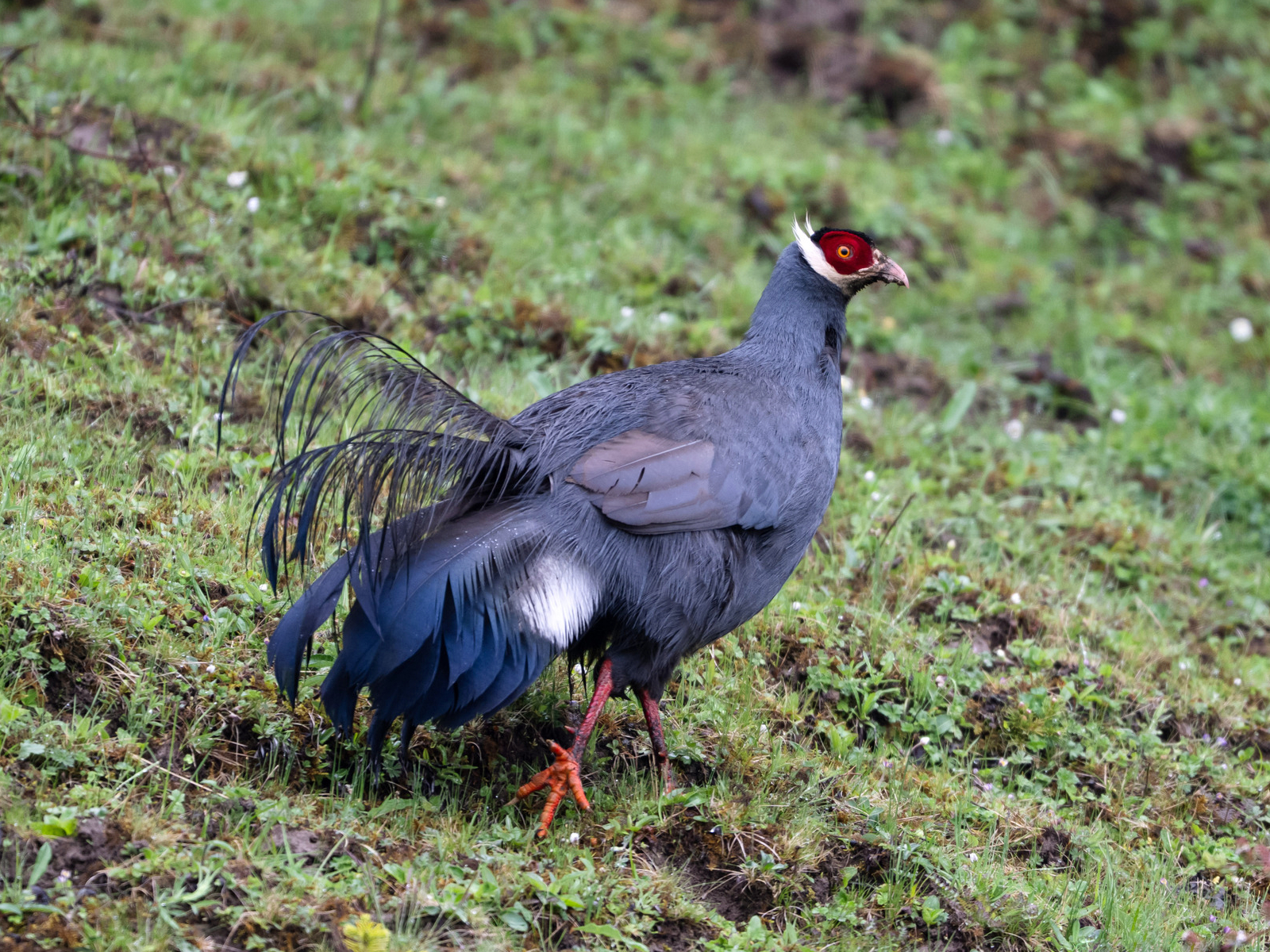
- In Songpan County, Sichuan, China

Conservation status
- Least Concern (IUCN 3.1)

Scientific classification
- Kingdom: Animalia
- Phylum: Chordata
- Class: Aves
- Order: Galliformes
- Family: Phasianidae
- Genus: Crossoptilon
- Species: C. auritum

Binomial name
- Crossoptilon auritum (Pallas, 1811)

= Blue eared pheasant =

Species of bird

The blue eared pheasant (Crossoptilon auritum), also sometimes hyphenated as blue eared-pheasant, is a large pheasant endemic to China. Although it is considered rare, the blue eared pheasant is evaluated as of least concern.

== Description ==
The blue eared pheasant is around 96 cm (38 in) long (including the 49–56 cm (19–22 in) tail); males weigh 1700–2110 g, and females 1450–1880 g. It has dark blue-grey plumage with velvet black crown, red facial wattles of bare skin surrounding the eyes, yellow iris, long white ear coverts below and behind the eyes, a pale pink bill, and crimson legs. Its tail of 24 elongated bluish-grey feathers is curved, loose, and dark-tipped, with the outer five pairs of tail feathers having a white base. Both sexes have similar plumage, though the male is slightly larger, and has short spurs on the legs.

== Distribution ==
The blue eared pheasant is found in the mountain forests of central China, preferring juniper scrub in alpine meadows at 2700–4400 m altitude. Its range is to the northeast of the closely related white eared pheasant C. crossoptilon, and southwest of the brown eared pheasant C. mantchuricum.

== Ecology ==
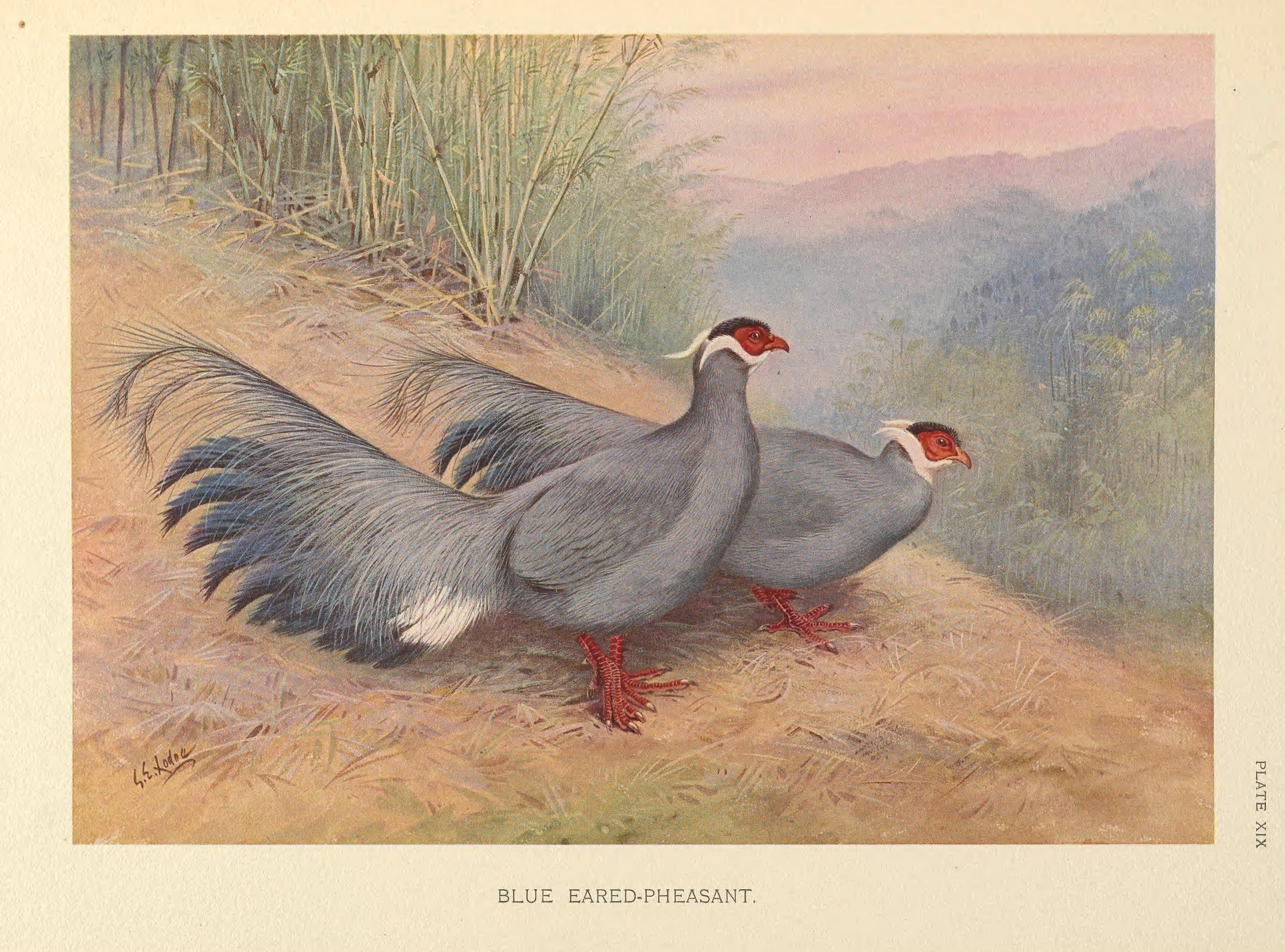
Colour plate from 1918 of the blue eared pheasant

Its diet consists mainly (about 80%) of berries and vegetable matter; the remaining 20% being insects, particularly beetles.

== See also ==
- List of endangered and protected species of China
