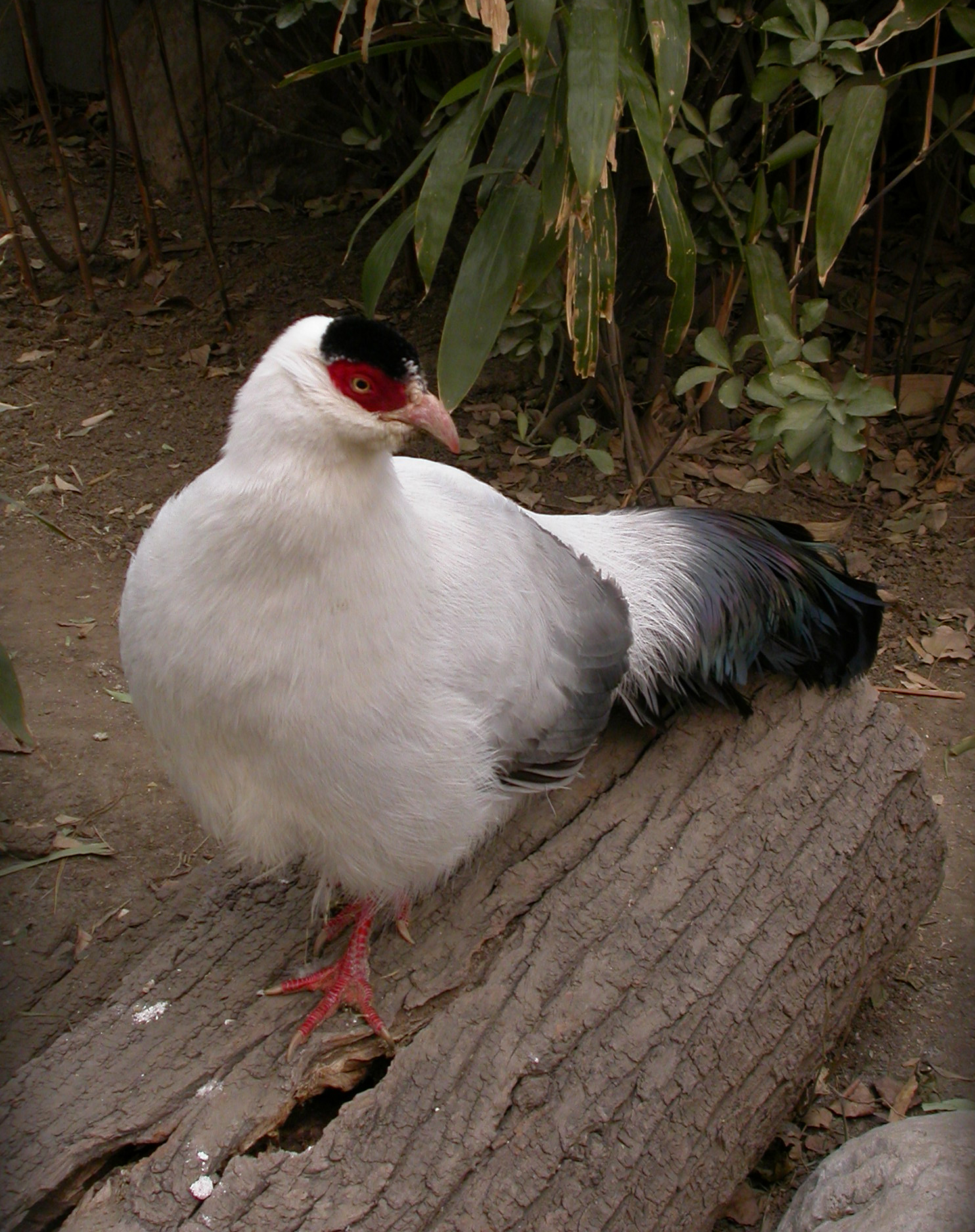
- At Beijing Zoo, China

Conservation status
- Least Concern (IUCN 3.1)
- CITES Appendix I

Scientific classification
- Kingdom: Animalia
- Phylum: Chordata
- Class: Aves
- Order: Galliformes
- Family: Phasianidae
- Genus: Crossoptilon
- Species: C. crossoptilon

Binomial name
- Crossoptilon crossoptilon (Hodgson, 1838)

Audio

= White eared pheasant =

Species of bird

The white eared pheasant (Crossoptilon crossoptilon), also known as Dolan's eared pheasant or Bee's pheasant, is a species of "eared pheasant" that get its name because its colouration is white and has the prominent ear tufts of the genus, not because it has white ears. The indigenous people of Himalaya call it shagga, meaning snow fowl. This gregarious bird lives in large flocks, foraging on alpine meadows close to or above the snowline throughout the year. C. crossoptilon is found in China (Qinghai, Sichuan, Yunnan, and Tibet) where it tends to inhabit mixed forests and can be found around Buddhist monasteries.

== Flight ==
White eared pheasants tend to fly a great deal more than their close relatives, such as the brown eared pheasant (C. mantchuricum) and the blue eared pheasant (C. auritum). All three species are capable of hovering or volplaning over deep snow, with the aid of their great, wide tails. Eared pheasants move across deep snow by whirring their wings and fluttering close to the ground, and supporting their weight on their rectrices. Eared pheasant flight was often described as poor by the hunter collectors of the 18th century, who used dogs to flush the birds from the ground for shooting. Eared pheasants do not waste their energy on flying when quadrupeds prey on them because they have adapted many defensive escape behaviors that do not require flight. They have a high aptitude for sustained flight — movements that only take them a few hundred yards at a time, but in the snowy seasons this is very useful. This ability to cover large distances by flight is reminiscent of ptarmigans, sage grouse, and Syrmaticus pheasants, all of which inhabit snowy regions and use sustained flight for feeding during winter. Characteristic of these species and C. crossoptilon is the lack of a prominent tailing wing notch.

== Diet ==
C. crossoptilon forages for tubers and roots in alpine meadows, often in the company of yaks or other hoofed stock. In winter, the white eared pheasant subsists on pine needles, juniper berries, wolf berries, and the desiccated seed pods of iris, lily, and allium. When hard-pressed during the most severe winter storms, which may blow for weeks at a time, eared pheasants may subsist upon pine pitch and deer, rabbit, and yak dung.

== Subspecies ==
While all known forms of white eared pheasant are very similar in phenotype, behavioral and genetic differences suggest much is available to learn about their systematic and behavioral ecology.

The Szechuan white eared pheasant, (C. c. crossoptilon), is a galliform bird native to the Sichuan (Szechuan) region of China. It is a subspecies of white eared pheasant. This form inhabits high altitudes along exposed rockscapes and may descend to old-growth forests in winter. Its wings are dark-grey or violet.

This bird is predominantly white, including, as its name suggests, white ear tuffs, but is not as white in as many places of its body as its close relatives, the Tibetan white eared pheasant (C. c. drouyni) and the Yunnan white eared pheasant (C. c. lichiangnse). It has black tail feathers and wingtips, and a patch of black at the top of its head. The primary feathers range from dark grey to brown. The part of its face not covered by feathers has red skin.

== Reproduction ==
The Szechuan white eared pheasant will not mate until it is two years old, then it will go into a heated breeding frenzy around the end of April. The breeding lasts until June and these pheasants usually produce four to seven eggs per clutch. The incubation period for eggs is 24–25 days.

Although not much sexual dimorphism exists among the Szechuan white eared pheasant, the cocks are considerably larger than the hens. They can reach a length of 86–96 cm and weigh 1400–2050 g for females and 2350–2750 g for males.

== Conservation status ==
The white eared pheasant is listed as Least Concern by the IUCN. It is threatened by habitat loss and hunting, though neither appear to be significant enough to cause population declines. The population is unknown, but best guesses place it in the tens or hundreds of thousands.

== See also ==
- List of endangered and protected species of China
