= List of Galliformes by population =

This is a list of Galliformes species by global population. While numbers are estimates, they have been made by the experts in their fields. For more information on how these estimates were ascertained, see Wikipedia's articles on population biology and population ecology.

Not all Galliformes have had their populations quantified, but species without population estimates are included in a secondary table below.

The IOC World Bird List (version 15.1) recognizes 307 species of Galliformes, one of which is extinct. As of January 2026, the IUCN has assessed 303 of these species (excepting red grouse, chestnut-headed chachalaca, Yungas guan, and Dulit partridge).

This list follows IUCN classifications for species names and taxonomy. Where IUCN classifications differ from other ornithological authorities, alternative names and taxonomies are noted.

One member of Galliformes is extinct:

- New Zealand quail (Coturnix novaezelandiae) - last individual died in 1875.

== Species by global population ==
Common name	Binomial name	Population	Status	Trend	Notes	Image
Vietnam pheasant (Edward's pheasant)	Lophura edwardsi	0-49	CR	?	May be extinct in the wild. Last confirmed records are from 2000. Note that the Vietnamese pheasant (L.e. hatinhensis) was once considered a separate species, but is now treated as a subspecies by both the IOC and IUCN/BirdLife International.	
Himalayan quail	Ophrysia superciliosa	1-49	CR	?		
Manipur bush quail	Perdicula manipurensis	1-200	CR	?	No confirmed sightings since 1932, with unconfirmed reports from 1998 and 2006.	
Sira curassow	Pauxi koepckeae	50-400	CR	▼	Best estimate for number of mature individuals in 90-250.	
Alagoas curassow	Mitu mitu	140	EW	N/A	Total world population now held in two aviaries; only ~100 individuals are completely M.mitu, with the rest being hybrids (M. mitu × M. tuberosum).	
Trinidad piping guan	Pipile pipile	150-330	CR	▲	Total population is estimated to be 250-500 individuals.	
White-winged guan	Penelope albipennis	200	EN	Steady	Total population is estimated to be 300 individuals.	
Djibouti spurfowl	Pternistis ochropectus	200-500	CR	▼	Total population is estimated to be 300-750 individuals.	
Tongan scrubfowl (Tongan megapode)	Megapodius pritchardii	250-999	VU	▲		
Red-knobbed curassow (Red-billed curassow)	Crax blumenbachii	480	EN	▼		
Horned guan	Oreophasis derbianus	600-1,700	EN	▼	Total population is estimated to be 1,000-2,499 individuals.	
Tanimbar scrubfowl (Tanimbar megapode)	Megapodius tenimberensis	670-6,700	VU	▼	Total population is estimated to be 1,000-10,000 individuals.	
Mount Cameroon spurfowl	Pternistis camerunensis	700-1,500	EN	▼	Total population is estimated to be 1,000-3,000 individuals.	
Nicobar scrubfowl (Nicobar megapode)	Megapodius nicobariensis	750-1,500	VU	Steady		
Hainan peacock-pheasant	Polyplectron katsumatae	800-2,000	EN	▼	Preliminary estimate.	
Malaysian crested argus	Rheinardia nigrescens	900-3,000	NT	Steady	Best estimate for number of mature individuals is 1,100-2,000.	
Waigeo brushturkey	Aepypodius bruijnii	977	EN	▼	Minimum estimate. Total population is estimated to be 1,400 individuals.	
Wattled curassow	Crax globulosa	1,000-2,499	EN	▼	Total population is estimated to be 2,400 individuals.	
Cauca guan	Penelope perspicax	1,000-2,499	VU	▼		
Swierstra's spurfowl	Pternistis swierstrai	1,000-2,499	VU	▼		
Horned curassow	Pauxi unicornis	1,000-4,999	EN	▼		
Blue-knobbed curassow (Blue-billed curassow)	Crax alberti	1,000-5,500	CR	▼	Best estimate for number of mature individuals in 1,250-3,100.	
Chestnut-bellied guan	Penelope ochrogaster	1,000-15,000	VU	▼	Total population is estimated to be 1,723-21,827 individuals.	
Tacarcuna wood quail	Odontophorus dialeucos	1,400	LC	Steady	Total population is estimated to be 2,118 individuals.	
Black-fronted piping guan	Pipile jacutinga	1,500-7,000	EN	▼	Total population is estimated to be 2,500-9,999 individuals.	
Ocellated quail	Cyrtonyx ocellatus	1,500-7,000	VU	▼	Total population is estimated to be 2,500-9,999 individuals.	
Rufous-headed chachalaca	Ortalis erythroptera	1,500-7,000	VU	▼	Total population is estimated to be 2,500-9,999 individuals.	
Gunnison grouse (Gunnison sage-grouse)	Centrocercus minimus	1,770-8,400	EN	▼		
Bearded guan	Penelope barbata	1,800-6,500	NT	▼	Total population is estimated to be 2,770-9,650 individuals.	
Udzungwa forest partridge	Xenoperdix udzungwensis	2,000-2,700	EN	▼	Total population is estimated to be 3,000-4,000 individuals.	
Malayan peacock-pheasant	Polyplectron malacense	2,500-9,999	EN	▼	Estimate is outdated, and does not rely on a density estimate.	
Hainan partridge	Arborophila ardens	2,500-9,999	VU	▼		
Sichuan partridge	Arborophila rufipectus	2,500-9,999	VU	▼		
Cheer pheasant	Catreus wallichi	2,500-9,999	VU	▼		
Gorgeted wood quail	Odontophorus strophium	2,500-9,999	VU	▼	Total population is estimated to be 5,900 individuals.	
Mrs. Hume's pheasant	Syrmaticus humiae	2,500-9,999	VU	▼	Best estimate for number of mature individuals is 7,500.	
Reeves's pheasant	Syrmaticus reevesii	2,500-9,999	VU	▼	Total population is estimated to be 3,500-15,000 individuals.	
Blyth's tragopan	Tragopan blythii	2,500-9,999	VU	▼	Total population is estimate to be 3,500-15,000 individuals.	
Cabot's tragopan	Tragopan caboti	2,500-9,999	VU	▼	Total population is estimated to be 3,500-15,000 individuals.	
Congo peafowl	Afropavo congensis	2,500-9,999	NT	▼	Total population is estimated to be 3,500-15,000 individuals.	
Biak scrubfowl	Megapodius geelvinkianus	2,500-9,999	NT	▼	Best estimate for number of mature individuals is 4,950.	
Orange-necked partridge	Arborophila davidi	2,500-9,999	NT	▼	Total population is estimated to be 10,000 individuals.	
Mountain peacock-pheasant	Polyplectron inopinatum	2,500-20,000	NT	▼	Best estimate for number of mature individuals is 2,500-9,999.	
Micronesian scrubfowl (Micronesian megapode)	Megapodius laperouse	2,600-15,400	NT	?	Best estimate for number of mature individuals is 4,500.	
Western tragopan	Tragopan melanocephalus	3,200-9,500	VU	▼		
Swinhoe's pheasant	Lophura swinhoii	3,300-6,700	NT	▼	Total population is estimated to be 5,000-10,000 individuals.	
Chestnut-headed partridge	Arborophila cambodiana	3,500-12,000	NT	▼		
Helmeted curassow	Pauxi pauxi	3,500-12,500	VU	▼		
Bearded wood partridge	Dendrortyx barbatus	3,600	VU	▼	Total population is estimated to be less than 5,400 individuals.	
White-faced partridge (Grey-breasted partridge)	Arborophila orientalis	4,000-20,000	VU	▼	Best estimate for number of mature individuals is 10,000-20,000.	
Brown eared-pheasant	Crossoptilon mantchuricum	5,000-15,000	LC	Steady		
Vanuatu scrubfowl (Vanuatu megapode)	Megapodius layardi	5,000-20,000	LC	▼		
Bornean peacock-pheasant	Polyplectron schleiermacheri	5,000-25,000	EN	▼		
Dusky scrubfowl (Dusky megapode)	Megapodius freycinet	5,000-100,000	LC	▼	Best estimate for number of mature individuals is 10,000-50,000.	
Germain's peacock-pheasant	Polyplectron germaini	5,400-27,000	VU	▼	Best estimate for number of mature individuals is 7,500-15,000.	
Chinese monal	Lophophorus lhuysii	6,000-10,000	VU	▼	Total population is estimated to be 9,000-15,000 individuals.	
Harwood's spurfowl	Pternistis harwoodi	6,000-15,000	NT	▼	Total population is estimated to be 10,000-19,999 individuals.	
Plumed guineafowl	Guttera plumifera	6,700-67,000	LC	▼	Total population is estimated to be 10,000-100,000 individuals.	
Wattled brushturkey	Aepypodius arfakianus	6,700-670,000	LC	▼		
New Guinea scrubfowl	Megapodius decollatus	6,700-670,000	LC	▼		
Melanesian scrubfowl (Melanesian megapode)	Megapodius eremita	6,700-670,000	LC	▼		
Yellow-legged brushturkey (Black-billed brushturkey)	Talegalla fuscirostris	6,700-670,000	LC	▼		
Red-legged brushturkey (Collared brushturkey)	Talegalla jobiensis	6,700-670,000	LC	▼		
Baudo guan	Penelope ortoni	7,000-21,000	EN	▼	Total population is estimated to be 10,000-32,000 individuals.	
Chinese grouse	Tetrastes sewerzowi	7,300-95,000	NT	▼	Best estimate for number of mature individuals is 10,000-25,000.	
Swamp francolin	Ortygornis gularis	7,500-20,000	NT	▼		
Grey-striped spurfowl	Pternistis griseostriatus	7,500-35,000	LC	▼		
Maleo	Macrocephalon maleo	8,000-14,000	CR	▼		
Dark-backed wood quail	Odontophorus melanonotus	9,200-13,800	LC	▼		
Chestnut-necklaced partridge	Tropicoperdix charltonii	< 10,000	VU	▼	Value given may be an underestimate.	
Yellow-knobbed curassow	Crax daubentoni	>10,000	NT	▼	Population is "likely substantially larger [than surveyed Colombian population], exceeding 10,000 mature individuals."	
Tibetan eared-pheasant	Crossoptilon harmani	>10,000	LC	Steady	Population size has not been formally quantified, but "probably (perhaps greatly) exceeds 10,000 mature individuals."	
Green peafowl	Pavo muticus	10,000-19,999	EN	▼	Total population is estimated to be 15,000-30,000 individuals.	
Sula scrubfowl (Sula megapode)	Megapodius bernsteinii	10,000-19,999	VU	▼	Total population is estimated to be 15,000-30,000 individuals.	
Black partridge	Melanoperdix niger	10,000-19,999	VU	▼	Value is outdated, and is likely now an overestimate.	
Caucasian snowcock	Tetraogallus caucasicus	10,000-32,400	LC	Steady		
Siamese fireback	Lophura diardi	10,000-99,999	NT	▼	Population "probably numbers in the tens of thousands."	
Caspian snowcock	Tetraogallus caspius	15,000-38,000	LC	▼	Preliminary estimate based on extrapolating European population data.	
Malleefowl	Leipoa ocellata	20,000-30,000	VU	▼	Best estimate for number of mature individuals in 25,000.	
Moluccan scrubfowl (Moluccan megapode)	Eulipoa wallacei	20,000-49,999	VU	▼	Values given are from 1997 estimate. Population is highly uncertain following recent declines. Total population may actually be less than 20,000 mature individuals if recent estimates are accurate.	
Highland guan	Penelopina nigra	20,000-49,999	VU	▼		
Palawan peacock-pheasant	Polyplectron napoleonis	20,000-49,999	VU	▼		
Taiwan partridge	Arborophila crudigularis	20,000-49,999	NT	Steady	Total population is estimated to be 30,000-75,000 individuals.	
Ocellated turkey	Meleagris ocellata	20,000-49,999	NT	▼		
Long-tailed wood partridge	Dendrortyx macroura	20,000-49,999	LC	▼		
Elliot's pheasant	Syrmaticus ellioti	20,000-100,000	LC	▼		
Mikado pheasant	Syrmaticus mikado	20,000-100,000	LC	Steady		
Lesser prairie chicken	Tympanuchus pallidicinctus	22,000-41,000	VU	▼	Values given are for total population.	
Caucasian grouse	Lyrurus mlokosiewiczi	28,000-58,000	NT	▼	Total population is estimated to be 42,700-87,300 individuals.	
Salvin's curassow	Mitu salvini	33,000	LC	▼	Total population is estimated to approach 50,000 individuals.	
White-breasted guineafowl	Agelastes meleagrides	39,000-93,000	VU	▼	Total population is estimated to be 59,100-139,500 individuals.	
Great curassow	Crax rubra	40,000-50,000	VU	▼	Total population is estimated to be 50,000-499,999 individuals, but true population is expected to be at the lower end of this range.	
Band-tailed guan	Penelope argyrotis	45,000	LC	▼	Total population is estimated to be 70,000 individuals.	
Nahan's partridge	Ptilopachus nahani	50,000-99,999	VU	▼	Values given are for total population.	
Black-fronted wood quail	Odontophorus atrifrons	50,000-99,999	LC	▼	Total population is estimated to be 104,000 individuals.	
Collared partridge (White-necklaced partridge)	Arborophila gingica	50,000-250,000	NT	▼		
Copper pheasant	Syrmaticus soemmerringii	50,000-300,000	LC	?		
Black-eared wood quail	Odontophorus melanotis	50,000-499,999	NT	▼		
Crested guan	Penelope purpurascens	50,000-499,999	NT	▼		
Tawny-faced quail	Rhynchortyx cinctus	50,000-499,999	NT	▼		
Black guan	Chamaepetes unicolor	50,000-499,999	LC	▼		
Black-throated bobwhite (Yucatan bobwhite)	Colinus nigrogularis	50,000-499,999	LC	▼		
Buffy-crowned wood partridge	Dendrortyx leucophrys	50,000-499,999	LC	▼		
Singing quail	Dactylortyx thoracicus	50,000-499,999	LC	▼		
Spotted wood quail	Odontophorus guttatus	50,000-499,999	LC	▼		
Black-breasted wood quail	Odontophorus leucolaemus	50,000-499,999	LC	▼		
Banded quail	Philortyx fasciatus	50,000-499,999	LC	Steady		
West Mexican chachalaca	Ortalis poliocephala	50,000-500,000	LC	▼		
Rufous-bellied chachalaca	Ortalis wagleri	50,000-500,000	LC	▼		
Siberian grouse	Falcipennis falcipennis	55,000-135,000	LC	▼	Total population is estimated to be 68,400-168,000 individuals.	
Temminck's tragopan	Tragopan temminckii	67,000-340,000	LC	▼		
Rock partridge	Alectoris graeca	79,600-154,200	NT	▼		
Chestnut-breasted partridge	Arborophila mandellii	80,000-140,000	NT	▼		
Great argus	Argusianus argus	>100,000	VU	▼	Value given is for total population.	
Spot-bellied bobwhite	Colinus leucopogon	100,000-499,999	LC	Steady		
Rufous-breasted wood quail	Odontophorus speciosus	100,000-499,999	LC	▼		
Buff-browed chachalaca	Ortalis superciliaris	100,000-499,999	LC	▼		
Black guineafowl	Agelastes niger	100,000-500,000	LC	▼	Values given are for total population.	
Orange-footed scrubfowl	Megapodius reinwardt	100,000-1,000,000	LC	▼		
See-see partridge	Ammoperdix griseogularis	150,000-249,999	LC	?		
Chestnut wood quail	Odontophorus hyperythrus	157,300-484,000	LC	▼		
Crestless curassow	Mitu tomentosum	180,000-1,480,000	LC	▼	Total population is estimated to be 275,000-2,225,000 individuals.	
Dusky grouse	Dendragapus obscurus	200,000	LC	Steady		
Mountain quail	Oreortyx pictus	260,000	LC	▼		
Sage grouse (Greater sage-grouse)	Centrocercus urophasianus	289,000-550,000	VU	▼	Best estimate for number of mature individuals is 350,000.	
Black francolin	Francolinus francolinus	300,000-849,999	LC	Steady		
Razor-billed curassow	Mitu tuberosum	300,000-2,000,000	NT	▼	Total population is estimated to be 500,000 - 3,000,000 individuals.	
Greater prairie chicken	Tympanuchus cupido	360,000	NT	▲		
Elegant quail	Callipepla douglasii	500,000-4,999,999	LC	▼		
Grey-headed chachalaca	Ortalis cinereiceps	500,000-5,000,000	LC	Steady		
Sharp-tailed grouse	Tympanuchus phasianellus	760,000	LC	▲		
Sooty grouse	Dendragapus fuliginosus	2,000,000	LC	Steady		
White-tailed ptarmigan	Lagopus leucura	2,000,000	LC	▼		
Plain chachalaca	Ortalis vetula	2,000,000	LC	Steady		
Rusty-margined guan	Penelope superciliaris	2,000,000-20,000,000	NT	▼	Total population is estimated to be 4,000,000 - 29,000,000 individuals.	
Grey partridge	Perdix perdix	3,300,000-5,300,000	LC	▼		
Western capercaillie	Tetrao urogallus	3,980,000-8,550,000	LC	▼		
Chukar (Chukar partridge)	Alectoris chukar	5,000,000-34,999,999	LC	Steady		
Crested bobwhite	Colinus cristatus	5,000,000-49,999,999	LC	Steady		
Scaled quail	Callipepla squamata	5,100,000	LC	▼		
Northern bobwhite	Colinus virginianus	5,800,000	NT	▼		
California quail	Callipepla californica	5,800,000	LC	▲		
Gambel's quail	Callipepla gambelii	5,800,000	LC	Steady		
Wild turkey	Meleagris gallopavo	6,900,000	LC	▲	IUCN/BirdLife International do not report a sample size estimate. Reported value comes from Partners in Flight Database.	
Black grouse	Lyrurus tetrix	6,940,000-10,700,000	LC	▼	Preliminary global estimate extrapolated from European population.	
Red-legged partridge	Alectoris rufa	9,950,000-13,700,000	NT	▼		
Spruce grouse	Canachites canadensis	11,000,000	LC	▲		
Rock ptarmigan	Lagopus muta	11,500,000-14,300,000	LC	?		
Hazel grouse	Tetrastes bonasia	13,400,000-23,200,000	LC	▼	Preliminary global estimate extrapolated from European population.	
Common quail	Coturnix coturnix	15,000,000-35,000,000	LC	▼	Preliminary global estimate extrapolated from European population.	
Ruffed grouse	Bonasa umbellus	18,000,000	LC	Steady		
Willow grouse (Willow ptarmigan)	Lagopus lagopus	39,000,000-43,000,000	LC	▼	Preliminary global estimate extrapolated from European, United States, Canadian populations. Note that IOC taxonomy splits an additional species, the red grouse (L. scotica), from this species. IUCN/BirdLife International maintain both species within L. lagopus.	
Common pheasant	Phasianus colchicus	50,000,000-100,000,000	LC	?	Values given are for population in native range. Population of the species in its introduced range is estimated to be 25,000,000-50,000,000 individuals.	

== Species without population estimates ==
Common name	Binomial name	Population	Status	Trend	Notes	Image
Dulit partridge	Rhizothera dulitensis	unknown	DD	?	Species has not been seen since 1902.	
Malayan crestless fireback (Crestless fireback)	Lophura erythrophthalma	unknown	CR	▼		
Annamite crested argus (Crested argus; Vietnamese crested argus)	Rheinardia ocellata	unknown	CR	▼	Population is decreasing incredibly rapidly, with an estimated loss of 80% of the population over three generations.	
Bornean crestless fireback	Lophura pyronota	unknown	EN	▼		
Bare-faced curassow	Crax fasciolata	unknown	VU	▼		
Bulwer's pheasant	Lophura bulweri	unknown	VU	▼		
Bornean crested fireback	Lophura ignita	unknown	VU	▼		
Malayan crested fireback	Lophura rufa	unknown	VU	▼		
White-browed guan	Penelope jacucaca	unknown	VU	▼		
White-crested guan	Penelope pileata	unknown	VU	▼		
Red-throated piping guan	Pipile cujubi	unknown	VU	▼		
Crested partridge	Rollulus rouloul	unknown	VU	▼		
Ferruginous partridge	Caloperdix oculeus	unknown	NT	▼		
Japanese quail	Coturnix japonica	unknown	NT	▼		
Salvadori's pheasant	Lophura inornata	unknown	NT	▼	Hoogerwerf's pheasant (L. i. hoogerwerfi) was previously considered to be a separate species, but is now treated as a subspecies of this one by both the IOC and IUCN/BirdLife International.	
Venezuelan wood quail	Odontophorus columbianus	unknown	NT	▼		
White-throated piping guan	Pipile grayi	unknown	NT	▼		
Long-billed partridge	Rhizothera longirostris	unknown	NT	▼		
Moorland francolin	Scleroptila psilolaema	unknown	NT	▼		
Sabah partridge	Tropicoperdix graydoni	unknown	NT	▼		
Wattled guan	Aburria aburri	unknown	LC	▼		
Vulturine guineafowl	Acryllium vulturinum	unknown	LC	Steady		
Barbary partridge	Alectoris barbara	unknown	LC	?	European subpopulation is estimated to be 15,500-41,000 mature individuals.	
Przevalski's partridge	Alectoris magna	unknown	LC	▼		
Arabian partridge	Alectoris melanocephala	unknown	LC	Steady		
Philby's partridge	Alectoris philbyi	unknown	LC	Steady		
Australian brushturkey	Alectura lathami	unknown	LC	▼		
Sand partridge	Ammoperdix heyi	unknown	LC	Steady		
White-cheeked partridge	Arborophila atrogularis	unknown	LC	▼		
Bar-backed partridge	Arborophila brunneopectus	unknown	LC	▼		
Malay partridge (Malayan partridge)	Arborophila campbelli	unknown	LC	▼		
Bornean partridge (Red-breasted partridge)	Arborophila hyperythra	unknown	LC	▼		
Chestnut-bellied partridge	Arborophila javanica	unknown	LC	▼		
Tan-breasted partridge (Roll's partridge)	Arborophila rolli	unknown	LC	▼		
Red-billed partridge	Arborophila rubrirostris	unknown	LC	▼		
Rufous-throated partridge	Arborophila rufogularis	unknown	LC	▼		
Sumatran partridge	Arborophila sumatrana	unknown	LC	▼		
Hill partridge	Arborophila torqueola	unknown	LC	Steady		
Mountain bamboo partridge	Bambusicola fytchii	unknown	LC	▼		
Taiwan bamboo partridge	Bambusicola sonorivox	unknown	LC	Steady		
Chinese bamboo partridge	Bambusicola thoracicus	unknown	LC	▼		
White-throated francolin	Campocolinus albogularis	unknown	LC	Steady		
Coqui francolin	Campocolinus coqui	unknown	LC	Steady		
Schlegel's francolin	Campocolinus schlegelii	unknown	LC	Steady		
Sickle-winged guan	Chamaepetes goudotii	unknown	LC	▼		
Lady Amherst's pheasant	Chrysolophus amherstiae	unknown	LC	▼		
Golden pheasant	Chrysolophus pictus	unknown	LC	▼		
Blue eared-pheasant	Crossoptilon auritum	unknown	LC	▼		
Rain quail	Coturnix coromandelica	unknown	LC	Steady		
Harlequin quail	Coturnix delegorguei	unknown	LC	Steady		
Stubble quail	Coturnix pectoralis	unknown	LC	▲		
Black curassow	Crax alector	unknown	LC	▼		
White eared-pheasant	Crossoptilon crossoptilon	unknown	LC	Steady		
Montezuma quail	Cyrtonyx montezumae	unknown	LC	▼		
Painted francolin	Francolinus pictus	unknown	LC	▼		
Chinese francolin	Francolinus pintadeanus	unknown	LC	Steady		
Sri Lanka spurfowl	Galloperdix bicalcarata	unknown	LC	▼		
Painted spurfowl	Galloperdix lunulata	unknown	LC	Steady		
Red spurfowl	Galloperdix spadicea	unknown	LC	Steady		
Red junglefowl	Gallus gallus	unknown	LC	▼		
Sri Lanka junglefowl	Gallus lafayettii	unknown	LC	Steady		
Grey junglefowl	Gallus sonneratii	unknown	LC	▼		
Green junglefowl	Gallus varius	unknown	LC	Steady		
Southern crested guineafowl	Guttera edouardi	unknown	LC	▼		
Eastern crested guineafowl	Guttera pucherani	unknown	LC	▼		
Western crested guineafowl	Guttera verreauxi	unknown	LC	▼		
Crimson-headed partridge	Haematortyx sanguiniceps	unknown	LC	Steady		
Blood pheasant	Ithaginis cruentus	unknown	LC	▼		
Snow partridge	Lerwa lerwa	unknown	LC	▼		
Himalayan monal	Lophophorus impejanus	unknown	LC	▼		
Kalij pheasant	Lophura leucomelanos	unknown	LC	▼		
Silver pheasant	Lophura nycthemera	unknown	LC	▼		
Sclater's monal	Lophophorus sclateri	unknown	LC	▼		
Madagascar partridge	Margaroperdix madagarensis	unknown	LC	▼		
Philippine scrubfowl (Philippine megapode)	Megapodius cumingii	unknown	LC	▼		
Nocturnal curassow	Nothocrax urumutum	unknown	LC	▼		
Helmeted guineafowl	Numida meleagris	unknown	LC	Steady		
Stripe-faced wood quail	Odontophorus balliviani	unknown	LC	▼		
Spot-winged wood quail	Odontophorus capueira	unknown	LC	▼		
Rufous-fronted wood quail	Odontophorus erythrops	unknown	LC	▼		
Marbled wood quail	Odontophorus gujanensis	unknown	LC	▼		
Starred wood quail	Odontophorus stellatus	unknown	LC	▼		
East Brazilian chachalaca	Ortalis araucuan	unknown	LC	▼		
Chaco chachalaca	Ortalis canicollis	unknown	LC	▼		
Colombian chachalaca	Ortalis columbiana	unknown	LC	▼		
Chestnut-winged chachalaca	Ortalis garrula	unknown	LC	Steady		
Speckled chachalaca	Ortalis guttata	unknown	LC	?		
White-bellied chachalaca	Ortalis leucogastra	unknown	LC	▼		
Little chachalaca	Ortalis motmot	unknown	LC	▼	Note that IOC taxonomy splits an additional species, the chestnut-headed chachalaca (O. ruficeps), from this one. IUCN/BirdLife International place both species within O. motmot.	
Rufous-vented chachalaca	Ortalis ruficauda	unknown	LC	Steady		
Scaled chachalaca	Ortalis squamata	unknown	LC	▼		
Grey francolin	Ortygornis pondicerianus	unknown	LC	Steady		
Crested francolin	Ortygornis sephaena	unknown	LC	Steady		
Indian peafowl	Pavo cristatus	unknown	LC	▲		
Forest francolin (Latham's francolin)	Peliperdix lathami	unknown	LC	▼		
Red-faced guan	Penelope dabbenei	unknown	LC	▼		
Spix's guan	Penelope jacquacu	unknown	LC	▼		
Marail guan	Penelope marail	unknown	LC	▼		
Andean guan	Penelope montagnii	unknown	LC	▼		
Dusky-legged guan	Penelope obscura	unknown	LC	▼	Note that IOC taxonomy splits an additional species, the Yungas guan (P. bridgesi), from this one. IUCN/BirdLife International place both species within P. obscura.	
Rock bush quail	Perdicula argoondah	unknown	LC	▼		
Jungle bush quail	Perdicula asiatica	unknown	LC	Steady		
Painted bush quail	Perdicula erythrorhyncha	unknown	LC	Steady		
Daurian partridge	Perdix dauurica	unknown	LC	▼		
Tibetan partridge	Perdix hodgsoniae	unknown	LC	Steady		
Green pheasant	Phasianus versicolor	unknown	LC	▲		
Blue-throated piping guan	Pipile cumanensis	unknown	LC	▼		
Grey peacock-pheasant	Polyplectron bicalcaratum	unknown	LC	▼		
Bronze-tailed peacock-pheasant	Polyplectron chalcurum	unknown	LC	▼		
Red-billed spurfowl	Pternistis adspersus	unknown	LC	Steady		
Red-necked spurfowl	Pternistis afer	unknown	LC	▼		
Ahanta spurfowl	Pternistis ahantensis	unknown	LC	▼		
Double-spurred spurfowl	Pternistis bicalcaratus	unknown	LC	▼		
Cape spurfowl	Pternistis capensis	unknown	LC	Steady		
Chestnut-naped spurfowl	Pternistis castaneicollis	unknown	LC	▼		
Clapperton's spurfowl	Pternistis clappertoni	unknown	LC	▼		
Erckel's spurfowl	Pternistis erckelii	unknown	LC	Steady		
Hartlaub's spurfowl	Pternistis hartlaubi	unknown	LC	Steady		
Hildebrandt's spurfowl	Pternistis hildebrandti	unknown	LC	Steady		
Heuglin's spurfowl	Pternistis icterorhynchus	unknown	LC	Steady		
Jackson's spurfowl	Pternistis jacksoni	unknown	LC	▼		
Yellow-necked spurfowl	Pternistis leucoscepus	unknown	LC	▼		
Natal spurfowl	Pternistis natalensis	unknown	LC	Steady		
Handsome spurfowl	Pternistis nobilis	unknown	LC	▼		
Grey-breasted spurfowl	Pternistis rufopictus	unknown	LC	▼		
Scaly spurfowl	Pternistis squamatus	unknown	LC	▼		
Swainson's spurfowl	Pternistis swainsonii	unknown	LC	Steady		
Stone partridge	Ptilopachus petrosus	unknown	LC	Steady		
Koklass pheasant	Pucrasia macrolopha	unknown	LC	▼		
Grey-winged francolin	Scleroptila afra	unknown	LC	Steady		
Elgon francolin	Scleroptila elgonensis	unknown	LC	▼		
Finsch's francolin	Scleroptila finschi	unknown	LC	▼		
Orange River francolin	Scleroptila gutturalis	unknown	LC	Steady		
Red-winged francolin	Scleroptila levaillantii	unknown	LC	Steady		
Shelley's francolin	Scleroptila shelleyi	unknown	LC	▼		
Ring-necked francolin	Scleroptila streptophora	unknown	LC	▼		
Whyte's francolin	Scleroptila whytei	unknown	LC	Steady		
African blue quail (Blue quail)	Synoicus adansonii	unknown	LC	Steady		
Asian blue quail (King quail)	Synoicus chinensis	unknown	LC	Steady		
Snow Mountain quail	Synoicus monorthonyx	unknown	LC	Steady	IUCN/BirdLife International place this species in genus Anurophasis.	
Brown quail	Synoicus ypsilophorus	unknown	LC	▼		
Red-billed brushturkey	Talegalla cuvieri	unknown	LC	▼		
Black-billed capercaillie	Tetrao urogalloides	unknown	LC	▼		
Altai snowcock	Tetraogallus altaicus	unknown	LC	▼		
Himalayan snowcock	Tetraogallus himalayensis	unknown	LC	Steady		
Tibetan snowcock	Tetraogallus tibetanus	unknown	LC	Steady		
Chestnut-throated partridge (Chestnut-throated monal-partridge)	Tetraophasis obscurus	unknown	LC	▼		
Buff-throated partridge (Buff-throated monal-partridge)	Tetraophasis szechenyii	unknown	LC	▼		
Satyr tragopan	Tragopan satyra	unknown	LC	▼	Population is "possibly in the tens, if not hundreds, of thousands," but given the lack of monitoring data, population is considered unknown.	
Green-legged partridge	Tropicoperdix chloropus	unknown	LC	▼		

== Populations of domestic Galliformes ==
Note that domestic subspecies are not evaluated by the IUCN.

Common name	Binomial name	Population	Status	Trend	Notes	Image
Domestic guinea fowl	Numidia meleagris domesticus	?	NE	NA	Domestic geese (Anseriformes) and guinea fowl together amounted to 364 million birds in 2020. However, the FAO database reports over 375 million domestic geese alone for 2020, so it is difficult to infer this population value.	
Domestic turkey	Meleagris gallopavo domesticus	450,000,000	NE	NA	Subspecies of wild turkey.	Turkeys at Polyface Farm
Chicken	Gallus gallus domesticus (sometimes, G. domesticus)	33,000,000,000	NE	NA	This is a subspecies of red junglefowl with attributes of other species.	

== See also ==
- Lists of birds by population
- Lists of organisms by population
