= Consumed scrubfowl =

Consumed scrubfowl Temporal range: Holocene

Conservation status
- Extinct

Scientific classification
- Kingdom: Animalia
- Phylum: Chordata
- Class: Aves
- Order: Galliformes
- Family: Megapodiidae
- Genus: Megapodius
- Species: †M. alimentum

Binomial name
- †Megapodius alimentum Steadman, 1989

Extinct species of bird

The consumed scrubfowl (Megapodius alimentum) is an extinct megapode that was native to Fiji and Tonga in the south-west Pacific Ocean. It was originally described from subfossil remains collected by David Steadman from an archaeological site at Tongoleleka, on the island of Lifuka in the Haʻapai group of the Kingdom of Tonga. The specific epithet and vernacular name refer to its evident use as a food item. Subsequently, remains were also found on Lakeba and Mago in the Lau group of Fiji by Trevor Worthy. It likely became extinct through overhunting following human settlement of the islands some 3,500 years ago but may have persisted until the mid-late 19th century.

A single megapode egg, olive-tan with slightly darker mottling, was collected in the mid-19th century on an undetermined island of the Haʻapai group by Lieutenant Burnaby of the Royal Navy – most likely on Lifuka, as this was and still is the commercial and political centre of the group. In 1861 this egg (specimen BM(NH) 1988.4.3) was described as Megapodius burnabyi by George Robert Gray. It was subsequently assigned to Megapodius freycinet or Megapodius pritchardii by most authors. However, the former species does not occur anywhere near Tonga today, and probably never did even in the past when it may have been more widespread. M. pritchardii, by contrast, formerly inhabited many islands of Tonga, including Lifuka and most other large islands of the Haʻapai group, as evidenced by subfossil remains. Additionally, the extinct Megapodius molistructor or a close relative is also known from prehistoric remains found on Lifuka. But this species was huge, one of the largest megapodes known to date and far exceeding M. pritchardii in size. M. alimentum on the other hand was of medium size by Megapodius standards, about 30% larger than M. pritchardii. The M. burnabyi egg was restudied by Steadman subsequent to his description of the extinct megapodes from Lifuka. He found it to be much like typical M. pritchardii eggs; however, it is fairly long by comparison but remarkably narrow, resulting in an elongated shape that is rare in Megapodius: while M. freycinet and M. pritchardii eggs are typically 1.65 times as long as they are wide, the M. burnabyi egg is 1.76 times as long as it is wide. Small eggs of M. pritchardii, however, may occasionally have an elongated shape like Burnaby's specimen.

While it should be technically possible to extract ancient DNA from the singular egg (as was done for a duck egg collected in 1855), pending such a study, the identity of M. burnabyi is unresolved and it is best regarded as a nomen dubium – it most likely either represents a large and unusually-shaped egg of M. pritchardii, or a small egg of M. alimentum, which in this case must have survived in some numbers to about 1860 or even a bit later. The caveat, however, is that megapode eggs were traded between islands and even archipelagos, and given the uncertainties of its collection, M. burnabyi may be such a trade item and belong to another extant or recently extinct megapode species, possibly not even from Tonga. And of course, even if the egg was collected on Lifuka, the island might have been home to yet another now-extinct megapode species of which no remains have been found to date. But with 3 species of Megapodius – one large, one mid-sized, and one small – known to formerly inhabit the Haʻapai group, as well as the extensive palaeontological and archaeological fieldwork conducted there, this is considered unlikely.
