= Variable chachalaca =

The name variable chachalaca may refer to one of two bird species:

- Little chachalaca, Ortalis motmot
- Chestnut-headed chachalaca, Ortalis ruficeps
