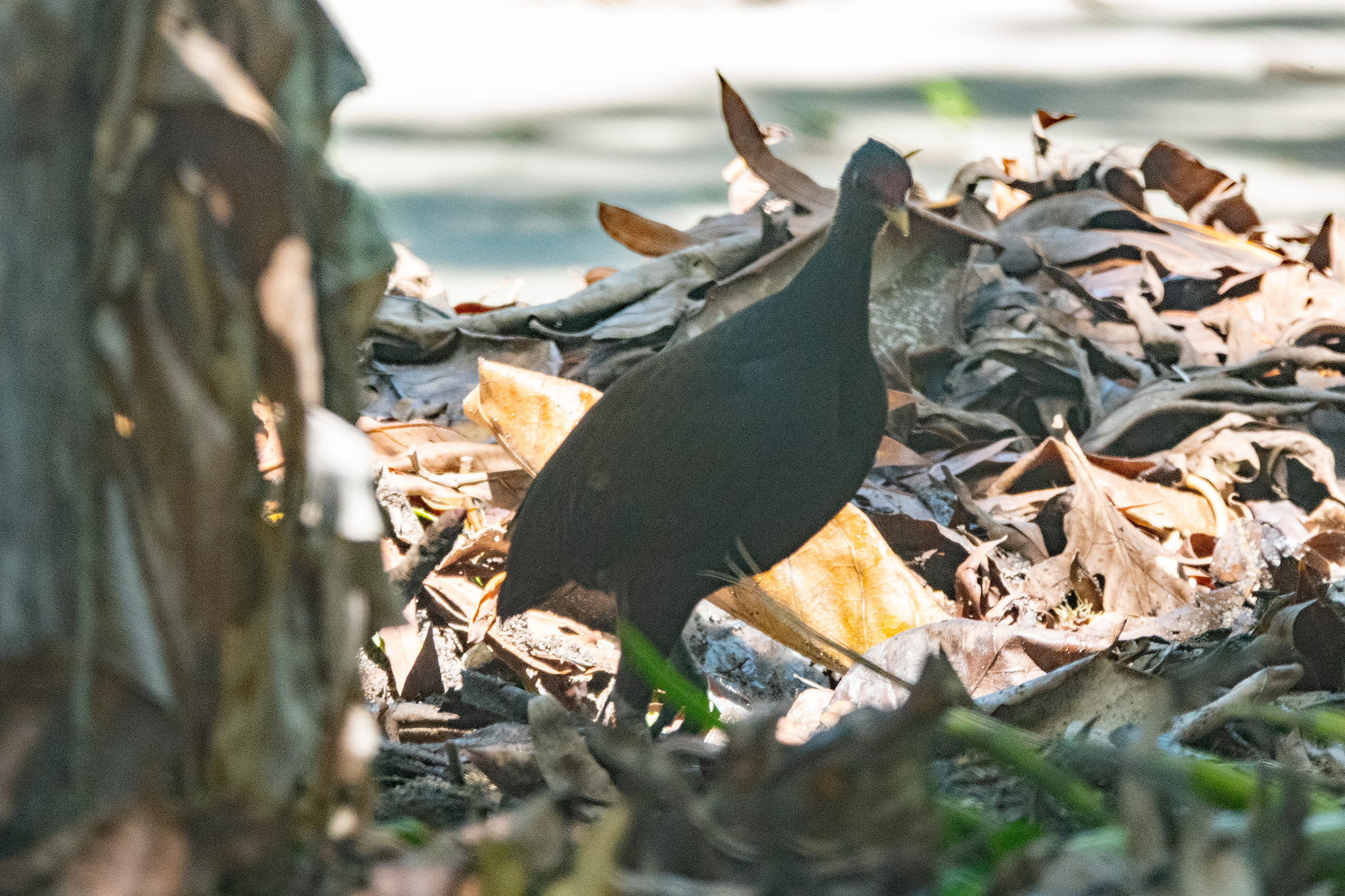

Conservation status
- Least Concern (IUCN 3.1)

Scientific classification
- Kingdom: Animalia
- Phylum: Chordata
- Class: Aves
- Order: Galliformes
- Family: Megapodiidae
- Genus: Megapodius
- Species: M. eremita

Binomial name
- Megapodius eremita Hartlaub, 1868

= Melanesian megapode =

Species of bird

The Melanesian scrubfowl or Melanesian megapode (Megapodius eremita) is a megapode species that is endemic to islands within Melanesia. The Melanesian scrubfowl has a unique strategy of egg incubation in which it relies on environmental heat sources. This bird species is culturally important for Indigenous peoples in Melanesia.

== Taxonomy and systematics ==
Two names are commonly used to refer to the species Megapodius eremita: the Melanesian scrubfowl and Melanesian megapode. M. eremita belongs to the family Megapodiidae (the megapodes) and genus Megapodius (the scrubfowl). Following this classification, some taxonomists prefer the common designation "scrubfowl" because it is more precise, identifying the species as part of its particular genus rather than the megapode family as a whole.

The species M. eremita was first described and introduced to 'Western' taxonomy by Hartlaub in 1868. But, as later taxonomists struggled to identify whether scrubfowl groups were distinct species or subspecies, the Melanesian scrubfowl was often reclassified as a subspecies of M. freycinet (the Dusky scrubfowl) (several other scrubfowl species were similarly considered subspecies of M. freycinet). Molecular phylogenetic analyses support the classification of M. eremita as one of the 13 distinct scrubfowl species. The Melanesian scrubfowl shows morphological variation within its range but is considered monotypic (with no subspecies).

A 2002 study focused on the evolutionary relationships between megapode species and found that the species in the Megapodius genus are "very closely related". A 2014 study with more extensive and complete sampling further resolved the relationships between megapode species and showed that M. eremita is the third most recently diverged scrubfowl group and most closely related to a clade containing the New Guinea scrubfowl, the Dusky scrubfowl and the Forsten's scrubfowl.

Megapodius species appear to have radiated within the last two million years, as they dispersed through and settled the islands of Australasia where they now occupy mostly non-overlapping ranges. The Melanesian scrubfowl hybridises with the New Guinea scrubfowl (M. decollatus) where their ranges overlap on the islands of Karkar and Bagabag near mainland New Guinea.

== Description ==
Similar to other megapodes, Melanesian scrubfowl have a stout body shape, characteristically large feet, and rounded wings. Scrubfowl, including M. eremita, also have very short tails, giving the birds a distinctive silhouette lacking a visible tail. Adult Melanesian scrubfowl measure around 34 to 39 cm and have a short crest.

The Melanesian scrubfowl has three different plumage types during its lifecycle: the juvenile plumage of chicks, a second immature plumage, and adult plumage. Adult birds have a brown back; dark grey head, neck and underparts; brown-, grey- or olive-coloured legs; red patches of bare skin on the face (notably on the forehead); and a yellow bill-tip. Females and males cannot easily be distinguished visually but the female may have lighter-coloured legs and a brighter brown colour. The plumage of M. eremita chicks is dark brown with paler underparts, obvious barring on their upperparts and includes flight feathers. Megapode hatchlings are relatively large (proportionally to adults) (no average sizes are reported for M. eremita chicks but Jones et al. (1995) observed an 11 cm hatchling). The second immature plumage closely resembles the adult but often has darker colours. The Melanesian scrubfowl shows some variation in its appearance across its range with eastern populations being lighter and more red-brown in colour.

The Melanesian scrubfowl is generally easily distinguished from other species within its range by the characteristics described above. With clear observation, plumage pattern and facial colours suffice to separate the Melanesian scrubfowl (adults, immatures and chicks) from species of rails, crakes, pigeons and the Australasian swamphen. Observing only the silhouette, the distinguishing features of the Melanesian scrubfowl are its stout shape, short tail and short head crest. The trailing legs of scrubfowl in flight can help identify them but the Australasian swamphen has a similar flying posture, differing only in its slower flight. Where the Melanesian scrubfowl occurs together with the New Guinea scrubfowl, it may be distinguished by its shorter crest (longer and more pointed in M. decollatus) and its bare forehead (feathered in M. decollatus), although hybrids may complicate visual identification).

== Distribution and habitat ==
All megapodes are found in Australasia, and, within this region, the Melanesian scrubfowl has an island distribution encompassing the Bismarck Archipelago and Solomon Islands. The Melanesian scrubfowl lives on small and large islands, and is fairly common (although more or less so throughout its range).

The Melanesian scrubfowl moves between different habitat types required for breeding and for foraging. With its specialised nesting behaviour, the Melanesian scrubfowl uses breeding grounds where the substrate can be or is heated by environmental heat sources. Common breeding grounds include sandy beaches warmed by the sun, geothermal sites (i.e., heat from Earth's interior surfacing around volcanoes), and in soils with decaying organic matter. The Melanesian scrubfowl preferably forages in lowland rainforests with large trees, an open understorey, a thick surface layer of dead plant material and deep soils.

In some parts of its range, the Melanesian scrubfowl travels between and uses different habitats as a response to seasonal changes. For example, in West New Britain, scrubfowl use north coast breeding grounds during the local dry season (from late March and December) and avoid these areas during the local rainy season when the site becomes flooded.

== Behaviour and ecology ==
=== Reproduction ===
The Melanesian scrubfowl is thought to be socially monogamous but their social behaviour, including pair bonds, is not well documented.

However, the family Megapodiidae are well known for their unique nesting strategies in which they lay eggs in mounds or burrows where heat from the environment and not from the body ensures the development of embryos. The nesting behaviour of the Melanesian scrubfowl varies considerably throughout its range with the species using either burrows or mounds, and relying on heat from various sources including decomposition, volcanism, and sunshine. The use of mounds by the Melanesian scrubfowl is poorly studied while the burrowing activity of Melanesian scrubfowl has been more widely documented.

Where mound-nesting occurs, Melanesian scrubfowl build large, volcano-shaped mounds with soil or sand, and leaves. Information specific to M. eremita is unavailable, but studies on other megapodes show that the heating of mounds depends primarily on the decomposition of the organic matter (and, sometimes, partly on solar radiation) and that one or both sexes tend the mound, regularly adding in more organic matter.

In contrast, burrow-nesters choose nesting sites that are already heated through geothermal energy, solar radiation or the decomposition of tree roots. Melanesian scrubfowl only visit breeding grounds to lay eggs and the female likely digs the burrow alone; the birds do not have to tend the burrows and are not thought to defend them. Where M. eremita burrows have been studied, they measure between 20 and 90 cm in diameter, contain layers of eggs laid between 30 and 90 cm deep, and are maintained at relatively high and constant temperatures (e.g., at one nesting site, the eggs were surrounded by soil with temperatures of 36 and 37 °C while the air temperature was 31 °C).

Where it burrows, M. eremita may nest singly (e.g., in forests at the base of trees) or communally, with very large nesting fields occurring at geothermal sites. On Lou Island, Melanesian scrubfowl dig hundreds of burrows in volcanically heated soils. The largest communal breeding grounds are at Pokili and Garu on the north coast of West New Britain where, in the 1970s, thousands to tens of thousands of birds were documented to nest in around 10,000 burrows at each site. In these communal nesting fields, scrubfowl dig burrows closely together, often less than a metre apart. Researchers do not yet know whether Melanesian scrubfowl share burrows nor if they lay eggs in multiple burrows.

Female Melanesian scrubfowl lay around ten to 30 eggs per year with intervals of two to 15 days between each egg. In this species, breeding and egg-laying appears to occur either year-round or seasonally in different parts of its range: on the north coast of West New Britain, M. eremita only digs burrows and lays eggs during the dry season (between late March and December); on Savo Island, Melanesian scrubfowl appear to lay eggs throughout the year; on Simbo Island, this scrubfowl lays more eggs between June and December.

Like other megapodes, Melanesian scrubfowl lay large eggs with a high yolk content (possibly as high as 65-69% of egg content compared to 15-40% in other birds). Melanesian scrubfowl eggs are adapted to surviving underground (e.g., thin egg shells improve gas exchange) during their incubation which lasts between six and ten weeks. Chicks lack an egg tooth, instead using their strong legs to crack the egg and dig to the surface. As a result of the high yolk content and long incubation time, megapode hatchlings are superprecocial, never interacting with their parents and capable of running, foraging and short-distance flying as soon as they surface.

=== Diet and foraging ===
The Melanesian scrubfowl is omnivorous, feeding on fruits, seeds (e.g., Canarium indicum nuts) and small invertebrates (e.g., insects, snails, millipedes, earthworms). Large numbers of these birds may nest in a restricted area and, when visiting these sites, they carry out some foraging. But, in order to source adequate and sufficient foods, scrubfowl likely disperse throughout surrounding rainforests after they have laid each egg. Notably, producing large, yolk-rich eggs requires a lot of energy that females must obtain through their diet. At their feeding habitats, they forage alone, in pairs or in small groups, by scratching the forest floor with their large feet and searching for food items in the leaf litter. Sometimes, they jump to pick low-hanging Ficus fruits.

=== Vocalisation ===
Melanesian scrubfowl vocalise regularly, loudly and throughout the day and night. Males produce territorial calls that last between one and five seconds and include honking, wailing and grunting sounds (e.g., kee-yah, kio, ko--ko--ko, etc. ). The species' song involves paired M. eremita singing a duet in which one partner produces a laugh-like "keyououourrr" sound and the other partner replies with a "keyou keyourr". Generally, duets are thought to aid in forming and strengthening pair bonds; this supports the assumption of monogamy in this scrubfowl species.

=== Movement ===
As opposed to other megapodes who fly poorly over short distances, Megapodius species are strong flyers and can travel long distances by flight; this ability likely allowed them to colonise and inhabit their island habitats. They flap their wings slowly and powerfully, stopping occasionally to glide. Melanesian scrubfowl fly between their breeding and foraging habits, and flight allows them to disperse throughout rainforests and access suitable foods. As mentioned previously, Melanesian scrubfowl may migrate over short-distances in response to seasonal change (e.g., in West New Britain in response to local precipitation patterns).

=== Predators ===
Mammals (e.g., dogs), raptors and varanid lizards may feed on Melanesian scrubfowl chicks, especially those under four weeks old. Various species including varanids, snakes, dogs and pigs can also locate the conspicuous nesting mounds or burrows, and dig up and eat scrubfowl eggs.

== Relationship with Humans ==
Throughout its range, the Melanesian scrubfowl is an important part of Human cultures and economies, with people harvesting its eggs as a food source and traditional trade item. Indigenous Melanesian peoples have lived alongside this scrubfowl for thousands of years, collecting its eggs at high but sustainable levels and gaining significant traditional ecological knowledge about its behaviour and ecology. In some places, people build shading structures over scrubfowl burrows to mark harvesting areas and improve the birds' nesting conditions.

Yet, studies of the region's fossil record show that Humans, upon their arrival in Oceania, also caused the extinction of many megapode species. So, while the Melanesian scrubfowl remains a species of least concern, changes in Human activity may affect the viability of this species. Notably, growing Human populations, the abandoning of traditional resource management systems and exploitative industries may threaten this species. For example, while Melanesian scrubfowl may tolerate light selective logging, large-scale and clear-cut commercial logging removes the rainforests that this species depends on for food. In the current context of often rapidly changing Human activities, Sinclair et al. highlight how conservation biologists and Indigenous peoples can work together, sharing scientific and traditional ecological knowledge, in order to strengthen existing systems of traditional resource management and ensure the persistence of the Melanesian scrubfowl.
