= Viti Levu scrubfowl =

Viti Levu scrubfowl Temporal range: Holocene

Conservation status
- Extinct

Scientific classification
- Kingdom: Animalia
- Phylum: Chordata
- Class: Aves
- Order: Galliformes
- Family: Megapodiidae
- Genus: Megapodius
- Species: †M. amissus

Binomial name
- †Megapodius amissus Worthy, 2000

Extinct species of bird

The Viti Levu scrubfowl (Megapodius amissus), also known as the Fiji scrubfowl or lost megapode, is an extinct megapode that was endemic to Fiji. The epithet amissus, from Latin "lost", refers to its extinction. Subfossil remains were collected from the Udit cave at Wainibuku on the island of Viti Levu in October 1998 by Trevor Worthy, G. Udy and S. Mataraba, and described by Worthy in 2000. The holotype is held by the Museum of New Zealand (reg. no: S.037468).

== Description ==
The megapode was similar in size to, or slightly larger than, the living orange-footed scrubfowl, though it had reduced wings and more robust legs, suggesting that it was flightless or almost flightless. It is likely that it became extinct through overhunting following human settlement of the Fiji Islands.
