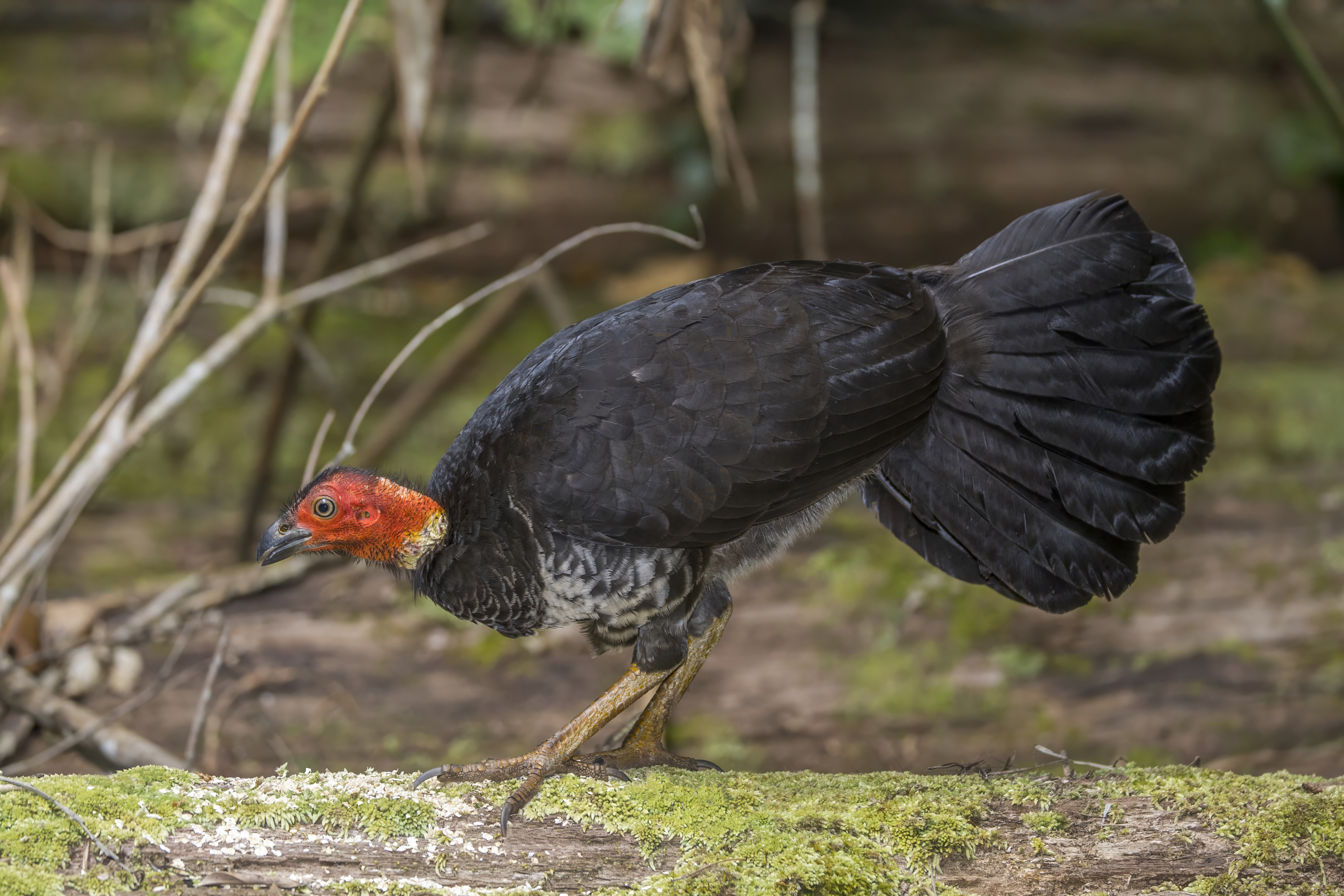
- Female Australian brushturkey (Alectura lathami)

Scientific classification
- Kingdom: Animalia
- Phylum: Chordata
- Class: Aves
- Order: Galliformes
- Family: Megapodiidae; Lesson, 1831

Genera
- Aepypodius; Alectura; Eulipoa; Leipoa; Macrocephalon; Megapodius; Talegalla

= Megapode =

Family of birds

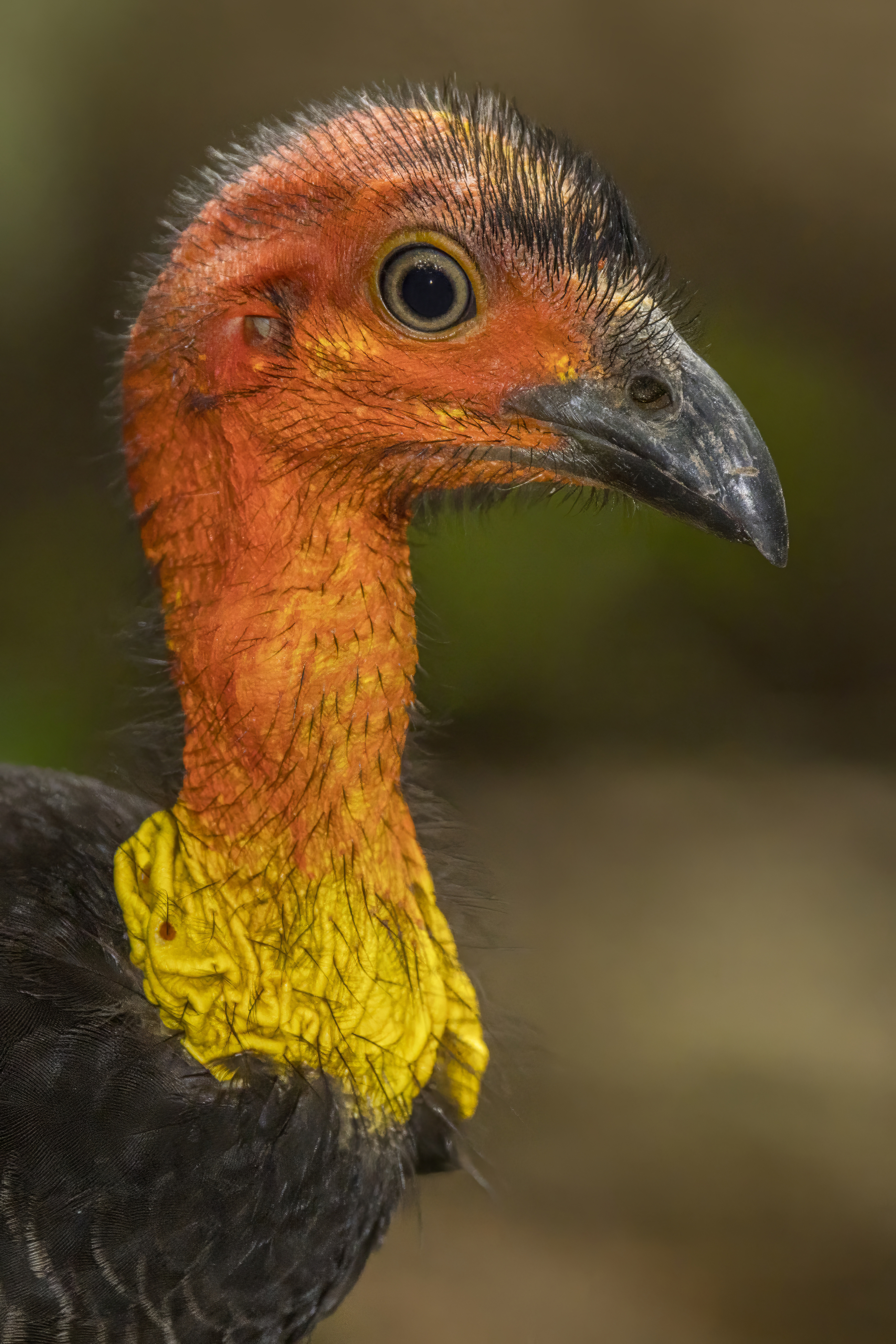
Brushturkeys can often be found in parks or gardens.

The megapodes, also known as incubator birds or mound-builders, are stocky, medium-large, chicken-like birds with small heads and large feet in the family Megapodiidae. Their name literally means "large foot" and is a reference to the heavy legs and feet typical of these terrestrial birds. All are browsers, and all except the malleefowl occupy wooded habitats. Most are brown or black in color. Megapodes are superprecocial, hatching from their eggs in the most mature condition of any bird. They hatch with open eyes, bodily coordination and strength, full wing feathers, and downy body feathers, and are able to run, pursue prey and, in some species, fly on the day they hatch.

== Etymology ==
The family name derives from the Ancient Greek μεγας (megas), μεγαλη (megalē) meaning "big" with πους (pous), ποδος (podos) meaning "foot".

== Description ==
Megapodes are medium-sized to large terrestrial birds with large legs and feet with sharp claws, which assist them in the preparation of pits and mounds to incubate their eggs. Megapodes are of three kinds: scrubfowl, brush turkeys, and mallee fowl or lowan. The largest members of the clade are the species of Alectura and Talegalla. The smallest are the Micronesian scrubfowl (Megapodius laperouse) and the Moluccan scrubfowl (Eulipoa wallacei). They have small heads, short beaks, and rounded and large wings. Their flying abilities vary within the clade. They present the hallux at the same level of the other toes just like the species of the clade Cracidae. The other Galliformes have their halluces raised above the level of the front toes.

== Distribution and habitat ==
Megapodes are found in the broader Australasian region, including islands in the western Pacific, Australia, New Guinea, and the islands of Indonesia east of the Wallace Line, but also the Andaman and Nicobar Islands in the Bay of Bengal. The distribution of the family has contracted in the Pacific with the arrival of humans, and a number of island groups such as Fiji, Tonga, and New Caledonia have lost many or all of their species. Raoul Island, a New Zealand territory and the main island of the Kermadec Islands, may also have once had a species of megapode, based on settler accounts.

== Behaviour and ecology ==
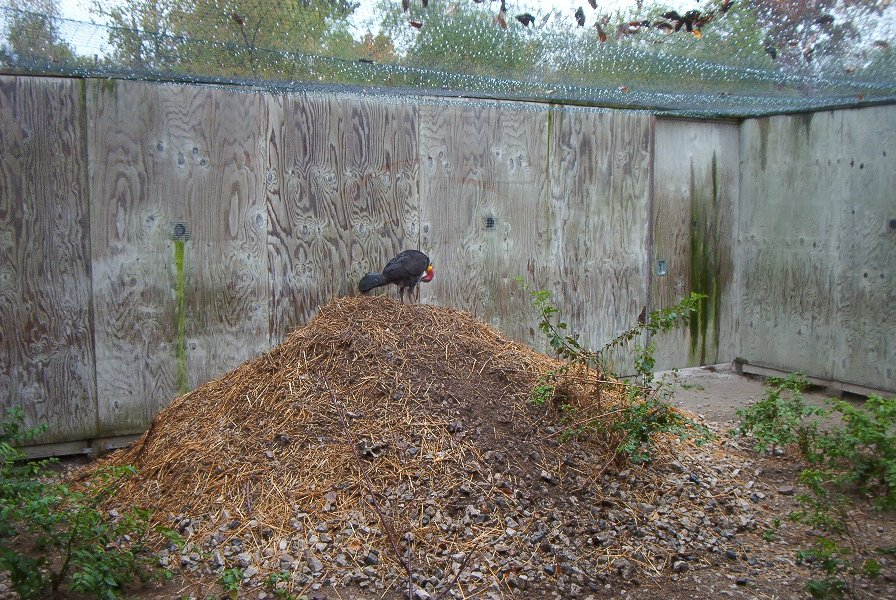
Australian brushturkey on its mound

Megapodes are mainly solitary birds that do not incubate their eggs with their body heat as other birds do, but bury them. In this their behaviour resembles that of turtles and crocodiles more closely than that of other birds. Their eggs are unusual in having a large yolk, making up 50–70% of the egg weight. There are three methods of incubation. Most of the family (about 13 species) are best known for building massive nest mounds of decaying vegetation, which generate heat through microbial decomposition, and to which the male attends, adding or removing litter to regulate the internal heat while the eggs develop. However, some (3 species) bury their eggs in other ways; there are burrow-nesters which use geothermal heat, and others which simply rely on the heat of the sun warming the sand. Some (6 species) use a combination of incubation strategies depending on the local environment.

Although the Australian brushturkey was thought to exhibit temperature-dependent sex determination, this was later proven false; temperature does, however, affect embryo mortality and resulting offspring sex ratios. The nonsocial nature of their incubation raises questions as to how the hatchlings come to recognise other members of their species, which is due to imprinting in other members of the order Galliformes. Research suggests an instinctive visual recognition of specific movement patterns is made by the individual species of megapode.

This cross-section of a megapode mound shows a layer of sand (up to 1 m thick) used for insulation, an egg chamber, and a layer of rotting compost. The egg chamber is kept at a constant 33 °C (91 °F) by opening and closing air vents in the insulation layer, while heat comes from the compost below.

Megapode chicks do not have an egg tooth; they use their powerful claws to break out of the egg, and then tunnel their way up to the surface of the mound, lying on their backs and scratching at the sand and vegetable matter. Similar to other superprecocial birds, they hatch fully feathered and active, already able to fly and live independently from their parents. In megapodes, superprecociality apparently evolved secondarily from brooding and at least loose parental care as more typical in Galliformes. Eggs previously assigned to Genyornis have been reassigned to giant megapode species. Some dietary and chronological data previously assigned to dromornithids may instead be assigned to the giant megapodes.

Megapodes share some similarities to the extinct enantiornithes in terms of their superprecocial life cycle, though also several differences. (Note: "These feather traces and the plumage in HPG-15-1 strongly suggest that members of the Enantiornithes were born fully fledged and capable of flight soon after hatching, somewhat resembling the super-precocial megapodes, the only group of neornithines in which neonates are similarly born fledged and capable of flight (Zhou and Zhang, 2004; Jones and Göth, 2008; Xing et al., 2017). Megapodes do not fly immediately, requiring nearly two days to dig themselves out of their mounds during which they preen off their feather sheaths and let their feathers dry (Jones and Göth, 2008). Similarly, hatchling enantiornithines would have had to wait until their feather sheaths were removed and their feathers dry before attempting flight. Although ecological and behavioural differences clearly exist between enantiornithines and megapodes (e.g., enantiornithines were arboreal and not mound-nesters), megapodes represent the precocial extreme in extant neornithines and thus the closest analogue for enantiornithine development, for which all evidence indicates a form of extreme precociality (Elzanowski, 1981; Zhou and Zhang, 2004; Xing et al., 2017).")

== Species ==
There are twenty-one living species in seven genera, four of which are monotypic genera. Although the evolutionary relationships between the Megapodiidae are especially uncertain, the morphological groups are clear:

=== Phylogeny ===
- - Megapodiidae
    - - - Macrocephalon – maleo
        - - Eulipoa – Moluccan megapode
          - Megapodius – scrubfowl (12 species)
      - - Leipoa – malleefowl
        - - Talegalla – brushturkeys (3 species)
          - - Alectura – Australian brushturkey
            - Aepypodius – brushturkeys (2 species)

Phylogeny of the Megapodiidae based a study by Chen, Hosner, Dittmann, et al. (2021). The numbers of species are from the IOU list by Gill, Donsker, & Rasmussen.

=== Taxonomy ===
Image	Genus	Common name	Scientific name
	Macrocephalon, S. Müller, 1846	Maleo	Macrocephalon maleo
	Eulipoa, (Note: Sometimes included in Megapodius) Ogilvie-Grant, 1893	Moluccan megapode	Eulipoa wallacei
	Megapodius, Gaimard, 1823	Tongan megapode	Megapodius pritchardii
	Megapodius, Gaimard, 1823	Micronesian megapode	Megapodius laperouse
	Megapodius, Gaimard, 1823	Nicobar megapode	Megapodius nicobariensis
	Megapodius, Gaimard, 1823	Philippine megapode	Megapodius cumingii
	Megapodius, Gaimard, 1823	Sula megapode	Megapodius bernsteinii
	Megapodius, Gaimard, 1823	Tanimbar megapode	Megapodius tenimberensis
	Megapodius, Gaimard, 1823	Dusky megapode	Megapodius freycinet
	Megapodius, Gaimard, 1823	Biak scrubfowl	Megapodius geelvinkianus
	Megapodius, Gaimard, 1823	Melanesian megapode	Megapodius eremita
	Megapodius, Gaimard, 1823	Vanuatu megapode	Megapodius layardi
	Megapodius, Gaimard, 1823	New Guinea scrubfowl	Megapodius decollatus
	Megapodius, Gaimard, 1823	Orange-footed scrubfowl	Megapodius reinwardt
	Leipoa, Gould, 1840	Malleefowl	Leipoa ocellata
	Alectura, Latham, 1824	Australian brushturkey	Alectura lathami
	Aepypodius, Oustalet, 1880	Wattled brushturkey	Aepypodius arfakianus
	Aepypodius, Oustalet, 1880	Waigeo brushturkey	Aepypodius bruijnii
	Talegalla, Lesson, 1828	Red-billed brushturkey	Talegalla cuvieri
	Talegalla, Lesson, 1828	Black-billed brushturkey	Talegalla fuscirostris
	Talegalla, Lesson, 1828	Collared brushturkey	Talegalla jobiensis

=== Extinct megapodes ===
The following genera and all species in them are extinct (with the exception of the Megapodius genus, which is still extant, but contains many extinct species):

Image	Genus	Common name	Scientific name
	Megapodius, Gaimard, 1823	†Pile-builder scrubfowl	†Megapodius molistructor Balouet & Olson 1989
	Megapodius, Gaimard, 1823	†Viti Levu scrubfowl	†Megapodius amissus Worthy 2000
	Megapodius, Gaimard, 1823	†Consumed scrubfowl	†Megapodius alimentum Steatman 1989
	Megapodius, Gaimard, 1823		†Megapodius rokusi Meijer et al. 2026
	Megapodius, Gaimard, 1823		†Megapodius andamanensis Walter 1980 nomen dubium (egg fossils)
	Megapodius, Gaimard, 1823		†Megapodius burnabyi Gray 1861 nomen dubium (egg fossils)
	Megapodius, Gaimard, 1823	†Raoul Island scrubfowl	M. sp.
	Megapodius, Gaimard, 1823	†'Eua scrubfowl (small-footed megapode)	M. sp.
	Megapodius, Gaimard, 1823	†Lifuka scrubfowl	M. sp.
	Megapodius, Gaimard, 1823	†Stout Tongan megapode	M. sp.
	Megapodius, Gaimard, 1823	†Large Solomon Islands megapode	M. sp.
	Megapodius, Gaimard, 1823	†New Caledonia megapode	M. sp.
	Megapodius, Gaimard, 1823	†Loyalty megapode	M. sp.
	Megapodius, Gaimard, 1823	†New Ireland scrubfowl (large Bismarck's megapode)	M. sp.
	†Progura, De Vis 1888		†Progura gallinacea, Pleistocene
	†Progura, De Vis 1888		†Progura campestris, Pleistocene
	†Latagallina		†Latagallina naracoortensis, (Note: Formerly Progura naracoortensis) Pleistocene
	†Latagallina		†Latagallina olsoni, Pleistocene
	†Mwalau Worthy et al. 2015		†Mwalau walterlinii Worthy et al. 2015 (Vanuatu)
	†Ngawupodius Boles & Ivison 1999		†Ngawupodius minya Boles & Ivison 1999
	†Garrdimalga, incertae sedis		†Garrdimalga mcnamarai, Pleistocene

== Human uses ==
The particular requirement of some species of megapode who incubate their eggs in soil heated by volcanoes, has led to the creation of relatively small nesting areas which need to accommodate thousands of birds. The massive seasonal accumulation of eggs in these areas, and their high yolk to white ratio, has resulted in them becoming a major source of food for humans.

In their native Oceania, indigenous peoples protect their nesting sites, as their eggs are considered to be delicacies. Their eggs are about twice the size of chicken eggs and the yolks are roughly four times as massive. Among the peoples who live near megapode habitats, megapode eggs are regularly gifted as signs of loyalty, friendship and respect.

The context of egg harvesting by humans has undergone recent cultural changes. While it was formerly regulated by ritual conventions which restricted the harvest to particular castes and the consumption to local communities, since the 1950's the limitations have disintegrated. The egg harvest reached its peak in the 1970s, when it was estimated that between 4-8.9 million Melanesian megapode eggs were harvested annually, in Pokili alone. As of 2000, out of the 131 original nesting sites, 42 were abandoned, 38 were severely threatened, 34 were threatened, 12 were of unknown status and only 5 were considered viable. Nine megapode species are considered at risk of extinction.

== See also ==
- List of recently extinct birds
- Late Quaternary prehistoric birds
- List of fossil bird genera
