= William Thomas Pritchard =

British consul and adventurer

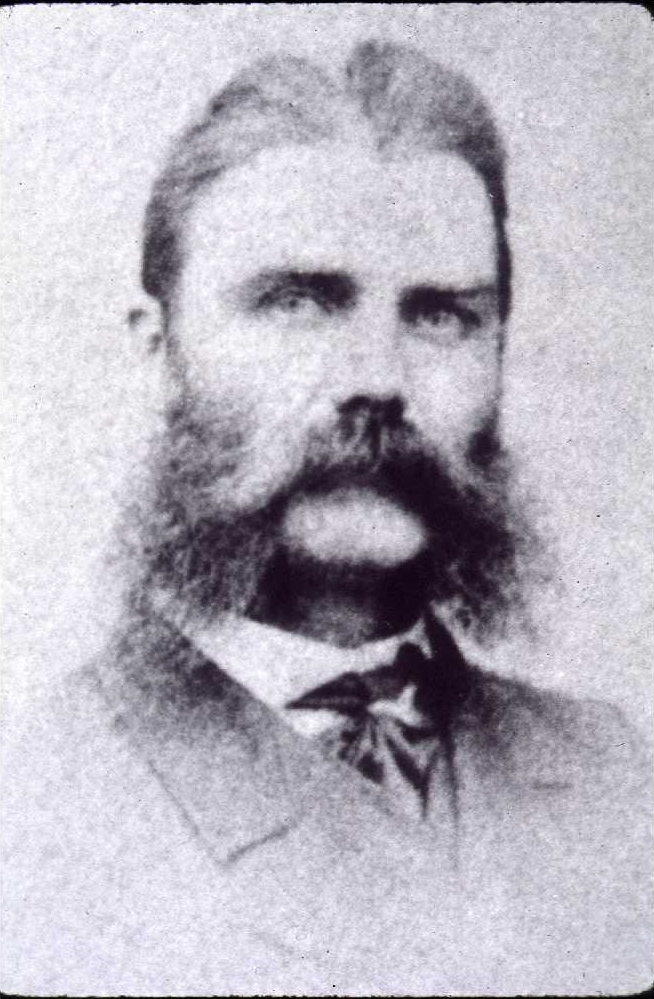

William Thomas Pritchard (13 October 1829 – 1 November 1907) was a British consul and adventurer.

Pritchard was born in Papeete, Tahiti, the son of George Pritchard and Eliza Aileen. He was educated in Britain before returning to join his father, the British consul in Samoa. In Samoa, he acquired an exceptional knowledge of the Polynesian languages and traditions. In 1858 he was appointed the first British consul at Fiji, and in the same year traveled to England with an offer from Seru Epenisa Cakobau to cede Fiji to the British crown. He was dismissed from his post in 1863.

He is commemorated in the name of the Polynesian megapode Megapodius pritchardii and the plant genus Pritchardia.

== Publications ==
- Pritchard, William Thomas (1866). Polynesian Reminiscences; or, Life in the South Pacific Islands. London: Chapman and Hall. ISBN 9780712902878.
