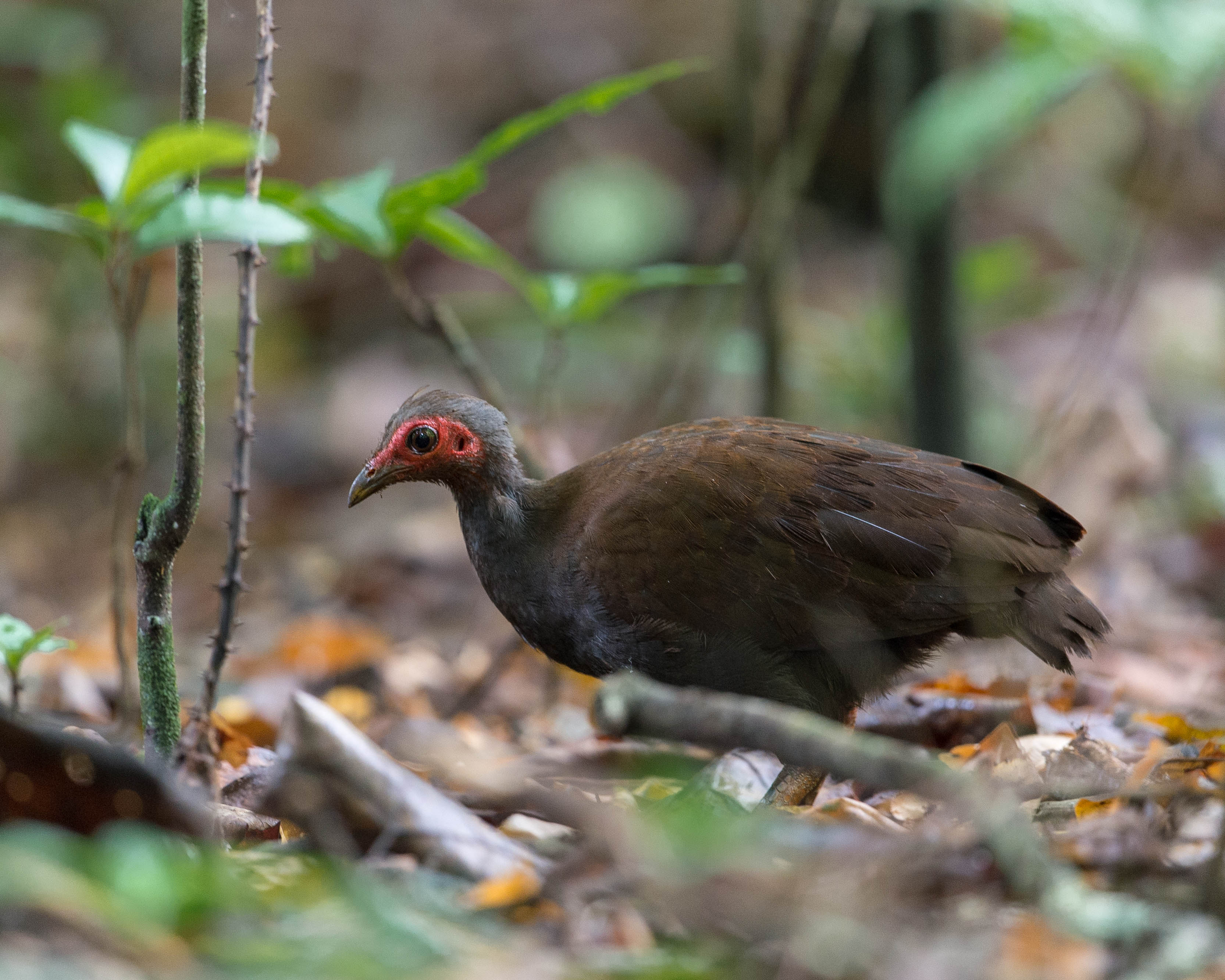
- M. c. gilbertii in Indonesia

Conservation status
- Least Concern (IUCN 3.1)

Scientific classification
- Kingdom: Animalia
- Phylum: Chordata
- Class: Aves
- Order: Galliformes
- Family: Megapodiidae
- Genus: Megapodius
- Species: M. cumingii

Binomial name
- Megapodius cumingii Dillwyn, 1853

Subspecies
- M. c. dillwyni (Tweeddale, 1878); M. c. gilbertii (G.R. Gray, 1862); M. c. cumingii (Dillwyn, 1853); M. c. pusillus (Tweeddale, 1878); M. c. sanghirensis (Schlegel, 1880); M. c. tabon (Hachisuka, 1931); M. c. talautensis (Roselaar, 1994)

= Philippine megapode =

Species of bird

The Philippine megapode (Megapodius cumingii), also known as the Philippine scrubfowl or the Tabon scrubfowl, is a species of bird in the family Megapodiidae. It is found in the Philippines, northeastern Borneo, and Sulawesi. It has a wide range of natural habitats which include tropical dry forest, tropical moist lowland forest, tropical moist montane forest and small islands. The species was named after the collector Hugh Cuming.

== Description and taxonomy ==
It was formerly conspecific with the Dusky megapode but is differentiated with a lighter brown plummage and legs and with prominent red facial skin.

=== Subspecies ===
Seven subspecies are recognized:

- M. c.cumingii – Found on Palawan and small islands North of Borneo
- M. c.dillwyni – Found on Luzon, Mindoro, Marinduque and proximate islands
- M. c.pusillus – Found on Masbate, Cebu, Negros, Bohol and West Mindanao
- M. c.tabon – Found on East Mindanao
- M. c.gilbertii – Found on Sulawesi and Togian Islands
- M. c.talautensis – Found on Talaud Islands
- M. c.sanghirensis – Found on Sangihe Islands

== Ecology and behavior ==
Feeds on insects, mostly larvae, beetles, termites, worms and snails. Also known to eat fallen fruits and seeds.

Has different breeding seasons per subspecies, known to breed year round on Sabah, March to May in Sulawesi and June to August on Palawan. Nest building habits also differ. It is mostly across most of its range but is a burrow nester in Palawan, Negros and Panay. In Palawan and Sabah, females are known to communally nest.

== Habitat and conservation status ==
This species occurs in forested zones of hills and mountains, beach forest, coastal scrub, small islands and even agricultural areas.

The International Union for Conservation of Nature has assessed it as a Least-concern species but was formerly considered to near threatened. Despite not being threatened, its population is declning due to habitat loss, introduced species which prey on its eggs, egg collection and hunting from humans.
