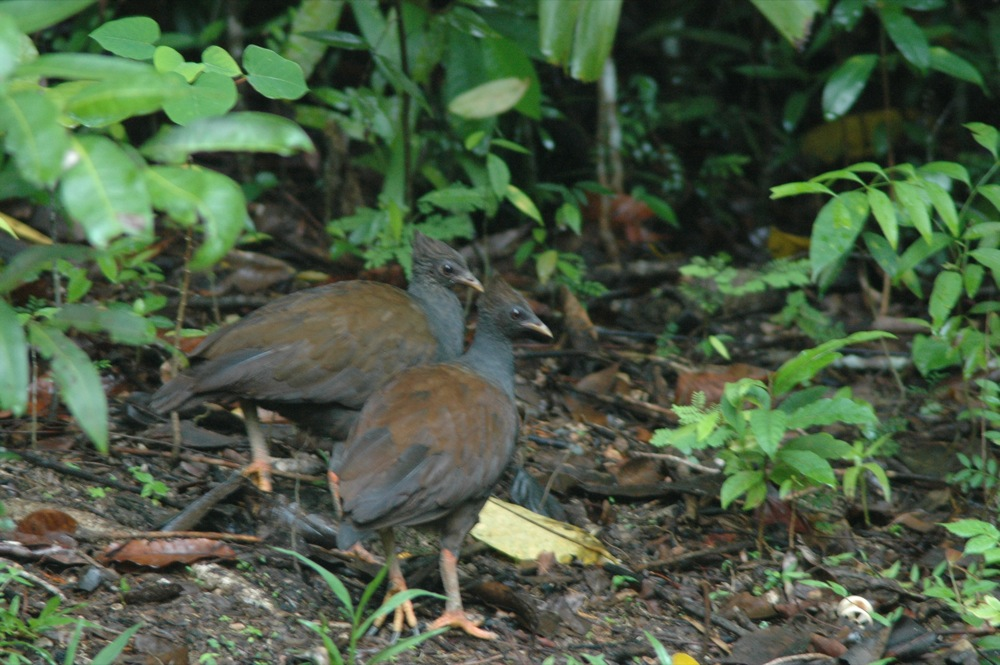
- Orange-footed scrubfowl

Scientific classification
- Kingdom: Animalia
- Phylum: Chordata
- Class: Aves
- Order: Galliformes
- Family: Megapodiidae
- Genus: Megapodius; Gaimard, 1823

Type species
- Megapodius freycinet Gaimard, 1823

Species
- 14 total, 12 extant, see text.

= Scrubfowl =

Genus of birds

The scrubfowl are mound-builders (stocky, medium-large chicken-like birds with small heads and large feet in the family Megapodiidae) in the genus Megapodius. They are found from Southeast Asia to northern Australia and islands in the west Pacific.

They do not incubate their eggs with their body heat in the orthodox way, but bury them. They are best known for building a massive mound of decaying vegetation, which the male attends, adding or removing litter to regulate the internal heat while the eggs hatch.

== Taxonomy ==
The genus Megapodius was introduced in 1823 by the French naturalist Joseph Gaimard. He listed several species in his new genus but in 1840 the English naturalist Prideaux John Selby designated the type species as Megapodius freycinet, the dusky megapode. The genus name combines the Ancient Greek μεγας (megas), μεγαλη (megalē) meaning "big" with πους (pous), ποδος (podos) meaning "foot".

The genus contains the following 12 species:

Genus Megapodius – Gaimard, 1823 – twelve species
Common name	Scientific name and subspecies	Range	Size and ecology	IUCN status and estimated population
Tongan megapode	Megapodius pritchardii Gray, GR, 1864	Endemic to Tonga, restricted for many years to Niuafo'ou; formerly across most of Tonga, Samoa and Niue	Size: Habitat: Tropical moist lowland forests; on Niuafo'ou most common on the central caldera Diet:	VU
Micronesian megapode	Megapodius laperouse Gaimard, 1823 Two subspecies: M. l. senex (Hartlaub, 1868); M. l. laperouse (Gaimard, 1823)	Palau and the Northern Mariana Islands; extirpated from Guam and Rota, with a remnant population possibly on Saipan and Tinian	Size: 38 cm (15 in) Habitat: Thick forest; thickets and scrublands of low outlying islands, and inland on higher ground on larger islands Diet: Omnivorous, eating a large variety of foods from the forest floor; chicks feed on grass shoots and insects	NT 2,000–2,500 individuals
Nicobar megapode	Megapodius nicobariensis Blyth, 1846 Two subspecies: M. n. abbotti (Oberholser, 1919); M. n. nicobariensis (Blyth, 1846)	Endemic to the Nicobar Islands, India	Size: Habitat: Thick jungle adjacent to the sea shore, coming out onto the shore after dark; builds nest mounds generally close to the coast Diet: Omnivorous: seeds (especially Macaranga peltata), insects, snails, crustaceans and reptiles, foraging by scratching and raking debris on the ground; in pairs or small groups	VU Stable but small; 750–1,500 mature individuals, after a 66–75% reduction following the 2004 tsunami
Philippine megapode	Megapodius cumingii Dillwyn, 1853 Seven subspecies: M. c. dillwyni (Tweeddale, 1878); M. c. gilbertii (Gray, GR, 1862); M. c. cumingii (Dillwyn, 1853); M. c. pusillus (Tweeddale, 1878); M. c. sanghirensis (Schlegel, 1880); M. c. tabon (Hachisuka, 1931); M. c. talautensis (Roselaar, 1994)	The Philippines, northeastern Borneo and Sulawesi	Size: Habitat: Tropical dry forest, tropical moist lowland forest, tropical moist montane forest and small islands; forested zones of hills and mountains, beach forest, coastal scrub and agricultural areas Diet: Mostly insects (larvae, beetles, termites), worms and snails; also fallen fruits and seeds	LC Declining, due to habitat loss, egg-eating introduced species, egg collection and hunting
Sula megapode	Megapodius bernsteinii Schlegel, 1866	Banggai and Sula Islands, between Sulawesi and the Maluku Islands, Indonesia	Size: 30–35 cm (11.8–13.8 in) Habitat: Subtropical or tropical dry forest, moist lowland forest, mangrove forest and moist shrubland; lowland forests and dense scrub near forests and farmland, up to 450 m (1,500 ft); area of occupancy about 4,500 km² (1,700 sq mi) Diet: Usually forages in pairs; mainly roots and invertebrates, including earthworms	VU Declining
Tanimbar megapode	Megapodius tenimberensis Sclater, PL, 1883	Endemic to the Tanimbar Islands, Indonesia	Size: Habitat: A range of forest and scrub habitats Diet: Seeds, fallen fruit and terrestrial invertebrates	VU
Dusky megapode	Megapodius freycinet Gaimard, 1823 Four subspecies: M. f. forsteni (Gray, GR, 1847); M. f. oustaleti (Roselaar, 1994); M. f. quoyii (Gray, GR, 1862); M. f. freycinet (Gaimard, 1823)	Maluku and Raja Ampat Islands, Indonesia	Size: About 41 cm (16 in) Habitat: Forests and swamps, including mangroves Diet:	LC Fairly common throughout a large part of its range
Biak scrubfowl	Megapodius geelvinkianus Meyer, 1874	Biak, Mios Korwar, Numfor, Manim and Mios Num in the West Papua region of Indonesia	Size: 36 cm (14 in) Habitat: Subtropical or tropical moist lowland forest and moist shrubland Diet:	NT
Melanesian megapode	Megapodius eremita Hartlaub, 1868	Bismarck Archipelago and the Solomon Islands	Size: 34–39 cm (13–15 in) Habitat: Breeds on sandy beaches warmed by the sun, geothermal sites and soils with decaying organic matter; forages in lowland rainforest with large trees, an open understorey, thick leaf litter and deep soils Diet: Omnivorous: fruits, seeds (including Canarium indicum nuts) and small invertebrates (insects, snails, millipedes, earthworms); scratches the forest floor with its large feet, alone, in pairs or in small groups	LC Fairly common
Vanuatu megapode	Megapodius layardi Tristram, 1879	Vanuatu	Size: Habitat: Subtropical or tropical moist lowland forest Diet:	LC
New Guinea scrubfowl	Megapodius decollatus Oustalet, 1878	New Guinea, mostly the northern half	Size: Habitat: Subtropical or tropical moist lowland forest and moist montane forest Diet:	LC
Orange-footed scrubfowl	Megapodius reinwardt Dumont, 1823 Six subspecies: M. r. buruensis (Stresemann, 1914); M. r. castanonotus (Mayr, 1938); M. r. reinwardt (Dumont, 1823); M. r. macgillivrayi (Gray, GR, 1862); M. r. tumulus (Gould, 1842); M. r. yorki (Mathews, 1929)	Many islands in the Lesser Sunda Islands, southern New Guinea and northern Australia	Size: Habitat: A range of forest and scrub habitats; has colonised many small islands, and is prolific in suburban Darwin gardens Diet: Seeds, fallen fruit and terrestrial invertebrates	LC Stable

Four extinct species have been described from sub-fossil remains:

- †Megapodius molistructor (Pile-builder scrubfowl)
- †Megapodius amissus (Viti Levu scrubfowl)
- †Megapodius alimentum (Consumed scrubfowl )
- †Megapodius rokusi

Other fossils include:

- †M. andamanensis Walter 1980 nomen dubium (egg fossils)
- †M. burnabyi Gray 1861 nomen dubium (egg fossils)
- †Raoul Island scrubfowl, M. sp.
- †'Eua scrubfowl (small-footed megapode), M. sp.
- †Lifuka scrubfowl, M. sp.
- †Stout Tongan megapode, M. sp.
- †Large Solomon Islands megapode, M. sp.
- †New Caledonia megapode, M. sp.
- †Loyalty megapode, M. sp.
- †New Ireland scrubfowl (large Bismarck's megapode), M. sp.

In all of the above, the name "scrubfowl" is sometimes exchanged with "megapode". Traditionally, most have been listed as subspecies of M. freycinet, but today all major authorities consider this incorrect. Nevertheless, there are unresolved issues within the genus, and for example the taxon forstenii has been considered a subspecies of M. freycinet, a subspecies of M. cumingii, or a monotypic species. An additional species, the Moluccan megapode, has sometimes been placed in Megapodius, but today most place it in the genus Eulipoa instead. The maleo is also associated with these genera, and together the three form a group.
