= Megapodius rokusi =

Megapodius rokusi Temporal range: Late Pleistocene

Scientific classification
- Kingdom: Animalia
- Phylum: Chordata
- Class: Aves
- Order: Galliformes
- Family: Megapodiidae
- Genus: Megapodius
- Species: †M. rokusi

Binomial name
- †Megapodius rokusi Meijer et. al, 2026

Extinct species of bird

Megapodius rokusi is an extinct species of megapode from the Late Pleistocene Liang Bua of Flores, Indonesia. It was described from a partial tarsometatarsus which derives from sediments dated to ca 190–120 thousand years ago. It was the largest species of the genus known so far, with an estimated body mass around 3.9 kg, which is slightly lighter than the contemporary extinct giant Australian megapodes like Progura.
