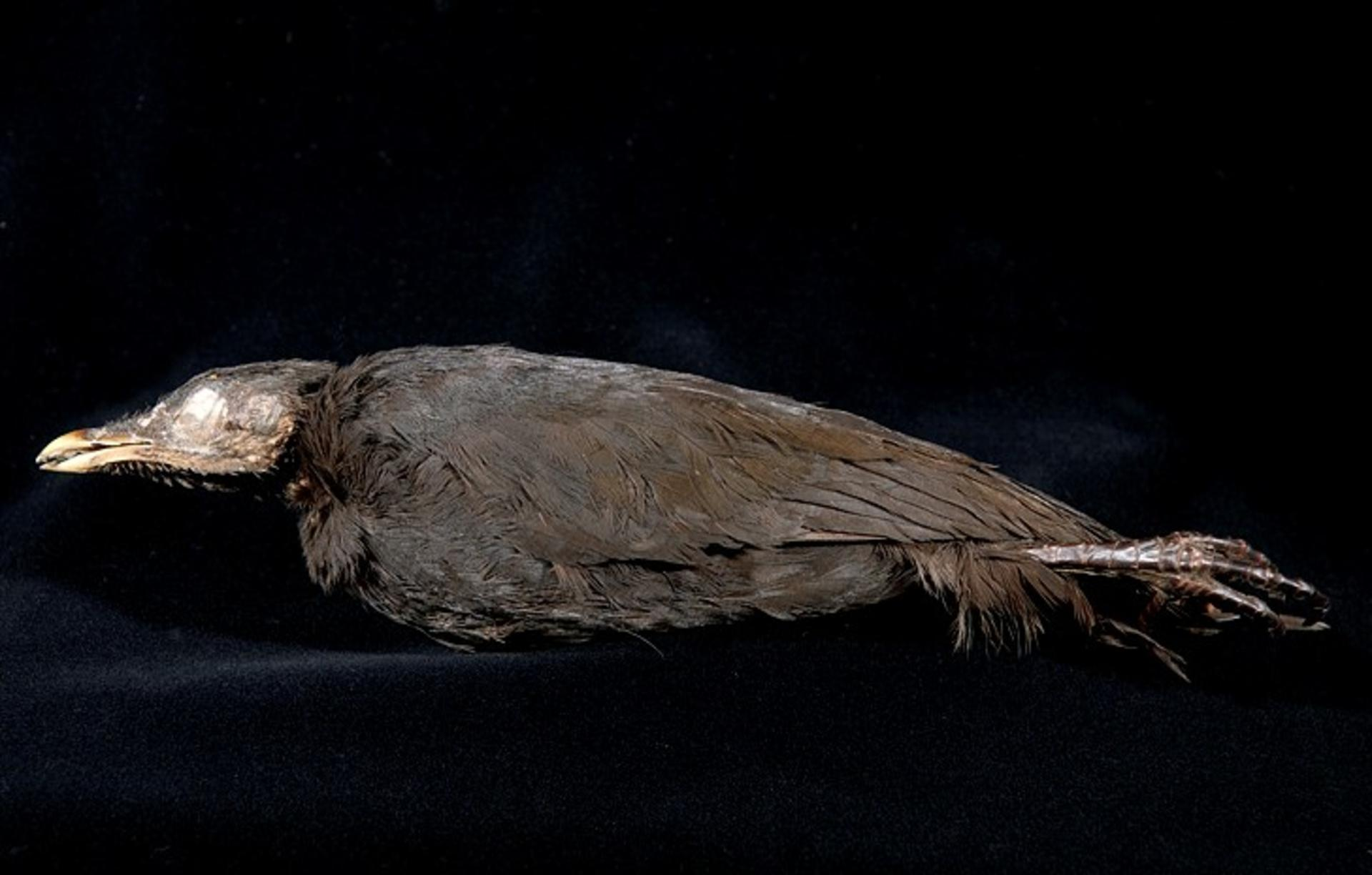

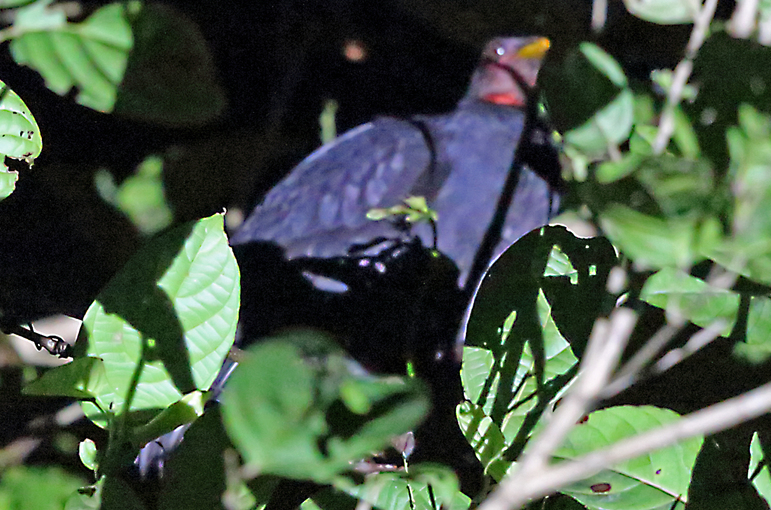

Conservation status
- Near Threatened (IUCN 3.1)

Scientific classification
- Kingdom: Animalia
- Phylum: Chordata
- Class: Aves
- Order: Galliformes
- Family: Megapodiidae
- Genus: Megapodius
- Species: M. geelvinkianus

Binomial name
- Megapodius geelvinkianus Meyer, 1874

Synonyms
- Geelvink Scrubfowl

= Biak scrubfowl =

Species of bird

The Biak scrubfowl or Biak megapode (Megapodius geelvinkianus) is a species of bird in the family Megapodiidae. It is found only on the islands of Biak, Mios Korwar, Numfor, Manim and Mios Num in the West Papua region of Indonesia.

== Description ==
This bird measures 36 cm (14 in) long. Its plumage is largely dark grey. It has a slight crest and a reddish or bluish face. Legs are red or dark grey.

== Habitat ==
Its natural habitats are subtropical or tropical moist lowland forest and subtropical or tropical moist shrubland. It is threatened by habitat loss.

Some taxonomists consider this to be a subspecies of the dusky megapode, others as a subspecies of the orange-footed scrubfowl, but is increasingly looked at as a distinct species.
