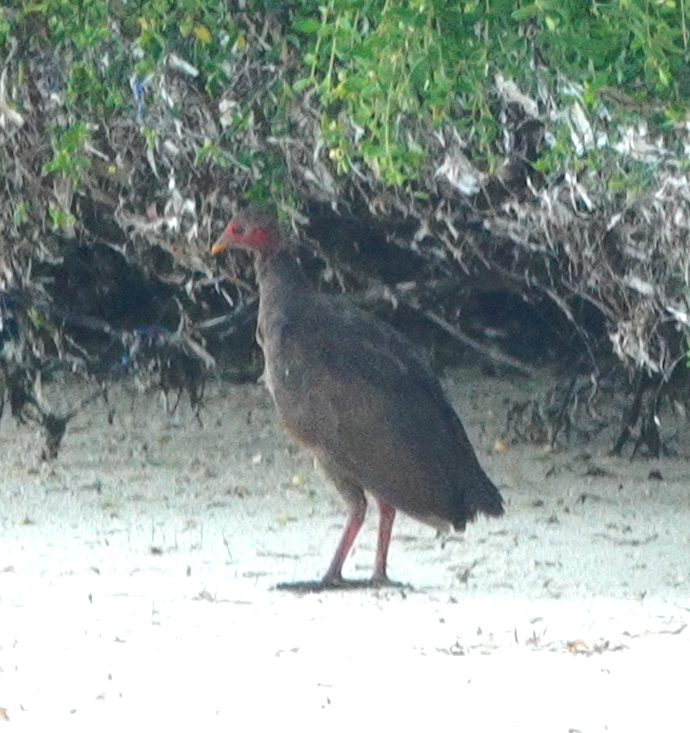

Conservation status
- Vulnerable (IUCN 3.1)

Scientific classification
- Kingdom: Animalia
- Phylum: Chordata
- Class: Aves
- Order: Galliformes
- Family: Megapodiidae
- Genus: Megapodius
- Species: M. tenimberensis

Binomial name
- Megapodius tenimberensis Sclater, PL, 1883

= Tanimbar megapode =

Species of bird

The Tanimbar megapode or Tanimbar scrubfowl (Megapodius tenimberensis) is a small megapode endemic to the Tanimbar Islands of Indonesia. It is sometimes considered to be a subspecies of the orange-footed scrubfowl, Megapodius reinwardt.

It is a terrestrial bird the size of a domestic chicken, which is found in a range of forest and scrub habitats.

It feeds on seeds, fallen fruit and terrestrial invertebrates. Like other megapodes, it nests in large mounds of sand, leaf litter and other debris where the heat generated by the decomposition of organic material serves to incubate the eggs.
