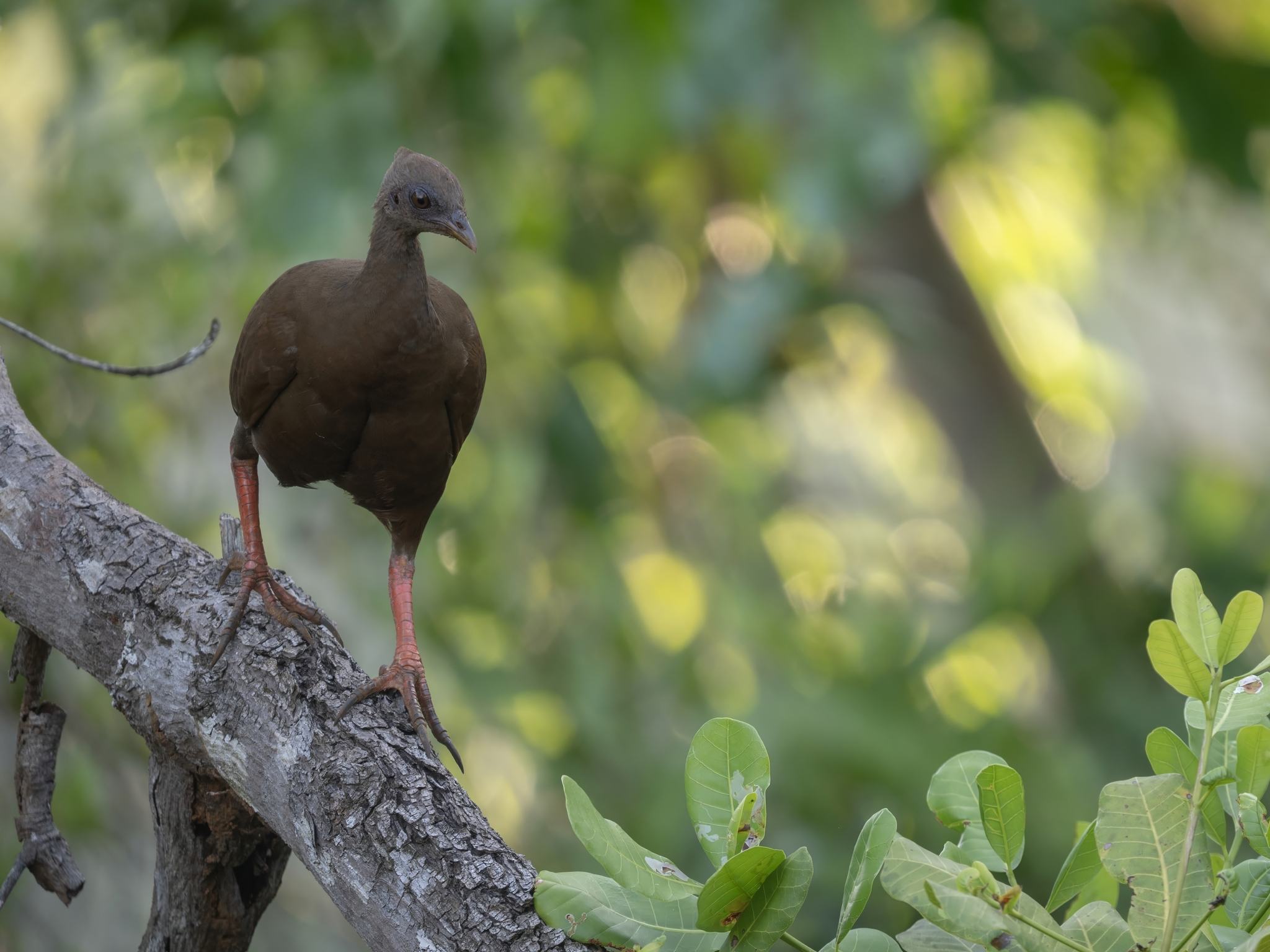

Conservation status
- Vulnerable (IUCN 3.1)

Scientific classification
- Kingdom: Animalia
- Phylum: Chordata
- Class: Aves
- Order: Galliformes
- Family: Megapodiidae
- Genus: Megapodius
- Species: M. bernsteinii

Binomial name
- Megapodius bernsteinii Schlegel, 1866

= Sula megapode =

Species of bird

The Sula megapode or Sula scrubfowl (Megapodius bernsteinii) is a species of bird in the family Megapodiidae. It is found only in the Banggai and Sula Islands between Sulawesi and the Maluku Islands in Indonesia, where its habitats are subtropical or tropical dry forest, subtropical or tropical moist lowland forest, subtropical or tropical mangrove forest, and subtropical or tropical moist shrubland. It is threatened by habitat destruction.

== Description ==
The Sula scrubfowl is a medium-sized ground-dwelling bird growing to a length of between 30 and 35 cm (12 and 14 in). The sexes are similar in appearance, being a uniform reddish-brown colour and having a short, pointed crest and long red or orange-red legs and feet.

== Distribution ==
It is known only from the Banggai and Sula Islands, groups of islands between Sulawesi and the Maluku Islands in Indonesia. Habitats include lowland forests as well as dense scrub near forests and farmland, at altitudes of up to 450 m (1,500 ft).

== Ecology ==
The species usually forages in pairs, but on one occasion, a group of five birds moving about and feeding together was recorded, perhaps an adult pair and their young. The diet mainly consists of roots and invertebrates, including earthworms.

Very little was known of the breeding habits of this bird so a study was undertaken in 1991. Nine birds were in the vicinity of the study site, four pairs and a single bird. There was much vocalisation mostly in the form of duetting and choruses, with all the birds joining in synchrony. Calling took place in the mornings and to a lesser extent in the afternoons indicating the presence of birds close to the nest. The study nest was a cone-shaped mound in a fallow cultivated field close to scrub and forest remnants. It was built over two rotting logs and was constructed of sand and clay. Eggs are laid by the female in the mound and covered with soil (this was not observed). During the month-long observation period, a bird (or sometimes two) would approach the mound on most days and rake the surface with its claws. The bird faced downhill and scratched the surface with alternate feet, working in one instance for 116 minutes. Another bird could sometimes be heard in the nearby undergrowth. The scratching bird was alert to danger, freezing at unexpected noises, and peering round and responding to the warning cries of the blue-backed parrot (Tanygnathus sumatranus) and the spangled drongo (Dicrurus bracteatus). Monitor lizards (Varanus) sometimes tried to raid the nest, usually after an adult bird had been raking, but had little success while the researchers were watching.

== Status ==
M. bernsteinii faces a number of threats and its total population is thought to be declining. Its natural forest habitat is threatened by logging and is being converted into agricultural land, the birds are hunted and their eggs collected for human consumption, and they and their young are preyed on by feral cats and dogs. The total area of occupancy of this bird is only about 4,500 km^{2} (1,700 mi^{2}) and the International Union for Conservation of Nature has assessed its conservation status as being "vulnerable".
