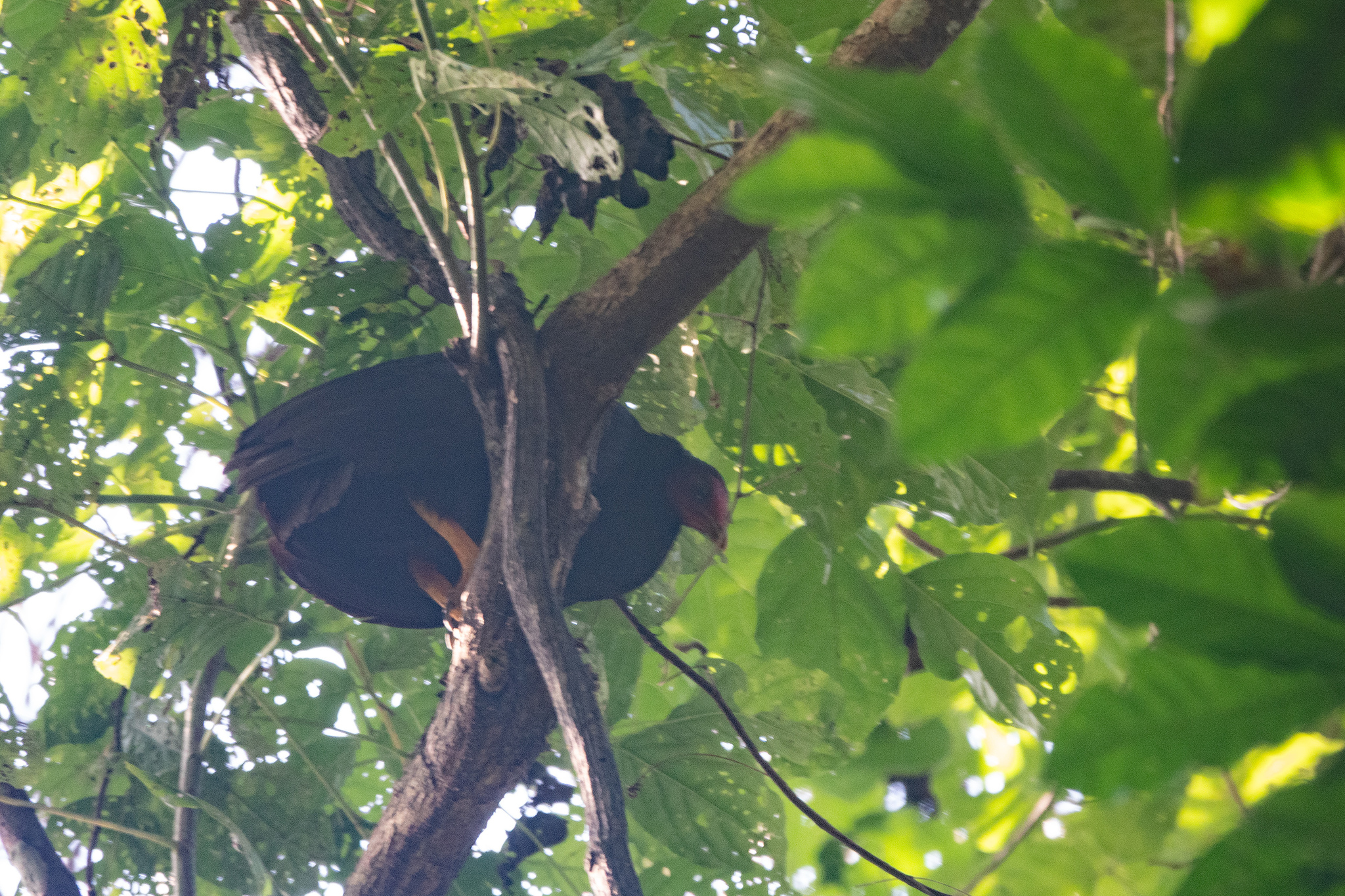

Conservation status
- Least Concern (IUCN 3.1)

Scientific classification
- Kingdom: Animalia
- Phylum: Chordata
- Class: Aves
- Order: Galliformes
- Family: Megapodiidae
- Genus: Megapodius
- Species: M. layardi

Binomial name
- Megapodius layardi Tristram, 1879

= Vanuatu megapode =

Species of bird

The Vanuatu megapode or Vanuatu scrubfowl (Megapodius layardi) is a species of bird in the family Megapodiidae. It was formerly known as the New Hebrides scrubfowl. It is found only in Vanuatu. Its natural habitat is subtropical or tropical moist lowland forest. The species is threatened by habitat loss and egg collecting.

== Taxonomy ==
Two syntype specimens of Megapodius layardi Tristram (Ibis, 1879, p. 194.) are held in the collections of National Museums Liverpool at World Museum, with accession numbers T9758 (male adult) and T9759 (female adult). The specimens were collected in Vate Island (Efate) in July 1877 and September 1877, respectively, by Edgar Leopold Layard and came to the Liverpool national collection via Canon Henry Baker Tristram's collection which was purchased in 1896. There are three further syntypes in the bird collection at the Natural History Museum at Tring.
