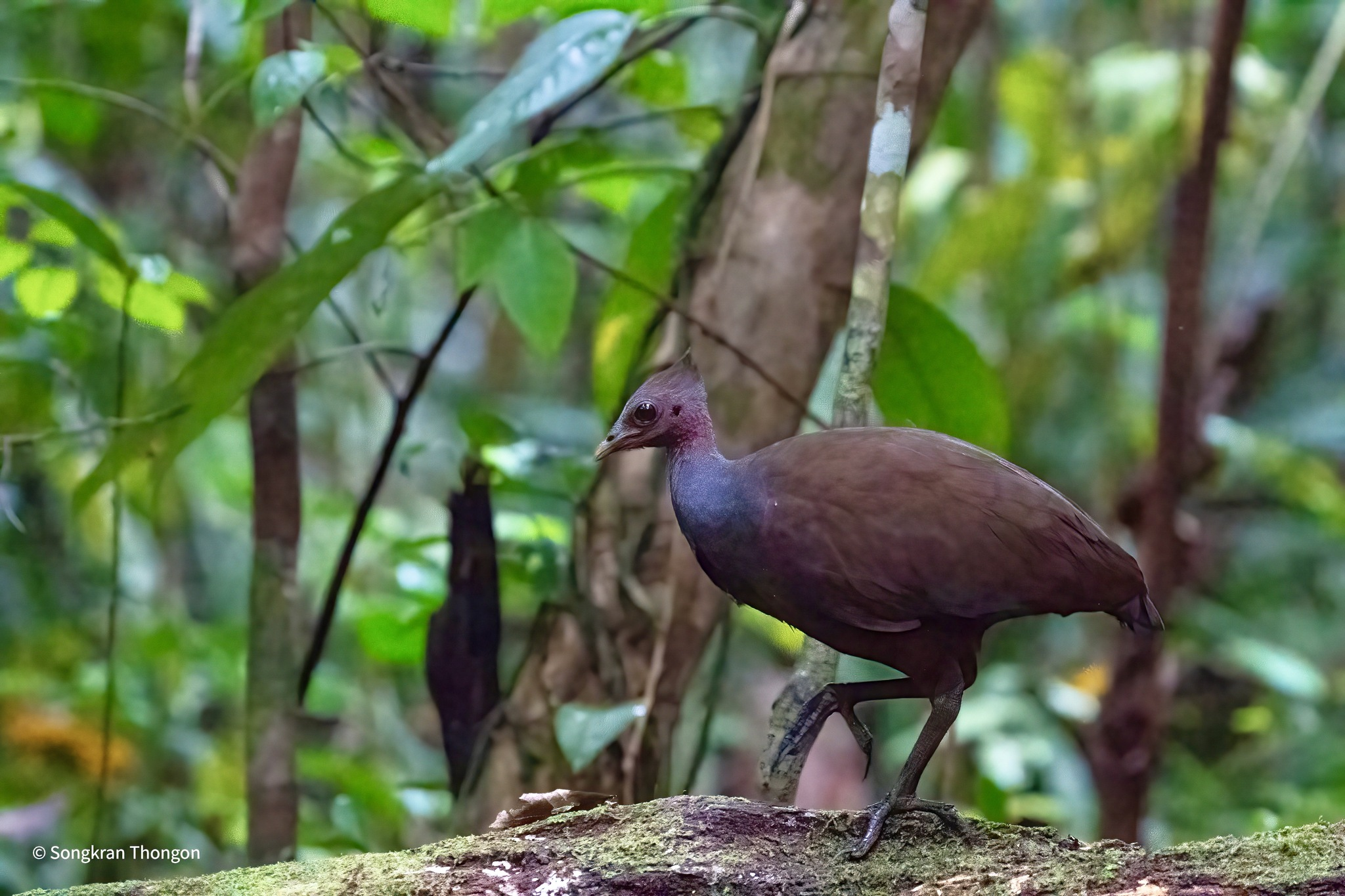

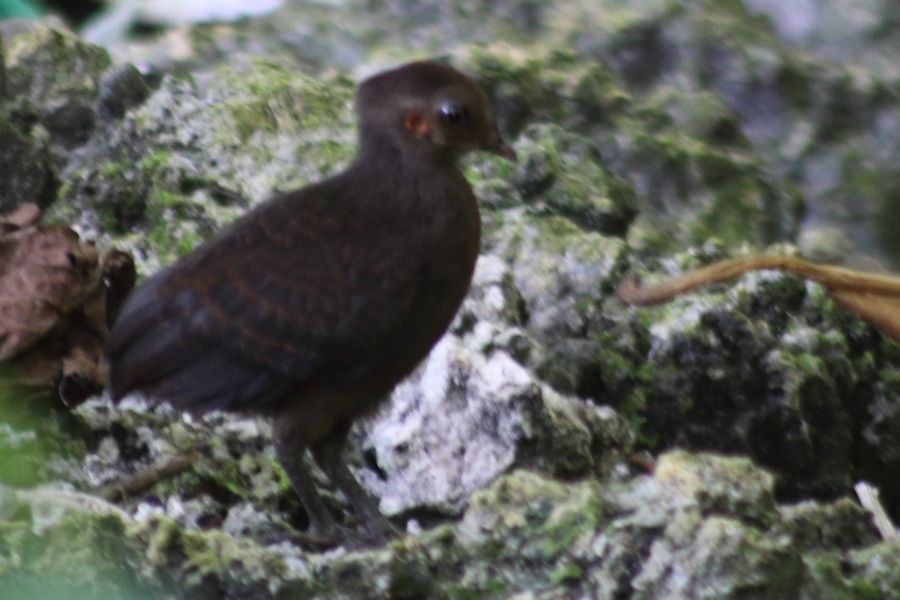
- Juvenile

Conservation status
- Least Concern (IUCN 3.1)

Scientific classification
- Kingdom: Animalia
- Phylum: Chordata
- Class: Aves
- Order: Galliformes
- Family: Megapodiidae
- Genus: Megapodius
- Species: M. decollatus

Binomial name
- Megapodius decollatus Oustalet, 1878

= New Guinea scrubfowl =

Species of bird

The New Guinea scrubfowl or New Guinea megapode (Megapodius decollatus) is a species of bird in the family Megapodiidae. It is found in New Guinea, mostly in the northern half. Its natural habitats are subtropical or tropical moist lowland forest and subtropical or tropical moist montane forest. This species was formerly known as Megapodius affinis but Roselaar, 1994 showed that Megapodius affinis A. B. Meyer, 1874 refers to M. reinwardt.
