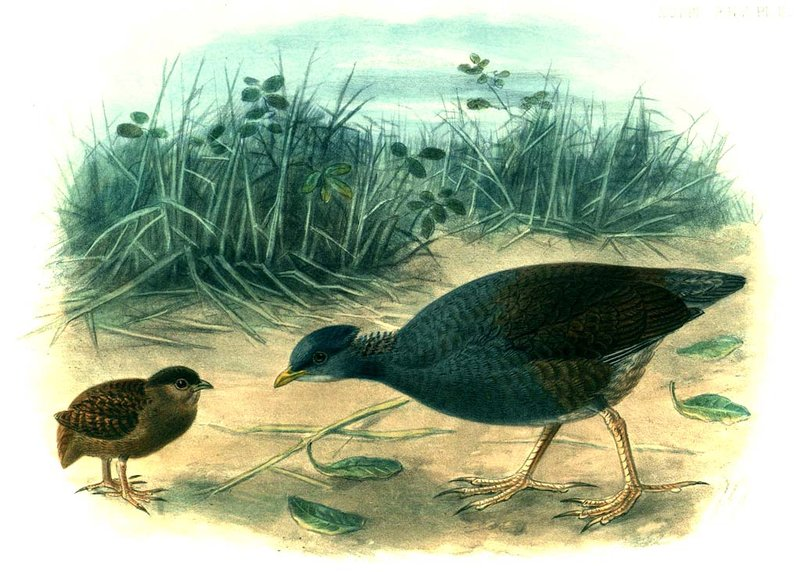

Conservation status
- Vulnerable (IUCN 3.1)

Scientific classification
- Kingdom: Animalia
- Phylum: Chordata
- Class: Aves
- Order: Galliformes
- Family: Megapodiidae
- Genus: Megapodius
- Species: M. pritchardii

Binomial name
- Megapodius pritchardii Gray, GR, 1864

Synonyms
- Megapodius stairi

= Tongan megapode =

Species of bird

The Tongan megapode (Megapodius pritchardii) is a species of bird in the megapode family, Megapodiidae, currently endemic to Tonga. The species is also known as the Polynesian megapode, and as the Niuafo'ou megapode after the island of Niuafo'ou to which it was restricted for many years. The specific epithet honours British consul William Thomas Pritchard.

== Distribution and habitat ==
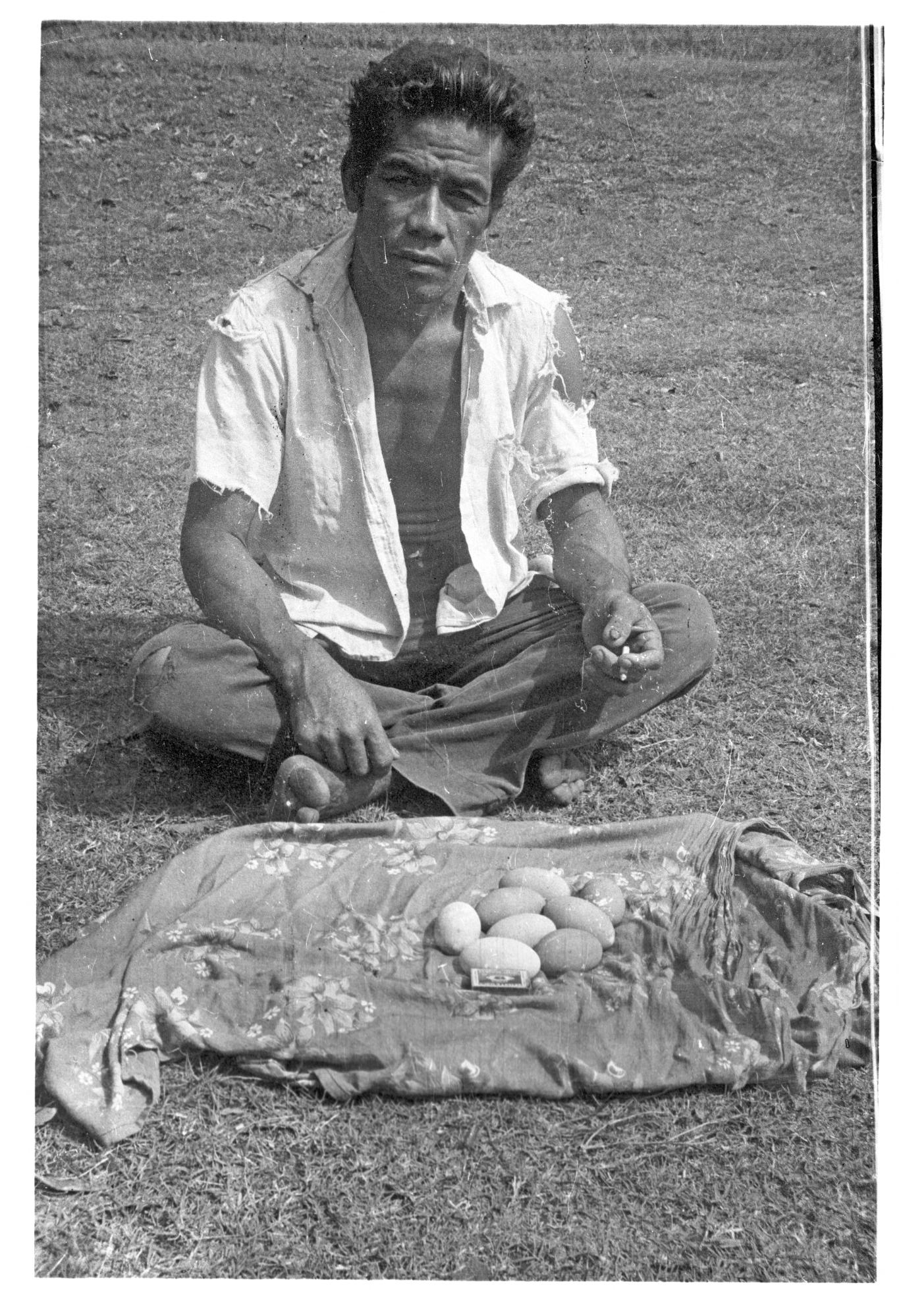
Eggs of the Malau (Megapodius pritchardii), gathered at Lake Vai Lahi (Niuafoʻou) in 1967.

The Tongan megapode is the only remaining species of megapode in Tonga out of the four or five species that were present on the islands in prehuman times (as shown through the fossil record), and indeed the only species of megapode that survives in Polynesia. Similar extinctions occurred in Fiji and New Caledonia, which apparently had three species in prehistory. The species itself once had a more widespread distribution, occurring across most of Tonga, Samoa, and Niue. The cause of all these extinctions and declines was the arrival of humans on the islands, and the associated predation on adults and particularly eggs, as well as predation by introduced species.

On Niuafo'ou the small human population and remoteness of its habitat probably saved the species. The only megapode to survive human arrival in Western Polynesia, "the megapode nesting grounds were carefully controlled by the ruling chief, thus assuring the continued survival of this population."

Its natural habitat is tropical moist lowland forests. On Niuafo'ou it is most common on the central caldera. The Tongan megapode, like all megapodes, does not incubate its eggs by sitting on them; instead the species buries them in warm volcanic sands and soil and allows them to develop. On islands in former parts of its range without volcanoes it presumably created mounds of rotting vegetation and laid the eggs there. The young birds are capable of flying immediately after hatching.

== Status and conservation ==
The Tongan megapode is principally threatened by the same factors that caused its decline in the rest of Polynesia. Its eggs are still harvested by local people in spite of theoretical government protection, and some hunting still occurs. The species is apparently afforded some protection by the difficulty in reaching its habitat. Because of the vulnerability of the single population an attempt was made to translocate eggs of this species to new islands, Late and Fonualei. The translocation was successful on Fonualei and an estimated 350–500 birds now breed there, but surveys of late subsequently found that the translocation there had failed.
