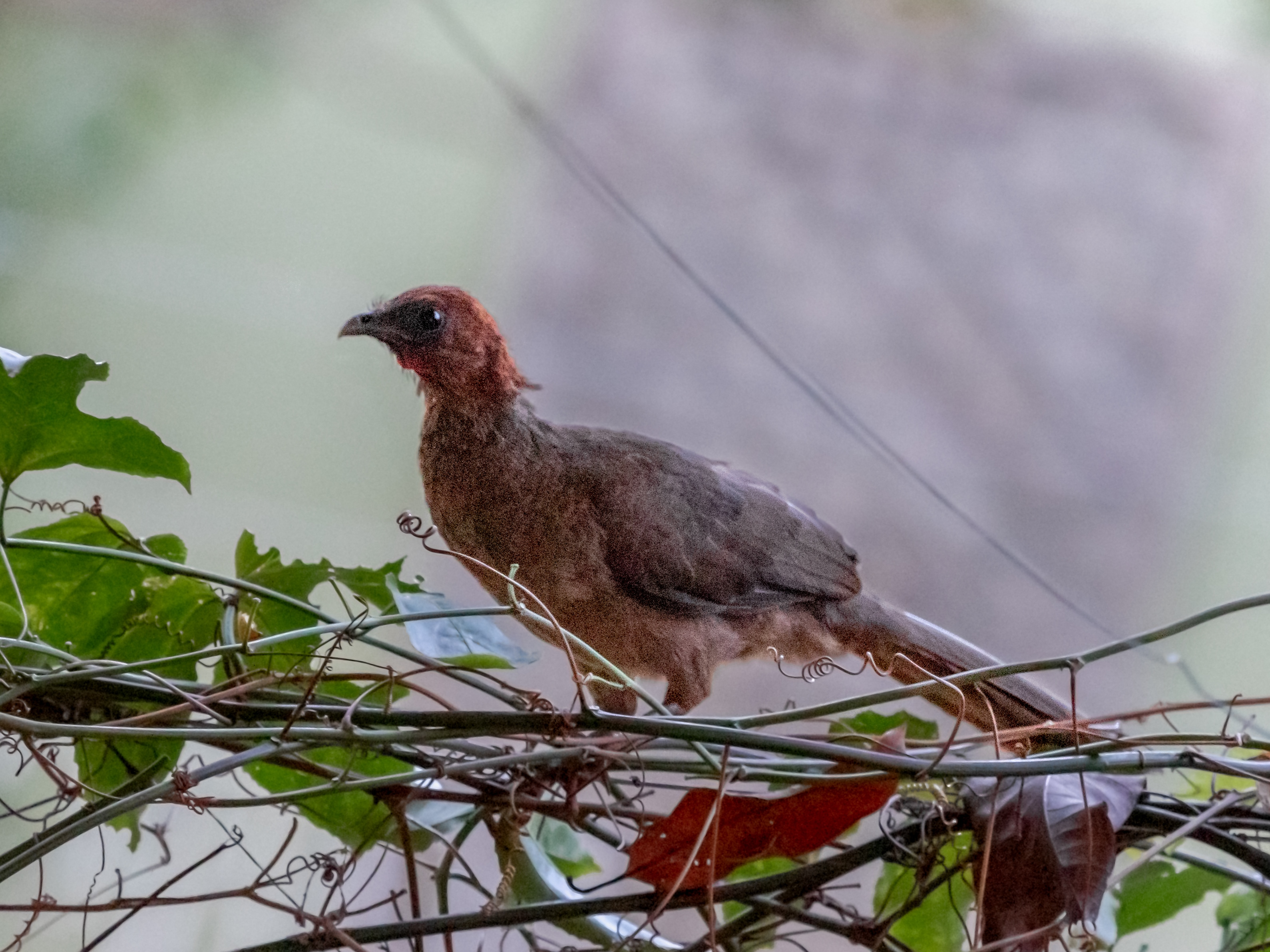

Scientific classification
- Kingdom: Animalia
- Phylum: Chordata
- Class: Aves
- Order: Galliformes
- Family: Cracidae
- Genus: Ortalis
- Species: O. ruficeps

Binomial name
- Ortalis ruficeps (Wagler, 1830)

Synonyms
- Ortalis motmot ruficeps

= Chestnut-headed chachalaca =

Species of bird

The chestnut-headed chachalaca (Ortalis ruficeps) is a bird in the family Cracidae, the chachalacas, guans, and curassows. It is endemic to Brazil.

== Taxonomy and systematics ==
What is now the chestnut-headed chachalaca was previously a subspecies of what was then called variable chachalaca (Ortalis motmot). (Confusingly, after the split the International Ornithological Committee (IOC) renamed O. motmot "little chachalaca" but the American Ornithological Society (AOS) and the Clements taxonomy retained the name "variable" for it.) It is monotypic.

== Description ==
The chestnut-headed chachalaca is 43 to 54 cm (1.4 to 1.8 ft) long and weighs 345 to 620 g (0.76 to 1.4 lb). It has a reddish-chestnut head, grayish brown upperparts, grayish underparts, and dark brown primary flight feathers.

== Distribution and habitat ==
The chestnut-headed chachalaca is found only in north-central Brazil, south of the Amazon River between rio Tapajós in Pará state and rio Araguaia in Tocantins state. Though its habitat has not been well studied, it is believed to be similar to that of the little chachalaca: landscapes such as dense secondary forest and the undergrowth along rivers, in clearings, and abandoned pastures. It probably avoids the interior of dense forest.

== Behavior ==
=== Feeding ===
The chestnut-headed chachalaca's feeding behavior and diet are assumed to be the same as those of little chachalaca. That species forages in trees or on the ground, usually in pairs or small flocks. Its primary diet is berries and fruits although it also eats flowers and leaves.

=== Breeding ===
No information has been published about the chestnut-headed chachalaca's breeding phenology.

=== Vocalization ===
The chestnut-headed chachalaca's song is "a loud, rollicking duet, a repeated 'WATCH-a-lak', which is mainly given at dawn and dusk" and is very similar to that of the little chachalaca though slower.

== Status ==
The IUCN has not assessed the chestnut-headed chachalaca. It is considered rather common in parts of its range and occurs in some protected areas.
