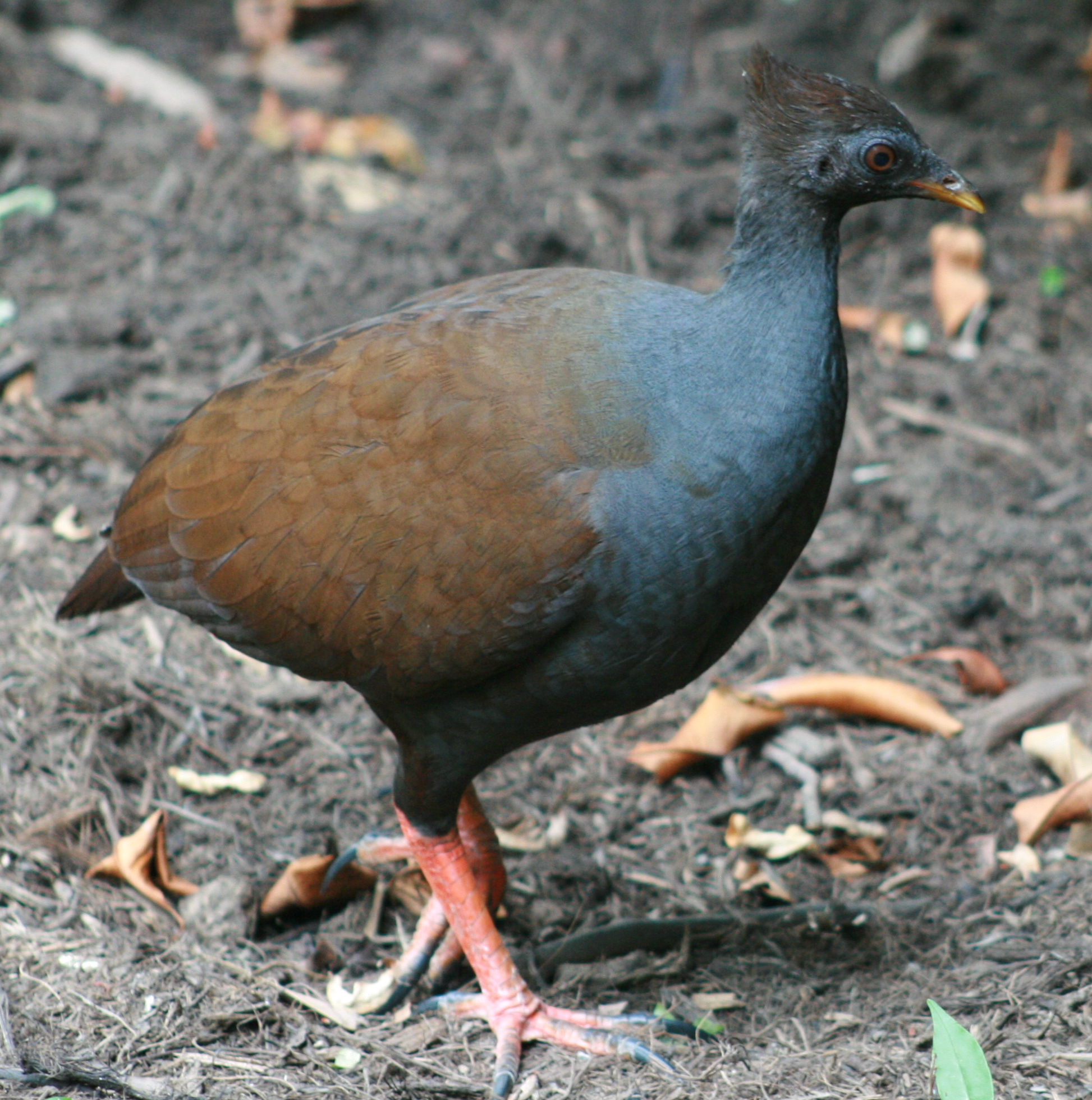

Conservation status
- Least Concern (IUCN 3.1)

Scientific classification
- Kingdom: Animalia
- Phylum: Chordata
- Class: Aves
- Order: Galliformes
- Family: Megapodiidae
- Genus: Megapodius
- Species: M. reinwardt

Binomial name
- Megapodius reinwardt Dumont, 1823

Subspecies
- M. r. buruensis (Stresemann, 1914); M. r. castanonotus (Mayr, 1938); M. r. reinwardt (Dumont, 1823); M. r. macgillivrayi (GR Gray, 1862); M. r. tumulus (Gould, 1842); M. r. yorki (Mathews, 1929)
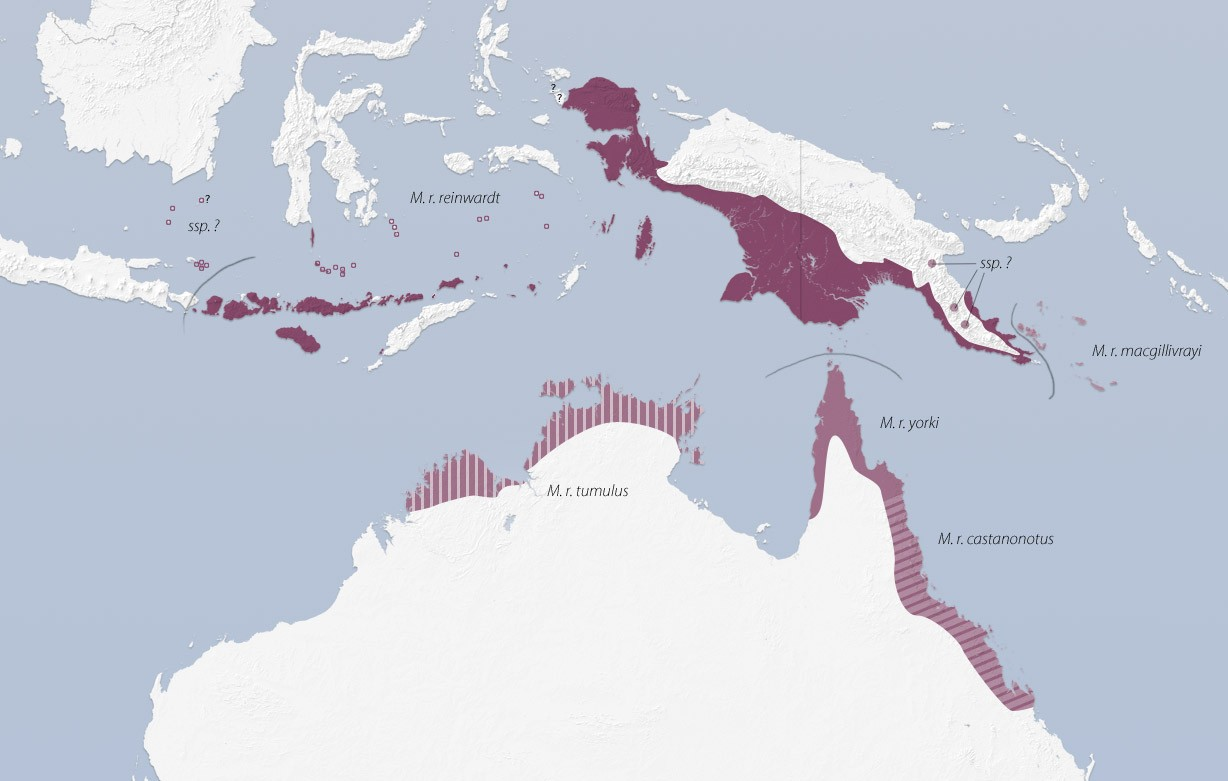

= Orange-footed scrubfowl =

Species of bird

The orange-footed scrubfowl (Megapodius reinwardt), also known as orange-footed megapode or just scrubfowl, is a small megapode of the family Megapodiidae native to many islands in the Lesser Sunda Islands as well as southern New Guinea and northern Australia.

== Description ==
It is a terrestrial bird the size of a domestic chicken and dark-coloured with strong orange legs and a pointed crest at the back of the head. It utilises a range of forest and scrub habitats and has colonised many small islands throughout its range. It is prolific in suburban Darwin gardens, where people refer to it as a bush chook, bush chicken, bush turkey, or most commonly, the bush boiby

== Conservation ==
In general, populations seem to be stable and the conservation status of the species is considered to be of Least Concern.

== Diet ==
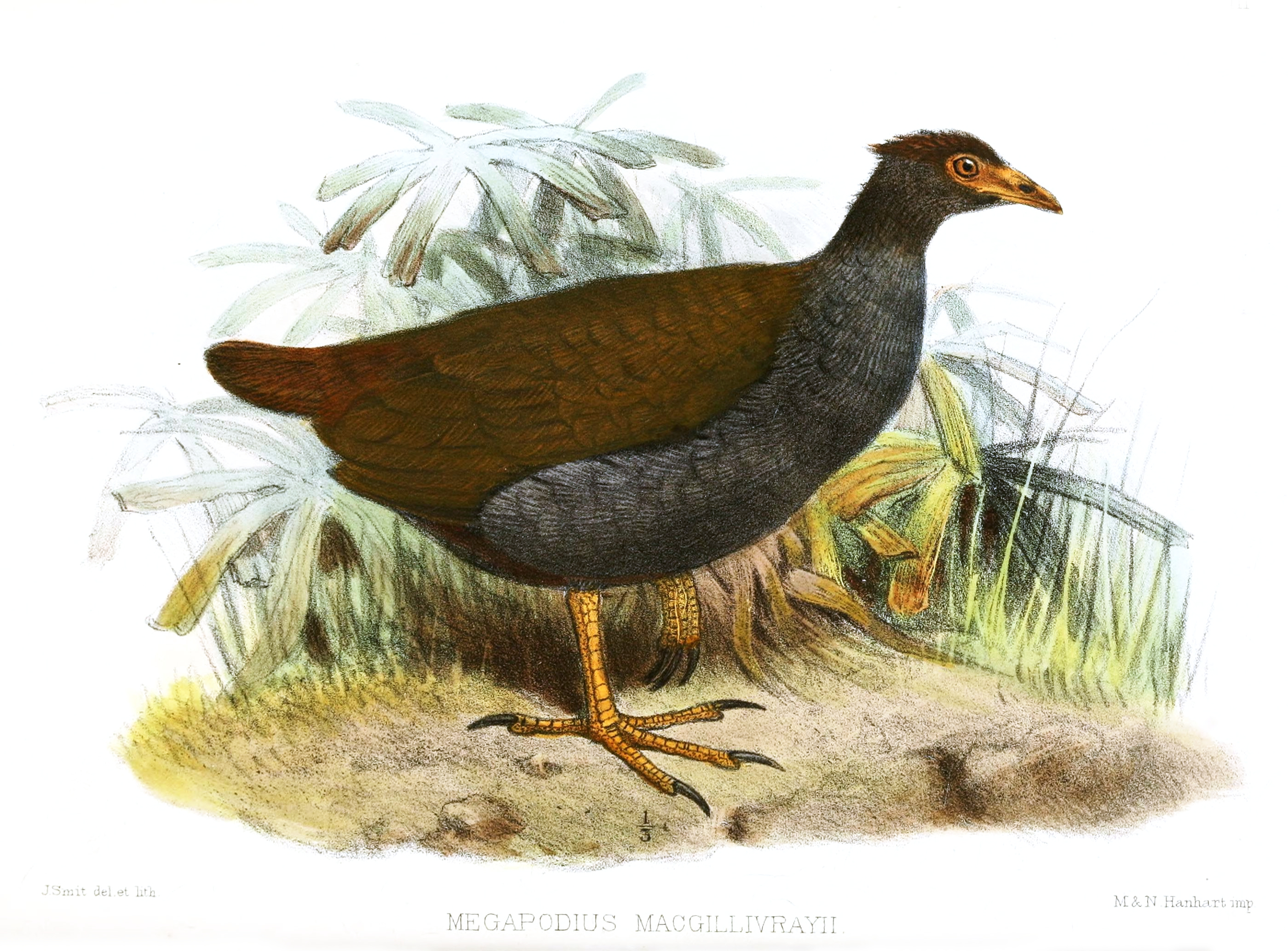
M. r. macgillivrayi

The orange-footed scrubfowl feeds on seeds, fallen fruit and terrestrial invertebrates.

== Breeding ==
As with other megapodes, it nests in large mounds of sand, leaf litter and other debris where the heat generated by the decomposition of organic material serves to incubate the eggs. Construction and maintenance of the mounds, which may reach 4.5 m (15 ft) in height and 9 m (30 ft) in diameter, takes place throughout the year.

== Taxonomy ==
There are 5 subspecies. Some of the subspecies may be treated as full species, such as the Tanimbar scrubfowl (Megapodius tenimberensis), while other subspecies may be considered subspecies of other species (e.g., M. r. buruensis is sometimes considered a subspecies of the dusky megapode).

== In Aboriginal language and culture ==
The Kunwinjku people of west Arnhem Land know this bird as kurrukurldanj. The people of Flores Islands in Indonesia named this bird as Wodon.
