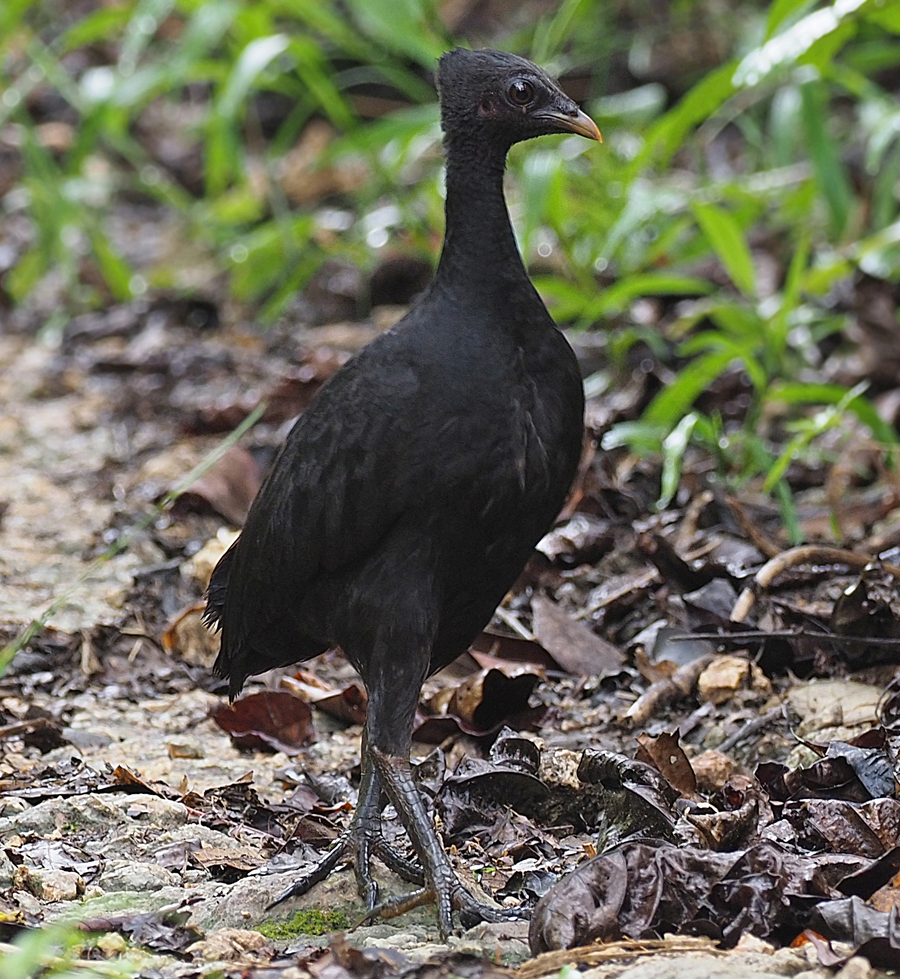

Conservation status
- Least Concern (IUCN 3.1)

Scientific classification
- Kingdom: Animalia
- Phylum: Chordata
- Class: Aves
- Order: Galliformes
- Family: Megapodiidae
- Genus: Megapodius
- Species: M. freycinet

Binomial name
- Megapodius freycinet Gaimard, 1823

Subspecies
- M. f. forsteni (GR Gray, 1847)(disputed); M. f. oustaleti (Roselaar, 1994) (disputed); M. f. quoyii (GR Gray, 1862)(disputed); M. f. freycinet (Gaimard, 1823)

= Dusky megapode =

Species of bird

The dusky megapode (Megapodius freycinet), also known as dusky scrubfowl or common megapode, is a medium-sized, approximately 41 cm (16 in) long, blackish bird with a short pointed crest, bare red facial skin, dark legs, brown irises, and a dark brown and yellow bill. The male and female are similar. This terrestrial species lives in forests and swamps, including mangroves, of the Maluku and Raja Ampat Islands in Indonesia. Like other megapodes, it lays its eggs in a mound made from earth mixed with leaves, sand, gravel, and sticks, which can be as large as 11 m (36 ft) in diameter and stand nearly 5 m (16 ft) tall.

Many authorities include the Biak scrubfowl as a subspecies of this species, but the two are increasingly treated as separate species. At the same time, many authorities consider the taxon M. forsteni a separate species, Forsten's megapode, but measurements and molecular evidence suggest the two are very close, and arguably better considered conspecific. Traditionally, most members of the genus Megapodius have been listed as subspecies of M. freycinet, but today, all major authorities consider this to be incorrect.

The specific name commemorates the French explorer Louis Claude Desaulses de Freycinet.

A fairly common species throughout a large part of its range, the dusky scrubfowl is evaluated as least concern on the IUCN Red List of Threatened Species.
