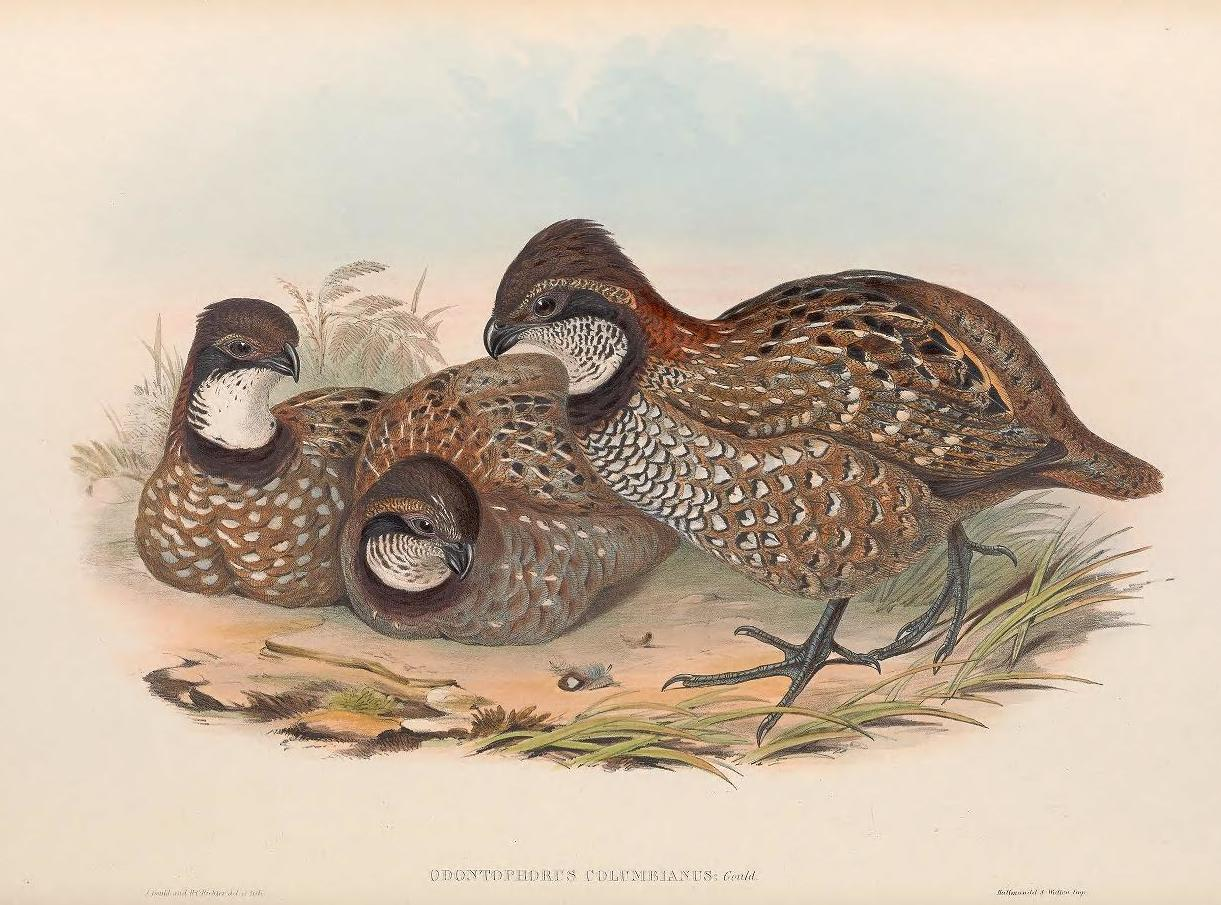
- Illustration by John Gould & H. C. Richter

Conservation status
- Near Threatened (IUCN 3.1)

Scientific classification
- Kingdom: Animalia
- Phylum: Chordata
- Class: Aves
- Order: Galliformes
- Family: Odontophoridae
- Genus: Odontophorus
- Species: O. columbianus

Binomial name
- Odontophorus columbianus Gould, 1850

= Venezuelan wood quail =

Species of bird

The Venezuelan wood quail (Odontophorus columbianus) is a bird species in the family Odontophoridae, the New World quail. It is found in the Venezuelan Coastal Range.

== Taxonomy and systematics ==
Some authors have suggested that the Venezuelan wood quail and gorgeted wood quail (Odontophorus strophium), Tacarcuna wood quail (O. dialeucos), black-fronted wood quail (O. atrifons), and black-breasted wood quail (O. lecuolaemus) are actually a single species, but this treatment has not been accepted by the major avian taxonomic systems. The species is monotypic.

== Description ==
The Venezuelan wood quail is 25 to 30 cm (9.8 to 11.8 in) long. Males are estimated to weigh 343 g (12.1 oz) and females 336 g (11.9 oz). Adult males have a white throat and chin with black streaks. The rest of the plumage is reddish brown with large white marks on the breast, belly, and flanks. The female has paler brown underparts with less conspicuous white marks, and the juvenile is similar to the female.

== Distribution and habitat ==
The Venezuelan wood quail is principally found in the central part of Venezuela's Coastal Range, from Carabobo east to northwestern Miranda. There are also two sight records from Táchira in the west near the Colombian border. It inhabits the floor of subtropical cloudforest at elevations between 800 and 2,400 m (2,600 and 7,900 ft).

== Behavior ==
=== Feeding ===
The Venezuelan wood quail forages by scratching litter and bare soil to feed on seeds, fruits, insects, worms, and roots.

=== Breeding ===
The Venezuelan wood quail's breeding season begins in March and is thought to extend to the end of July. One nest has been found; it was at the base of palms, had a roof of vegetation, and contained six eggs.

=== Vocalization ===
The Venezuelan wood quail's advertising call is "a rapidly repeated antiphonal duet" rendered as "churdole-chur-it, churdole-chur-it...".

== Status ==
The IUCN has assessed the Venezuelan wood quail as Near Threatened "because it has a small extent of occurrence within which it is presumed to be declining owing to habitat loss and hunting pressure".
