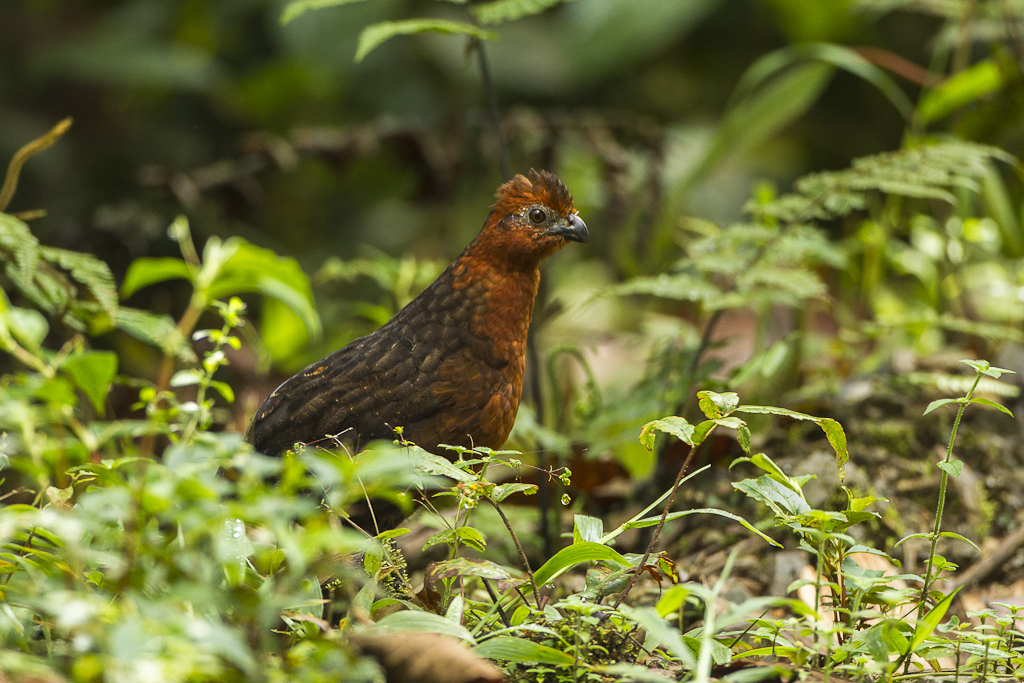

Conservation status
- Least Concern (IUCN 3.1)

Scientific classification
- Kingdom: Animalia
- Phylum: Chordata
- Class: Aves
- Order: Galliformes
- Family: Odontophoridae
- Genus: Odontophorus
- Species: O. hyperythrus

Binomial name
- Odontophorus hyperythrus Gould, 1858

= Chestnut wood quail =

Species of bird

The chestnut wood quail (Odontophorus hyperythrus) is a bird species in the family Odontophoridae, the New World quail. It is found only in Colombia.

== Taxonomy and systematics ==
The chestnut wood quail has at various times been proposed or considered as conspecific with rufous-fronted wood quail (Odonophorus erythrops), dark-backed wood quail (O. melanonotus), and rufous-breasted wood quail (O. speciosus). It is monotypic.

== Description ==
The chestnut wood quail is 25 to 29 cm (9.8 to 11.4 in) long. Males weigh 325 to 380 g (11.5 to 13.4 oz) and females 325 to 330 g (11.5 to 11.6 oz). Both sexes have grayish white feathers around the eye, with the female's more extensive. Adult males have a chestnut head and brown back, rump, and wings. The rump has fine black vermiculation. The throat and undersides are rufous. The adult female's crown is dusky brown and its breast and belly are dark gray. The juvenile is similar to the adult female.

== Distribution and habitat ==
The chestnut wood quail is found mostly in the western and central Andes of Colombia and locally in the eastern Andes. In elevation it ranges from 1,600 to 2,800 m (5,200 to 9,200 ft). It inhabits the interior and edges of subtropical montane forest, both primary and secondary. It is primarily terrestrial but has been seen roosting as high as 10 m (33 ft) above ground.

== Behavior ==
=== Feeding ===
The chestnut wood quail forages by scratching in leaf litter for roots, seeds, fallen berries, and probably also insects.

=== Breeding ===
The chesnut wood quail appears to have two nesting seasons that correspond to the wettest part of the year, March to May and October to December. Nests are domed globes on the ground made of leaves and twigs with a short tunnel entrance. The clutch size is four or five and the female alone incubates the eggs. Family groups stay together for many months after hatching.

=== Vocalization ===
The chestnut wood quail's advertising call is "a rollicking, rapidly repeated duet, 'orrit-kilyit...'". It also has an alarm call, "a low 'peetit, peetit...'".

== Status ==
The IUCN has assessed the chestnut wood quail as being of Least Concern. Until 2020 it had been rated Near Threatened. Though its population size is not known and is thought to be declining, those criteria are not critical enough to warrant a more perilous rating.
