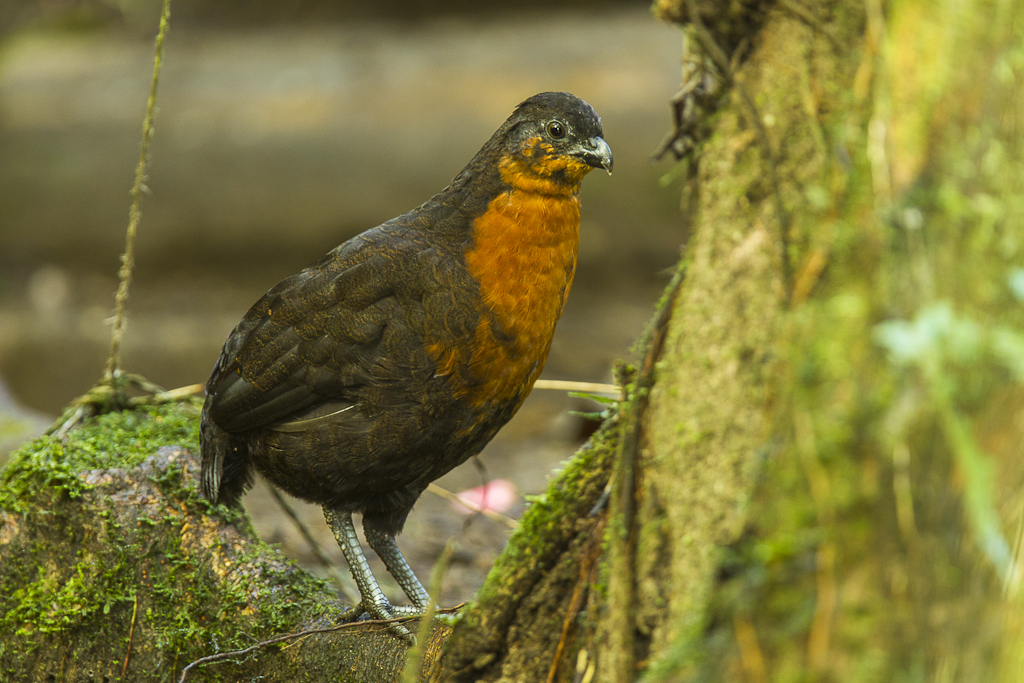
- In Mindo, Ecuador

Conservation status
- Least Concern (IUCN 3.1)

Scientific classification
- Kingdom: Animalia
- Phylum: Chordata
- Class: Aves
- Order: Galliformes
- Family: Odontophoridae
- Genus: Odontophorus
- Species: O. melanonotus

Binomial name
- Odontophorus melanonotus Gould, 1861

= Dark-backed wood quail =

Species of bird

The dark-backed wood quail (Odontophorus melanonotus) is a bird species in the family Odontophoridae, which is the New World quail. It is found in Colombia and Ecuador.

== Taxonomy and systematics ==
The dark-backed wood quail is one of 15 species in the genus Odontophorus. Within the genus, it is part of the chestnut wood quail species complex. At various times it has been proposed or considered as conspecific with chestnut wood quail (O. hyperythrus), rufous-fronted wood quail (O. erythrops), and rufous-breasted wood quail (O. speciosus).

The generic name Odontophorus is from the Greek odontophoros, meaning tooth-bearing. The specific epithet melanonotus is from the Greek melas, meaning black, and notus, meaning backed.

The species is monotypic.

== Description ==
The dark-backed wood quail is 23 to 28 cm (9.1 to 11.0 in) long. Both males and females weigh about 322 g (11.4 oz). Adults of both sexes are overall brownish black with fine chestnut vermiculation. The throat and breast are reddish chestnut. The juvenile is similarly colored but duller overall.

== Distribution and habitat ==
The dark-backed wood quail is found in the Andes from southern Colombia's Nariño Department south to Cotopaxi Province in Ecuador. It inhabits primary and secondary tropical forest in the fairly narrow altitudinal band between 1,100 and 2,200 m (3,600 and 7,200 ft). Though primarily terrestrial, it roosts above ground in trees.

== Behavior ==
=== Feeding ===
The dark-backed wood quail forages in groups of up to 10 birds seeking terrestrial invertebrates and fruit.

=== Breeding ===
Almost nothing is known about the dark-backed wood quail's breeding phenology. Observations of recently hatched chicks and dependent young in many different months indicate a long breeding season or possibly two of them.

=== Vocalization ===
The dark-backed, wood quail's advertising song is a duet, "a fast rollicking 'koreewow-koreewow-koreewow...'" and calls include "soft whistles and mellow rolling notes."

== Status ==
The IUCN has assessed the dark-backed wood quail as Least-Concern. The population trend has not been quantified. Tree cover loss within the range is very low. Apart from mature forests, the species is also found in secondary growth, tangled shrubby undergrowth, and open-canopy forest; consequently, the current rate of tree cover loss may not be affecting the population. The species may, however, be subject to hunting; even though its impact on the population size has not been quantified, it is here precautionarily suspected that hunting is driving a slow population decline, not exceeding 10% over three generations (14.1 years).
