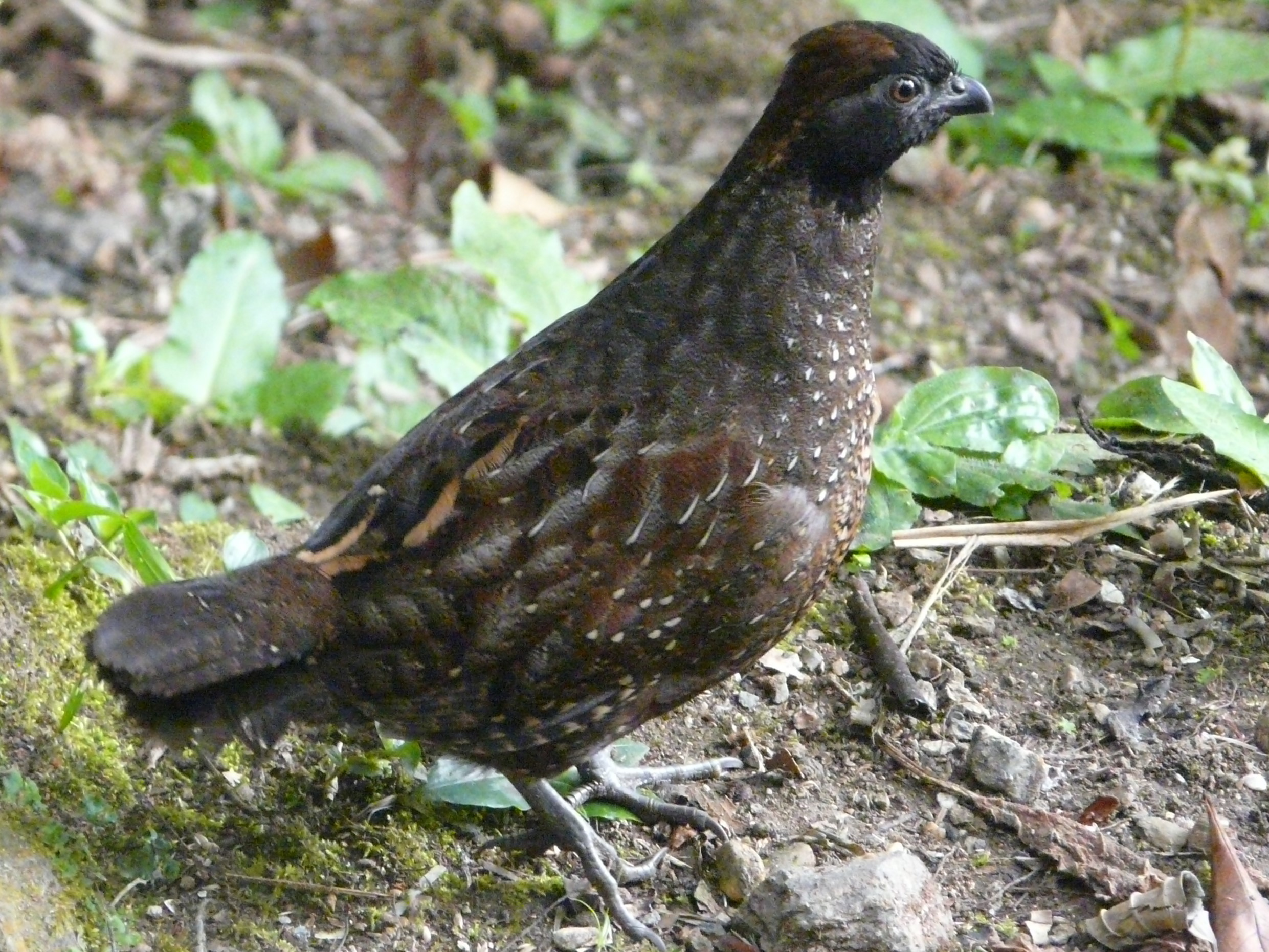

Conservation status
- Least Concern (IUCN 3.1)

Scientific classification
- Kingdom: Animalia
- Phylum: Chordata
- Class: Aves
- Order: Galliformes
- Family: Odontophoridae
- Genus: Odontophorus
- Species: O. atrifrons

Binomial name
- Odontophorus atrifrons Allen, 1900

= Black-fronted wood quail =

Species of bird

The black-fronted wood quail (Odontophorus atrifrons) is a bird species in the family Odontophoridae, the New World quail. It is found in Colombia and Venezuela.

== Taxonomy and systematics ==
Some authors have suggested that the black-fronted wood quail and gorgeted wood quail (Odontophorus strophium), Tacarcuna wood quail (O. dialeucos), Venezuelan wood quail (O. columbianus), and black-breasted wood quail (O. lecuolaemus) are actually a single species, but this treatment has not been accepted by the major avian taxonomic systems.

The black-fronted wood quail has three subspecies, the nominate O. a. atrifrons, O. a. variegatus, and O. a. navai.

== Description ==
The black-fronted wood quail is 24 to 30 cm (9.4 to 11.8 in) long. Males are estimated to weigh 311 g (11.0 oz) and females 298 g (10.5 oz). Both sexes have a distinctive black forehead ("front"), face, and throat. Adult males of the nominate subspecies have a reddish brown crown, a gray back with black vermiculation, and a browner rump. The closed wing shows small white spots. Its breast is blackish brown. The adult female is similar but has more reddish underparts. The juvenile is similar to the female. O. a. variegatus has a larger area of black on the crown than the nominate, its back is browner with a more intricate pattern, and its wings and belly have cinnamon tones. O. a. navai also has a larger area of black on the crown and its body is drab dark brown with no reddish tones.

== Distribution and habitat ==
The nominate subspecies of black-fronted wood quail is found in the Sierra Nevada de Santa Marta of northeastern Colombia. O. a. variegatus is found at the northern end of Colombia's eastern Andes. O. a. navai is found in Serranía del Perijá, which straddles the Colombia-Venezuela border. The species inhabits the floor of tropical and subtropical montane forest, usually at elevations between 1,200 and 3,100 m (3,900 and 10,200 ft) but as low as 700 m (2,300 ft) in the Sierra Nevada de Santa Marta.

== Behavior ==
=== Feeding ===
The black-fronted wood quail forages in coveys of up to 10 birds, scratching in leaf litter for insects and berries.

=== Breeding ===
The black-fronted wood quail's breeding season appears to span at least from May to August. One nest has been found; it was a bed of dried leaves and small sticks in a hollow in the ground and contained three eggs.

=== Vocalization ===
The black-fronted wood quail's advertising call is a "rhythmic, whistled, series" described as "bob-a-white". It also has a rattling call and "gabbling calls" among covey mates.

== Status ==
The IUCN originally assessed the black-fronted wood quail as Near Threatened in 1988. In 2000 it updated the assessment to Vulnerable "owing to its small range and population, both of which must be declining in response to habitat loss. The range is small and fragmented with recent records from only one area [as of 2016]." As of 2023 its status has been reassessed as Least Concern.
