= Tacarcuna wood quail =

Conservation status
- Least Concern (IUCN 3.1)

Scientific classification
- Kingdom: Animalia
- Phylum: Chordata
- Class: Aves
- Order: Galliformes
- Family: Odontophoridae
- Genus: Odontophorus
- Species: O. dialeucos

Binomial name
- Odontophorus dialeucos Wetmore, 1963

Species of bird

The Tacarcuna wood quail (Odontophorus dialeucos) is a species of bird in the family Odontophoridae, the New World quail. It is found in Colombia and Panama.

== Taxonomy and systematics ==
Some authors have suggested that the Tarcarcuna wood quail and gorgeted wood quail (Odontophorus strophium), Venezuelan wood quail (O. columbianus), black-fronted wood quail (O. atrifons), and black-breasted wood quail (O. lecuolaemus) are actually a single species, but this treatment has not been accepted by the major avian taxonomic systems. The species is monotypic.

== Description ==
The Tacarcuna wood quail is 22 to 28 cm (8.7 to 11.0 in) long. Males are estimated to weigh 264 g (9.3 oz) and females 258 g (9.1 oz). Males' crown and throat are black and the supercilium, lores, and chin are white. The sides and back of the neck are cinnamon. The back and rump are olive brown with black vermiculation and the breast and belly are chestnut speckled with white. Females are similar but their underparts are more tawny brown. Juveniles are similar to the female but the white of the chin is smaller and the black of the throat broader.

== Distribution and habitat ==
The Tacarcuna wood quail is found along the Tacarcuna Ridge in Panama's Darién Province and Colombia's Chocó Department. It inhabits the floor of the subtropical forest at elevations between 1,050 and 1,450 m (3,440 and 4,760 ft).

== Behavior ==
=== Feeding ===
No information about the Tacarcuna wood quail's foraging behavior or diet has been published.

=== Breeding ===
A juvenile Tacarcuna wood quail was collected in early June but no other information about the species' breeding phenology has been published.

=== Vocalization ===
The Tacarcuna wood quail's vocalizations are poorly known.

== Status ==
The IUCN originally assessed the Tacarcuna wood quail as Near Threatened, and as Vulnerable between 2000–2021. Currently, it is assessed as Least Concern because, while it has a small population and range – 490 square kilometres (190 sq mi) – the population appears to be stable.
