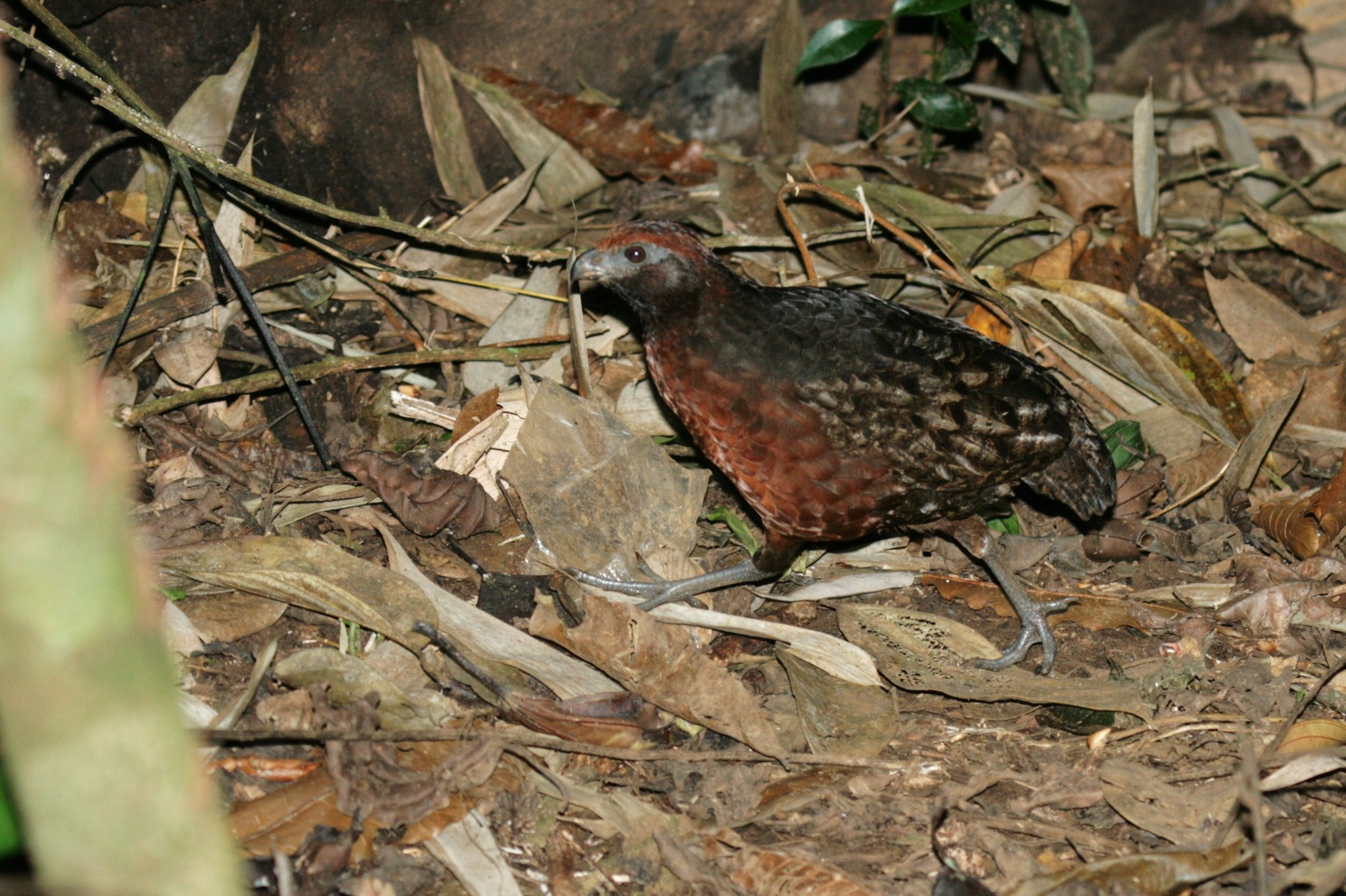

Conservation status
- Near Threatened (IUCN 3.1)

Scientific classification
- Kingdom: Animalia
- Phylum: Chordata
- Class: Aves
- Order: Galliformes
- Family: Odontophoridae
- Genus: Odontophorus
- Species: O. melanotis

Binomial name
- Odontophorus melanotis Salvin, 1865

= Black-eared wood quail =

Species of bird

The black-eared wood quail (Odontophorus melanotis) is a bird species in the order Galliformes. Until recently, the species was thought to be part of the family Phasianidae (Old World quail) however DNA-DNA hybridization results determined that black-eared wood quail are only distantly related to Old World quail. As a result, black-eared wood quail have been placed in the family Odontophoridae (New World quail) and more specifically, in the category of wood quail (genus Odontophorus).

There is limited information available on this species, but black-eared wood quail are considered to be forest-adapted, monogamous, relatively large pheasant-like birds that can be found in tropical and subtropical forests of Central America. They feed on insects and fruit and can be solo or in small groups.

== Description ==
The black-eared wood quail (Odontophorus melanotis) is a gallinaceous bird found in Central America. Its body is dark brown or black with a rufous breast. The most characteristic features of this bird are its unspotted chestnut crown and crest and its black face and throat. It has a black bill, blue-black legs and a purple bare ring around its eye. Females are close in appearance to males, but have a blue-black eye ring instead of purple, darker sides of the head and duller chestnut colors.

The black-eared wood quail is very similar in appearance to the Rufous-fronted wood quail (Odontophorus erythrops), but the Rufous-fronted wood quail has a distinctive white jugular band that is absent in the black-eared wood quail.

== Taxonomy ==
Black-eared wood quails are part of the taxonomic group Odontophorus. In the family Odontophoridae and subfamily Odontophorinae, Odontophorus is the largest genus with the greatest number of species and the largest collective geographic range. The species comprising this genus are typically large, forest dwelling birds. They are poorly observed, understudied and the least known group of all American gallinaceous birds.

Black-eared wood quails have often been considered to be a race of Rufous-fronted wood quail but there is no apparent evidence of intergradation. The current and most accurate nomenclature for the black-eared wood quail is Odontophorus melanotis and for the Rufous-fronted wood quail; Odontophorus erythrops.

There are two known subspecies of black-eared wood quail;

- Odontophorus melanotis verecundus (Peters, 1929) . This subspecies' range encompasses the Caribbean slope of Honduras.
- Odontophorus melanotis melanotis (Salvin, 1865). This subspecies has a distribution that includes South-East Honduras, Nicaragua as well as the Caribbean coast of Costa Rica and Panama.

== Habitat and distribution ==
Despite the insufficient amount of data available, most species of Odontophorus, including the black-eared wood quail, are considered to be forest-adapted and typically found in tropical and lower subtropical forest habitats. They are territorial, ground dwelling and often found on the forest floor of virgin forests or in the vegetation of thick second growth.

The black-eared wood quail persists across the Caribbean slope of central America; including Honduras, Nicaragua and Costa Rica, as well as eastern Panama and likely the northwest of Columbia.

== Behavior ==
The black-eared wood quail is presumed to be sedentary and is not known to migrate. Individuals of this species can be found alone, in pairs or in small groups of up to 10 or 12 individuals called coveys.

=== Vocalizations ===
Duetting is considered to be widespread within New World wood quail. Black-eared wood quail make soft, cooing or peeping conversational sounds among members of their covey. They also have an advertising call, which is a repetitive, ringing duet that can be sung by a lone bird and carries across long distances. The sound is described as "kooLAWlik kooLAWlik kooLAWK kooLAWK" or "LAWcooKLAWcoo".

=== Diet ===
Very little information is available on the specific diet and feeding strategies of black-eared wood quail. However, black-eared wood quail, like other New World wood quail, are surmised to scratch in leaf-litter for insects and fallen fruit.

=== Reproduction ===
The breeding season for black-eared wood quail is suspected to begin during the dry season of Panama (December to mid-April) and the birds are most likely monogamous. Nest have been found between trees, lined with leaves and grasses. Eggs have been found in clutches of 4 and were cream or white colored with brown spots. No additional information is available on the breeding and reproductive strategies of this species.

== Conservation status and Threats ==
There is insufficient information available for many species of wood quail which has resulted in inaccurate conservation assessments based on unreliable data. Deforestation is the major threat to the species as well as hunting. The black-eared wood quail's population is decreasing and the total population is thought to be less than 50,000 birds. Nonetheless, black-eared wood quail are not considered to be globally threatened and are near threatened on the IUCN Red List, although more extensive studies and surveys are highly recommended and required for more accurate conservation conclusions.
