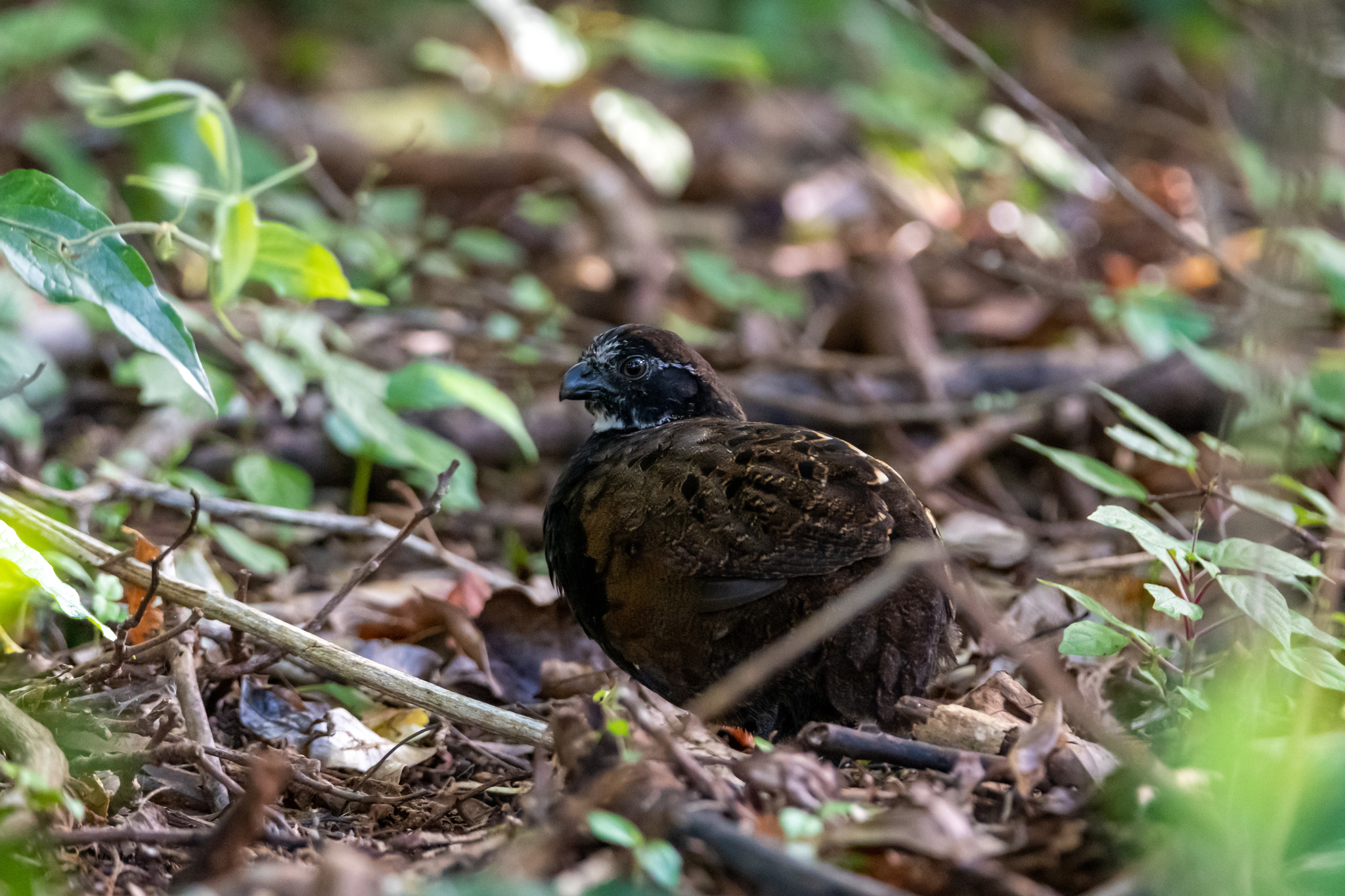

Conservation status
- Least Concern (IUCN 3.1)

Scientific classification
- Kingdom: Animalia
- Phylum: Chordata
- Class: Aves
- Order: Galliformes
- Family: Odontophoridae
- Genus: Odontophorus
- Species: O. leucolaemus

Binomial name
- Odontophorus leucolaemus Salvin, 1867

= Black-breasted wood quail =

Species of bird

The black-breasted wood quail (Odontophorus leucolaemus) is a bird species in the family Odontophoridae. It is found in Costa Rica and Panama. Its natural habitat is subtropical or tropical moist montane forest.

== Taxonomy ==
The black-breasted wood quail is one of 15 species in the genus Odontophorus. Within the genus, it is a part of the dusky wood quail species complex, and is sometimes considered to be conspecific with the Venezuelan wood quail, gorgeted wood quail, Tacarcuna wood quail, and the black-fronted wood quail.

The generic name Odontophorus is from the Greek odontophoros, meaning tooth-bearing. The specific epithet leucolaemus is from the Greek leukos, meaning white, and laimos, meaning throat. Alternative names for the species include white-throated wood quail.

The species is monotypic. Populations around Dota in Costa Rica have sometimes been split as a distinct subspecies, O. l. smithianus on the basis of differences in plumage, but they are generally considered a melanistic morph.

== Description ==
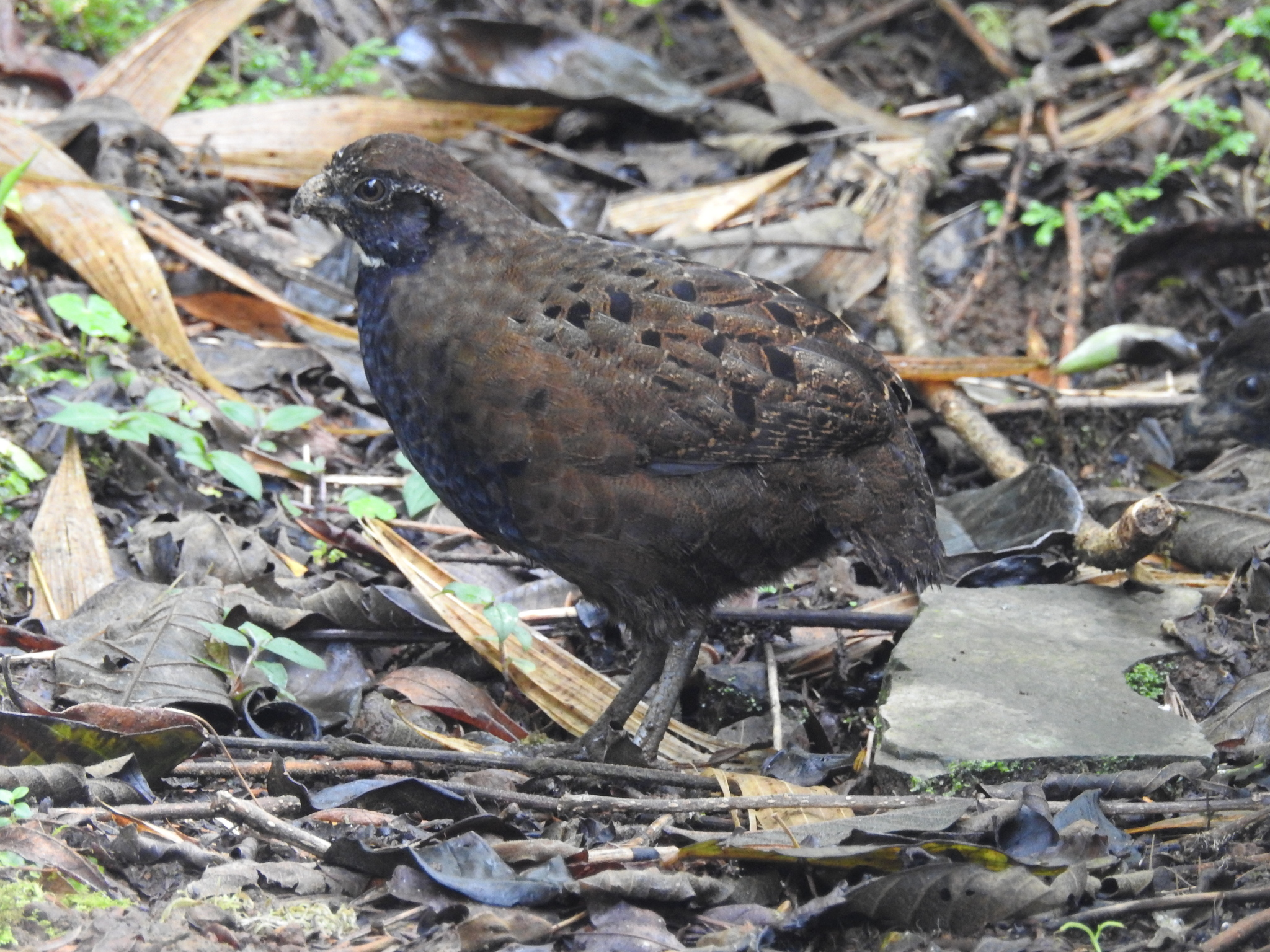
In Costa Rica

The black-breasted wood quail is a medium-sized species of New World quail, being 22–25.5 cm (8.7–10.0 in) in length and weighing on average 286 g (10.1 oz) for females and 300 g (11 oz) for males. Although males are larger than females, the sexes are otherwise similar and can not visually be distinguished.

== Distribution and habitat ==
The black-breasted wood quail is found in Costa Rica and Panama. However, it has not been recorded from Panama since 1933, and may be extirpated from there.

== Behaviour and ecology ==
Like other Odontophorus species, the black-breasted wood quail is gregarious year-round and usually travels in coveys of 10–15 individuals in undergrowth on forested slopes. These feed together over small areas throughout the day, and come together at dusk to roost in low branches. They also defend group territories together by calling back and forth with neighboring coveys, most often just after dawn, and displaying aggressively at the boundaries of their territories. Unlike other species in the genus, they do not vocalize at dusk. The species is shy and walks away in the undergrowth when approached, only flushing reluctantly.

Little is known about its diet. However, it may feed on plant matter, supplementing its diet with insects.

The black-breasted wood quail's breeding habits are poorly known, but the species is most likely monogamous. Cooperative breeding has also been recorded in the species. Nesting occurs at the start of the rainy season in May and June, but vocal activity is most intense from March-April. Nests are round hollows in leaf litter, with their entrances pointing slightly downwards, and are guarded by parties of adults. Eggs are laid in clutches of 4–6 eggs, and are white in color, eventually staining brown. Incubation takes 16–17 days.
