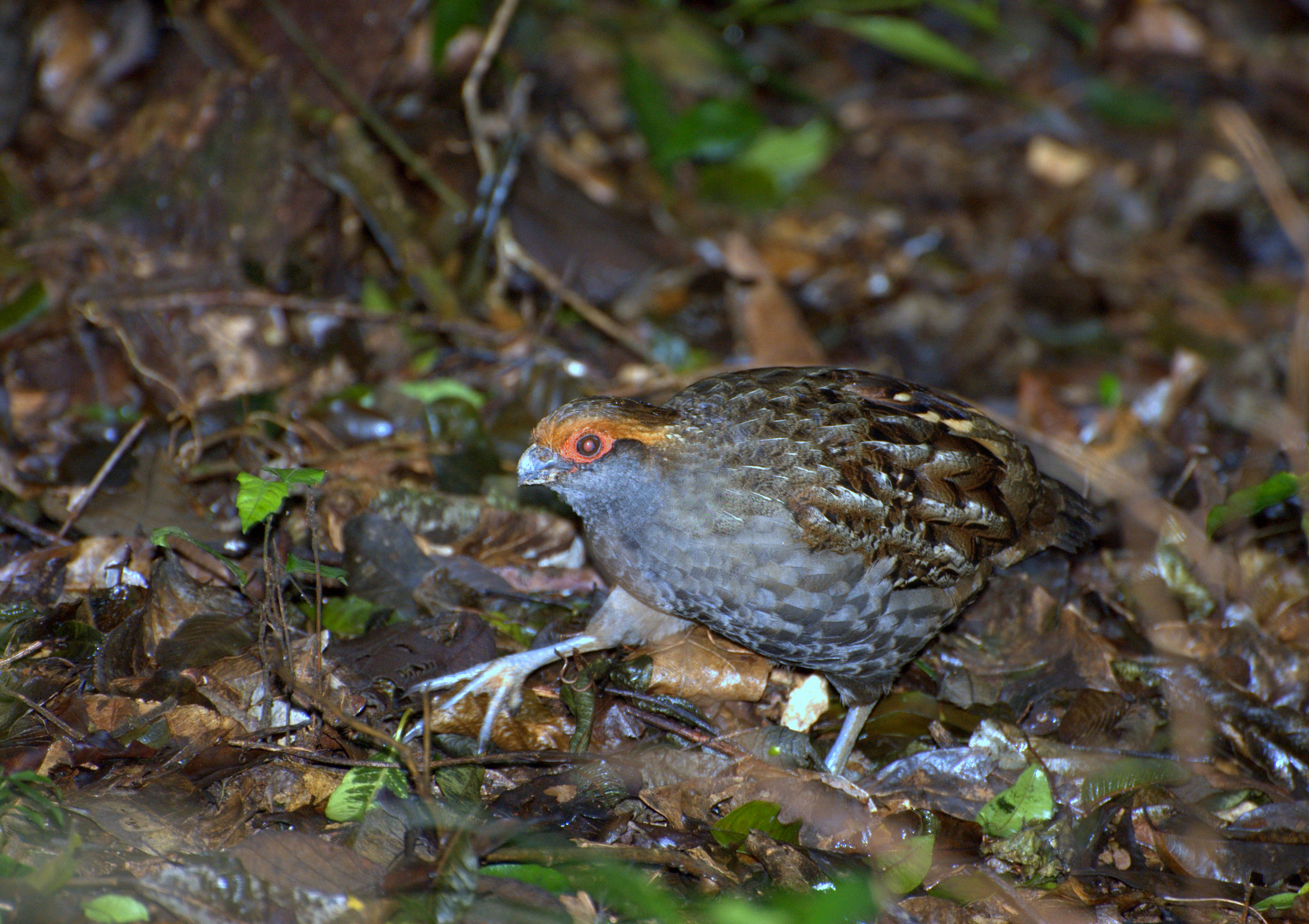

Conservation status
- Least Concern (IUCN 3.1)

Scientific classification
- Kingdom: Animalia
- Phylum: Chordata
- Class: Aves
- Order: Galliformes
- Family: Odontophoridae
- Genus: Odontophorus
- Species: O. capueira

Binomial name
- Odontophorus capueira (Spix, 1825)

= Spot-winged wood quail =

Species of bird

The spot-winged wood quail (Odontophorus capueira) is a species of bird in the family Odontophoridae. It is found in Brazil, Argentina and Paraguay, and formerly in Uruguay. In Portuguese and Spanish the bird is called uru (Corcovado Urú).

Its natural habitats are subtropical or tropical dry lowland forests. Its population is thought to be declining but at a moderate rate, so the International Union for Conservation of Nature has assessed it as being a "least-concern species".

== Description ==
Male and female spot-winged wood quails are similar in appearance but the female is slightly smaller. The bird has a reddish-brown crown with a loose crest, speckled with buff. The supercilium (stripe above the eye) and the chest-band are reddish-cinnamon. The upper parts are greyish-brown, with dark vermiculations and speckling, with the individual feathers on neck, mantle, back and scapulars having white streaks beside the shaft. The sides of the head, throat and underparts are slatey-grey. The legs are dark grey, the bill is blackish, the iris brown and the bare area around the eyes red. The length range is about 26 to 30 cm (10 to 12 in). Juveniles are similar in colouring but have reddish bills, more speckled upper parts and grey underparts flushed with rust and speckled with white.

== Distribution ==
The spot-winged wood quail is native to eastern and southeastern Brazil, the extreme northeastern part of Argentina and the eastern part of Paraguay. It inhabits dry lowland forest, including secondary forest, at altitudes not exceeding 1,600 m (5,200 ft).

== Ecology ==
Spot-winged wood quails tend to move around on the ground by day in small groups of typically six to eight, but sometimes up to fifteen. When disturbed they move off into the undergrowth and seldom take to the wing, especially when the group includes chicks. The birds sometimes freeze and crouch. The diet includes fallen nuts of Araucaria and other trees, the berries of pokeweed and other plants and probably invertebrates. At night these birds roost well off the ground in trees. They are monogamous and breeding takes place between August and November. The nest is built on the ground with a side entrance and a roof of dead leaves. About four white eggs are laid which soon become discoloured. The female incubates the clutch, which hatch after about eighteen days, and she also rears the chicks without help.

== Status ==
The spot-winged wood quail has a very extensive distribution and is common in at least part of its range, although the most northerly populations are at risk from hunting. The total population is thought to be declining but not at such a rate as to put the bird at risk, and the International Union for Conservation of Nature has assessed its conservation status as being of "least concern".
