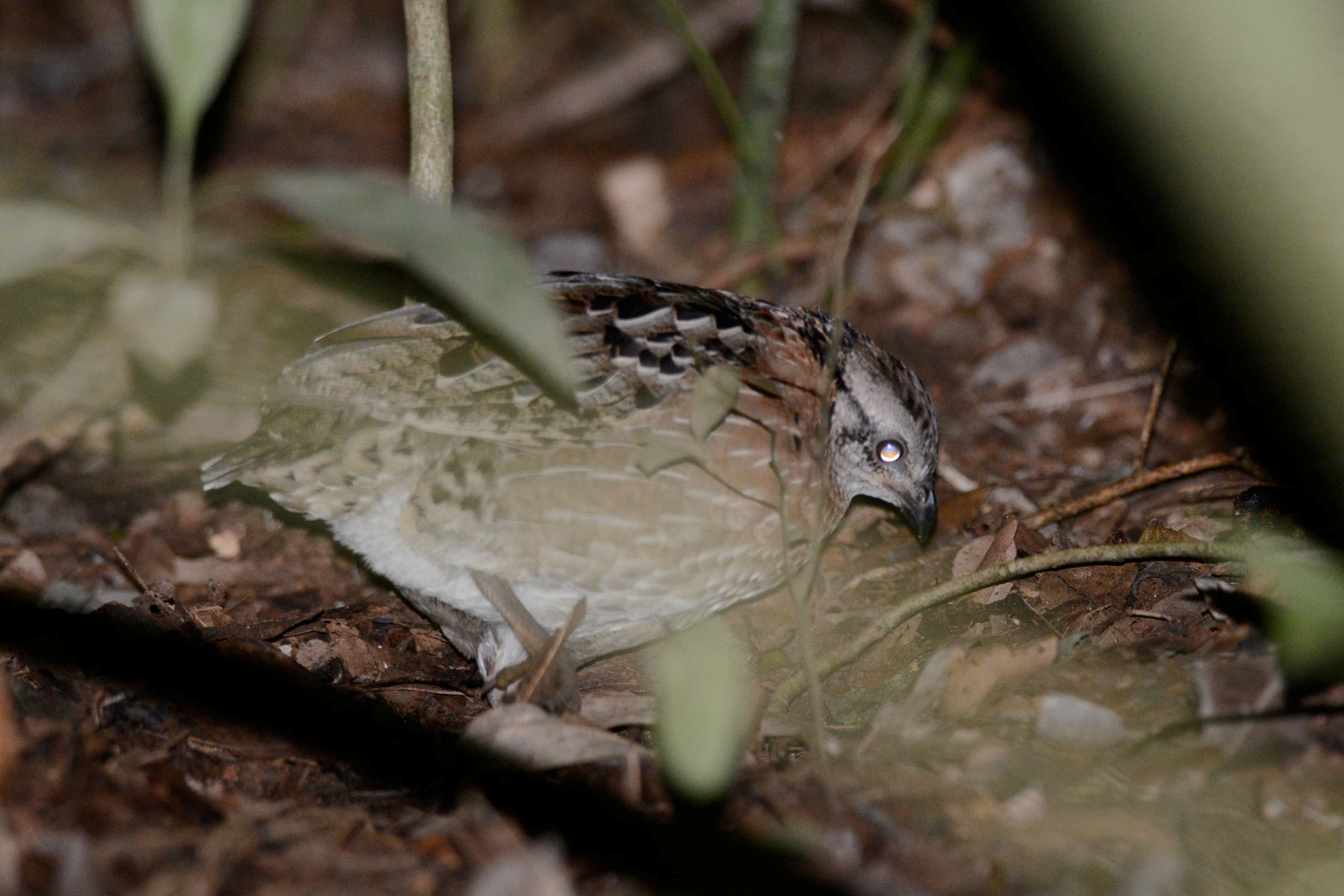

Conservation status
- Least Concern (IUCN 3.1)

Scientific classification
- Domain: Eukaryota
- Kingdom: Animalia
- Phylum: Chordata
- Class: Aves
- Order: Galliformes
- Family: Odontophoridae
- Genus: Dactylortyx; Ogilvie-Grant, 1893
- Species: D. thoracicus

Binomial name
- Dactylortyx thoracicus (Gambel, 1848)

= Singing quail =

Species of bird

The singing quail (Dactylortyx thoracicus) is a species of bird in the family Odontophoridae, the New World quail. It is found in Belize, El Salvador, Guatemala, Honduras, and Mexico.

== Taxonomy and systematics ==
The singing quail is the only member of its genus and has 11 subspecies. Several other subspecies have been proposed but have not been validated; those forms are included within the 11 accepted subspecies.

- D. t. pettingilli Warner & Harrell 1957
- D. t. thoracicus (Gambel 1848) (Veracruz singing quail)
- D. t. sharpei Nelson 1903 (Yucatán singing quail)
- D. t. paynteri Warner & Harrell 1955
- D. t. devius Nelson 1898 (Jaliscan singing quail)
- D. t. melodus Warner & Harrell 1957
- D. t. chiapensis Nelson 1898 (Chiapan singing quail)
- D. t. dolichonyx Warner & Harrell 1957 [Dactylortyx thoracicus calophonus]
- D. t. salvadoranus Dickey & van Rossem 1928 (Salvadorean long-toed partridge)
- D. t. fuscus Conover 1937 (Honduran long-toed partridge)
- D. t. conoveri Warner & Harrell 1957

== Description ==
The singing quail is 20 to 23 cm (7.9 to 9.1 in) long. Males weigh 180 to 266 g (6.3 to 9.4 oz) and females 115 to 206 g (4.1 to 7.3 oz). The smallest birds are found near sea level and the largest in the mountains. Adult males of the nominate subspecies have a dark brown crown, a buff and black "collar", and a tawny orange face with a black streak behind the eye. The back and wings are mottled gray and brown with thin white streaks; the rump is olive brown or gray and has black vermiculation. The breast and belly are grayish brown with white streaks and the lower belly is white. The female has a gray face and white throat and the breast and flanks are paler brown. Juveniles are similar to females but with blackish spots on the underparts. There is much variation among the other subspecies but in general those in mountain forests are darker than those in dryer lowlands.

== Distribution and habitat ==
The singing quail is found in several separate areas in northern, western, and southern Mexico; the Yucatán Peninsula; northern Belize; much of Guatemala, and spottily in El Salvador and Honduras. In general it inhabits the floor of forests with sparse undergrowth; it is also found in older secondary forest, at the edges of old-growth forest, in clear cuts, and coffee plantations. Forest types include subtropical montane forest and cloudforest. In elevation it ranges from sea level to at least 3,000 m (9,800 ft).

== Behavior ==
=== Feeding ===
The singing quail often forages in coveys of three to five birds but groups of up to 12 have been observed. It scratches for food in leaf litter and soil, feeding on bulbs, seeds, and insects.

=== Breeding ===
The singing quail's breeding season appears to span from February to October. Broods of two to four have been recorded in Yucatán. Little else is known about its breeding phenology.

=== Vocalization ===
The singing quail has a "[l]oud, far-carrying, rhythmic song". It "commences with a series of hesitant, plaintive whistles, which increase in frequency and pitch into a rapidly delivered series, on varying pitch" and may be sung by several members of a covey. Coveys also give a weak twittering contact call.

== Status ==
The IUCN has assessed the singing quail as being of Least Concern. It appears to have a population exceeding 100,000 birds, is locally common, and is "apparently more capable of withstanding habitat destruction and fragmentation than other quails" of Middle America. However, "[t]hreats include deforestation, and possibly hunting and grazing in forests."
