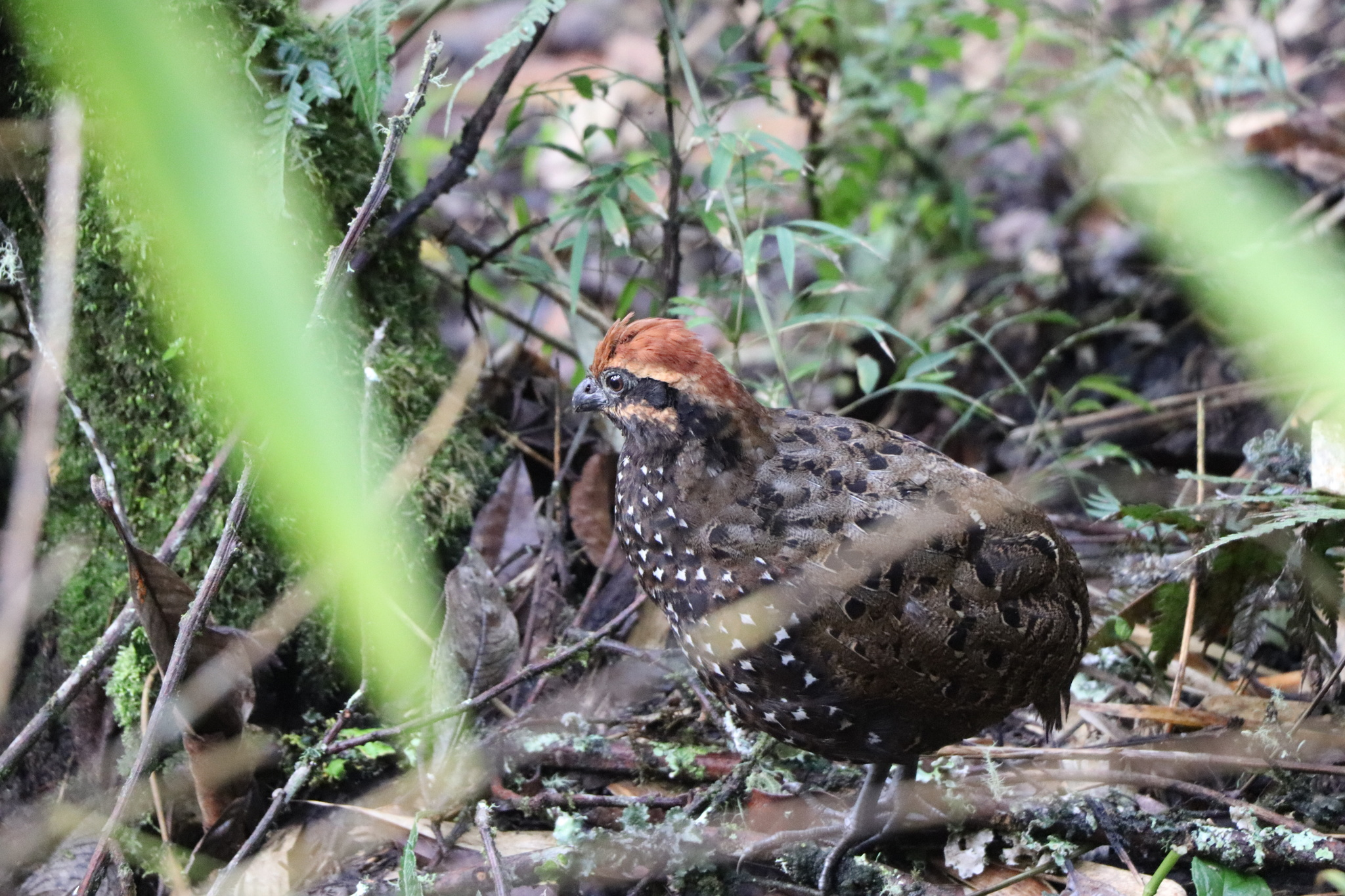

Conservation status
- Least Concern (IUCN 3.1)

Scientific classification
- Kingdom: Animalia
- Phylum: Chordata
- Class: Aves
- Order: Galliformes
- Family: Odontophoridae
- Genus: Odontophorus
- Species: O. balliviani

Binomial name
- Odontophorus balliviani Gould, 1846

= Stripe-faced wood quail =

Species of bird

The stripe-faced wood quail (Odontophorus balliviani) is a species of New World quail. It is found in Bolivia and Peru.

== Taxonomy and systematics ==
The specific epithet of the stripe-faced wood quail commemorates José Ballivián, President of Bolivia at the time of the naming. It is monotypic.

== Description ==
The stripe-faced wood quail is 26 to 28 cm (10 to 11 in) long. Males are estimated to weigh 311 g (11.0 oz) and females 324 g (11.4 oz). The male has a brown face with a patch of bare red skin around the eye and a black line under it. The crown and crest are chestnut with a buff border. The back and rump are brown with black vermiculation. The throat is buff with white streaks and the breast and belly are brown with white diamond-shaped spots. The female is similar, but is paler brown above and more rufous below.

== Distribution and habitat ==
The stripe-faced wood quail is found on the east slope of the Andes in southeastern Peru's Cuzco and Puno Provinces and western Bolivia's La Paz and Cochabamba Departments. It inhabits subtropical montane forest that has many tree ferns, bamboos, and epiphytes. The forest varieties include primary and young secondary forest and stunted cloudforest; it is also found in clearings, wet meadows, and gulleys. In elevation it typically ranges from 1,000 to 3,300 m (3,300 to 10,800 ft) but is occasionally found as low as 800 m (2,600 ft) in Peru.

== Behavior ==
=== Feeding ===
No information about the stripe-faced wood quail's foraging behavior or diet has been published.

=== Breeding ===
Almost nothing is known about the stripe-faced wood quail's breeding phenology. It has been noted singing regularly during May in Bolivia. The eggs measure 3.8 cm × 2.68 cm (1.50 in × 1.06 in) in length and width.

=== Vocalization ===
The stripe-faced wood quail's advertising call is "a rapidly repeated 'whydlyi-i, whydlyi-i....'" given by both members of a pair. They also have a harsh rattling alarm call and chirps that appear to be contact calls.

== Status ==
The IUCN has assessed the stripe-faced wood quail as being of Least Concern. However, its population size is not known and is perhaps declining. "Threats possibly include deforestation, urbanization and agriculture."
