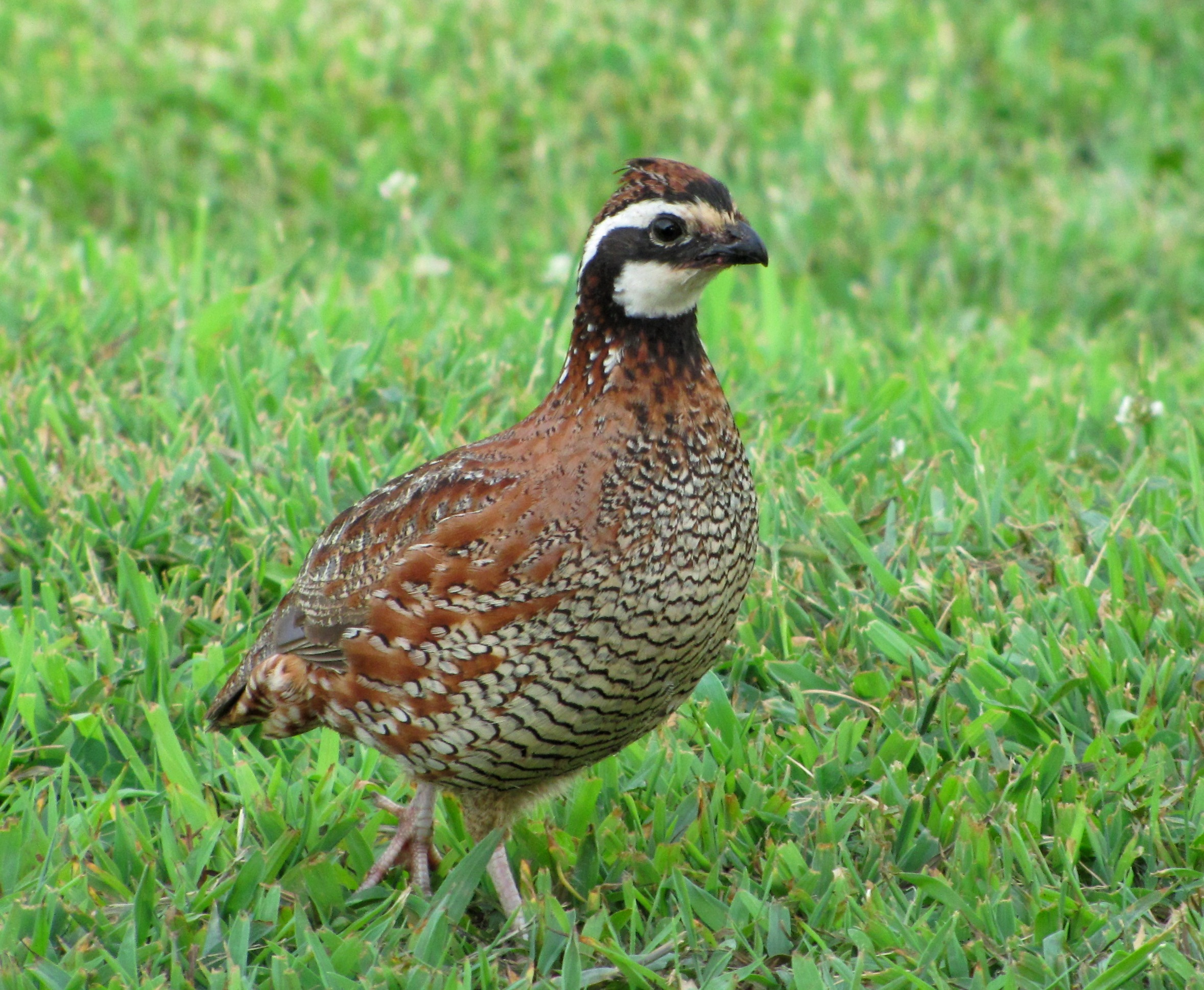
- Northern bobwhite

Scientific classification
- Kingdom: Animalia
- Phylum: Chordata
- Class: Aves
- Order: Galliformes
- Superfamily: Phasianoidea
- Family: Odontophoridae; Gould, 1844

Genera
- Callipepla; Colinus; Cyrtonyx; Dactylortyx; Dendrortyx; Odontophorus; Oreortyx; Philortyx; Ptilopachus; Rhynchortyx

= New World quail =

Family of birds

The New World quail are small birds that, despite their similar appearance and habits to the Old World quail, belong to a different family known as the Odontophoridae. In contrast, the Old World quail are in the Phasianidae family, sharing only a remote phylogenetic connection with their New World counterparts through their mutual classification within the Phasianoidea superfamily. The geographical range of the New World quail extends from Canada to southern Brazil, and two species, the California quail and the bobwhite quail, have been successfully introduced to New Zealand. The stone partridge and Nahan's partridge, both found in Africa, seem to belong to the family. Species are found across a variety of habitats from tropical rainforest to deserts, although a few species are capable of surviving at very low temperatures. There are 34 species divided into 10 genera.

The legs of most New World quails are short but powerful, with some species having very thick legs for digging. They lack the spurs of many Old World galliformes. Although they are capable of short bursts of strong flight, New World quails prefer to walk, and run from danger (or hide), taking off explosively only as a last resort. Plumage varies from dull to spectacular, and many species have ornamental crests or plumes on their heads. Moderate sexual dichromism is seen in plumage, with males having brighter plumage.

== Behaviour and ecology ==
The New World quails are shy diurnal birds and generally live on the ground; even the tree quails, which roost in high trees, generally feed mainly on the ground. They are generalists with regards to their diet, taking insects, seeds, vegetation, and tubers. Desert species in particular consume seeds frequently.

Most of the information about the breeding biology of New World quails comes from North American species, which have been better studied than those of the Neotropics. The family is generally thought to be monogamous, and nests are constructed on the ground. Clutch sizes are large, as is typical within the Galliformes, ranging from three to six eggs for the tree quail and wood quail, and as high as 10–15 for the northern bobwhite. Incubation takes between 16 and 30 days depending on the species. Chicks are precocial and quickly leave the nest to accompany the parents in large family groups.

Northern bobwhite and California quail are popular gamebirds, with many taken by hunters, but these species have also had their ranges increased to meet hunting demand and are not threatened. They are also artificially stocked. Some species are threatened by human activity, such as the bearded tree quail of Mexico, which is threatened by habitat loss and illegal hunting.

== Species ==
Subspecies English names by Çınar 2015.

Subfamily	Image	Genus	Species
Ptilopachinae Bowie, Coehn & Crowe 2013		Ptilopachus Swainson 1837	Nahan's partridge/forest francolin, Ptilopachus nahani(Dubois 1905); Stone partridge/Bantam, Ptilopachus petrosus(Gmelin 1789); P. p. brehmiNeumann 1908 (Kordofan stone partridge); P. p. majorNeumann 1908 (Abyssinian/Ethiopian stone partridge); P. p. florentiaeOgilvie-Grant 1900 (Kenya stone partridge); P. p. petrosus(Gmelin 1789)
Odontophorinae Gould 1844 (New World quails)		Rhynchortyx Ogilvie-Grant 1893	Banded/Tawny-faced quail, Rhynchortyx cinctus(Salvin 1876) Ogilvie-Grant 1893; R. c. pudibundusPeters 1929 (Honduran long-legged colin); R. c. cinctus(Salvin 1876) (long-legged colin); R. c. australisChapman 1915 (southern long-legged colin)
Odontophorinae Gould 1844 (New World quails)		Oreortyx (Douglas 1829) Baird 1858	Mountain quail, Oreortyx pictus(Douglas 1829) Baird 1858; O. p. pictus(Douglas 1829) non Peters (northwestern mountain quail); O. p. plumifer(Gould 1837) (plumed mountain quail); O. p. russelliMiller 1946 (pallid mountain quail); O. p. eremophilusvan Rossem 1937 (desert mountain quail); O. p. confinisAnthony 1889 (southern mountain quail)
Odontophorinae Gould 1844 (New World quails)		Dendrortyx Gould 1844	Bearded wood partridge, Dendrortyx barbatusGould 1846; Buffy-crowned wood partridge, Dendrortyx leucophrys(Gould 1844); D. l. leucophrys(Gould 1844) (Guatemalan/Nicaraguan long-tailed partridge); D. l. hypospodiusSalvin 1896 (Costa Rican long-tailed partridge); Long-tailed wood partridge, Dendrortyx macroura(Jardine & Selby 1828); D. m. macroura(Jardine & Selby 1828) (eastern long-tailed partridge); D. m. griseipectusNelson 1897 (gray-breasted long-tailed partridge); D. m. diversusFriedmann 1943 (Jalisco long-tailed partridge); D. m. striatusNelson 1897 (Guerreran long-tailed partridge); D. m. inesperatusPhillips 1966; D. m. oaxacaeNelson 1897 (Oaxacan long-tailed partridge)
Odontophorinae Gould 1844 (New World quails)		Philortyx Gould 1846 non Des Murs 1854	Banded quail, Philortyx fasciatus(Gould 1844) Gould 1846
Odontophorinae Gould 1844 (New World quails)		Colinus Goldfuss 1820 (Bobwhites)	†Colinus eatoni; †Colinus suiliumBrodkorb 1959; †Colinus hibbardiWetmore 1944; Crested bobwhite, Colinus cristatus(Linnaeus 1766); C. c. mariaeWetmore 1962; C. c. panamensisDickey & van Rossem 1930 (Panama crested quail); C. c. decoratus(Todd 1917) (Magdalena crested quail); C. c. littoralis(Todd 1917) (littoral crested quail); C. c. cristatus(Linnaeus 1766); C. c. horvathi(Madarász 1904) (Horvath's quail); C. c. barnesiGilliard 1940; C. c. sonnini(Temminck 1815) (Sonnini's crested quail); C. c. mocquerysi(Hartert 1894) (Mocquerys's/Cumana crested quail); C. c. leucotis(Gould 1844) (white-eared crested quail); C. c. badiusConover 1938 (Cauca Valley crested quail); C. c. bogotensisDugand 1943 (Bogotá crested bobwhite); C. c. parvicristatus(Gould 1843) (short-crested quail); Spot-bellied bobwhite, Colinus leucopogon(Lesson 1842); C. l. incanusFriedmann 1944 (Guatemalan white-breasted bobwhite); C. l. hypoleucus(Gould 1860) (Salvadorean White-breasted Bobwhite); C. l. leucopogon(Lesson 1842) (white-throated quail); C. l. leylandi(Moore 1859) (Leyland's spot-bellied quail); C. l. sclateri(Bonaparte 1856) (Sclater's spot-bellied bobwhite); C. l. dickeyiConover 1932 (Dickey's spot-bellied bobwhite); Yucatán/Black-throated bobwhite, Colinus nigrogularis(Gould 1843); C. n. cabotivan Tyne & Trautman 1941; C. n. persiccusvan Tyne & Trautman 1941 (Progreso black-throated bobwhite); C. n. nigrogularis(Gould 1843); C. n. segoviensisRidgway 1888 (Honduran black-throated quail); masked/Northern bobwhite, Colinus virginianus (Linnaeus 1758); C. v. graysoni subspecies-group; C. v. graysoni(Lawrence 1867) (Grayson's Bobwhite); C. v. nigripectusNelson 1897 (puebla northern bobwhite); C. v. pectoralis subspecies-group; C. v. pectoralis(Gould 1843) (black-breasted bobwhite); C. v. godmaniNelson 1897 (Godman's northern bobwhite); C. v. minorNelson 1901 (least northern bobwhite); C. v. thayeriBangs & Peters 1928 (Thayer's northern bobwhite); C. v. coyolcos subspecies-group; C. v. nelsoni (Nelson's bobwhite); C. v. ridgwayiBrewster 1885 (Masked northern Bobwhite); C. v. insignisNelson 1897 (Guatemalan northern bobwhite); C. v. salviniNelson 1897 (Salvin's northern bobwhite); C. v. coyolcos(Statius Müller 1776) (coyolcos Bobwhite); C. v. harrisoniOrr & Webster 1968 (Harrison's bobwhite); C. v. atriceps(Ogilvie-Grant 1893) (black-headed northern bobwhite); C. v. virginianus subspecies-group; C. v. aridus(Lawrence 1853) Aldrich 1942 (Jaumave northern bobwhite); C. v. cubanensis(Gray 1846) (Cuban bobwhite); C. v. floridanus(Coues 1872) (Florida bobwhite); C. v. maculatus(Nelson 1899) (spot-bellied northern bobwhite); C. v. virginianus(Linnaeus 1758) (Eastern bobwhite); C. v. taylori(Lincoln 1915) (plains bobwhite); C. v. texanus(Lawrence 1853) (Texas bobwhite)
Odontophorinae Gould 1844 (New World quails)		Callipepla Wagler 1832 (Crested quails)	†Callipepla shotwelli(Brodkorb 1958); Scaled quail/blue quail Callipepla squamata(Vigors 1830); C. s. pallidaBrewster 1881 (northern scaled quail); C. s. hargraveiRea 1973 (Upper Sonoran scaled quail); C. s. castanogastrisBrewster 1883 (chestnut-bellied scaled quail); C. s. squamata(Vigors 1830) (Altiplano scaled quail); Elegant quail, Callipepla douglasii(Vigors 1829); C. d. douglasii(Vigors 1829) (Douglas's elegant quail); C. d. bensoniRidgway 1887 (Benson's elegant quail); C. d. vanderbilti (Islas Marías elegant quail); C. d. teres(Friedmann 1943) (Jalisco elegant quail); California quail, Callipepla californica(Shaw 1798); C. c. brunnescens(Ridgway 1884) (coastal California quail); C. c. canfieldae(van Rossem 1939) (Owen Valley quail); C. c. californica(Shaw 1798) (valley California quail); C. c. catalinensis(Grinnell 1906) (Santa Catalina California quail); C. c. achrustera(Peters 1923) (San Lucas California quail); Gambel's quail, Callipepla gambelii(Gambel 1843); C. g. gambelii(Gambel 1843) (southwestern Gambel's quail); C. g. ignoscensFriedmann 1943 (Texas Gambel's quail); C. g. fulvipectusNelson 1899 (fulvous-breasted Gambel's quail); C. g. stephensiPhillips 1959 (Stephen's Gambel's quail)
Odontophorinae Gould 1844 (New World quails)		Cyrtonyx Gould 1844	†Cyrtonyx cookiGutierrez et al. 1981; Ocellated quail, Cyrtonyx ocellatus(Gould 1837); Montezuma quail, Cyrtonyx montezumae(Vigors 1830); C. m. mearnsiNelson 1900 (Mearns's Montezuma quail); C. m. montezumae(Vigors 1830) (Massena harlequin quail); Spot-breasted quail, Cyrtonyx sallei(Verreaux 1859); C. s. rowleyiPhillips 1966; C. s. salleiVerreaux 1859 (Salle's spot-breasted quail)
Odontophorinae Gould 1844 (New World quails)		Dactylortyx (Gambel 1848) Ogilvie-Grant 1893	long-toed/Singing quail, Dactylortyx thoracicus(Gambel 1848) Ogilvie-Grant 1893; D. t. pettingilliWarner & Harrell 1957; D. t. thoracicus(Gambel 1848) (Veracruz singing quail); D. t. sharpeiNelson 1903 (Yucatán singing quail); D. t. paynteriWarner & Harrell 1955; D. t. deviusNelson 1898 (Jaliscan singing quail); D. t. melodusWarner & Harrell 1957; D. t. chiapensisNelson 1898 (Chiapan singing quail); D. t. dolichonyxWarner & Harrell 1957 [Dactylortyx thoracicus calophonus]; D. t. salvadoranusDickey & van Rossem 1928 (Salvadorean long-toed partridge); D. t. fuscusConover 1937 (Honduran long-toed partridge); D. t. conoveriWarner & Harrell 1957
Odontophorinae Gould 1844 (New World quails)		Odontophorus Vieillot 1816 (wood quails)	Spotted wood quail, Odontophorus guttatus(Gould 1838); Marbled wood quail, Odontophorus gujanensis(Gmelin 1789); O. g. castigatusBangs 1901 (Chiriquí partridge); O. g. marmoratus(Gould 1843) (marbled partridge); O. g. mediusChapman 1929 (Duida partridge); O. g. gujanensis(Gmelin 1789) (Guianan partridge); O. g. buckleyiChubb 1919 (Buckley's partridge); O. g. rufogularisBlake 1959; O. g. pachyrhynchusTschudi 1844 (thick-billed partridge); O. g. simonsiChubb 1919 (Simon's partridge); Starred wood quail, Odontophorus stellatus(Gould 1843); Spot-winged wood quail, Odontophorus capueira(von Spix 1825); Black-eared wood quail, Odontophorus melanotisSalvin 1865; O. m. verecundusPeters 1929 (Honduran partridge); O. m. melanotisSalvin 1865 (black-eared wood quail); Rufous-fronted wood quail, Odontophorus erythropsGould 1859; O. e. parambaeRothschild 1897 (Paramba quail); O. e. erythropsGould 1859 (chestnut-eared partridge); Stripe-faced wood quail, Odontophorus ballivianiGould 1846; Chestnut wood quail, Odontophorus hyperythrusGould 1858; Dark-backed wood quail, Odontophorus melanonotusGould 1861; Rufous-breasted wood quail, Odontophorus speciosusTschudi 1843; O. s. soderstromiiLönnberg & Rendahl 1922 (Soderstrom's partridge); O. s. speciosusTschudi 1843 (rufous-breasted partridge); O. s. loricatusTodd 1932 (Bolivian partridge); Tacarcuna wood quail, Odontophorus dialeucosWetmore 1963; Gorgeted wood quail, Odontophorus strophium(Gould 1844); Venezuelan wood quail, Odontophorus columbianusGould 1850; Black-breasted wood quail, Odontophorus leucolaemusSalvin 1867; Black-fronted wood quail, Odontophorus atrifronsAllen 1900; O. a. atrifronsAllen 1900 (black-fronted partridge); O. a. variegatusTodd 1919 (variegated partridge); O. a. navaiAveledo & Pons 1952

=== Fossils ===
- Genus †Miortyx Miller 1944
  - †Miortyx teres Miller 1944
  - †Miortyx aldeni Howard 1966
- Genus †Nanortyx Weigel 1963
  - †Nanortyx inexpectatus Weigel 1963
- Genus †Neortyx Holman 1961
  - †Neortyx peninsularis Holman 1961

== Phylogeny ==
Position within the Galliformes.

- - Galliformes
    - - Megapodiidae – megapodes (21 species)
      - - Cracidae – chachalacas, curassows, guans (56 species)
        - - Numididae – guineafowl (6 species)
          - - Odontophoridae – New World quail (34 species)
            - Phasianidae – pheasants & allies (184 species)

Phylogeny of the Galliformes based a study by De Chen and collaborators published in 2021. The number of species are from the list maintained by Frank Gill, Pamela Rasmussen and David Donsker on behalf of the International Ornithologists' Union.

Living Odontophoridae based on the work by John Boyd.

- - Ptilopachinae
    - Ptilopachus
      - P. nahani (Dubois 1905)
      - P. petrosus (Gmelin 1789)
  - Odontophorinae
    - Rhynchortyx cinctus (Salvin 1876) Ogilvie-Grant 1893
    - - - Oreortyx pictus (Douglas 1829) Baird 1858
        - - Dendrortyx
            - ?D. leucophrys (Gould 1844)
            - D. barbatus Gould 1846
            - D. macroura (Jardine & Selby 1828)
          - - Philortyx fasciatus (Gould 1844) Gould 1846
            - - Callipepla
                - - C. squamata (Vigors 1830)
                  - C. douglasii (Vigors 1829)
                - - C. gambelii (Gambel 1843)
                  - C. californica (Shaw 1798)
              - Colinus
                - ?C. leucopogon (Lesson 1842)
                - C. cristatus (Linnaeus 1766)
                - - C. nigrogularis (Gould 1843)
                  - C. virginianus (Linnaeus 1758)
      - - Cyrtonyx
          - C. ocellatus (Gould 1837)
          - C. montezumae (Vigors 1830)
        - - Dactylortyx thoracicus (Gambel 1848) Ogilvie-Grant 1893
          - Odontophorus
            - O. guttatus (Gould 1838)
            - - - O. gujanensis (Gmelin 1789)
                - - - O. stellatus (Gould 1843)
                    - O. capueira (von Spix 1825)
                  - - O. melanotis Salvin 1865
                    - O. erythrops Gould 1859
              - - O. balliviani Gould 1846
                - - - ?O. hyperythrus Gould 1858
                    - ?O. melanonotus Gould 1861
                    - O. speciosus Tschudi 1843
                  - - ?O. dialeucos Wetmore 1963
                    - ?O. strophium (Gould 1844)
                    - ?O. columbianus Gould 1850
                    - ?O. leucolaemus Salvin 1867
                    - O. atrifrons Allen 1900

== See also ==
- Quail eggs
- List of Galliformes
