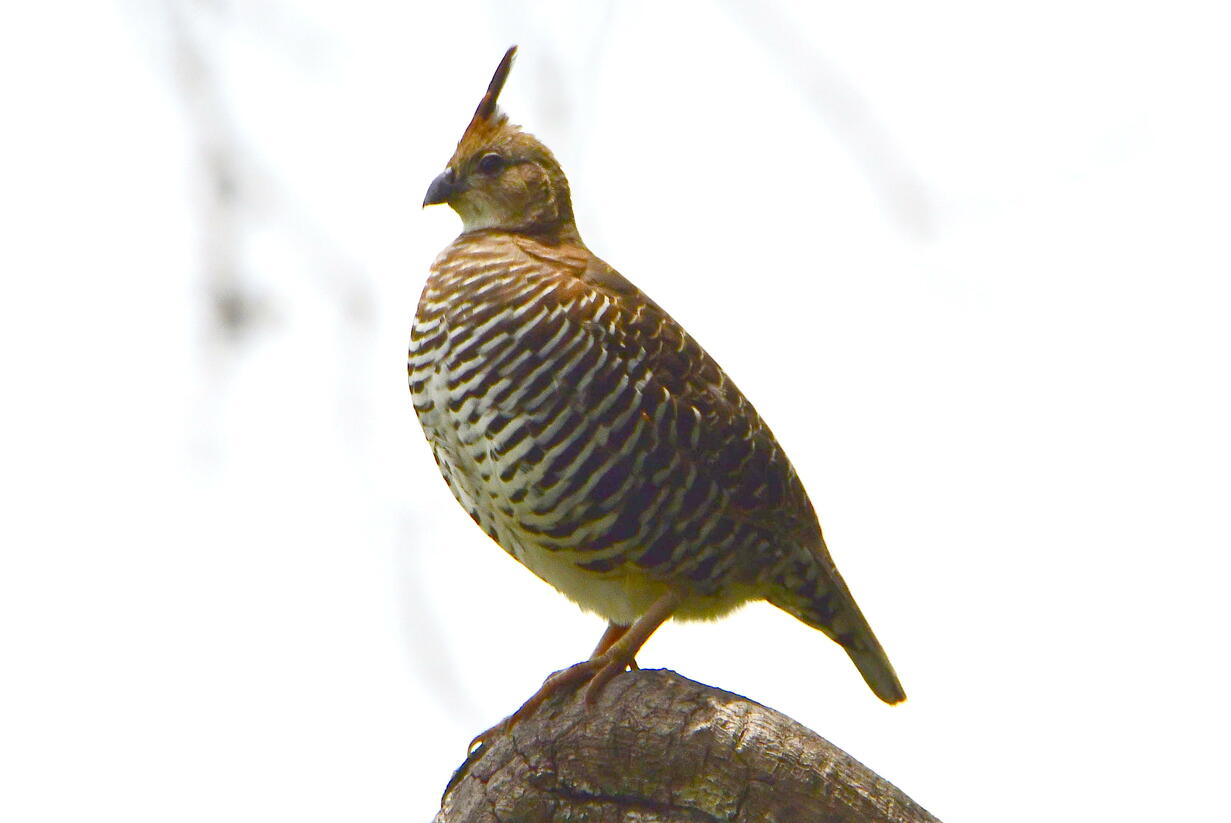

Conservation status
- Least Concern (IUCN 3.1)

Scientific classification
- Kingdom: Animalia
- Phylum: Chordata
- Class: Aves
- Order: Galliformes
- Family: Odontophoridae
- Genus: Philortyx; Gould, 1846
- Species: P. fasciatus

Binomial name
- Philortyx fasciatus (Gould, 1844)

= Banded quail =

Species of bird

The banded quail (Philortyx fasciatus) is a species of bird in the family Odontophoridae. It is found only in Mexico where its natural habitats are subtropical or tropical dry forests, subtropical or tropical dry shrubland, subtropical or tropical high-altitude shrubland, and heavily degraded former forest.

== Description ==
The banded quail is an inconspicuous brown bird with a comparatively long tail. It has a dark crest on its head, its throat is pale and its under tail-coverts are barred in black and white. The juvenile plumage is streaked with white at first but after a moult at eight to twelve weeks the plumage is similar to that of the adults apart from a nearly black face and throat. The full adult plumage develops at sixteen to twenty weeks.

== Distribution and habitat ==
The banded quail is endemic to western central Mexico where its main habitat is dry scrubby countryside with shrubs but it also sometimes moves onto cultivated land and pasture. It is commonest in the region bordering on the Balsas River. Its elevational range is from sea level up to about 1,800 metres (5,900 ft) and it is a non-migratory species.

== Behaviour ==
The banded quail is a ground-dwelling bird usually found in groups of about a dozen birds although sometimes larger groups of up to thirty are seen. It is a shy bird that seldom strays far from cover. When alarmed, it tends to run rather than fly, but when a group take to the wing, the individuals fly off in different directions which may confuse a potential predator. It feeds on a variety of seeds and on tubers, buds and insects, increasing the proportion of animal food when there are chicks to be fed. Breeding takes place between August and September and the crest is used during display behaviour. About five eggs are laid in a grass-lined nest that may be partially roofed and the incubation period is about twenty two days.

== Status ==
The banded quail is found over a range of about 90,800 square kilometres (35,100 sq mi) and the total number of individual birds is estimated to be somewhere between 50,000 and 500,000. The bird is hunted for food but the population size seems to be stable and the bird faces no other particular threats so the IUCN has listed it as being of "Least Concern" in its Red List of Threatened Species.
