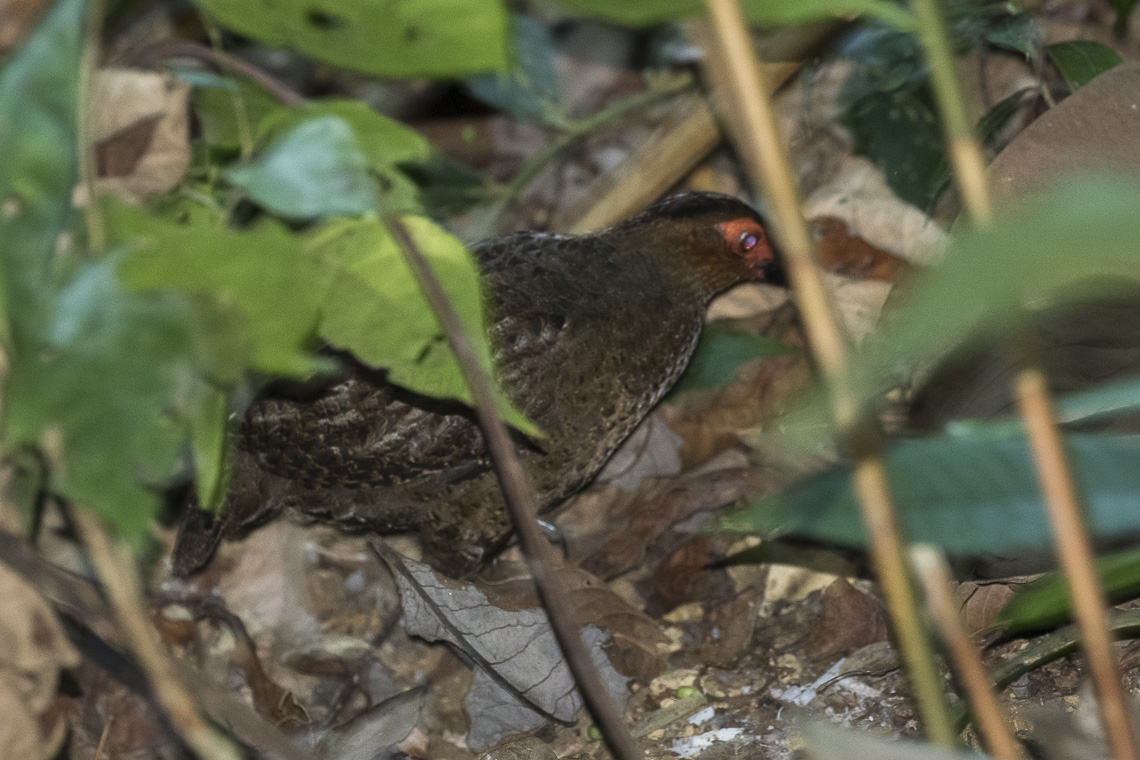

Conservation status
- Least Concern (IUCN 3.1)

Scientific classification
- Kingdom: Animalia
- Phylum: Chordata
- Class: Aves
- Order: Galliformes
- Family: Odontophoridae
- Genus: Odontophorus
- Species: O. gujanensis

Binomial name
- Odontophorus gujanensis (Gmelin, JF, 1789)

= Marbled wood quail =

Species of bird

The marbled wood quail (Odontophorus gujanensis), also known as the Amazonian wood quail, is a species of bird in the New World quail family. It has an extensive distribution in Central America and the northern part of South America. Its natural habitat is subtropical or tropical moist lowland forests.

== Taxonomy ==
The marbled wood quail was formally described in 1789 by the German naturalist Johann Friedrich Gmelin in his revised and expanded edition of Carl Linnaeus's Systema Naturae. He placed it with the other quail like birds in the genus Tetrao and coined the binomial name Tetrao gujanensis. Gmelin based his description on the Comte de Buffon's "Le Tocro ou Perdrix de la Guyane" and John Latham's "Guiana partridge". The marbled wood quail is now placed with around 14 other species in the genus Odontophorus that was introduced in 1816 by the French ornithologist Louis Pierre Vieillot. The genus name Odontophorus is from Ancient Greek meaning "bearing teeth", from odous "tooth" and pherō "to carry". The specific epithet gujanensis means "from the Guianas".

Eight subspecies are recognised:

- O. g. castigatus Bangs, 1901 – southwest Costa Rica and northwest Panama
- O. g. marmoratus (Gould, 1843) – east Panama, north Colombia and northwest Venezuela
- O. g. medius Chapman, 1929 – south Venezuela and northwest Brazil
- O. g. gujanensis (Gmelin, JF, 1789) – southeast Venezuela, the Guianas, Brazil and n Paraguay
- O. g. buckleyi Chubb, C, 1919 – south, east Colombia, east Ecuador and north Peru
- O. g. rufogularis Blake, 1959 – northeast Peru
- O. g. pachyrhynchus Tschudi, 1844 – east-central Peru and west Bolivia
- O. g. simonsi Chubb, C, 1919 – north, east Bolivia

== Description ==
Adult marbled wood quails grow to a length of between 23 and 29 cm (9 and 11 in). The bill is stout and dark-coloured and the legs and feet are bluish-grey. The iris of the eye is brown and there is orange or red bare skin around the eye. The sexes are similar in appearance; the front of the crown and cheeks are reddish-brown and the dark brown, vermiculated feathers on the crown are ruffled to form a short, loose crest. The mantle and neck are greyish-brown, the back and wings are brown with black vermiculations and the rump and upper-tail coverts are indistinctly spotted with paler colour. The underparts are drab brown with some indistinct barring in buff and darker brown. Juvenile birds are similar in appearance to the adults but have reddish-orange bills and non-vermiculated, reddish-brown crests.

== Distribution and habitat ==
The marbled wood quail has an extensive distribution in Central America and the northern part of South America. Its range extends from Costa Rica and Panama, where it is feared extinct, to Colombia, Venezuela, Peru, the Guianas and Brazil. It is a ground-dwelling bird, inhabiting the undergrowth in lowland rainforests and cloud forests, occurring at elevations of up to 900 m (3,000 ft) in Ecuador, 1,500 m (4,900 ft) in Colombia and 1,500 m (4,900 ft) in Venezuela.

== Behavior and ecology ==
The marbled wood quail is an elusive bird, moving about in the undergrowth and seldom seen, but its distinctive calls can often be heard, particularly at dawn and dusk. It sometimes emerges into the open but stays close to fallen trees or scrub to facilitate an easy retreat. On disturbance, it tends to move away quietly on foot, but will burst into flight if necessary. It usually occurs in small groups that move in single file, foraging through the leaf litter for invertebrates and fallen fruits. Nests are sometimes found at the foot of a tree, with about four white eggs, sometimes spotted with brown, in a shallow scrape concealed under a roof of dead leaves; the breeding season varies with locality.

== Status ==
The total number of marbled wood quails are thought to be decreasing as their forest habitat in the Amazon basin is increasingly being cleared to provide grazing land for cattle and agricultural land for Soybean production. They are to some extent adaptable to living in secondary growth forest, but the increasing road network puts them at risk of increased hunting. The International Union for Conservation of Nature expects the population to dwindle by 25 to 30% over the next three generations of birds and has assessed their conservation status as being "near threatened".
