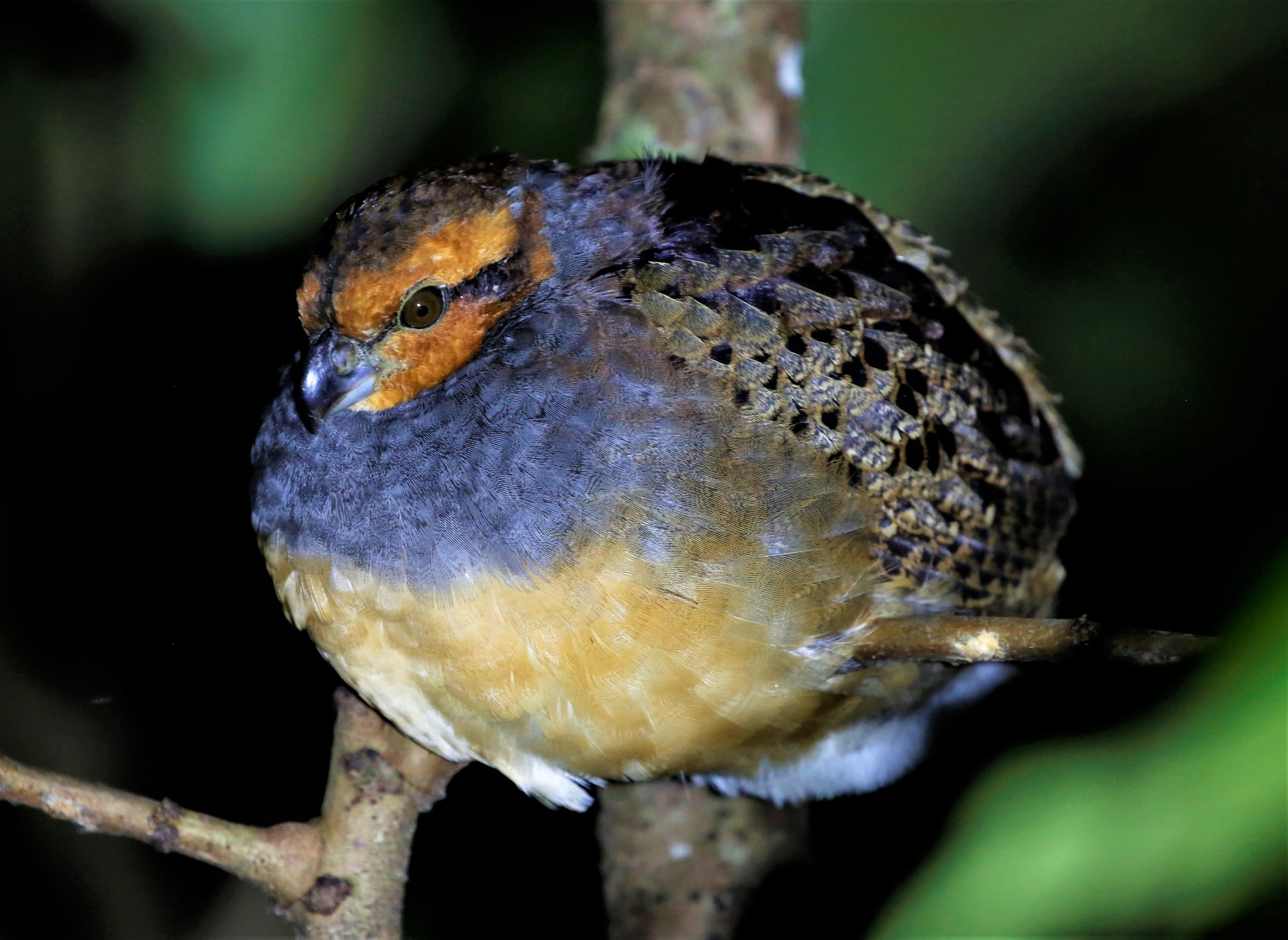

Conservation status
- Near Threatened (IUCN 3.1)

Scientific classification
- Kingdom: Animalia
- Phylum: Chordata
- Class: Aves
- Order: Galliformes
- Family: Odontophoridae
- Genus: Rhynchortyx; Ogilvie-Grant, 1893
- Species: R. cinctus

Binomial name
- Rhynchortyx cinctus (Salvin, 1876)

= Tawny-faced quail =

Species of bird

The tawny-faced quail (Rhynchortyx cinctus) is a species of bird in the family Odontophoridae, the New World quail. It is found in Colombia, Costa Rica, Ecuador, Honduras, Nicaragua, and Panama.

== Taxonomy and systematics ==
The tawny-faced quail is the only member of genus Rhynchortyx. It has three subspecies, the nominate R. c. cinctus, R. c. pudibundus, and R. c. australis.

== Description ==
The tawny-faced quail is 17 to 20 cm (6.7 to 7.9 in) long. A male weighed 165 g (5.8 oz) and an unsexed individual 150 g (5.3 oz). The adult male of the nominate subspecies has a reddish face with a black streak through the eye. Its crown and hindneck are dark brown; the back and rump are gray to brown with black streaks. Its throat and upper breast are gray while the rest of the undersides are tawny buff with some white between the legs. The nominate adult female has a similar pattern but is generally browner. Its crown and back are dark brown and the rump mottled brown and chestnut. The face and upper breast are reddish brown and the eyeline, chin, and throat white. The lower breast and belly are pale with black barring. R. c. pudibundus is paler overall and R. c. australis darker.

== Distribution and habitat ==
The tawny-faced quail has a discontinuous range. The nominate subspecies is found in Costa Rica and Panama. R. c. pudibundus is found in northeastern Honduras and eastern Nicaragua. R. c. australis is found on the Pacific coasts of Colombia and far northern Ecuador. The species inhabits lowland tropical forest up to about 1,450 m (4,760 ft) of elevation. It is primarily terrestrial but roosts in trees and bushes near the ground.

== Behavior ==
=== Feeding ===
The tawny-faced quail forages by pecking. Its diet has been recorded to include seeds, worms, and insects.

=== Breeding ===
The tawny-faced quail's breeding season includes March and April in Panama but has not been documented elsewhere. Little other information about its breeding phenology has been published.

=== Vocalization ===
The tawny-faced quail's song is "a series of pure monotonous whistles followed by a series of whistles at a lower and/or higher pitch" and has been likened to that those of tinamous or doves. The species is often vocal at dusk but also sings while roosting at night. Members of a covey keep in contact with soft peeping calls.

== Status ==
The IUCN has assessed the tawny-faced quail as being near threatened. It is rather rare in much of its range, and "[m]ajor threats possibly include deforestation and hunting."
