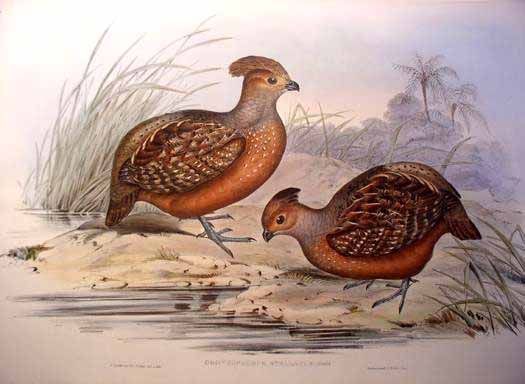

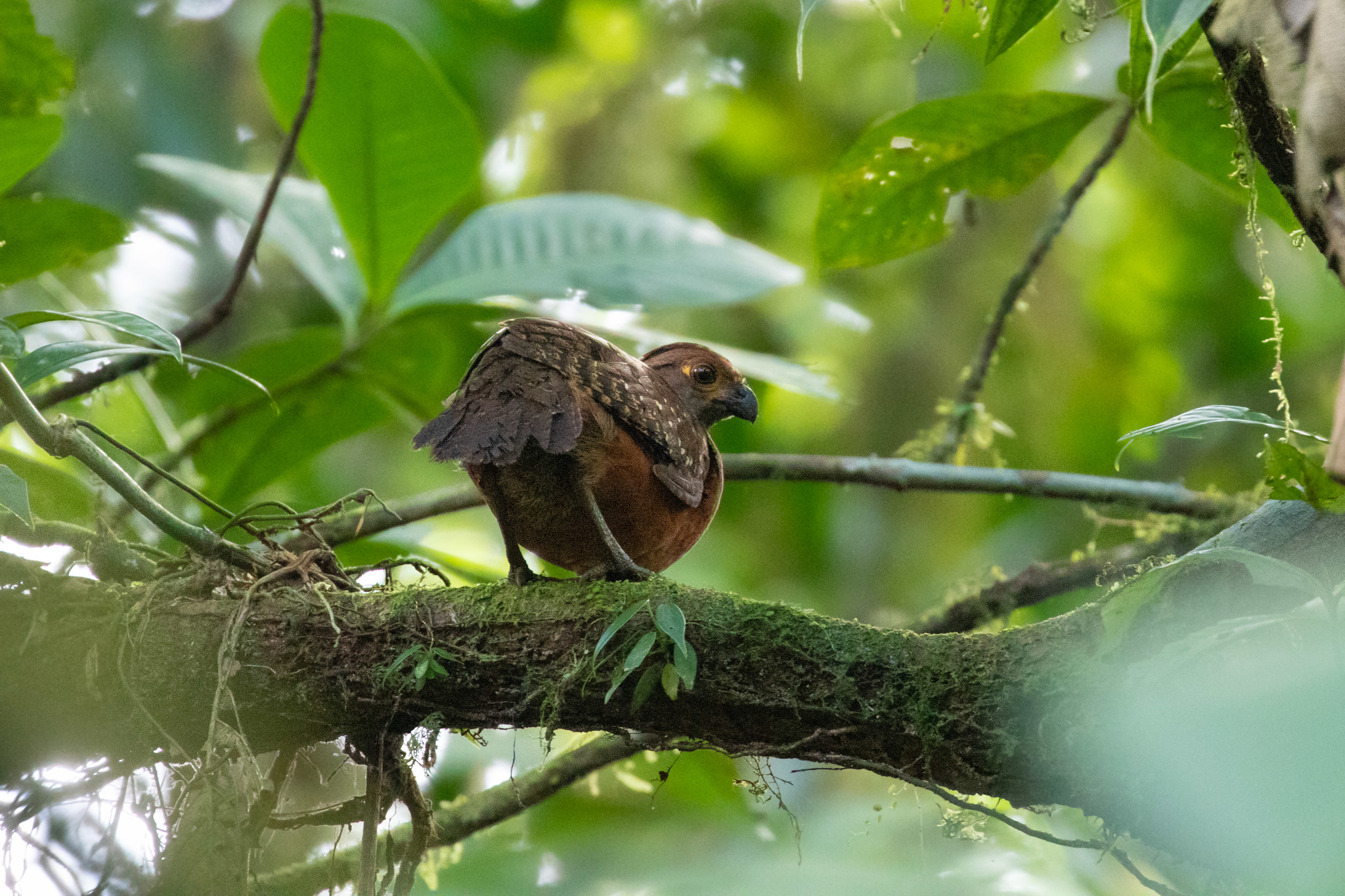

Conservation status
- Least Concern (IUCN 3.1)

Scientific classification
- Kingdom: Animalia
- Phylum: Chordata
- Class: Aves
- Order: Galliformes
- Family: Odontophoridae
- Genus: Odontophorus
- Species: O. stellatus

Binomial name
- Odontophorus stellatus (Gould, 1843)

= Starred wood quail =

Species of bird

The starred wood quail (Odontophorus stellatus) is a species of bird in the family Odontophoridae (New World quail). It is found in subtropical or tropical moist lowland forests of Bolivia, Brazil, Ecuador, and Peru.

== Description ==
The starred wood quail is between about 24 and 28 cm (9.4 and 11.0 in) long, males being slightly larger than females. The bill is blackish, the irises brown and the legs grey, and the long feathers on the back of the head form a pronounced crest, reddish-brown in the male and brownish-black in the female. Other than this, the sexes are very similar in appearance; the front of the crown is dark brown and the rest of the head, neck, throat and mantle is grey. The general colour of the upper parts is olive-brown, marked with darker vermiculations, paler on the rump and darker on the wings and scapulars, with large black markings on the flight feathers and pale speckling on the wing coverts. The underparts are reddish-brown with white speckling on the sides of the breast and dark barring near the vent. The juvenile is similar but has an orange or reddish bill.

== Ecology ==
A retiring and elusive bird, its presence in an area is disclosed by its distinctive two-syllable call, korkorralo, korkorralo, korkorralo, which it utters repeatedly at dusk. The birds form coveys of five to eight and cross open ground in single file, keeping close to dense cover into which they can run if disturbed. They forage through the leaf litter for invertebrates and fruits. Little is known about their breeding habits.

== Distribution ==
The species is native to eastern Ecuador, much of Peru, western Brazil and northern Bolivia. It is typically found in moist lowland forests, including terre firme forests, flooding areas and transitional areas, below about 1,050 m (3,445 ft) (lower in Ecuador).

== Status ==
Odontophorus stellatus has a very wide distribution and is common in at least part of its range. The total population is thought to be declining but not at a sufficiently fast rate as to warrant putting the bird in a threatened category, so the International Union for Conservation of Nature has assessed its conservation status as being of "least concern".
