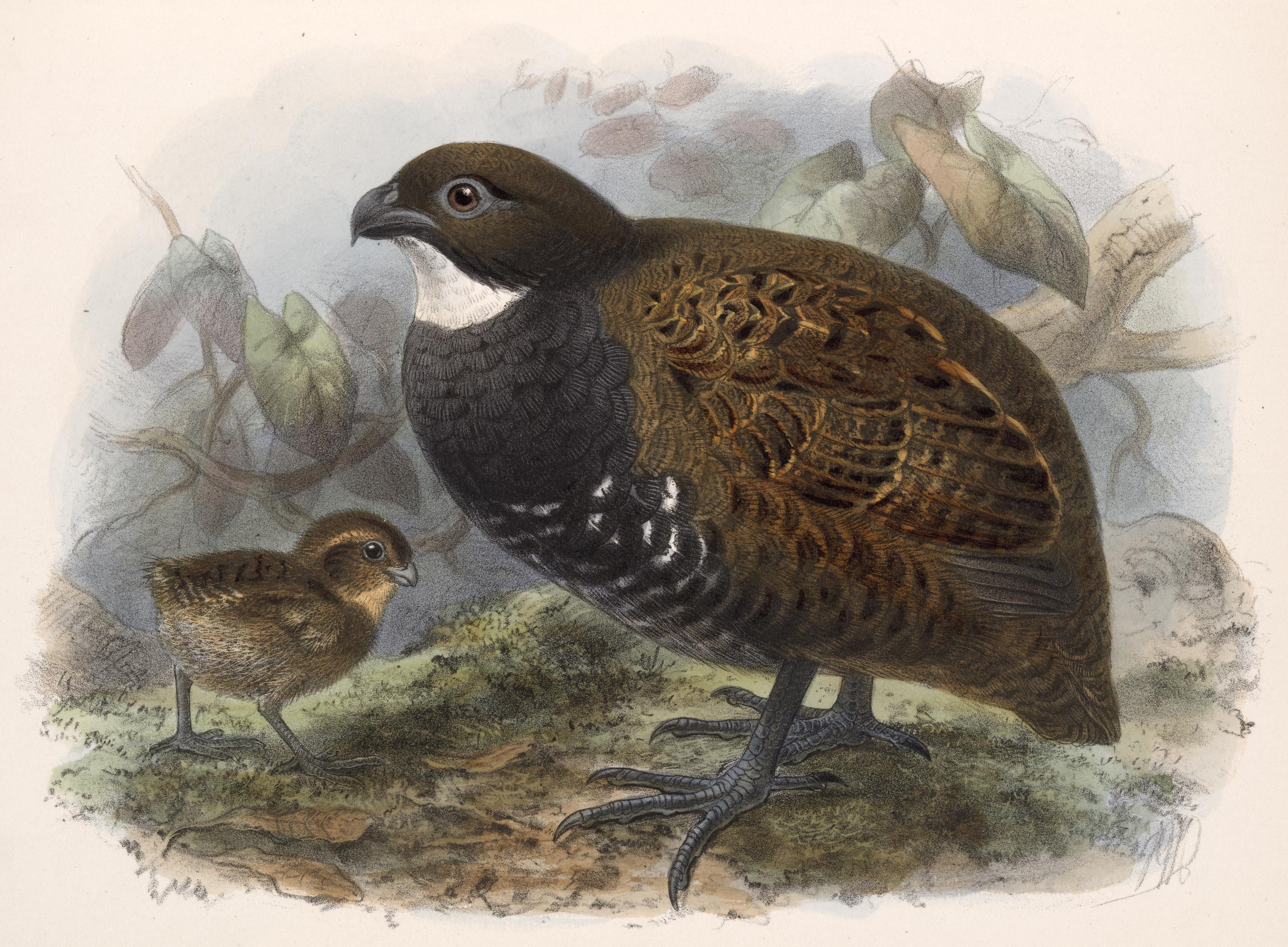
- Odontophorus leucolaemus

Scientific classification
- Kingdom: Animalia
- Phylum: Chordata
- Class: Aves
- Order: Galliformes
- Family: Odontophoridae
- Subfamily: Odontophorinae
- Genus: Odontophorus; Vieillot, 1816

Type species
- Tetrao gujanensis (marbled wood quail) Gmelin, JF, 1789

Species
- See species list

= Wood quail =

Genus of birds

The wood quails are birds in the genus Odontophorus of the New World quail family, which are residents in forests in the Americas. The core range of the genus is centered in the lowlands and foothills of the northern Andes of Colombia and the mountain ranges of Central America; however, some species occur elsewhere in tropical and subtropical South America.

These are shy species, and as a consequence are amongst the most difficult galliform birds to study or even observe. The best chance of seeing wood quail is at dawn or dusk, when they may feed at the side of a road or on a forest track in family groups up to 12 birds. Nevertheless, when protected, they can become surprisingly tame, as has been shown at Paz de las Aves near Mindo, Ecuador, with the dark-backed wood quail.

Wood quail are 22–30 cm long, dumpy, short-tailed, stout-billed partridge-like birds with a bushy crest. The upper parts are dark brown, and the under parts are black, grey, brown, or rufous. Some species have a striking black and white throat or facial markings. The sexes are similar, but in some species, the female has a duller-coloured crest, and in others the under parts are more rufous or grey than in the male. The advertising calls are loud and distinctive duets consisting of repeated phrases, and are often the only indication that wood quail are present.

For most wood quail, information has mainly come from specimens, and breeding behaviour and habits are little known. The majority of species, including the relatively widespread spotted wood quail have never had their nests described.

Those species for which the feeding habits are known forage on the ground, scratching at the soil for seeds, fallen fruit, and insects. Wood quail are typically shy and wary; they normally make good their escape on foot, but if startled, explode into a short, fast flight into dense cover.

All wood quail species have been adversely affected by hunting and, in particular, rampant deforestation. Several species with restricted ranges are now considered threatened.

== Taxonomy ==
The genus Odontophorus was introduced in 1816 by the French ornithologist Louis Pierre Vieillot to accommodate a single species, the marbled wood quail, which is therefore the type species. The genus name Odontophorus is from Ancient Greek meaning "bearing teeth", from odous "tooth" and pherō "to carry". The genus now contains 15 species.

== Species ==
Image	Common name	Name	Distribution
	Marbled wood quail	Odontophorus gujanensis	Bolivia, Brazil, Colombia, Costa Rica, Ecuador, French Guiana, Guyana, Panama, Peru, Suriname, and Venezuela
	Spot-winged wood quail	Odontophorus capueira	Brazil, Argentina and Paraguay, and formerly in Uruguay
	Black-eared wood quail	Odontophorus melanotis	Honduras, Nicaragua, Costa Rica and Panama
	Rufous-fronted wood quail	Odontophorus erythrops	Colombia and Ecuador
	Black-fronted wood quail	Odontophorus atrifrons	Colombia and Venezuela
	Chestnut wood quail	Odontophorus hyperythrus	Colombia.
	Dark-backed wood quail	Odontophorus melanonotus	Colombia and Ecuador
	Rufous-breasted wood quail	Odontophorus speciosus	Bolivia, Ecuador, and Peru
	Tacarcuna wood quail	Odontophorus dialeucos	Colombia and Panama.
	Gorgeted wood quail	Odontophorus strophium	Colombia
	Venezuelan wood quail	Odontophorus columbianus	Venezuela
	Black-breasted wood quail	Odontophorus leucolaemus	Costa Rica and Panama
	Stripe-faced wood quail	Odontophorus balliviani	southern Peru and Bolivia
	Starred wood quail	Odontophorus stellatus	Bolivia, Brazil, Ecuador, and Peru
	Spotted wood quail	Odontophorus guttatus	Central America from southern Mexico to western Panama
