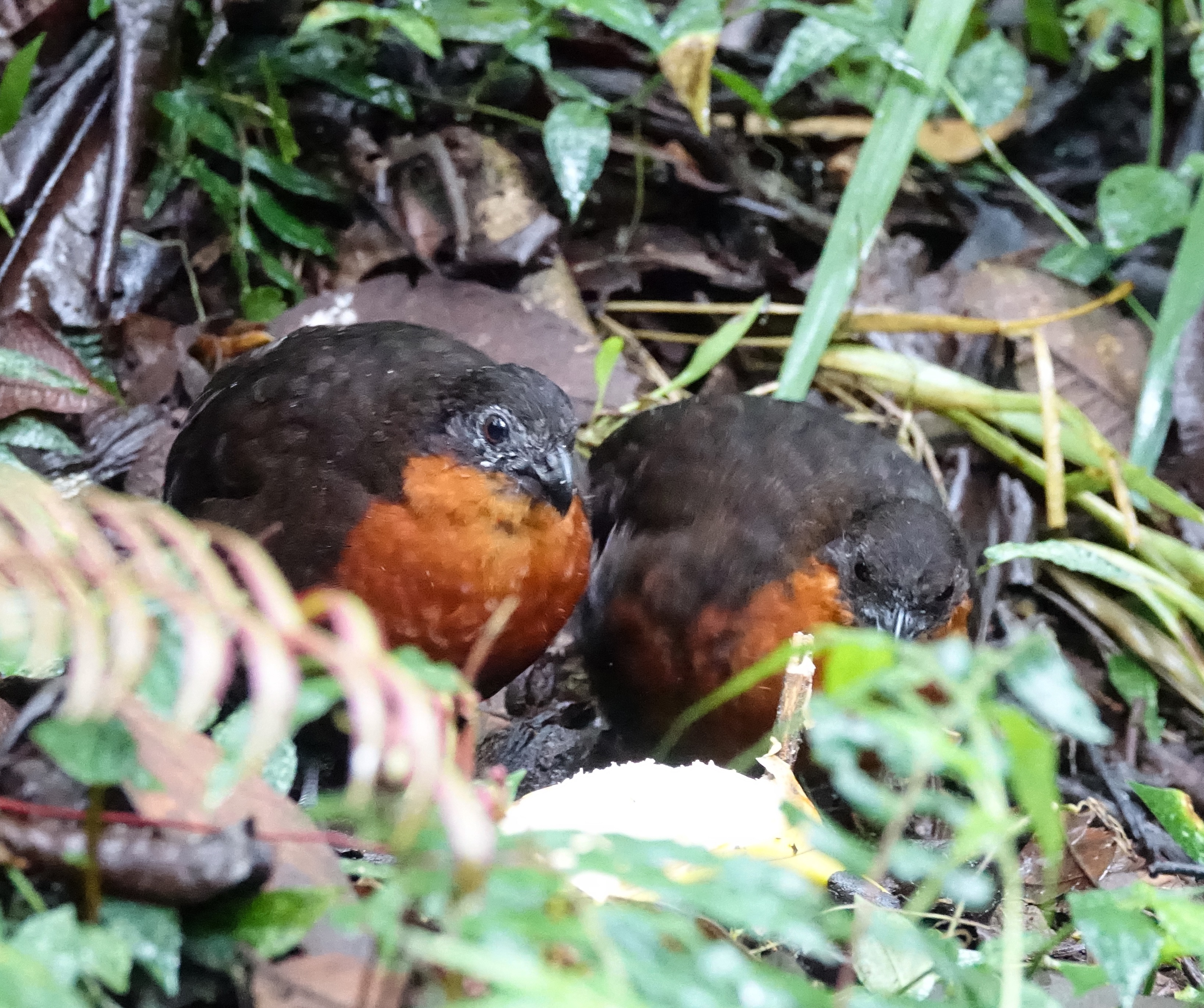

Conservation status
- Least Concern (IUCN 3.1)

Scientific classification
- Kingdom: Animalia
- Phylum: Chordata
- Class: Aves
- Order: Galliformes
- Family: Odontophoridae
- Genus: Odontophorus
- Species: O. erythrops

Binomial name
- Odontophorus erythrops Gould, 1859

= Rufous-fronted wood quail =

Species of bird

The rufous-fronted wood quail (Odontophorus erythrops) is a species of bird in the family Odontophoridae, the New World quail. It is found in Colombia and Ecuador.

== Taxonomy and systematics ==
The rufous-fronted wood quail has at various times been proposed or considered as conspecific with chestnut wood quail (Odonophorus hyperythrus), dark-backed wood quail (O. melanonotus), and rufous-breasted wood quail (O. speciosus). O. melanonotus has also been considered a subspecies of O. erythrops, and at least two other variations have been proposed as subspecies. As of 2021, rufous-fronted wood quail and chestnut wood quail are treated as a superspecies.

The rufous-fronted wood quail has two subspecies, the nominate O. e. erythrops and O. e. parambae. To complicate matters, the latter has also been considered to be a separate species.

== Description ==
The rufous-fronted wood quail is 23 to 28 cm (9.1 to 11.0 in) long. Males weigh an estimated 340 g (12 oz) and females an estimated 329 g (11.6 oz). The nominate male has a rufous crown, crest, and face, with a ring of bare purple skin around the eye. The back and rump can be black or olive, with black spots. The breast and belly are dark rufous. The female's face is a darker and duller chestnut and the eye ring is blue-black. The juvenile is similar to the female but differs mostly by having black spots and bars on the belly. O. e. parambae has darker upperparts than the nominate and a white throat.

== Distribution and habitat ==
The nominate subspecies of rufous-fronted wood quail is found in southwestern Ecuador. O. e. parambae is found more widely, on the Pacific slope of western Ecuador and western Colombia and in Colombia's Magdalena Valley. They inhabit primary and secondary humid tropical forest, in Ecuador up to 1,600 m (5,200 ft) but usually only as high as 1,100 m (3,600 ft) in Colombia.

== Behavior ==
=== Feeding ===
The rufous-fronted wood quail's diet has not been studied, but they have been noted coming to grain at lodge feeders.

=== Breeding ===
The rufous-fronted wood quail's breeding season is believed to span from January to May. No other information about its breeding phenology has been published.

=== Vocalization ===
The rufous-fronted wood quail has at least two calls, a "rapidly repeated, ringing duet 'chowita, chowita, chowita'" and "a resonant 'koo-klaw, koo-klaw, koo-klaw'".

== Status ==
The IUCN has assessed the rufous-fronted wood quail as being of Least Concern. The species is found in several protected areas, but outside them "[m]ajor threats include deforestation, and possibly hunting."
