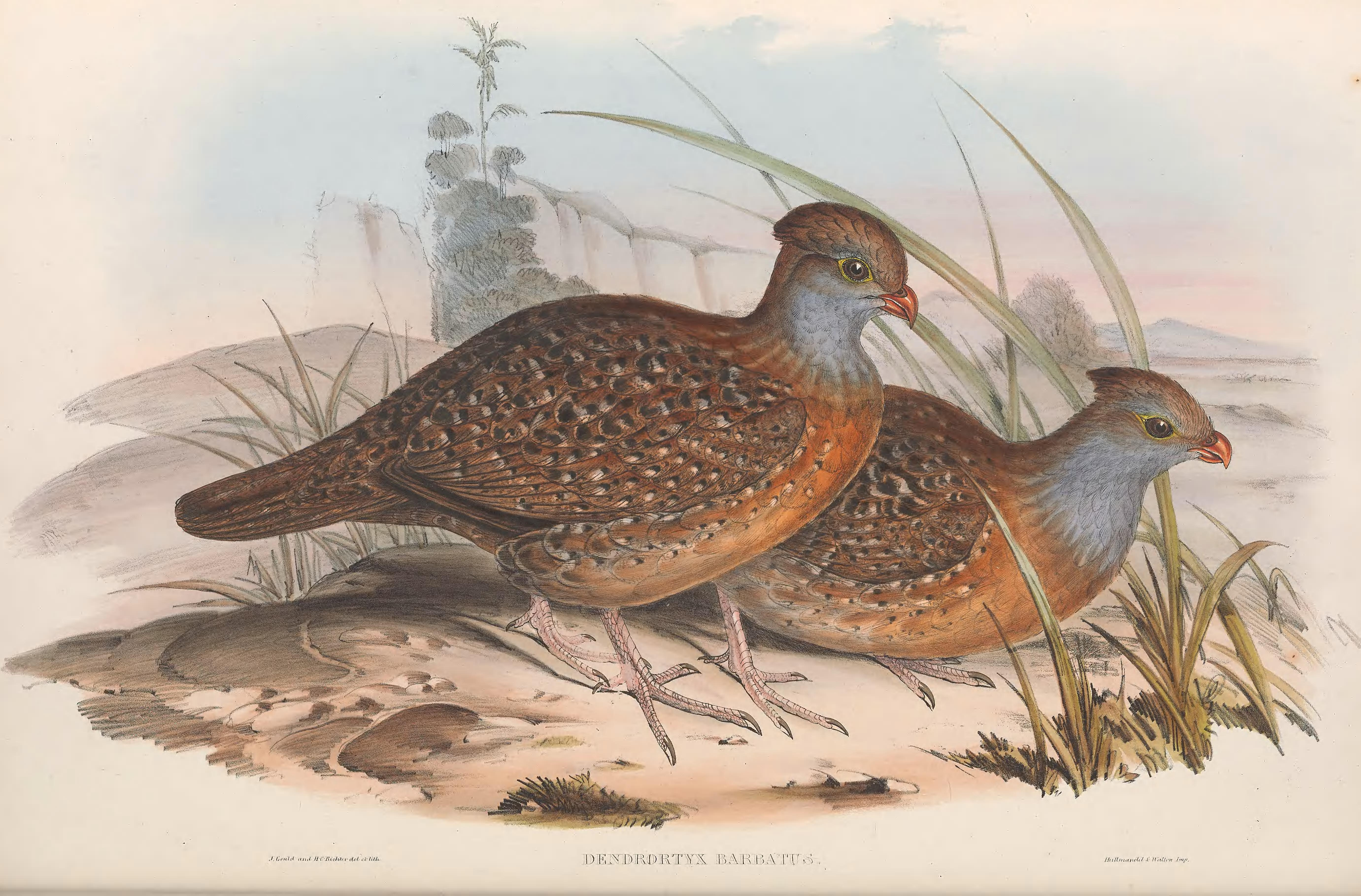
- Illustration by John Gould & H. C. Richter

Conservation status
- Vulnerable (IUCN 3.1)

Scientific classification
- Kingdom: Animalia
- Phylum: Chordata
- Class: Aves
- Order: Galliformes
- Family: Odontophoridae
- Genus: Dendrortyx
- Species: D. barbatus

Binomial name
- Dendrortyx barbatus Gould, 1846

= Bearded wood partridge =

Species of bird

The bearded wood partridge (Dendrortyx barbatus) is a bird species in the family Odontophoridae, the New World quail. It inhabits the Sierra Madre Oriental of Mexico.

== Taxonomy and systematics ==
The bearded wood partridge shares the genus Dendrortyx with two other species, all of which appear to be quite distinct from each other. It is monotypic.

== Description ==
The bearded wood partridge is 33 to 35.5 cm (13.0 to 14.0 in) long and weighs between 405 and 459 g (14.3 and 16.2 oz). Adults have bluish gray cheeks, neck, and upper chest. There is a red patch around the eye. The crown is buff and has a small crest. The nape and chest are cinnamon, with red striations on the nape and sides of the chest. The back is a mix of buff, browns, and grays. Immatures are similar to the adults but their chest is duller and the flanks have brown bars.

== Distribution and habitat ==
The bearded wood partridge has a discontinuous range in the central part of Mexico's Sierra Madre Oriental. The Santo Domingo River in northern Oaxaca and western slope of the Sierra Madre Oriental act as biogeographic barriers. It inhabits the interiors and edges of humid evergreen montane forest and pine-oak forest, both primary and secondary. It is also found in gardens and sometimes in farmland. It is often restricted to narrow riparian zones.

== Behavior ==
=== Feeding ===
The bearded wood partridge forages on the ground. Its diet includes seeds, fruits, buds, tubers, and insects.

=== Breeding ===
Little is known about the bearded wood partridge's breeding phenology. It is reported to breed between April and June. The male makes a dome-shaped nest with a tunnel entrance. The clutch size is usually five.

=== Vocalization ===
The bearded wood-partridge's song is "a series of loud, rollicking whistles, repeated rapidly and often given in duet". The sexes' songs are similar but the female's is quieter. The song is mostly given at dawn and dusk. Groups sing to maintain contact.

== Status ==
The IUCN has assessed the bearded wood partridge as Vulnerable since 2000 after initially rating it Critically Endangered. "[S]urveys have found this species to be more widespread and numerous than previously thought, however it still has a highly fragmented range and small population undergoing a continuous decline."
