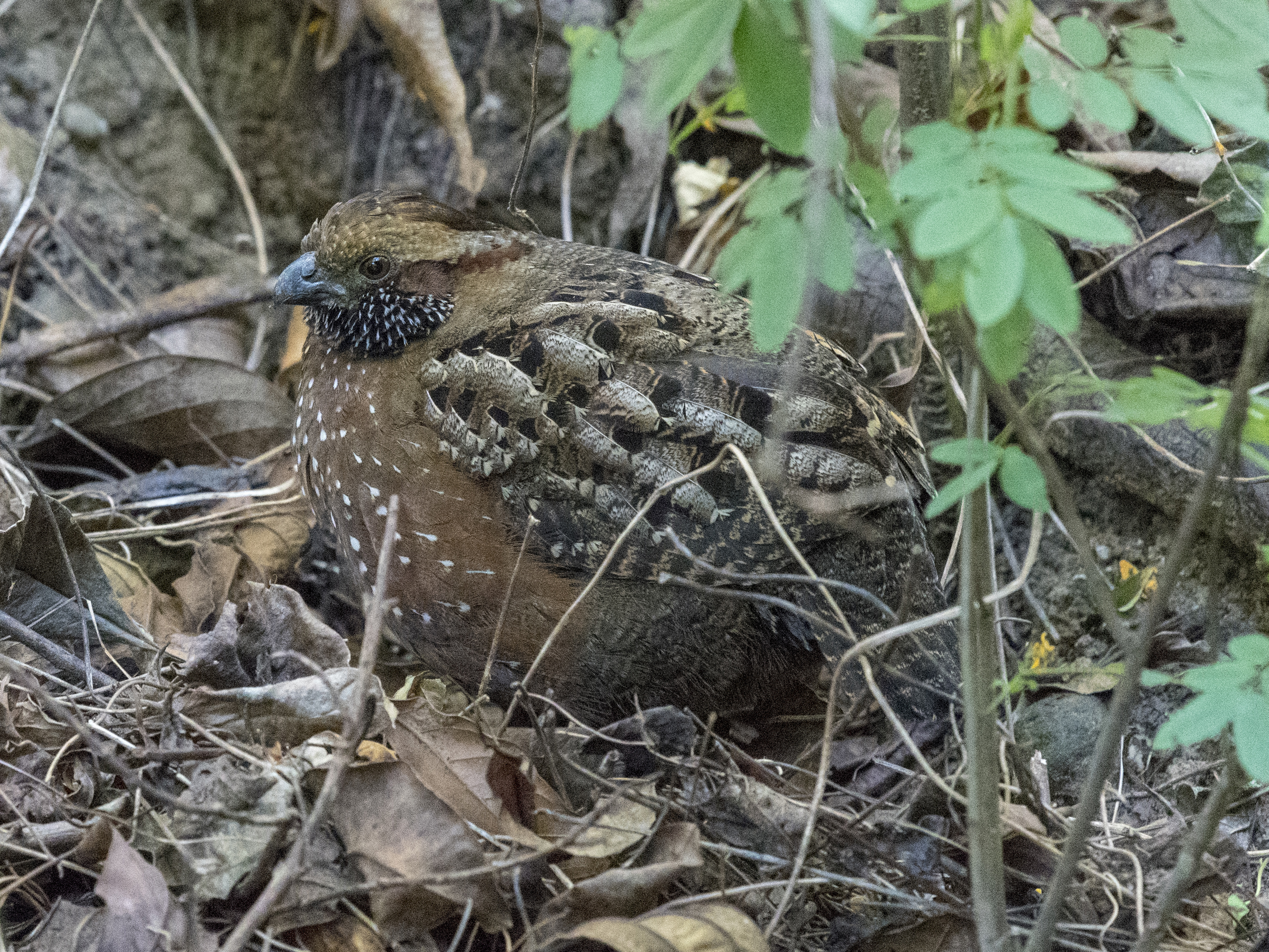

Conservation status
- Least Concern (IUCN 3.1)

Scientific classification
- Kingdom: Animalia
- Phylum: Chordata
- Class: Aves
- Order: Galliformes
- Family: Odontophoridae
- Genus: Odontophorus
- Species: O. guttatus

Binomial name
- Odontophorus guttatus (Gould, 1838)

= Spotted wood quail =

Species of bird

The spotted wood quail (Odontophorus guttatus) is a small ground-dwelling bird in the New World quail family. It is a resident breeder in the mountains of Central America from southern Mexico to western Panama.

It occurs in highlands from 1000 m or higher up to the timberline, usually in dense understory thickets or bamboos. The nest, as with several other wood-quails remains undescribed, but the eggs are known to be creamy-white with brown spots.

The spotted wood quail is 25 cm long and weighs 300 g. It has an orange crest which is raised when it is excited. The upperparts are dark brown with black and rufous flecking. The underparts are normally olive brown, but there is a colour morph with rufous underparts. In both cases, the underparts are boldly spotted with white. The forehead is dark brown and the cheeks and throat are black streaked with white.

The sexes are similar, but the male averages slightly larger and the female has a duller crest. Immature birds have smaller, more buff-tinted spotting, and the throat is dusky rather than black. There are no subspecies.

The advertising call of the spotted wood quail, actually a duet, is a clear whistled coowit CAWwit coowit COO, and the contact calls are clear chirps and peeps.

Spotted wood quails are found in groups of 4 to 10; they forage on the ground, scratching at the soil for seeds, fallen fruit and insects. This is a shy and wary species, which will normally make its escape on foot, but if startled it will explode into a short fast flight into cover. The best chance of seeing this species is at dawn, when it may feed at the side of a road or on a forest track.

This species is reported as locally common in suitable habitat in Costa Rica and Panama, but has been adversely impacted in much of its range by rampant deforestation.
