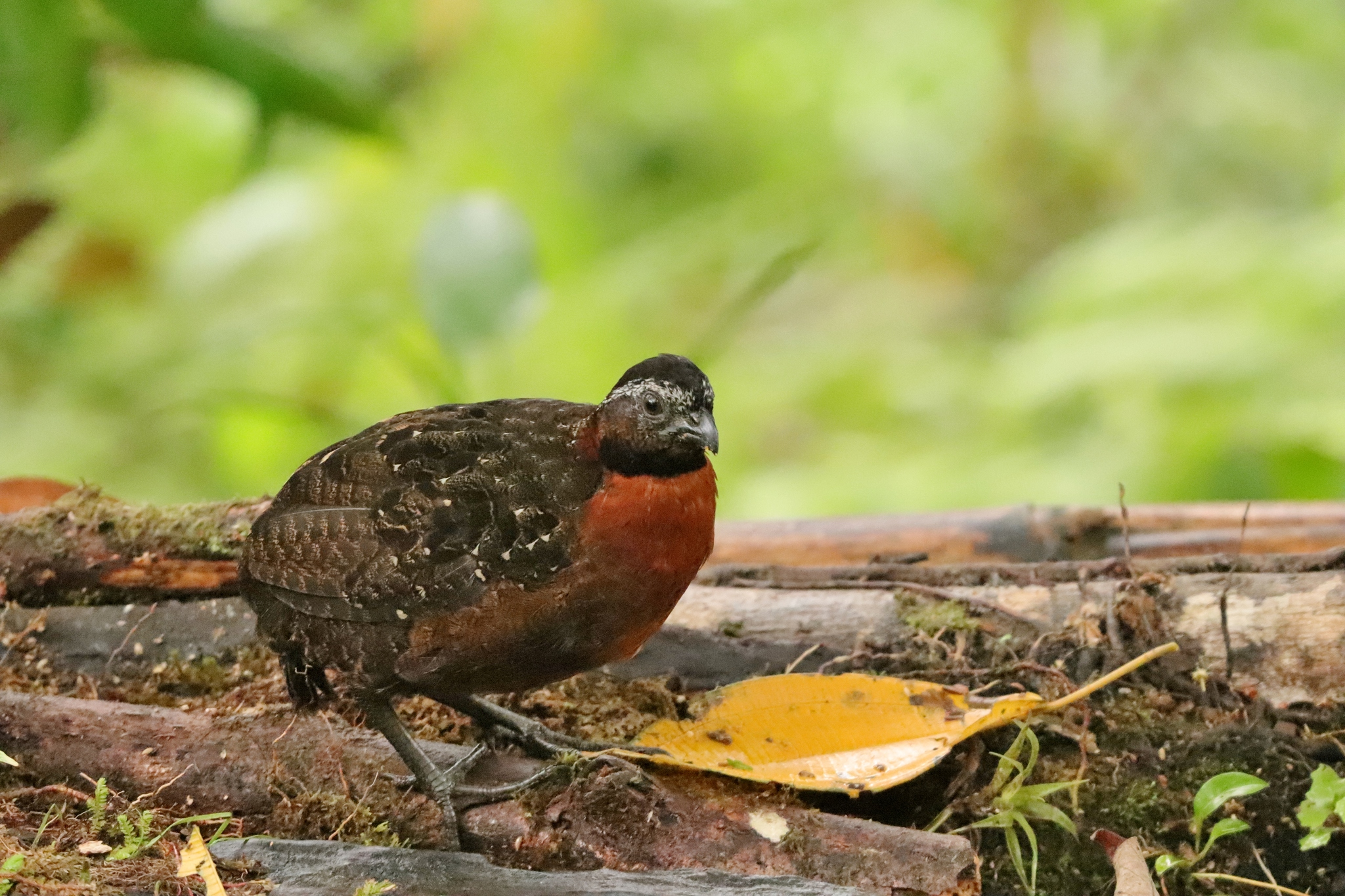

Conservation status
- Least Concern (IUCN 3.1)

Scientific classification
- Kingdom: Animalia
- Phylum: Chordata
- Class: Aves
- Order: Galliformes
- Family: Odontophoridae
- Genus: Odontophorus
- Species: O. speciosus

Binomial name
- Odontophorus speciosus Tschudi, 1843

= Rufous-breasted wood quail =

Species of bird

The rufous-breasted wood quail (Odontophorus speciosus) is a species of bird in the family Odontophoridae. It is found in Bolivia, Ecuador, and Peru primarily on the east side of the Andes between 800 and 2000m in elevation (higher in Peru).

Its natural habitat is subtropical or tropical moist montane forests.

It has been listed as least concern.

== Feeding ==
The Rufous-breasted wood quail eats insects and nuts especially in summer, as well as plants. Unlike many other bird species, they require a high protein diet.

== Subspecies ==
- O. s. soderstromii Lönnberg & Rendahl, 1922 – extreme S Colombia (SE Nariño) and E & S Ecuador.
- O. s. speciosus Tschudi, 1843 – N & C Peru (Amazonas S to Ayacucho).
- O. s. loricatus Todd, 1932 – SE Peru (Cuzco) to Bolivia (E to Santa Cruz).
