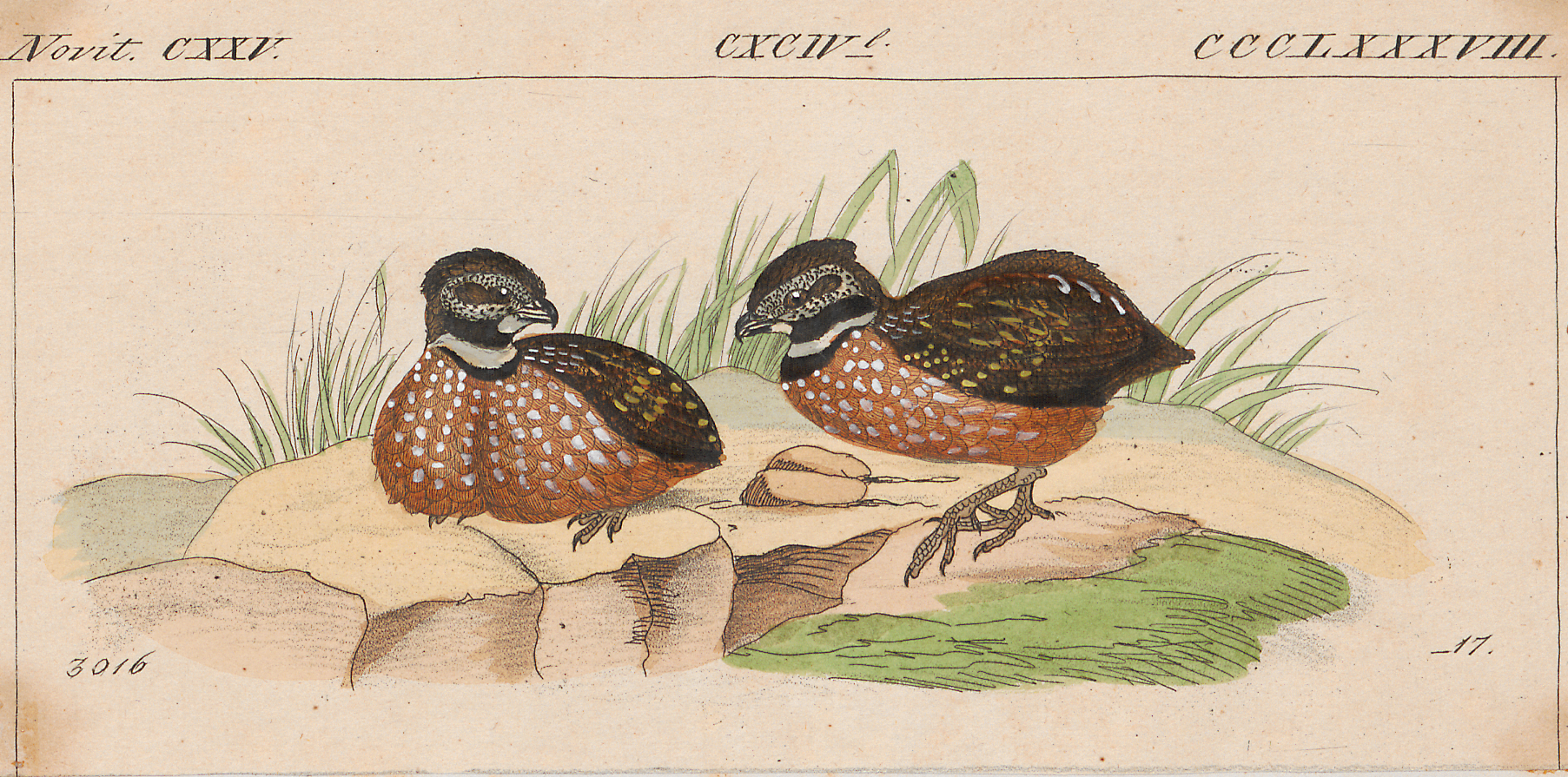

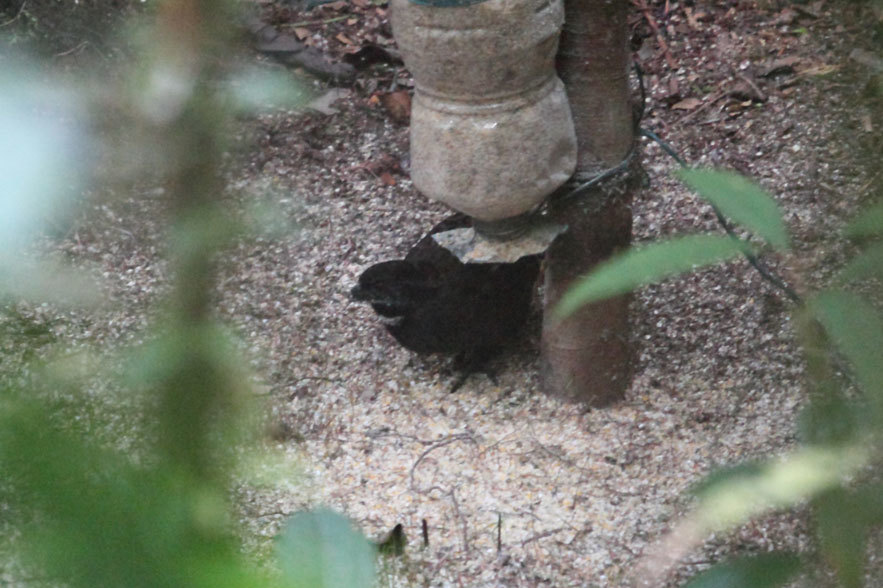

Conservation status
- Vulnerable (IUCN 3.1)

Scientific classification
- Kingdom: Animalia
- Phylum: Chordata
- Class: Aves
- Order: Galliformes
- Family: Odontophoridae
- Genus: Odontophorus
- Species: O. strophium

Binomial name
- Odontophorus strophium (Gould, 1844)

= Gorgeted wood quail =

Species of bird

The rare gorgeted wood quail (Odontophorus strophium) is a small ground-dwelling bird. This tiny member of the New World quail family has been found in the larger oak forest remnants in the eastern Cordillera (Serrania de Yariguies and NorAndino Oak Forest Corridor) section of Colombia.

Its natural habitat is humid subtropical and temperate forests that have mainly oak and laurel trees. The bird has only been sighted between the altitudes of 1,750–2,050 m (5,740–6,730 ft), but it is believed that this tiny quail may have an elevational range of 1,500–2,500 m (4,920–8,200 ft). It is probably dependent on primary forest for a part of its life-cycle, yet it has also been sited in degraded habitats and secondary forest.

It forages for fruit, seeds and arthropods. The bird's breeding season seems to coincide with peaks in annual rainfall in March–May and September–November.

It was formerly classified as Critically Endangered by the IUCN. But new research has shown it to be not as rare as it was believed. Consequently, it is downlisted to Endangered status in 2008, and further improved to Vulnerable from 2018 onwards.

== Feeding ==
The Gorgeted quail eats insects and nuts especially in summer, as well as plants. Unlike many other bird species, they require a high protein diet.
