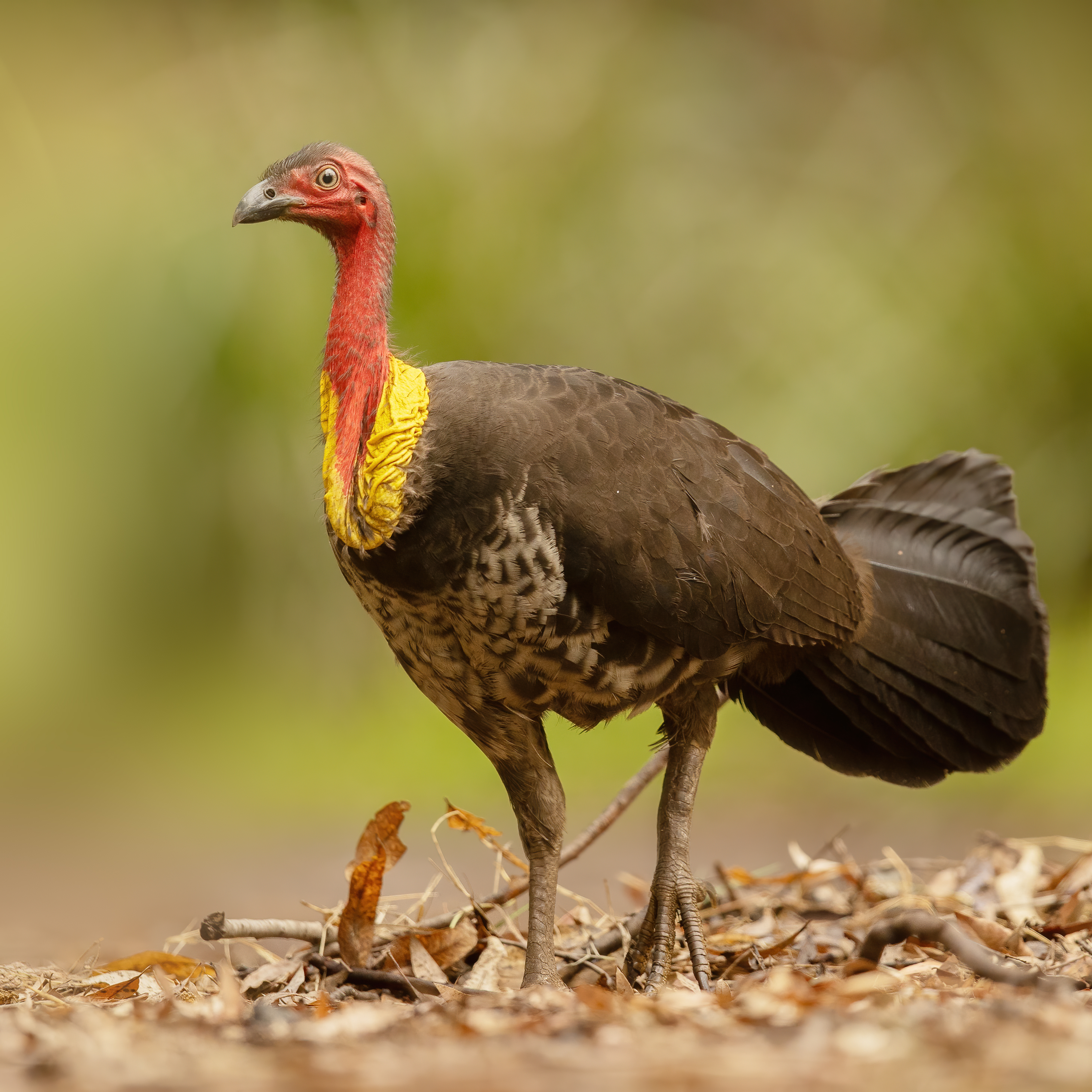
- Male
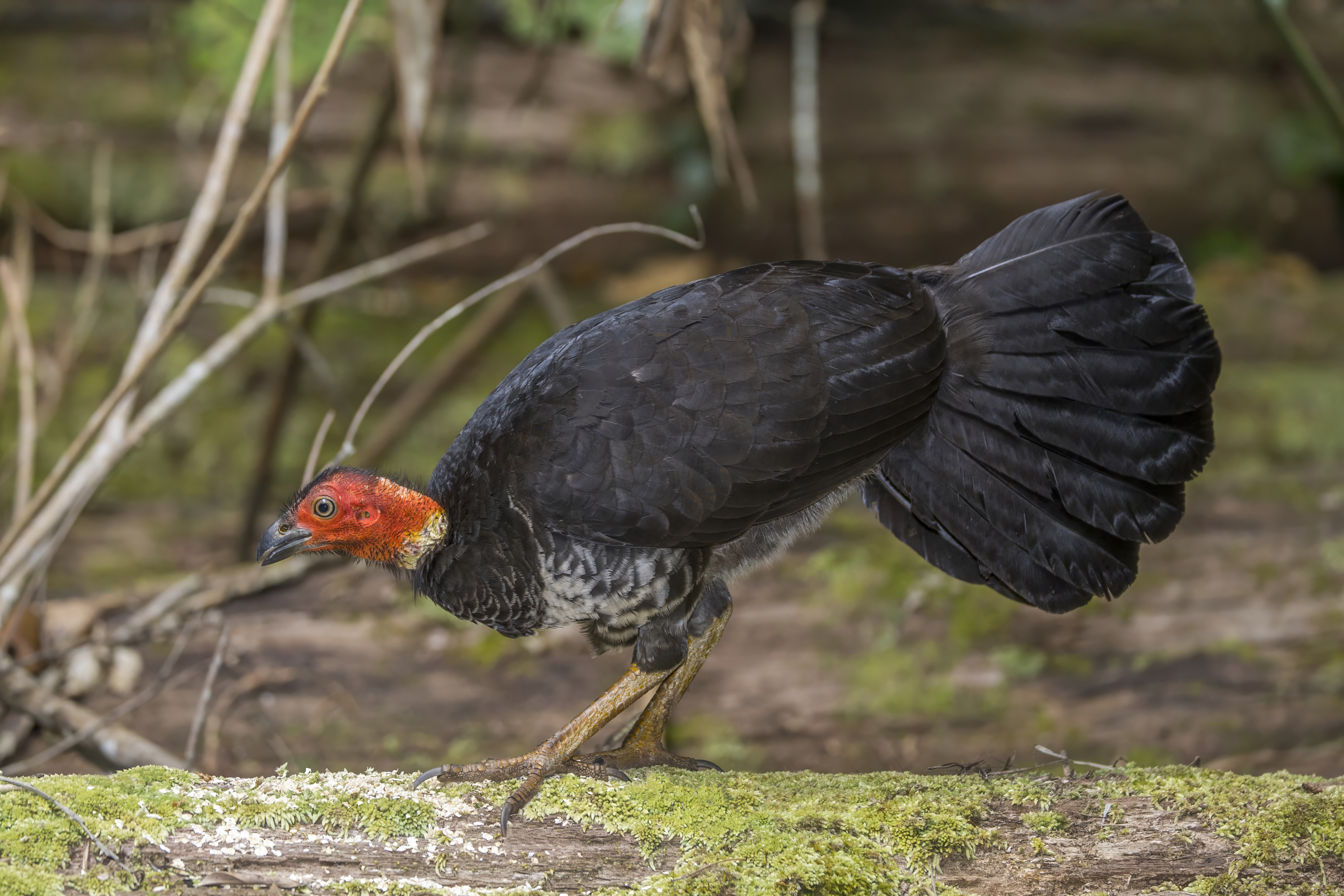
- Female

Conservation status
- Least Concern (IUCN 3.1)

Scientific classification
- Kingdom: Animalia
- Phylum: Chordata
- Class: Aves
- Order: Galliformes
- Family: Megapodiidae
- Genus: Alectura; Latham, 1824
- Species: A. lathami

Binomial name
- Alectura lathami Gray, J.E., 1831

Subspecies
- A. l. purpureicollis (Le Souef, 1898) purple-wattled brushturkey; A. l. lathami (J.E. Gray, 1831) Australian brushturkey
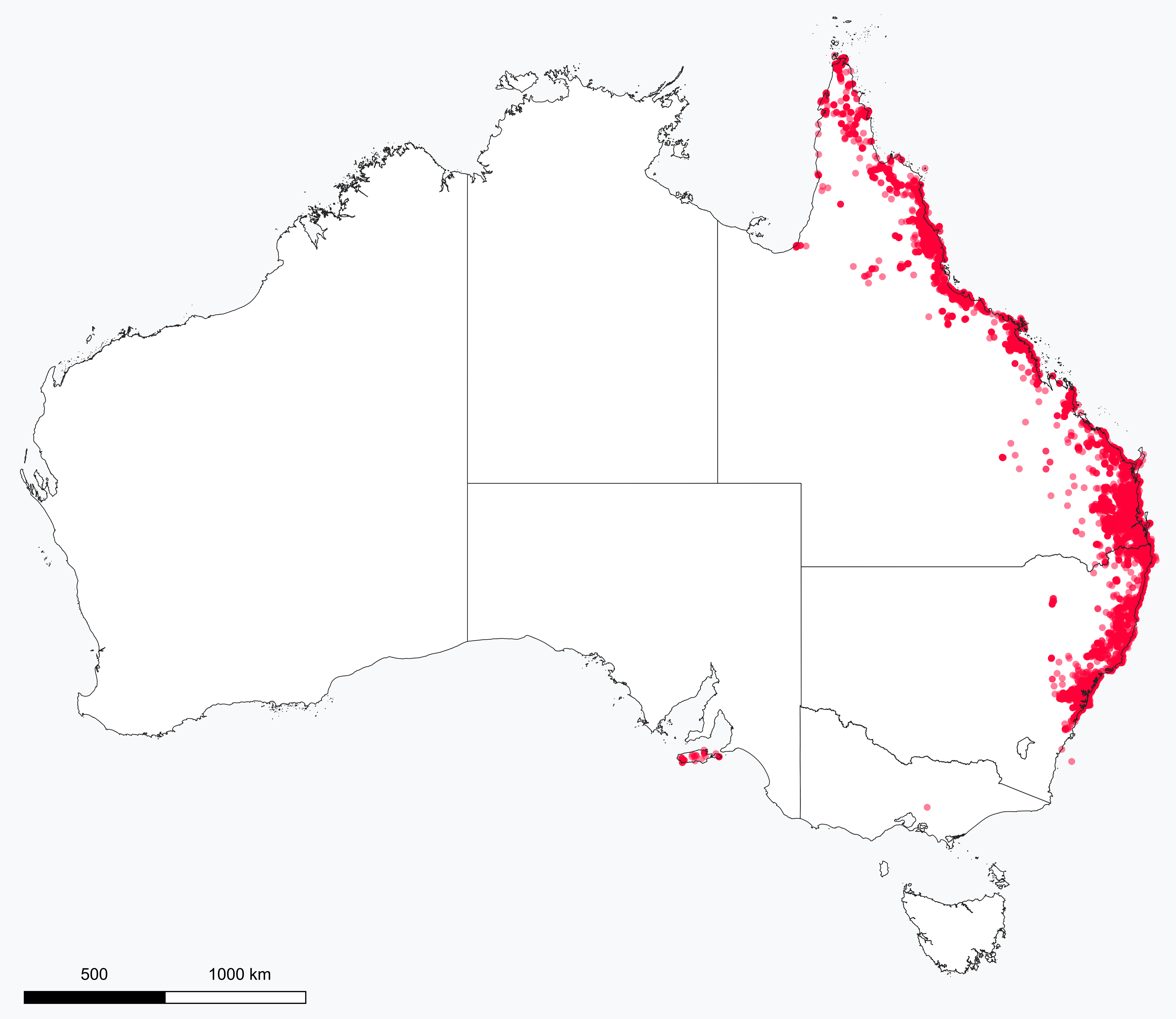
- Species distribution

= Australian brushturkey =

Species of bird

The Australian brushturkey, Australian brush-turkey, or gweela (Alectura lathami), also commonly called the bush turkey, scrub turkey, or just brushturkey, is a large mound-building bird of the family Megapodiidae. It is found in eastern Australia, ranging from Far North Queensland to the south coast of New South Wales, and has also been introduced to Kangaroo Island in South Australia. It is the largest living member of the Megapodiidae and one of three species native to Australia.

Despite its name and superficial resemblance to other birds, the Australian brushturkey is not closely related to the American turkey or the Australian bustard (which is also known locally as the bush turkey in central Australia). Its closest relatives are the wattled brushturkey, Waigeo brushturkey, and malleefowl.

== Distribution ==
The range of the Australian brushturkey extends from the top of Cape York to approximately the area around Wollongong.

== Habitat ==
The Australian brushturkey inhabits rainforests and wet sclerophyll forests, as well as drier scrubs and open areas. It lives in both mountainous and lowland areas. In the northern part of its range, the Australian brushturkey is most common at higher altitudes, but individuals move to the lowland areas in winter. In the south, it is common in both mountain and lowland regions.

Brushturkeys are now common in urban environments and can be found in backyards in both Brisbane and Sydney.

== Description ==
The Australian brushturkey is a large bird with black feathers and a red head. Its total length is about 60–75 cm (23.5–29.5 in) and a wingspan of about 85 cm (33 in). The subspecies A. l. purpureicollis from the northern Cape York Peninsula is smaller than the more widespread nominate subspecies. It has a prominent, fan-like tail flattened sideways, and its plumage is mainly blackish, but with a bare red head, and a yellow (in the nominate subspecies) or purple wattle (in A. l. purpureicollis).

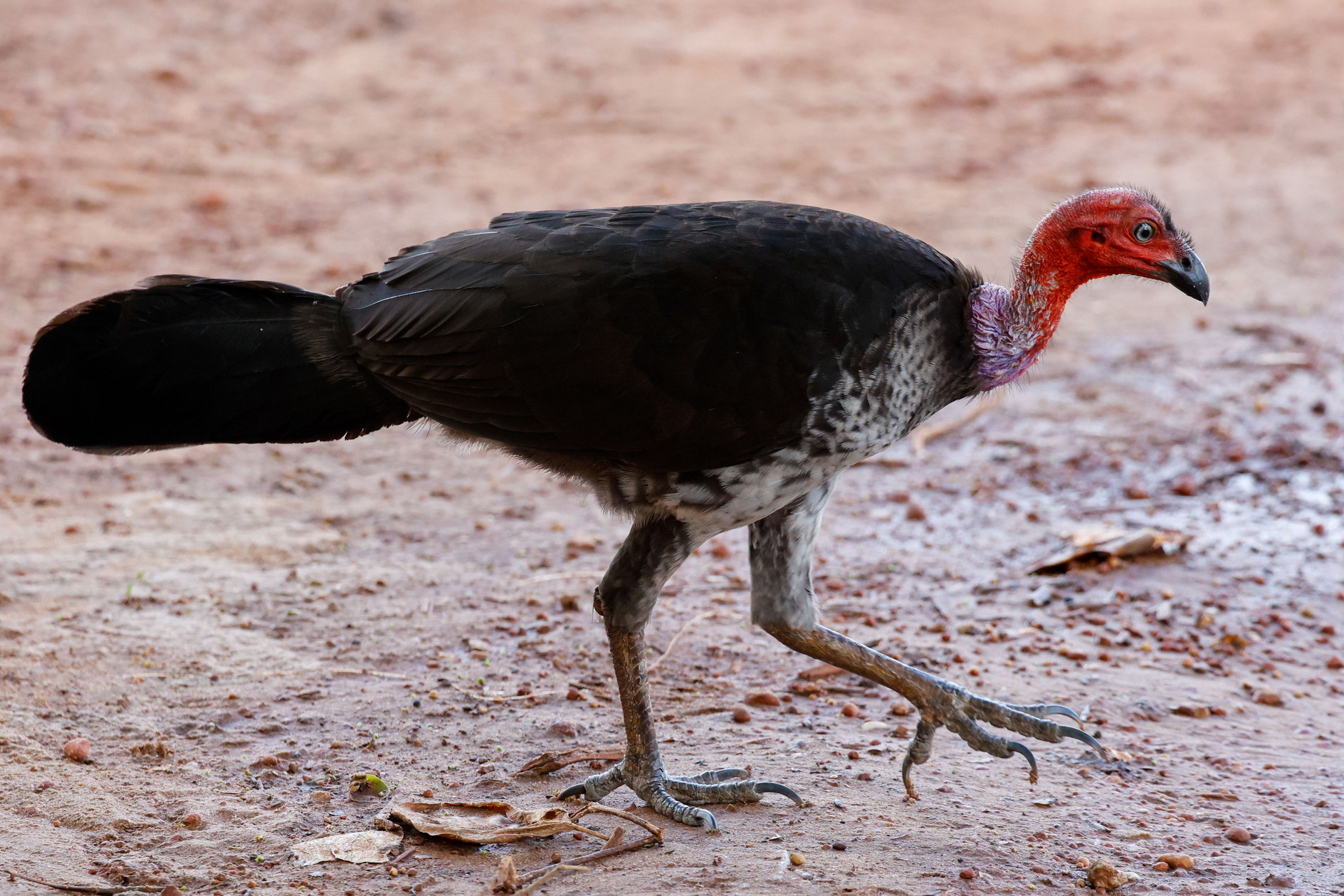
A. l. purpureicollis

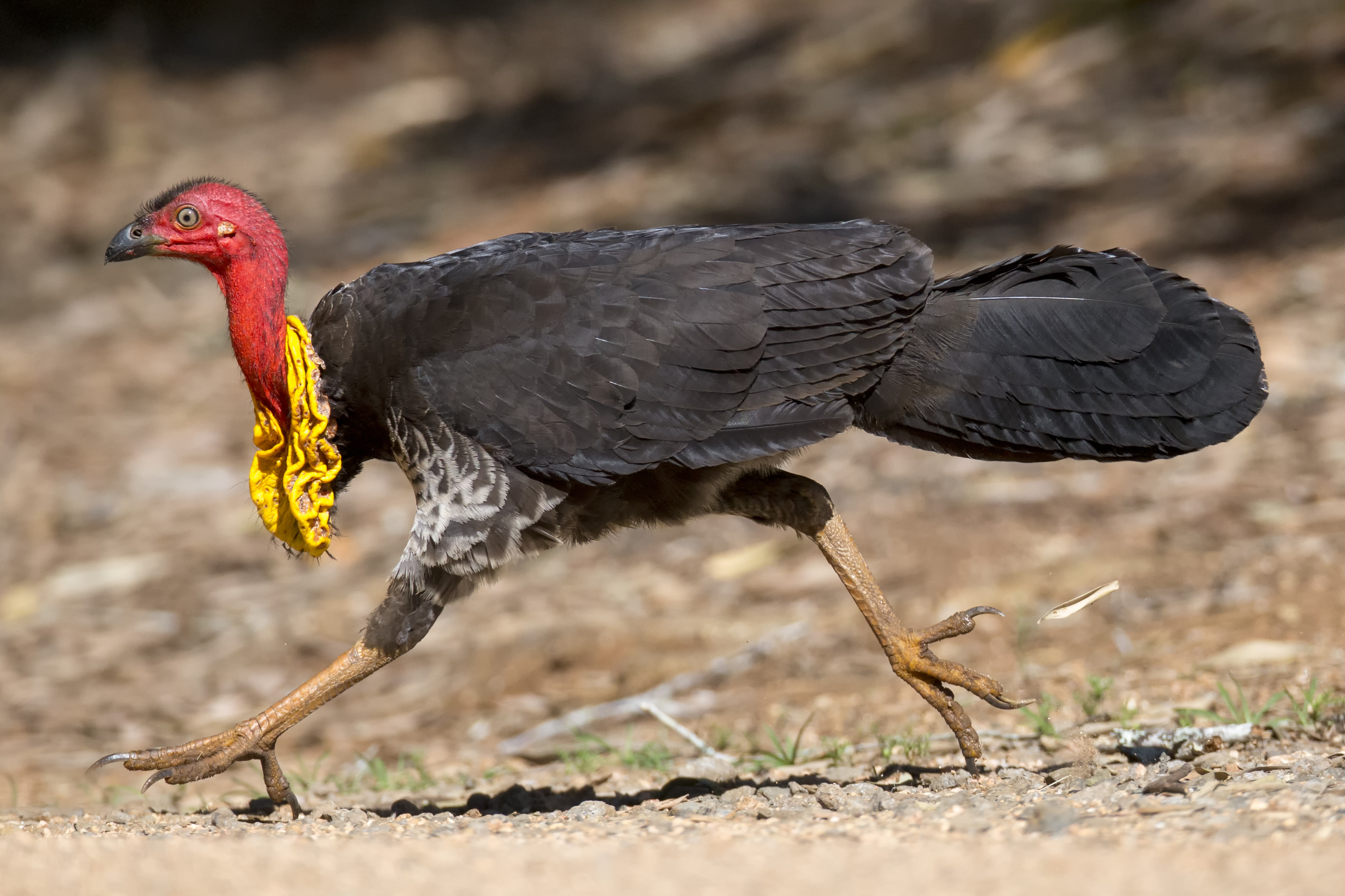
A. l. lathami

The males' wattles become much larger during breeding season, often swinging from side to side as they run. The males' heads and wattles also become much brighter during the breeding and nesting season. The underside of the body is sprinkled with white feathers, more pronounced in older birds. The brushturkey is a clumsy flyer and cannot fly long distances, only taking to the air when threatened by predators or to roost in trees at night and during the heat of the day.

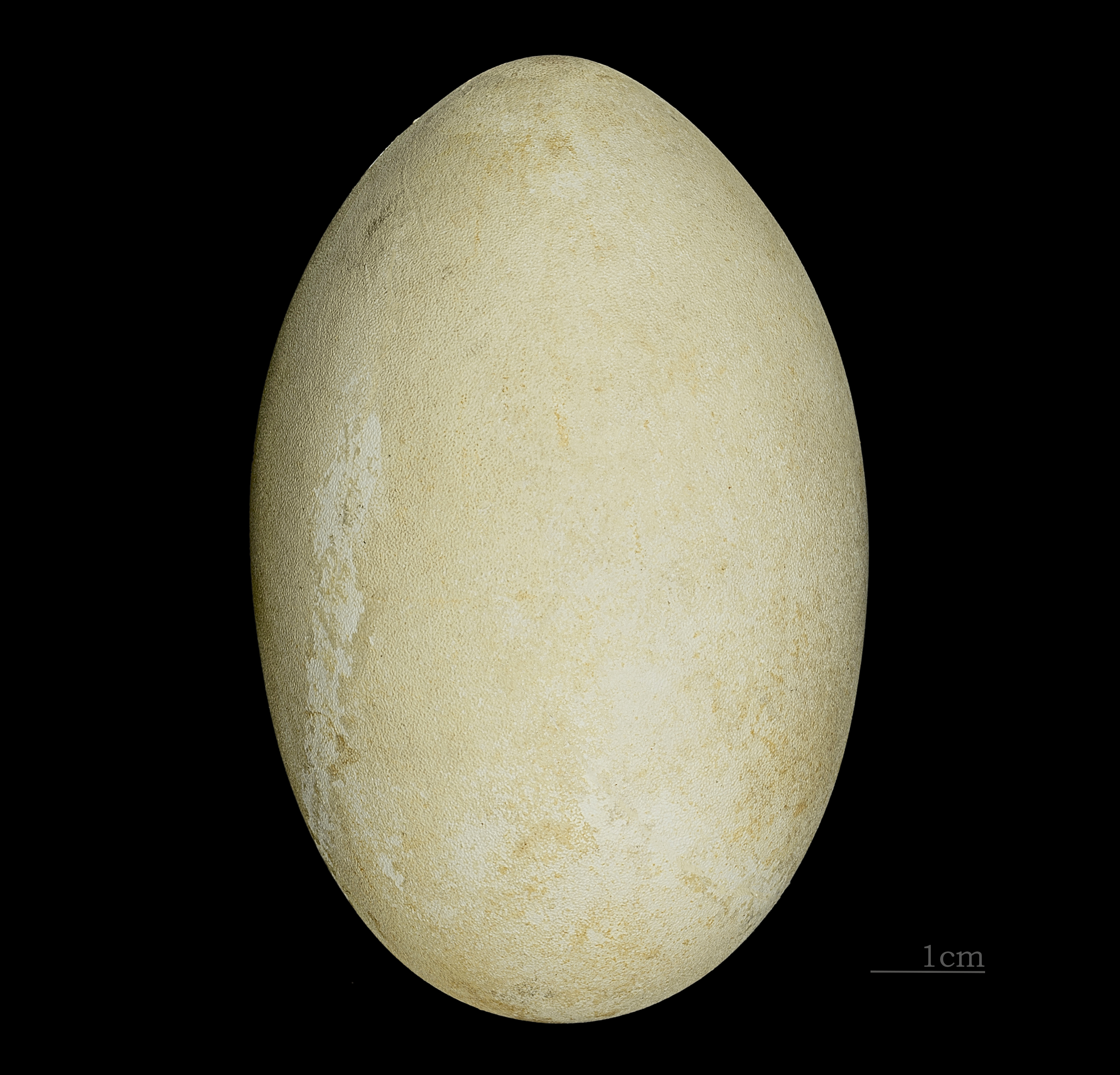
Egg

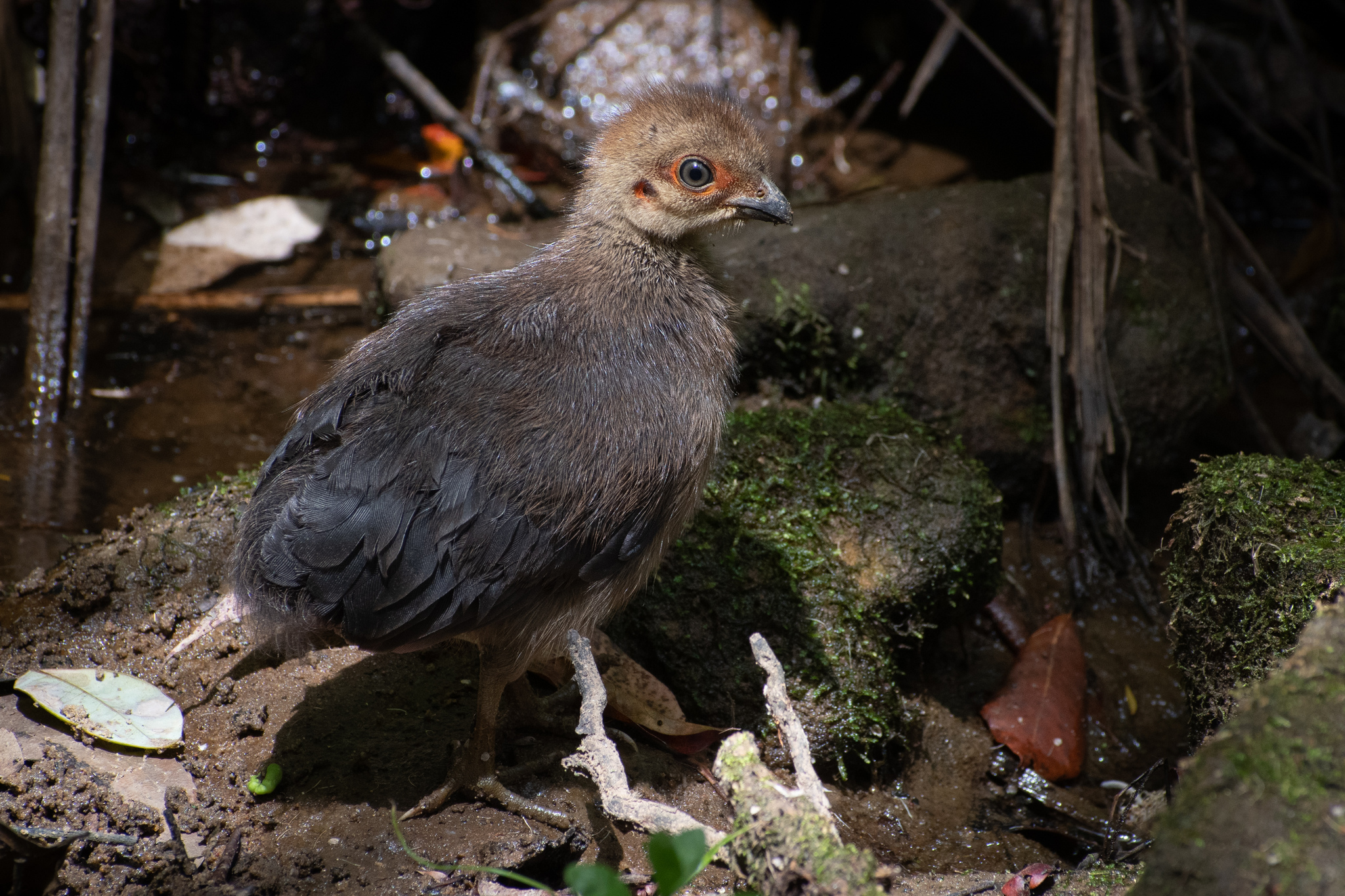
Chick

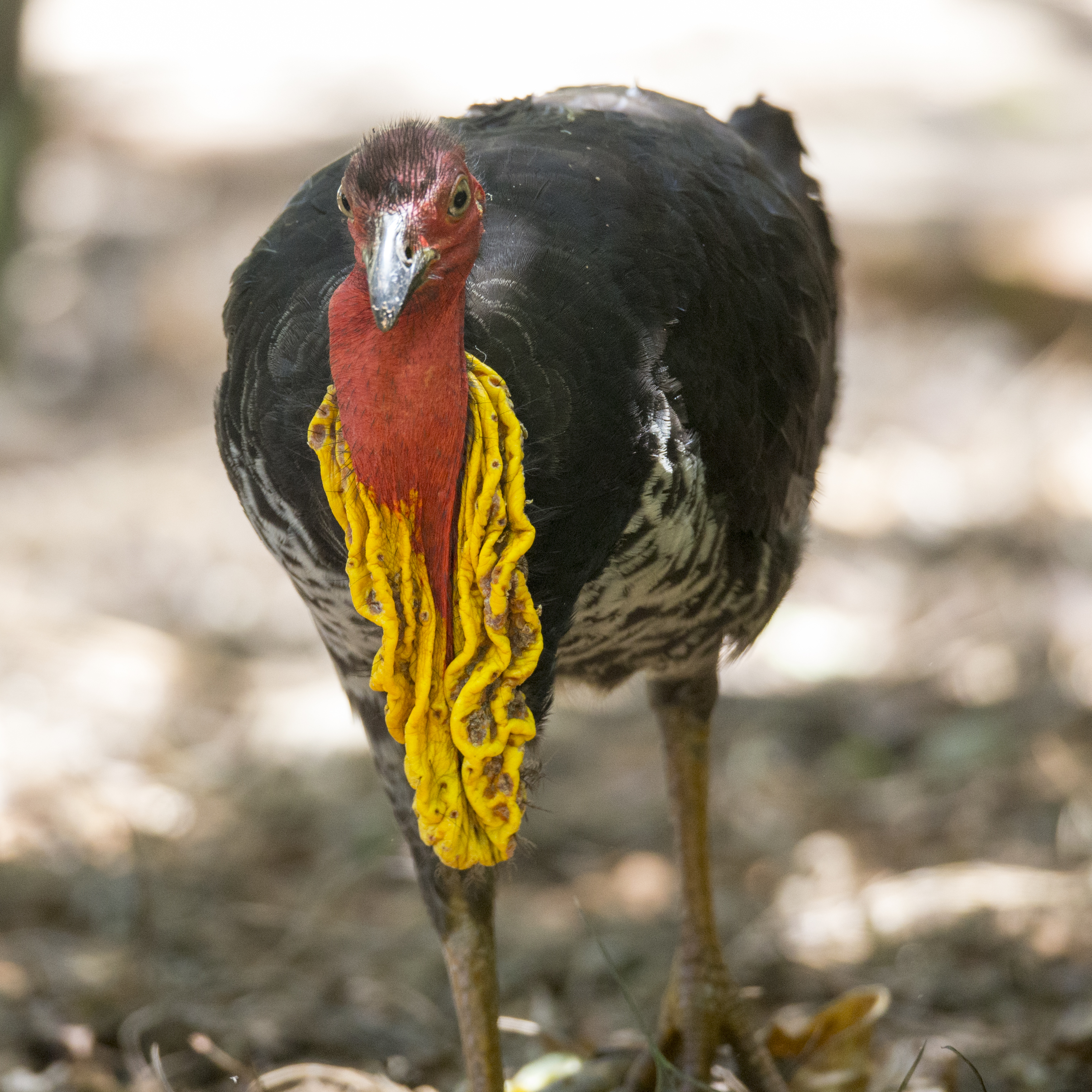
Adult male

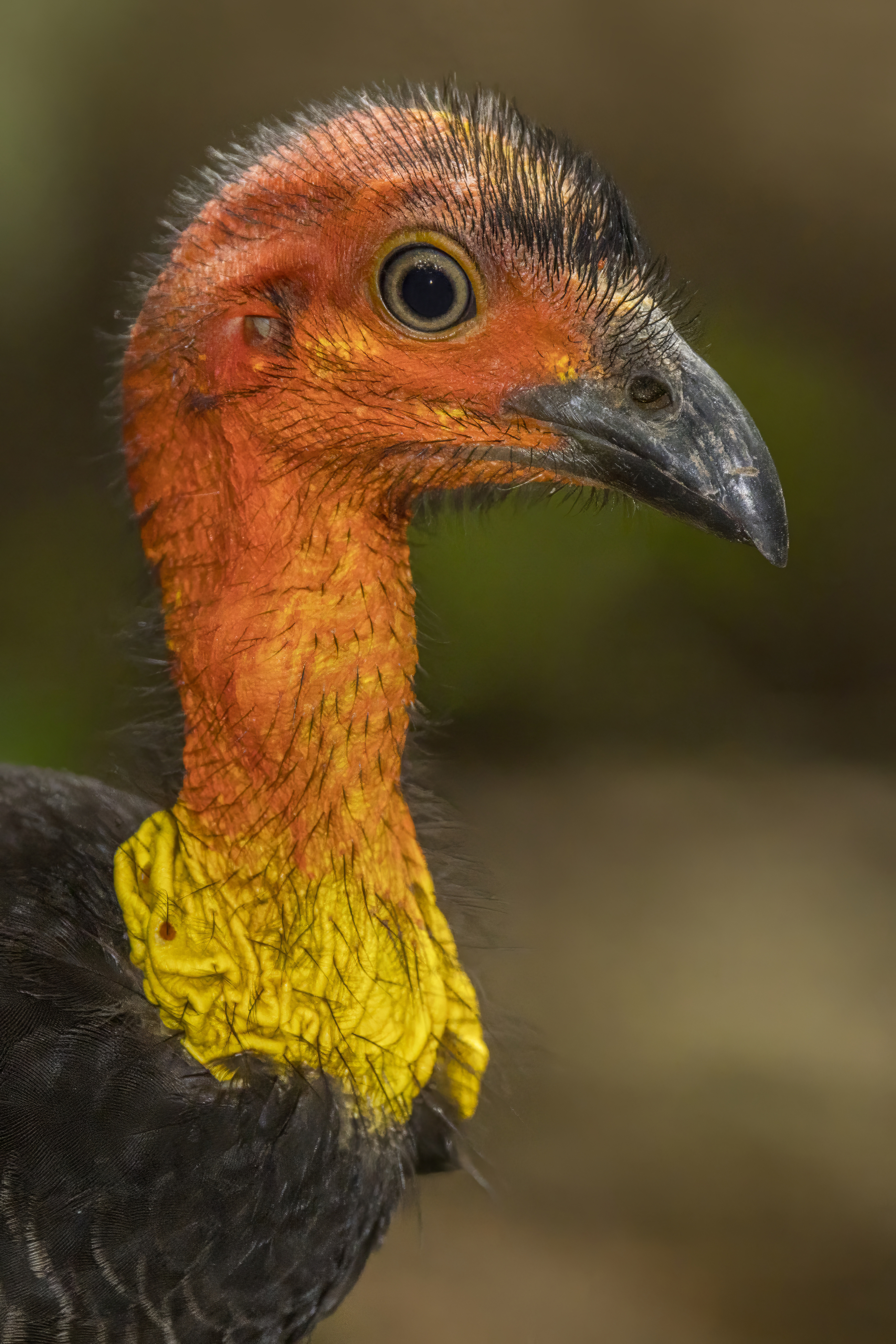
Adult female

== Biology ==
=== Reproduction ===
Australian brushturkey building his mound

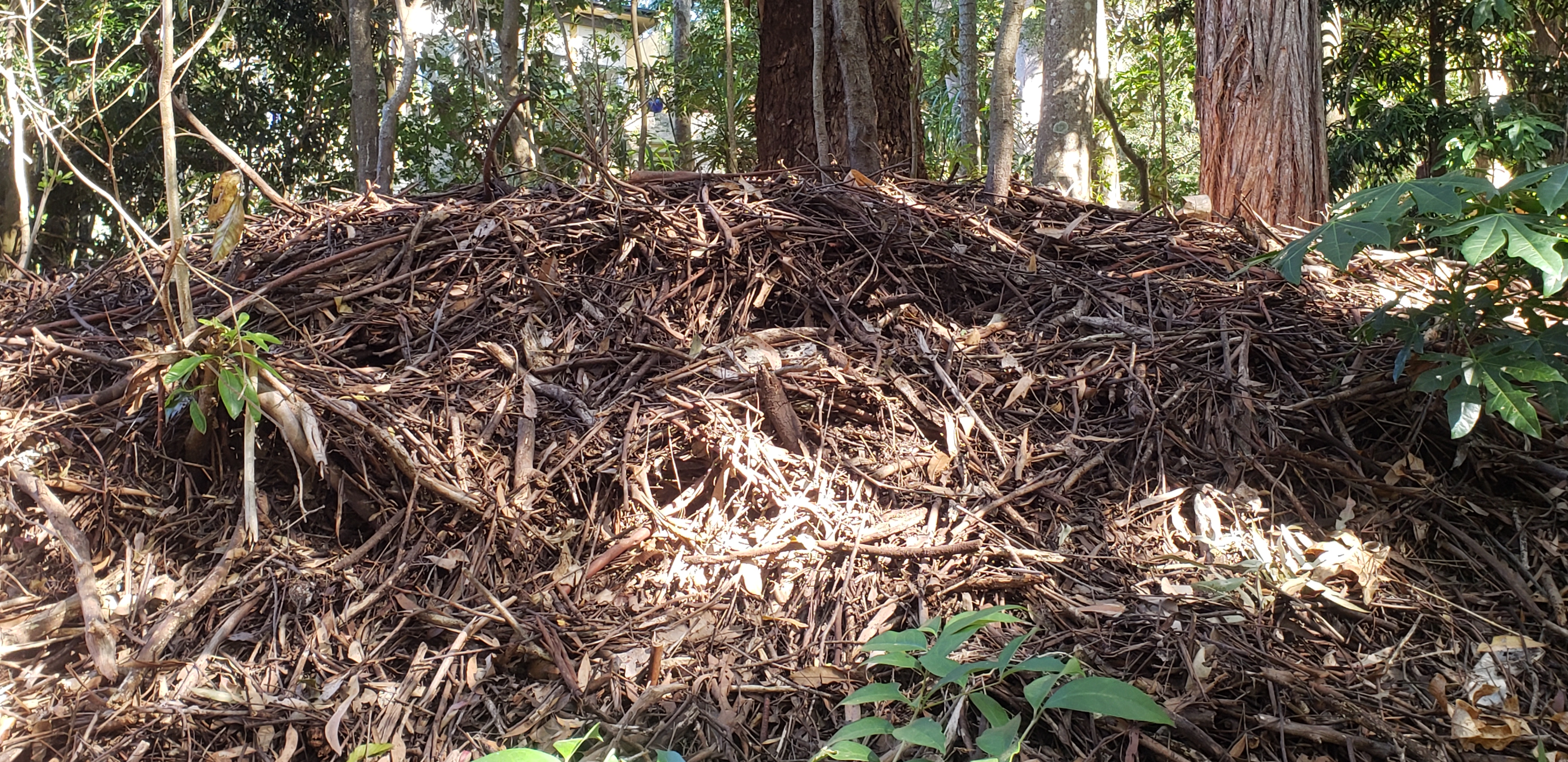
Leaf litter nest of an Australian brushturkey in northern Sydney

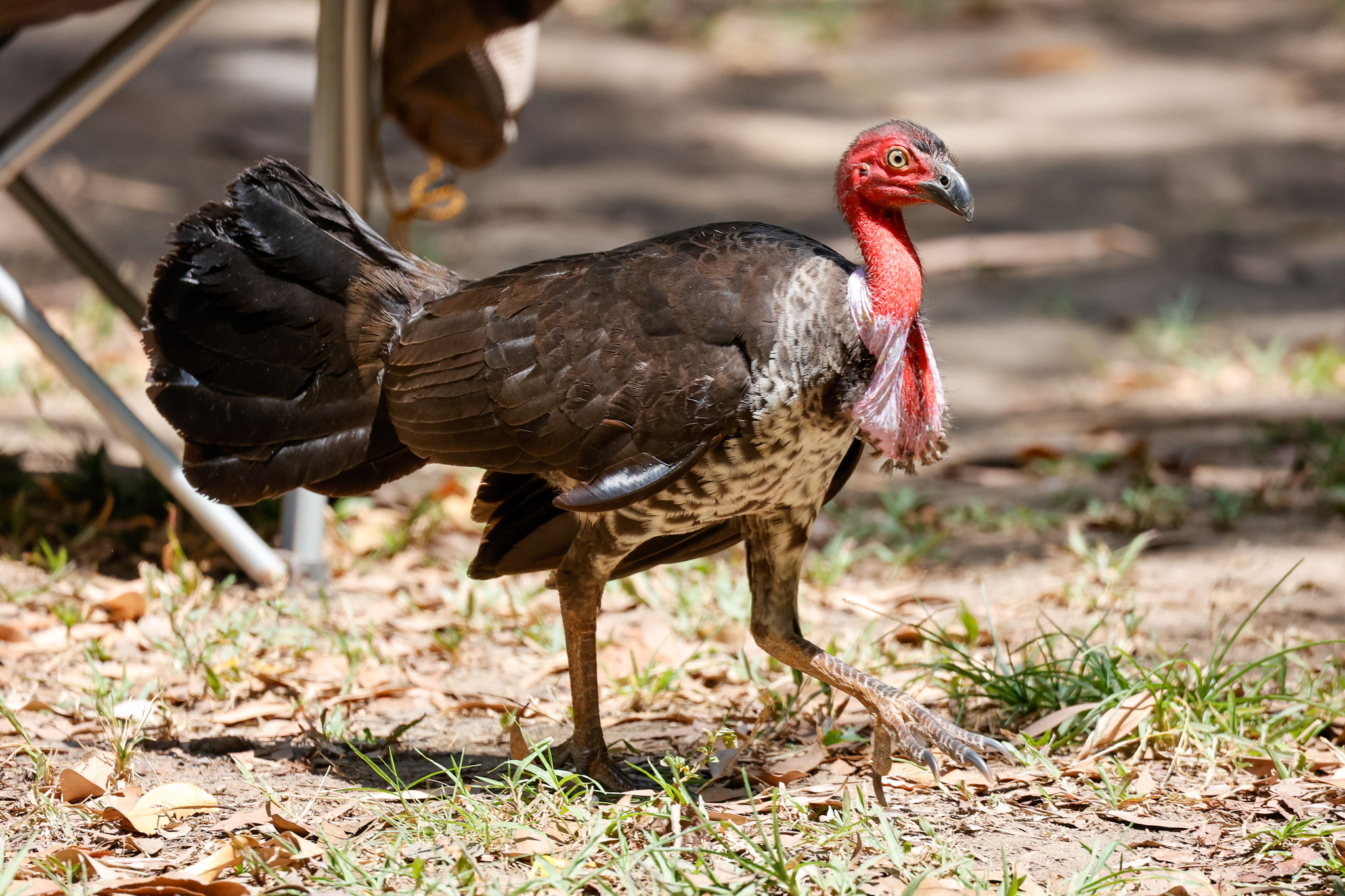
A. l. purpureicollis male showing the wattle

Australian brushturkeys build large nests on the ground made of leaves, other compostable material, and earth, 1 to 1.5 metres (3.3 to 4.9 ft) high and up to 4 m (13 ft) across. Mound-building is done by a dominant male, and visited by a succession of local females, for mating and egg-laying. The male works tirelessly, collecting material from all around, and also diligently repelling rival males, which are keen to usurp his position. The effort involved eventually wears him down, and he will ultimately be defeated by a new king. The eggs are very large (90 × 45 mm), and the young are fully fledged on hatching. They can fly within hours, as soon as the feathers are dry. The eggs are hatched by the heat of the composting mound, the temperature of which is regulated by adding or removing material to maintain the temperature in the 33–35 °C (91–95 °F) incubation temperature range. The Australian brushturkey checks the temperature by sticking its beak into the mound.

As with some reptiles, incubation temperature affects the sex ratio of chicks, but the mechanism is different between reptiles and these birds, with reptiles exhibiting temperature-dependent sex determination, and megapodes exhibiting temperature-dependent embryo mortality. The sex ratio in brushturkeys is equal at incubation temperatures of 34 °C, but results in more males when cooler and more females when warmer. Whether the parents use this to manipulate the sex of their offspring by, for instance, selecting the nesting site accordingly, is unclear. Warmer incubation also results in heavier, fitter chicks, but how this is linked to sex is also unknown.

The same nesting site is frequently used year after year, with the old nests being added to each breeding season. The average clutch of eggs is between 16 and 24 large white eggs, which are laid September to March. Sometimes, up to 50 eggs laid by several females may be found in a single mound. The eggs are placed in a circle roughly 60–80 cm (23.5–31.5 in) down, 20–30 cm (8–12 in) apart, always with the large end up. The newly hatched young dig themselves out of the mound and then have to care for themselves.

=== Predators and human interactions ===
Brushturkey eggs are a favourite food of goannas, snakes, dingoes and dogs, though brushturkeys were also a staple of Aboriginal Australians. Often, goannas exhibit wounds on their tails from having been pecked by brushturkeys that ferociously chase them away from their nests. Chicks are left to fend for themselves from their hatching, so they have a high death rate.

In situations where they come into contact with humans, such as picnic areas in national parks and suburban gardens, brushturkeys exhibit little fear and often boldly attempt to steal food from tables and raid compost bins. Brushturkeys in more urbanised areas show reduced fear compared to birds in national parks. They nest in suburban gardens, and in search of material for their nests remove enormous amounts of mulch.

== Population ==
Brushturkeys are fairly common presently, but in the 1930s, the bird was supposed to be approaching extinction.

== Human interaction ==
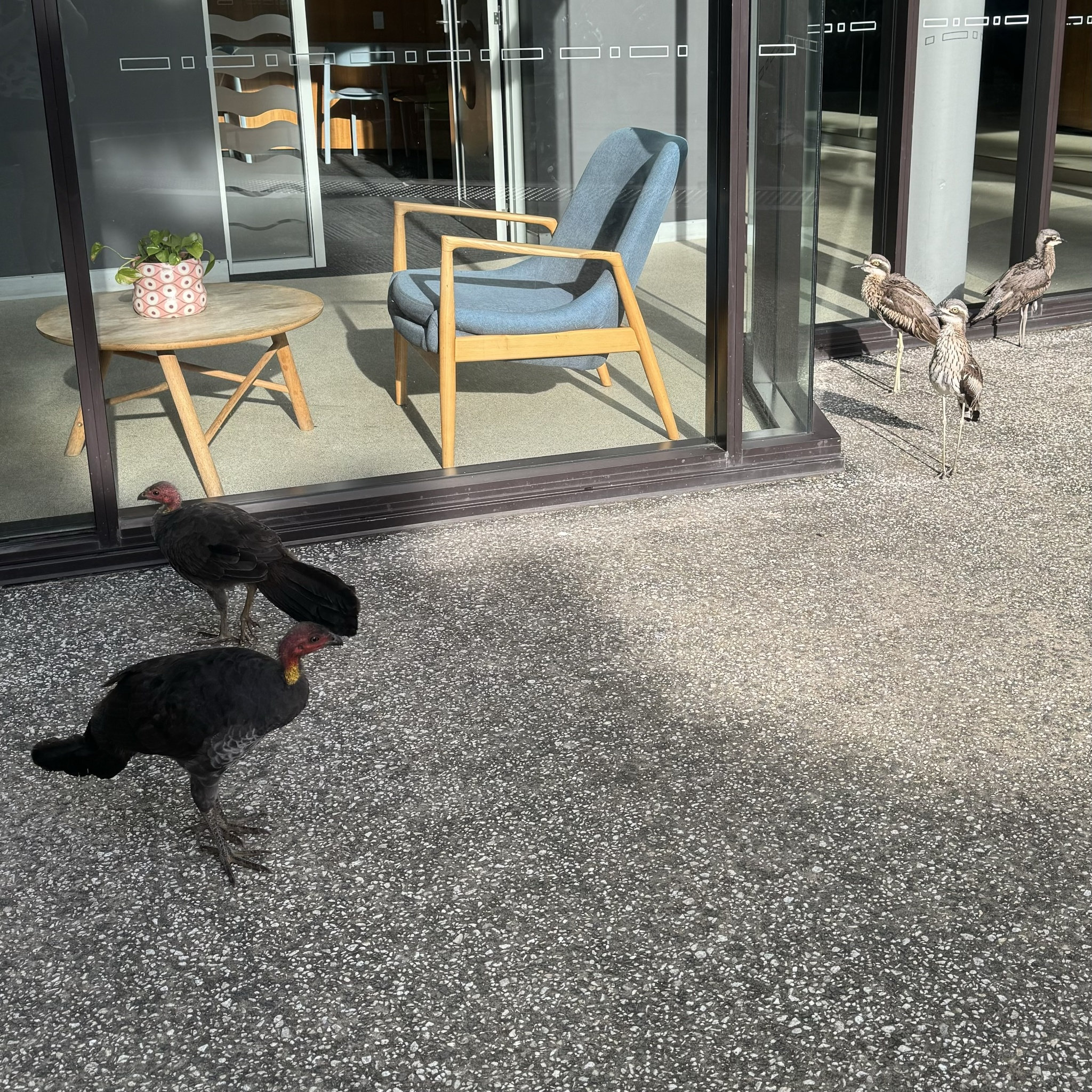
With bush stone-curlews, standing outside an apartment in Brisbane

The Australian brushturkey can damage gardens when raking up the ground looking for food. It can also cause extensive damage to food crops. The New South Wales Department of Environment, Climate Change, and Water provides hints for living with brushturkeys in urban environments.

They are sometimes hunted for food, including as part of the diet of Aboriginal Australians. Their eggs, which weigh on average 180 g (6.3 oz), are also sometimes eaten.

The Australian brushturkey is fully protected in Queensland. Under the Nature Conservation Act 1992 it is an offence to harm brush turkeys. A class 1 offence incurs 3000 penalty units ($483,900) or two years imprisonment. A class 4 offence incurs 100 penalty units ($16,130).

In New South Wales, shooting a brush turkey has resulted in fines of up to A$22,000, under the Biodiversity Conservation Act.

In urban areas, the Australian brushturkey scavenges food waste, including rubbish from bins and discarded food scraps, reflecting its opportunistic feeding behaviour and its expansion into suburban and city areas.

== Gallery ==
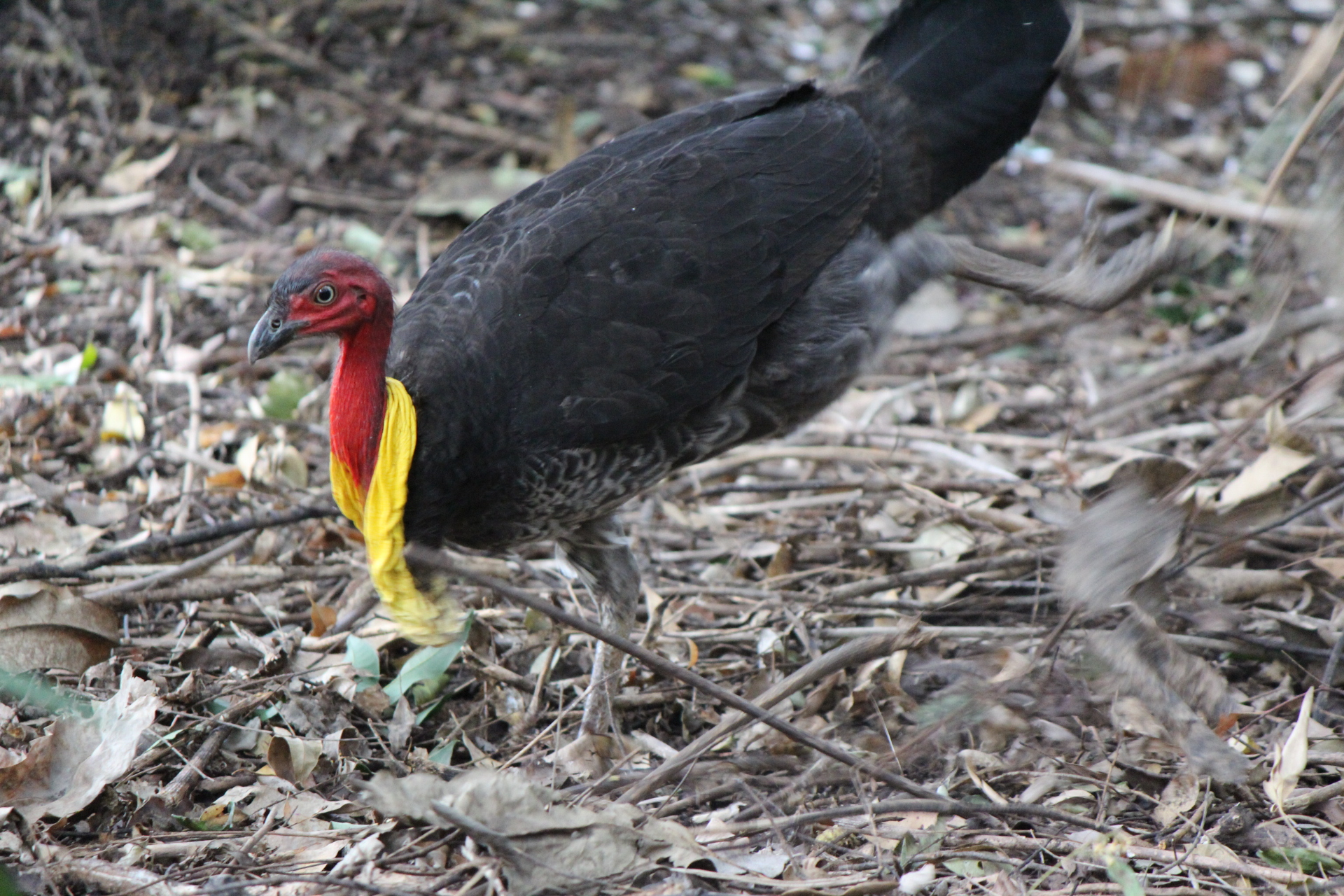
Male Australian brushturkey at Mount Coot-tha, Queensland

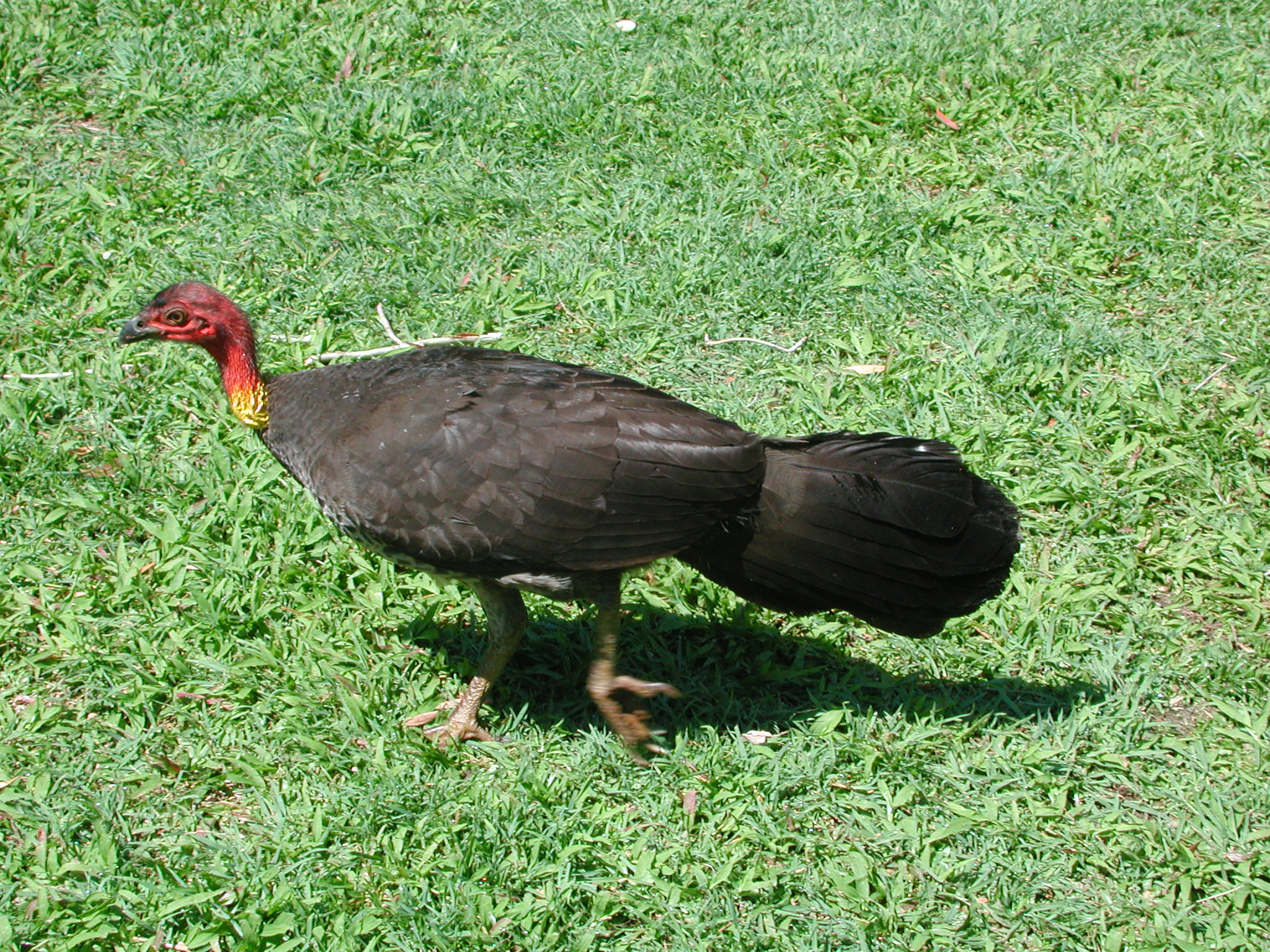
Female Australian brushturkey

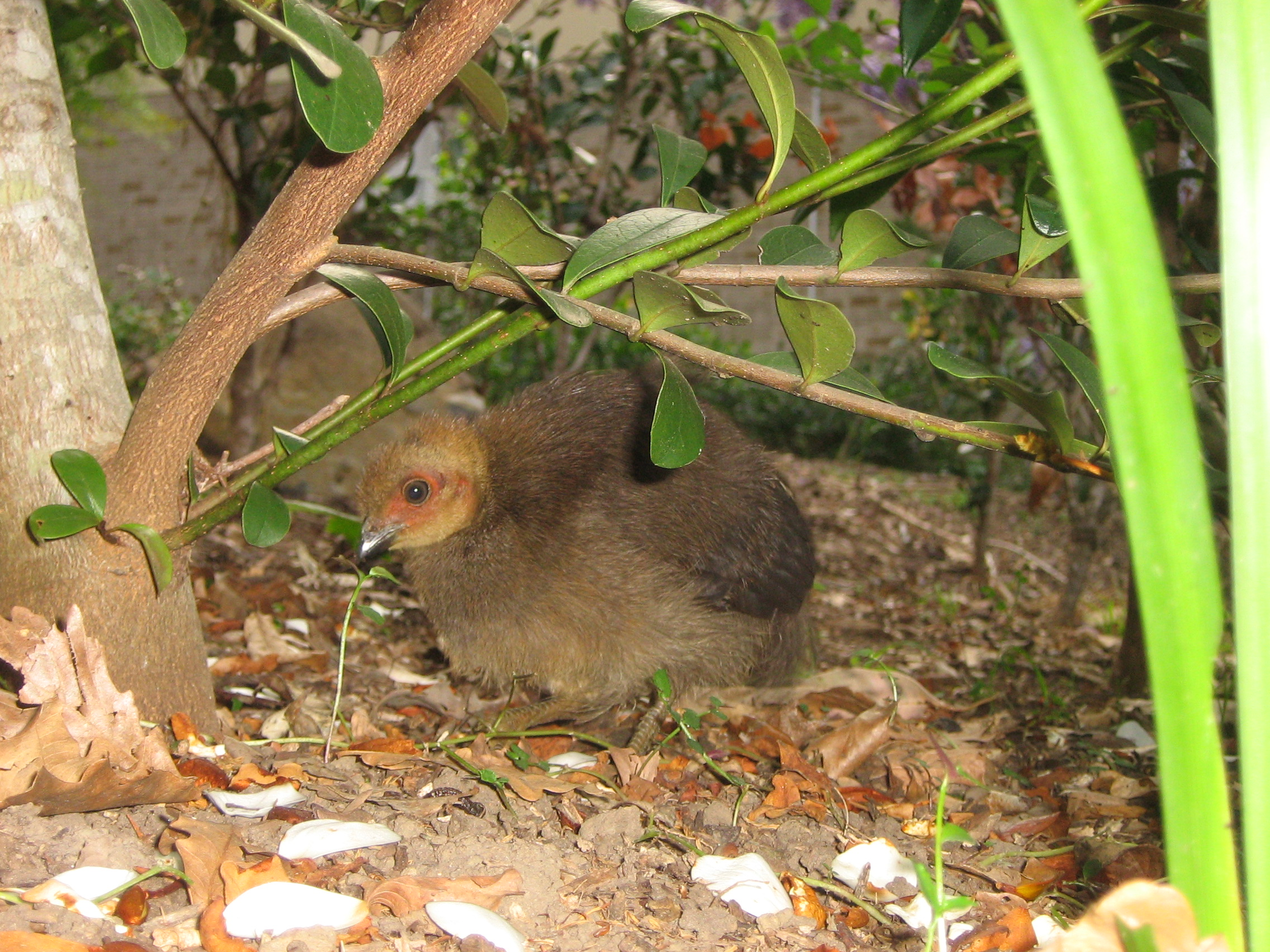
Australian brushturkey chick

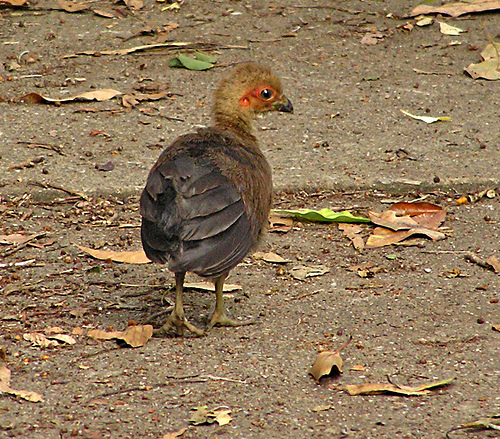
Juvenile

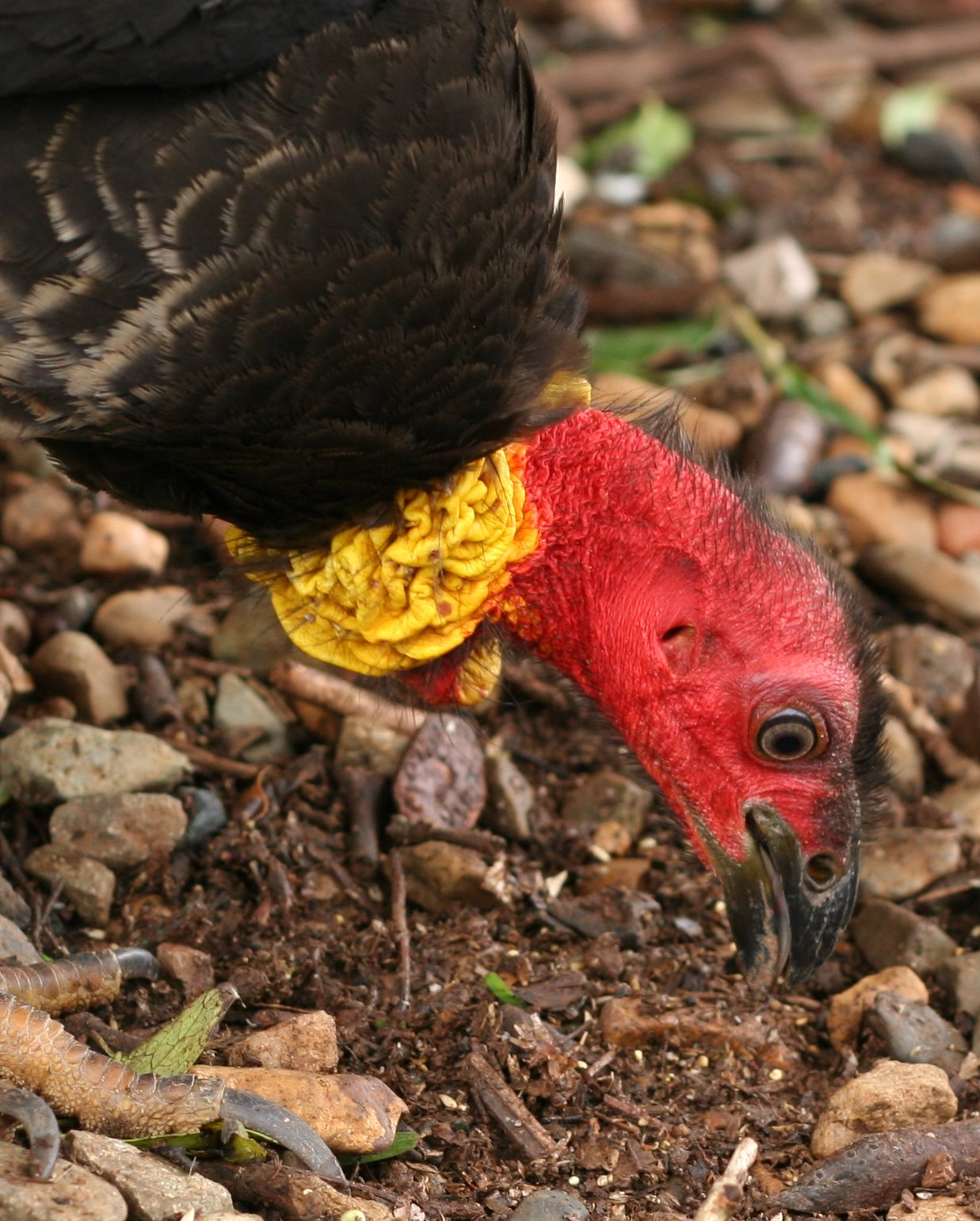
Male, A. l. lathami head details

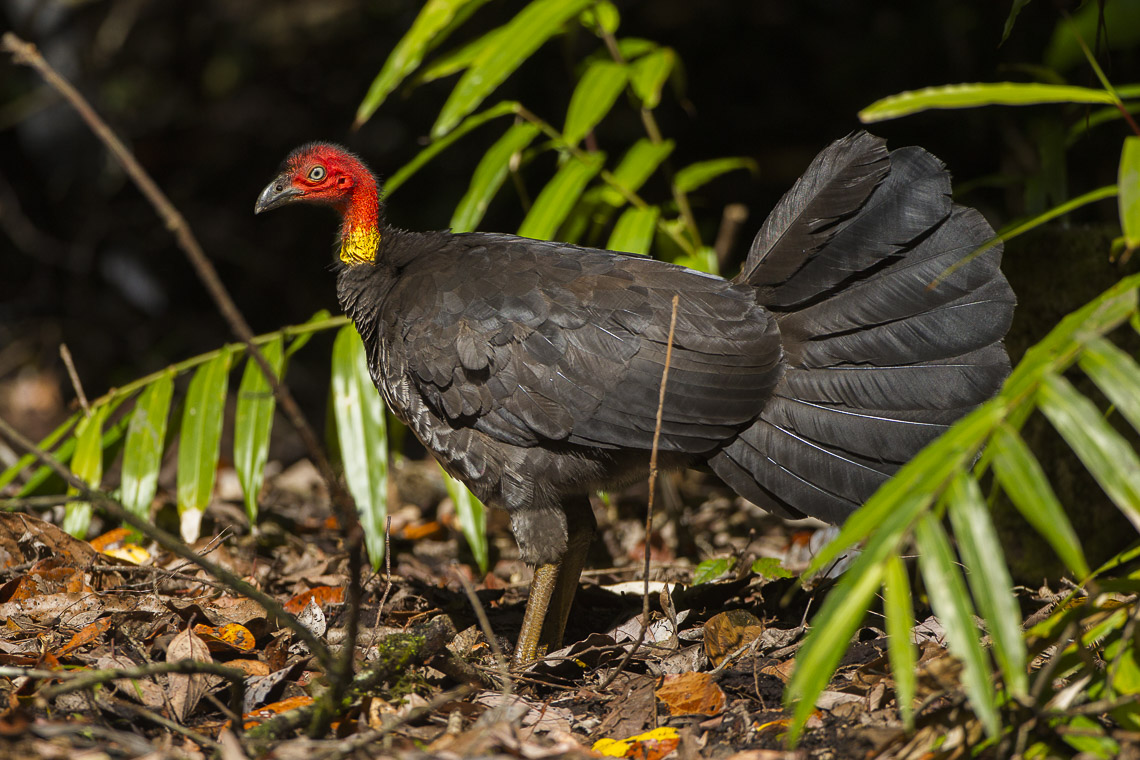
Adult

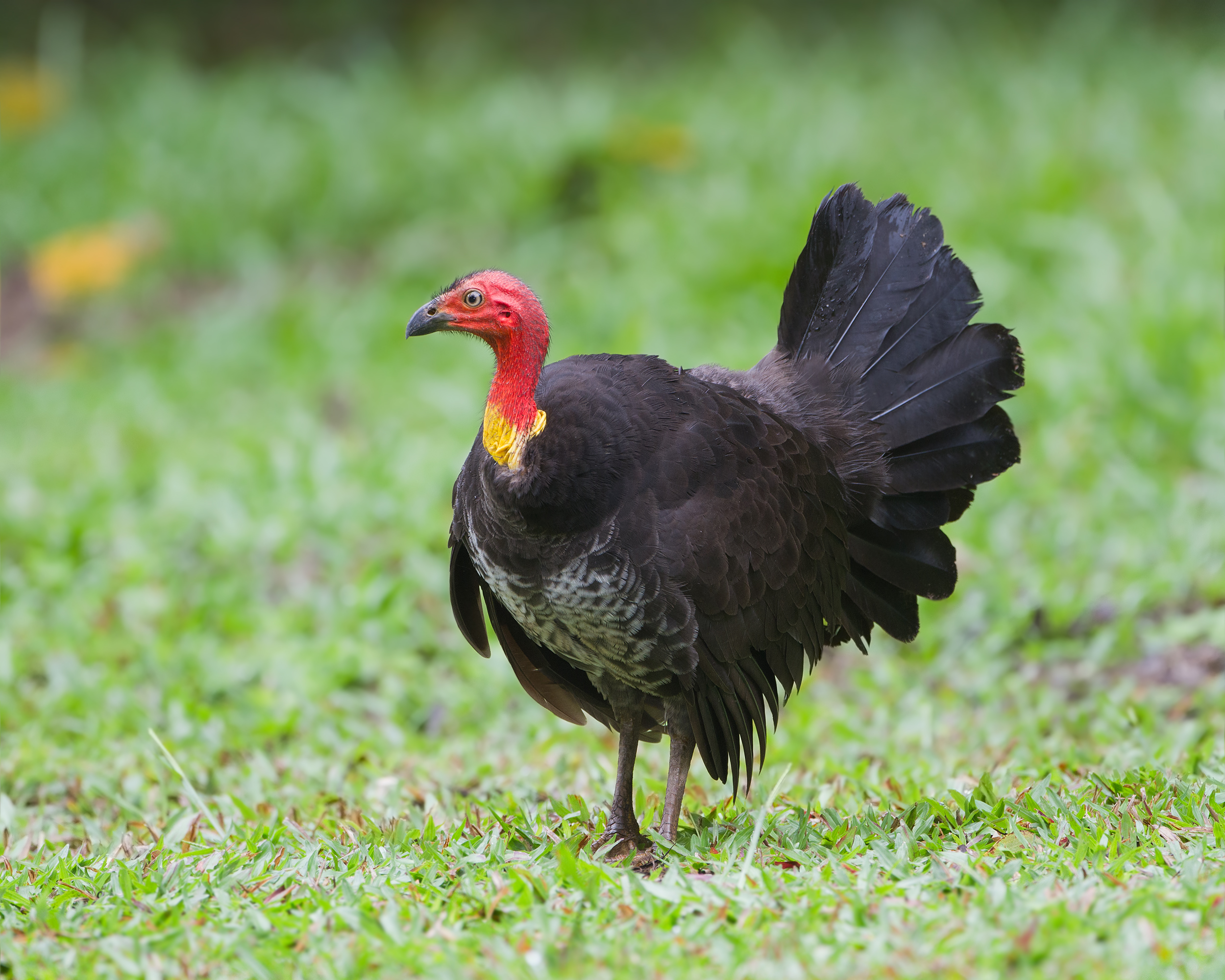
Cairns, Queensland, Australia

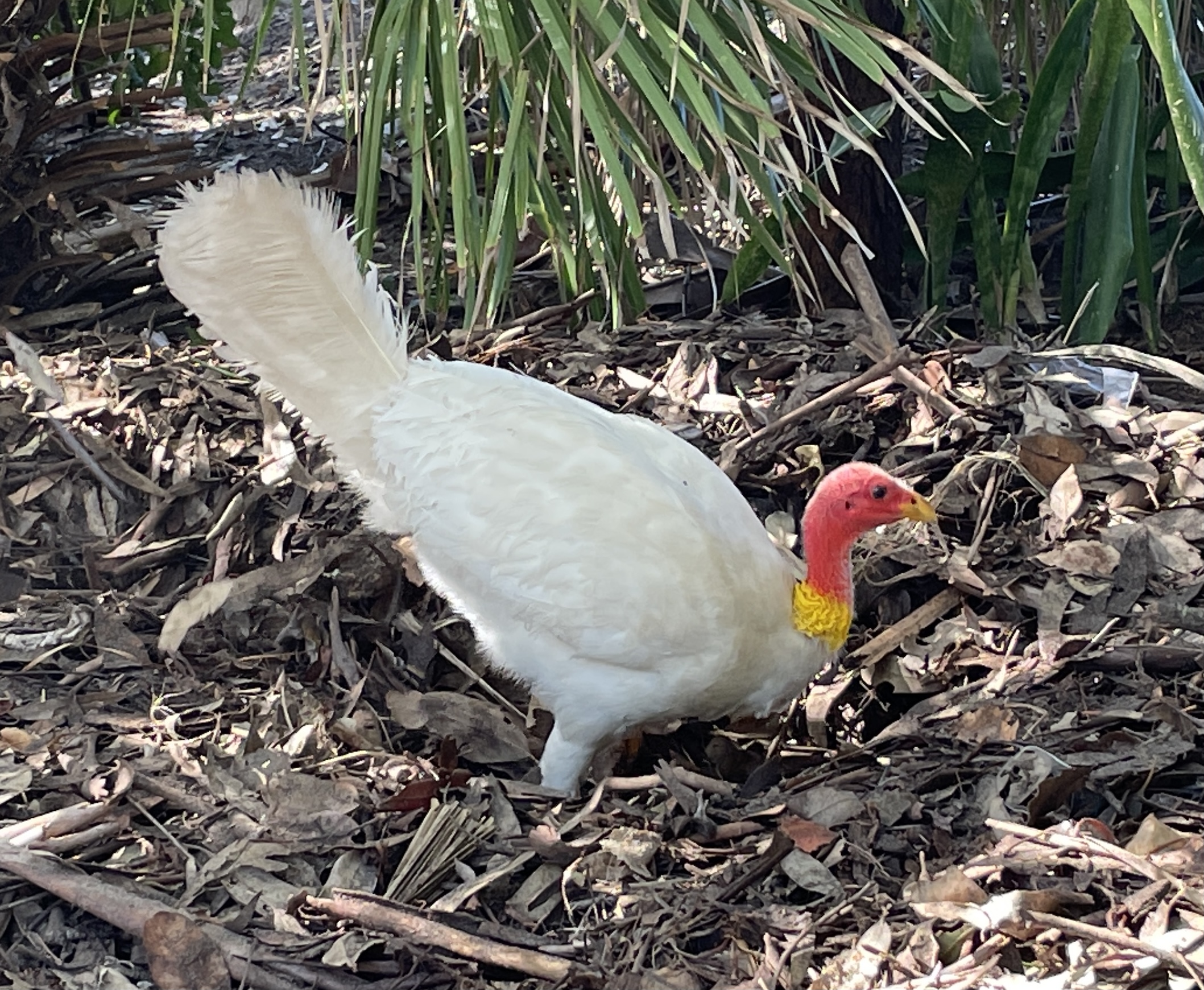
"Mr Albines", a male Australian brushturkey (albino) in Noosa, Queensland, Australia

Australian brushturkey in a suburban backyard, Sydney, Australia

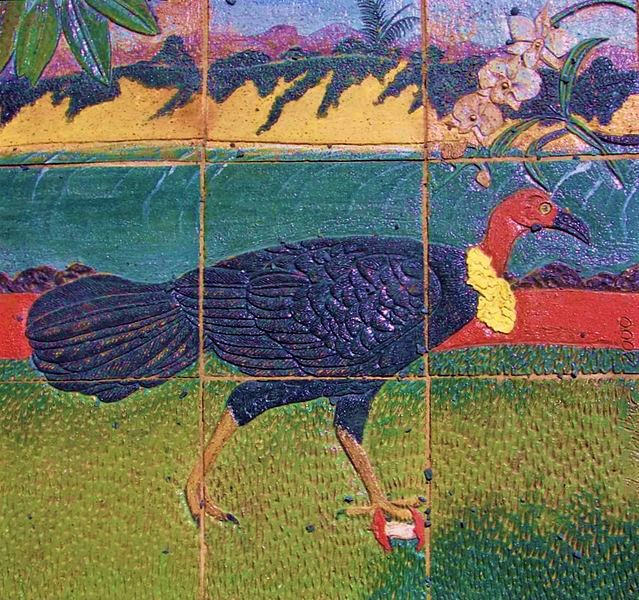
Male brushturkey on tiles, Cooktown, Queensland

Brushturkey approaching human hand at Saltwater National Park, New South Wales
