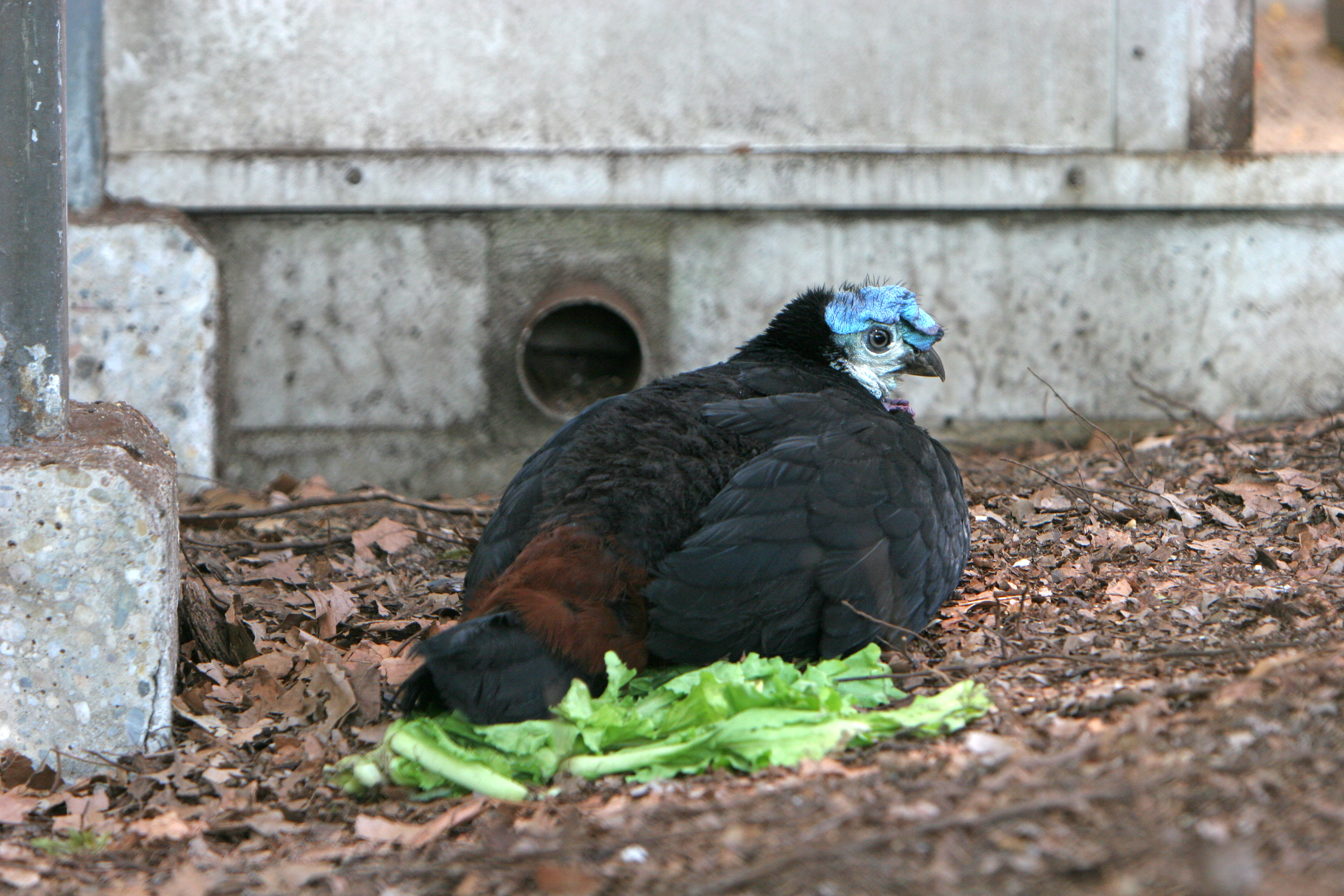
- Wattled brushturkey (Aepypodius arfakianus)

Scientific classification
- Kingdom: Animalia
- Phylum: Chordata
- Class: Aves
- Order: Galliformes
- Family: Megapodiidae
- Genus: Aepypodius; Oustalet, 1880

Type species
- Talegallus bruijnii Salvadori, 1877

Species
- 2, see text

= Aepypodius =

Genus of birds

Aepypodius is a genus of birds in the family Megapodiidae.

It contains the following two species:

Image	Scientific name	Common name	Distribution
	Aepypodius arfakianus	Wattled brushturkey	New Guinea Highlands
	Aepypodius bruijnii	Waigeo brushturkey	Waigeo Island of West Papua.
