= Nuisance fee =

A nuisance fee is a fee, fine, or penalty which is charged to deter an action, rather than to compensate for the costs of that action. For example, a five-dollar penalty for submitting an application late does not compensate for costs associated with processing late submissions, but rather encourages people to submit on time.
