= Fine (penalty) =

Financial penalty

A fine or mulct (the latter synonym typically used in civil law) is a penalty of money that a court of law or other authority decides has to be paid as punishment for a crime or other offense. The amount of a fine can be determined case by case, but it is often announced in advance.

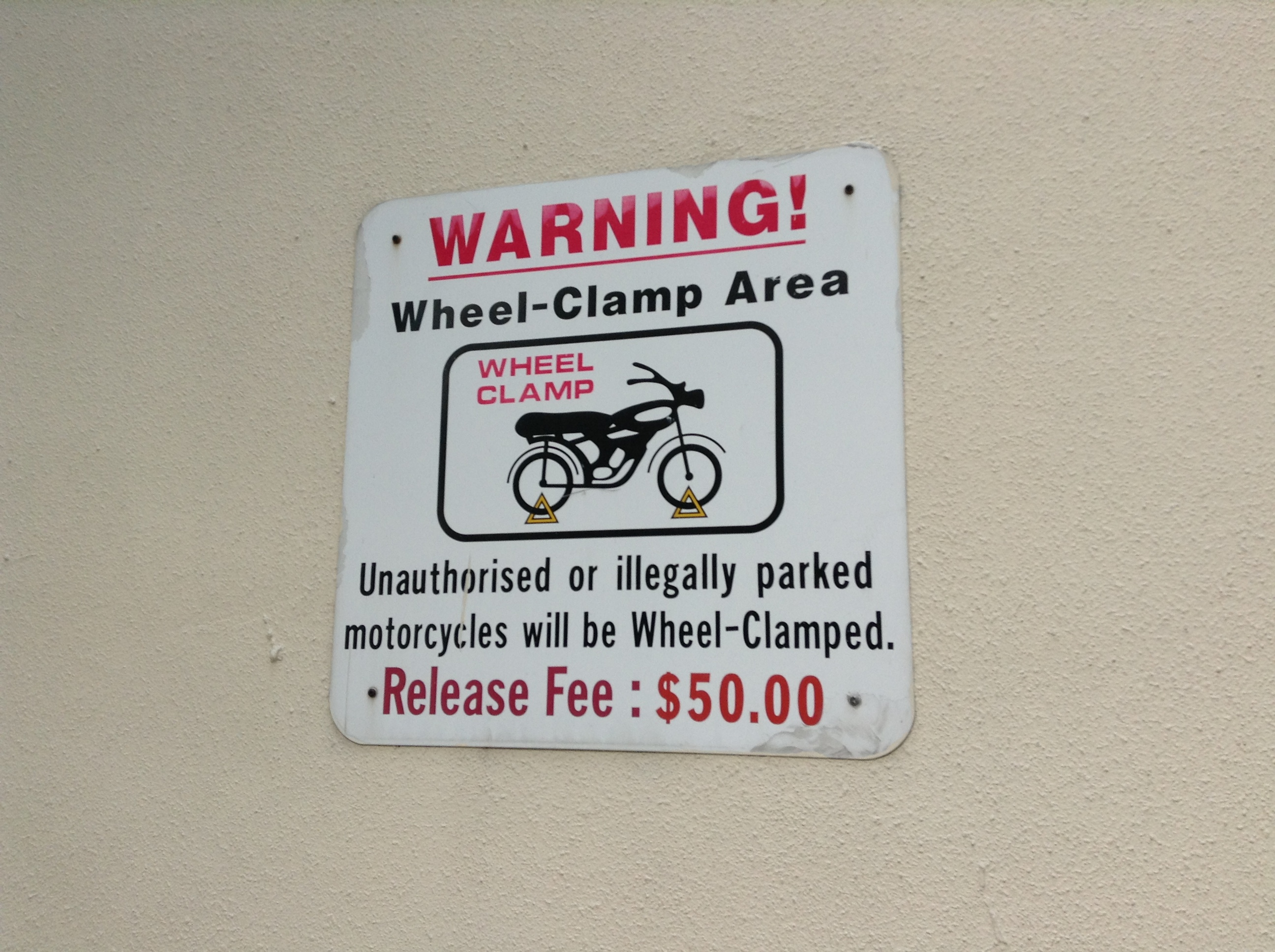
A warning sign in Singapore that states the fee for releasing vehicles that are immobilized with wheel clamps by private security in a non-public area

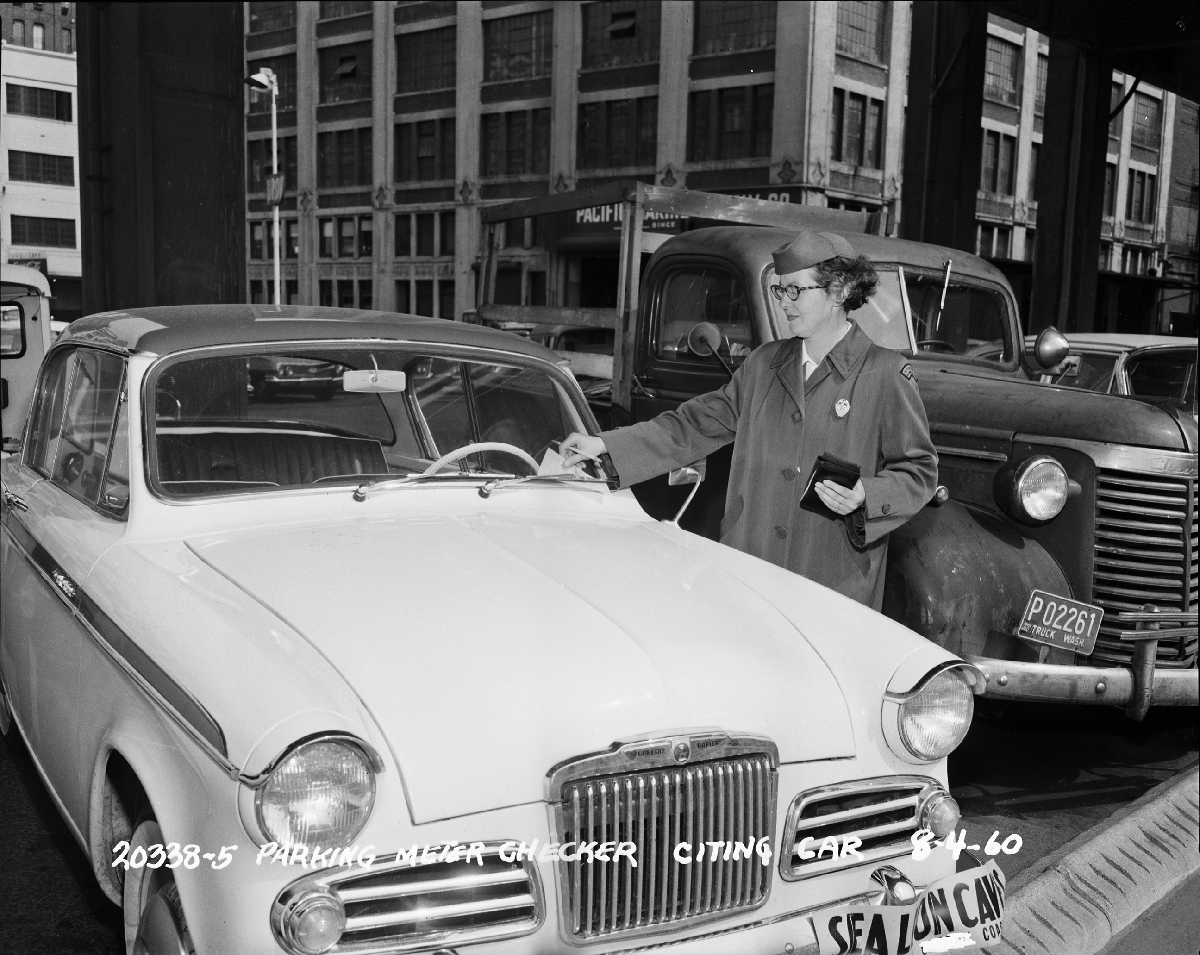
A parking attendant issuing a fine for illegal parking in Seattle, Washington, 1960

The most usual use of the term is for financial punishments for the commission of crimes, especially minor crimes, or as the settlement of a claim.

One typical example of a fine is money paid for violations of traffic laws. In English common law, relatively small fines are used either in place of or alongside community service orders for low-level criminal offences. More considerable fines are also given independently or alongside shorter prison sentences when the judge or magistrate considers a large amount of retribution is necessary, but there is unlikely to be a significant danger to the public. For instance, fraud is often punished by substantial fines since fraudsters are typically banned from the position or profession they abused to commit their crimes.

Fines can also be used as a form of tax. Money for bail may be applied toward a fine.

A day-fine is a fine that, above a minimum, is based on personal income (similar to progressive taxation), as opposed to a fine of a fixed amount. Day-fines are often implemented to alleviate some of the burden on people experiencing poverty, who might otherwise have issues paying/affording some fines.

Some fines are small, such as for loitering, for which fines (in the United States) range from about $25 to $100. In some areas of the United States (for example California, New York, Texas, and Washington D.C.), fines for petty crimes, such as criminal mischief (shouting in public places, projecting an object at a police car) range from $2,500 to $5,000.

== Fines by country ==
=== England and Wales ===
In the Magistrates' Courts Act 1980, unless the context otherwise requires, the expression "fine", except for any enactment imposing a limit on the amount of any fine, includes any pecuniary penalty or pecuniary forfeiture or pecuniary compensation payable under a conviction.

In section 32 of that Act, the expression "fine" includes a pecuniary penalty but does not include a pecuniary forfeiture or pecuniary compensation.

In sections 15 to 32 and 48 of the Criminal Law Act 1977, the expression "fine" includes any pecuniary penalty.

In England, there is now a system whereby the court gives the offender a 'fine card', which is somewhat like a credit card; at any shop that has a paying-in machine, he pays the value of the fine to the shop, which then uses the fine card to pass that money on to the court's bank account.

A related concept is the fixed penalty notice, a pecuniary penalty for some minor crimes that can be either accepted (instead of prosecution, thus saving time and paperwork) or taken to court for regular proceedings for that crime. While technically not a fine, which, under the Bill of Rights 1689, may be levied only following a conviction, it serves the same purpose of punishment.

Early examples of fines include the weregild or blood money payable under Anglo-Saxon common law for causing a death. The murderer would be expected to pay a sum of money or goods dependent on the victim's social status.

=== The Netherlands ===
==== General information ====
The Dutch Criminal Code (Dutch: Wetboek van Strafrecht (WvSr)) doesn't contain specific amounts for fines for every violation of the law. Instead of that, the Criminal Code provides six fine categories. Every penalty clause of the Criminal Code contains a fine category. The categories are:

Category	Maximum height of the fine Wetboek van Strafrecht (European Netherlands)	Maximum height of the fine Wetboek van Strafrecht BES (Caribbean Netherlands)
First	€515	$280
Second	€5,150	$2,800
Third	€10,300	$5,600
Fourth	€25,750	$14,000
Fifth	€103,000	$56,000
Sixth	€1,030,000	$560,000

These sums are only an upper limit, it's up to the judge or the prosecutor to determine the exact sum of the fine. However, the amount of the fine must be at least €3. The sums of categories are always 1, 10, 20, 50, 200 and 2000 times the amount of the first category. In addition to the fine, the convict also has to pay an administration fee of €9. The amounts are established by the government, via a royal order.

When the judge convicts an individual to a fine, the judge must also set a term of substitute imprisonment. This substitute imprisonment will be executed in the case that the fine remains unpaid. The judge may count one-day imprisonment for every unpaid €25, however usually judges reckon one day for every €50 which stays unpaid. However, the substitute imprisonment must be at least one day (even though the fine was €3) and cannot exceed one year (even though the penalty was €100,000).

==== Execution of a court-imposed fine ====
Once a person is irrevocably convicted of a fine, it's up to the public prosecutor to collect the fine. To do so, the cjib (centraal justiteel incassobureau (English: central judicial collection agency)) is established.

First, the CJIB will send the convict the fine. If the convict pays the penalty, the case is closed (by paying, the convict loses the right to go into appeal as well); if they do not, the case will be continued. The CJIB will then send the convict a reminder, though this reminder will contain an increment of €15. If this doesn't lead to the payment of the fine, the CJIB will send another reminder, now with a raise of 20%, however, the raise must be at least €30. When the fine continues to be unpaid, the CJIB will instruct a bailiff to collect the penalty nonetheless. This bailiff may, for example, seize the convict's income and sell his possessions. If these measures do not result in the full fine collection, the bailiff will return the case to the prosecutor. The prosecutor will order the police to arrest the convict to execute the earlier written substitute imprisonment. The length of the imprisonment will be percentage-wise reduced if the convict has paid a sum but not the entire fine amount. After the substitute imprisonment the convict will be a free man again. He also won't have to pay the fine anymore, and the case will be closed.

==== Frequently committed traffic violations ====
===== General information =====
Before 1 September 1990, all traffic violations were punished via the criminal law. The suspects were first offered a sort of plea bargain. This mostly contains a fine. If the suspect didn't pay the fine of this plea bargain, the public prosecutor had to open a criminal case. Otherwise, he wasn't authorized to collect the penalty through force. The case had to be withdrawn when the capacity of the courts or the prosecutor's office didn't allow the start of a criminal case for a traffic violation. This was the case very often. This situation led to a negative spiral because traffic offenders hoped and expected their case to be withdrawn and not pay the plea bargain fine. This led to growing pressure on the capacity of the courts, which caused more sepots (decisions not to prosecute). This encouraged more offenders not to pay, etc.

To stop this spiral, the secretary general of the justice department (at that time), Dr. Albert Mulder, designed a new law enforcement system. Under this new system, the government acquired the right of summary foreclosure. The summary foreclosure means that the CJIB can execute the fine directly unless the fined subject goes to appeal.

The Administrative Enforcement of Traffic Rules Act (Dutch: Wet administratiefrechtelijke handhaving verkeersvoorschriften (WAHV)) regulates the system regarding frequently committed traffic violations. According to the WAHV, the maximum sum of the administrative fine is the same as the maximum amount of the first category (Art. 2 section 3 WvSr Criminal Code). The exact fine per violation is determined by an annex of the WAHV. In addition to the fine, the fined subject will also have to pay €9 administration costs as well. The amount of the administration costs will also be determined by the minister.

==== Process of the administrative fine ====
Once a subject has been fined by an officer or photographed by a speed camera, he will receive a decision within four months. This decision will contain a short description of the violation, the place and time the violation was committed and the sum of the fine. The subject will have two choices now. He can pay the fine, or he can go into appeal. In contrast to the court-imposed fine, when the subject has paid the fine, he will keep the right to go into appeal. The subject can go into appeal within six weeks. In the first instance, the subject appeals to the public prosecutor. The prosecutor shall withdraw the fine completely when he thinks the appellant has right. He will lower the fine sum if he thinks the suspect is partially correct. If the prosecutor believes the suspect is wrong, he will uphold the fine. The suspect does not have to pay the fine as long as the prosecutor has not decided on the appeal yet.

Once the prosecutor has decided, the suspect will again have two choices. He can pay, or he goes into appeal at the sub-district judge of his arrondissement (or the arrondissement of the place where the disputed violation was committed). But now, the suspect has to pay the fine as a surety. If the suspect doesn't pay the surety, the judge will declare him inadmissible (thus the fine will be upheld). The judge will have the same choices as the prosecutor. He can withdraw the fine, lower the fine, or uphold the fine.

If the (remaining) fine is higher than €70 and the suspect or/nor the prosecutor disagrees with the sub-district judge's verdict, the suspect or the prosecutor can go into appeal for the last time. He does that at the court of appeal of Arnhem-Leeuwarden in Leeuwarden. This appeal will be in writing, unless the appellant, per se, wants to do it orally. If the fine is lower than €70, or the appellant's appeal is rejected in Leeuwarden, there will be no legal remedies anymore and the case will be closed. The appellant's surety will be transformed into a fine.

== See also ==
- Amercement
- Asset forfeiture — in which the results of a crime and items used in a crime are seized
- Civil penalty
- Damages
- Day-fine
- Library fine
- Nuisance fee
- Penalty units
- Standard scale
