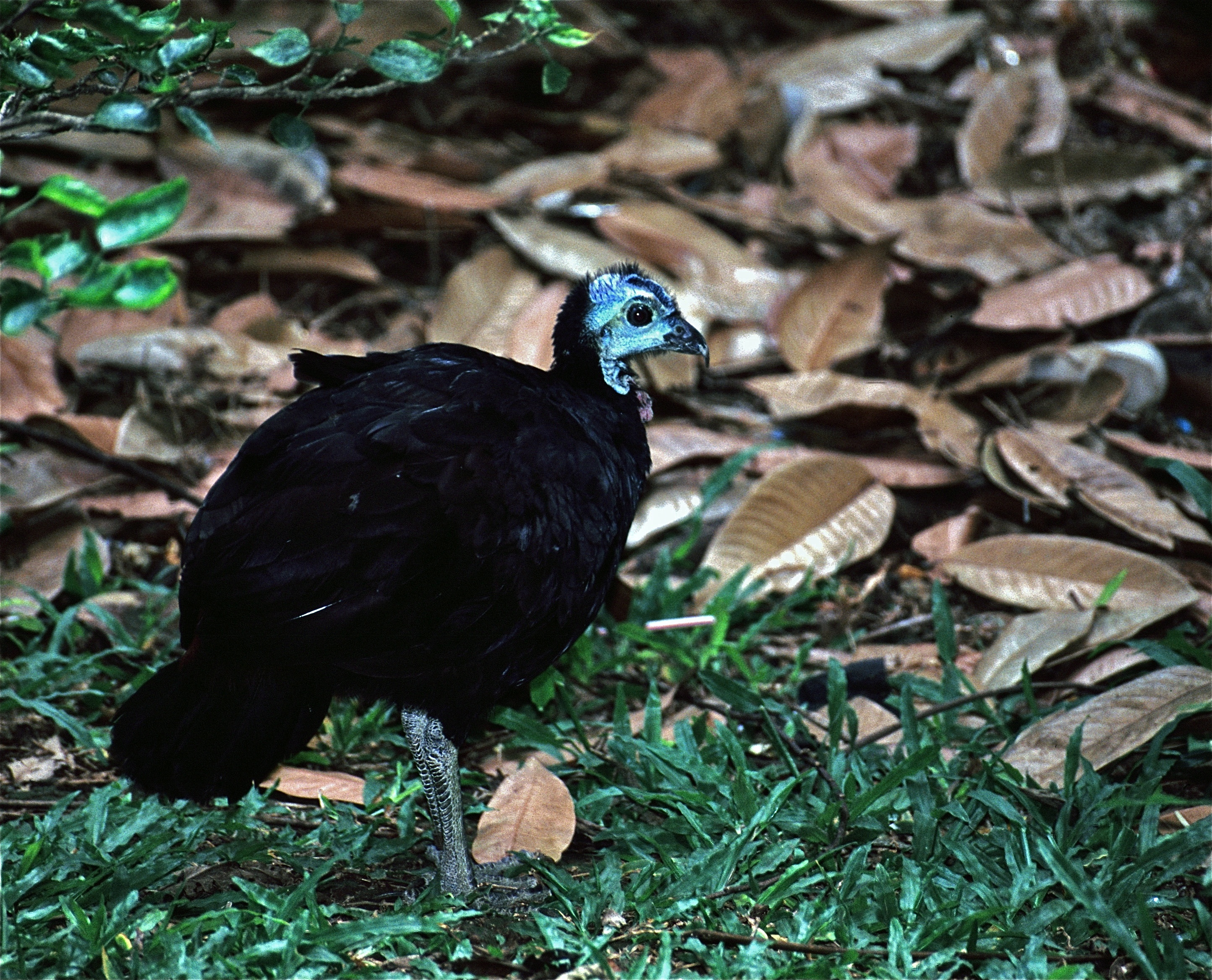

Conservation status
- Least Concern (IUCN 3.1)

Scientific classification
- Kingdom: Animalia
- Phylum: Chordata
- Class: Aves
- Order: Galliformes
- Family: Megapodiidae
- Genus: Aepypodius
- Species: A. arfakianus

Binomial name
- Aepypodius arfakianus (Salvadori, 1877)
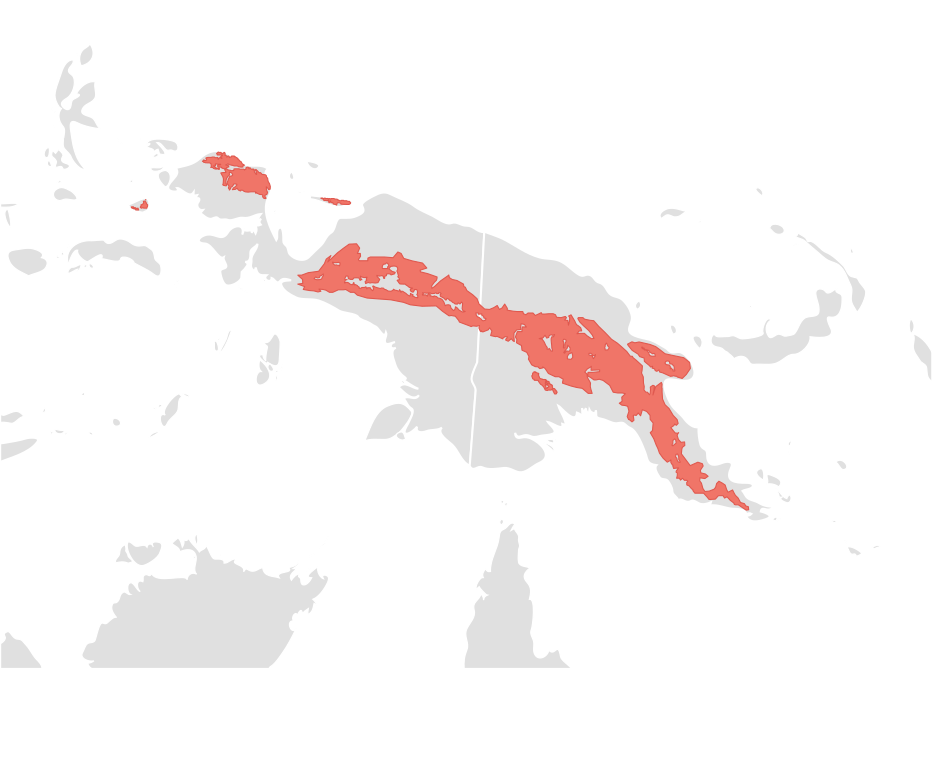
- Range of A. arfakianus

Synonyms
- Talegallus arfakianus, Talegallus pyrrhopygius, Aepypodius pyrrhopygius

= Wattled brushturkey =

Wattled Brushturkey

Species of bird

The wattled brushturkey (Aepypodius arfakianus) is a species of bird in the family Megapodiidae found year-round in New Guinea. Its natural habitats are subtropical or tropical moist lowland forest and subtropical or tropical moist montane forest.

== Taxonomy ==
The wattled brush-turkey was first formally described from collected chick specimens by Italian ornithologist Tommaso Salvadori in 1877 under the name Talegalla arfakianus. In 1881, French zoologist Émile Oustalet first described its adult specimens and named them as Talegallus (Aepypodius) pyrrhopygius, unaware that they represented the same species. The difference in plumage between the young and adults led to the temporary separation until 1893, when a comparison of specimens confirmed that both names referred to the same taxon. Following this revision, the species was placed in the genus Aepypodius as Aepypodius arfakianus.

The wattled brush-turkey belongs to the Megapode family (Megapodiidae) within the order Galliformes. It is closely related to the Waigeo brushturkey and can be told apart from other brushturkeys of the Talegalla genus by its lack of wattles on the side of the neck.

The genus name is derived from the Greek words αἰπύς (aipus), meaning "steep" or "high," and ποδός (podos), meaning "foot," alluding to its strong legs and preference for highly elevated habitats. The specific epithet arfakianus refers to the Arfak Mountains of northwestern New Guinea, where the species was first described.

=== Subspecies ===
There are two recognized subspecies:

Image	Scientific name	Distribution	Notes
Head of Wattled Brushturkey	A. a. arfakianus (Salvadori,1877)	Mountains of New Guinea and Yapen, Indonesia.	Nominate subspecies.
Bird Park, Wisata Bogor, Java, ID	A. a. misoliensis (Ripley, 1957)	Restricted to Misool, Indonesia.	Slightly smaller, with a blue comb.

== Description ==
The wattled brushturkey is a relatively large megapode, with adults measuring about 38–46 cm in length and weighing roughly between 1.2 and 1.6 kg. Its plumage is predominantly black, with the face dull and mostly bare, but it is easily identified by its deep chestnut rump and feathered nape. It also possesses proportionally larger tarsi than other megapodes, with colour ranging from grey to brown. The species shows sexual dimorphism, with males being slightly larger and bearing more developed head ornamentation than females.

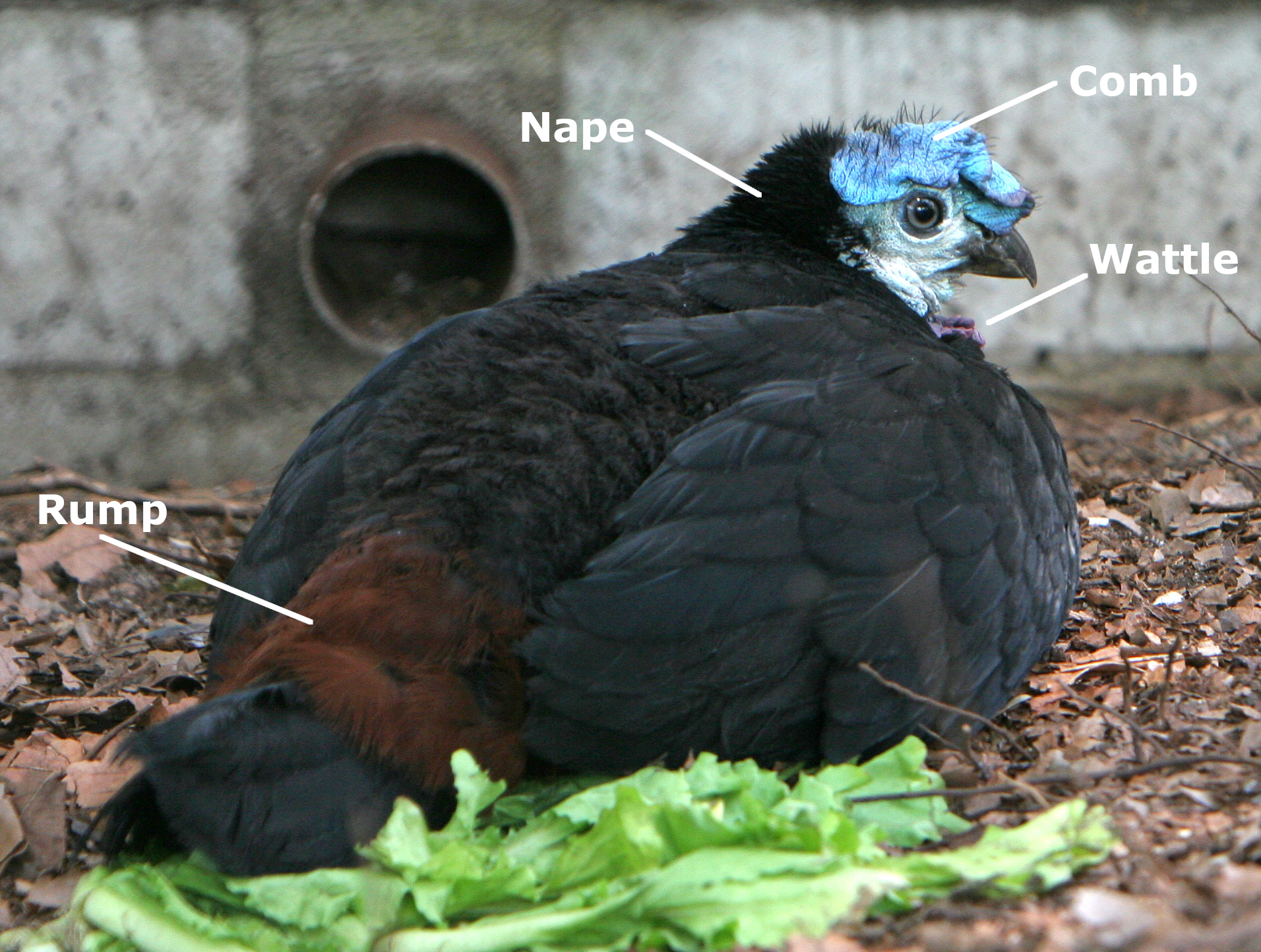
Key identification features

Adult males are distinguished by their brightly coloured chicken-like combs on the forehead and their single pendulous wattles hanging from the throat. Both structures enlarge during periods of sexual activity, with the comb reaching up to 3 cm in height and the wattle extending to roughly 6 cm. Ornament colouration also differs greatly between subspecies. In the nominate subspecies, the comb and lower wattle usually display bright red hues, with the remaining bare skin exhibiting pale bluish tones. In contrast, the Misool subspecies is known to display striking light blue combs.

Adult females tend to resemble males but are noticeably smaller and less ornamented than them. The head is more densely covered in short bristle feathers, and the fleshy comb is reduced to a low, narrow ridge. The single wattle is present but thin and short, lacking the dramatic enlargement seen in males during the breeding period. The bare head and neck are also more subdued in colour. The length of the feet tends to be smaller, though they maintain their characteristic robustness.

Newly hatched chicks are highly precocial, emerging from the mound fully feathered. The body is predominantly brown, with an ochre feathered head and dark wings reaching a sooty black colour.

== Distribution and habitat ==
=== Distribution ===
The wattled brushturkey is found in the montane regions of New Guinea, where its nominate subspecies contains a broad but fragmented range of approximately 685,000 km^{2}. It occurs along the central mountain chain from the east Sudirman Range to the west Owen Stanley Range and in several other elevated areas, such as the Tamrau and Arfak Mountains of the Bird's Head Peninsula. The second subspecies is restricted to Misool Island in the Raja Ampat archipelago, focused in the central limestone hills. A small population has also been observed on Yapen, where nesting mounds have been recorded at 1,250 m elevation, though its subspecies remains unknown.

=== Habitat ===
The wattled brushturkey is known to favour steep forested mountainsides with a strong reliance on dense forest cover and can be found at elevations above 1,000 m. In areas where it overlaps with Talegalla and Megapodius species, the wattled brushturkey occurs mainly within the 750–1,500 m elevation band.

== Behaviour ==
The wattled brushturkey is a shy and inconspicuous bird, spending most of its time on the ground. When disturbed, the species flies up into trees, where it roosts until the perceived danger is gone. Adults are generally solitary and do not form cohesive flocks, while immature birds are speculated to live in small groups.

=== Diet ===
Like other megapodes, the species is an opportunistic ground forager. It scratches through leaf litter in search of fallen fruits, seeds, insects, and other invertebrates, therefore making it omnivorous. They tend to forage during the day, from early in the morning to late afternoon, a pattern that is shared with other megapodes.

=== Vocalization ===
The wattled brushturkey has a varied vocal repertoire. Its primary call is described as a harsh crowing of six down-slurred notes, transcribed as "kyew kyew-kyew-kyew-kyew kyew". At the start of the breeding season, males give a distinctive rhythmic call, consisting of about seven repeated notes, transcribed as "hja hja hjahjahjahja hja," that lasts for roughly 3 seconds. As the season progresses, the call becomes shorter and less rhythmic, decreasing to five notes. By the end of the season, males give only two or one note, lasting for about 1.3 seconds.

Females, on the other hand, only give a brief, single-syllable call while laying eggs at the mound. No contact calls between the sexes have been reported.

=== Breeding ===
As is typical of megapodes, wattled brushturkeys do not brood their eggs. Instead, they build and maintain large mounds, where eggs are buried and incubated without the presence of the adults. The mounds are built by the male over several weeks and consist of amalgamated leaf litter, soil, and other plant material. Heat is produced inside the mound as it naturally decomposes, with the male consistently regulating the internal temperature by adding or removing material as needed. Once the eggs are laid, they incubate for 50 to 70 days. Chicks hatch underground and make their way to the surface by digging upward with their feet. Once they emerge, they are fully feathered and capable of flight. They leave the mound immediately without ever receiving parental care.

== Conservation status ==
Although its population trend is decreasing, the wattled brushturkey is currently classified as Least Concern on the IUCN Red List as of 2024. However, the isolated Misool subspecies is regarded as Vulnerable due to its very limited distribution range and population size. The subspecies is threatened by habitat loss due to the logging of the forested limestone hills where it is known to reside.
