= Penalty unit =

Australian standard used to compute penalties for breaches of law

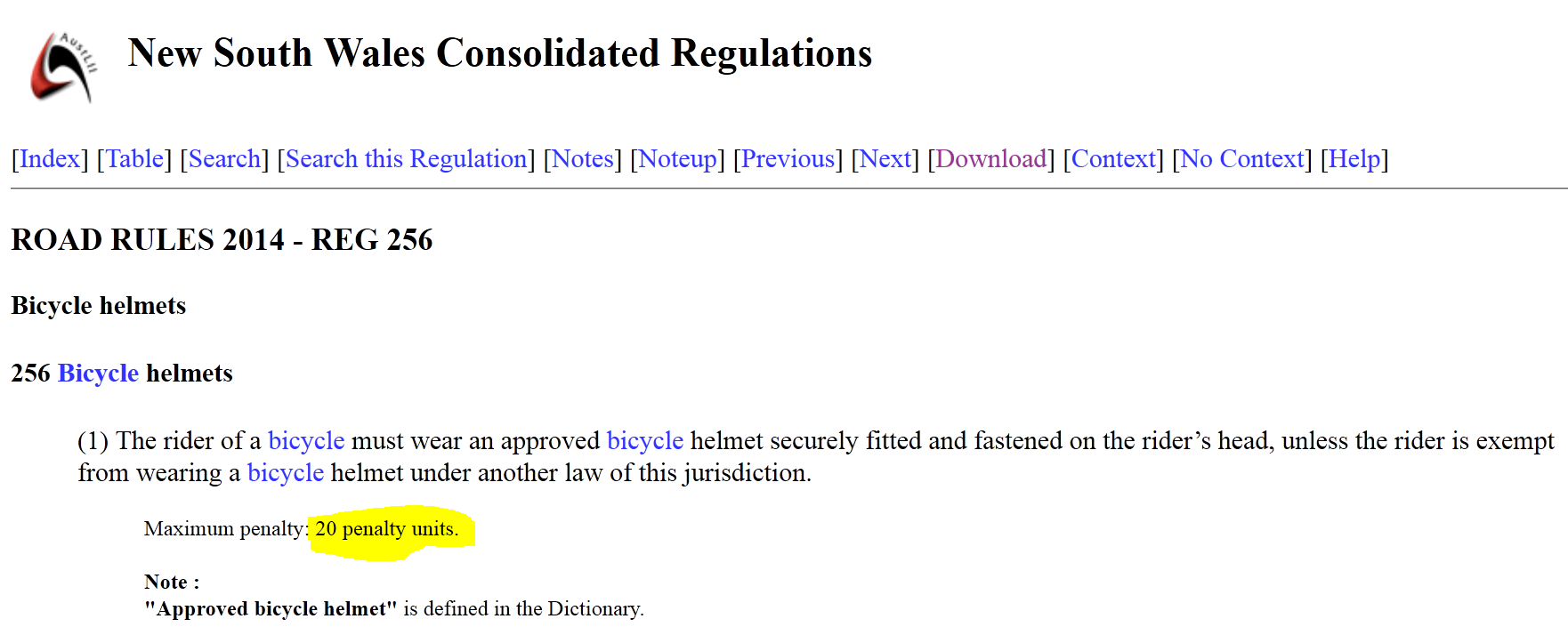
Penalty units note in reg 256 of ROAD RULES 2014, New South Wales, Australia.

A penalty unit (PU) is a standard amount of money used to compute penalties for many breaches of law in Australia at both the federal, and state and territory level. Fines are calculated by multiplying the value of a penalty unit by the number of units prescribed for the offence. For example, if an offence was committed in New South Wales worth 100 units, the fine would be 100 × $110 = $11,000.

Prior to the introduction of penalty units, fines and other charges were usually prescribed in terms of ordinary money. However, the effects of inflation meant that originally substantial penalties eventually lost their worth. Frequent amendment of the many laws and regulations dealing with pecuniary penalties would be a very time-consuming process. Penalty units provide a quick and simple way to adjust many different fees and charges.

== Values ==
The different jurisdictions that make up Australia each set their own value of a penalty unit. The value as well as the manner and frequency of adjusting that value differ between jurisdictions.

Jurisdiction	Penalty unit value	Last updated	Automatic indexation mechanism
Australian Capital Territory	A$160.00 (individual)	8 November 2018	Reviewed every four years.
Australian Capital Territory	A$810.00 (companies)	8 November 2018	Reviewed every four years.
Commonwealth	A$364.00	1 July 2026	Typically every three years on 1 July, based on the All Groups Consumer Price Index, a weighted average of the CPI for all capital cities.
New South Wales	A$110.00	8 December 1999	None. As of 28 March 2026, the value remains unchanged from the original Crimes (Sentencing Procedure) Act 1999.
Northern Territory	A$194.00	1 July 2026	Annual on 1 July, based on CPI for Darwin.
Queensland	A$172.70	1 July 2026	Annual on 1 July.
South Australia	Not applicable	—	South Australia does not have a system of penalty units. Instead, legislation either lists specific fine amounts or maximum "divisional penalties" which form a standard scale.
Tasmania	A$213.00	1 July 2026	Annual on 1 July, based on CPI.
Victoria	A$209.10	1 July 2026	Annual on 1 July.
Western Australia	Various	—	Penalty units are set for different categories of legislation. Traffic offences generally incur a penalty unit of A$50.

== See also ==
- Standard scale
