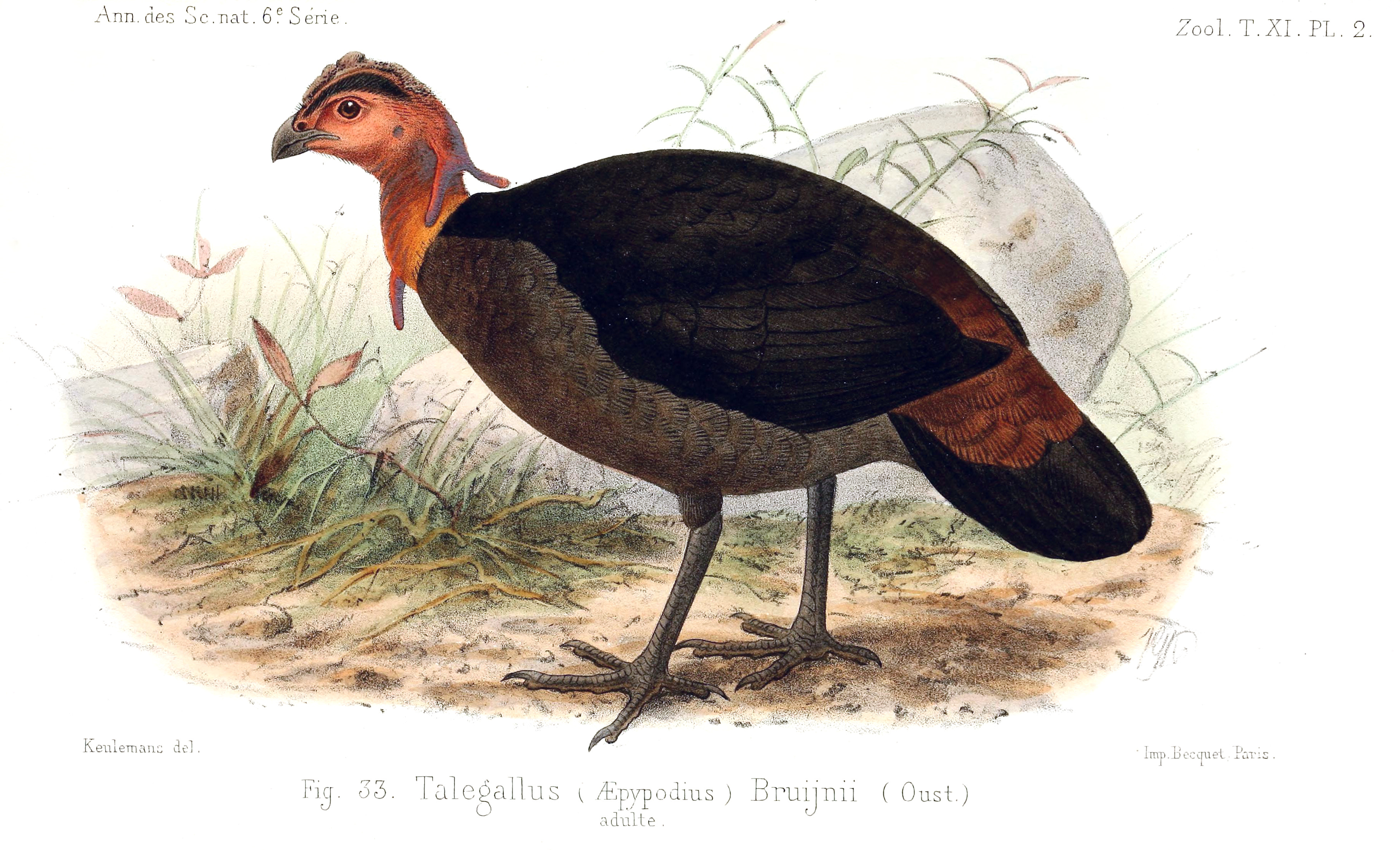

Conservation status
- Endangered (IUCN 3.1)

Scientific classification
- Kingdom: Animalia
- Phylum: Chordata
- Class: Aves
- Order: Galliformes
- Family: Megapodiidae
- Genus: Aepypodius
- Species: A. bruijnii

Binomial name
- Aepypodius bruijnii (Oustalet, 1880)

= Waigeo brushturkey =

Species of bird

The Waigeo brushturkey (Aepypodius bruijnii) or Bruijn's brushturkey, is a large (approximately 43 cm long) brownish-black megapode with a bare red facial skin, red comb, maroon rump, and chestnut brown below. There are two elongated red wattles on the back of the head and a long wattle on the foredeck. Both sexes are similar. The female has a smaller comb and no wattles.

An Indonesian endemic, the Waigeo brushturkey inhabits mountain forests on Waigeo Island of West Papua.

Previously known from less than twenty-five specimens, this little-known species was relocated in 2002. The name commemorates the Dutch merchant Anton August Bruijn.

This bird is threatened by hunting, ongoing habitat loss, small population size, and a limited range. It was formerly classified as a Vulnerable species by the IUCN. But new research has shown it to be rarer than it was believed. Consequently, it was uplisted to Endangered status in 2008.
