= Turkey (disambiguation) =

Turkey is a country in Asia and Europe.

Turkey may also refer to:

== Animals ==
- Turkey (bird), the genus Meleagris of large birds native to North and Central America
  - Wild turkey (Meleagris gallopavo)
    - Domestic turkey (Meleagris gallopavo domesticus), a domesticated version of the species
      - Turkey meat, the meat of the bird
  - Ocellated turkey (Meleagris ocellata), a Mexican bird
  - Californian turkey (Meleagris californica), extinct c. 10000 BC
- Turkey vulture or turkey buzzard, a scavenger bird native to the Americas
- Brushturkey, birds native to Oceania
- Turkey moray, an eel found in the Indian and Pacific Oceans

== Arts and entertainment ==
- "The Turkey", a short story by Flannery O'Connor
- The Turkey (film), a 1951 French film
- Turkeys (film) or Free Birds, a 2013 American animated film
- Turkey (bowling), a bowling term used to denote three consecutive strikes
- Turkey! Time to Strike, a Japanese anime series

== Places ==
- Turkey, South Africa, a town in South Africa
- Turkey, North Carolina, a town
- Turkey, Texas, a city
- Turkey Brook, Hertfordshire, England
- Turkey Mountain (Georgia)
- Turkey Mountain (New York)
- Turkey Ponds, two connected ponds in New Hampshire
- Turkey River (Iowa)
- Turkey River (New Hampshire)
- Turkey Run (West Branch Susquehanna River tributary), a river in Pennsylvania
- Turkey Creek (disambiguation)
- Turkey Island (disambiguation)
- Hotel Turkey, a hotel in Turkey, Texas

=== Historic states ===
- 'Turkey', named used for the Ottoman Empire (1299–1922)
- State of Turkey (1920–23)

== Ships ==
- USS Turkey (AM-13), a minesweeper laid down in 1917
- USS Turkey (AMS-56), a minesweeper laid down in 1943

== Other uses ==
- Turkey (nickname), list of people with the name or nickname

== See also ==
- Bush turkey (disambiguation)
- Tuckey (name)
- Turk (disambiguation)
- Turke (disambiguation)
- Turki
- Türkiye (disambiguation)
- Turky (disambiguation)
