= Brushturkey =

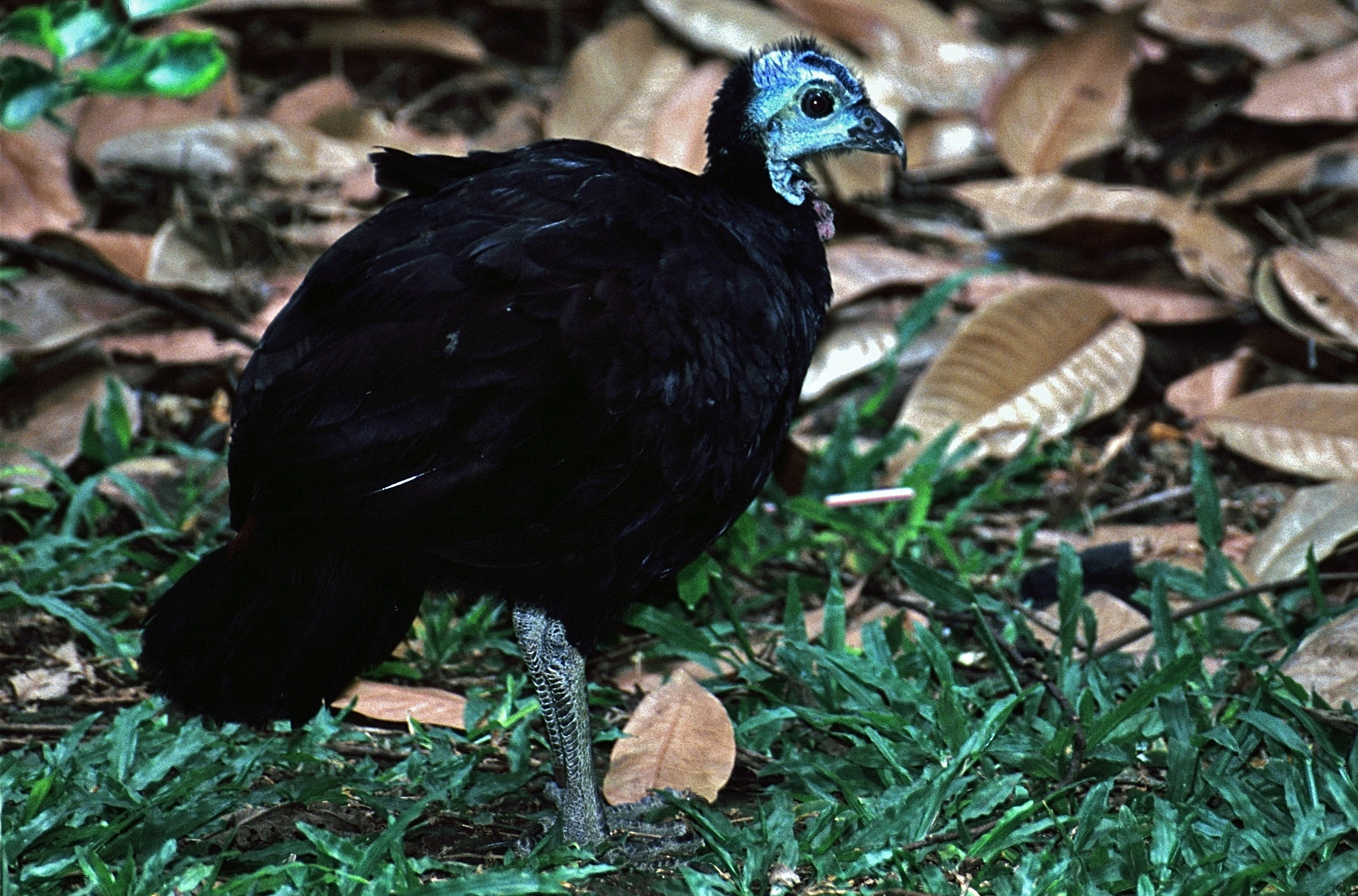
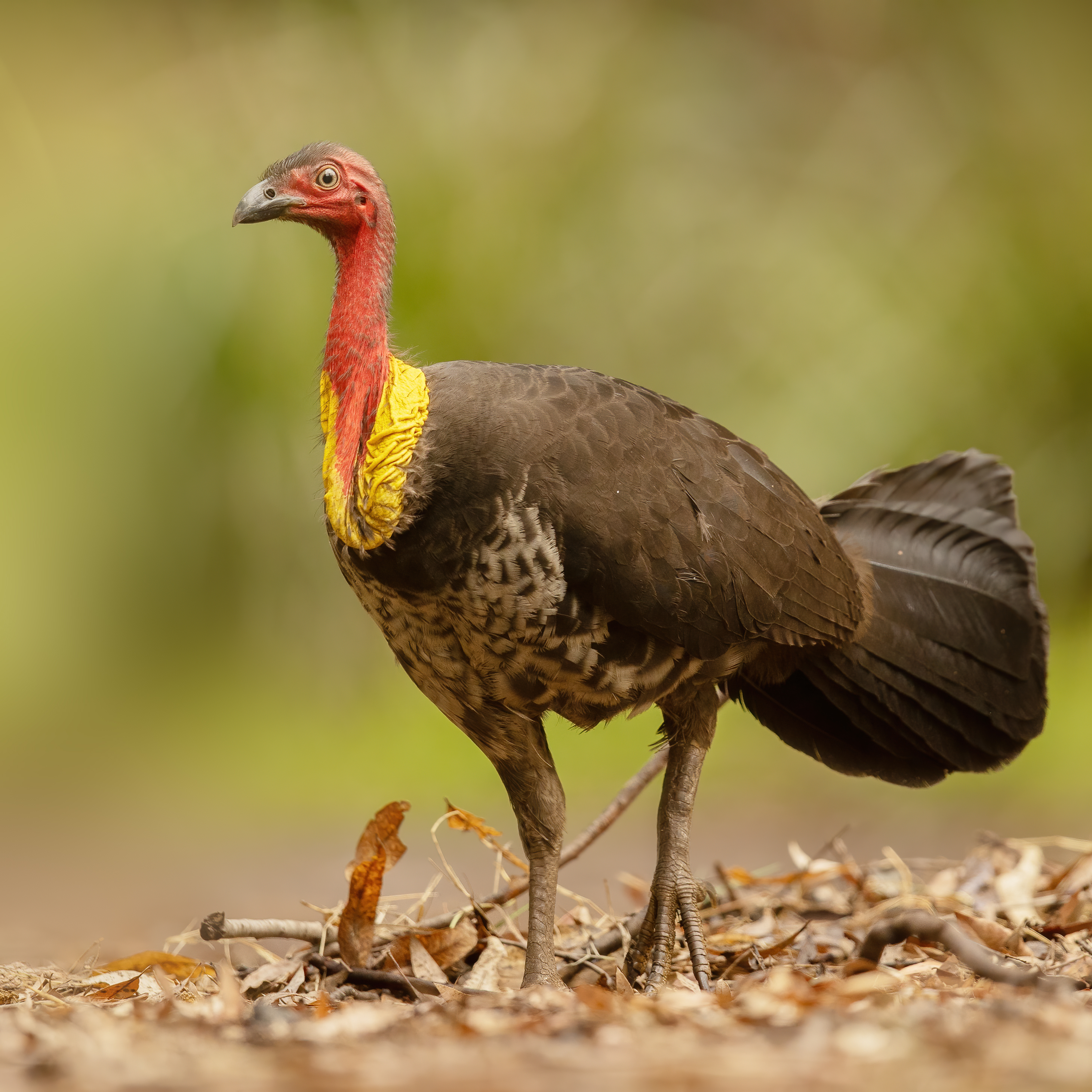
Wattled brushturkey (Aepypodius arfakianus), top; Australian brushturkey (Alectura lathami), bottom.

Brushturkey, brush-turkey or brush turkey generally refer to birds in three genera in the megapode family, and sometimes to other species such as the Australian bustard.

== Megapodes ==
| Image | Genus | Living species |
|---|---|---|
| | Alectura Latham, 1824 | Australian brushturkey, Alectura lathami |
| | Aepypodius Oustalet, 1880 | Wattled brushturkey, Aepypodius arfakianus; Waigeo brushturkey, Aepypodius bruijnii |
| | Talegalla Lesson, 1828 | Red-billed brushturkey, Talegalla cuvieri; Black-billed brushturkey, Talegalla fuscirostris; Collared brushturkey, Talegalla jobiensis |

Brushturkeys also includes the following extinct fossil genera, all known from Australia and all from the Pleistocene (c. 2.58 million to 11,700 years ago):

| Image | Extinct genus | Extinct species |
|---|---|---|
| | †Progura | †Progura gallinacea – Queensland; †Progura campestris – South Australia |
| | †Latagallina | †Latagallina naracoortensis (Note: Formerly Progura naracoortensis) – New South Wales; †Latagallina olsoni – South Australia |

== See also ==
- Bush turkey (disambiguation)
