= Turkic =

Turkic may refer to:

- anything related to the country of Turkey
- Turkic languages, a language family of at least thirty-five documented languages
  - Turkic alphabets (disambiguation)
  - Turkish language, the most widely spoken Turkic language
- Turkic peoples, a collection of ethno-linguistic groups
  - Turkic migration, the expansion of the Turkic tribes and Turkic languages, mainly between the 6th and 11th centuries
  - Turkic mythology
  - Turkic nationalism (disambiguation)
  - Turkic tribal confederations

== See also ==
- Turk (disambiguation)
- Turki
- Turkish (disambiguation)
- Turkiye (disambiguation)
- Turkey (disambiguation)
