= Turkish =

Turkish may refer to:

- Something related to Turkey
  - Turkish language
    - Turkish alphabet
  - Turkish people, a Turkic ethnic group and nation
    - Turkish citizen, a citizen of Turkey
    - Turkish communities in the former Ottoman Empire
- The word that Iranian Azerbaijanis use for the Azerbaijani language
- Ottoman Empire (Ottoman Turkey), 1299–1922, previously sometimes known as the Turkish Empire
  - Ottoman Turkish, the Turkish language used in the Ottoman Empire
- Turkish Airlines, an airline
- Turkish music (style), a musical style of European composers of the Classical music era
- Turkish, a character in the 2000 film Snatch

== See also ==
- Turk (disambiguation)
- Turki
- Turkic (disambiguation)
- Turkey (disambiguation)
- Turkiye (disambiguation)
- Turkish Bath (disambiguation)
- Turkish population, the number of ethnic Turkish people in the world
- Culture of Turkey
- History of Turkey
  - History of the Republic of Turkey
- Turkic languages
