= Orthodox Christianity in Turkey =

The term Orthodox Christianity in Turkey may refer to:

- Eastern Orthodox Christianity in Turkey, representing communities and institutions of Eastern Orthodox Church, in Turkey
- Oriental Orthodox Christianity in Turkey, representing communities and institutions of Oriental Orthodox Churches, in Turkey

== See also ==
- Orthodox Christianity (disambiguation)
- Turkey (disambiguation)
