= Turki (name) =

- Pronunciation: IPA: [ˈturkiː]
- Gender: Male

Origin
- Origin: Arabic
- Meaning: Turkish
- Region of origin: Arab World

Other names
- Alternative spelling: Turkee

Turki (Arabic: تركي, IPA: [ˈturkiː]) is a given name and surname, for more etymology, see Turki.

== Given name ==
- Turki ibn Abdallah, founder of the Second Saudi State
- Turki al-Binali, Bahraini Salafi preacher and senior cleric of ISIS
- Turki al-Hamad, Saudi Arabian political analyst
- Turki Al-Maliki, Saudi Arabian colonel
- Turki Faisal Al Rasheed, Saudi Arabian businessman
- Turki bin Said, Sultan of Oman
- Turki bin Abdulaziz Al Saud, Saudi royal
- Turki bin Abdulaziz Al Saud, Saudi Arabian royal
- Turki bin Abdullah Al Saud, Saudi Arabian politician
- Turki bin Bandar Al Saud, Saudi Arabian military officer
- Turki bin Faisal Al Saud, Saudi Arabian politician
- Turki bin Mohammed Al Saud (born 1979), Saudi Arabian politician
- Turki bin Muqrin bin Abdulaziz, Saudi Arabian businessman
- Turki bin Nasser Al Saud, Saudi Arabian military officer and businessman
- Turki bin Salman Al Saud, Saudi Arabian businessman
- Turki bin Sultan Al Saud, Saudi royal
- Turki bin Talal Al Saud, Saudi Arabian politician

== Surname ==
- Abdel Basset Turki, Iraqi politician
- Daud Turki, Palestinian poet
- Pandit Taba Ram Turki, Urdu and Persian poet from British India
- Rachid Turki, Tunisian football manager
- Yahia Turki, Tunisian painter
