= Turky =

Turky may be:

- a given name and surname:
  - Salim Turky, Tanzanian politician
  - Turky Al-Thagafi, Saudi Arabian footballer

== See also ==
- Turkiye (disambiguation)
- Turkey (disambiguation)
- Turke (disambiguation)
- Turki
