= Türkiye (disambiguation) =

Türkiye, better known as Turkey, is a transcontinental country straddling West Asia and Southeast Europe.

Türkiye or Turkiye may also refer to:

- Türkiye (newspaper), a Turkish newspaper
- LASH Ready Reserve Force Ship Turkiye, former name of the SS Cape Florida (AK-5071)

== See also ==
- Turkish (disambiguation)
- Turkic (disambiguation)
- Turkey (disambiguation)
- Turke (disambiguation)
- Turki (disambiguation)
- Turky (disambiguation)
- Turk (disambiguation)
