= Turke =

Turke may refer to:

- Turke, Croatia, a village near Delnice
- András István Türke, Hungarian academic
- Gerhard Türke, German army officer, recipient of the Knight's Cross of the Iron Cross
- John Turke, 14th-century chancellor of the University of Oxford

== See also ==
- Turkiye (disambiguation)
- Turkey (disambiguation)
- Turky (disambiguation)
- Turki
- Turk (disambiguation)
