= 2006 New England flood =

Flood in the New England region of the United States

A NEXRAD radar animation of the storm on May 12, 2006

The New England Flood of May 2006, often locally referred to as the Mother's Day Flood, was a flood event that occurred in New England, especially in New Hampshire and Massachusetts, during the month of May, 2006. It started on May 11, 2006 as a result of an unusually strong low pressure system that stalled over the central United States, drawing copious amounts of moisture from the Atlantic Ocean. Most of this moisture was drawn directly over New England, producing continuous heavy rain that led to record flooding near several rivers. It was described as the worst flooding since the New England Hurricane of 1938. There were at least two fatalities, both in Topsfield, Massachusetts. Some called it the Mother's Day Flood, since it occurred on that holiday.

== Impact ==
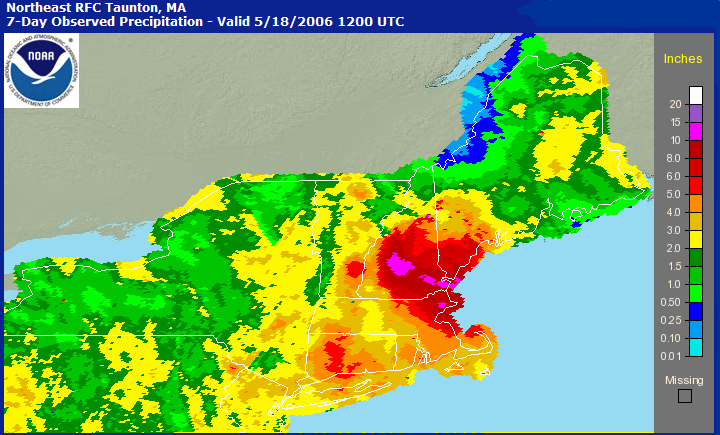
Rainfall totals for May 11, 2006 to May 18, 2006.

Hundreds of residents were evacuated from their homes as the waters rose. Several communities saw extensive flooding, particularly along the Merrimack River. Much of New England was under a flood warning or flash flood warning at some point in time.

The governors of Maine, Massachusetts and New Hampshire each declared a state of emergency for all or part of their respective states as a result of the flooding.

=== Connecticut ===
Compared to farther north and east, the flooding was relatively minor in Connecticut. It was most notable in low-lying areas along the Connecticut River.

=== Maine ===
Extreme southern Maine saw significant flooding, especially around the Mousam River, where evacuations were underway as the river rose quickly. Downtown York Beach was underwater, and severe flooding was also reported in the Kennebunk area.

The Spaulding Dam along the lower Salmon Falls River near Lebanon was also in danger of bursting, which led to the evacuation of portions of the community.

=== Massachusetts ===
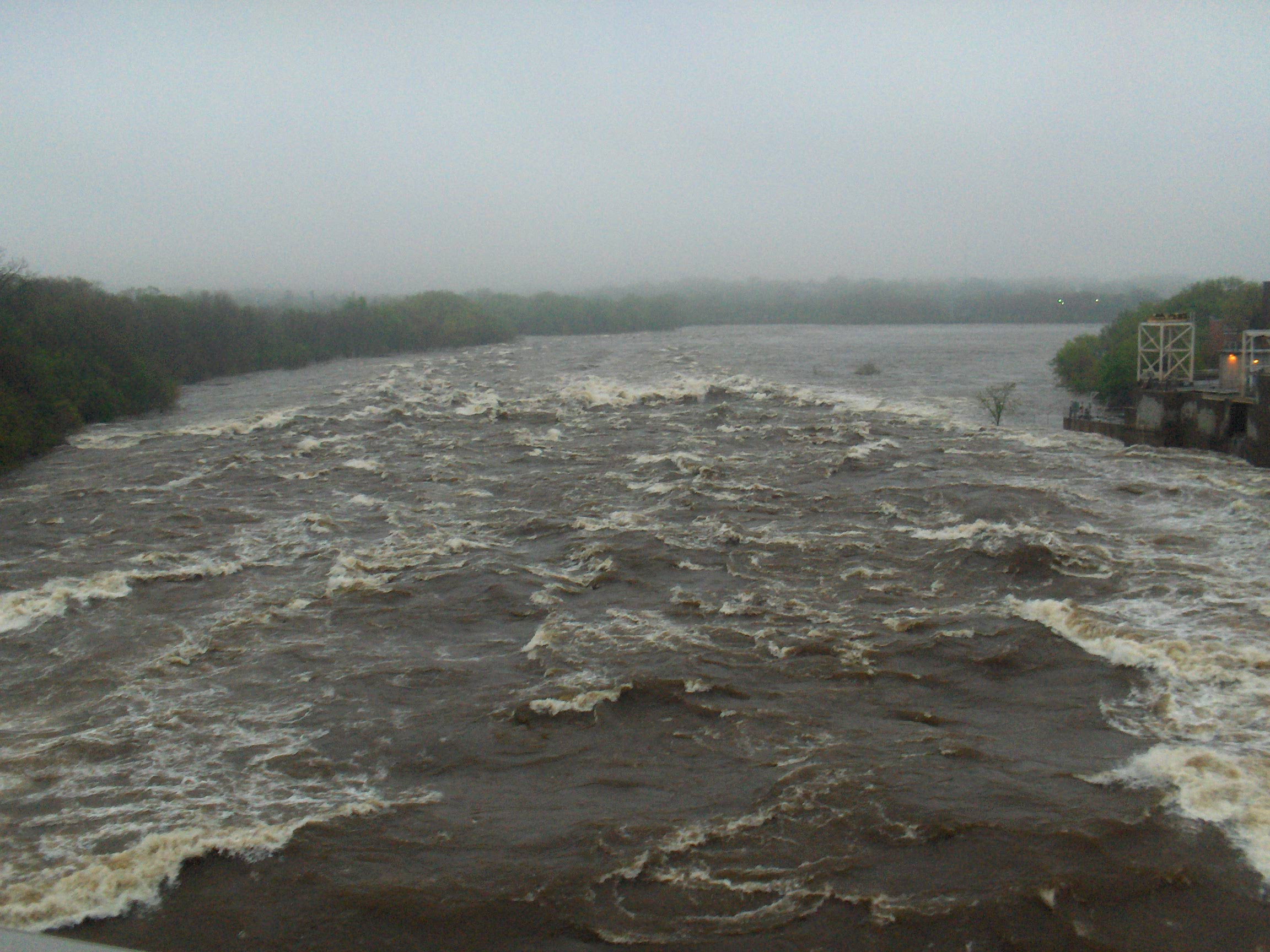
Merrimack River from University Avenue Bridge in Lowell, looking downriver

Numerous rivers overflowed in northeastern Massachusetts, and urban flooding also occurred. Thousands of people were evacuated and water was reported to be up to the rooftops of several homes. Several rivers, including the Merrimack and Charles rivers, threatened several communities. The Merrimack in Lowell was expected to reach more than 8 feet (2.4 m) above flood stage combined with 15 inches (380 mm) of rain.

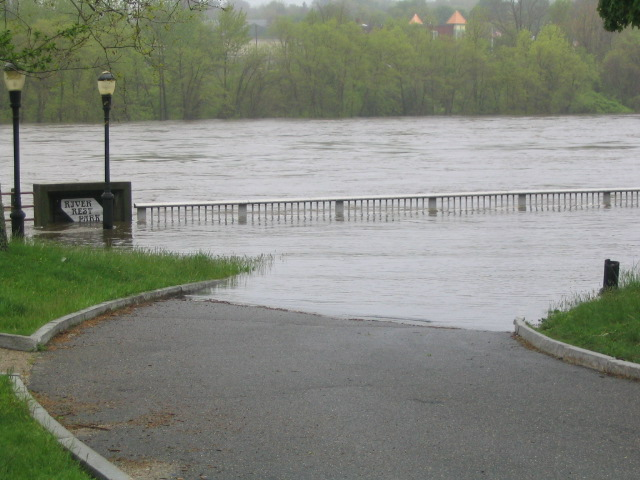
The Merrimack River during flooding in May 2006 in Haverhill, Massachusetts

The flooding also led to drowned waste water treatment plants, which overwhelmed sewage systems. Burst pipes in Haverhill dumped 35 million gallons (132,000 m^{3}) of waste a day into the Merrimack River. In addition, the flooding at another regional treatment plant in Lawrence was also very close to shutting down the power there, which would have sent sewage into the Merrimack at a rate of 115 million gallons (435,000 m^{3}) a day. For only the third time in a 150-year history, Lowell dropped its flood-controlling Francis Gate. Also, most notably in downtown Peabody, people could even be seen sailing in boats atop flooded areas.

Governor Mitt Romney toured the hard-hit community of Peabody on May 15 and described the situation as historic. "This is a level of crisis which is beyond anything these communities have ever experienced from water in their history". On Good Morning America the next day, Romney described the flooding as "almost Biblical" and said "We're sort of making jokes about Noah and taking two of each kind of animal because we haven't ever seen rain like this."

Numerous roads, including a busy section of US 1, were closed due to flooding. The Route 495 exit at Route 114 was also closed, the entire area under several feet of water. At that area, several businesses were damaged, including a Friendlys, a 7–11 and the first floor of a hotel.

=== New Hampshire ===
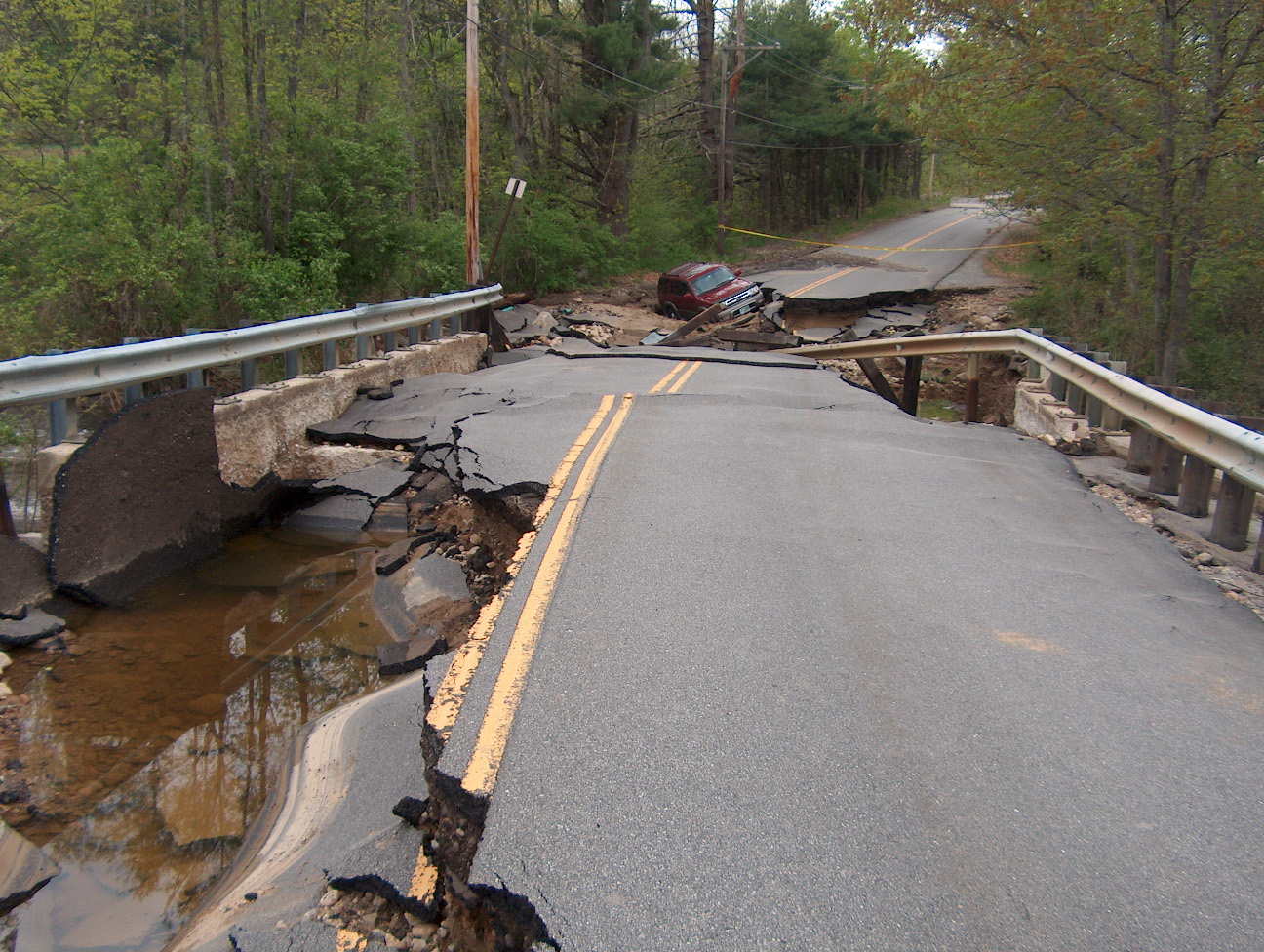
Turkey River crossing in Concord, NH, following the flood

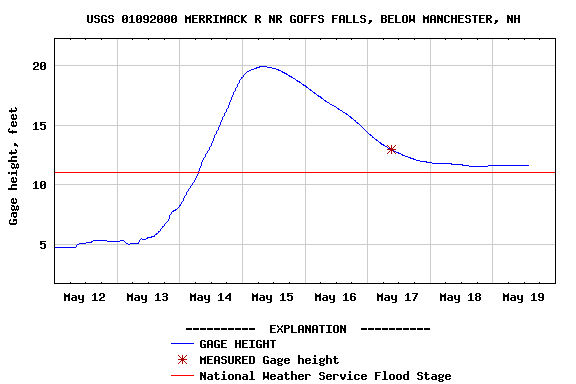
Merrimack River (Goffs Falls) Gage, Manchester, NH

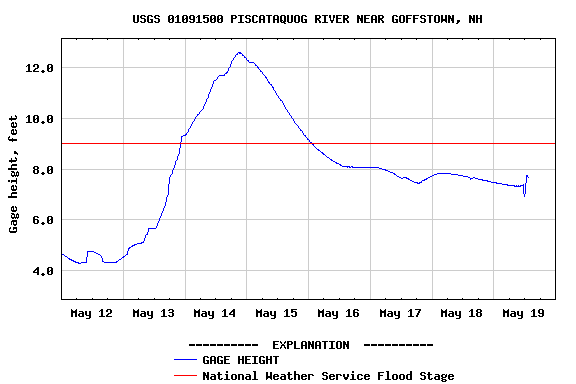
Piscataquog River Dam Gage, Goffstown, NH

The most serious flooding in New Hampshire was along the Merrimack River. Dozens of homes were flooded, especially in Manchester where the Merrimack was 10 feet (3 m) above flood stage. Electricity was cut along several sections of the river, and flooding was reported in Concord, Merrimack, Hooksett, Fremont and Raymond among other communities. At least 600 roads were closed due to flooding. Flooding of the Turkey River also caused St. Paul's School in Concord to be closed.

There were serious concerns along the Salmon Falls River in Milton, where a dam was dangerously close to failing and causing extreme flooding downstream. Several other dams, including the Newmarket Dam on the Lamprey River, were also being watched, with local residents being evacuated downstream. The Suncook River, responding to the highest rainfall amounts in at least 70 years (more than 8 inches (200 mm) dropped by the system in three days on Concord), rose to flood level and backed up behind an old mill dam, which produced a shallowly-sloping pool that overtopped a sand and gravel quarry, connected with a downstream section of channel, and cut a new shorter channel at 25–50 meters per hour in the town of Epsom. Two previous channels, around Bear Island, were left dry. The new river course, approximately a mile long, is the largest channel change in a river in New Hampshire since systematic topographic mapping began in the state in the early 20th century.

In addition, at least 550 National Guard troops were deployed in the state. Damage in New Hampshire was estimated to be well into the tens of millions of dollars.
