= Turki =

Turki may refer to:

== Languages ==
- Azerbaijani language, known as Türki for its speakers in Iran
- Chagatai language, also known as Turki
- Ili Turki language
- Old Anatolian Turkish, also known as Türki
- Old Tatar, also known as Volga Turki
- Ottoman Turkish, also known as Türkî
- Uyghur language, formerly known as Eastern Turki
- Uzbek language, formerly known as Western Turki
- Qashqai language, known as Turki to its speakers
- Karakhanid language, known as Türki

== Others ==
- Turki (name), a first or a last name
- Turki (urban-type settlement), a work settlement in Saratov Oblast, Russia

== See also ==
- Turky (disambiguation)
- Turke (disambiguation)
- Turkey (disambiguation)
- Turkiye (disambiguation)
- Turkish (disambiguation)
- Turkic (disambiguation)
