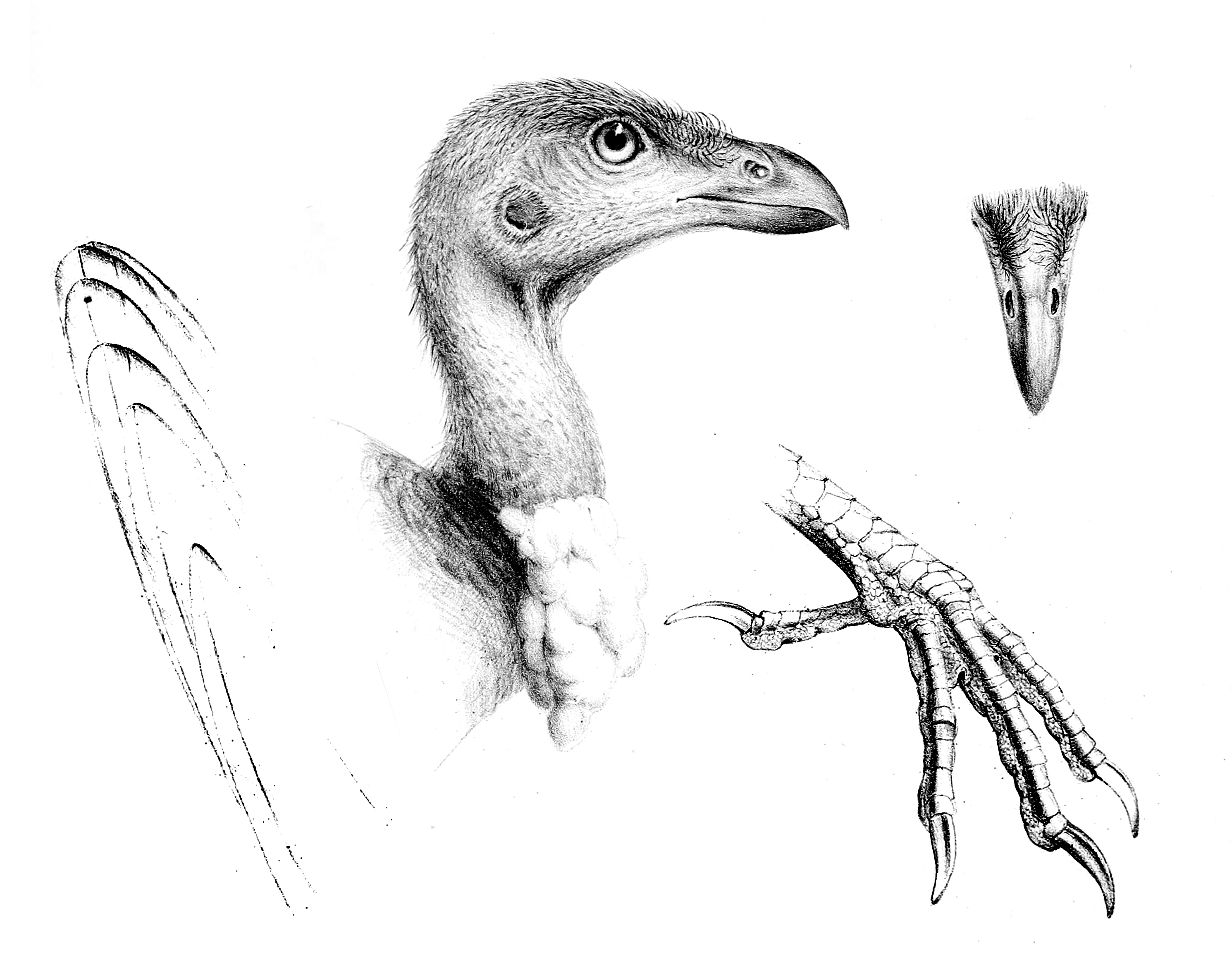

Scientific classification
- Kingdom: Animalia
- Phylum: Chordata
- Class: Aves
- Order: Galliformes
- Family: Megapodiidae
- Genus: Talegalla; Lesson, 1828

Type species
- Talegalla cuvieri Lesson, 1828

Species
- See text

= Talegalla =

Genus of birds

Talegalla is a genus of bird in the family Megapodiidae. First described by René Primevère Lesson in 1828, it contains the following three species:

Image	Scientific name	Common name	Distribution
	Talegalla cuvieri	Red-billed brushturkey	Lowland forests on Vogelkop Peninsula, western Snow Mountains, and Misool Island of West Papua.
	Talegalla fuscirostris	Black-billed brushturkey	Aru Islands and New Guinea.
	Talegalla jobiensis	Collared brushturkey	Northern part of New Guinea.

The name Talegalla is a combination of taleve, the French word for swamphen, and gallus, the Latin word for "cock". Lesson wrote that he created the word to hint at the unusual appearance of the red-billed brushturkey, which somewhat resembles a swamphen but is the size of a chicken.
