= Red-billed brushturkey =

Conservation status
- Least Concern (IUCN 3.1)

Scientific classification
- Kingdom: Animalia
- Phylum: Chordata
- Class: Aves
- Order: Galliformes
- Family: Megapodiidae
- Genus: Talegalla
- Species: T. cuvieri

Binomial name
- Talegalla cuvieri Lesson, 1828

Subspecies
- T. c. granti (Roselaar, 1994); T. c. cuvieri (Lesson, 1828)

Species of bird

The red-billed brushturkey (Talegalla cuvieri) also known as red-billed talegalla or Cuvier's brushturkey, is a large, up to 57 cm long, black megapode with bare yellow facial skin, a reddish orange bill, yellow iris, and orange feet. The head is covered with bristle-like black feathers. The sexes are similar.

An Indonesian endemic, the Red-billed Brushturkey inhabits to lowland forests on Vogelkop Peninsula, western Snow Mountains, and Misool Island of West Papua. It builds nest mound from sticks and leaves.

The scientific name commemorates the French zoologist Frédéric Cuvier.

The red-billed brushturkey is evaluated as Least Concern on the IUCN Red List of Threatened Species.
