= Turkey Island =

Turkey Island may refer to:

- Turkey Island (James River), an island in the James River in the United States
- Turkey Island (Maryland), an island in the Potomac River in the United States
- Turkey Island (Ontario), an island in the Detroit River in Canada
- Turkey Island, West Sussex, a place in West Sussex in England
- Turkey Island, Hampshire, a place in Hampshire in England
- Turkey Island, Australia, an island between mainland Australia and Fraser Island. 25°30'08.4"S 152°55'38.7"E.
