= Turkey Ponds =

Ponds in New Hampshire, United States

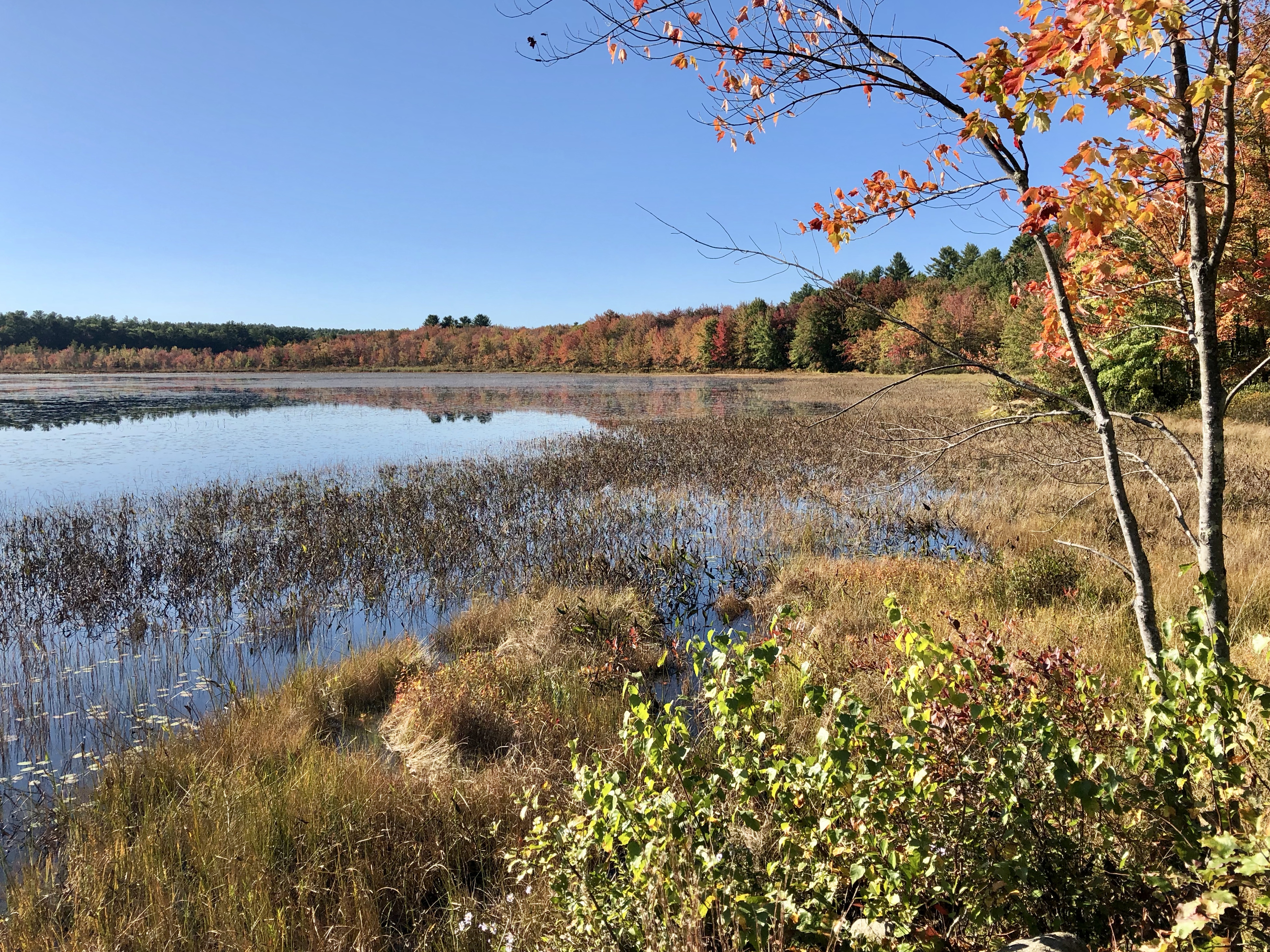
- Turkey Pond in October 2019

- Location within New Hampshire Location within the United States
- Location: Merrimack County, New Hampshire
- Coordinates: 43°10′31″N 71°35′6″W
- Primary inflows: Turee Brook; Bela Brook; Ash Brook
- Primary outflows: Turkey River
- Basin countries: United States
- Max. length: 2.5 mi (4.0 km)
- Max. width: 0.5 mi (0.80 km)
- Surface area: 332 acres (134 ha)
- Average depth: 3 ft (0.91 m)
- Max. depth: 15 ft (4.6 m)
- Surface elevation: 325 ft (99 m)
- Settlements: Concord

Turkey Pond and Little Turkey Pond are a connected pair of water bodies located in Merrimack County in central New Hampshire, United States, in the city of Concord. The two ponds' elevations are controlled by a single dam at the outlet of Little Turkey Pond. The combined surface area of the two ponds is 332 acres (1.34 km^{2}). The channel between the two ponds serves as the water course for the crew team for Saint Paul's School of Concord. Water from the Turkey Ponds flows via the Turkey River to the Merrimack River.

The lake is classified as a warmwater fishery, with observed species including largemouth bass, chain pickerel, and horned pout.

Following the 1938 New England hurricane, Turkey Pond was used to hold salvaged logs, which were then processed at an on-site sawmill; it was staffed by women during World War II.

== See also ==
- List of lakes in New Hampshire
- New Hampshire Historical Marker No. 184: Turkey Pond – 1938 Hurricane
