= Turkey, South Africa =

Turkey
- Location within Limpopo Location within South Africa
- Coordinates: 24.315°S 30.504°E
- Country: South Africa
- Province: Limpopo
- District: Mopani
- Municipality: Maruleng

Area
  - Total: 9.63 km^{2} (3.72 sq mi)

Population (2011)
  - Total: 7,597
  - Density: 789/km^{2} (2,040/sq mi)

Racial makeup (2011)
  - Black African: 99.8%
  - Indian/Asian: 0.1%

First languages (2011)
  - Northern Sotho: 96.5%
  - Other: 3.5%
- Time zone: UTC+2 (SAST)
- PO box: 0893

Turkey is a town in the Mopani District Municipality, located in the Limpopo province of South Africa.
