= Bush turkey =

Bush turkey may refer to:

- The Australian brushturkey, a mound-building bird from the family Megapodiidae found in eastern Australia
- The Australian bustard
- The orange-footed scrubfowl

== See also ==
- Brushturkey
