= Turkic nationalism =

Turkic nationalism may refer to:

- Turkish nationalism
- Pan-Turkism
- Turanism
