= Tuckey =

Tuckey is an English surname. Notable people with the surname include:

- Agnes Tuckey (1877–1972), English tennis player
- Brent Tuckey (born 1979), Australian footballer
- Charles Lloyd Tuckey (1854–1925), English physician
- Dick Tuckey (1913–1974), American football player
- Hobart Tuckey (1884–1951), Australian politician
- James Hingston Tuckey (1776–1816), British explorer and navy captain
- Jim Tuckey (1899–1997), Australian rugby footballer
- Kay Tuckey (c. 1921–2016), English tennis player
- Len Tuckey (born 1945), English musician
- Raymond Tuckey (1910–2005), English tennis player
- Tom Tuckey (1884–1950), American baseball player
- William Tuckey (1708–1781), English-American composer
- Wilson Tuckey (born 1935), Australian politician
