= Turkey River (New Hampshire) =

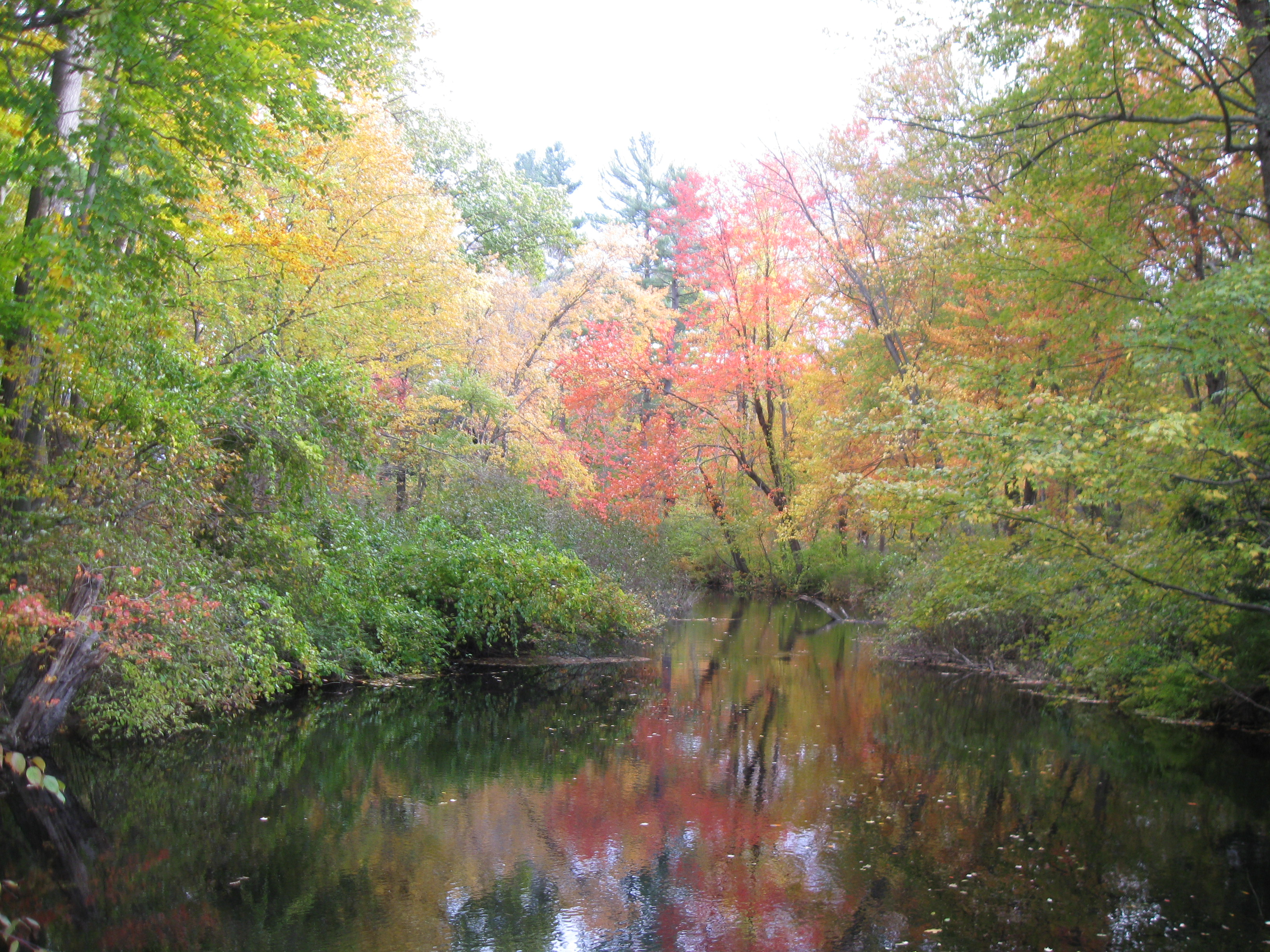
- The Turkey River near St. Paul's School

- Location within New Hampshire Location within the United States

Location
- Country: United States
- State: New Hampshire
- County: Merrimack
- City and town: Concord, Bow

Physical characteristics
- Source: Little Turkey Pond
  - location: Concord
  - coordinates: 43°11′36″N 71°35′20″W
  - elevation: 325 ft (99 m)
- Mouth: Merrimack River
  - location: Bow
  - coordinates: 43°10′9″N 71°31′27″W
  - elevation: 225 ft (69 m)
- Length: 6.1 mi (9.8 km)

Basin features
- Tributaries
  - left: Bow Brook

The Turkey River is a 6.1-mile-long (9.8 km) stream located in southern New Hampshire in the United States. It is a tributary of the Merrimack River, which flows to the Gulf of Maine.

The source of the Turkey River is the outlet of Little Turkey Pond in Concord, New Hampshire. The river travels southeast through the campus of St. Paul's School, winding through the outskirts of Concord, and entering Bow before being joined by Bow Brook, and then joining the Merrimack just past the junction of Interstate 93 and Interstate 89. In May 2006 record amounts of rainfall over two days caused the Turkey River to flood the campus of St. Paul's School, forcing the school year to be ended prematurely.

== Gallery ==
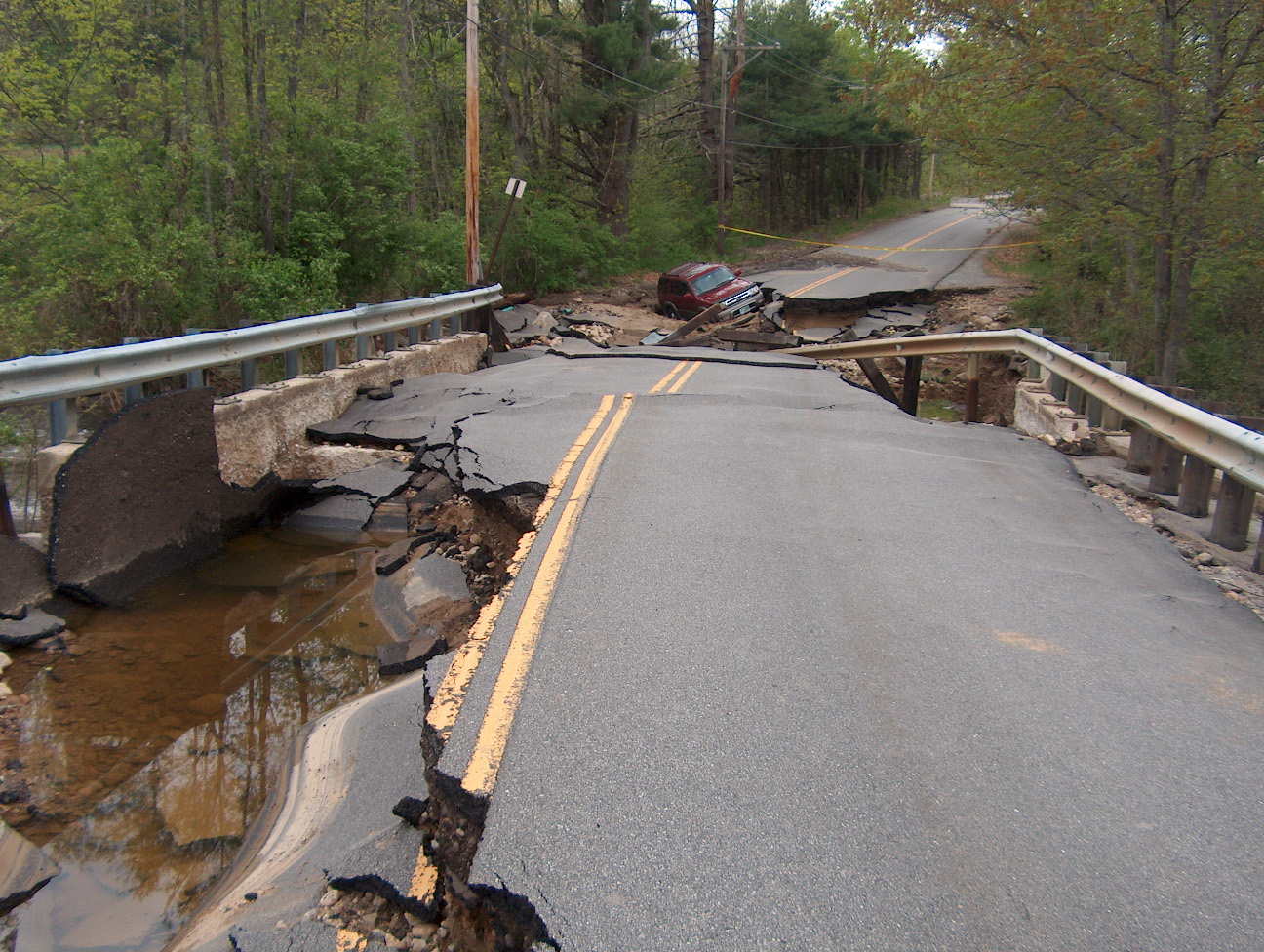
A road crossing the river following the 2006 New England flood

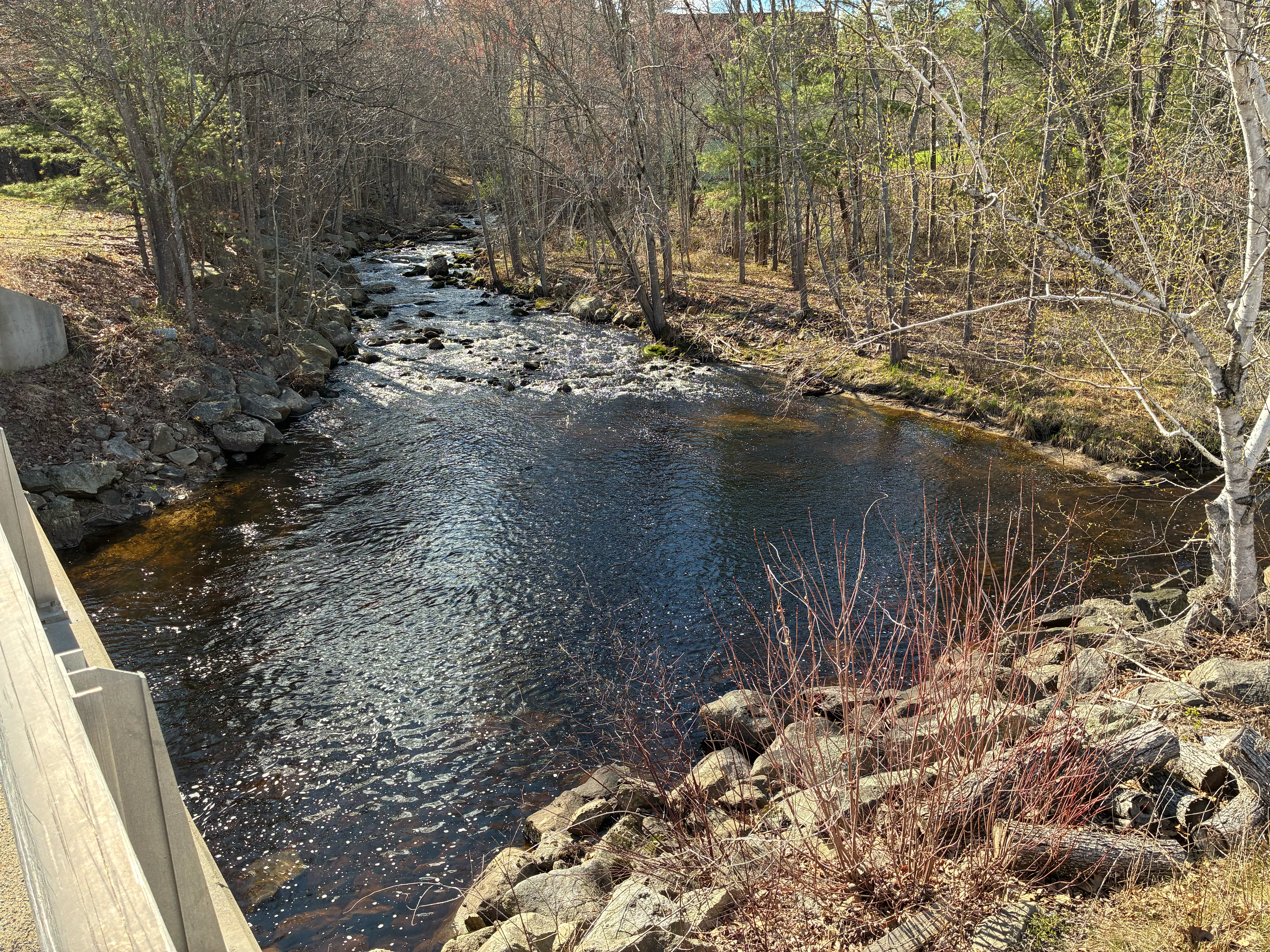
View from the end of the exit 1 exit ramp from Interstate 89 in Bow, New Hampshire

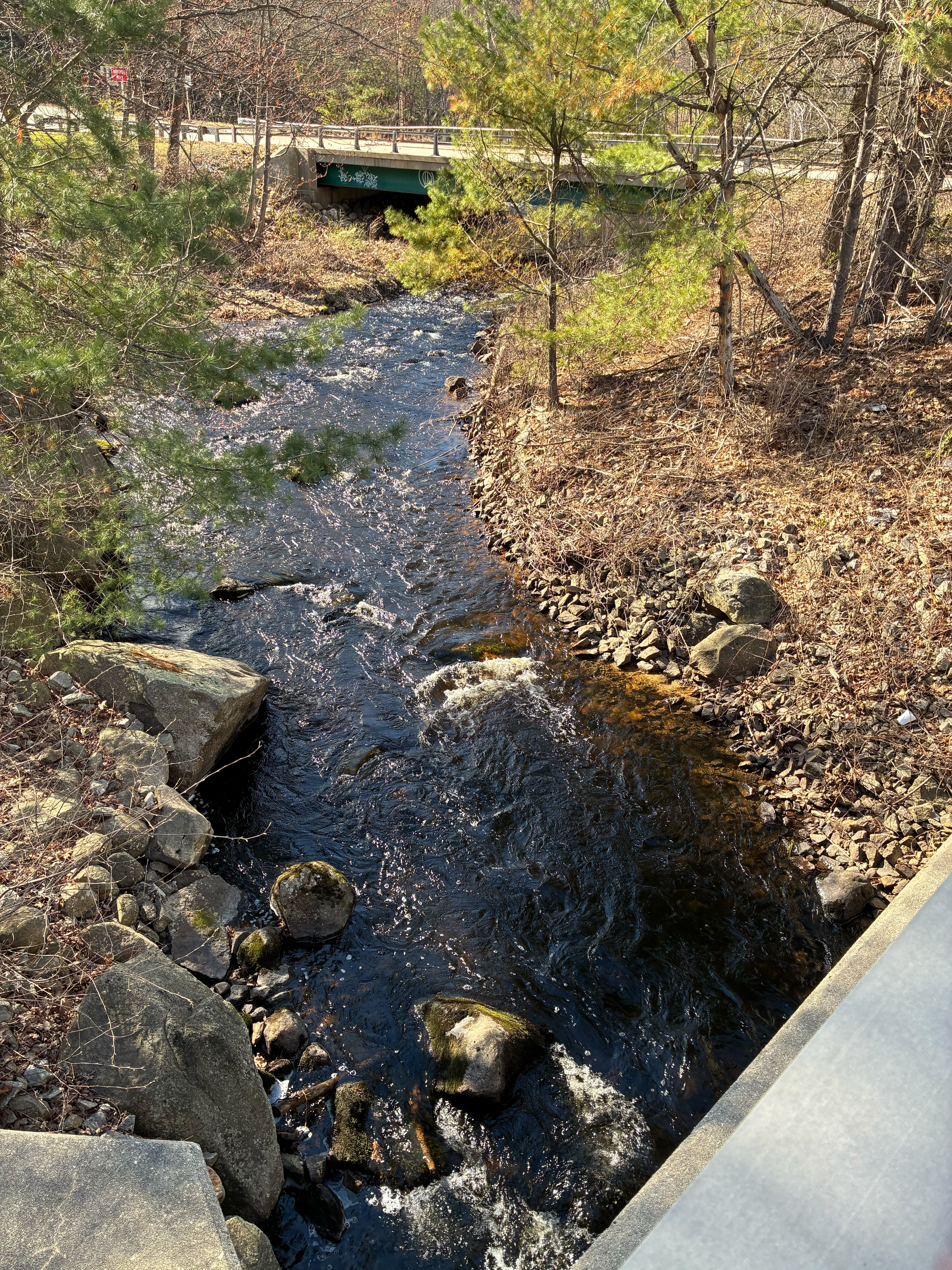
A little bit downstream, between the exit ramp and cross street onto which the exit ramp exits

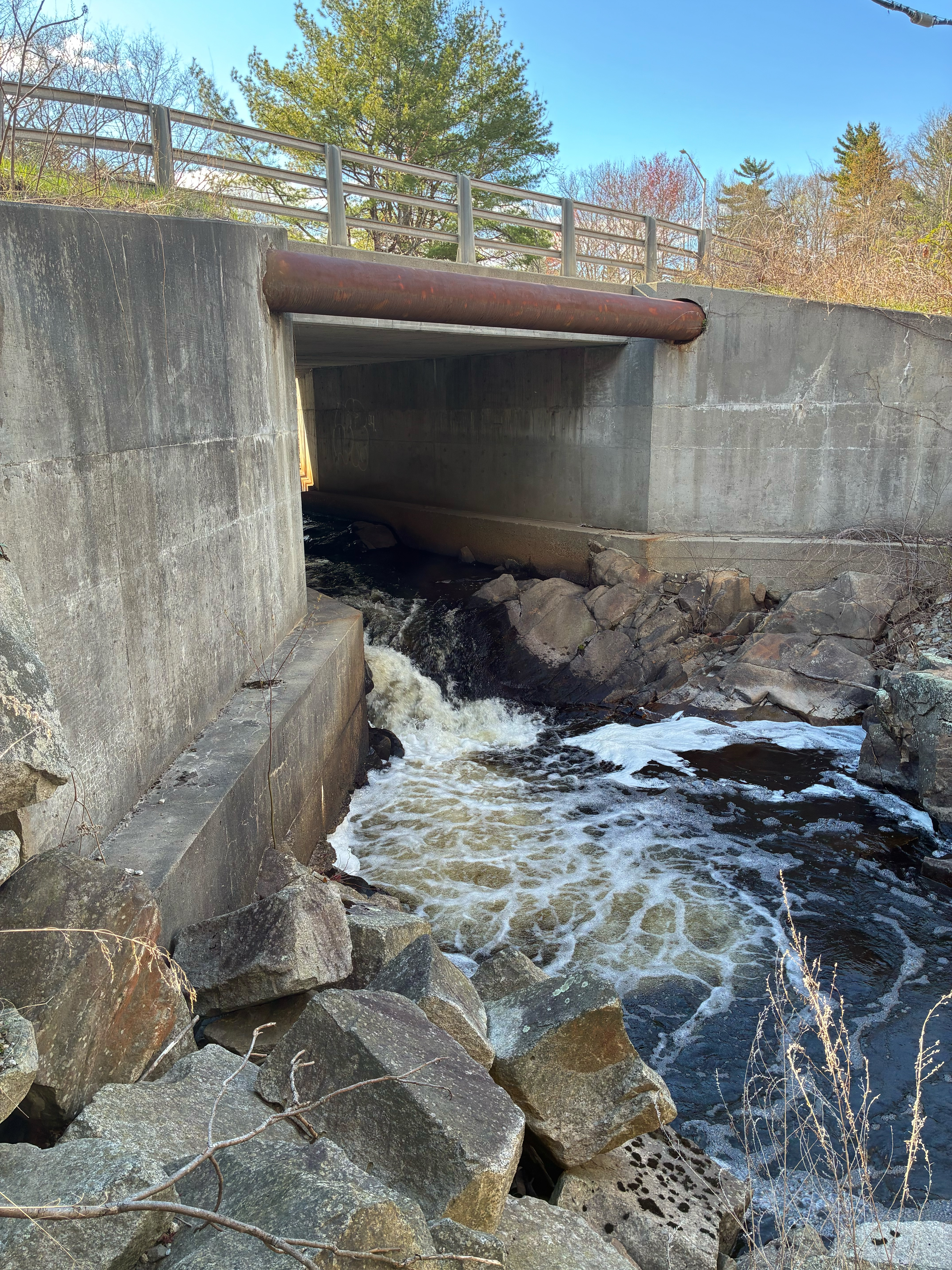
There is a waterfall on the river under the bridge at that cross street

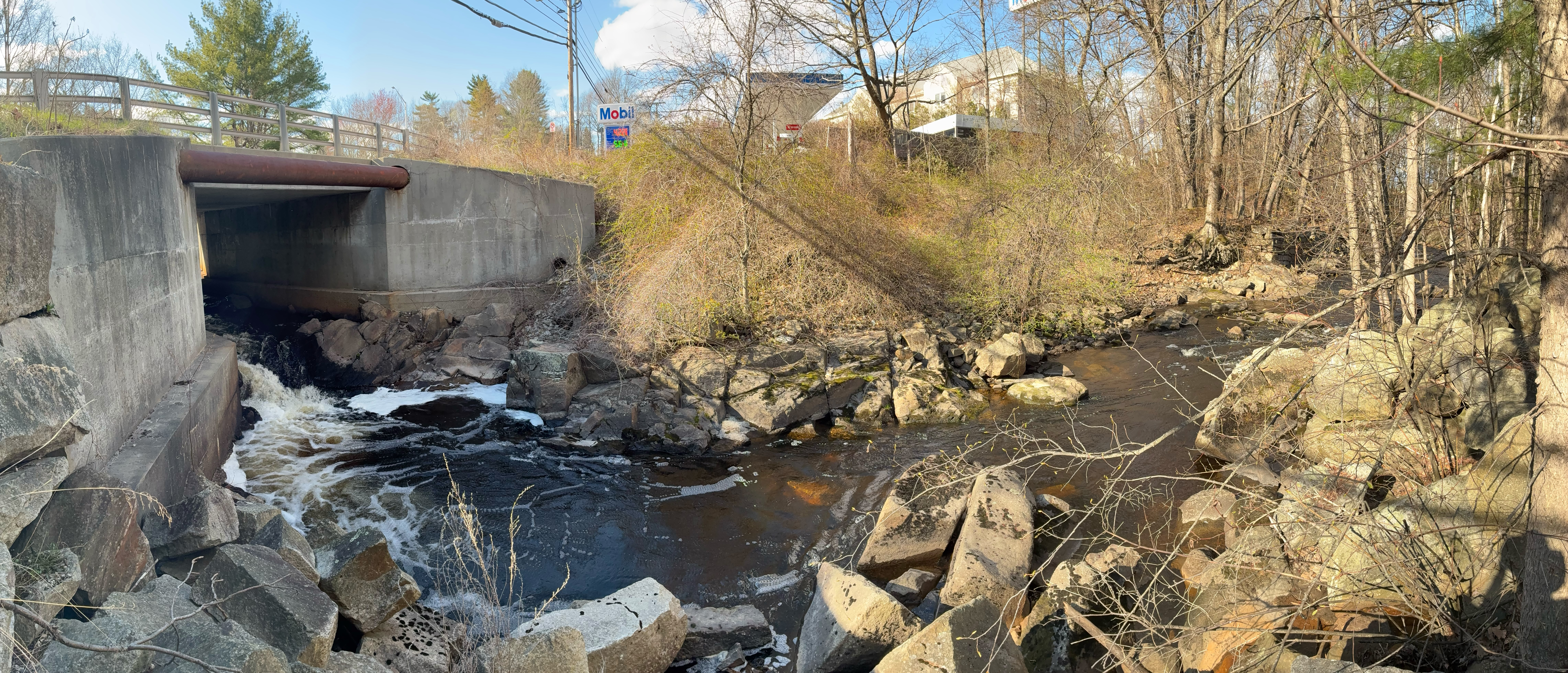
A panorama view downstream from the falls on the river

== See also ==
- List of rivers of New Hampshire
