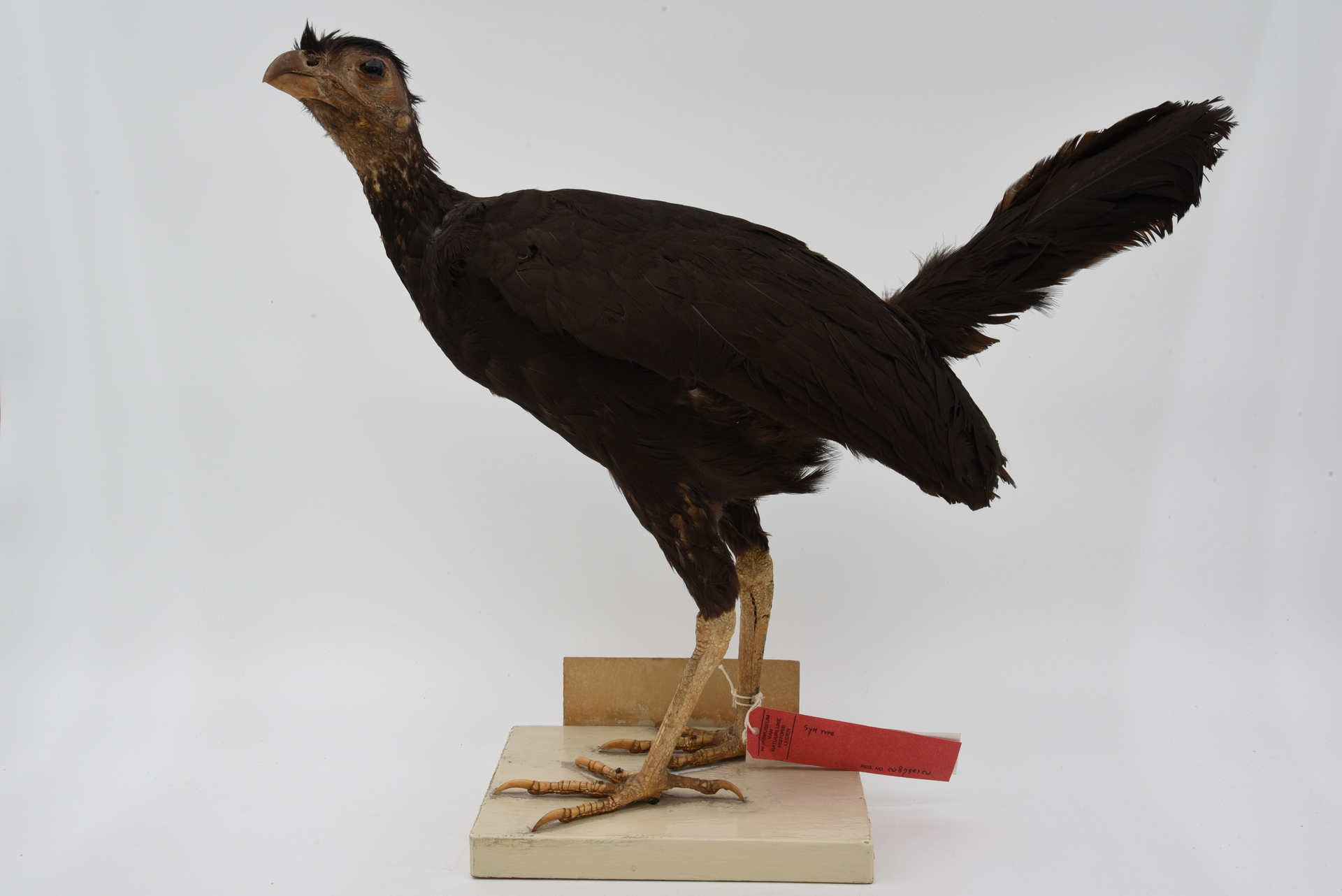

Conservation status
- Least Concern (IUCN 3.1)

Scientific classification
- Kingdom: Animalia
- Phylum: Chordata
- Class: Aves
- Order: Galliformes
- Family: Megapodiidae
- Genus: Talegalla
- Species: T. jobiensis

Binomial name
- Talegalla jobiensis Meyer, 1874

Subspecies
- Talegalla jobiensis longicaudus (Meyer, 1891); Talegalla jobiensis jobiensis (Meyer, 1874)

= Collared brushturkey =

Species of bird

The collared brushturkey, brown-collared brushturkey, or red-legged brushturkey (Talegalla jobiensis) is a species of bird in the family Megapodiidae. It is found in the northern part of New Guinea. Its natural habitats are subtropical or tropical moist lowland forest and subtropical or tropical moist montane forest.

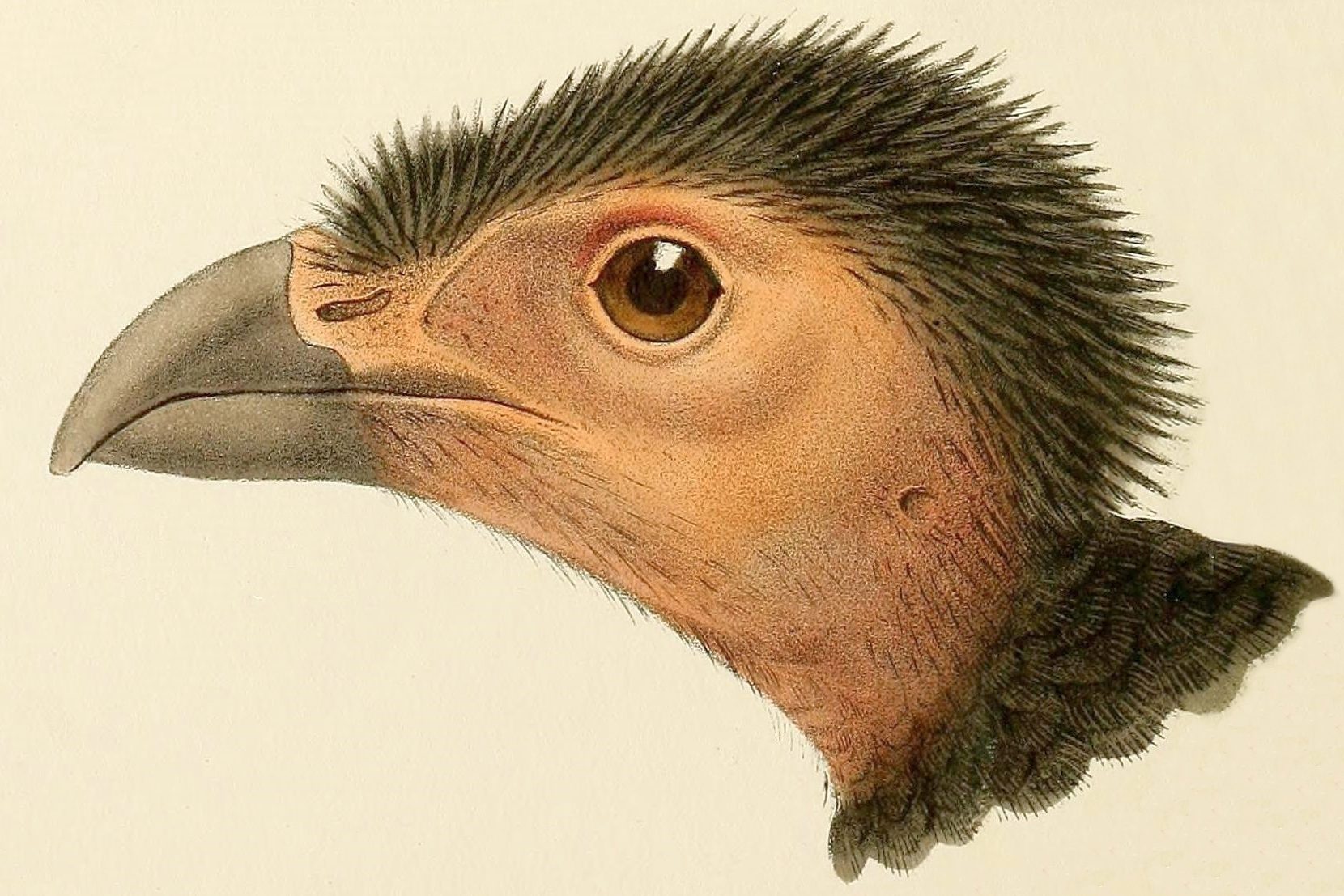
Head of the collared brushturkey
