= Turki Faisal Al Rasheed =

Saudi Arabian businessman

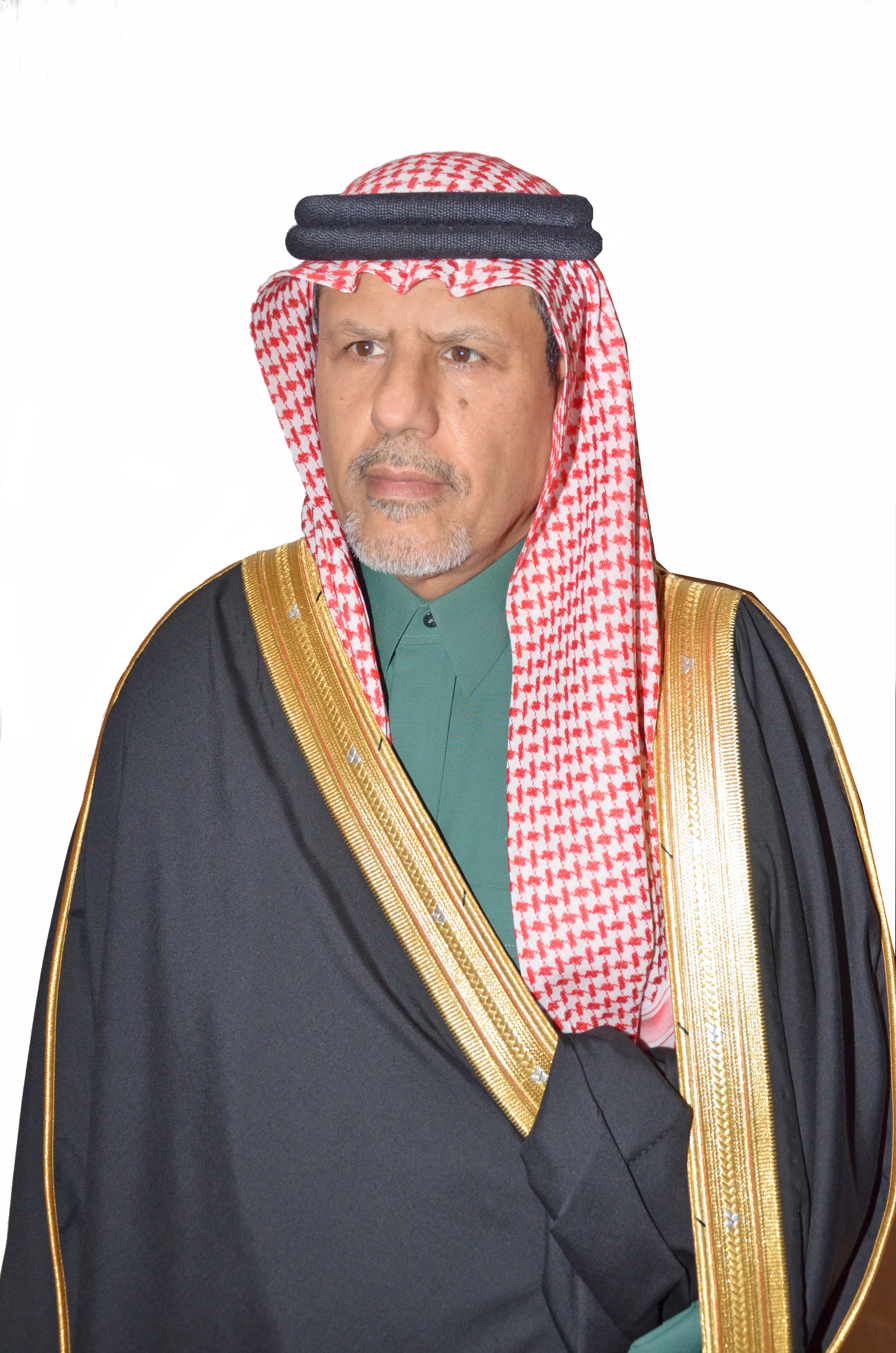
- Turki Faisal Al-Rasheed (Arabic: تركي فيصل الرشيد)
- Born: 5 August 1954 (age 72); Makkah
- Occupations: Chairman, golden grass, inc.
- Spouse: Mashael Muteb Abdullah Al Rasheed
- Website: www.tfrasheed.org/e

Dr. Turki Faisal Al-Rasheed (born 5 August 1954) (Arabic: تركي فيصل الرشيد) is a Saudi businessman. He is the chair and the Founder of Golden Grass Incorporated in Riyadh.

He leads the Saudi Voter Center, an internet-based website which encourages Saudi nationals to become involved in Saudi Arabia's non-democratic elections. He is adjunct professor at the Department of Biosystems Engineering, College of Agriculture and Life Sciences at the University of Arizona, Tucson.

== Early life and education ==
Turki Faisal Al-Rasheed is a descendant of Ibn Rashid family, the ruler of Hail, a clan of the Shammar Tribe. His father was one of the handful of the Ibn Rashid family who walk out the last out of the Barzan Palace on 2 November 1921.

He earned his degree in Executive Doctor of Business Administration (EDBA) at Liverpool Business School (LJMU), U.K. His Executive Master in Business Administration (EMBA) at college of Industrial Management at King Fahd University for Petroleum and Minerals (KFUPM), Saudi Arabia and Bachelor of Science in Agriculture Engineering at the University of Arizona, Tucson.

== Career ==
He is a board member of the National Agriculture Development Company (NADEC), an Agriculture Committee of the Riyadh Chamber of Commerce, and the President and Chairman of Turki Faisal International Corporation (TFIC), from 1981 to present. Adjunct Professor at the College of Agriculture, Life and Environmental Sciences (CALES), Department of Agricultural and Biosystems engineering, University of Arizona, Tucson, AZ, USA. Advisor to Environment and Sustainable Development (ESDU), Faculty of Agricultural and Food Sciences (FAFS) at the American University of Beirut (AUB), Lebanon.

== See also ==
- House of Saud
- Rashidi dynasty
