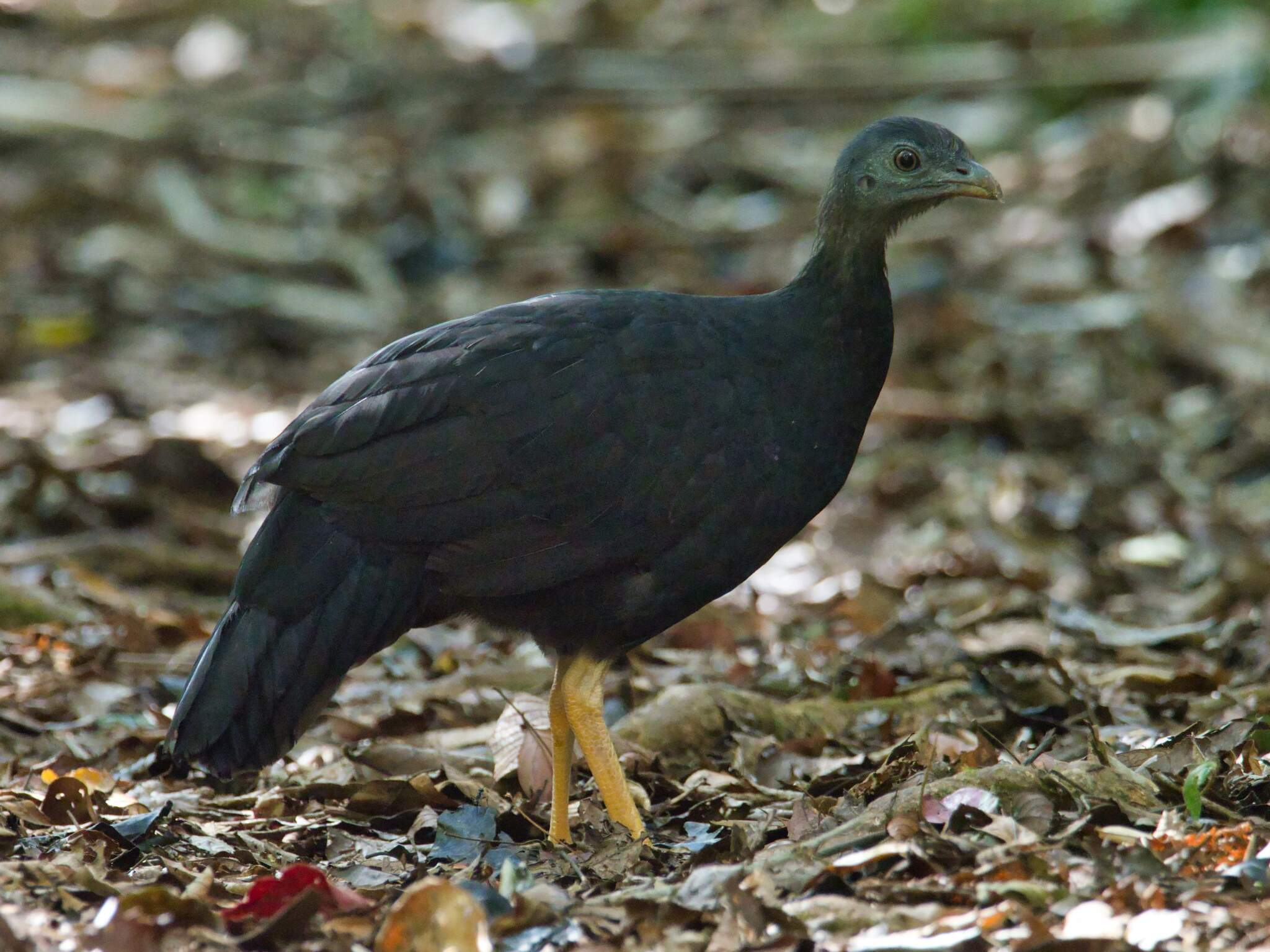

Conservation status
- Least Concern (IUCN 3.1)

Scientific classification
- Kingdom: Animalia
- Phylum: Chordata
- Class: Aves
- Order: Galliformes
- Family: Megapodiidae
- Genus: Talegalla
- Species: T. fuscirostris

Binomial name
- Talegalla fuscirostris Salvadori, 1877

Subspecies
- T. f. aruensis (Roselaar, 1994); Talegalla fuscirostris meyeri (Roselaar, 1994); Talegalla fuscirostris fuscirostris (Salvadori, 1877); Talegalla fuscirostris occidentis (CMN White, 1938)

= Black-billed brushturkey =

Species of bird

The black-billed brushturkey, yellow-legged brushturkey or black-billed talegalla (Talegalla fuscirostris) is a species of bird in the family Megapodiidae. It is found in the Aru Islands and New Guinea. Its natural habitat is subtropical or tropical moist lowland forest.

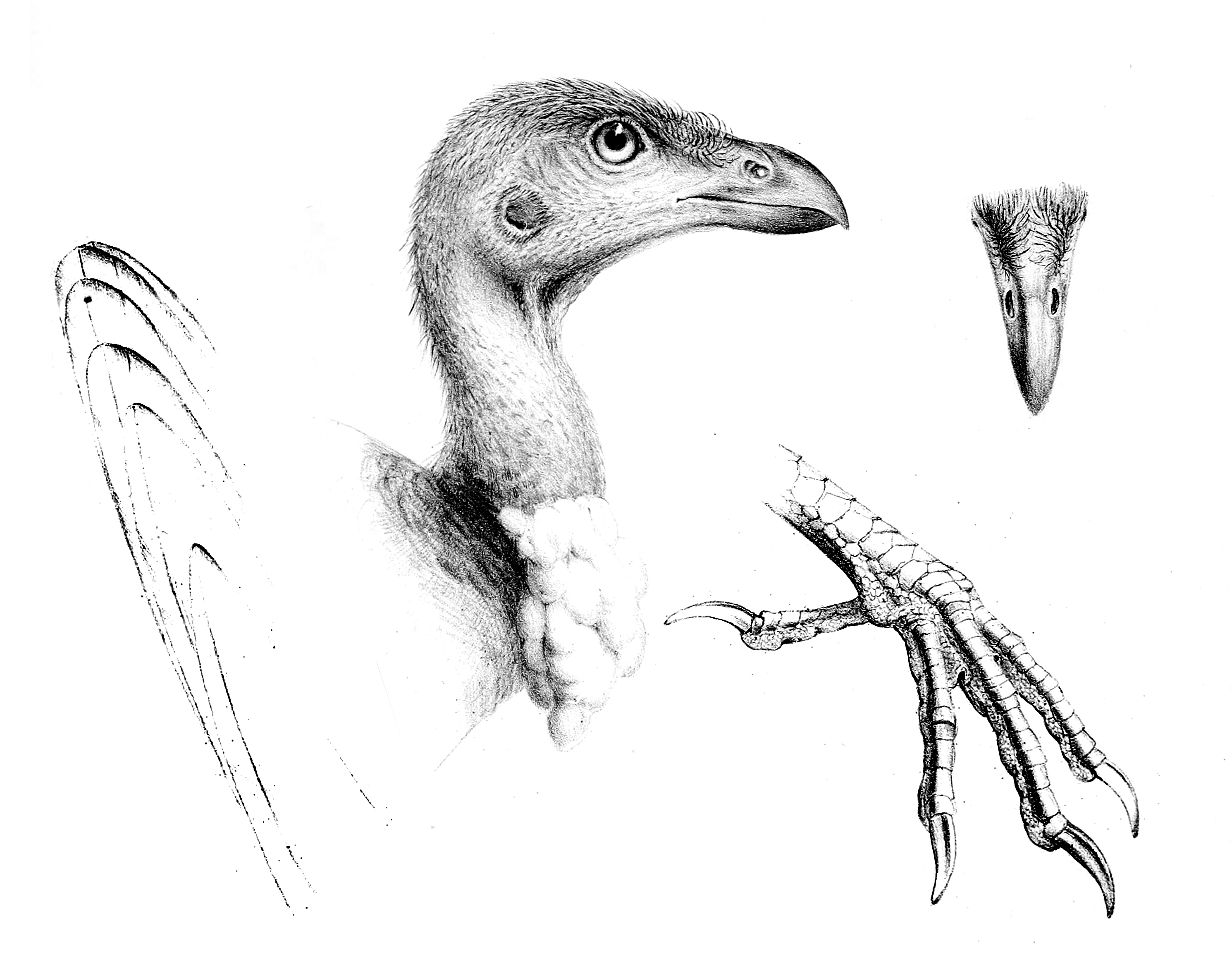
Anatomy of the black-billed brushturkey
