= Turkey Mountain (Georgia) =

Mountain in Georgia, United States

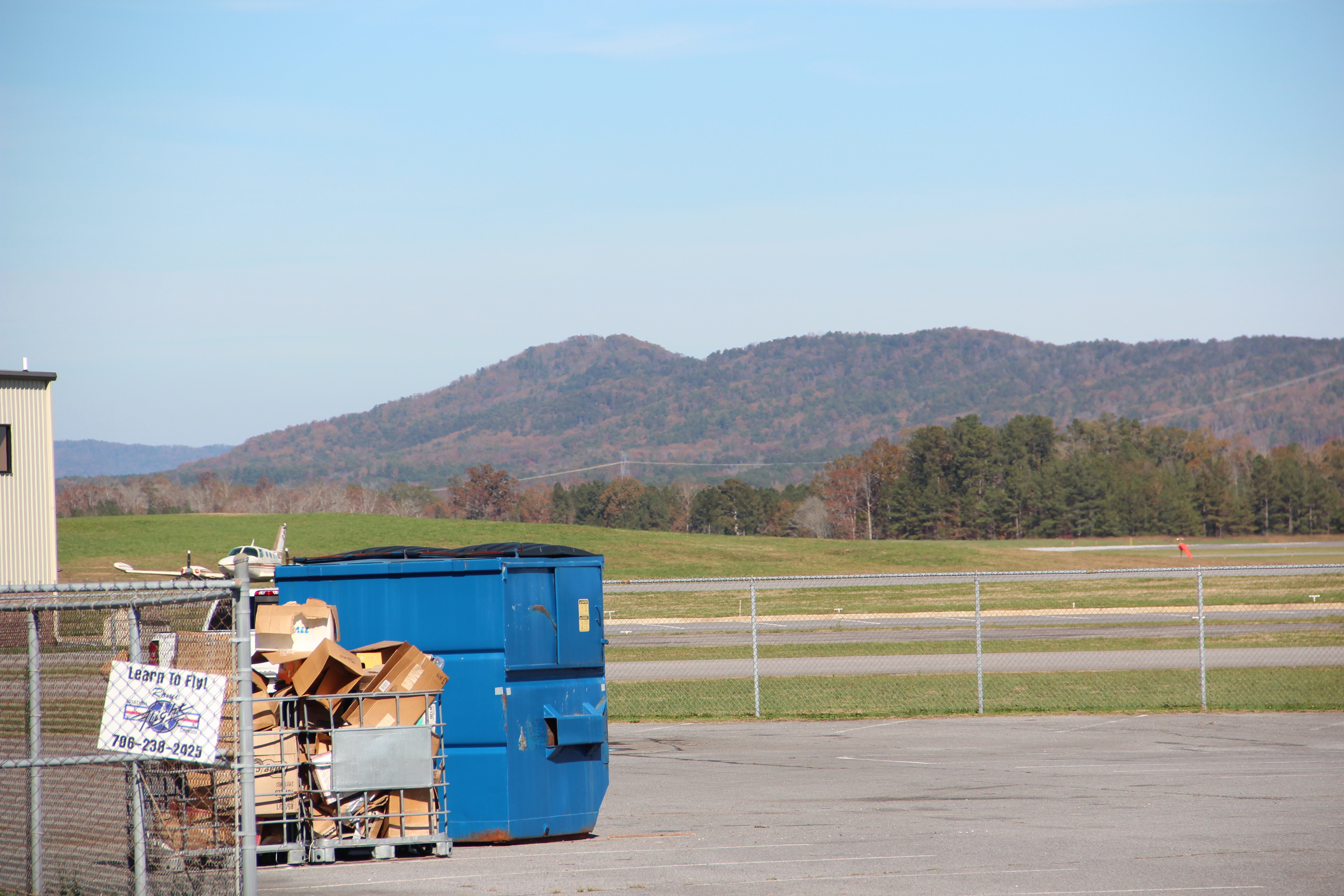
- Turkey Mountain viewed from Richard B. Russell Airport

Highest point
- Elevation: 1,122 ft (342 m)
- Coordinates: 34.414796°N 85.123562°W

Geography
- Country: United States
- State: Georgia
- County: Floyd County

Turkey Mountain is a summit in Floyd County, Georgia. With an elevation of 1,122 feet (342 m), Turkey Mountain is the 808th highest summit in the state of Georgia.

"Turkey" could be named after an individual American Indian or the bird.
