= Turkey (nickname) =

Turkey is a nickname of:

- Mike Donlin (1878–1933), American baseball player and actor
- Turkey Gross (1896–1936), American baseball player and manager
- Joe Jones (defensive end) (born 1948), American former National Football League player
- Adrian Mannix (born 1988), Irish hurler
- Turkey Smart (1830–1919), British champion speed skater
- Turkey Stearnes (1901–1979), American baseball player in the Negro leagues
- Turkey Tolson Tjupurrula (c. 1938–2001), Australian Indigenous artist
- Turkey Tayac (1895–1978), American Indian leader and herbal doctor
- Little Turkey (1758–1801), Cherokee leader
