= Turkish bath (disambiguation) =

Turkish bath may refer to:

- Hammam, a steam bath used for centuries throughout the Islamic world for personal cleansing and socialising.
- Victorian Turkish baths, which use hot dry air, came into use in 1856 in the British Isles as a therapy, for personal cleansing, and socialising.
- In Japan, toruko-buro 'Turkish bath' were brothels; they have been renamed soapland

== Arts and entertainment ==
- Steam: The Turkish Bath (1997), or Hamam, a film
- The Turkish Bath (1862), a painting by Jean-Auguste-Dominique Ingres

== See also ==
- Hammam (disambiguation)
