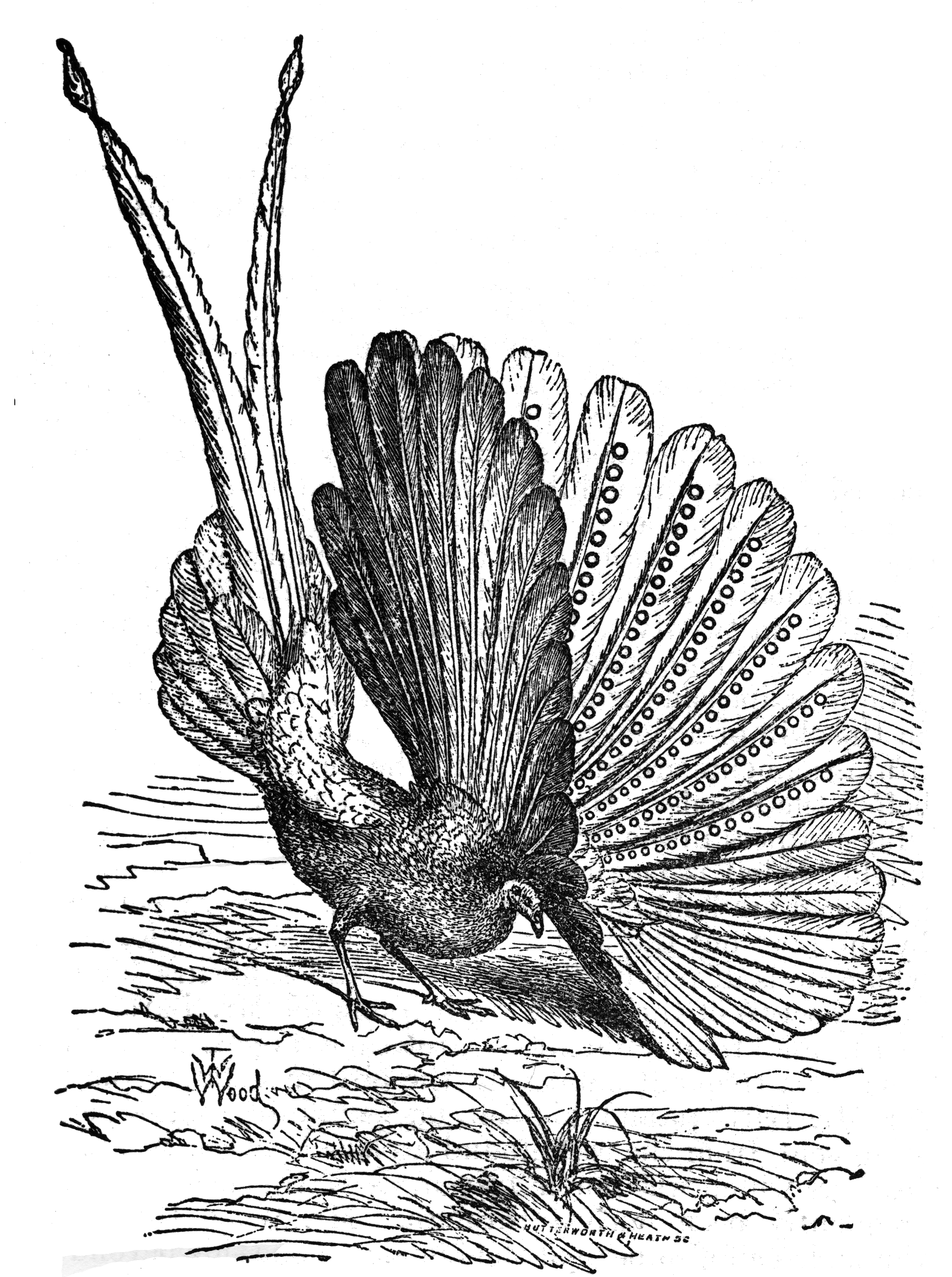
- An argus illustration from The Descent of Man, and Selection in Relation to Sex by Charles Darwin

Scientific classification
- Kingdom: Animalia
- Phylum: Chordata
- Class: Aves
- Order: Galliformes
- Family: Phasianidae
- Subfamily: Phasianinae
- Tribe: Pavonini

Groups included
- Rheinardia; Argusianus

Cladistically included but traditionally excluded taxa
- Pavo; Afropavo

= Argus (bird) =

Clade of bird

An argus, or argus pheasant, is a member of a clade in the tribe Pavonini of the family Phasianidae, containing two species of bird that are closely related to peafowl.

== Description ==
It has hundreds or thousands of tiny white spots on its plumage pattern, and thus its naming might have been in reference to the mythical hundred-eyed giant, Argus Panoptes. These birds have a body shape similar to that of a turkey, however the males have long wing and tail feathers. Males are over six feet long while females are just under three feet long. Their feathers are brown or tan, with black mottling. The Male Argus have round, eye-like circles on their feathers. Males have quite long tails, with some tails measuring nearly five feet long. Females choose males with the longest tails because it means they are the fastest and smartest of the other birds. This species of birds is primarily found in tropical regions, or places with lots of plant growth and rainfall. The Great Argus lives in Sumatra, Southeast Asia, and Borneo. In Asia, they primarily inhabit the Malaysian Peninsula, Thailand, and south Myanmar. Their population density depends on the region at hand. Populations in some areas are healthy and more common, while others are low and rare. The lifespan of the Argus in the wild is unknown, but zoos have reported the species living up to 20 years of age.

== Taxonomy ==
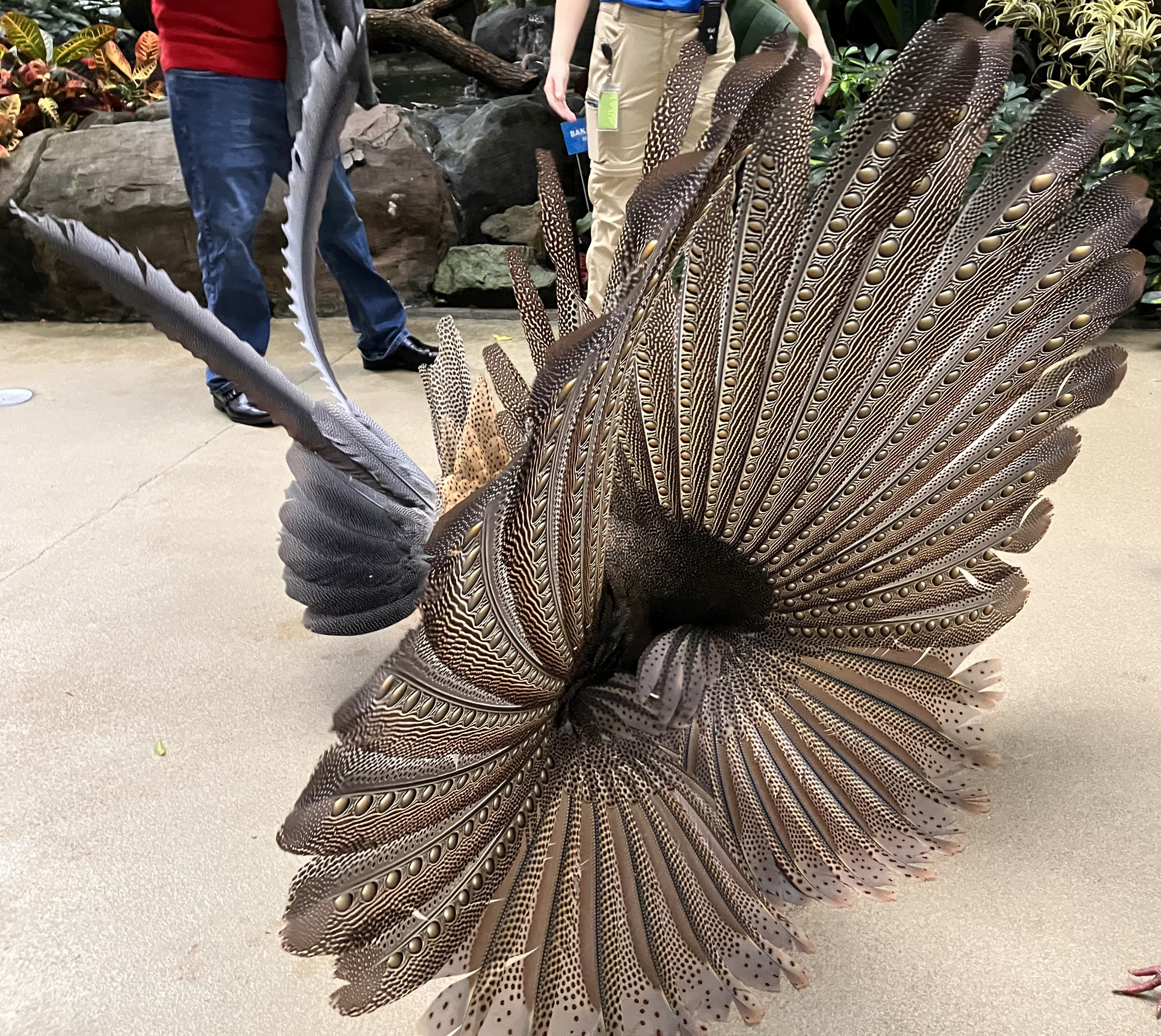
Great Argus displaying wings, National Aviary, Pittsburgh, PA

Two genera of birds are considered arguses: Rheinardia and Argusianus. Within these genera there are a total of three recognized species. Argusianus has also been credited with a mysterious second species that is sometimes thought to have gone extinct, but this is most likely based on a simple genetic aberration in the established species. Both genera are thought to be sister taxa to one another and are otherwise most closely related to the peafowl (genera Pavo and Afropavo), and slightly more distantly to the genus Tropicoperdix.

== Genus and distribution ==
- Genus Argusianus Rafinesque, 1815
  - Great argus (Argusianus argus (Linnaeus, 1766))
- Genus Rheinardia Maingonnat, 1882
  - Vietnamese crested argus (Rheinardia ocellata (Elliot, 1871))
  - Malayan crested argus (Rheinardia nigrescens (Rothschild, 1902))

== See also ==
- Great argus, Argusianus argus
