= T. W. Wood =

English zoological illustrator (1833? – 1882)

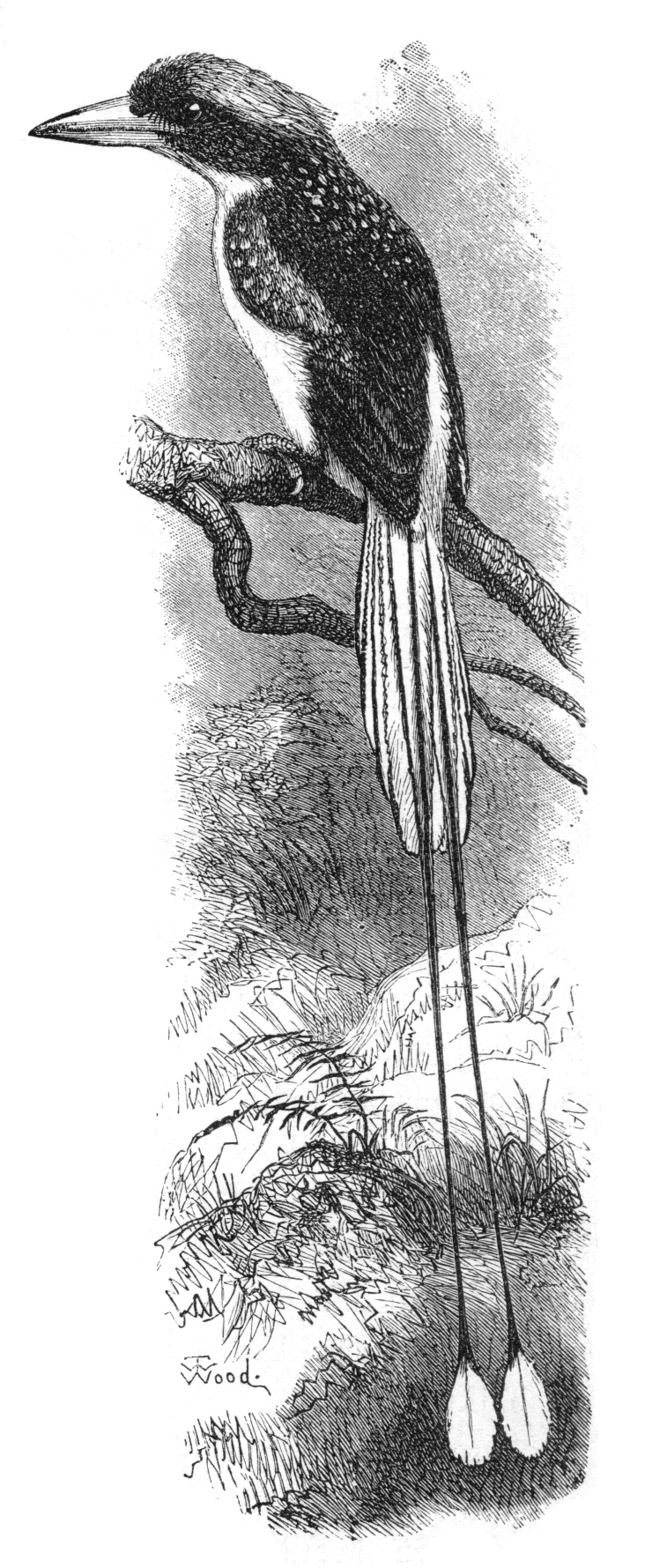
- "Racquet-tailed Kingfisher" in The Malay Archipelago
- Born: Thomas Wood; 1833; Chatham, Kent
- Died: 14 February 1882; London, England
- Known for: zoological illustration
- Notable work: Illustrations in The Malay Archipelago, The Descent of Man
- Patrons: Wallace, Darwin, Tegetmeier

Thomas William Wood (1833 – 14 February 1882) was an English zoological illustrator responsible for the accurate drawings in major nineteenth-century works of natural history including Darwin's The Descent of Man and Wallace's The Malay Archipelago. He studied the courtship display behaviour of pheasants, observing them closely and publishing the first description of the double-banded argus pheasant. He illustrated many books, often of birds but also of moths and mammals.

== Life and work ==
Wood was born in Chatham, Kent in 1833. He became a zoological illustrator, well known in the nineteenth century for his many engravings for major works of natural history including Charles Darwin's The Descent of Man (1871), Alfred Russel Wallace's The Malay Archipelago (1869), and articles by Alfred Newton in the 9th Edition of the Encyclopædia Britannica.

=== Camouflage ===
It appears that Wallace introduced Wood to Darwin, as in a letter to Darwin of 8 March 1868 Wallace writes:

Would you like to see the specimens of pupæ of butterflies whose colours have changed in accordance with the colour of the surrounding objects? They are very curious, and Mr. T. W. Wood, who bred them, would, I am sure, be delighted to bring them to show you. His address is 89 Stanhope Street, Hampstead Road, [London] N.W.

— Wallace (Note: Wood appears here to have discovered the ability of butterfly pupae to camouflage themselves, at least 20 years before Edward Bagnall Poulton's description of the same thing in his 1890 book The Colours of Animals (p. 111).)

Wood was interested in insect camouflage, and Wallace again cites him in his 1895 book Natural Selection and Tropical Nature, writing that the orangetip butterfly's underwing pattern "completely assimilates with the flower heads and renders the creature very difficult to be seen".

=== Illustration ===
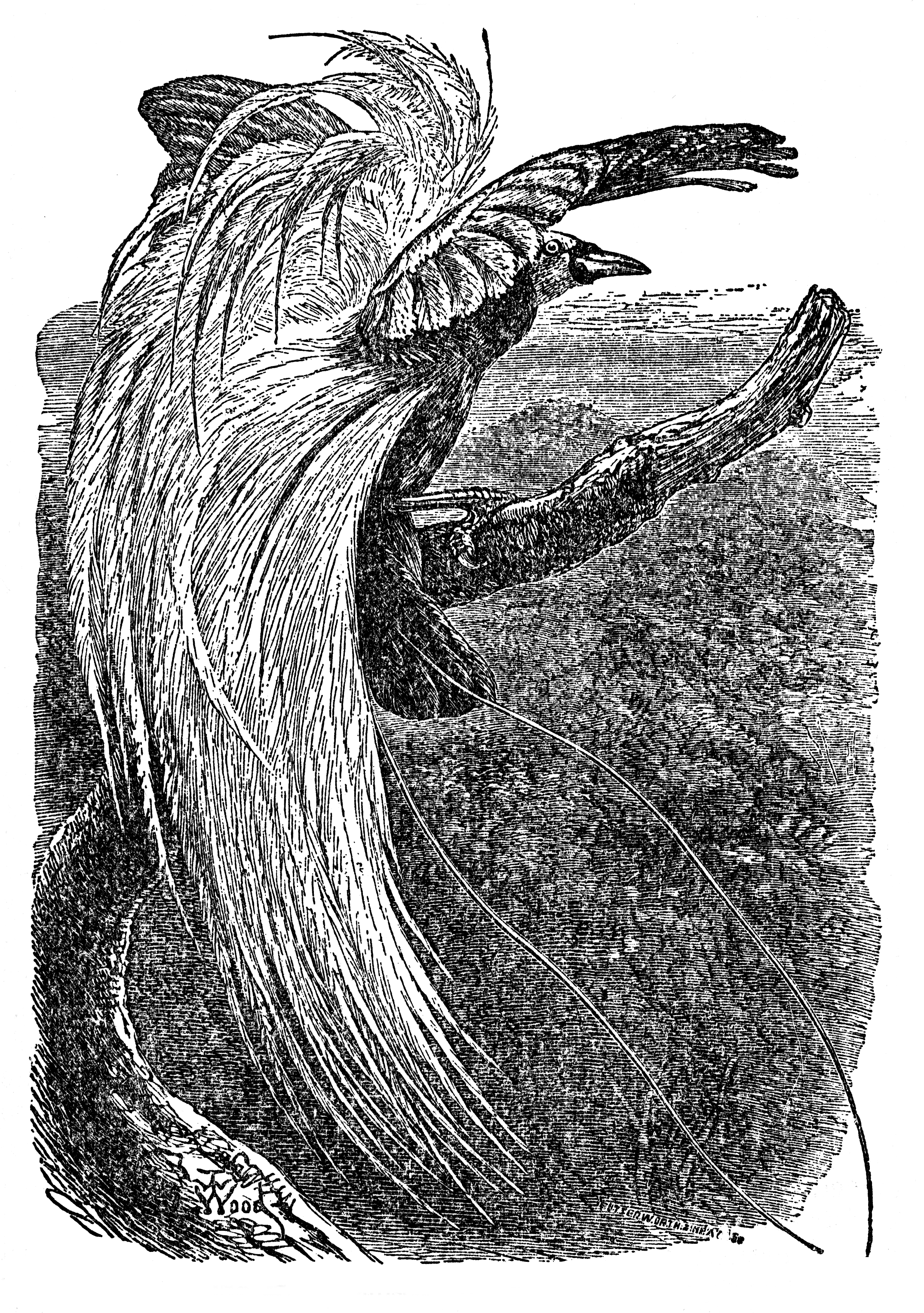
"Paradisea Papuana" (lesser bird-of-paradise) from The Descent of Man, with plumes incorrectly rising from the back

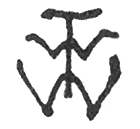
T. W. Wood's "TWW" monogram

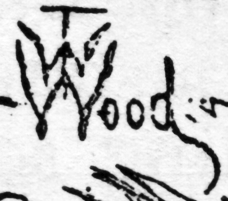
Combined monogram and signature

Wood was chosen along with other eminent Victorian era illustrators such as Joseph Wolf and Johann Baptist Zwecker for the large task of providing a set of drawings for the parson-naturalist John George Wood's Illustrated Natural History: Birds (1875). J.G. Wood (no relation), being an illustrator himself, had difficulty finding other illustrators whose work he liked; among those working on his Birds, he found Harrison Weir "always picturesque, but never correct", while T. W. Wood was the opposite, though he did like Joseph Wolf's artwork.

The English broadcaster and naturalist David Attenborough notes that in Wallace's Malay Archipelago, Wood, like earlier illustrators of the lesser bird-of-paradise, showed the male's posture wrongly, with the plumes appearing to bush out from above the wings. Attenborough observes: "It seems very odd that such an accurate and meticulous observer as Wallace did not correct him."

Many of Wood's drawings are signed with his distinctive "TWW" monogram, which he used both alone and in combination with his surname as a signature.

=== Gamebird display ===
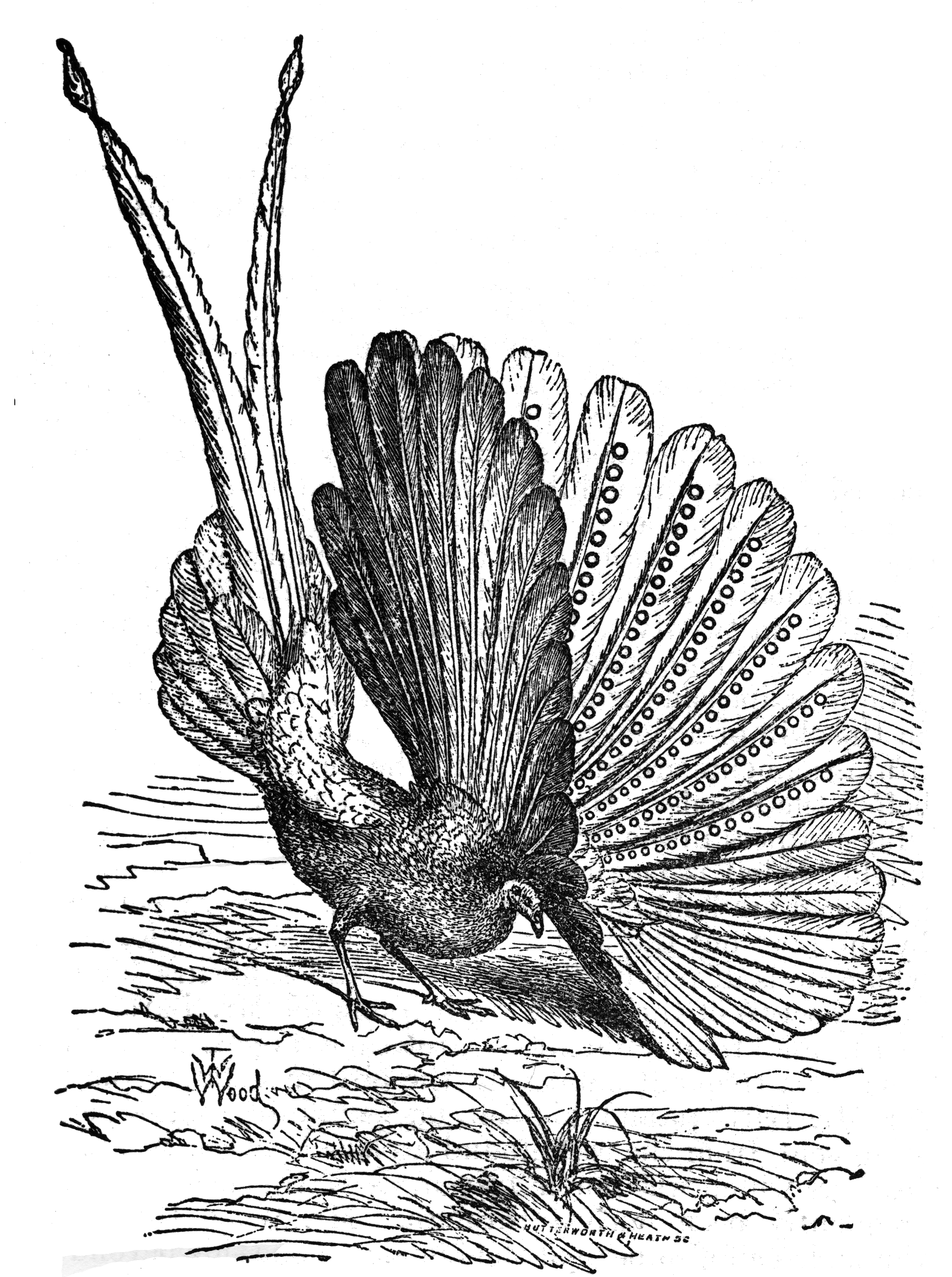
Controversial image: Argus pheasant for he Descent of Man, drawn from observations in London Zoo, that Wood told Darwin did not fit his theory

Wood became fascinated by the display plumage of male birds such as pheasants, and in 1870 he published a description of the "lateral or one-sided" display of the male gold pheasant and the "Japanese pheasant", Phasianus versicolor. Darwin commented in the second edition of his Descent of Man that "Some new illustrations have been introduced, and four of the old drawings [by Brehm] have been replaced by better ones, done from life by Mr. T. W. Wood." Wood took the trouble to ask Darwin for a copy of the book "as I should wish to know what characters were particularly pointed out in the text". One of the new drawings was a "Side view of male Argus pheasant, while displaying before the female"; Wood based the drawing on his own careful observation of the birds in the London zoological gardens, and was praised for it by William Bernhardt Tegetmeier, the natural history editor of The Field magazine, for which Wood often worked, as "the first correct delineation of the display".

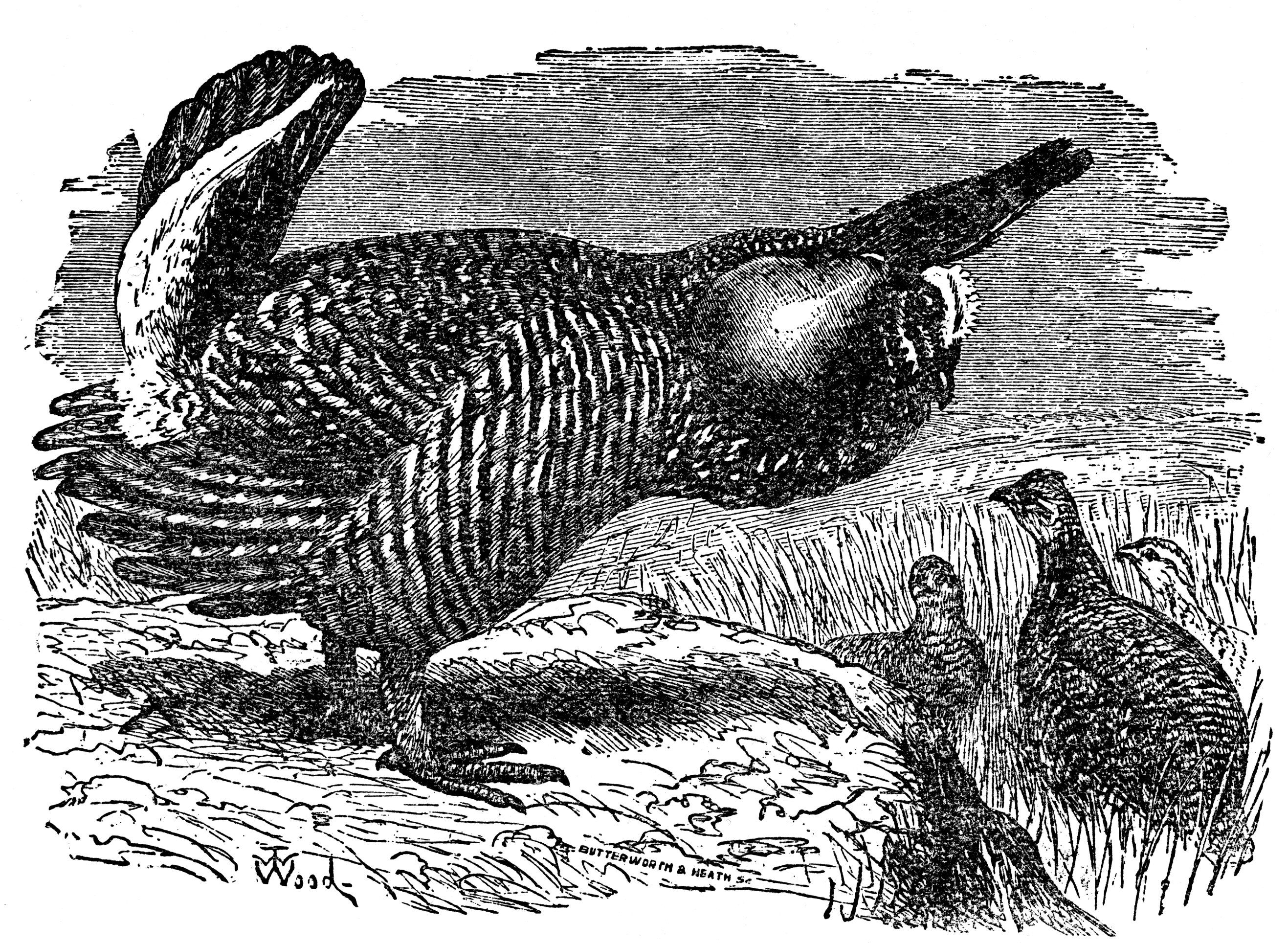
Greater prairie chicken, with the inflated vocal sacs that Brehm had omitted and Darwin wanted for 2nd edition

One of the drawings that Wood replaced in Descent of Man was Alfred Brehm's "Tetrao cupido: male"; his drawing (for the second edition) shows large expanded vocal sacs behind the eyes, the male posing on a raised hummock with three females watching from below in long grass; Brehm's drawing in the first edition had not shown these important features. Darwin was concerned for accurate drawings, especially of features that related to courtship.

However, Wood developed his own view of the purpose of the male argus pheasant's display, which he believed was to "fascinate his lady love", while display by a male animal "undoubtedly has for its object the winning of [the female animal's] favours." Wood was prepared to disagree with Darwin, too, as he felt that the eyespots in its plumage were perfect and thus signs of special creation: "although I feel convinced of the truth of your theory of the origin of species, [the Argus pheasant's plumage] cannot be explained by it ...[but rather it] seems to point to (& almost to prove) the existence of a great artistic power." However the theory in question was not natural selection as in Darwin's 1859 On the Origin of Species, but sexual selection.

Wood's engraving and description of the double-banded argus in The Field magazine in 1871 formed the first account of the presumed species, for which he proposed the name Argus bipunctatus, though it is now taken as a synonym of Linnaeus's Argusianus argus, probably representing a mutant form of that species. The "double-banded" refers to the only known part of the bird, feathers with a doubled pattern found in a milliner's shop as hat decoration.

== Works illustrated by Wood ==
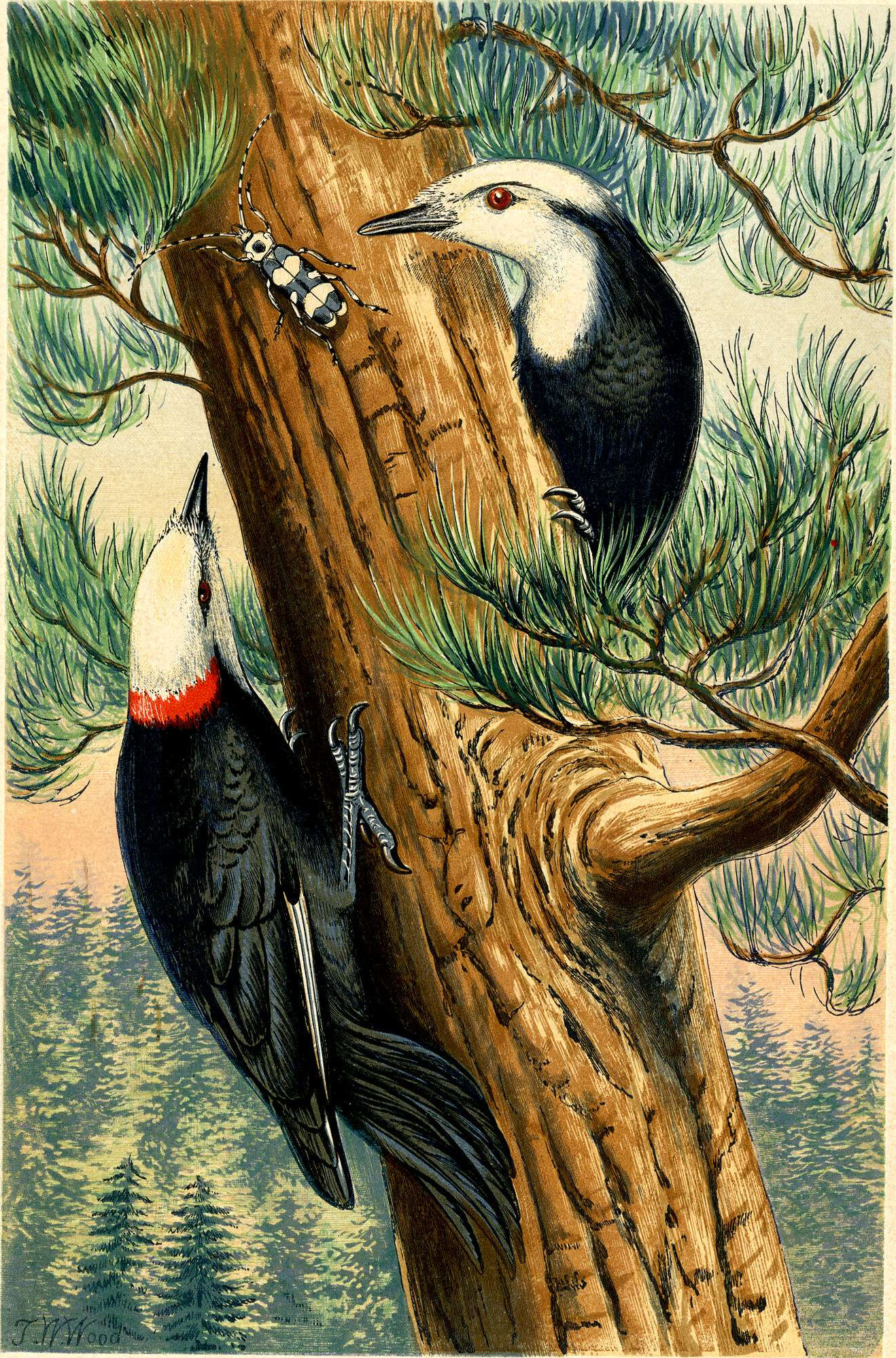
"White-headed Woodpecker", coloured wood-engraving by Benjamin Fawcett, drawing by Wood

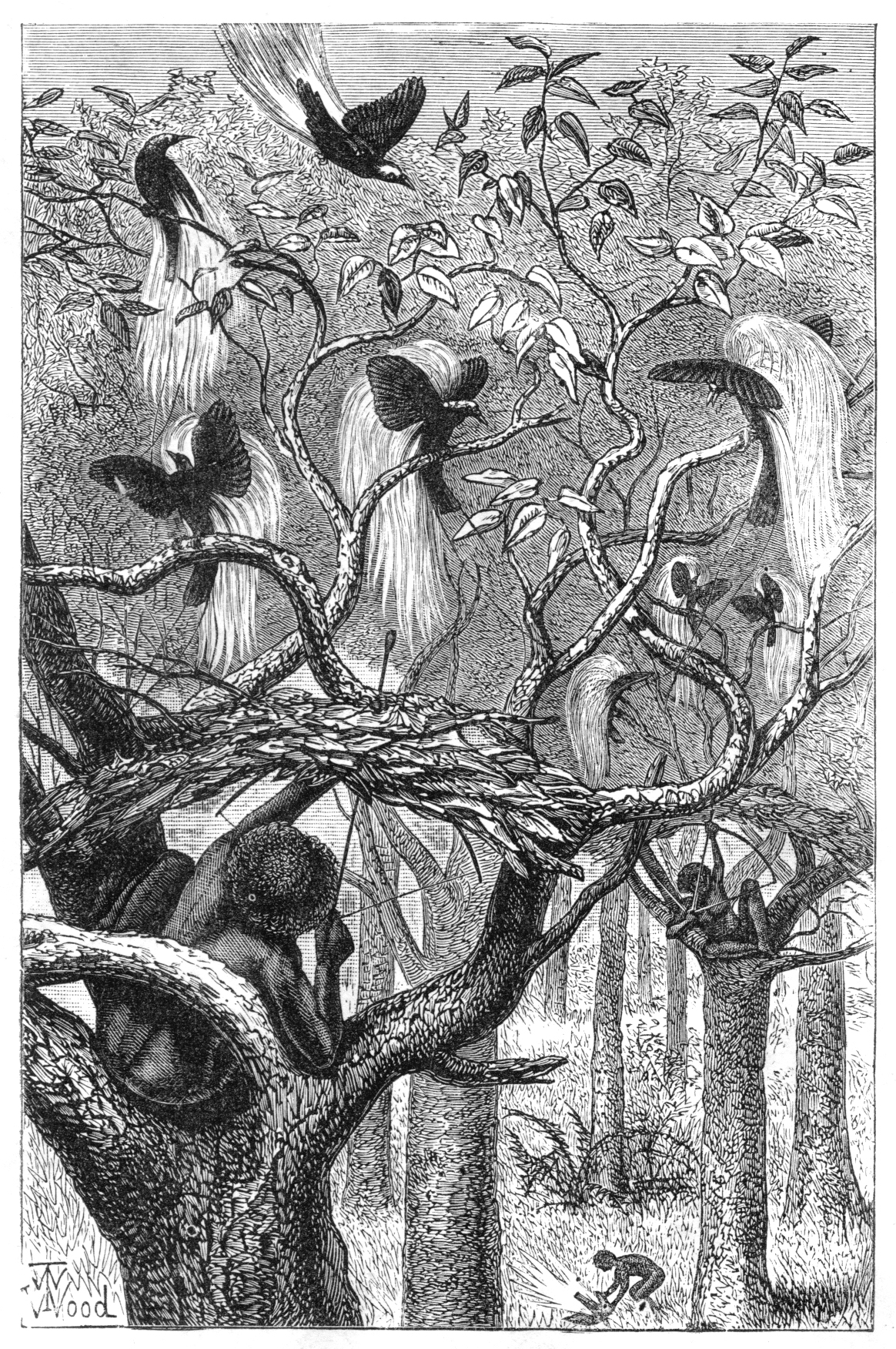
Shooting birds of paradise, from The Malay Archipelago

- Wood, John George, illustrated by W. S. Coleman, E. Smith, T. W. Wood (1864), Our Garden Friends and Foes. Routledge, Warne, and Routledge.
- Wallace, Alfred Russel (1869), The Malay Archipelago.
- Wood, John George, illustrated by W. S. Coleman, E. Smith, T. W. Wood (1870), The Common Moths of England. George Routledge and Sons.
- Wood, T. W. (1871), Curiosities of Ornithology. Groombridge.
- Darwin, Charles (2nd edition, 1874), The Descent of Man.
- Beeton, Samuel Orchart. Illustrated by Harrison Weir, T. W. Wood and others (1871), Beeton's Dictionary of Natural History a Compendious Cyclopaedia of the Animal Kingdom Containing Upwards of Two Thousand Complete and Distinct Articles. Ward, Lock & Tyler.
- Darwin, Charles (1872), The Expression of the Emotions in Man and Animals. John Murray.
- Weir, Harrison William; T. W. Wood (1872), Wild Animals in Freedom and Captivity. Ward, Lock, and Tyler.
- Tegetmeier, William Bernhardt (1873), Pheasants for Coverts and Aviaries. Horace Cox. (2nd edition appeared in 1881)
- Wood, John George, illustrated by W. S. Coleman, H. Weir, T. W. Wood, J. Wolf, J. B. Zwecker (1875), The Illustrated Natural History: Birds. George Routledge and Sons.
- Wood, John George; Edward Alfred Smith; T. W. Wood (1875), Common British Beetles. George Routledge and Sons.
- Blyth, Edward (1881), The Natural History of the Cranes. Horace Cox.
- Sterndale, Robert A. (1885), Natural History of the Mammalia of India and Ceylon. Thacker, Spink, and Co.
- Taylor, J. E. (1889), The Playtime Naturalist. Chatto and Windus.
- Tegetmeier, William Bernhardt (1904), Pheasants their natural history and practical management. Horace Cox.
- Finn, Frank, with colour plates by unknown artists, black and white drawings by T. W. Wood (1911), Talks About Birds. A&C Black.
