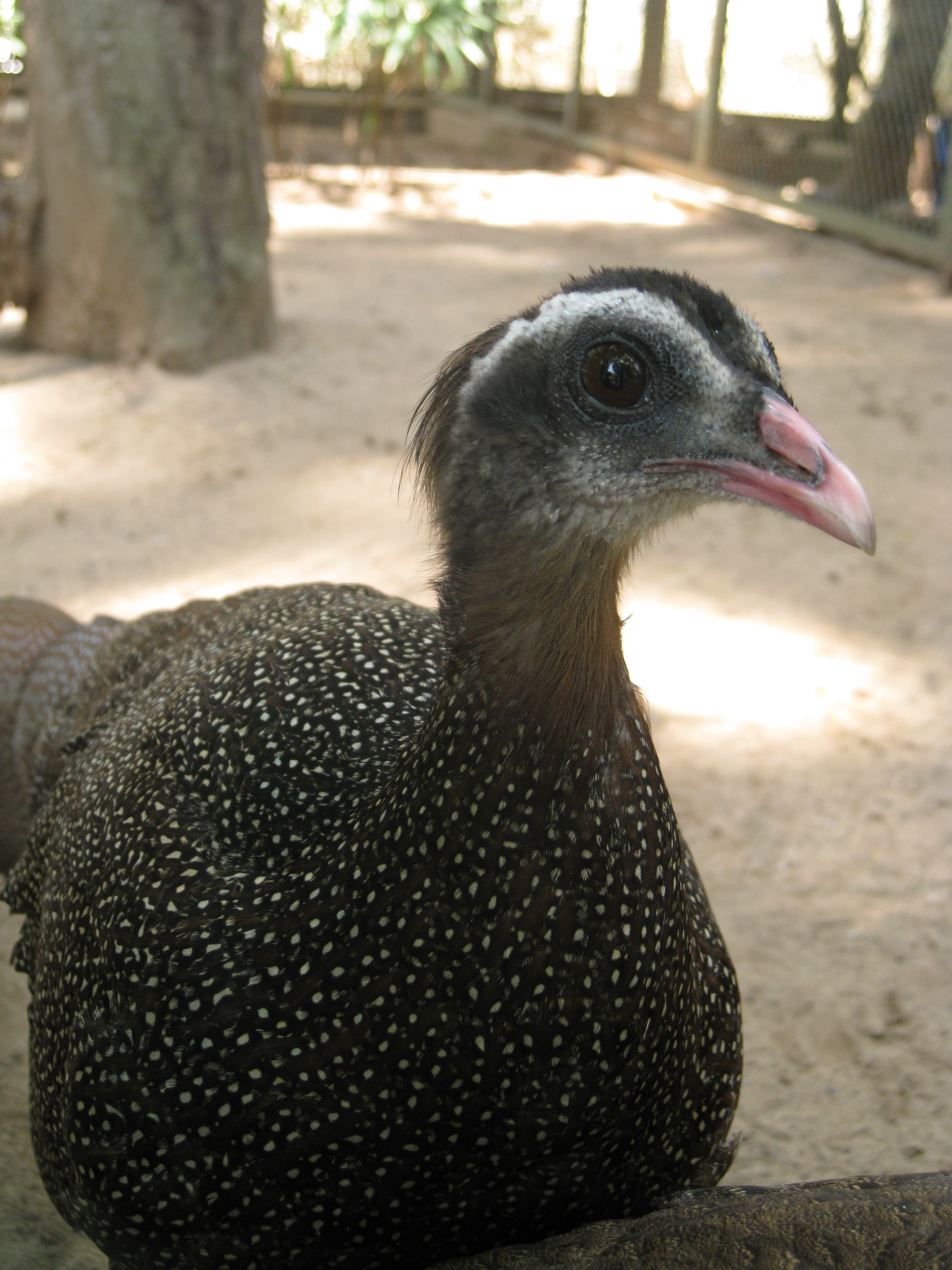
- Female

Conservation status
- Critically Endangered (IUCN 3.1)
- CITES Appendix I

Scientific classification
- Kingdom: Animalia
- Phylum: Chordata
- Class: Aves
- Order: Galliformes
- Family: Phasianidae
- Genus: Rheinardia
- Species: R. ocellata

Binomial name
- Rheinardia ocellata (Elliot, 1871)

= Vietnamese crested argus =

Species of bird

The Vietnamese crested argus (Rheinardia ocellata) is a large and spectacular peafowl-like species of bird in the pheasant family with dark-brown-spotted black and buff plumage, a heavy pink bill, brown irises and blue skin around the eyes. The head has two crests; the hind crest, which extends down the occiput, is erected when alarmed and during intentional behaviors including pair bonding and courtship displays. The male has a broad and greatly elongated tail of twelve feathers. The tail covert (or "train") of the male is the longest of any bird and is believed to contain the longest (and widest) feathers to occur in a wild bird; the Reeves's pheasant has tail feathers of similar length but which are considerably narrower. The tail coverts measure up to 1.73 m (5.7 ft) in length, giving the bird a total length of 1.9–2.39 m (6.2–7.8 ft).

== Description ==
Both sexes are similar in size, with females possessing a prominent marbled barring and more colourful dorsal plumage than the male. They possess white facial plumage marked with disruptive patterning. The female's crest is different morphologically, with more rigid plumes that take up more surface area along the occiput and upper hind neck. Their tails are elongated and laterally compressed, although females have considerably shorter tails. The average length of the female is 74–75 cm (2.43–2.46 ft). Despite being sexually dimorphic by length, the male only weighs about 20% more than the female. The average weight is around 1.5 kg (3.3 lb).

The wings of the Vietnamese crested argus are of unusual size and length for its weight. They are wide and square like those of Argusianus instead of rounded and abbreviated like those of 'true' pheasants. Additionally, there is no discernible trailing edge secondary wing notch amongst the flight feathers, indicating a capacity of sustained flight in species of this genus. Their wings are morphologically similar to the wings of certain semi-arboreal Craciformes, particularly the genus Pipile. The feet and legs of crested argus are also notable in the presence of curiously developed leg scales in males which are widened in such a matter that they give each limb the appearance of the foreleg of a varanid lizard. The toes are long and gracile and like other peafowls, while the hind toe is less recumbent than those of more strictly terrestrial Galliformes.

== Behaviour and ecology ==
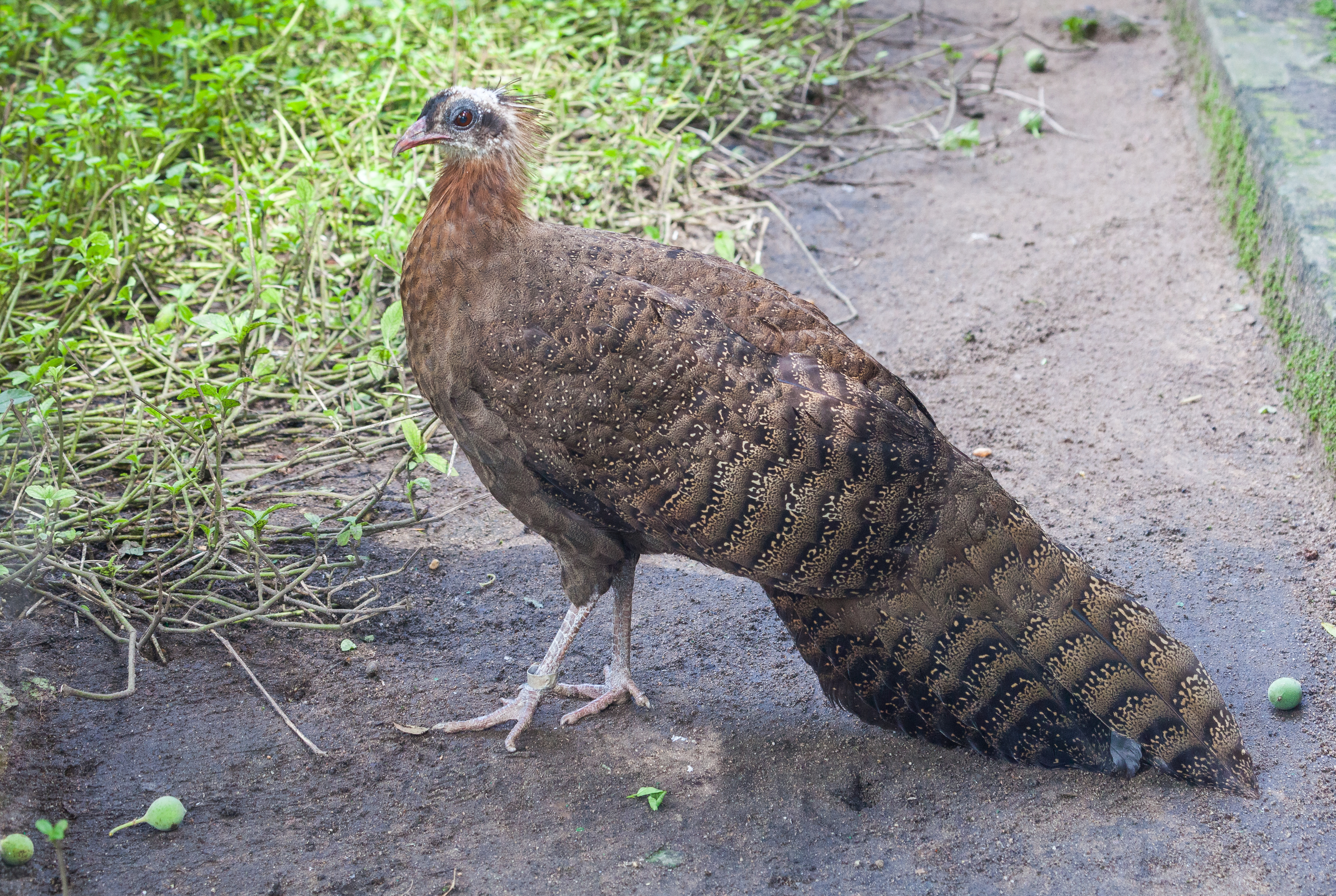
Female at Ho Chi Minh City Zoo.

Little is known about this species in the wild. A shy and elusive bird, the Vietnamese crested argus is found in submontane primary forests of Vietnam and Laos in Southeast Asia. The diet consists mainly of invertebrates, mollusks, amphibians, small reptiles, bamboo shoots, leaves, fruits and fungi. Little is known about its reproductive strategy. While it is believed by some authorities to be polygamous, there is no direct evidence to substantiate this theory.

The male performs various displays utilizing serpentine erratic deportment behaviors, which include perceptible quill vibration. The lower extremities of the male's wings and tail are pushed vertically into the ground leaving trails in sand and leaf litter. These performances may culminate in the lateral compression of the body and plumage and spreading of his train. The head is held parallel to the ground throughout these display behaviors exhibiting upper throat bristles in one species and downy plumuelles in the second, which together with the forward positioning of the crests, obscure the shape of the head. The male also erects a nuchal hood and hisses audibly while stomping his feet. Like other peafowls, the crested argus employs these and more complex display behaviors in anti-predatory encounters, especially with reptiles.

== Habitat and distribution ==
From limited anecdotal observations of local indigenous peoples, the species selects nest sites in elevated reaches, often amongst escarpments on steep slopes amongst leaf litter. They produce very small clutches of one or two large eggs which are incubated for 25 days. Like other peafowls, crested argus chicks hatch with developed wing feathers. They are bill-fed for the first few weeks. In captivity, males also invest in chick rearing, both bill feeding and brooding the chicks both on and off the ground.

Like other peafowl, Vietnamese crested argus retire on emergent trees above the forest canopy for many hours a day. They will remain on these trees for days at a time during the wet season. Vietnamese crested argus are strong fliers and pairs have been reported flying together.

== Status ==
Due to ongoing habitat loss as well as overhunting in some areas, the Vietnamese crested argus is evaluated as Critically Endangered on the IUCN Red List. It is listed on Appendix I of CITES.
