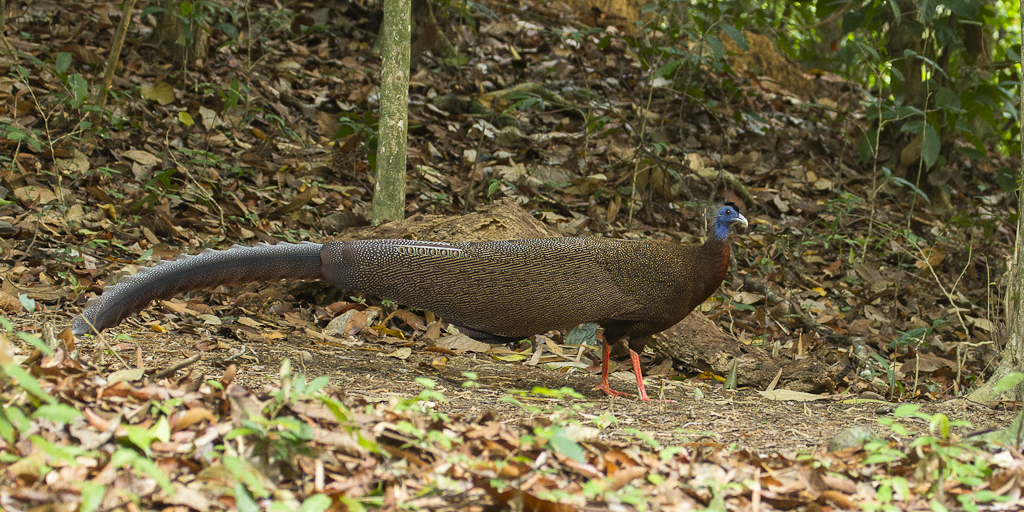
- Male
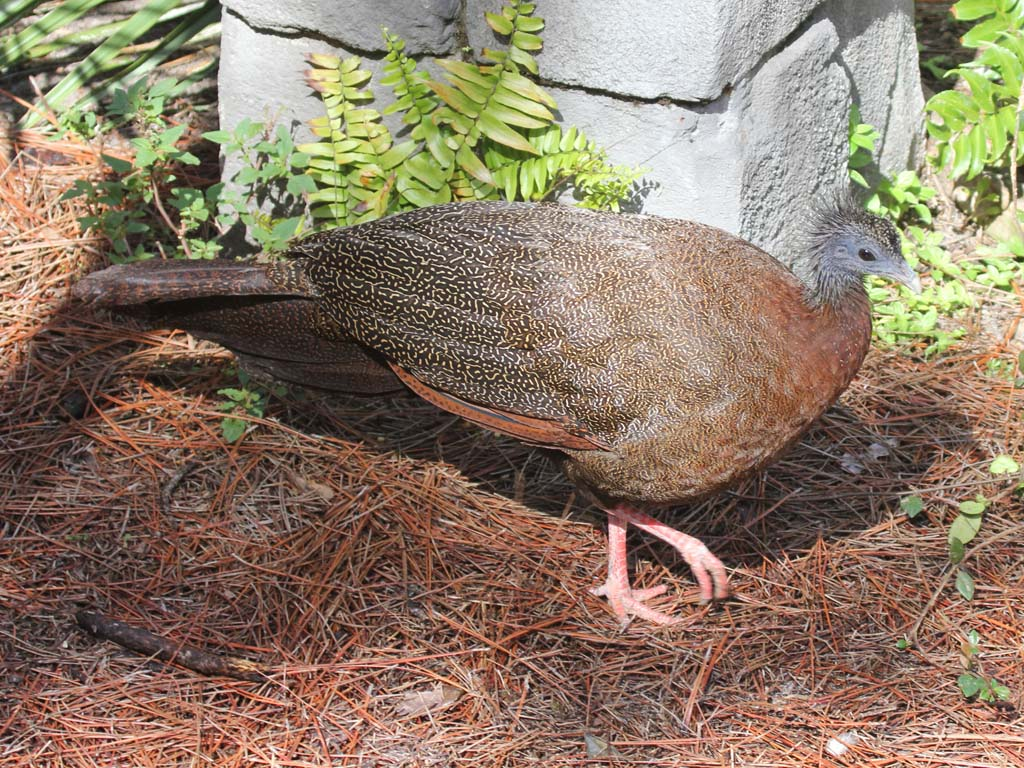
- Female

Conservation status
- Vulnerable (IUCN 3.1)
- CITES Appendix II

Scientific classification
- Kingdom: Animalia
- Phylum: Chordata
- Class: Aves
- Order: Galliformes
- Family: Phasianidae
- Tribe: Pavonini
- Genus: Argusianus; Gray, GR, 1849
- Species: A. argus

Binomial name
- Argusianus argus (Linnaeus, 1766)

Synonyms
- Phasianus argus Linnaeus, 1766; Pavo argus; Argusianus bipunctatus; Argus bipunctatus Wood, 1871; Argus giganteus Temminck, 1813

= Great argus =

Species of pheasant

Call of a great argus

The great argus or greater argus (Argusianus argus) is a large species of pheasant native to the jungles of Borneo, Sumatra and the Malay Peninsula in southeast Asia. It is known for its impressive plumage and courtship behavior. It is not to be confused with the two species of closely related crested argus, genus Rheinardia.

== Taxonomy ==
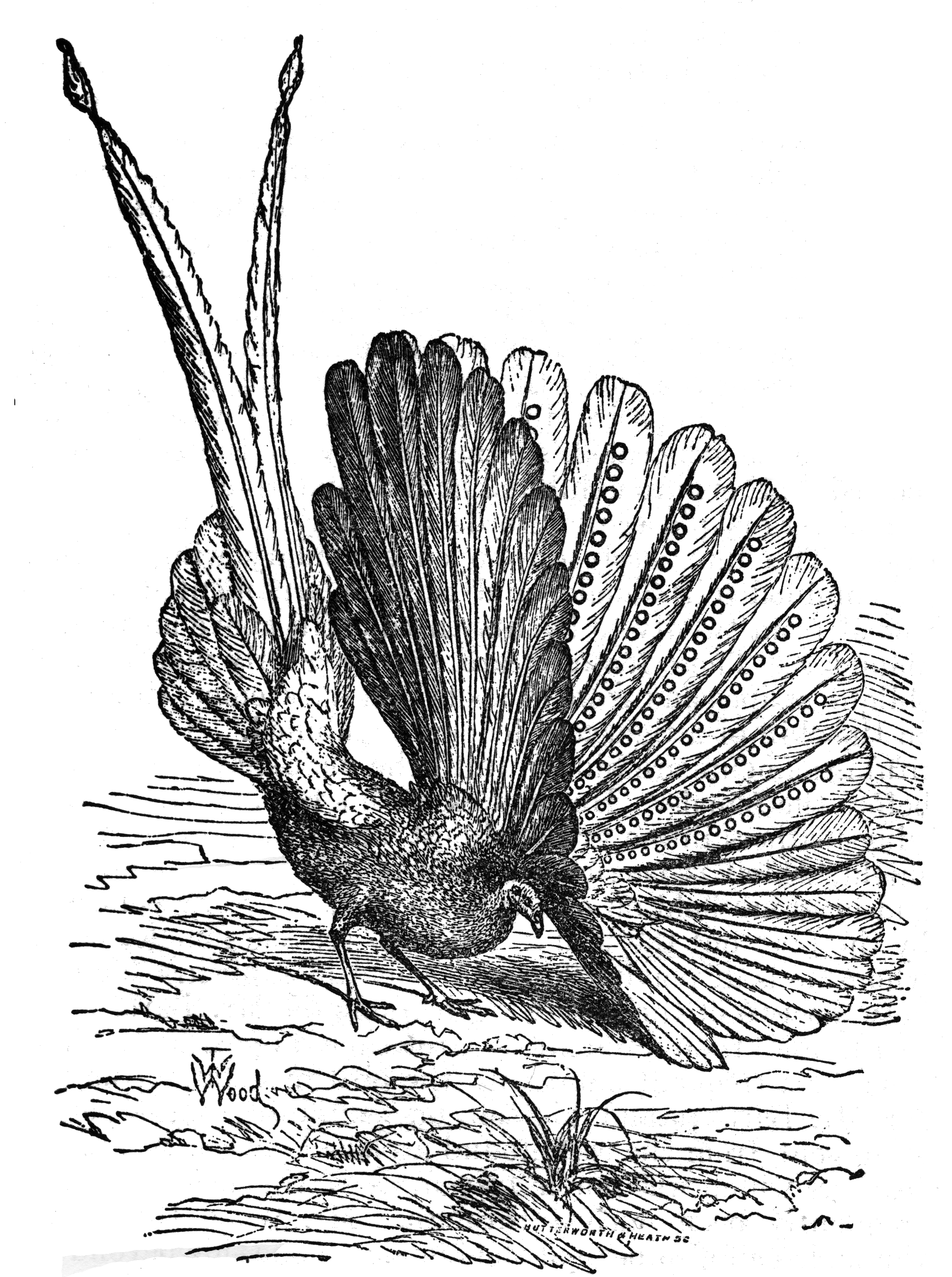
"Argus Pheasant" drawn by T. W. Wood for Charles Darwin's 1874 book, Descent of Man

Carl Linnaeus gave the great argus its specific name (from which its common name and genus name are derived) because of the intricate eye-like patterns on its wings, in reference to Argus, a hundred-eyed giant in Greek mythology. There are two subspecies recognized: Nominate argus of the Malay peninsula and Sumatra, and A. a. grayi of Borneo. William Beebe considered the two races to be distinct species, but they have since been lumped.

The genus Argusianus was introduced in 1849 by the English zoologist George Gray with the great argus as the type species.

=== Double-banded argus ===
The double-banded argus (Argusianus bipunctatus), known only from a portion of a single primary flight feather, was long considered a potential second species. It was described in 1871 from this feather piece, found in a millinery shipment imported to London. Its origin was hypothesized to be from Java, Indonesia or Tioman Island of Malaysia, because of the great argus's absence from these locations. Parkes (1992) rejected the double-banded argus's validity and argued that it almost certainly represents a mutant form of the great argus. The IUCN, following the precautionary principle, listed this taxon as extinct until 2012. It was removed from the IUCN Red list because the IOC had removed this species from its list of valid bird taxa in 2011. While the feather is indeed quite distinct, it represents a fairly simple divergence: The entirely asymmetrically-patterned vanes are instead near-symmetrical, and both bear the darker brown shaftward area with dense whitish speckles. The shaft is thinner than usual and the feather would probably not have been useful for flight.

Nothing similar has come to notice ever since, and as the feather piece is not a composite of two feather halves glued together but an apparently natural specimen, a hoax or fake can be ruled out. Despite all conjecture that has been built around the feather piece, all that can be said is that at some time around 1870, an argus pheasant which bore at least one such feather was shot in an unknown location. Even if this individual was one of the last remnants of a now-extinct population, it is unlikely that only a single feather would have been taken from an unusual specimen of a well-known, often-hunted, and conspicuous bird, and that this single feather would have then been bundled into a shipment of normal great argus feathers. The feather is now housed in the Natural History Museum in London.

== Names ==
The great argus is known in the Malay language as Kuang raya, the "great pheasant"

== Description ==
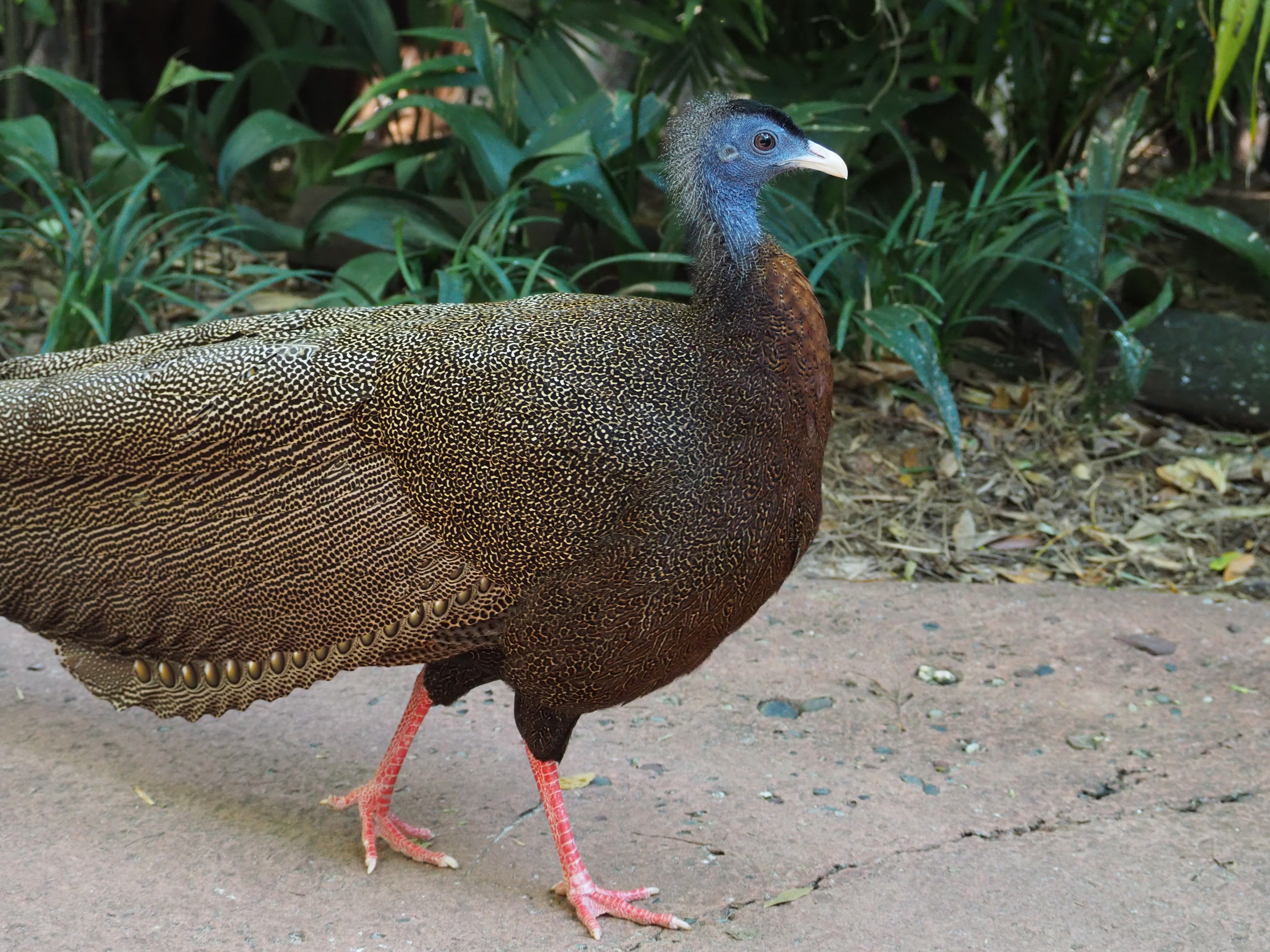
Male at Disney's Animal Kingdom

The great argus is a brown-plumaged pheasant with a blue head and neck, rufous red upper breast, black hair-like feathers on the crown and nape, and red legs.

Unusual among Galliformes, the great argus has no uropygial gland.

=== Male and female plumage ===
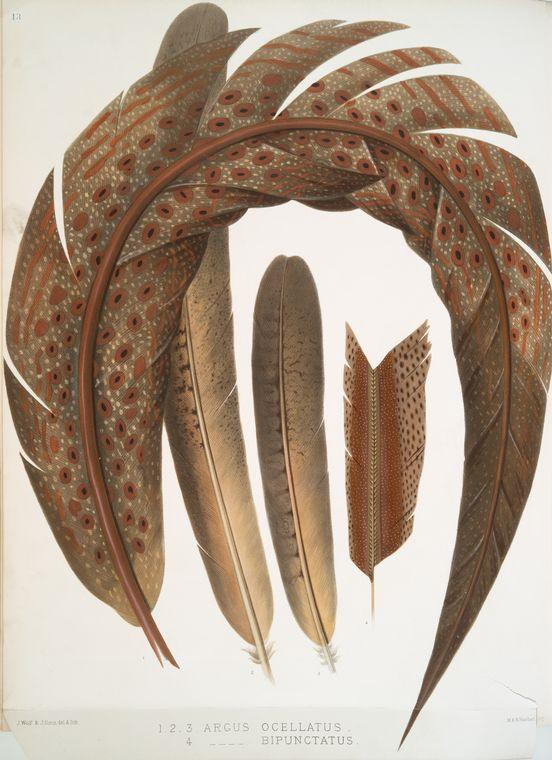
Feathers of Argus ocellatus (synonym for the crested argus Rheinardia ocellata) and Argus bipunctatus (fourth)

The male is one of the largest of all pheasants, measuring 160–200 cm (63–79 in) in total length, including a tail of 105–143 cm (41–56 in), and weighing 2.04–2.72 kg (4.5–6.0 lb). Males have very long tail feathers and huge, broad and greatly elongated secondary wing feathers decorated with large eyespots. Young males develop their adult plumage in their third year.

Females are smaller and duller than males, with shorter tails and fewer eyespots. They measure 72–76 cm (28–30 in) in total length, including a tail of 30–36 cm (12–14 in), and weighs 1.59–1.7 kg (3.5–3.7 lb).

Male argus feathers (bulu ruai or kuai) are coveted among Dayak people across Borneo to adorn the ketapu or lelanjang headdress worn during festivals (gawai).

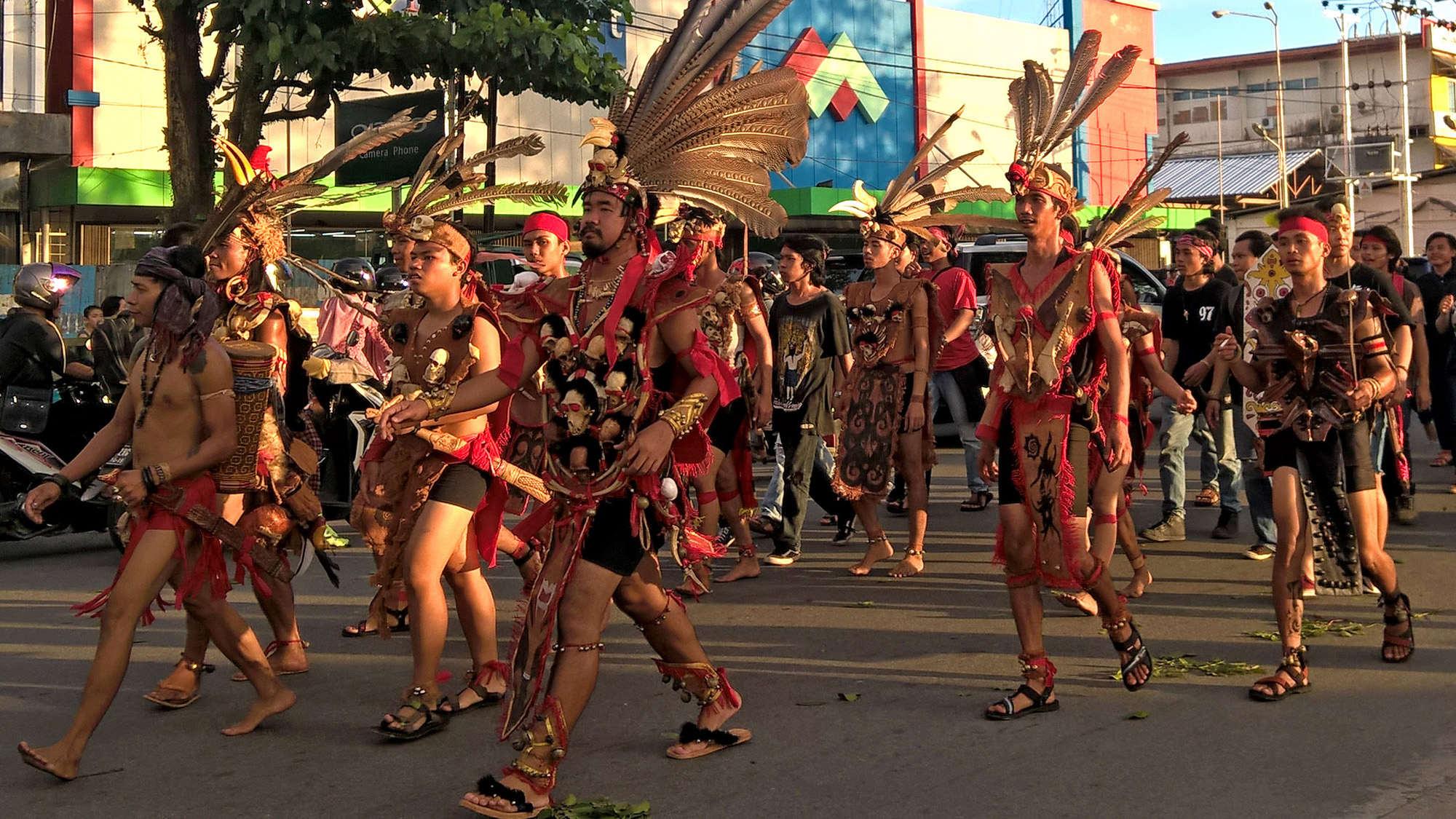
Dayaks in procession during Gawai celebrations in Pontianak, Indonesia, with distinctive argus feathers

== Behaviour ==
=== Diet ===
It feeds on the forest floor in early morning and evening.

=== Mating dance ===
The male clears an open spot in the forest and prepares a dancing ground. He announces himself with loud calls to attract females, then dances before her with his wings spread into two enormous fans, revealing hundreds of eye-like markings. His head is bowed towards the ground, hidden under the display.

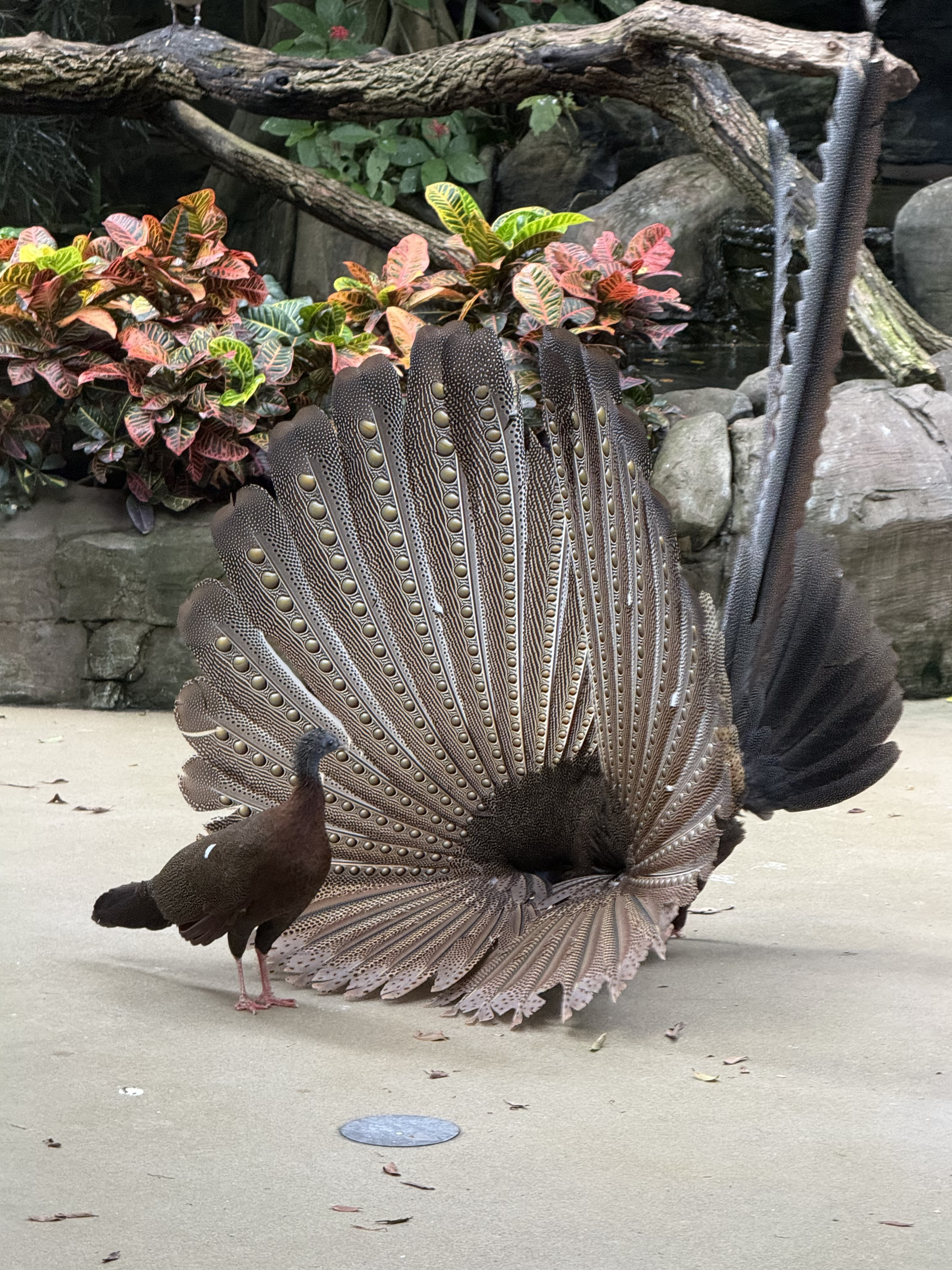
A male great argus (Gus) displaying his fanned wings to his female mate (Mrs. Gus) at the National Aviary.

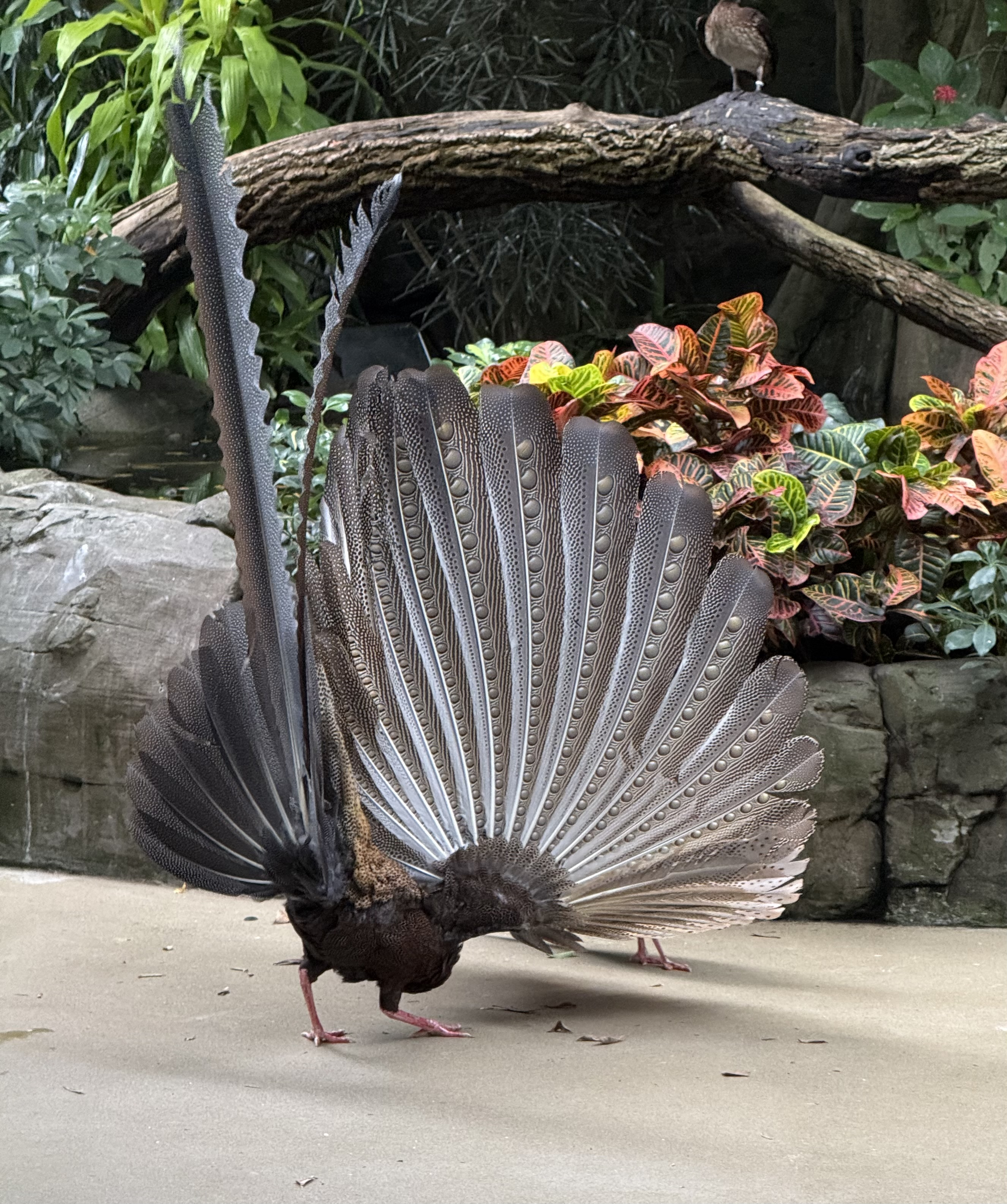
Lateral/rear view

=== Breeding ===
Despite displays similar to polygamous birds and though the great argus was thought to be polygamous in the wild, it has been discovered that it is actually monogamous. The hen lays only two eggs.

== Conservation ==
Due to ongoing habitat loss and to being hunted in some areas, the great argus is evaluated as Vulnerable on the IUCN Red List. It is listed on Appendix II of CITES.
