= The Descent of Man, and Selection in Relation to Sex =

1871 book by Charles Darwin

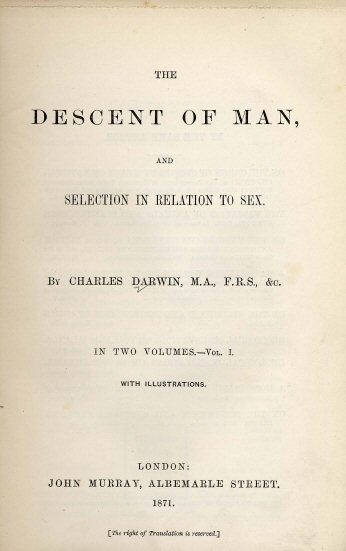
- Title page of the first edition of The Descent of Man, and Selection in Relation to Sex
- Author: Charles Darwin
- Language: English
- Subject: Sexual selection Evolutionary biology
- Publisher: John Murray
- Publication date: 24 February 1871
- Publication place: United Kingdom
- Media type: Print (hardback)
- Text: The Descent of Man, and Selection in Relation to Sex at Wikisource

The Descent of Man, and Selection in Relation to Sex is a book by English naturalist Charles Darwin, first published in 1871, which applies evolutionary theory to human evolution, and details his theory of sexual selection, a form of biological adaptation distinct from, yet interconnected with, natural selection. Darwin used the word "descent" to mean lineal descendant of ancestors. The book discusses many related issues, including evolutionary psychology, evolutionary ethics, evolutionary musicology, differences between human races, differences between sexes, the dominant role of women in mate choice, and the relevance of the evolutionary theory to society.

== Publication ==
As Darwin wrote, he sent chapters to his daughter Henrietta for editing to ensure that damaging inferences could not be drawn, and also took advice from his wife Emma. The zoological illustrator T. W. Wood, (who had also illustrated Wallace's The Malay Archipelago (1869)), drew many of the figures in this book. The corrected proofs were sent off on 15 January 1871 to the publisher John Murray and published on 24 February 1871 as two 450-page volumes, which Darwin insisted was one complete, coherent work, and were priced at £1/4/–.

Within three weeks of publication a reprint had been ordered, and 4,500 copies were in print by the end of March 1871, netting Darwin almost £1,500. Darwin's name created demand for the book, but the ideas were old news. "Everybody is talking about it without being shocked," which he found "proof of the increasing liberality of England". (Note: See this 1871 book review in § External links.)

=== Editions and reprints ===
Darwin and some of his children edited many of the large number of revised editions, some extensively. In late 1873, Darwin tackled a new edition of the Descent of Man. Initially, he offered Wallace the work of assisting him, but, when Emma found out, she had the task given to their son George, so Darwin had to write apologetically to Wallace. Huxley assisted with an update on ape-brain inheritance, which Huxley thought "pounds the enemy into a jelly... though none but anatomists" would know it. The manuscript was completed in April 1874 and published on 13 November that year. This has been the edition most commonly reprinted after Darwin's death and to the present day.

== Content ==
"It has often and confidently been asserted, that man's origin can never be known: but ignorance more frequently begets confidence than does knowledge: it is those who know little, and not those who know much, who so positively assert that this or that problem will never be solved by science."

— Charles Darwin

=== Part I: The evolution of man ===
==== Evolution of physical traits ====
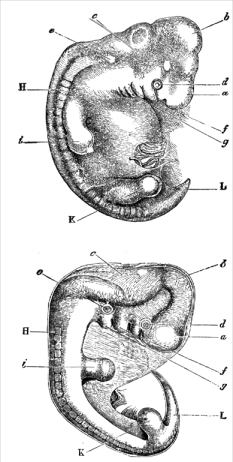
Embryology (here comparing a human and dog) provided one mode of evidence

In the introduction to Descent, Darwin lays out the purpose of his text:

"The sole object of this work is to consider, firstly, whether man, like every other species, is descended from some pre-existing form; secondly, the manner of his development; and thirdly, the value of the differences between the so-called races of man."

Darwin's approach to arguing for the evolution of human beings is to outline how similar human beings are to other animals. He begins by using anatomical similarities, focusing on body structure, embryology, and "rudimentary organs" that presumably were useful in one of man's "pre-existing" forms. He then moves on to argue for the similarity of mental characteristics.

==== Evolution of mental traits ====
Based on the work of his cousin, Francis Galton, Darwin asserts that human character traits and mental characteristics are inherited in the same way as physical characteristics, and argues against the mind/body distinction for the purposes of evolutionary theory. From this Darwin then provides evidence for similar mental powers and characteristics in certain animals, focusing especially on apes, monkeys, and dogs for his analogies for love, cleverness, religion, kindness, and altruism. He concludes on this point that "Nevertheless the difference in mind between man and the higher animals, great as it is, certainly is one of degree and not of kind." He additionally turns to the behaviour of "savages" to show how many aspects of Victorian England's society can be seen in more primitive forms.

In particular, Darwin argues that even moral and social instincts are evolved, comparing religion in man to fetishism in "savages" and his dog's inability to tell whether a wind-blown parasol was alive or not. Darwin also argues that all civilisations had risen out of barbarism, and that he did not think that barbarism is a "fall from grace" as many commentators of his time had asserted.

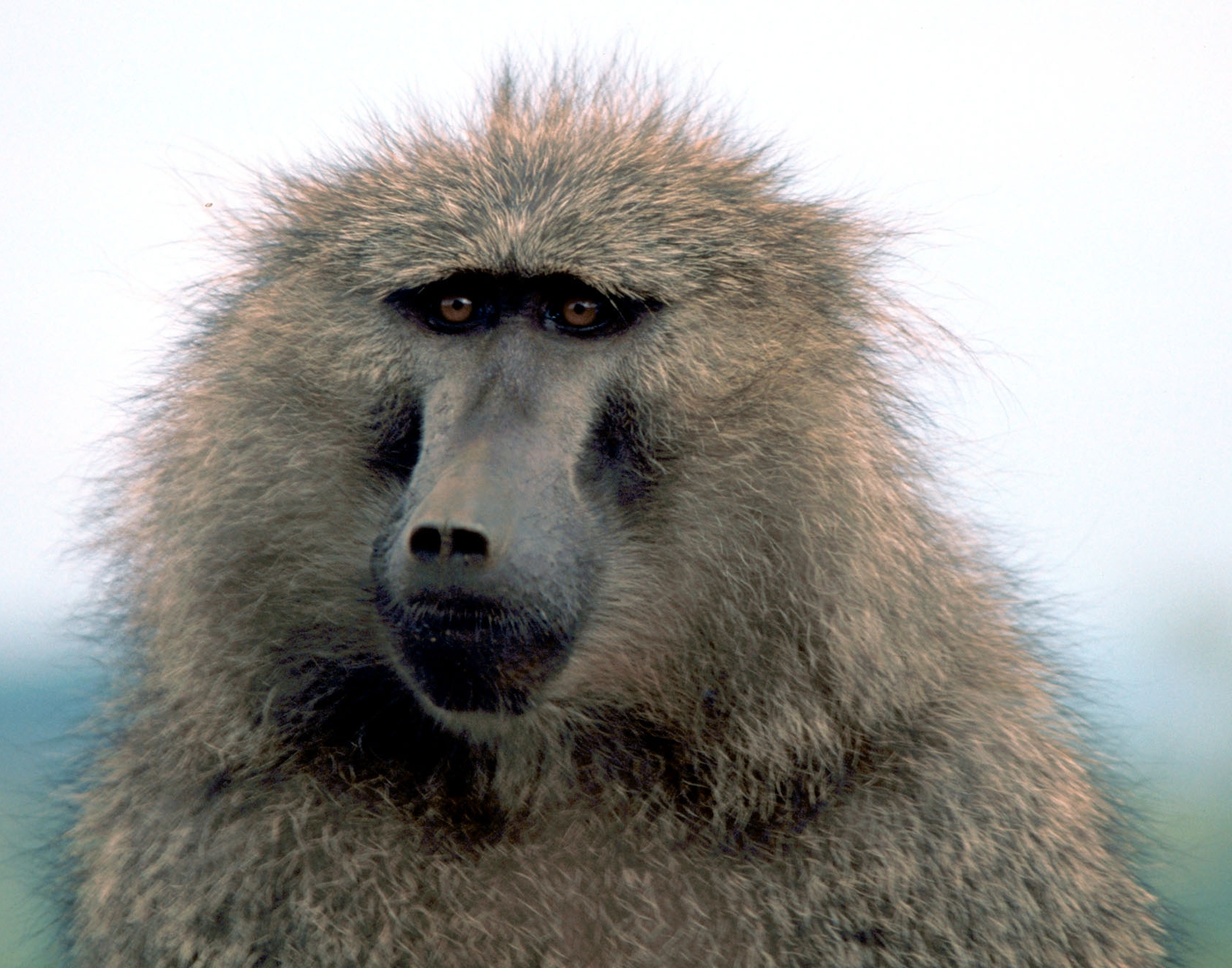
Darwin's primary rhetorical strategy was to argue by analogy. Baboons, dogs, and "savages" provided his chief evidence for human evolution.

==== Natural selection and civilised society ====
In this section of the book, Darwin also turns to the questions of what after his death would be known as social Darwinism and eugenics. Darwin notes that, as had been discussed by Alfred Russel Wallace and Galton, natural selection seemed to no longer act upon civilised communities in the way it did upon other animals:

With savages, the weak in body or mind are soon eliminated; and those that survive commonly exhibit a vigorous state of health. We civilised men, on the other hand, do our utmost to check the process of elimination; we build asylums for the imbecile, the maimed, and the sick; we institute poor-laws; and our medical men exert their utmost skill to save the life of every one to the last moment. There is reason to believe that vaccination has preserved thousands, who from a weak constitution would formerly have succumbed to small-pox. Thus the weak members of civilised societies propagate their kind. No one who has attended to the breeding of domestic animals will doubt that this must be highly injurious to the race of man. It is surprising how soon a want of care, or care wrongly directed, leads to the degeneration of a domestic race; but excepting in the case of man himself, hardly any one is so ignorant as to allow his worst animals to breed. The aid we feel impelled to give to the helpless is mainly an incidental result of the instinct of sympathy, which was originally acquired as part of the social instincts, but subsequently rendered, in the manner previously indicated, more tender and more widely diffused. Nor could we check our sympathy, even at the urging of hard reason, without deterioration in the noblest part of our nature. The surgeon may harden himself whilst performing an operation, for he knows that he is acting for the good of his patient; but if we were intentionally to neglect the weak and helpless, it could only be for a contingent benefit, with an overwhelming present evil. We must therefore bear the undoubtedly bad effects of the weak surviving and propagating their kind; but there appears to be at least one check in steady action, namely that the weaker and inferior members of society do not marry so freely as the sound; and this check might be indefinitely increased by the weak in body or mind refraining from marriage, though this is more to be hoped for than expected. (Chapter 5)

Darwin felt that these urges towards helping the "weak members" was part of our evolved instinct of sympathy, and concluded that "nor could we check our sympathy, even at the urging of hard reason, without deterioration in the noblest part of our nature". As such, '"we must therefore bear the undoubtedly bad effects of the weak surviving and propagating their kind". Darwin did feel that the "savage races" of man would be subverted by the "civilised races" at some point in the near future, as stated in the human races section below. He did show a certain disdain for "savages", professing that he felt more akin to certain altruistic tendencies in monkeys than he did to "a savage who delights to torture his enemies". However, Darwin is not advocating genocide, but clinically predicting, by analogy to the ways that "more fit" varieties in a species displace other varieties, the likelihood that indigenous peoples will eventually die out from their contact with "civilization", or become absorbed into it completely.

His political opinions (and Galton's as well) were strongly inclined against the coercive, authoritarian forms of eugenics that became so prominent in the 20th century. Note that even Galton's ideas about eugenics were not the compulsory sterilisation which became part of eugenics in the United States, or the later genocidal programs of Nazi Germany, but rather further education on the genetic aspects of reproduction, encouraging couples to make better choices for their wellbeing.

For each tendency of society to produce negative selections, Darwin also saw the possibility of society to itself check these problems, but also noted that with his theory "progress is no invariable rule." Towards the end of Descent of Man, Darwin said that he believed man would "sink into indolence" if severe struggle was not continuous, and thought that "there should be open competition for all men; and the most able should not be prevented by laws or customs from succeeding best and rearing the largest number of offspring", but also noted that he thought that the moral qualities of man were advanced much more by habit, reason, learning, and religion than by natural selection. The question plagued him until the end of his life, and he never concluded fully one way or the other about it.

==== On the Races of Man ====
In the first chapters of the book, Darwin argued that there is no fundamental gap between humans and other animals in intellectual and moral faculties as well as anatomy. Retreating from his egalitarian ideas of the 1830s, he ranked life on a hierarchic scale which he extended to human races on the basis of anthropology published since 1860: human prehistory outlined by John Lubbock and Edward Burnett Tylor combined archaeology and studies of modern indigenous peoples to show progressive evolution from Stone Age to steam age; the human mind as the same in all cultures but with modern "primitive" peoples giving insight into prehistoric ways of life. Darwin did not support their view that progress was inevitable, but he shared their belief in human unity and held the common attitude that male European liberalism and civilisation had progressed further in morality and intellect than "savage" peoples.

He attributed the "great break in the organic chain between man and his nearest allies" to extinction, and as spreading civilisation wiped out wildlife and native human cultures, the gap would widen to somewhere "between man in a more civilised state, as we may hope, than the Caucasian, and some ape as low as a baboon, instead of as at present between the negro or Australian and the gorilla." While there "can be no doubt that the difference between the mind of the lowest man and that of the highest animal is immense", the "difference in mind between man and the higher animals, great as it is, is certainly one of degree and not of kind." At the same time, all human races had many mental similarities, and early artefacts showing shared culture were evidence of evolution through common descent from an ancestral species which was likely to have been fully human.

Introducing Chapter 7 ("On the Races of Man"), Darwin wrote: "It is not my intention here to describe the several so-called races of men; but to inquire what is the value of the differences between them under a classificatory point of view, and how they have originated." In answering the question of whether the races should rank as varieties of the same species or count as different species, Darwin discussed arguments which could support the idea that human races were distinct species. This included the geographical distribution of mammal groups which was correlated with the distribution of human races, and the finding of Henry Denny that different species of lice affected different races differently. Darwin then presented the stronger evidence that human races are all the same species, noting that when races mixed together, they intercrossed beyond the "usual test of specific distinctness" and that characteristics identifying races were highly variable. He put great weight on the point that races graduate into each other, writing "But the most weighty of all the arguments against treating the races of man as distinct species, is that they graduate into each other, independently in many cases, as far as we can judge, of their having intercrossed", and concluded that the stronger evidence was that they were not different species.

This conclusion on human unity was supported by monogenism, including John Bachman's evidence that intercrossed human races were fully fertile. Proponents of polygenism opposed unity, but the gradual transition from one race to another confused them when they tried to decide how many human races should count as species: Louis Agassiz said eight, but Morton said twenty-two. Darwin commented that the "question whether mankind consists of one or several species has of late years been much agitated by anthropologists, who are divided into two schools of monogenists and polygenists." The latter had to "look at species either as separate creations or as in some manner distinct entities" but those accepting evolution "will feel no doubt that all the races of man are descended from a single primitive stock". Although races differed considerably, they also shared so many features "that it is extremely improbable that they should have been independently acquired by aboriginally distinct species or races." He drew on his memories of Jemmy Button and John Edmonstone to emphasise "the numerous points of mental similarity between the most distinct races of man. The American aborigines, Negroes and Europeans differ as much from each other in mind as any three races that can be named; yet I was incessantly struck, whilst living with the Fuegians on board the Beagle, with the many little traits of character, shewing how similar their minds were to ours; and so it was with a full-blooded negro with whom I happened once to be intimate." Darwin concluded that "when the principles of evolution are generally accepted, as they surely will be before long, the dispute between the monogenists and the polygenists will die a silent and unobserved death."

Darwin rejected both the idea that races had been separately created, and also the concept that races had evolved in parallel from separate ancestral species of apes. He reviewed possible explanations of divergence into racial differences such as adaptations to different climates and habitats, but found inadequate evidence to support them, and proposed that the most likely cause was sexual selection, a subject to which he devoted the greater part of the book, as described in the following section.

=== Part II and III: Sexual selection ===
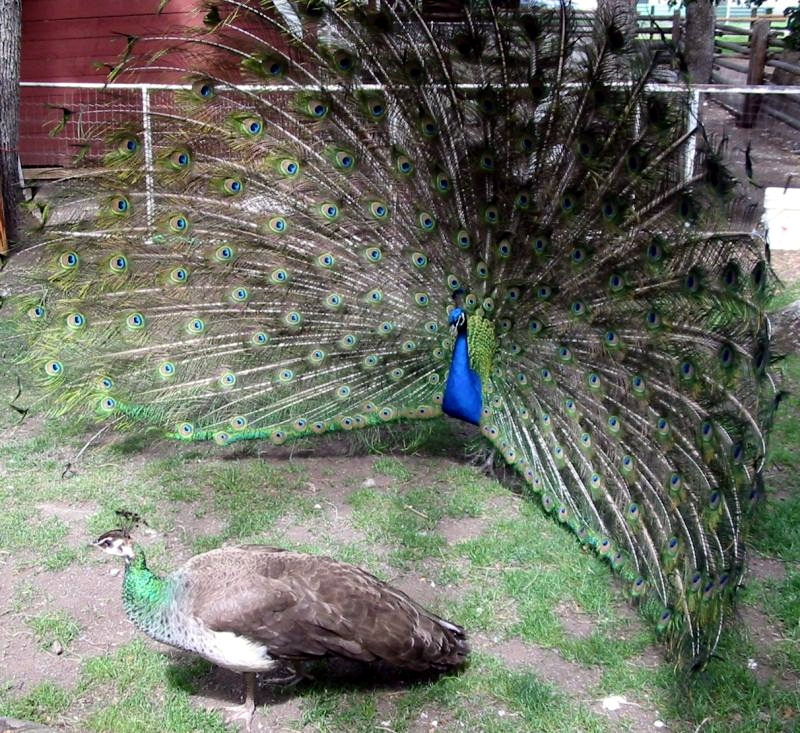
Darwin argued that the female peahen chose to mate with the male peacock who she believed had the most beautiful plumage.

Part II of the book begins with a chapter outlining the basic principles of sexual selection, followed by a detailed review of many different taxa of the kingdom Animalia which surveys various classes such as molluscs and crustaceans. The tenth and eleventh chapters are both devoted to insects, the latter specifically focusing on the order Lepidoptera, the butterflies and moths. The remainder of the book shifts to the vertebrates, beginning with cold blooded vertebrates (fishes, amphibians and reptiles) followed by four chapters on birds. Two chapters on mammals precede those on humans. Darwin explained sexual selection as a combination of "female choosiness" and "direct competition between males".

In the Descent of Man, Darwin wrote that by choosing tools and weapons over the years, "man has ultimately become superior to woman", but Antoinette Blackwell's argument for women's equality went largely ignored until the 1970s when feminist scientists and historians began to explore Darwin. As recently as 2004, Griet Vandermassen, aligned with other Darwinian feminists of the 1990s and early 2000s (decade), wrote that a unifying theory of human nature should include sexual selection. But then the "opposite ongoing integration" was promoted by another faction as an alternative in 2007. Nonetheless, Darwin's explanation of sexual selection continues to receive support from both social and biological scientists as "the best explanation to date".

==== Apparently non-adaptive features ====
In Darwin's view, anything that could be expected to have some adaptive feature could be explained easily with his theory of natural selection. In On the Origin of Species, Darwin wrote that to use natural selection to explain something as complicated as a human eye, "with all its inimitable contrivances for adjusting the focus to different distances, for admitting different amounts of light, and for the correction of spherical and chromatic aberration" might at first appear "absurd in the highest possible degree," but nevertheless, if "numerous gradations from a perfect and complex eye to one very imperfect and simple, each grade being useful to its possessor, can be shown to exist", then it seemed quite possible to account for within his theory.

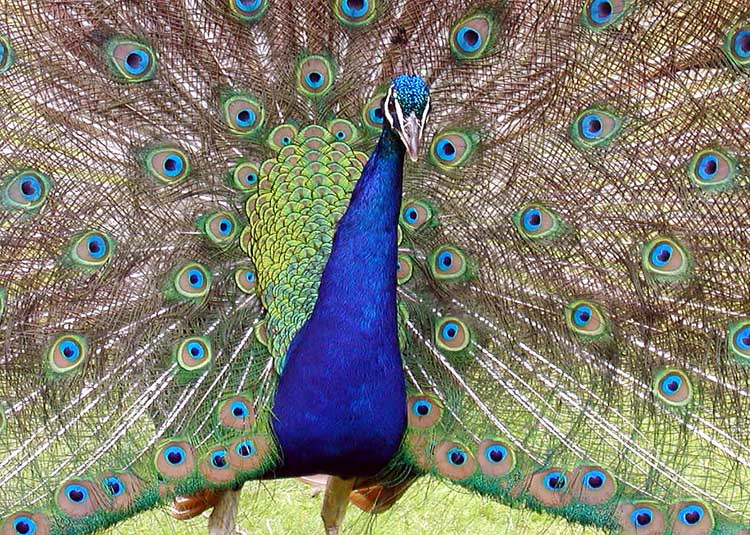
"The sight of a feather in a peacock's tail, whenever I gaze at it, makes me sick!"

More difficult for Darwin were highly evolved and complicated features that conveyed apparently no adaptive advantage to the organism. Writing to colleague Asa Gray in 1860, Darwin commented that he remembered well a "time when the thought of the eye made me cold all over, but I have got over this stage of the complaint, & now small trifling particulars of structure often make me very uncomfortable. The sight of a feather in a peacock's tail, whenever I gaze at it, makes me sick!" Why should a bird like the peacock develop such an elaborate tail, which seemed at best to be a hindrance in its "struggle for existence"? To answer the question, Darwin had introduced in the Origin the theory of sexual selection, which outlined how different characteristics could be selected for if they conveyed a reproductive advantage to the individual. In this theory, male animals in particular showed heritable features acquired by sexual selection, such as "weapons" with which to fight over females with other males, or beautiful plumage with which to woo the female animals. Much of Descent is devoted to providing evidence for sexual selection in nature, which he also ties into the development of aesthetic instincts in human beings, as well as the differences in coloration between the human races.

Darwin had developed his ideas about sexual selection for this reason since at least the 1850s, and had originally intended to include a long section on the theory in his large, unpublished book on species. When it came to writing Origin (his "abstract" of the larger book), though, he did not feel he had sufficient space to engage in sexual selection to any strong degree, and included only three paragraphs devoted to the subject. Darwin considered sexual selection to be as much of a theoretical contribution of his as was his natural selection, and a substantial amount of Descent is devoted exclusively to this topic.

== Darwin's background issues and concerns ==
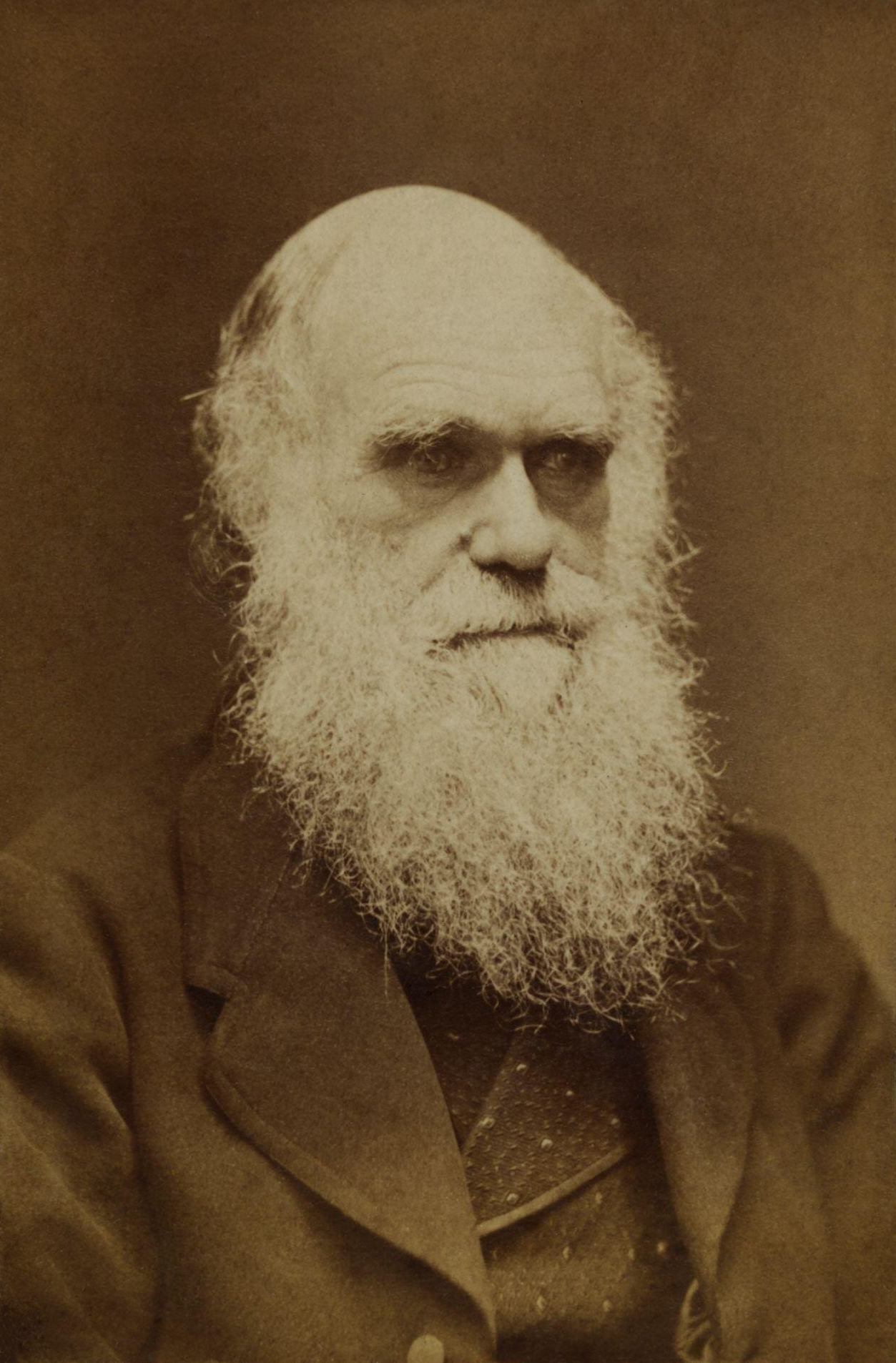
Charles Darwin's second book of theory involved many questions of Darwin's time.

It was Darwin's second book on evolutionary theory, following his 1859 work, On the Origin of Species, in which he explored the concept of natural selection and which had been met with a firestorm of controversy in reaction to Darwin's theory. A single line in this first work hinted at such a conclusion: "light will be thrown on the origin of man and his history." When writing The Variation of Animals and Plants Under Domestication in 1866, Darwin intended to include a chapter including humans in his theory, but the book became too big and he decided to write a separate "short essay" on ape ancestry, sexual selection and human expression, which became The Descent of Man.

The book is a response to various debates of Darwin's time far more wide-ranging than the questions he raised in Origin. It is often erroneously assumed that the book was controversial because it was the first to outline the idea of human evolution and common descent. Coming out so late into that particular debate, while it was clearly Darwin's intent to weigh in on this question, his goal was to approach it through a specific theoretical lens (sexual selection), which other commentators at the period had not discussed, and consider the evolution of morality and religion. The theory of sexual selection was also needed to counter the argument that beauty with no obvious utility, such as exotic birds' plumage, proved divine design, which had been put strongly by the Duke of Argyll in his book The Reign of Law (1868).

=== Human faculties ===
The major sticking point for many in the question of human evolution was whether human mental faculties could have possibly been evolved. The gap between humans and even the smartest ape seemed too large, even for those who were sympathetic to Darwin's basic theory. Alfred Russel Wallace, the co-discoverer of evolution by natural selection, believed that the human mind was too complex to have evolved gradually, and began over time to subscribe to a theory of evolution that took more from spiritualism than it did the natural world. Darwin was deeply distressed by Wallace's change of heart, and much of the Descent of Man is in response to opinions put forth by Wallace. Darwin focuses less on the question of whether humans evolved than he does on showing that each of the human faculties considered to be so far beyond those of beasts—such as moral reasoning, sympathy for others, beauty, and music—can be seen in kind (if not degree) in other animal species (usually apes and dogs).

=== Human races ===
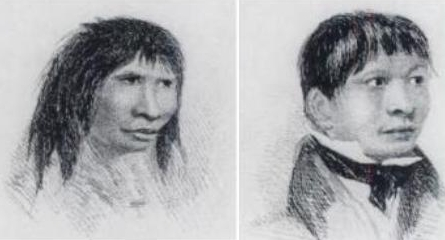
On the Beagle voyage, Darwin met Fuegians including Jemmy Button who had been briefly educated in England.

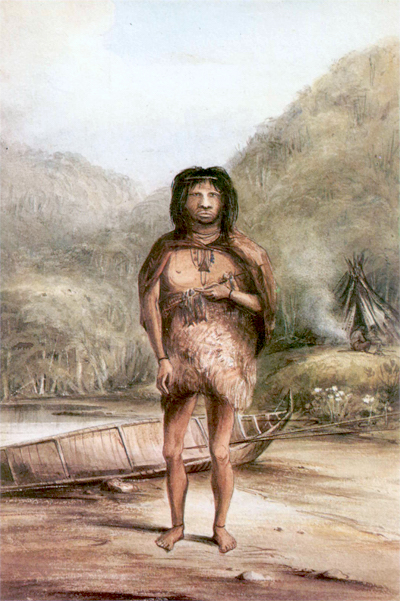
He was shocked to encounter their relatives in Tierra del Fuego, who appeared to him to be primitive savages.

Darwin was a long-time abolitionist who had been horrified by slavery when he first came into contact with it in Brazil while touring the world on the Beagle voyage many years before (slavery had been illegal in the British Empire since 1833). Darwin also was perplexed by the "savage races" he saw in South America at Tierra del Fuego, which he saw as evidence of man's more primitive state of civilisation. During his years in London, his private notebooks were riddled with speculations and thoughts on the nature of the human races, many decades before he published Origin and Descent.

When making his case that human races were all closely related and that the apparent gap between humans and other animals was due to closely related forms being extinct, Darwin drew on his experiences on the voyage showing that "savages" were being wiped out by "civilized" peoples. When Darwin referred to "civilised races" he was almost always describing European cultures, and apparently drew no clear distinction between biological races and cultural races in humans. Few made that distinction at the time, an exception being Alfred Russel Wallace.

=== Social implications of Darwinism ===
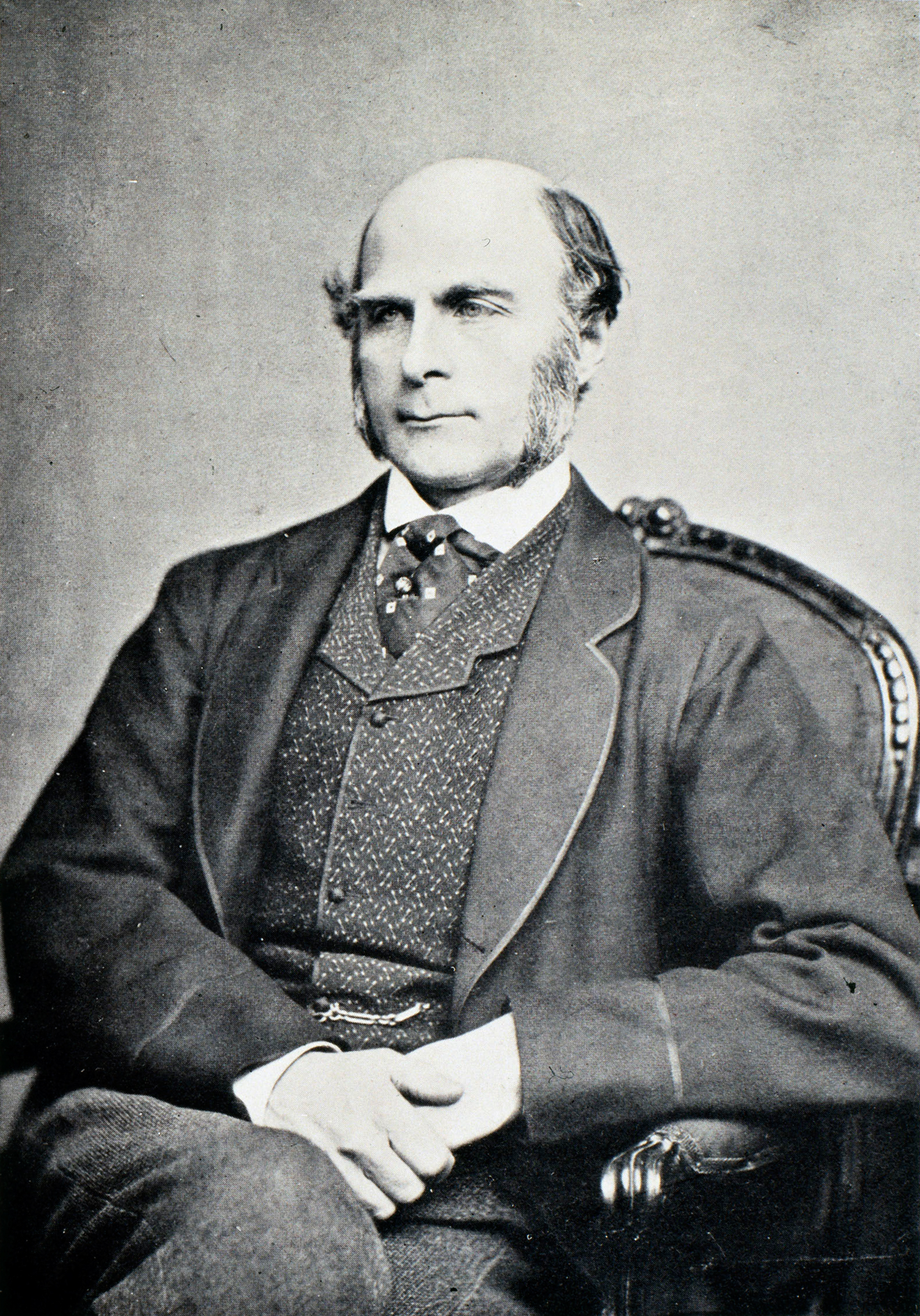
Darwin's cousin, Francis Galton, proposed that an interpretation of Darwin's theory was the need for eugenics to save society from "inferior" minds.

Since the publication of Origin, a wide variety of opinions had been put forward on whether the theory had implications towards human society. One of these, later known as social Darwinism, has been attributed to Herbert Spencer's writings before publication of Origin, and argued that society would naturally sort itself out, and that the more "fit" individuals would rise to positions of higher prominence, while the less "fit" would succumb to poverty and disease. On this interpretation, Spencer alleged that government-run social programmes and charity hinder the "natural" stratification of the populace. But while Spencer did first introduce the phrase "survival of the fittest" in 1864, he always vigorously denied this interpretation of his works, arguing that the natural course of social evolution is toward greater altruism, and that the good done by charity and giving aid to the less fortunate, so long as done without coercion and in such a way as to foster independence rather than dependence, outweighs any harm done by saving the less fit. In any case, Spencer was primarily a Lamarckian evolutionist; hence, fitness could be acquired in a single generation and thus in no way did "survival of the fittest" as a tenet of Darwinian evolution predate it.

Another of these interpretations, later known as eugenics, was put forth by Darwin's cousin, Francis Galton, in 1865 and 1869. Galton argued that just as physical traits were clearly inherited among generations of people, so could be said for mental qualities (genius and talent). Galton argued that social mores needed to change so that heredity was a conscious decision, to avoid over-breeding by "less fit" members of society and the under-breeding of the "more fit" ones. In Galton's view, social institutions such as welfare and insane asylums were allowing "inferior" humans to survive and reproduce at levels faster than the more "superior" humans in respectable society, and if corrections were not soon taken, society would be awash with "inferiors." Darwin read his cousin's work with interest, and devoted sections of Descent of Man to discussion of Galton's theories. Neither Galton nor Darwin, though, advocated any eugenic policies such as those undertaken in the early 20th century, as government coercion of any form was very much against their political opinions.

== Sexual selection ==
Darwin's views on sexual selection were opposed strongly by his co-discoverer of natural selection, Alfred Russel Wallace, though much of his "debate" with Darwin took place after Darwin's death. Wallace argued against sexual selection, saying that the male-male competition aspects were simply forms of natural selection, and that the notion of female mate choice was attributing the ability to judge standards of beauty to animals far too cognitively undeveloped to be capable of aesthetic feeling (such as beetles).

Wallace also argued that Darwin too much favoured the bright colours of the male peacock as adaptive without realising that the "drab" peahen's coloration is itself adaptive, as camouflage. Wallace more speculatively argued that the bright colours and long tails of the peacock were not adaptive in any way, and that bright coloration could result from non-adaptive physiological development (for example, the internal organs of animals, not being subject to a visual form of natural selection, come in a wide variety of bright colours). This has been questioned by later scholars as quite a stretch for Wallace, who in this particular instance abandoned his normally strict "adaptationist" agenda in asserting that the highly intricate and developed forms such as a peacock's tail resulted by sheer "physiological processes" that were somehow not at all subjected to adaptation.

Apart from Wallace, a number of scholars considered the role of sexual selection in human evolution controversial. Darwin was accused of looking at the evolution of early human ancestors through the moral lens of the 19th century Victorian society. Joan Roughgarden, citing many elements of sexual behaviour in animals and humans that cannot be explained by the sexual selection model, suggested that the function of sex in human evolution was primarily social. Joseph Jordania suggested that in explaining such human morphological and behavioural characteristics as singing, dancing, body painting, wearing of clothes, Darwin (and proponents of sexual selection) neglected another important evolutionary force, intimidation of predators and competitors with the ritualised forms of warning display. Warning display uses virtually the same arsenal of visual, audio, olfactory and behavioural features as sexual selection. According to the principle of aposematism (warning display), to avoid costly physical violence and to replace violence with the ritualised forms of display, many animal species (including humans) use different forms of warning display: visual signals (contrastive body colours, eyespots, body ornaments, threat display and various postures to look bigger), audio signals (hissing, growling, group vocalisations, drumming on external objects), olfactory signals (producing strong body odors, particularly when excited or scared), behavioural signals (demonstratively slow walking, aggregation in large groups, aggressive display behaviour against predators and conspecific competitors). According to Jordania, most of these warning displays were incorrectly attributed to the forces of sexual selection.

While debates on the subject continued, in January 1871 Darwin started on another book, using leftover material on emotional expressions, which became The Expression of the Emotions in Man and Animals.

In recent years controversy also involved the peacock tail, the most famous symbol of the principle of sexual selection. A seven-year Japanese study of free-ranging peafowl came to the conclusion that female peafowl do not select mates merely on the basis of their trains. Mariko Takahashi found no evidence that peahens expressed any preference for peacocks with more elaborate trains, such as trains having more ocelli, a more symmetrical arrangement or a greater length. Takahashi determined that the peacock's train was not the universal target of female mate choice, showed little variance across male populations, and, based on physiological data collected from this group of peafowl, do not correlate to male physical conditions. Adeline Loyau and her colleagues responded to Takahashi's study by voicing concern that alternative explanations for these results had been overlooked and that these might be essential for the understanding of the complexity of mate choice. They concluded that female choice might indeed vary in different ecological conditions. Jordania suggested that peacock's display of colourful and oversize train with plenty of eyespots, together with their extremely loud call and fearless behaviour has been formed by the forces of natural selection (not sexual selection), and served as a warning (aposematic) display to intimidate predators and rivals.

=== Effect on society ===
In January 1871, Thomas Huxley's former disciple, the anatomist St. George Mivart, had published On the Genesis of Species as a critique of natural selection. In an anonymous Quarterly Review article, he claimed that the Descent of Man would unsettle "our half educated classes" and talked of people doing as they pleased, breaking laws and customs. An infuriated Darwin guessed that Mivart was the author and, thinking "I shall soon be viewed as the most despicable of men", looked for an ally. In September, Huxley wrote a cutting review of Mivart's book and article and a relieved Darwin told him "How you do smash Mivart's theology... He may write his worst & he will never mortify me again". As 1872 began, Mivart politely inflamed the argument again, writing "wishing you very sincerely a happy new year" while wanting a disclaimer of the "fundamental intellectual errors" in the Descent of Man. This time, Darwin ended the correspondence.
