= Eopavo =

Eopavo Temporal range: Late Miocene 9.8–7.0 Ma

Scientific classification
- Kingdom: Animalia
- Phylum: Chordata
- Class: Aves
- Order: Galliformes
- Family: Phasianidae
- Tribe: Pavonini
- Genus: †Eopavo; Yu et al, 2026
- Species: †E. hezhengensis

Binomial name
- †Eopavo hezhengensis Yu et al, 2026

Extinct bird genus

Eopavo (meaning "dawn Pavo") is an extinct genus of small peafowl known from the Late Miocene Liushu Formation of China. The genus contains a single species Eopavo hezhengensis, known from a partial skeleton.

== Description ==
The holotype specimen of Eopavo hezhengensis consists of an incomplete skeleton represented by elements of limb, synsacrum, pelvis, pectoral girdle, and vertebrae. Morphological and phylogenetic analyses place Eopavo as a member of the clade Pavonini, which contains the extant peafowl genera Pavo and Afropavo. It has a relatively long spur relative to its body size, suggesting the holotype represents a male individual.

== Paleobiology ==
The small body size of Eopavo was likely linked to the high elevation of the savanna habitat it inhabited, which differs from extant peafowls. Yu et al. (2026) also suggested that peafowl likely originated from Tibetan Plateau.
