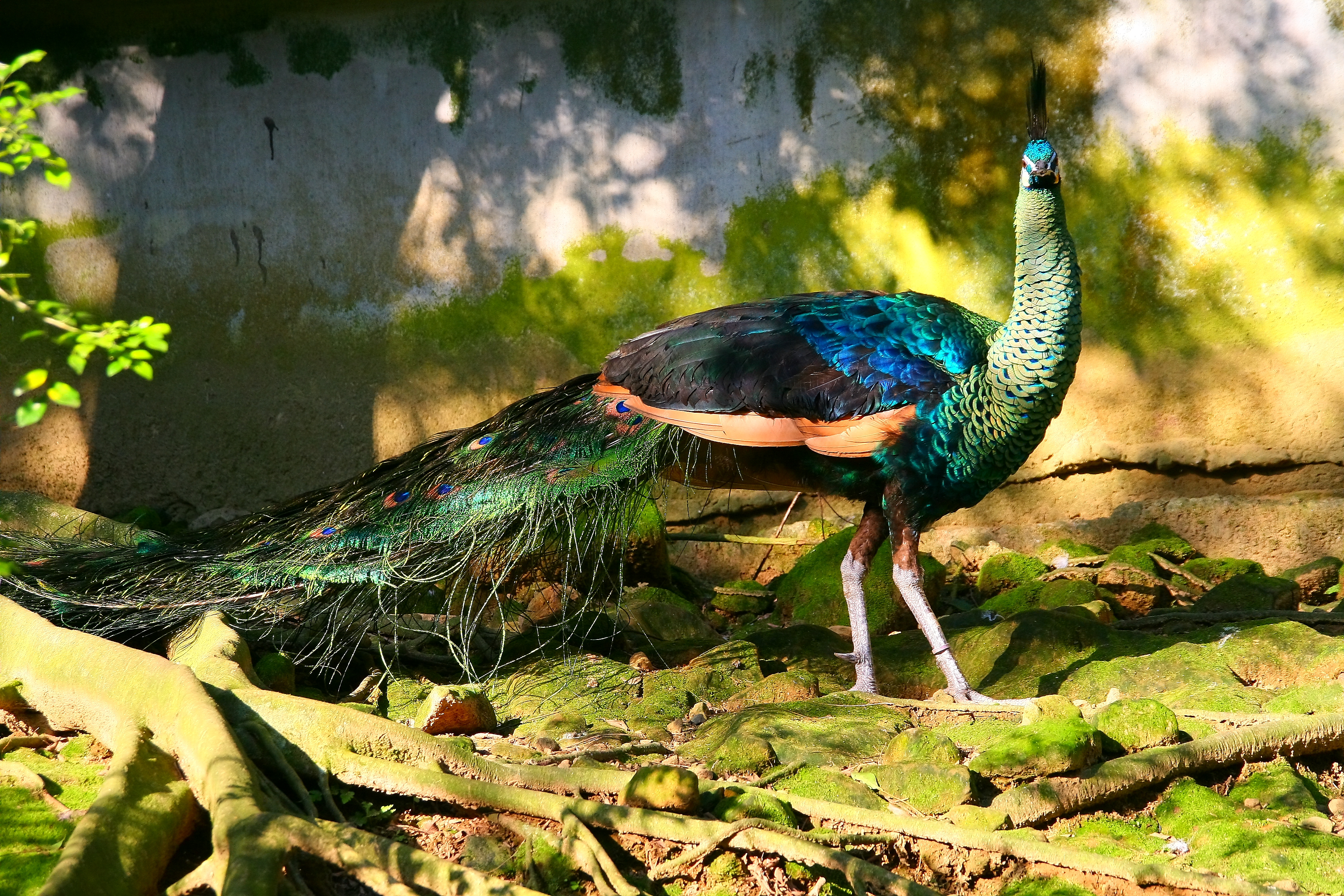
- Green peafowl (Pavo muticus)

Scientific classification
- Kingdom: Animalia
- Phylum: Chordata
- Class: Aves
- Order: Galliformes
- Family: Phasianidae
- Subfamily: Phasianinae
- Tribe: Pavonini; Rafinesque, 1815

Genera
- Argusianus; Rheinardia; Afropavo; Pavo; †Eopavo

= Pavonini =

Pavonini Temporal range: Middle Miocene to Present 13.6–0 Ma

Tribe of birds

Pavonini is a tribe in the subfamily Phasianinae. Living members of this family are primarily found in tropical Asia, along with one species in the Congo Rainforest in Africa and fossil remains also known from Europe and East Asia. The tribe contains the clades of peafowl and the arguses, both notable for their charismatic male plumage used in elaborate courting rituals. This grouping was supported by a 2021 phylogenetic analysis of Galliformes, and accepted by the International Ornithological Congress. The tribe name is accepted by the Howard and Moore Complete Checklist of the Birds of the World.

== Species ==
| Image | Genus | Living species |
|---|---|---|
| | Afropavo | Congo peafowl, Afropavo congensis |
| | Argusianus | Great argus, Argusianus argus |
| | Pavo | Indian peafowl, Pavo cristatus; Green peafowl, Pavo muticus |
| | Rheinardia | Vietnamese crested argus, Rheinardia ocellata; Malaysian crested argus, Rheinardia nigrescens |

== Evolution ==
The earliest named record of the tribe is Eopavo hezhengensis from the Late Miocene of Linxia Basin, Gansu, Northwestern China. It lived in a high-elevation savanna habitat, unlike the humid forests preferred by its extant relatives. Eopavo, along with older unnamed peafowl fossils from the Himalayan area (13.6 Ma), indicates that the peafowl dispersal likely occurred from Asia (the Tibetan Plateau) to other continents between the Late Miocene and the Pliocene.
