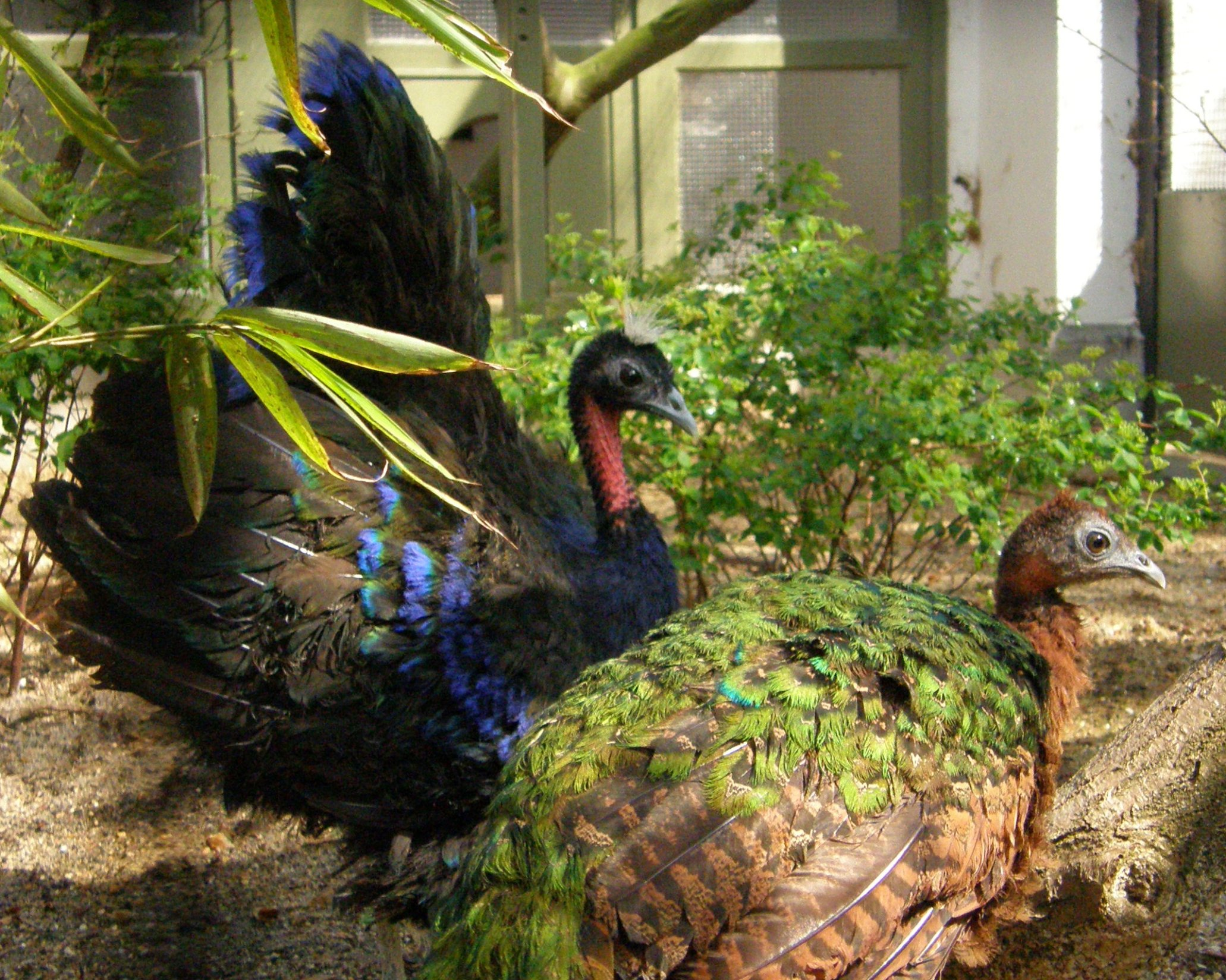
- A pair at Antwerp Zoo, with male left and female right

Conservation status
- Near Threatened (IUCN 3.1)

Scientific classification
- Kingdom: Animalia
- Phylum: Chordata
- Class: Aves
- Order: Galliformes
- Family: Phasianidae
- Tribe: Pavonini
- Genus: Afropavo; Chapin, 1936
- Species: A. congensis

Binomial name
- Afropavo congensis Chapin, 1936
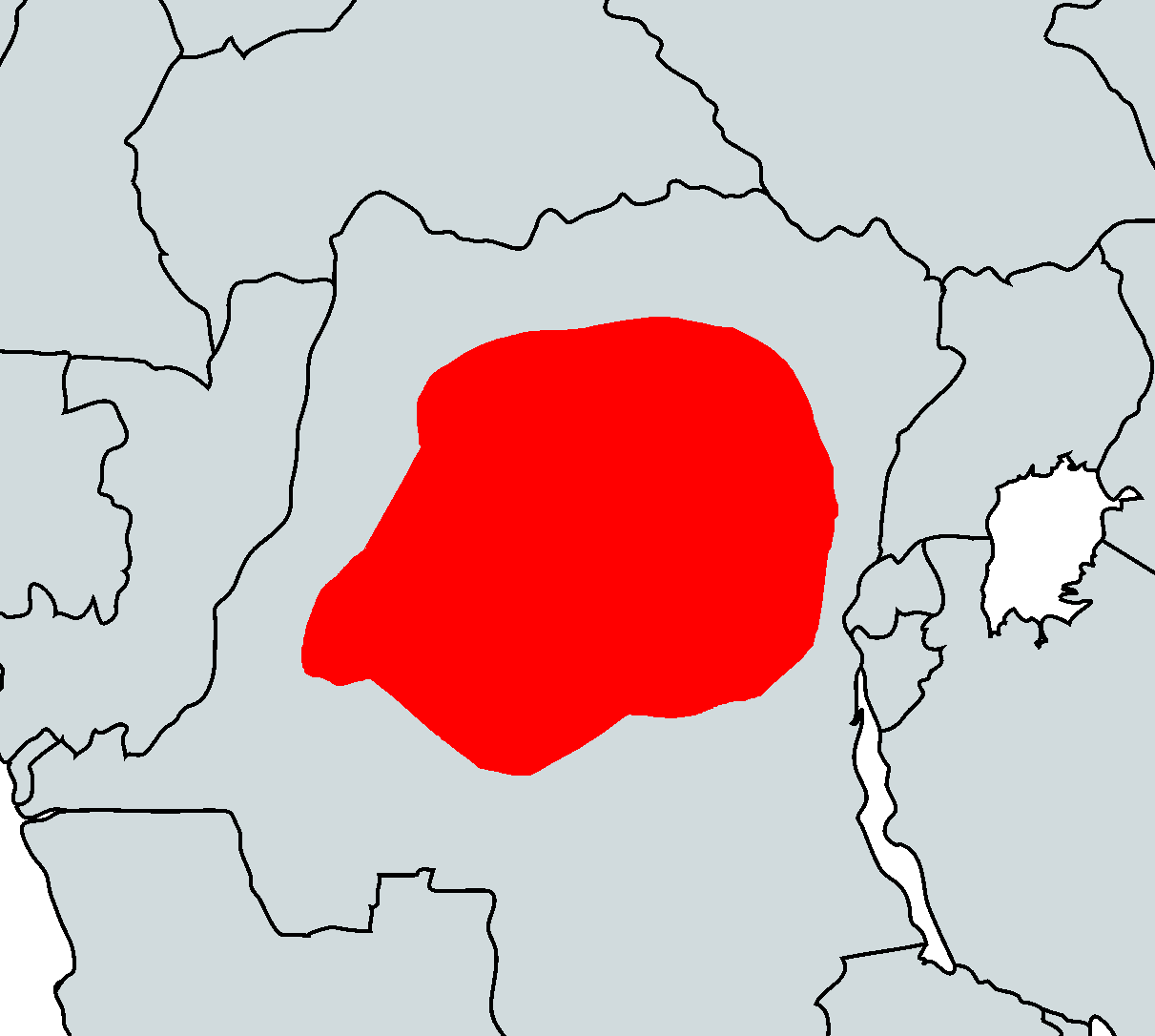

= Congo peafowl =

Congo peafowl Temporal range: Late Pleistocene–present

Species of bird

The Congo peafowl (Afropavo congensis), also known as the African peafowl or mbulu by the Bakôngo, is a species native to the Congo Basin. It is one of three species commonly termed "peafowl" in the tribe Pavonini native to Africa. It represents the sole extant member of the genus Afropavo. It is listed as Near Threatened on the IUCN Red List.

== History ==
Dr. James P. Chapin of the New York Zoological Society on an unsuccessful African expedition in search of the okapi noticed that the native Congolese headdresses contained long reddish-brown feathers that he could not identify with any previously known species of bird. In 1934, Chapin visited the Royal Museum of Central Africa in Tervuren and saw two stuffed specimens with similar feathers labeled as the 'Indian peacock'; these specimens would become the types of the Congo peafowl, which Chapin described in 1936. In 1955, Chapin managed to find seven specimens of the species. The Congo peafowl has physical characteristics of both the peafowl and the guineafowl, which may indicate that the species is a link between the two families.

== Description ==
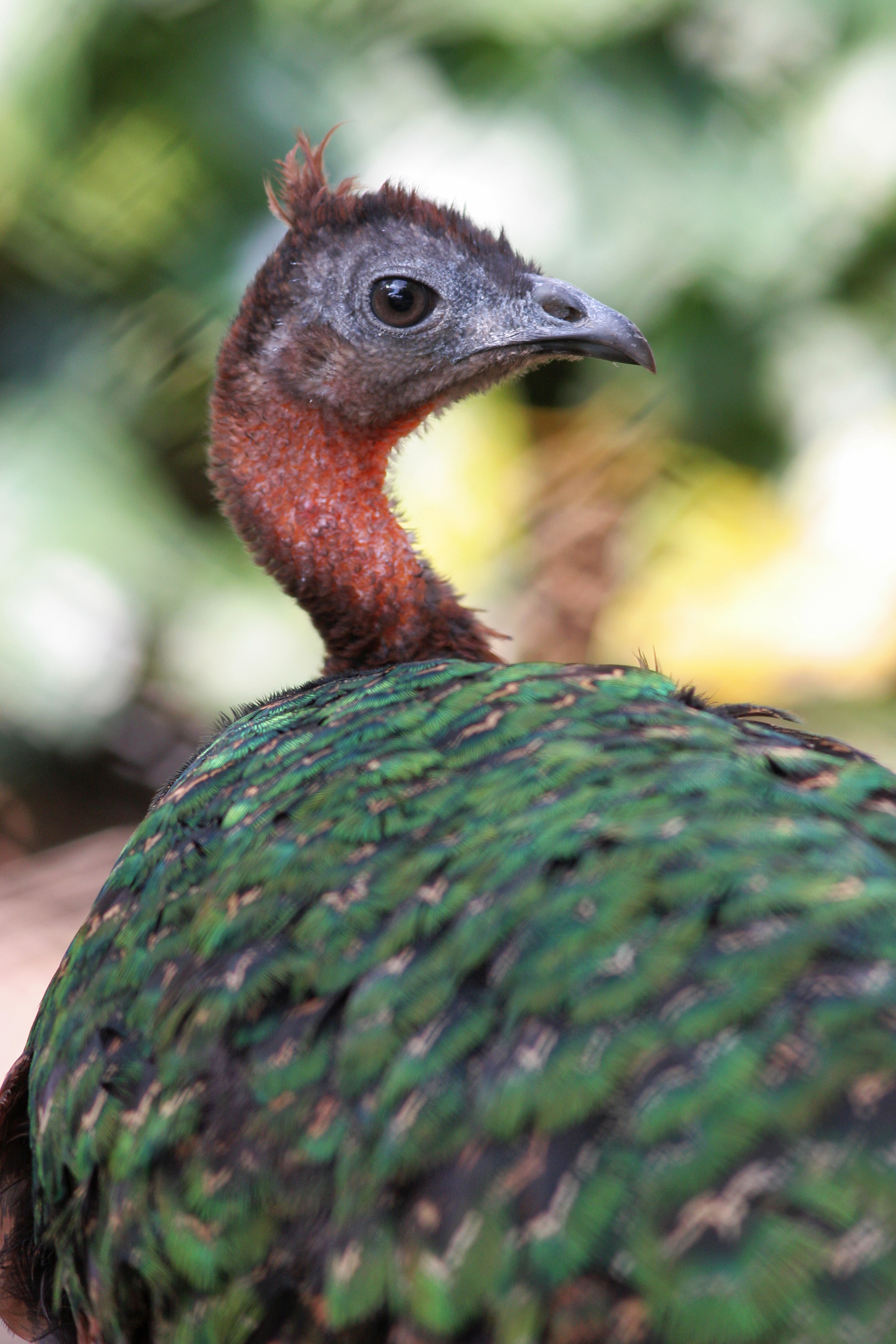
Female head

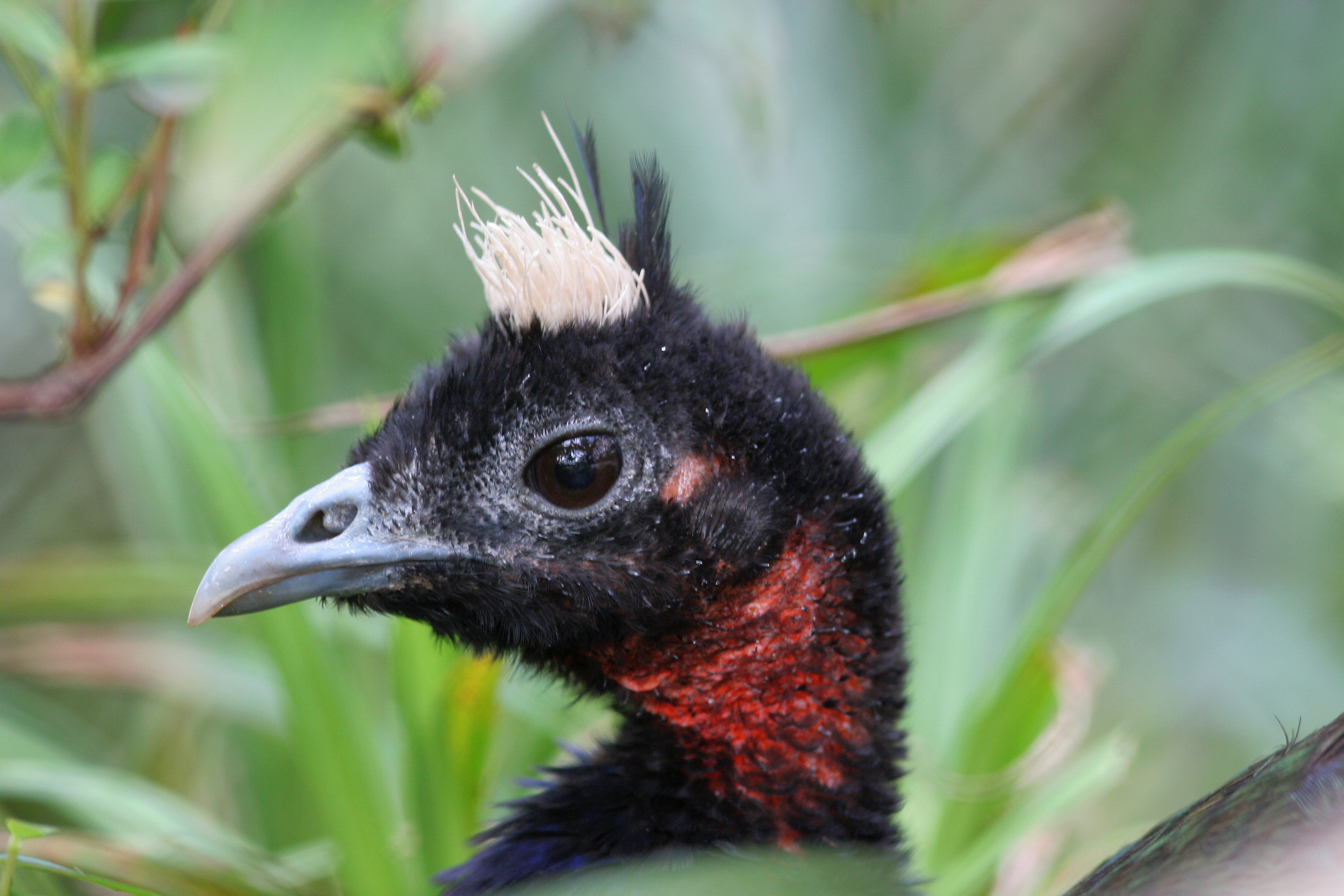
Male head

The male (peacock) of this species is a large bird of up to 64–70 cm (25–28 in) in length. Though much less impressive than his Asiatic cousins, the male's feathers are nevertheless deep blue with a metallic green and violet tinge. He has bare red neck skin, grey feet, and a black tail with fourteen tail feathers. His crown is adorned with vertical white elongated hair-like feathers.

The female (peahen) measures up to 60–63 centimetres (24–25 in) in length; generally, she is a chestnut brown bird with a black abdomen, metallic green back, and a short chestnut brown crest. Both sexes resemble immature Asian peafowl, with early stuffed birds being erroneously classified as such before they were officially designated as members of a unique species.

== Distribution and habitat ==
The Congo peafowl inhabits and is endemic to the Central Congolian lowland forests of the Democratic Republic of the Congo where it has also been designated the national bird. It occurs in both primary and secondary forest in Salonga National Park. Secondary signs of its presence like droppings and feathers were more frequently encountered in regenerating secondary forest than in primary forest. In secondary forest, its droppings were found close to watercourses, where trees were smaller and plant diversity lower than in primary forest.

In the 1990s, it was recorded in Maiko National Park, foremost in low hills and ridges between watersheds.

Fossil remains attributable to the Congo peafowl are known from the Late Pleistocene of the Plovers Lake fossil site in Gauteng, South Africa. This indicates that either the Congo peafowl expanded and contracted its range across Africa following Late Pleistocene climatic changes, or its extant distribution is a relict of a much wider past distribution.

== Behaviour and ecology ==
The Congo peafowl is an omnivore with a diet consisting mainly of fruits and insects. In Salonga National Park, its diet includes fruits from Allanblackia floribunda, junglesop, Canarium schweinfurthii, oil palm, Klainedoxa gabonensis, African breadfruit, and Xylopia aethiopica and a multitude of insects, spiders, mollusks and worms.

In Salonga National Park, its diet is taxonomically narrower in secondary forest than in primary forest. The male has a similar display to that of other species of peafowl, though the Congo peacock actually fans its tail feathers while other peacocks fan their upper tail covert feathers. The Congo peafowl is monogamous, though detailed mating information from the wild is still needed. The peacock of the species has a high-pitched "gowe" calling noise while the peahen emits a low "gowah". They have loud duets consisting of "rro-ho-ho-o-a" from both sexes.

== Threats ==
The Congo peafowl is threatened by habitat loss caused by mining, shifting cultivation and logging.

== Conservation ==
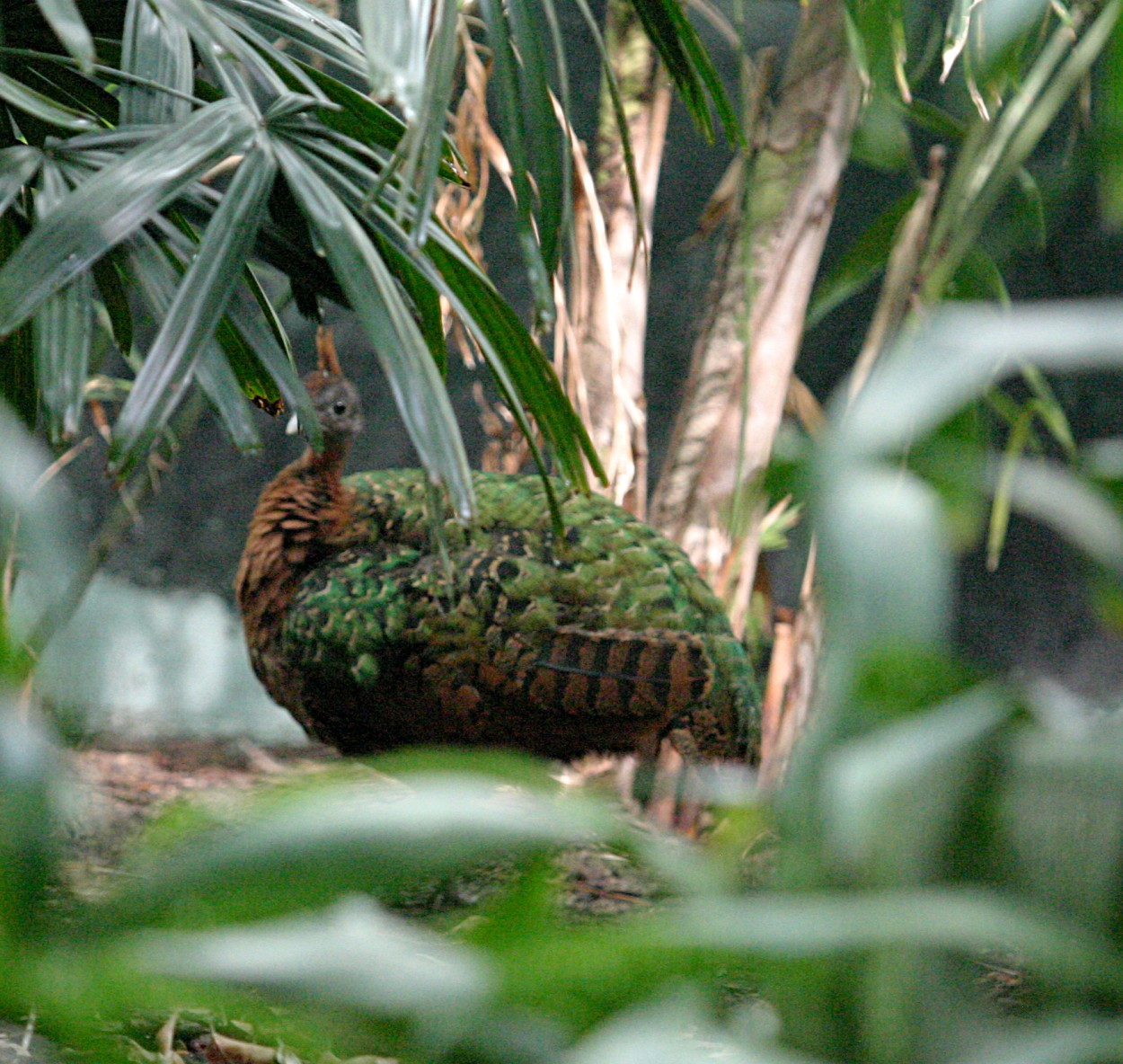
Female at the Milwaukee County Zoological Gardens

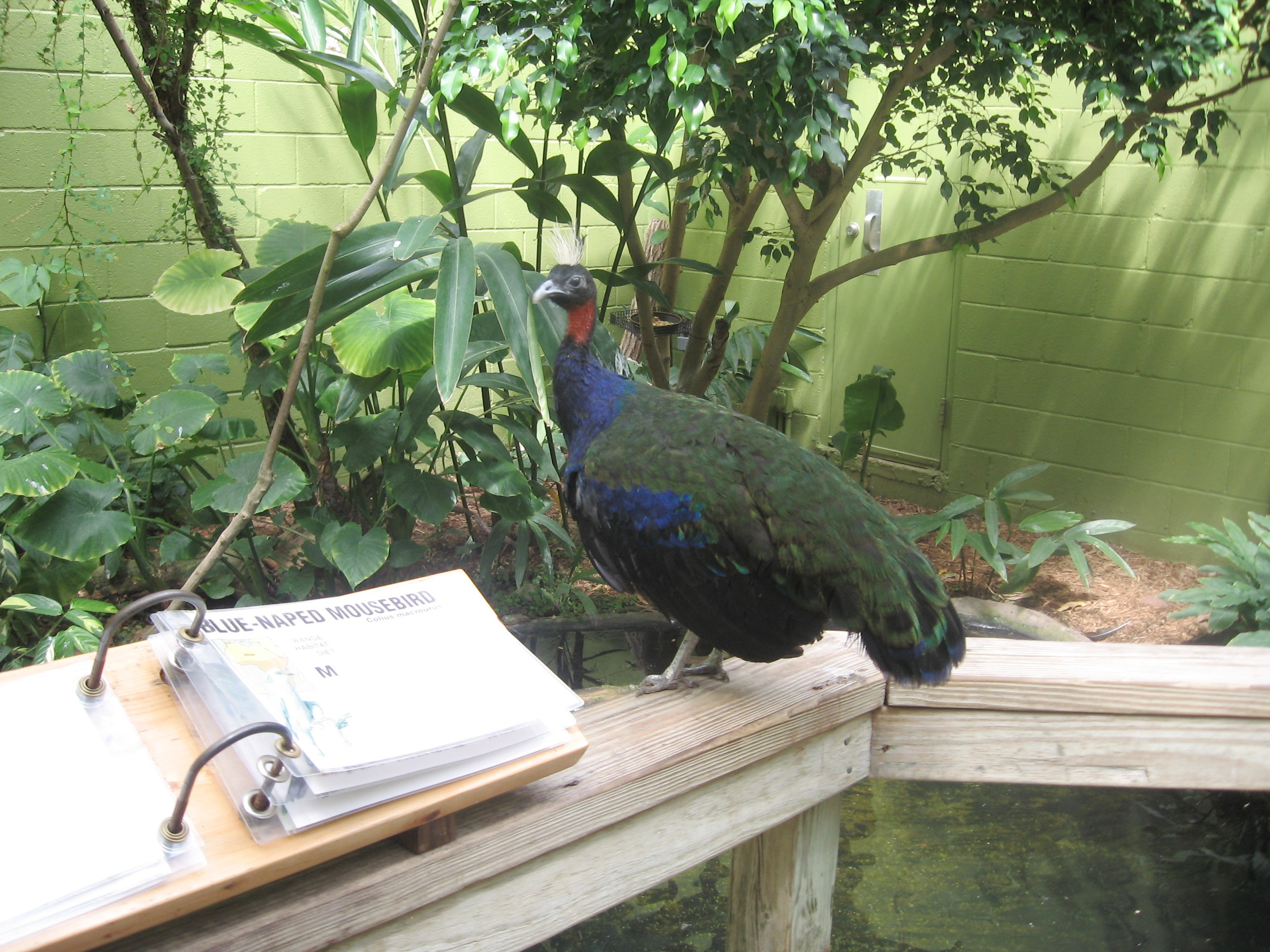
Male at the Oklahoma City Zoo

The Congo peafowl is listed as near threatened on the IUCN Red List. As of 2013, the wild population was estimated at between 2,500 and 9,000 adult individuals. Given its use of regenerating forest in Salonga National Park, secondary forests might be an important habitat to include in a conservation strategy.

Captive breeding programs were initiated in the Belgian Antwerp Zoo and at Salonga National Park.
