= Avatar =

Incarnation of a god on Earth in Hinduism

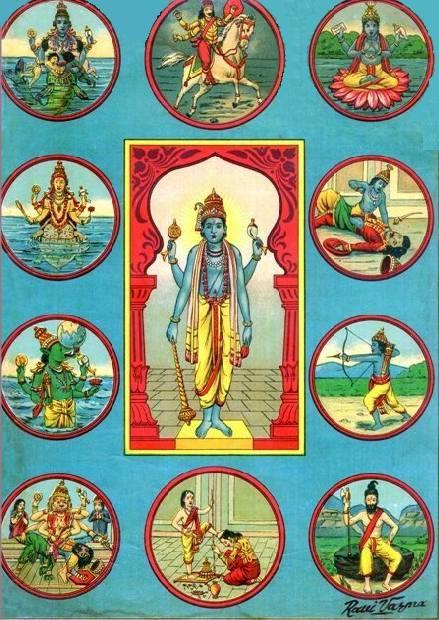
Present image. Description: "Hindu god Vishnu (centre) surrounded by his ten major avatars (Krishna-Buddha version). Anticlockwise from top left: Matsya; Kurma; Varaha; Narasimha; Vamana; Parashurama; Rama; Krishna; Buddha and Kalki"

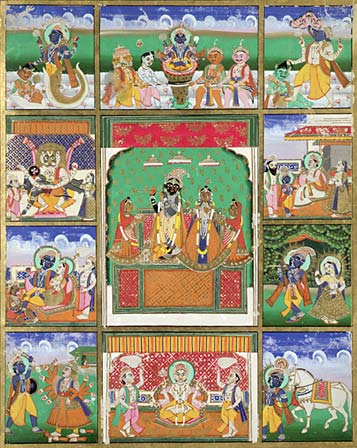
Proposal: "Vishnu with his 10 avatars (incarnations): Fish, Tortoise, Boar, Man-Lion, Dwarf, Rama with the Ax, King Rama, Krishna, Buddha, and Kalkin. Painting from Jaipur, India, 19th century; the Victoria and Albert Museum, London. Opaque watercolour on paper. Height: 48.3 cm, Width: 39.5 cm. Acquired by the Indian Museum and transferred to the South Kensington Museum in 1879."

Avatar (Sanskrit: अवतार, IAST: Avatāra; pronounced [ɐʋɐt̪aːɾɐ]) is a concept within Hinduism that in Sanskrit literally means 'descent'. It signifies the material appearance or incarnation of a powerful deity, or spirit on Earth, including in human form.

The word avatar does not appear in the Vedic literature; however, it appears in developed forms in post-Vedic literature, and as a noun particularly in the Puranic literature after the 6th century CE. Despite that, the concept of an avatar is compatible with the content of the Vedic literature like the Upanishads as it is symbolic imagery of the Saguna Brahman concept in the philosophy of Hinduism. The Rigveda describes Indra as endowed with a mysterious power of assuming any form at will. The Bhagavad Gita expounds the doctrine of Avatara but with terms other than avatar. Theologically, the term is most often associated with the Hindu god Vishnu, though the idea has been applied to other deities. Varying lists of avatars of Vishnu appear in Hindu scriptures, including the ten Dashavatara of the Garuda Purana and the twenty-two avatars in the Bhagavata Purana, though the latter adds that the incarnations of Vishnu are innumerable. The avatars of Vishnu are important in the theology of Vaishnavism. In the goddess-based Shaktism tradition of Hinduism, avatars of the Devi in different appearances such as Tripura Sundari, Durga, Chandi, Chamunda, Mahakali, and Kali are commonly found. While avatars of other deities such as Ganesha and Shiva are also mentioned in medieval Hindu texts, this is minor and occasional. The avatar doctrine is an important distinction in Vaishnavism and one that is absent from Shaivism, another major Hindu movement.

Incarnation concepts that are in some aspects similar to avatar are also found in Buddhism, Christianity, and other religions.

The scriptures of Sikhism include the names of numerous Hindu gods and goddesses, but it rejected the doctrine of savior incarnation and endorsed the view of Hindu Bhakti movement saints such as Namdev, that formless eternal god is within the human heart, and man is his own savior.

== Etymology and meaning ==
The Sanskrit noun (avatāra, Hindustani: [əʋˈtaːr]) is derived from the Sanskrit prefix ava- 'down' and the root tṛ 'to cross over'. These roots trace back, states Monier-Williams, to -taritum, -tarati, -rītum.

Avatar means 'descent, alight, to make one's appearance', and refers to the embodiment of the essence of a superhuman being or a deity in another form. The word also implies "to overcome, to remove, to bring down, to cross something". In Hindu traditions, the "crossing or coming down" is symbolism, states Daniel Bassuk, of the divine descent from "eternity into the temporal realm, from unconditioned to the conditioned, from infinitude to finitude". An avatar, states Justin Edwards Abbott, is a saguna (with form, attributes) embodiment of the nirguna Brahman or Atman (soul). Avatar, according to Bhaktisiddhanta Sarasvati actually means 'divine descent' in his commentaries of The Shrimad Bhagavatam and The Bramha Samhita (mentioned in Brahmavaivarta Purana).

Neither the Vedas nor the Principal Upanishads ever mention the word avatar as a noun. The verb roots and form, such as avatarana, appear in ancient post-Vedic Hindu texts, but as "action of descending", but not as an incarnated person (avatara). The related verb avatarana is, states Paul Hacker, used with double meaning, one as action of the divine descending, another as "laying down the burden of man" suffering from the forces of evil.

The term is most commonly found in the context of the Hindu god Vishnu. The earliest mention of Vishnu manifested in a human form to establish Dharma on Earth, uses other terms such as the word sambhavāmi in verse 4.6 and the word tanu in verse 9.11 of the Bhagavad Gita, as well as other words such as akriti and rupa elsewhere. It is in medieval era texts, those composed after the sixth century CE, that the noun version of avatar appears, where it means embodiment of a deity. The idea proliferates thereafter, in the Puranic stories for many deities, and with ideas such as ansha-avatar or partial embodiments.

The Gita and Bhagavata Purana state the purpose of God descending is to protect righteousness and get rid of unrighteousness. The Bhagavata Purana expands that God does not have a need to descend, but it is lila, akin to an overflow of joy.

The term avatar, in colloquial use, is also an epithet or a word of reverence for any extraordinary human being who is revered for his or her ideas. In some contexts, the term avatara just means a 'landing place, site of sacred pilgrimage', or just 'achieve one's goals after effort', or retranslation of a text in another language. The term avatar is not unique to Hinduism even though the term originated with Hinduism. It is found in the Trikaya doctrine of Mahayana Buddhism, in descriptions for the Dalai Lama in Tibetan Buddhism, and many ancient cultures.

=== Avatar versus incarnation ===
The manifest embodiment is sometimes referred to as an incarnation. The translation of avatar as "incarnation" has been questioned by Christian theologians, who state that an incarnation is in flesh and imperfect, while avatar is mythical and perfect. The theological concept of Christ as an incarnation, as found in Christology, presents the Christian concept of incarnation. The term avatar in Hinduism refers to act of various gods taking form to perform a particular task which in most of the times is bringing dharma back. The concept of avatar is widely accepted all over the India. Sheth disagrees and states that this claim is an incorrect understanding of the Hindu concept of avatar. (Note: Buddha, a real person, is included as an avatar of Vishnu in many Hindu texts.) Avatars are embodiments of spiritual perfection, driven by noble goals, in Hindu traditions such as Vaishnavism.

=== As a loanword ===
Following 19th Century Western interest in Indian culture and Hinduism, the word "Avatar" was taken as loanword into English and other Western languages, where it is used in various contexts and meanings, often considerably different from its original meaning in Hinduism - see Avatar (disambiguation).

== Avatars of Vishnu ==
The concept of avatar within Hinduism is most often associated with Vishnu, the preserver or sustainer aspect of God within the Hindu Trinity or Trimurti of Brahma, Vishnu and Shiva. Vishnu's avatars descend to empower the good and fight evil, thereby restoring Dharma. Traditional Hindus see themselves not as "Hindu", but as Vaishnava (Worshippers of Vishnu), Shaiva (Worshippers of Shiva), or Shakta (Worshipper of the Shakti). Each of the deities has its own iconography and mythology, but common to all is the fact that the divine reality has an explicit form, a form that the worshipper can behold. An oft-quoted passage from the Bhagavad Gita describes the typical role of an avatar of Vishnu:

Whenever and wherever there is a decline in religious practice (Dharma), O descendant of Bharata (Arjuna), and a predominant rise of irreligion (Adharma) – at that time I descend Myself.
To deliver the pious and to annihilate the miscreants, as well as to reestablish the principles of religion, I Myself appear, millennium after millennium.

— Bhagavad Gita 4.7–8 (Translation from Bhagavad Gita As It Is)

The Vishnu avatars appear in Hindu mythology whenever the cosmos is in crisis, typically because evil has grown stronger and has thrown the cosmos out of its balance. The avatar then appears in a material form, to destroy evil and its sources, and restore the cosmic balance between the ever-present forces of good and evil.

The most known and celebrated avatars of Vishnu, within the Vaishnavism traditions of Hinduism, are Krishna and Rama, as well as Venkateswara. These names have extensive literature associated with them, each has its own characteristics, legends and associated arts. The Mahabharata, for example, includes Krishna, while the Ramayana includes Rama.

=== Dashavatara ===
The Bhagavata Purana describes Vishnu's avatars as innumerable, though ten of his incarnations, the Dashavatara, are celebrated therein as his major appearances. The ten major Vishnu avatars are mentioned in the Agni Purana, the Garuda Purana and the Bhagavata Purana.

The ten best known avatars of Vishnu are collectively known as the Dashavatara (a Sanskrit compound meaning "ten avatars"). Five different lists are included in the Bhagavata Purana, where the difference is in the sequence of the names. Freda Matchett states that this re-sequencing by the composers may be intentional, so as to avoid implying priority or placing something definitive and limited to the abstract.

The Avatars of Vishnu
Name	Form	Key Role
Matsya	Fish	He saves Manu and the seven sages from the cosmic flood, and in some traditions, saves the Vedas from an asura called Hayagriva.
Kurma (Note: Mohini, the female avatar of Vishnu, appears in stories about the Kurma avatar.)	Tortoise /turtle	He supports the mountain named Mandara while the devas and the asuras churn the ocean of milk to produce the nectar of immortality.
Varaha	Boar	He rescues Bhumi, the goddess of the earth, when the asura Hiranyaksha abducts her, restoring her rightful place in the universe.
Narasimha	Man-Lion	He saves his devotee Prahlada and frees the three worlds from the tyranny of an asura named Hiranyakashipu.
Vamana	Dwarf	He vanquishes the asura king Mahabali to the netherworld after taking three strides upon the universe, restoring the rule of Indra.
Parashurama	Warrior-Sage	He destroys the oppressive kings of the military class and creates a new social order.
Rama	The ideal king	He rescues his wife Sita when she is abducted by the rakshasa king Ravana, restoring just rule to the world.
Balarama (debated)		The elder brother of Krishna and the god of agriculture. He is variously described as an avatar of Shesha, the serpent-mount of Vishnu, and an avatar of Vishnu.
Krishna	Divine Teacher	The eighth avatar of Vishnu who incarnates to re-establish righteousness in the world. He slays Kamsa, the tyrant of Mathura and his uncle, and participates in the Kurukshetra War as the charioteer of Arjuna.
Buddha	Enlightened One	The historical Buddha, who incarnates to delude the asuras from the path of the Vedas, ensuring the victory of the devas. In some traditions, he is referred to as an avatar of Vishnu.
Kalki	Future Warrior	The prophesied tenth avatar of Vishnu. He incarnates to bring an end to the present age of corruption called the Kali Yuga, re-establishing the four classes and law to the world.

=== Longer alternatives ===
The Bhagavata Purana also goes on to give an alternate list, wherein it numerically lists out 23 Vishnu avatars in chapter 1.3.

1. Four Kumaras (Catuḥsana): the four sons of Brahma who exemplify the path of devotion.
2. Varaha: The boar avatar. He rescues Bhumi, the goddess of the earth, when the asura Hiranyaksha abducts her, restoring her rightful place in the universe.
3. Narada: the divine-sage who travels the worlds as a devotee of Vishnu.
4. Nara-Narayana: the twin-sages.
5. Kapila: a renowned sage spoken of in the Mahabharata, son of Kardama and Devahuti. He is sometimes identified with the founder of the Samkhya school of philosophy.
6. Dattatreya: the combined avatar of the Hindu trinity of Brahma, Vishnu, and Shiva.
7. Yajna: the embodiment of sacrifices.
8. Rishabha: the father of emperor Bharata.
9. Prithu: the sovereign-king who milked the earth as a cow to obtain the world's grain and vegetation.
10. Matsya: The fish avatar. He saves Manu and the seven sages from the cosmic flood, and in some traditions, saves the Vedas from an asura called Hayagriva.
11. Kurma: The tortoise/turtle avatar. He supports the mountain named Mandara while the devas and the asuras churn the ocean of milk to produce the nectar of immortality.
12. Dhanvantari: the father of Ayurvedic medicine and a physician to the devas.
13. Mohini: the enchantress who beguiles the asuras into offering her the elixir of eternal life.
14. Narasimha: The lion avatar. He saves his devotee Prahlada and frees the three worlds from the tyranny of an asura named Hiranyakashipu.
15. Vamana: The dwarf avatar. He vanquishes the asura king Mahabali to the netherworld after taking three strides upon the universe, restoring the rule of Indra.
16. Parashurama: The warrior-sage avatar. He destroys the oppressive kings of the military class and creates a new social order.
17. Rama: The prince avatar. He rescues his wife Sita when she is abducted by the rakshasa king Ravana, restoring just rule to the world.
18. Vyasa: the compiler of the Vedas and writer of the scriptures (Puranas) and the epic Mahabharata.
19. Krishna: The eighth avatar of Vishnu who incarnates to re-establish righteousness in the world. He slays Kamsa, the tyrant of Mathura and his uncle, and participates in the Kurukshetra War as the charioteer of Arjuna.
20. Gautama Buddha: The historical Buddha, who incarnates to delude the asuras from the path of the Vedas, ensuring the victory of the devas. In some traditions, he is referred to as an avatar of Vishnu.
21. Kalki: The prophesied tenth avatar of Vishnu. He incarnates to bring an end to the present age of corruption called the Kali Yuga, re-establishing the four classes and law to the world.

Avatars like Hayagriva, Hamsa, and Garuda are also mentioned in the Pancharatra, making a total of forty-six avatars. However, despite these lists, the commonly accepted number of ten avatars for Vishnu was fixed well before the 10th century CE. Madhvacharya also regards Gautama Buddha as an avatar of Vishnu.

=== Types ===
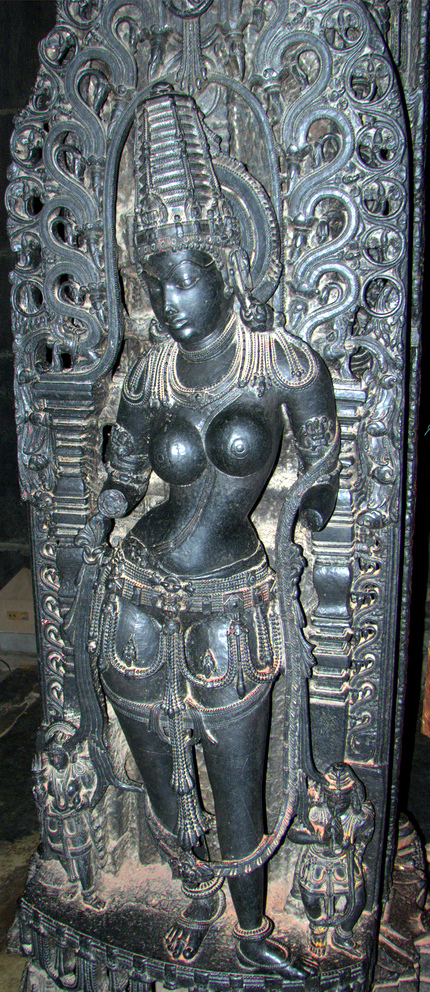
Mohini, the female avatar of Vishnu (statue at Belur temple, Karnataka.)

The avatar concept was further developed and refined in later Hindu texts. One approach was to identify full avatars and partial avatars. Krishna, Rama, and Narasimha were full avatars (purna avatars), while others were partial avatars (ansha avatars). Some declared, states Noel Sheth, that every living creature is an avatar of Vishnu. The Pancharatra text of Vaishnavism declares that Vishnu's avatars include those that are direct and complete (sakshad), indirect and endowed (avesha), cosmic and salvific (vyuha), inner and inspirational (antaryamin), consecrated and in the form of image (archa).

Yet another classification, developed in Krishna schools, centers around Guna-avatars, Purusha-avatars and Lila-avatars, with their subtypes. The Guna-avatar classification of avatars is based on the Guṇas concept of the Samkhya school of Hindu philosophy, that is Rajas (Brahma), Sattva (Vishnu), and Tamas (Shiva). These personalities of the Trimurti are referred to as Guna avatars. The Purushavatara are three. The first evolves all matter (Prakriti), the second is the soul present in each individual creature, the third is the interconnected oneness or Brahman that connects all souls. The Lilavataras are partial or full manifestations of Vishnu, where either some powers (Shakti) or material parts of him exist.

Vishnu is Purushavatara. The Matsya, Kurma, and Vamana avatars of Vishnu are Lilavataras. A Purnarupa in this classification, is when Vishnu manifests completely along with his qualities and powers. In Bengal Vaishnavism, Krishna is the Purnarupa. In Shaivism, Bhairava is the purnarupa of Shiva.

=== In Sikhism ===
24 avatars of Vishnu are mentioned in Bachitar Natak's composition in Dasam Granth, the second scripture of Sikhism written by Guru Gobind Singh:

1. Mach (Matsya)
2. Kach (Kurma)
3. Nara (Nara in Nara-Narayana)
4. Narayan (Narayana in Nara-Narayana)
5. Maha Mohini (Mohini)
6. Bairaha (Varaha)
7. Nar Singha (Narasimha)
8. Baman (Vamana)
9. Parshuram (Parashurama)
10. Bramma (Brahma)
11. Balram (Balarama)
12. Jalandhar (Jalandhara)
13. Bishan (Vishnu)
14. Sheshayi (Shesha)
15. Arihant Dev (Arihanta)
16. Manu Raja (Manu)
17. Dhanvantari (Dhanvantari)
18. Suraj (Surya)
19. Chandar (Chandra)
20. Ram (Rama)
21. Kishan (Krishna)
22. Nar (Arjuna)
23. Rudra (Shiv)
24. Kalki (Kalki)

Dasam Granth has three major compositions, one each dedicated to avatars of Vishnu (Chaubis avatar) and Brahma. However, Sikhism rejects the doctrine of savior incarnation, and only accepts the abstract nirguna formless god. The Sikh Gurus endorsed the view of Hindu Bhakti movement saints such as Namdev (≈1270 – 1350 CE) that formless eternal god is within the human heart and man is his own savior.

The Guru Granth Sahib reverentially includes the names of numerous Hindu deities, including Vishnu avatars such as Krishna, Hari, and Rama, as well those of Devi as Durga.

=== In Isma'ilism ===
The Gupti Ismailis, who observe pious circumspection as Hindus, uphold that the first Shi‘i Imam, ‘Ali b. Abi Talib, as well as his descendants through the line of Isma‘il, are collectively Kalki, the tenth and final avatāra of Vishnu. According to this interpretation, these figures represent the continuity of divine guidance to humankind. In the view of some Guptis, this is corroborated by the Quranic verse 14:4 which mentions the idea that God had sent a messenger to every land. They understand the avatāras to be these messengers sent by God to their people in the Indian subcontinent.

== Avatars of Shiva ==
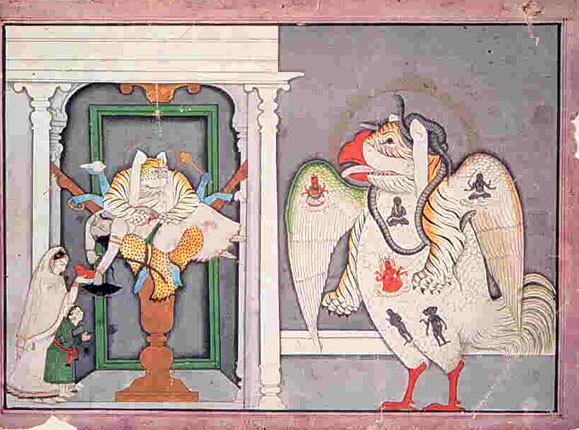
Sharabha (right) with Narasimha (18th-century painting, Pahari/Kangra School)

Although Puranic scriptures contain occasional references to avatars of Shiva, the avatar doctrine is neither universally accepted nor commonly adopted in Shaivism. The views on the doctrine of incarnation has been one of the significant doctrinal differences between Vaishnavism and Shaivism, in addition to their differences on the role of householder life versus monastic life for spiritual release. Shaivism is a transcendental theology, where man, with the help of his Guru, is his own savior.

The Linga Purana lists twenty-eight avatars of Shiva. In the Shiva Purana there is a distinctly Shaivite version of a traditional avatar myth: Shiva brings forth Virabhadra, one of his terrifying forms, in order to calm Narasimha, an avatar of Vishnu. When that fails, Shiva manifests as the human-lion-bird Sharabha which calms down lion-man Narasimha avatar of Vishnu, and Shiva then gives Vishnu a chakra (not to be confused with Sudarshan Chakra) as gift. A similar story is told in the late medieval era Sharabha Upanishad. However, Vaishnava Dvaita school refutes this Shaivite view of Narasimha. According to the Shiva Purana, Shiva has 19 avatars:

1. Pippalada
2. Nandi
3. Virabhadra
4. Sharabha
5. Ashwatthama
6. Bhairava
7. Durvasa
8. Grihapati
9. Hanuman
10. Vrishabha
11. Yatinatha
12. Krishnadarshana
13. Bhikshuvarya
14. Sureshwara
15. Kirateshwara
16. Suntantarka
17. Brahmachari
18. Yaksheshwara
19. Avadhuta

According to the Kurma Purana, he has 28.

The vanara god Hanuman who helped Rama (the Vishnu avatar) is considered by some to be the eleventh avatar of Rudra (Shiva). Some regional deities like Khandoba are also believed by some to be avatars of Shiva. Ashwatthama, the son of Drona is also considered to be an avatar of Shiva.

Shesha and his avatars (Balarama and Lakshmana) are occasionally linked to Shiva. Adi Shankara, the formulator of Advaita Vedanta, is also occasionally regarded as an avatar of Shiva.

In Dasam Granth, Guru Gobind Singh mentioned two avatars of Rudra: Dattatreya Avatar and Parasnath Avatar.

== Avatars of Devis ==
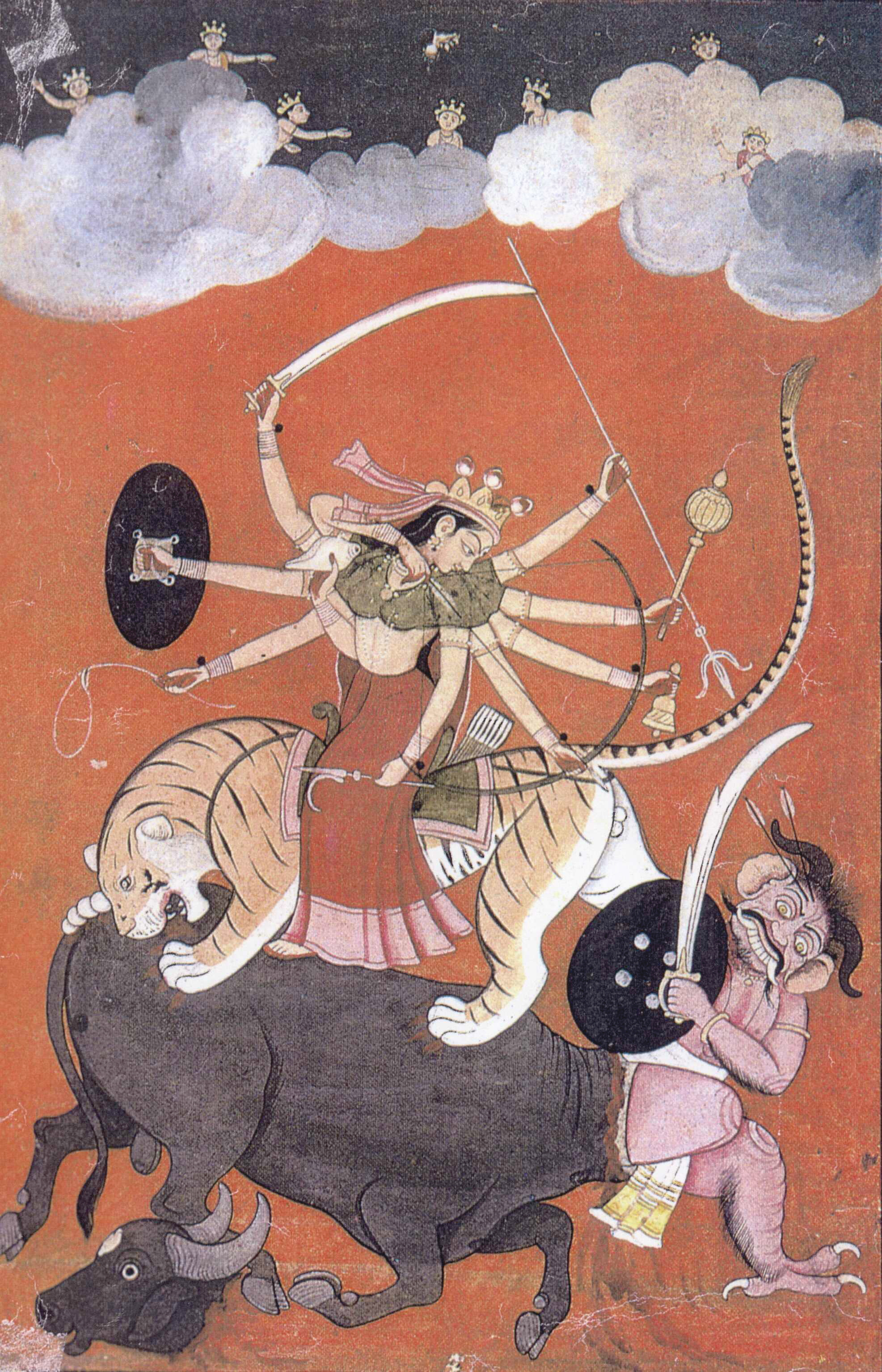
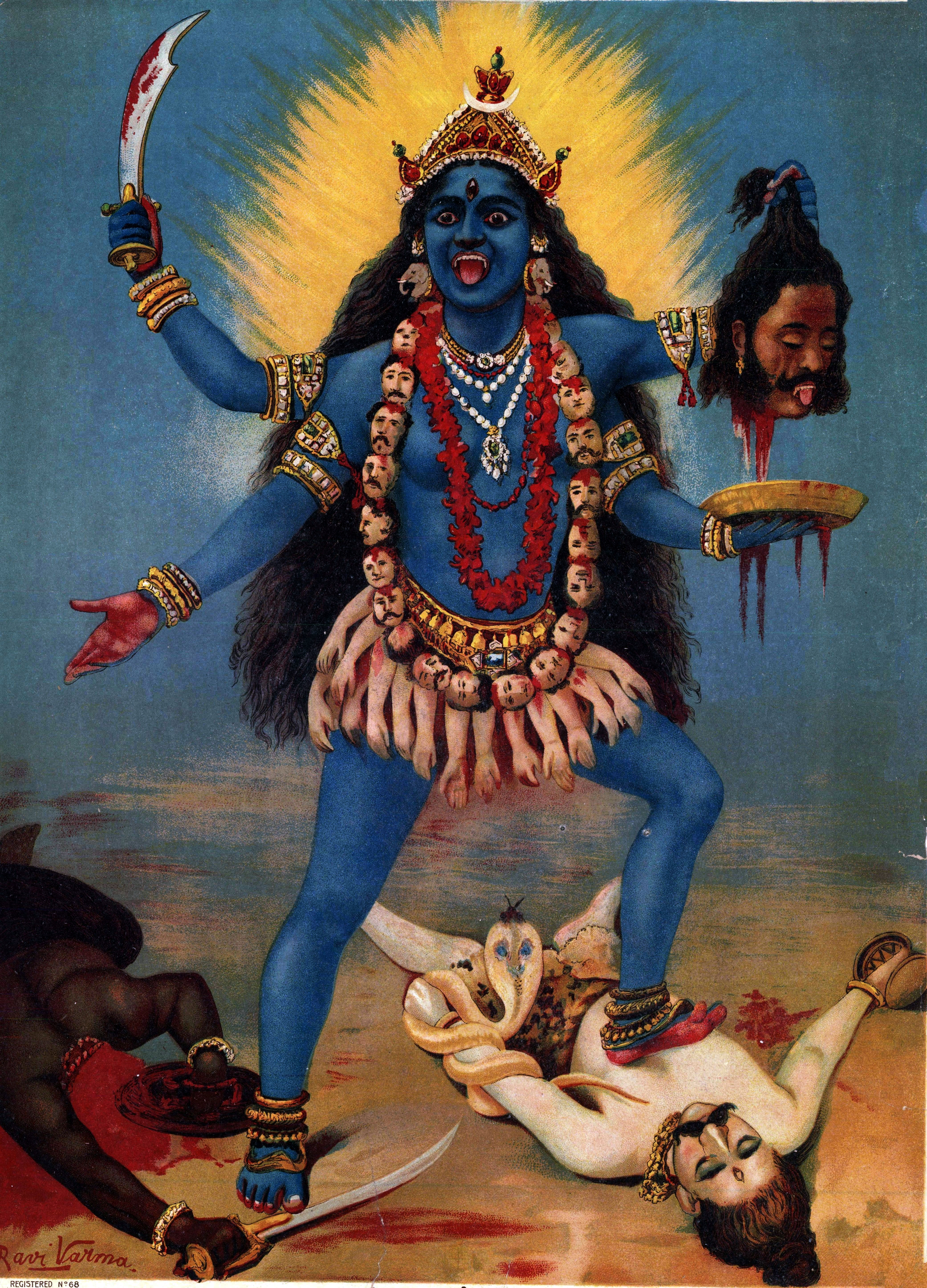
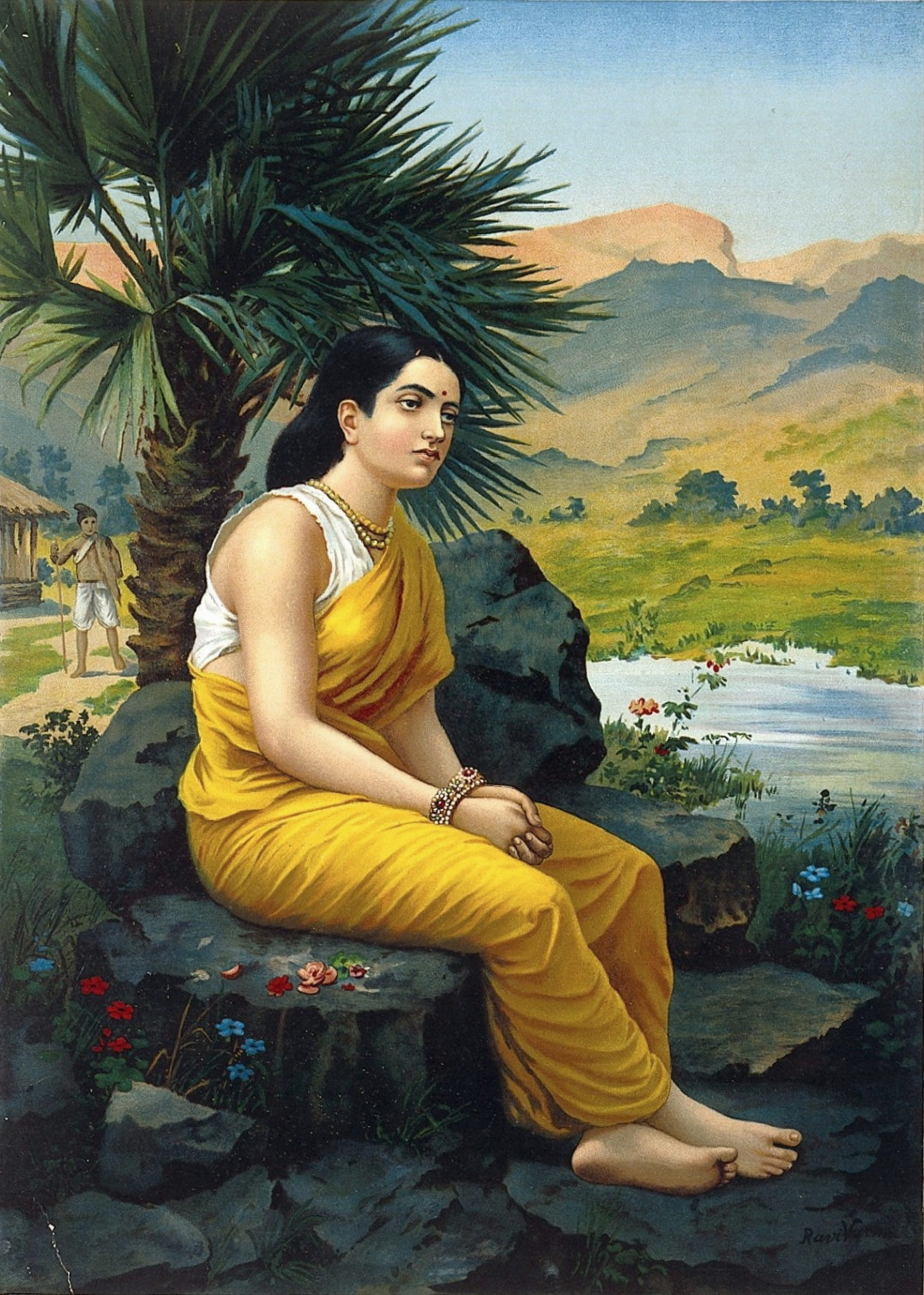
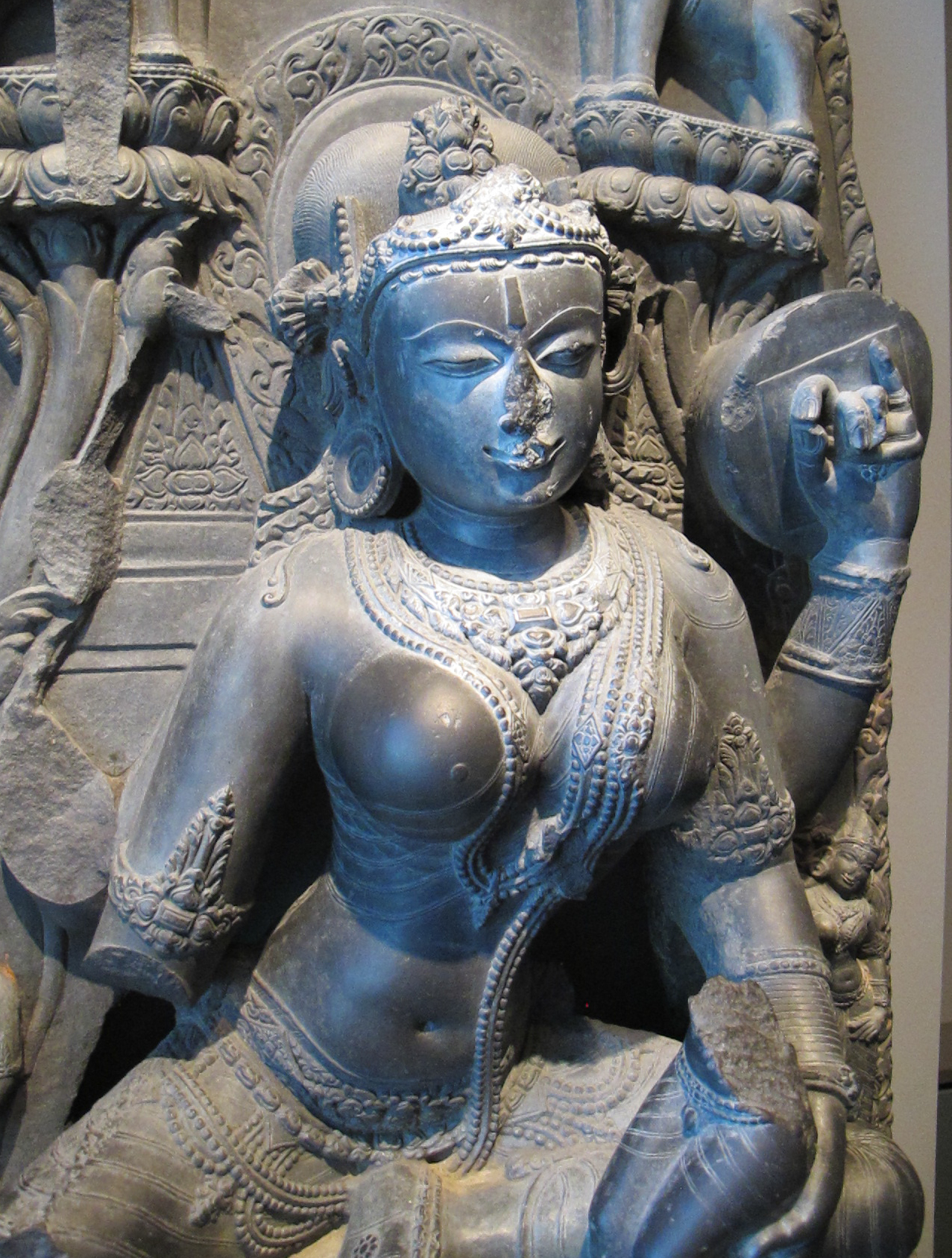
Avatars of Devi. Clockwise from upper left: Durga, Kali, Parvati and Sita.

Avatars are also observed in Shaktism, the sect dedicated to the worship of the Goddess (Devi), but they do not have universal acceptance in the sect. The Devi Bhagavata Purana describes the descent of Devi avatars to punish the wicked and defend the righteous as – much as the Bhagavata Purana does with the avatars of Vishnu.

Nilakantha, an 18th-century commentator on the Devi Bhagavata Purana – which includes the Devi Gita – says that various avatars of the Goddess includes Shakambhari and even the masculine Krishna and Rama – generally thought to be Vishnu's avatars. Parvati, Lakshmi and Saraswati are main goddesses worshipped as Devi avatars.

=== Avatars of Parvati ===
Devi is popular in her form as Parvati. In Devi Mahatmya she is seen as the Goddess Mahakali, and in Uma Samhita, she is seen as Devi herself. Regarding her incarnations, it varies per sect in Hinduism. She could be all Goddesses as said in Shaivism and some main Shaktism interpretations like the Sri kula and Kali Kula families, or just a form of Devi in some other Shaktism interpretations and many Vaishnava interpretations. With this in mind, Parvati's forms include:

- Mahakali
- Sati
- Durga

==== Mahavidyas ====
- Kali
- Tara
- Tripurasundari
- Bhuvaneshvari
- Bhairavi
- Chinnamasta
- Dhumavati
- Bagalamukhi
- Matangi
- Kamalatmika

Shakta pithas

==== Navadurgas ====
- Shailaputri
- Brahmacharini
- Chandraghanta
- Kushmanda
- Skandamata
- Katyayani
- Kaalratri
- Mahagauri
- Siddhidhatri

==== Others ====
- Annapurna
- Bhadrakali
- Jayadurga
- Kaushiki/Mahasaraswati
- Chandi
- Maheshwari/Rudrani
- Chamunda
- Ambika/Mahalakshmi
- Mahakali
- Shitala
- Pratyangira
- Vanadurga
- Ardhanarishvara
- Bhramari
- Shatakshi/Shakambhari
- Raktadantika
- Tvarita
- Vasavi Kanyaka Parameshvari
- Shivaduti
- Vindhyavasini/Nandā
- Indrakshi
- Draupadi

==== In North India ====
- Khodiyar
- Bahuchara Mata

==== East India ====
- Dakshina Kali
- Kamakhya
- Jagaddhatri
- Bipodtarini
- Gandheswari

==== South India ====
- Meenakshi
- Vishalakshi
- Kamakshi
- Abhirami
- Mookambika
- Akilandeswari
- Mariamman
- Karumariamman
- Angala Devi
- Kateri Amman
- Periyachi

All of these incarnations helped provide security to the world and even brought Shiva into the participation of worldly affairs.

=== Avatars of Lakshmi ===
Like Vishnu, his consort Lakshmi incarnates as in many forms to help provide order and to enlighten the world with her consort. She has many forms, and just like Parvati, some of her forms are not consistent throughout all sects and interpretations of Hinduism. In Vaishnavism and some interpretations of Shaktism, Lakshmi is seen as Devi herself. She could be every Goddess as said in Vaishnavism and some interpretations of Shaktism, or just another form of Devi as seen in other interpretations of Shaktism and in Shaivism. With this in mind, Lakshmi's forms include:

- Mahalakshmi
- Forms at 108 Divya Desam

==== Ashtalakshmi ====
- Adi Lakshmi, Dhanya Lakshmi, Dhana Lakshmi, Gaja Lakshmi, Santana Lakshmi, Vidya Lakshmi, Veera Lakshmi, Vijaya Lakshmi

==== With avatars of Vishnu ====
- Sita
- Radha
- Ashtasakhi
- Gopi
- Dharani (with Parashurama)
- Rukmini/Ashtabharya
- Junior wives of Krishna
- Padmavati
- Lakshmi Narayana
- Andal
- Ranganayaki
- Dhriti (with Kapila)
- Chottanikkara Bhagavathy
- Jaganmata/Vimala (with Jagannath)
- Vaishno Devi (with Kalki)
- Archi

=== Singular forms ===
- Vedavati
- Chandralamba Parameshwari
- Mookambika
- Vasavi Kanyaka Parameshvari
- Harshat Mata
- Devi Kanya Kumari
- Tulasi
- Vishvambhari
- Bhramari
- Sinivali
- Dadhimati Mata
- Mahalakshmi Ambabai
- Gayatri
- Shakambhari
- Durga
- Ambika (goddess)

==== Matrikas ====
- Vaishnavi
- Varahi
- Narasimhi

==== 3 aspects of Mahalakshmi in Sri Vaishnava ====
- Sri
- Bhumi
- Nila

==== Other ====
- Draupadi
- Subhadra

=== Avatars of Saraswati ===
Saraswati is a prominent goddess in Hindu mythology, revered as the patroness of knowledge, arts, music, wisdom, and speech. While she is popularly known as the creative power (Shakti) of her consort Brahma, her status and significance vary across different Hindu sects. In some interpretations of Shaktism, she is seen as one of the ten Mahavidyas, or great wisdom goddesses, and is considered an aspect of Devi herself. As Mahasaraswati, she represents the creative and intellectual power of the supreme goddess. In Vaishnavism, she is sometimes associated with helping Vishnu to restore cosmic order by safeguarding the Vedas. On the other hand, in many Shaivite and some other Shaktism interpretations, she is viewed as one of the many forms of Devi. With this in mind, Saraswati's forms include:

- Mahasaraswati
- Vagdevi
- Gayatri
- Brahmani
- Mookambika
- Vidya
- Sharada
- Savitri
- Nila Saraswati

== Avatars of Brahma ==
In Dasam Granth, second scriptures of Sikhs written by Guru Gobind Singh, mentioned seven Brahma Avatars.

1. Valmiki
2. Kashyapa
3. Shukra
4. Baches
5. Vyasa
6. Khat
7. Kalidasa

Khat avatar in this list refers to six different scholars who are considered to be founders of six schools of Indian philosophy. According to the Skanda Purana, Brahma incarnated himself as Yajnavalkya in response to a curse from Shiva.

== Avatars of Ganesha ==
The Linga Purana declares that Ganesha incarnates to destroy demons and to help the gods and pious people. The two Upapuranas – Ganesha Purana and Mudgala Purana – detail the avatars of Ganesha. Both these upapuranas are core scriptures of the Ganapatya sect – exclusively dedicated to Ganesha worship.

Four avatars of Ganesha are listed in the Ganesha Purana: Mohotkata, Mayūreśvara, Gajanana and Dhumraketu. Each avatar corresponds to a different yuga, has a different mount and different skin complexion, but all the avatars have a common purpose – to slay demons.

The Mudgala Puranam describes eight avatars of Ganesha:

1. Vakratunda (Vakratuṇḍa) ("twisting trunk"), his mount is a lion.
2. Ekadanta ("single tusk"), his mount is a mouse.
3. Mahodara ("big belly"), his mount is a mouse.
4. Gajavaktra (or Gajānana) ("elephant face"), his mount is a mouse.
5. Lambodara ("pendulous belly"), his mount is a mouse.
6. Vikata (Vikaṭa) ("unusual form", "misshapen"), his mount is a peacock.
7. Vighnaraja (Vighnarāja) ("king of obstacles"), his mount is the celestial serpent Śeṣa.
8. Dhumravarna (Dhūmravarṇa) ("grey color") corresponds to Śiva, his mount is a horse.

== Avatars of Varuna ==
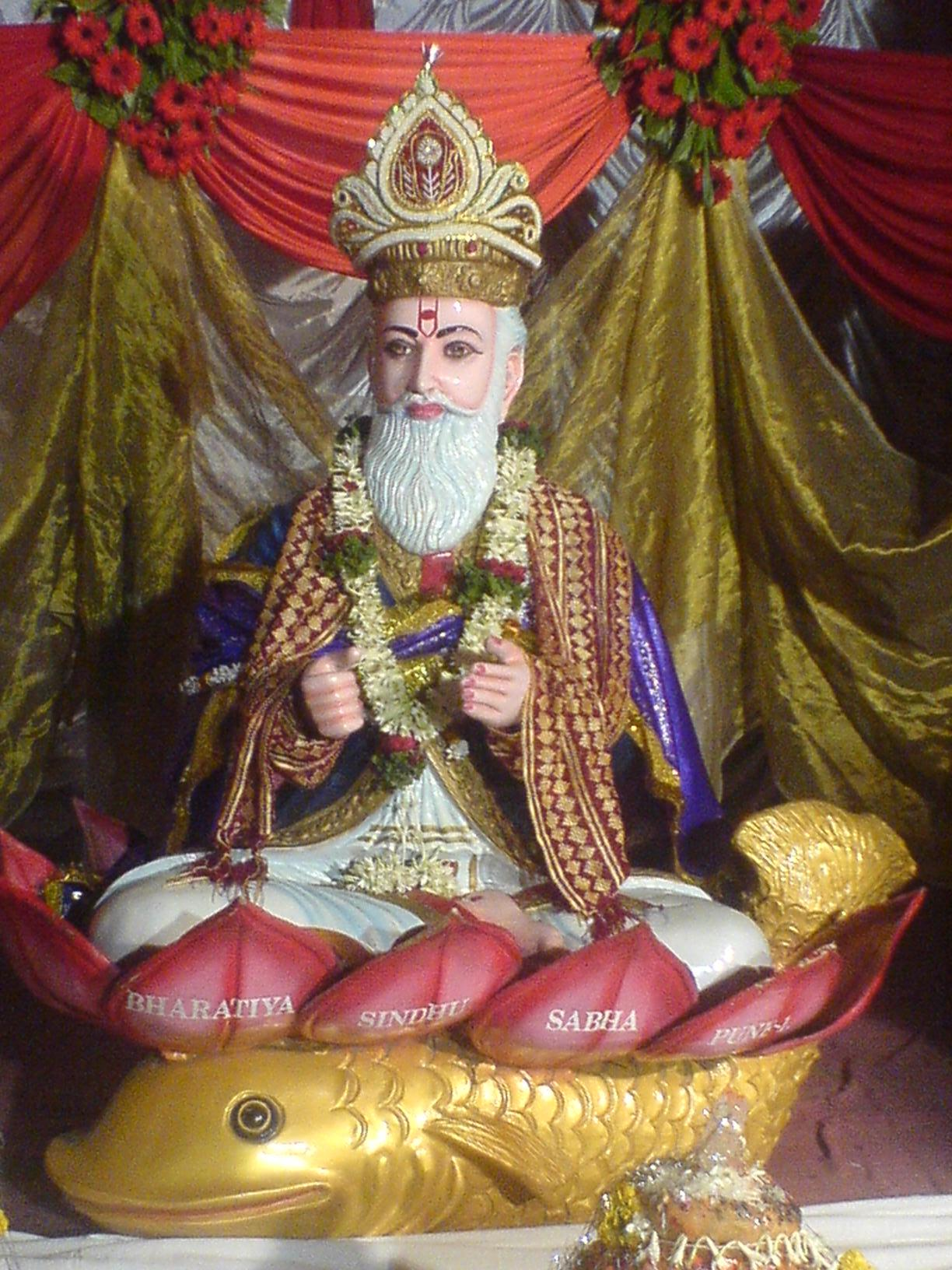
Jhulelal, incarnation of Varuna

Jhulelal, the Iṣṭa-devatā (most-revered deity) of Sindhi Hindus, is considered the incarnation of Varuna.

== See also ==
- Abatur
- List of avatars in the Mahabharata
- Dashavatara
- Gautama Buddha in Hinduism
- Chaubis Avtar
- Incarnation
- List of avatar claimants
- Hindu eschatology
