= Angalamman Temple =

Religion
- Affiliation: Hinduism
- District: Chennai
- Deity: Kasi Viswanatha, Angalamman and Virat Viswakarma

Location
- Location: Chennai
- State: Tamil Nadu
- Country: India

Angalamman Temple is a Hindu temple located in the neighbourhood of Choolai in Chennai, India. The temple has two separate shrines for Kasi Viswanatha, Angalamman and Virat Viswakarma. The temple is administered by the Ministry of Hindu Religious and Charitable Endowments of the Government of Tamil Nadu. The temple is one of the five holy shrines of the Viswakarma community in Chennai district.

== See also ==
- Angalaamman
- Ankalamma
- Angala Parameswari, a 2002 Tamil religious film.
