= Angalamman Temple, Kaveripakkam =

Angalamman Temple is a Hindu temple located in the town of Kaveripakkam in the Vellore district of Tamil Nadu, India. The temple is one of the earliest stone structures in Tamil Nadu and has remains of the Pallava and the early Medieval Chola period. The temple is dedicated to Angalamman.

== Architecture ==
While the temple is dedicated to Angalamman, the idol of Shiva is the most prominent and characteristic of the Shiva temples of the period. He is seated in the utkutikasana posture with the leaves of the Vedas in his hand.

== See also ==
- Angalaamman
- Ankalamma
- Angala Parameswari, a 2002 Tamil religious film.
