= Vipattāriṇī Chaṇḍībāṛi, Rājpur =

Hindu temple dedicated to goddess Bipadtarini in Rajpur, West Bengal, India

Bipadtarini Chandibari
- বিপত্তারিণী চণ্ডীবাড়ি
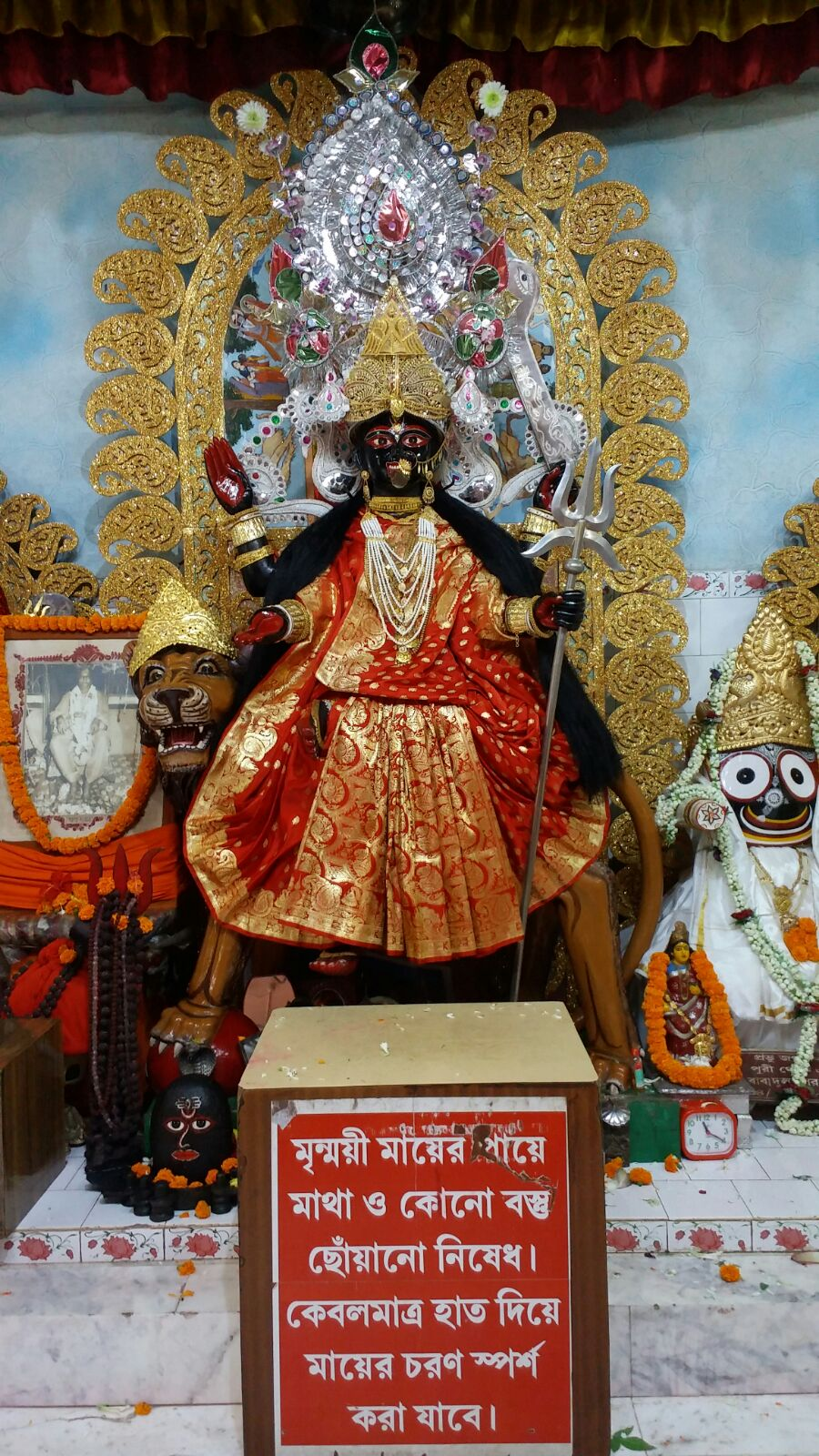
- Maa Bipadtarini

- Location in West Bengal

Religion
- Affiliation: Hinduism
- District: South 24 Parganas
- Deity: Bipadtarini Devi: Bipadtarini Puja; Rathyatra; Ulto Rath

Location
- Location: Rajpur Sonarpur
- State: West Bengal
- Country: India
- Coordinates: 22°25′37″N 88°24′44″E

Architecture
- Creator: Baba Dulal

Website
- Maa Bipadtarini Chandibari - Official Website

Bipadtarini Chandibari or Bipattarini Chandibari is a Hindu temple dedicated to the Hindu goddess Bipadtarini, one of the aspect goddess and 108 avatars of Maa Durga. Located on S.B. Das Road in Rajpur Sonarpur, South 24 Parganas in West Bengal, it is one of the few and most important shrines of Maa Bippatarini in the Indian subcontinent. Every year, the temple is visited by thousands of devotees from all over Bengal, who come here for her darshan and pray to her to protect them from all kinds of danger.

== History ==
The temple was established by Baba Dulal. Born as Dulal Chandra Das to father Sadhan Chandra Das and mother Basantakumari Das, he took interest in spirituality from a very young age. With time, he became a well known matri-sadhak and later, established a idol of Maa Bipattarini Chandi in his house.

Baba Dulal saw Maa Bipadtarini not in his dreams but with his open eyes in the disguise of a teenage girl. He started Bipattarini Brata and her worship in a new manner and always asked his followers to worship her as their mother, instead of a goddess. It is believed by her devotees that if someone is in any trouble, if he chants "Jay Maa Bipattarini Chandir Jay" 3 times, Maa will protect them from their trouble.

Another legend follows that he established the idol after getting swapnadesh from Maa Bipadtarini herself. She instructed him regarding how will be the appearance of her murti. Hence, he built her idol according to her instructions. She also told him regarding what her puja procedures will be and till today, those rituals are followed.

== Maa Bipadtarini ==
Maa Bipadtarini's idol is of dark complexion. Her vahana is a lion. The idol has 4 hands, each of which has a separate significance. The upper left hand holds a kharga, symbolising her anger and punishment for the wrongdoers. The lower left hand holds a trishul, symbolising her victory over the evil. Her upper right hand is posed in a aashirvad mudra for her devotees who perform good deeds while her lower right hand is posed in abhay mudra.

Baba Dulal meditated under a bel gach - bilwo briksha (Aegle marmelos) for 3 consecutive days. On the third day at dusk, he saw full grace Maa Bipattarini Chandi. After this incident, he started residing there along with his wife Shakti Sadhana Devi. That place is now known as the "Ratnabedi". Everyday the temple remains open to the devotees from 7:30 a.m. to 11 a.m. and in the evening from 5 p.m. to 6:30 p.m. Devotees believe that their wishes are fulfilled after praying to Maa Bipattarini.

== Puja rituals ==
Although devotees visit the temple everyday, large number of devotees visit the temple on Tuesdays and Saturdays, specially during the main puja week. They worship her with candles and incense sticks. The principle annual festival takes place in the month of Ashar (June–July) between the days of "Shukla dwitiya" and "Shukla dashami", according to the lunisolar Bengali Hindu calendar. Bipadtarini Chandi Brata is done to worship Maa Bipadtarini Chandi and take her blessings, so that she protects the worshipper and his or her family from all kinds of danger. The temple registers the highest number of crowds every year on this day.

The Brata utsav is also observed after Ratha Yatra and before Ulto Rath on the Tuesday and Saturday every year. Special pujas are conducted on these days, following the rituals of Bipattarini Puja. The Bipattarini Chandi Brata is followed by the devotees by eating only vegetarian and sattvic diet on the previous day of puja. The Brata also requires 13 pieces of every element required including flowers, amra pallab, supari, ghot, durba ghash, sish dab and others. After the person gives puja the next day, he or she breaks the fast by eating the 13 luchi along with 13 sweets and 13 fruits, which were offered to the deity as the prasad.

The number 13 is significant and auspicious in Bipadtarini Puja, contrary to the other houses of beliefs in Hinduism. In the Kurukshetra War, to protect the Pandavas and prevent herself from "vaidhvya", Draupadi worshipped Maa Gauri and tied 13 dhagas on the hands of each of the Pandavas. Following this ritual till today, the "puja dali" of Maa Bipadtarini is decorated with all the puja necessities each in 13 number. The rituals of Maa Bipadtarini puja with 13 essential elements each has also been mentioned in the Markandeya Purana.

13 types of fruits, 13 type of sweets, 13 luchis, 13 fried vegetable items, basanti pulao and many other food items are offered to the deity. The number 13 has a special significance. 12 fruits signifies the 12 months of a year and 1 fruit for the worshipper who is performing the rituals. Red coloured "dhagas" with 13 knots are tied on the hands of both men and women after they break their fast, as a Maa Bipattarini's symbol to protect them from any danger. Besides, special puja is also given to Maa Bipadtarini on the day of Navami of Durga Puja every year.

== Arati ==
One of the main spiritual attractions at the temple is the divine "Sandhya Arati". It starts at 5 after Shiv-ratri and then 4:30 in the evening. With the sound of dhak and knasha, the priest starts with preaching the vanis, followed by the Sandhya Arati. The divine grace of the Sandhya Arati is believed by her devotees to be an essential event to observe, even after worshipping the deity.

== Temple complex ==
The temple complex also houses deities of other Hindu gods and goddesses. To the left of Maa Bipadtarini Chandi is the idol of Lord Jagannath. On further left is the idol of Radha Krishna. On the right of Maa Bipadtarini Chandi is the picture of Baba Dulal, the establisher of the temple. On further right is a smaller idol of Maa Bipadtarini. On further right is a idol of Maa Kali. In the front right is a Shiva Lingam and in the front left is a small statue of Maa Lakshmi. In the front, at the centre of the main temple is a place where the bhog is served to the deities. At the base of the marble platform on which the idols of these deities are placed, are several other smaller idols of many other Hindu deities.

All around the temple, there are deities of several other Hindu gods and goddesses including Maa Durga killing the demon Mahishasura and Narasimha Bhagwan killing the demon Hiranyakashipu. In the temple complex, there is also a sub-temple dedicated to Baba Dulal and Shakti Sadhana Devi. Their white stone statues are established inside the temple.

The sacred Aegle marmelos tree is surrounded by a fence beyond which commoners cannot go. They have to worship it from outside the boundary. The base of the tree is covered by red marble stones and the tree base is adorned with garlands made of jasmine, yellow and orange marigold, rose, tuberose and chrysanthemum. Close to the Aegle marmelos tree is the house of Baba Dulal and his wife. The room in which he meditated has been maintained along with his belongings. Devotees visit the room after offering their puja to Maa Bipadtarini Chandi.
