= Tvarita =

Hindu goddess

- Affiliation: Shaktism, Tripura Sundari
- Weapon: Noose, elephant-goad
- Texts: Tantras
- Gender: Female

Tvarita (Sanskrit: त्वरिता, romanized: Tvaritā, lit. 'the swift one') is a goddess primarily featured in Tantric Hinduism. She is depicted to be a member of the group of fifteen yoginis called the nityas, and an aspect of Adi Parashakti.

== Iconography ==
Tvarita is depicted to be dark-complexioned. She has a crown on her head, which contains a peacock's tail. Her garments are made of leaves. She wears a necklace that is made of gunja flowers (rosary pea). The hem of her cloth, which is made of eight snakes, hangs down to the weight of her breasts. She is decked with armlets, a waist-chain, and anklets. She has three eyes, and has a fierce appearance. On one of her hands, she performs a gesture called the varada mudra, and on the other, the abhaya mudra.

== Legend ==
In her early sources, Tvarita is depicted to be a goddess who was best known for saving the lives of the victims of snakebites. She was eventually assimilated and identified with the goddesses of Durga and Kali. Tvarita is conceived as a tribal woman with garments of leaves, peacock feathers, and a parasol. She is depicted in the company of eleven attendants and two door-guardians. She is offered her own Gayatri Mantra. The Jain goddess Padmāvatī has also been associated with her.

Tvarita is stated in the Lalitopakhyana, a part of the Lalita Mahatmaya of the Brahmanda Purana, as the one of protector deities of the Sri Chakra, and the slayer of the asura named Pundraketu.

According to the Shiva Purana, Tvarita joined the goddesses of Bhadrakali, Kali, Katyayani, Chamunda, Tvarita, Vaishnavi, Ishani, Mundamardini under Veerabhadra to destroy Daksha's yajna. Her puja rituals are mentioned in the Agni Purana.
