= Shivaduti =

Form of Hindu goddess Adi Parashakti

Shivaduti (Śivadūtī)
- Affiliation: Devi, Parvati
- Mantra: Oṃ Śiṁ Śivadūtyai Namaḥ
- Weapon: Scimitar, Trident
- Mount: Jackal

Shivaduti (Sanskrit: शिवदूति, romanized: Śivadūti) is a manifestation of the Hindu mother goddess Adi Parashakti.She is the eighth among Kauśikī’s Navamātṛkā Kramā (Nine Mother Tradition)

== Iconography ==
In the Kalika Purana, Shivaduti is described as having a red complexion, with long matted hair, three eyes, and holding a scimitar, trident, leather shield, and noose, while her left foot rests on the back of a jackal and her right foot tramples a corpse. She is surrounded by millions of jackals howling alongside her, while her voice itself is compared with a jackal’s in other texts.

== Legend ==
According to the Devi Mahatmyam, during the battle against the asuras Sumbha and Nisumbha, Shivaduti emerged from the body of the goddess Chandi and tasked Shiva to deliver an ultimatum to the asuras: if they did not surrender the three worlds that they had usurped from Indra and the devas, they would be devoured by her jackals. Since the goddess had sent Shiva as her messenger, she was named Shivaduti.
