= Vishvambhari =

Epithet of Mahadevi

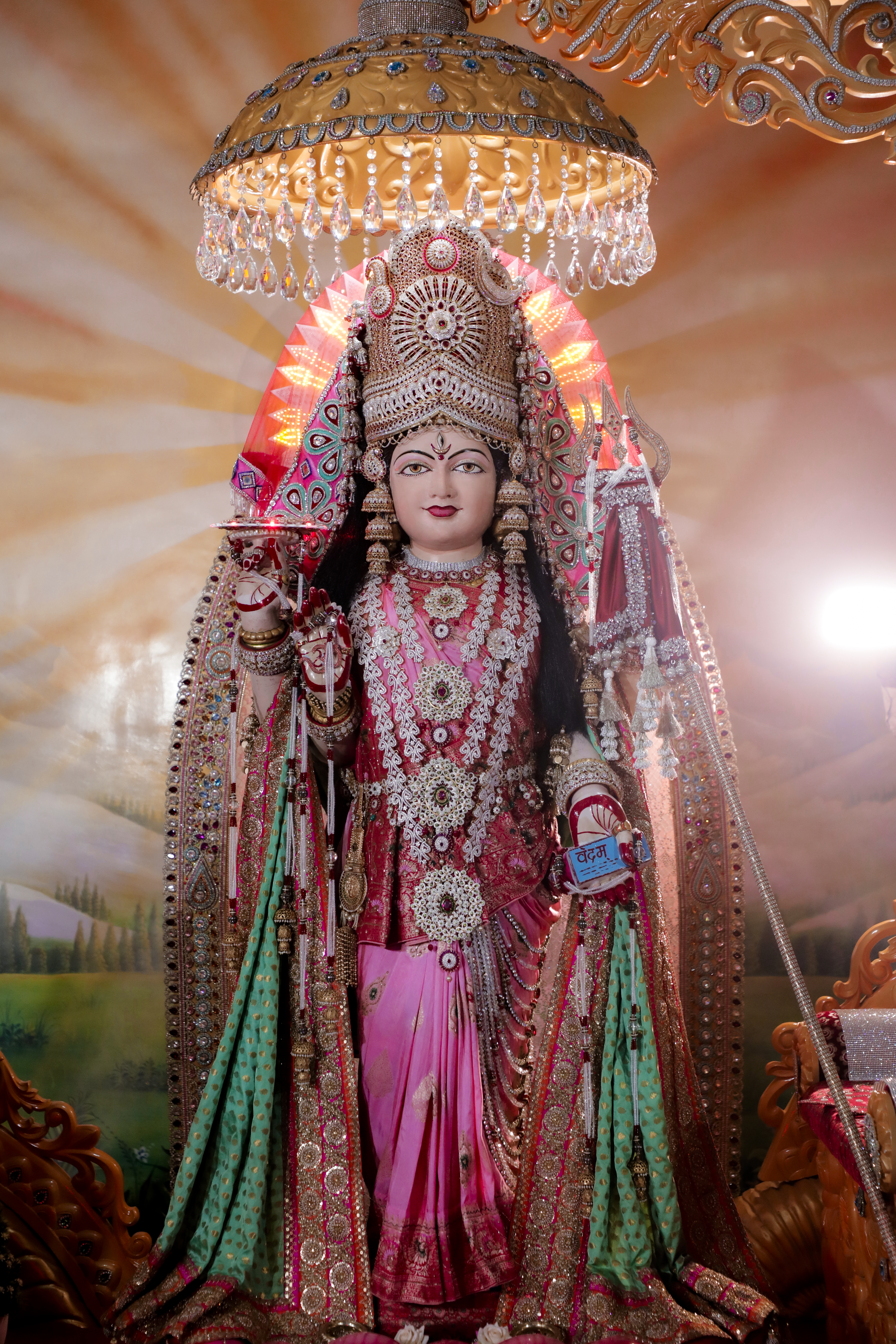
Murti of Vishvambhari

Vishvambhari (Sanskrit: विश्वम्भरी, romanized: Viśvambharī) is an epithet of the supreme goddess Mahadevi in Hinduism. Literally translating to, "all-wearing", it refers to an attribute of the goddess Bhavani, the divine consort of Hara (as Annapurna). Kamakhya Tantra describes the goddess Kamakhya as Vishvambhari, who is the Kriyashakti of Parameshvara. In the Mahabhagavata Purana, when Shailajā assumes the fierce form of Mahakali, Rudra recites her 1008 names to pacify Shailajā—one of which is Vishvambhari. Similarly, in the Adbhuta Ramayana, when Sita assumes the fierce form of Mahakali (instead of the former), Rama recites her 1008 names to pacify Sita—one of which turns out as Vishvambhari. She also has a Gujarati hymn called the Stuti dedicated to her which is sung during the festival of Navratri in her honor.

== See also ==
- Shakambhari
- Bhuvaneshvari
- Ishvari
