= Raktadantika =

Hindu goddess

- Affiliation: Devi, Durga
- Mantra: Om raktadantikayaya namaha
- Weapon: Sword, pestle, plough

Raktadantika (Sanskrit: रक्तदन्तिका, romanized: Raktadantikā) is a form of the Hindu goddess Durga. According to the Devi Mahatmya, Raktadantika incarnated to slay the descendants of the asura Viprachitti. Another account describes her as a form of Kali, with an entirely red body.

== Etymology ==
Raktadantika means “she whose teeth are red in colour”.

== Legend ==
According to the Devi Mahatmya, Durga is described to have incarnated as Raktadantika to slay and devour the danava children of the asura Viprachitti. Her teeth are described to have turned as red as the flowers of a pomegranate, a consequence of which she was named Raktadantika. This legend is also featured in the Markandeya Purana.

She has been described as living in a pomegranate tree. Her red teeth are analogous to red pomegranate seed pods.
