= Angala Devi =

Hindu goddess

Angala Paramesvari Amman
- Cities
- Member of Matrikas
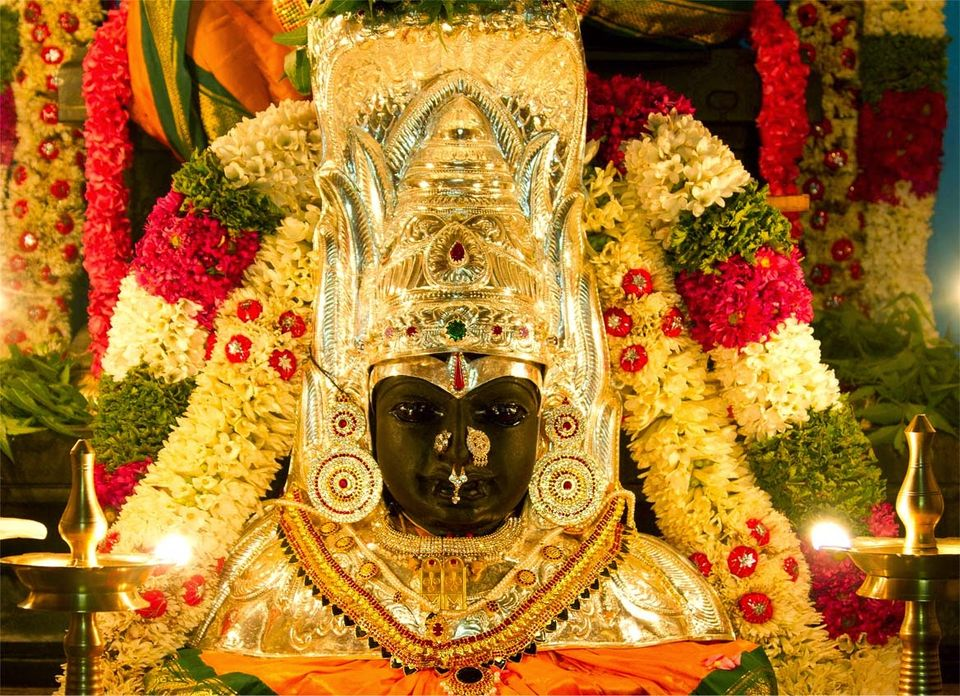
- A statue of Angala Parameshvari Amman at Melmalayanur Angala Parameshvari Amman Temple
- Other names: Angalamman; Angala Devi; Angala Paramesvari; Angala Ishvari; Thandeshwari; Poongavanathuamman; Periyanayagi; Periyayi; Periyandichi; Pechiyayi
- Venerated in: Tamil Diaspora in Tamil Nadu, Fiji, Caribbean Tamil Communities, South Africa, Mauritius, Thailand, Malaysia, Singapore, Vietnam, Trinidad and Tobago, Karnataka
- Associate: Shiva
- Abode: Mel Malayanoor
- Weapon: Trident; Sword
- Animals: Lions, snakes
- Adherents: Shaktas, Shaivas
- Mount: Lion
- Temples: Kottur Angala Parameshwari; Mel Malayanoor Angalamman; Putlur Poongavanathu Amman; Chithalur Angalamman
- Consort: Shiva

Angala Devi, also known as Angalamman, Angala Paramesvari, and Aṅkāḷaparamēcuvari, Periyandichi, Periyayi, Periyanayagi, Ankala, Kati Ankamma, Anakalamma, and Ankamma is an aspect of the Hindu goddess Parvati, or Kali, primarily worshipped in the villages of South India as a kaval deivam, a guardian deity. She is often additionally considered to be an aspect of one of the Matrikas. However, she predates Hinduism's presence in South India and is not an exclusively Hindu goddess. She is particularly venerated by thirunangai (Tamil transfeminine people) and seen as an ethical role model and legitimizer for their existence. She is also sometimes seen as a goddess of graves, cremation, and resurrection.

== Origin ==
While disputed, some believe that Angalamman is the deified form of a human woman who was wronged or murdered. Many deities in South India have such origins, and are sometimes called "pey" (a word also applied to evil and restless spirits). These figures are appeased after their wrongful death, reconciling them towards humans. They frequent cremation grounds, uncultivated areas, and uninhabited places. Angalamman notably is associated with the cremation ground and must be appeased during certain ceremonies, and is an ambivalent figure that can afflict or heal. However, no myth that describes her as being wronged and dying tragically exists today. Given her association with children and as a "fetus slayer", some more specifically posit that she was a murdered pregnant woman. Her ambivalent goddess status (rather than a demonic one) allows those who have lost children to better cope by interacting with her, as she both gives an opportunity for things to be remedied and a way to view the death more positively without diminishing the horror of what happened.

Despite this, some of her devotees (such as many thirunangai) see her as a primarily positive presence in their lives, in contrast to transfeminine devotees of another ambivalent goddess, Yellama, where the ambivalence is more prominent. Instead, her fearsome aspects are seen as protective, and issues devotees have are seen as their faults being tested or the result of outside forces, such as evil spirits and sorcerers. Her anger, frenzy, and outrage are considered moral and righteous states that may be experienced by her devotees as well during trance. However, this anger is not seens as something to leave uncontrolled.

== Legend ==
Angalamman is a manifestation of Parvati that is more popular in South India. She is a fierce form of Parvati who is a guardian deity in many villages. It is stated that Parvati took the form of Angala Amman to help Shiva get rid of the Kapala that was following him after he cut off the fifth head of Brahma.

She is sometimes considered one of the Seven Sisters, a group of goddesses represented by the Pleiades. However, this grouping is applied to many different goddesses, and sometimes may be an independent group. The Seven Sisters are also sometimes conflated with the Saptamatrikas. The Seven Sisters are sometimes said to have a younger brother, Potu Razu.

At one point the Sembadava (a caste of freshwater fishermen) considered Angalamman to be their clan deity. To this day they hold the priesthood rights at one of her prominent temples. They believe that Angalamman was a Sembadava woman who Shiva fell in love with, and at one point performed rituals to her where participants dressed up as Shiva by wearing a feathered cap and smearing ashes on their faces. She has also been recorded as keeping away "the devils of the forest". She is also important to some clans of land owning farmers.

The goddess Pecci or Periyachi is sometimes considered a form of Angalamman. Pecci can either harm or protect children, and is frequently depicted as disembowling pregnant women and removing fetuses from their bellies. One of Pecci's prominent myths is that she prevented Shiva from being reborn into a monstrous lineage with a devilish king for a father by tricking the king (Vallalarajan) into letting her serve as midwife, then disembowling the queen. Another is that she was a midwife who discovered that a couple was planning to sacrifice their child once born, and killed both of them, disembowling the woman and raising their son as her own. At other times Pecci is simply Angalamman's attendant.

A variant of the Vallalarajan myth exists in the Manai Telugu Chettiar community, who consider themselves to be the "children of Amman". In it, an asura (no name given) manages to win a boon from Shiva (this is an element of some versions of the Vallalarajan myth). Using his boon he causes suffering and trouble for many others, but because the boon cannot be revoked, Parvati is given a new boon to help her kill this asura. She descends in the form of Angalamman, and the asura is so terrified he hides inside a corpse. To find him Angalamman proceeded to eat every corpse in the graveyard. She also tied some of the body parts around her waist and danced during this occasion.

=== Brahma's head ===
The core myth of Angalamman follows a basic structure: Brahma in some way angers Shiva (usually in a way involving Parvati and/or Angalamman), Shiva takes one of Brahma's heads, the head harms Shiva, and Angalamman saves Shiva but temporarily enters a frenzied, angry state to do so (either from a curse, attack, or willful transformation into a fearsome form like Kali). Among thirunangai this narrative may have an added detail or event that emphasizes why Angalamman has a connection to them.

According to legend, Shiva took the form of Bhairava and cut off the fifth head of Brahma for being arrogant about his creation. Brahma had no remorse about the suffering that living beings experienced on earth. Shiva soon felt remorseful. To receive redemption for the sin, Brahma told him to become a wandering ascetic (Bhikshatana) and beg for food in his skull, and he felt remorse for and cured the suffering of living beings on earth.

As per the story of Angalamman, the fifth head of Brahma started following Shiva. The head of Brahma made his home in the arm of Shiva and started eating whatever Shiva received from begging.

Parvati decided to put an end to the Kapala of Brahma. On the advice of Vishnu, she prepared food for Shiva at Thandakarunyam Tirtham near Angikulam Tirtham. Shiva came to eat the food. Parvati intentionally scattered food around the place and the Kapala of Brahma came down to eat them, leaving the hand of Shiva. Parvati seized this opportunity and took the fierce form of Angalamman and stamped down the Kapala using her right leg and destroyed it, turning it into ashes, after which it merged with Brahma.

Another version of this story is that originally, Brahma and Shiva both had five heads. Brahma one day disguised himself and attempted to have sex with Shiva's wife, Parvati, but was caught when she saw his true reflection in the water. She told her husband of this, and in his rage he struck Brahma, and took one of his heads off. The head stuck to Shiva and began sucking away his life force and driving him mad. He wandered the world's cremation grounds, afflicted and eating marrow from human bones, half burnt corpses, and drinking blood. Vishnu informed Angalamman that soon Shiva would arrive at a cremation ground near her, and that she had to cook massive amounts of food and scatter them in the area. The food enticed the head to release Shiva so it could eat the food, and Angalamman stomped on it. Unfortunately, this meant the head was now attached to Angalamman, and began driving her crazy and making her eat corpses. To help her, a large yearly festival occurs (Mayana Kollai) where large amounts of food are taken to the cremation ground, which satiate her hunger and return Angalamman to her normal self. A slight variation on this story is that the head did not bite Angalamman, but Saraswati cursed her for stepping on Brahma's head, causing her to go mad and have an insatiable hunger.

A variant of the previous story is that Angalamman (who in this version is Shiva's wife) mistakenly bowed to Brahma, as he and Shiva both having five heads confused her, and Brahma mocked her by joking that she was unfaithful. This angered both her and Shiva, causing her to curse Brahma and say he'd loose a head, and Shiva to immediately fulfill that curse. The rest of the story proceeds as the previous except that Angalamman took the form of Kali before stomping on the head and it did not manage to bite her. In this story she fuses with Shiva's left side and becomes Ardhanari at the end, emphasizing her connection to transgender women.

During her madness, Angalamman is described as dressing herself in rags, having loose disheveled hair, holding Brahma's severed head in her hand, and eating corpses.

A legend circulated only among the thirunangai says that after she stepped on Brahma's severed head and was driven mad by a curse and her hunger, she wandered into a hut that a thirunangai was living in during the month of Maasi. The thirunangai took her in, but was ill. Angalamman healed her with herbs (since outside of the month of Maasi she was able to behave normally). When Maasi came again, Angalamman once again took on a fearsome and mad form. She needed entrails to wear as a garland, and the thirunangai ended up sacrificing herself and giving Angalamman her entrails to wear. The thirunangai told Angalamman that she should appear in the form of a thirunangai from now on, and that it would bring prosperity to the land. And so, from then on Angalamman appeared as a thirunangai, gave special attention to thirunangais, and this is why thirunangais like her so much. This myth has some similarities to one where Yellama is chased by a land owner after picking some vegetables to eat, and is hidden by the goddess Matangi in the Dalit quarter. The land owner cuts off Matangi's nose for not telling him where Yellama went, but is healed and given the status of sister by Yellama when she sees what happened.

This central narrative emphasizes grand gestures of generosity. The amount of food used to save both Shiva and Angalamman is immense. The help Angalamman also requires a generosity of a spiritual nature, as in doing so Angalamman loses her sanity and personally suffers in Shiva's stead. It also emphasizes that actions initially involving two people spiral outward (especially in myths that distinguish Parvati and Angalamman as different people and include Vishnu and other gods as central figures). It emphasizes the morals of being willing to give (not just of worldly goods, but of one's self), being willing to be vulnerable to other's troubles, and being willing to intervene for others.

Because of the versions of this myth where Parvati and Angalamman are the same being, some women who have had to separate from their husbands (as Angalamman had to be separate from Shiva while he was wandering before she could save him) worship Angalamman.

The most famous temple dedicated to Angalamman is the Sri Angala Parameswari Temple at Melmalayanur in Gingee Taluk in Villupuram District in Tamil Nadu. This site is heavily associated with a major annual festival for Angalamman.

== Iconography ==
She is sometimes depicted with four arms. They hold a trident, a skull, a knife, and an utukkai drum. They might also hold two weapons, a utukkai drum, and a pot of food. On her head may be a crown with flames coming from it, behind which is a cobra with a spread hood. One leg may be folded with the other hanging down when she is seated. The foot hanging down may sometimes be stepping on Brahma's severed head, and her body language may come off as distinctly masculine. At other times she only has two arms, and yet other times she may have fangs, huge eyes, and a lolling tongue, holding many weapons and riding a lion. She is also sometimes depicted wearing a skirt made of rags. She also may wear a garland of skulls or lemons.

Images made of loose earth are made on the ground during her yearly festival, and people take handfuls of this dirt as part of the ceremony. Sometimes instead of representing her this image represents the wife of the evil king Vallalarajan.

== Worship ==
Angalamman is worshipped especially on the days of the new moon, full moon, and annual festivals. A common ritual in her name is cleansing involving lemons, limes, or pumpkins. Thirunangai are often present at her temples at these times and may perform these rituals for other devotees.

Those who are possessed by her or other gods/goddesses may experience the goddess "descending" at inconvenient times that may put the person in danger. When this happens, friends may extract a promise from the divinity during the trance that they will not come randomly, instead being summoned only by lit camphor. This does not make the divinity stop forever, but helps the human being possessed regain some control.

At her yearly festival, a procession occurs where thirunangai volunteer to be possessed by her and carry a firepot for her. Those possessed sometimes have their tongues pierced with a small trident as an austerity during the procession.

Some people at her yearly festival hold the intestines of goats or chickens in their mouths, some bite the heads off chickens, and some wear "intestine" garlands of red ribbon. Sometimes those possessed by her will drink the blood of sacrificed animals.

Statues of her are common today, but in the early 20th century, she was often represented by an unhewn stone or a pot containing shells and earthen mugs, along with a few other items. Her sacrifices and rituals during this time were noted as especially bloody and including live impalations of animals. Pacification rituals for her at the time involved a storyteller (a "man disguised as a woman") making an earthen image of her at the burial ground, dressing it, a large amount of food being prepared, and a sacrifice being made. The sacrificial animal blood was poured into the earthen image's mouth. The people she'd afflicted then prostrated before her.

When her story is recited, sometimes a muggu design is made on the floor of the room. It must include the colors white, red, yellow, green, and black. This recitation is called Ankamma kolupu.

== Connection to transgender women ==
Angalamman is often connected to thirunangai (literally "honorable women", a term used by transgender Tamils that is synonymous with the term aravani). Like the hijra community (both the Muslim/syncretic majority and Hindu minority), some thirunangai also venerate Bahuchara Mata, but she is considered a distant figure only associated with the nirvan (gender affirming surgery). In day-to-day life, amman (mother) goddesses like Angalamman are more important. Angalamman is not the only amman goddess important to transgender people, and some may feel a strong connection to other religious figures such as Aravan or Ardhanari. Many of the transgender devotees to Angalamman are maruladis (trance dancers) or saamiyaadis (deity dancers). Both terms refer to the practice of dancing while embodying or being possessed by a god(dess). They also may perform healing rituals, benedictions, counter-sorcery, exorcisms, and so on while channeling Angalamman. Beyond channeling and possession, some of them are ritual experts on venerating Angalamman, and perform devotional labor (cooking, cleaning ritual spaces and paraphernalia, and making garlands for rituals). Cisgender people often consider the thirunangai to be Angalamman in human form, regardless of if they are currently in trance.

While many thirunangai meet people who see them as venerable carriers of blessing and power every day, there are often just as many, if not more, cisgender people who are apprehensive of them and are even hostile. Thirunangai often view being approached for blessing positively, as such people are being respectful and have benevolent intentions.

The nature of a thirunangai's connection to Angalamman varies. Some are possessed by her at a young age, usually during a ceremony. Some are from clans or castes that venerate her before they realize they are a thirunangai. Sometimes there is a combination of these factors. Some believe that if Angalamman possesses ("descends upon") a young boy, or even a married man, he will gradually become a thirunangai and begin to wear jewelry and women's clothes, eventually becoming a woman. Some say that anyone Angalamman possesses will find themselves changed in some way, and that this is just what happens to "men" specifically. It is also simultaneously believed that she is already drawn towards people who will become thirunangai. A suddenness and choice from the goddess (not the human) is emphasized in accounts of possession. Cisgender devotees sometimes also become oracles, exorcists, or soothsayers by the power of Angalamman, but their first encounter with her is usually in a dream or vision, and never in trance. Sometimes this initial possession is mistaken as being caused by a demon (pey) by unfamiliar family members before it is diagnosed as a goddess possession.

Angalamman herself is sometimes seen as transgender, though not necessarily as a transgender woman. One thirunangai described her as a "thirunambi, she is a woman who has a man within her" (i.e. a transmasculine way of viewing Angalamman). Others do not specifically see Angalamman as transmasculine, but do view Angalamman as androgynous or in some way explicitly connected to Ardhanari. Others still see Angalamman as explicitly a transgender woman.

For thirunangai with an intimate connection to Angalamman that grants them power, they connect their ability to use that power to their closeness to the goddess, and in turn connect that to their integrity. A person who has not acted with integrity and has power from Angalamman will see their power wane and decrease in efficacy, often meaning people who come to them for healing are not helped as much as they could be. People who begin to doubt Angalamman is carrying out justice may have similar problems.

Many transgender women in India also make money via sex work, which Angalamman does not judge them for. So long as they earn their money without lying, stealing, or scamming people, she considers it honest money. Some of them explicitly do it to ensure they can host lavish festivals for the goddess by securing funding, though donation campaigns are also used. Unlike in some hijra communities, thirunangai who are devotees of Angalamman do not see themselves as ascetics, think Angalamman wants them to be ascetics, or value ascetic asexuality over sexuality (including the sexuality of being a sex worker) in a ritual context.

Angalamman is also widely venerated in other (primarily cisgender) non-Brahmin, artisanal, and working-class communities (including by cisgender sex workers), and connects thirunangai to them in a broader social network. For some thirunangai, Angalamman also helps them maintain both connections to their ritual family made by rit, and their natal family. The latter is somewhat unusual for transfeminine people in South Asia, as the breaking of ties to family due to prejudice and as a form of religious renunciation is common. Some scholars have also noticed parallels between thirunangai who worship Angalamman and the "slum religion" of Dalits (Christian and Hindu), namely in that gods are seen as highly moral figures who expect moral standards of their devotees alongside faith and commitment. Devotees are also expected to be vulnerable before their god, seeing them as someone to rely upon. Both groups are also pragmatic and see worship as a way to wish for and attain worldly goods and good relationships, rather than seeing worldly concerns as less important or valid than otherworldly/transcendent ones. "This world" and how one lives in it is a matter of high importance. If a thirunangai feels Angalamman is not helping them- such as if they are experiencing injustice, ill health, and so on without relief- they will pragmatically start to look towards other gods and religions, such as Christianity, who may offer them aid. However, such exploration may not be serious and may serve as a way of reminding the goddess to care for them.

Many transgender Tamils are primarily secular in their activism, though this may exist alongside communal veneration of goddesses. Unlike the Muslim hijras, or Hindu trans communities like shiva-shaktis and joginis, thirunangai do not make religious identity a core feature of being a thirunangai, though individuals may find it important. Some thirunangai dedicated to Angalamman are Muslim, or practice a syncretism with her worship and Islam. Thirungai also do not use their position within religion as a basis for their political goals, even if they leverage it socially. Some are careful to delineate and keep quiet their religious activities specifically because they do not want to present as "Hindu" in their transgender activism in the current Hinduvta influenced political environment. In general there is a silent agreement among the community that thirunangai is a secular term for transgender women and transfeminine people, with no religious connotations (such as those associated with the previous common Tamil term for the community, Aravani- a term explicitly connecting the community to Aravan). Not all thirunangai are devoted to Angalamman, though many still socialize at events related to her.

The association between the goddess and transgender women has likely always existed on some level, but specifically has intensified over recent decades as trans activism has become more public. The surviving historical record makes no mention of transgender people at Angalamman ceremonies before the latter half of the 20th century, but we do know ritual crossdressing was done, and doing so made one embody the goddess. This is mentioned as far back as the early 20th century. Some older thirunangai who lived during the early to mid 20th century have also noted that the gender presentation among transfeminine people was different back then, and it would have been easier for authors to mistake a "pottai" for a man, since they would have cut their hair short and worn some men's clothes, but with a few articles of women's clothing or with the clothes arranged in a feminine way. Additionally, hormone therapy did not exist or was not easily available back then, and fewer people went through nirvan (a form of castration used by transfeminine communities in India).

Several terms like rit/reet, guru, guru-bhai, and chela are used both by thirunangai and hijras. Alongside not using aravani due to its explicitly religious meaning, Tamil transgender women and transfeminine people do not usually use hijra because it is often used in a nationalizing way, though it may occasionally deployed rhetorically during interactions with cisgender people to emphasize the shared "holy" aspects of identity. Thirunangai allows them to express a specifically Dravidian/Tamil identity as transgender women. While thirunangai is used for the purposes of legal discourse, in day-to-day life many thirunangai actually call themselves pottai or kothi- words referring to a broader group of effeminate people, including gay men. These two words are often user disparagingly by the general public, similar to sissy or fag. Kothi is also sometimes used by thirunangai to refer to a thirunangai that has not begun to transition yet, or who sometimes presents themselves with a male name and other masculine signifiers. A thirunangai being called a pottai by someone who is not a pottai is immediately understood as an insult. However, these terms also allow the people referred to by them to form and access a broader community that understands the struggles of being targeted by effemiphobia and anti-queer rhetoric. Pottai is also used to encapsulate the feeling some thirunangai have that they are simultaneously "neither" and "both" male and female, often expressed as having a male body but a female heart. The feminine aspect is the more personal one, and the one that causes them to be identified as pottais by others. Some believe that Angalamman prefers people who fit this "neither" and "both" description to be her devotees and servants.

== See also ==
- Isakki
- Matrikas
- Shitala
- Sudalai Madan
