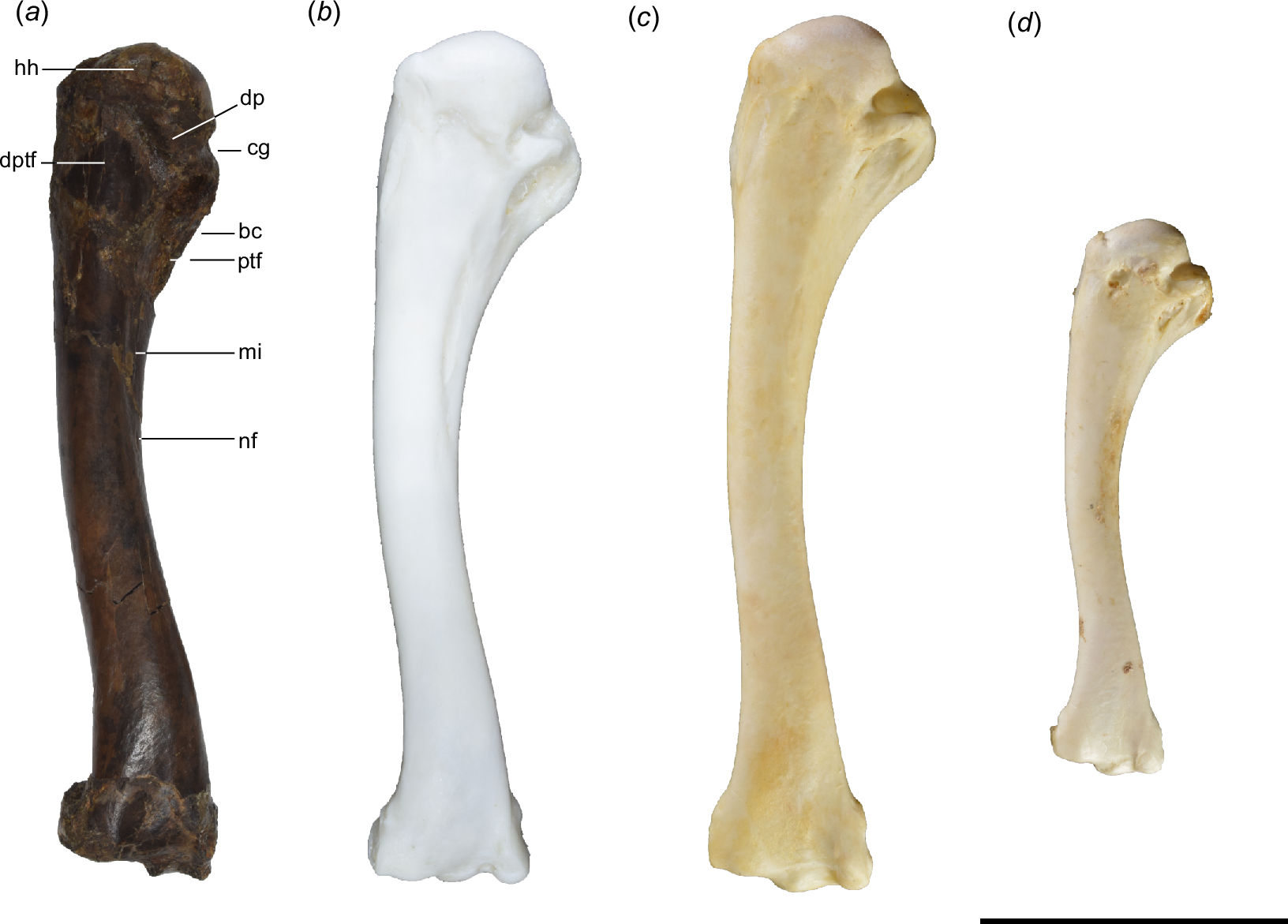
- Holotype humerus of P. miejue (a) compared to the humeri of three extant peafowl species

Scientific classification
- Kingdom: Animalia
- Phylum: Chordata
- Class: Aves
- Order: Galliformes
- Family: Phasianidae
- Genus: Pavo
- Species: †P. miejue

Binomial name
- †Pavo miejue Lan et al., 2026

= Pavo miejue =

Pavo miejue Temporal range: mid-Pleistocene, ~0.8–0.4 Ma

Extinct bird species

Pavo miejue is an extinct species of peafowl in the family Phasianidae. It is known from a single humerus found in the Middle Pleistocene Chiting Formation of Taiwan, dating to 0.8 to 0.4 million years ago. P. miejue is the first extinct bird recorded from Taiwan, as well as the first instance of an extinct Asian peafowl. This is reflected in its proposed common name, 滅絕孔雀 (lit. 'extinct peafowl'). It is the second fossil Pavo species named, following the European Pavo bravardi.

== Discovery and naming ==
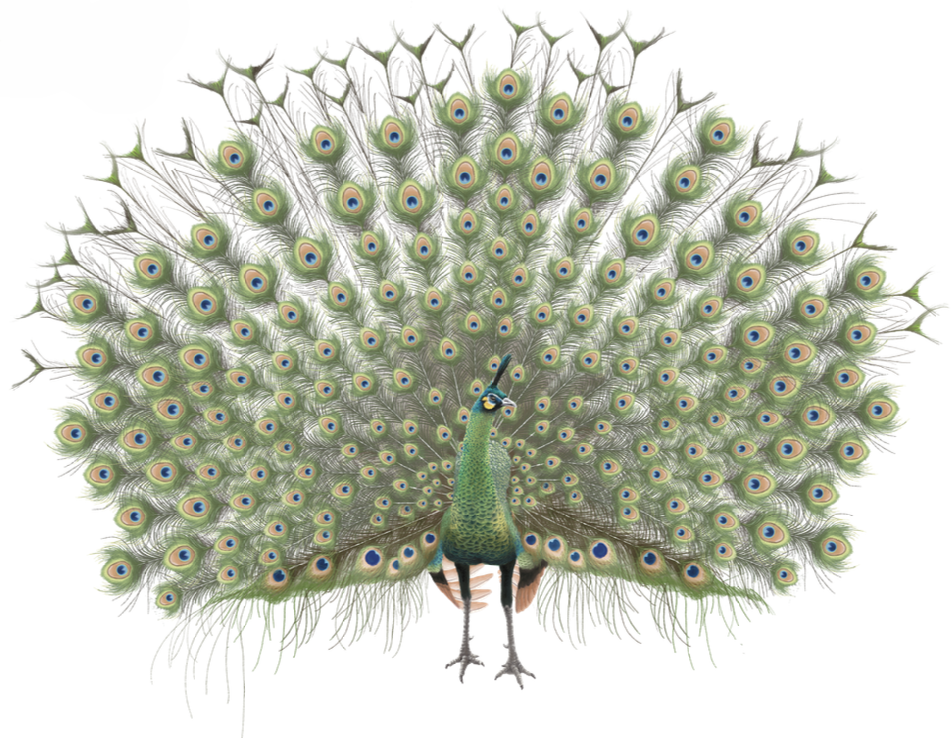
Speculative life restoration of P. miejue

The Pavo miejue fossil material was discovered by L.-R. Hou, a private fossil collector, in outcrops of the Chiting Formation in Tainan City, Taiwan. Hou donated the specimen, a nearly complete left humerus (upper arm bone), to Cheng-Hsiu Tsai to be researched. The bone is housed in the Vertebrate Palaeontology collections of the Museum of Zoology at National Taiwan University (NTU) in Taipei, where it is permanently accessioned as specimen NTUM-VP 241105.

In 2026, Yong-Jie Lan, Gerald Mayr, and Cheng-Hsiu Tsai described Pavo miejue as a new species of the peafowl genus Pavo based on these fossil remains, establishing NTUM-VP 241105 as the holotype specimen. The specific name, miejue, reflects the English pronunciation of 滅絕 (myeh-jweh), referring to an extinction event in Taiwanese or Traditional Chinese. This name was chosen to allude to the significance of this species and its status as the first extinct bird found in the country.

== See also ==
- List of endemic birds of Taiwan
