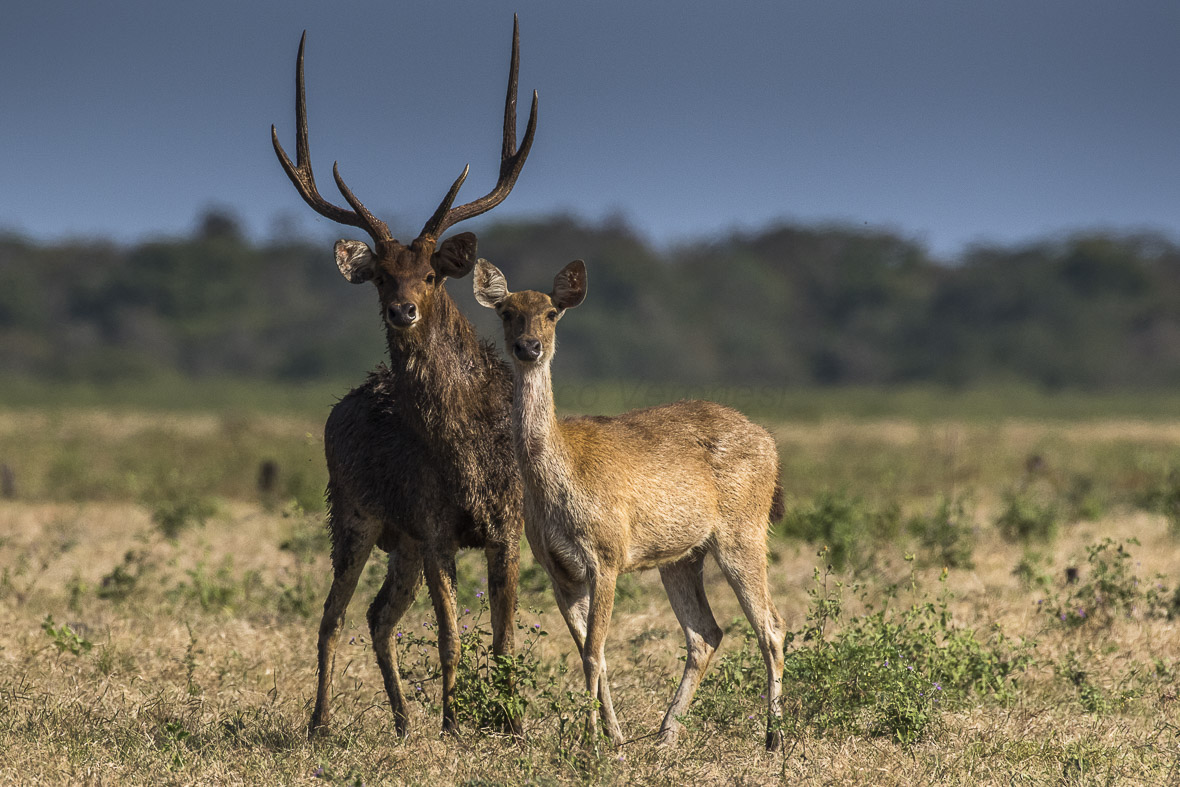
- Male and female at Baluran National Park, East Java, Indonesia

Conservation status
- Vulnerable (IUCN 3.1)

Scientific classification
- Kingdom: Animalia
- Phylum: Chordata
- Class: Mammalia
- Order: Artiodactyla
- Family: Cervidae
- Genus: Rusa
- Species: R. timorensis

Binomial name
- Rusa timorensis (Blainville, 1822)
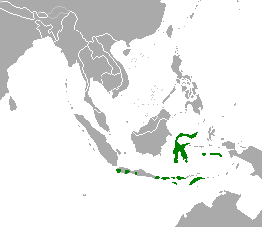
- Present distribution within the native range, including possible ancient introductions

Synonyms
- List: Cervus celebensis Rorig, 1896; Cervus hippelaphus G.Q. Cuvier, 1825 [preoccupied]; Cervus lepidus Sundevall, 1846; Cervus moluccensis Quoy & Gaimard, 1830; Cervus peronii Cuvier, 1825; Cervus russa Muller & Schlegel, 1845; Cervus tavistocki Lydekker, 1900; Cervus timorensis Blainville, 1822; Cervus timorensis ssp. rusa Muller & Schlegel, 1845; Cervus tunjuc Horsfield, 1830 [nomen nudum]

= Javan rusa =

Species of deer

The Javan rusa or Sunda sambar (Rusa timorensis) is a large deer species native to Indonesia and Timor-Leste. Introduced populations exist in a wide variety of locations in the Southern Hemisphere. Rusa is the Malay word for "deer" in general as well as lending the name to its own genus.

== Taxonomy ==
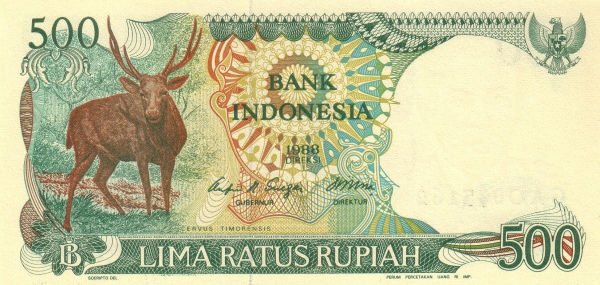
The Javan rusa is featured on a 1988 Indonesian rupiah banknote

Seven subspecies of the Javan rusa are recognised:

- R. t. timorensis (Timor rusa deer) – Timor.
- R. t. djonga – Muna and Butung Islands.
- R. t. floresiensis (Flores rusa deer) – Flores and other islands.
- R. t. macassaricus (Celebes rusa deer) – Sulawesi.
- R. t. moluccensis (Moluccan rusa deer) – Maluku Islands.
- R. t. renschi – Bali.
- R. t. russa (Javan rusa deer) – Java.

== Characteristics ==
The Javan rusa is dark blackish brown and has a gray forehead. Its back is almost black, the underparts and inner thighs are yellowish brown. The abdomen is lighter brown, and the tail tuft is dark blackish brown. The hair is coarse and longer on the chest than on the remaining body. Its ears are wide and a little shorter than the head. The antlers are medium long and rather wide, the upper branch points forward. Fawns are born without spots. Males are bigger than females; head-to-body length varies from 142 to 185 cm (4 ft 8 in to 6 ft 1 in), with a 20 cm (7.9 in) tail. Males weigh 152–160 kg (335–353 lb), female about 74 kg (163 lb).

== Distribution and habitat ==
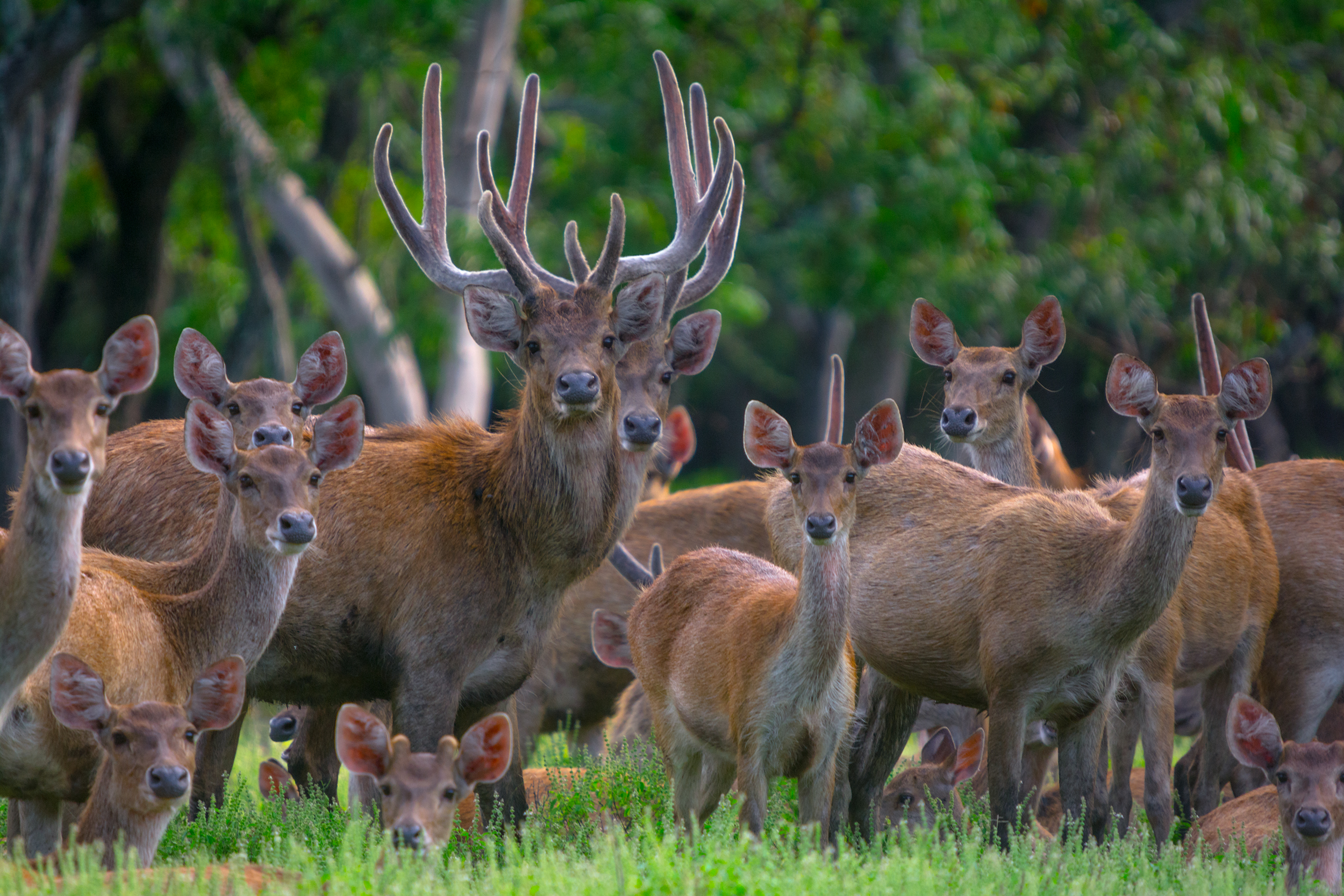
Herd of rusa deer in Baluran National Park

The Javan rusa natively occurs on the islands of Java, Bali and Timor in Indonesia. It has been introduced to Irian Jaya, Borneo, the Lesser Sunda Islands, Maluku, Sulawesi, Pohnpei, Mauritius, Réunion, Fiji, Tonga, Samoa, Vanuatu, the Solomon Islands, the Christmas Island, the Cocos Islands, Nauru, Groote Eylandt, Mainland Australia, New Caledonia, New Zealand, Papua New Guinea, New Britain, and New Ireland. The Javan rusa was introduced by the Dutch to New Guinea in the early 1900s.

Since its introduction to the West Papuan lowlands, the species has become widely dispersed and is common in much of its new range. However its population in its native range has declined markedly by approximately 10,000 individuals in the past two decades and likely faces further decline. As a result it has been listed as vulnerable in its native range and was declared as a protected species under Indonesian law in 2018.

During the 1980s and 1990s, protected areas such as national parks were used to control poaching and the effects of land conversion that destroyed grazing areas. However large numbers of Javan rusa died in Baluran National Park in Indonesia due to the loss of grazing area as a result of the invasive thorny acacia.

== Ecology ==
Javan rusa are nocturnal, although they do graze during the day. They are rarely seen in the open and are very difficult to approach due to their keen senses and cautious instincts.

The rusa deer is often found in small groups or pairs, although males are often seen alone. When alarmed, a rusa stag lets out an extremely loud honk. This is an alarm call and alerts any other deer in the vicinity.

As with other deer species, Javan rusa mainly feed on grass, leaves, and fallen fruit. Most of their fluid requirements are met by the food they consume, so they hardly drink water.

=== Predators ===
The main predators of the Javan rusa include dholes, crocodiles, pythons, and Komodo dragons.

=== Reproduction ===
The Javan rusa mates around July and August, when stags contest by calling in a loud, shrill bark and dueling with the antlers. The doe gives birth to one or two calves after a gestation period of 8 months, at the start of spring. Calves are weaned at 6–8 months, and sexual maturity is attained at 3–5 years, depending on habitat conditions. Javan rusas live 15–20 years both in the wild and in captivity.
