= Baluran =

Stratovolcano in East Java

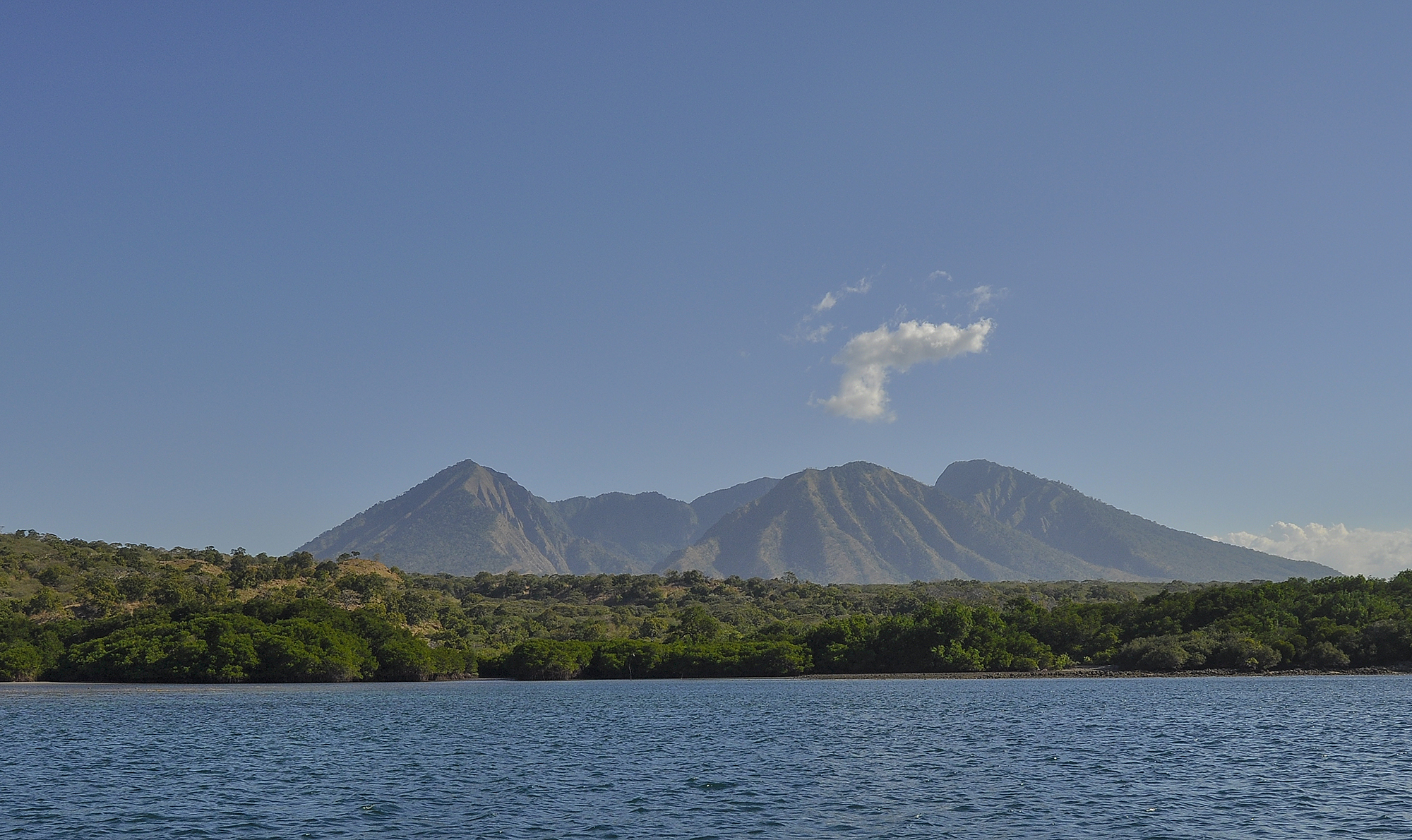
- Mount Baluran

Highest point
- Elevation: 1,247 m (4,091 ft)
- Listing: Ribu
- Coordinates: 7°51′S 114°22′E

Geography
- Location: Baluran National Park, Situbondo Regency, East Java, Indonesia

Geology
- Mountain type: Stratovolcano
- Volcanic arc: Sunda Arc

Baluran is a stratovolcano located on the island of Java. It is at the very northeast of the island and is overshadowed by its much larger neighbour Ijen. The mountain has not erupted in historical times, although it is considered to be of Holocene age.

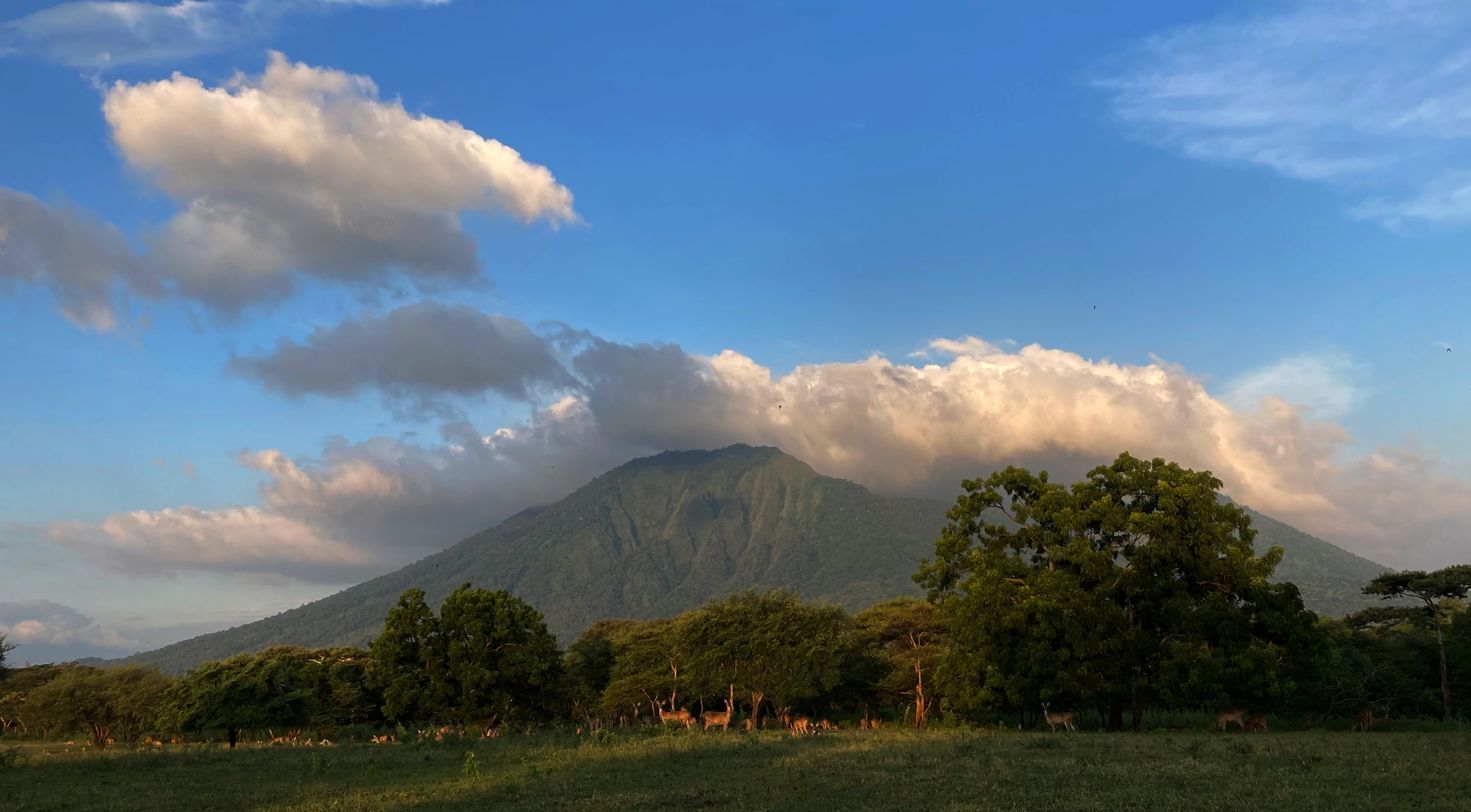
Baluran National Park

== See also ==
- Baluran National Park
- List of volcanoes in Indonesia
