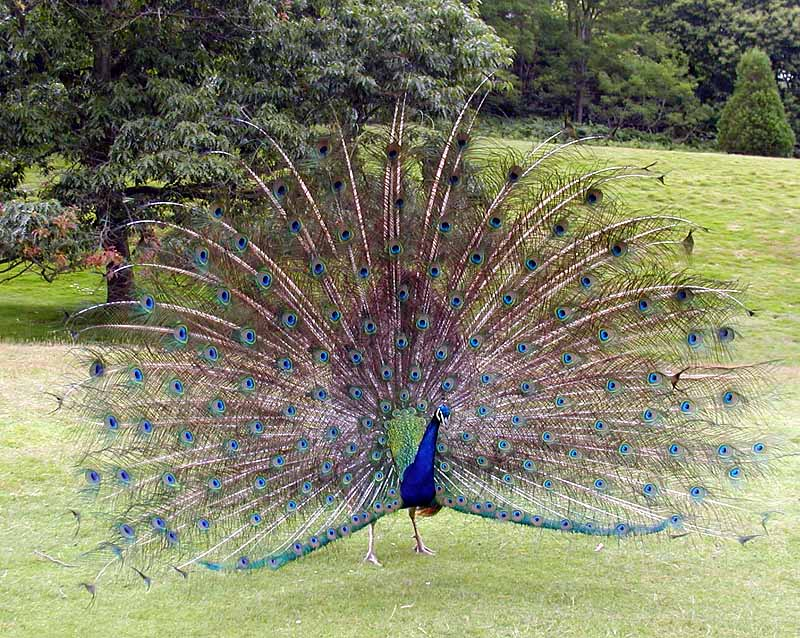
- Indian peacock (Pavo cristatus) displaying his tail

Scientific classification
- Kingdom: Animalia
- Phylum: Chordata
- Class: Aves
- Order: Galliformes
- Family: Phasianidae
- Tribe: Pavonini
- Genus: Pavo; Linnaeus, 1758

Type species
- Pavo cristatus (Indian peafowl) Linnaeus, 1758

Species
- Pavo cristatus Linnaeus, 1758; Pavo muticus Linnaeus, 1766; †Pavo bravardi Gervais, 1849; †Pavo miejue Lan et al., 2026

= Pavo (bird) =

Pavo Temporal range: Late Miocene to present

Genus of birds

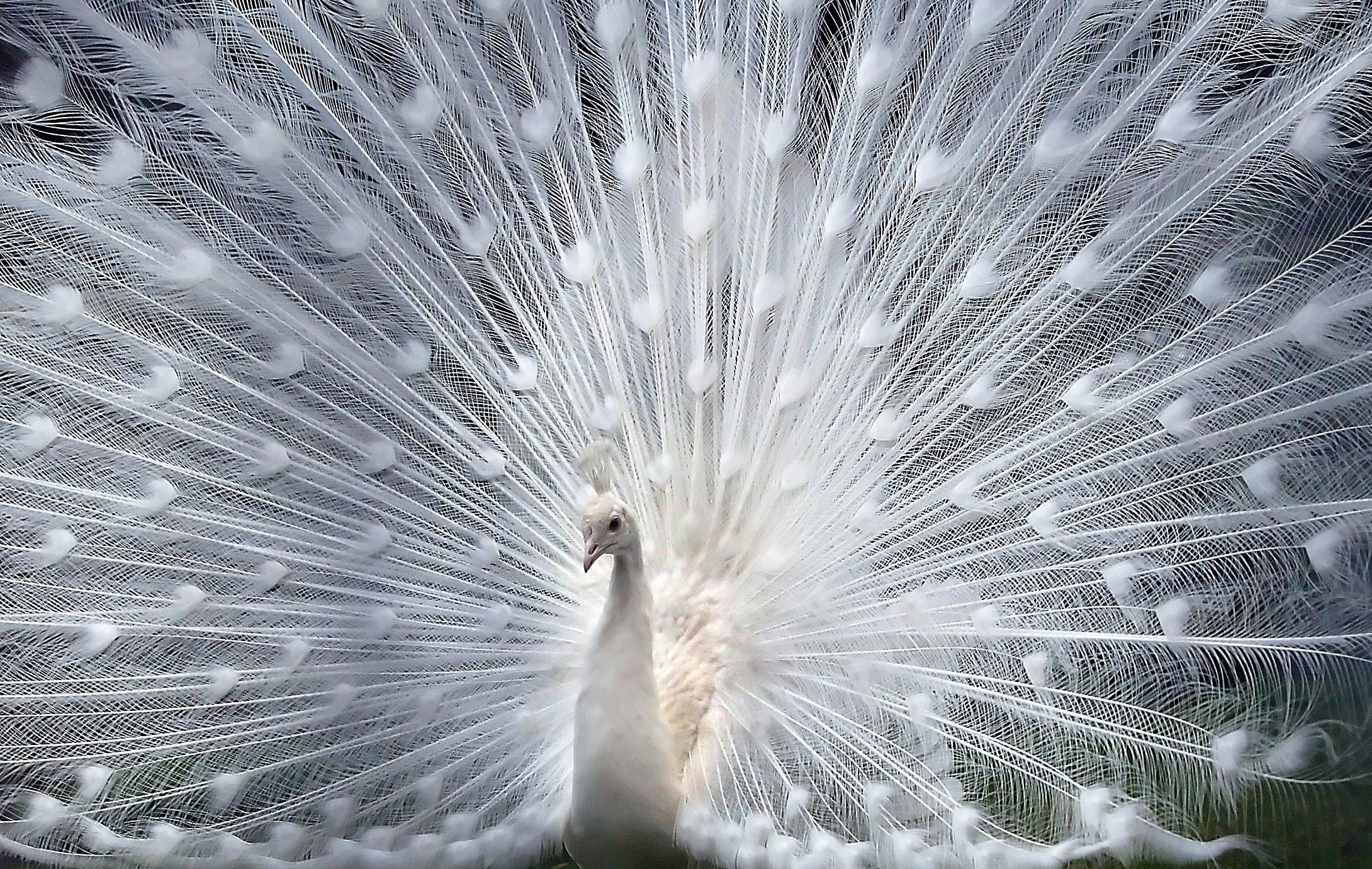
A leucistic Indian peacock in display

Pavo is a genus of two Asiatic species in the tribe Pavonini. The two species, along with the Congo peafowl of Africa, are commonly referred to as "peafowl".

== Taxonomy ==
The genus Pavo was introduced in 1758 by the Swedish naturalist Carl Linnaeus in the tenth edition of his Systema Naturae. The genus name is the Latin word for a peacock. The type species is the Indian peafowl (Pavo cristatus).

== Species ==
The genus Pavo contains two extant species, both native to Asia:

Genus Pavo – Linnaeus, 1758 – two species
Common name	Scientific name and subspecies	Range	Size and ecology	IUCN status and estimated population
Indian peafowl Male Female	Pavo cristatus Linnaeus, 1758	South Asia; introduced elsewhere	Size: Habitat: Diet:	LC
Green peafowl Male Female	Pavo muticus Linnaeus, 1766 Three subspecies: P. m. muticus Linnaeus, 1766; P. m. spicifer Shaw, 1804; P. m. imperator Delacour, 1949	Southeast Asia	Size: Habitat: Diet:	EN

== Fossil record ==
- †Pavo bravardi (Gervais, 1849) (Bravard's peafowl) (Early–Late Pliocene) – Gallus moldovicus, sometimes misspelt moldavicus, may be a junior synonym
- †Pavo miejue Lan et al., 2026 (extinct peafowl) (Middle Pleistocene) – the first extinct bird from Taiwan
- †Gallus aesculapii Jánossy, 1976 (Late Miocene–Early Pliocene) – "junglefowl" of Greece, may also have been a peafowl
