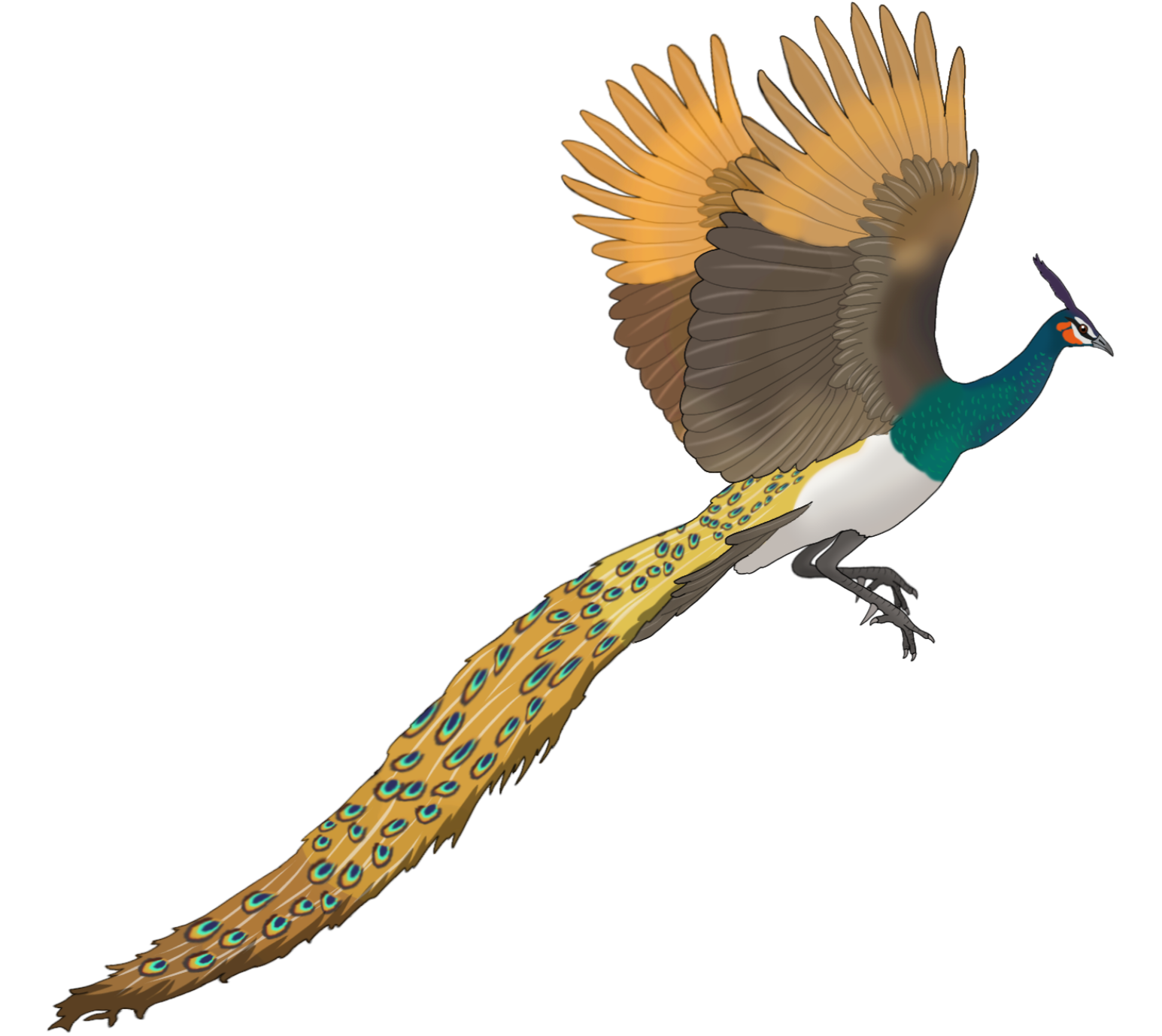
- Speculative life restoration

Scientific classification
- Kingdom: Animalia
- Phylum: Chordata
- Class: Aves
- Order: Galliformes
- Family: Phasianidae
- Genus: Pavo
- Species: †P. bravardi

Binomial name
- †Pavo bravardi Gervais, 1849

= Pavo bravardi =

Pavo bravardi Temporal range: Pliocene to early Pleistocene

Extinct species of bird

Pavo bravardi is an extinct species of peafowl belonging into the genus Pavo that once lived in Europe. Fossils of this species have been recovered from Pliocene to early Pleistocene deposits of France, Moldova, Bulgaria and Greece. It was originally described as a species of Gallus, but was transferred to Pavo by Cécile Mourer-Chauviré in 1989. It was larger than both the Indian peafowl and green peafowl in size.

In the Pliocene on the Balkan Peninsula, Bravard's peafowl coexisted with ptarmigans (Lagopus sp.) Peafowl were widespread on the Balkan Peninsula and in Southeastern Europe until the end of the Pliocene.
