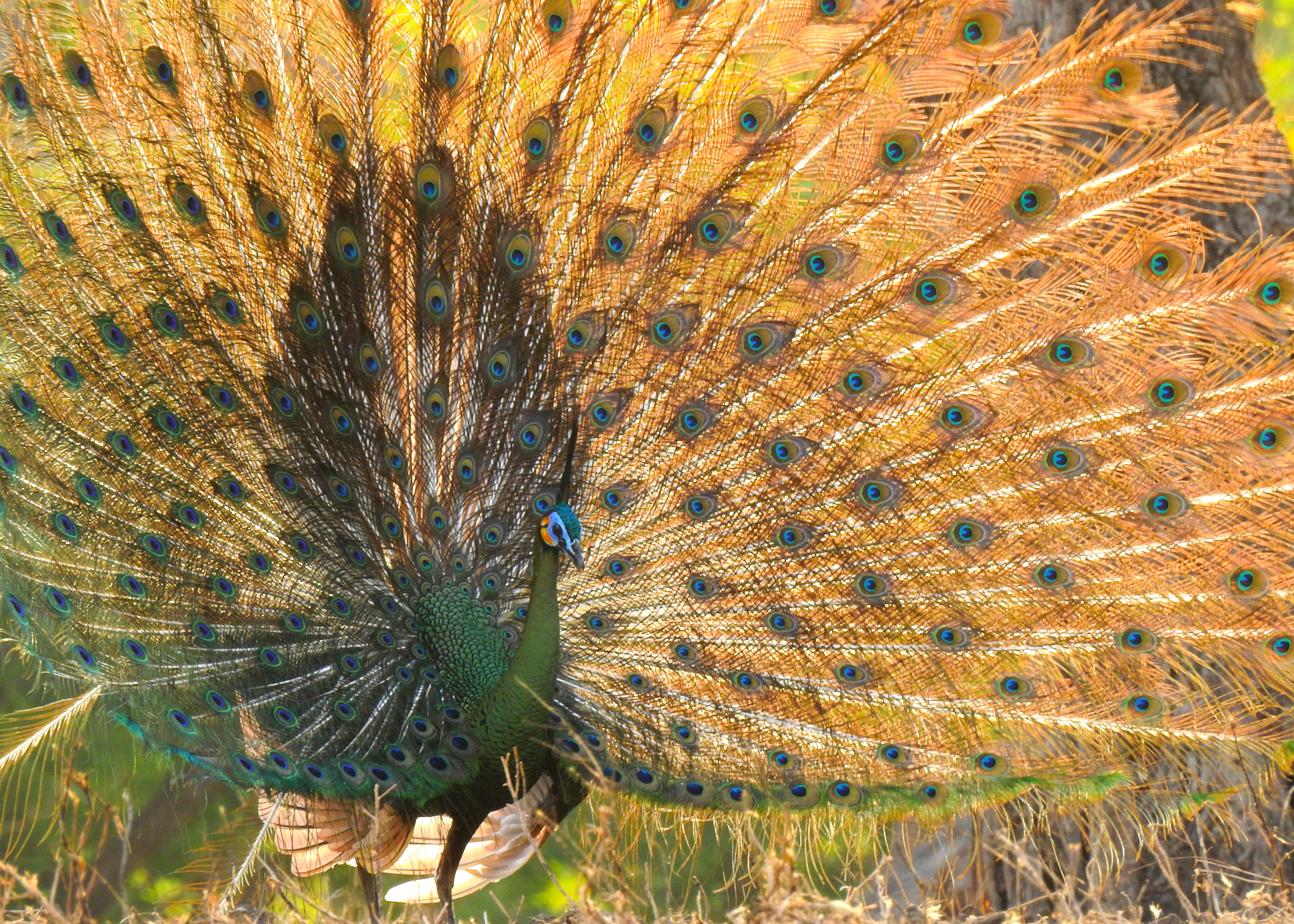
- Male in display
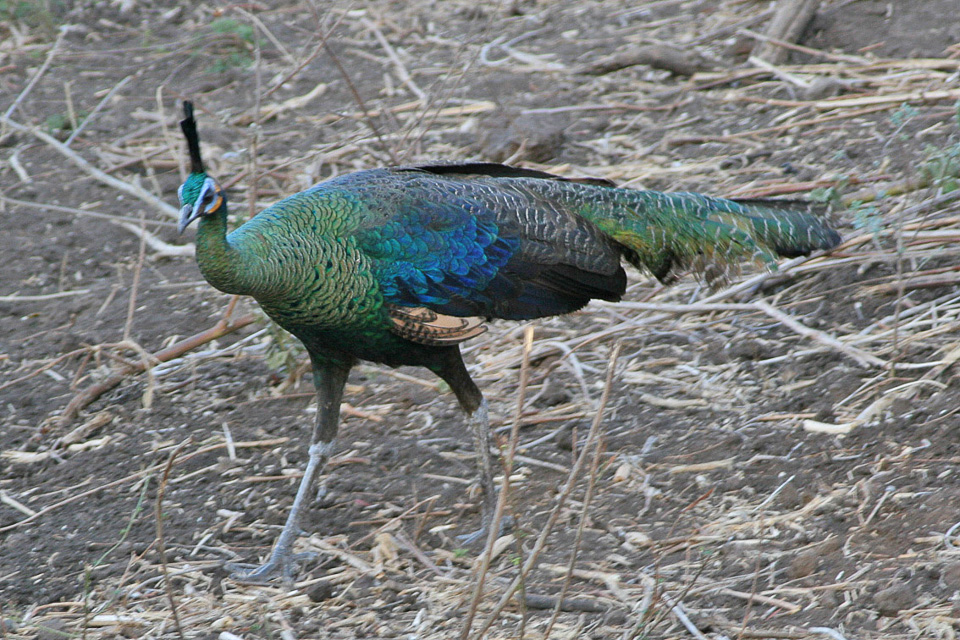
- Female

Conservation status
- Endangered (IUCN 3.1)
- CITES Appendix II

Scientific classification
- Kingdom: Animalia
- Phylum: Chordata
- Class: Aves
- Order: Galliformes
- Family: Phasianidae
- Genus: Pavo
- Species: P. muticus

Binomial name
- Pavo muticus Linnaeus, 1766

Subspecies
- P. m. muticus Linnaeus, 1766; P. m. spicifer Shaw, 1804; P. m. imperator Delacour, 1949
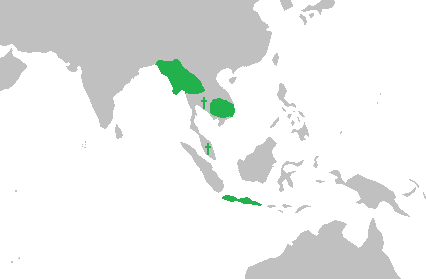
- Range of the green peafowl

= Green peafowl =

Species of bird

The green peafowl (Pavo muticus) is a peafowl species native to the tropical forests of Southeast Asia and Southern China. It is the national bird of Myanmar. Formerly common throughout Southeast Asia, only a few isolated populations survive in Cambodia and adjacent areas of Vietnam. It has been listed as endangered on the IUCN Red List since 2009. This is primarily due to widespread deforestation, agriculture and loss of suitable habitat, severely fragmenting populations and contributing to an overall decline in numbers. The green peafowl is in demand for private and home aviculture and threatened by the pet trade, feather collectors and hunters for meat and targeted.

== Description ==
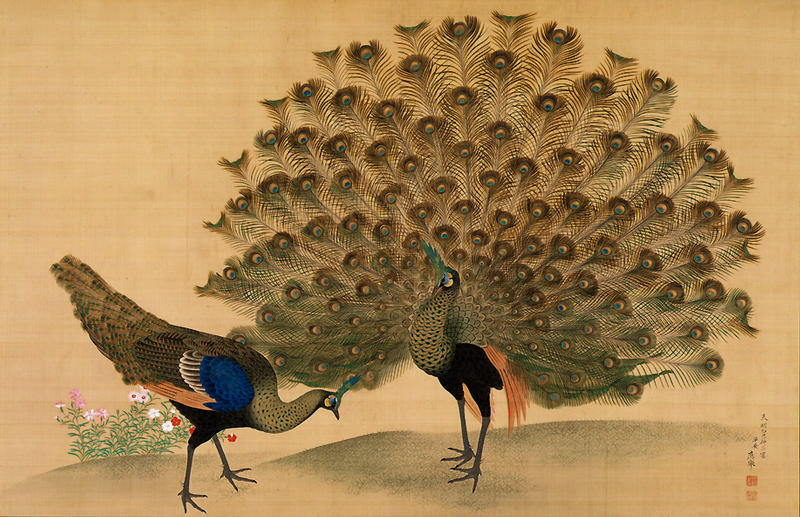
1781 painting by Maruyama Okyo

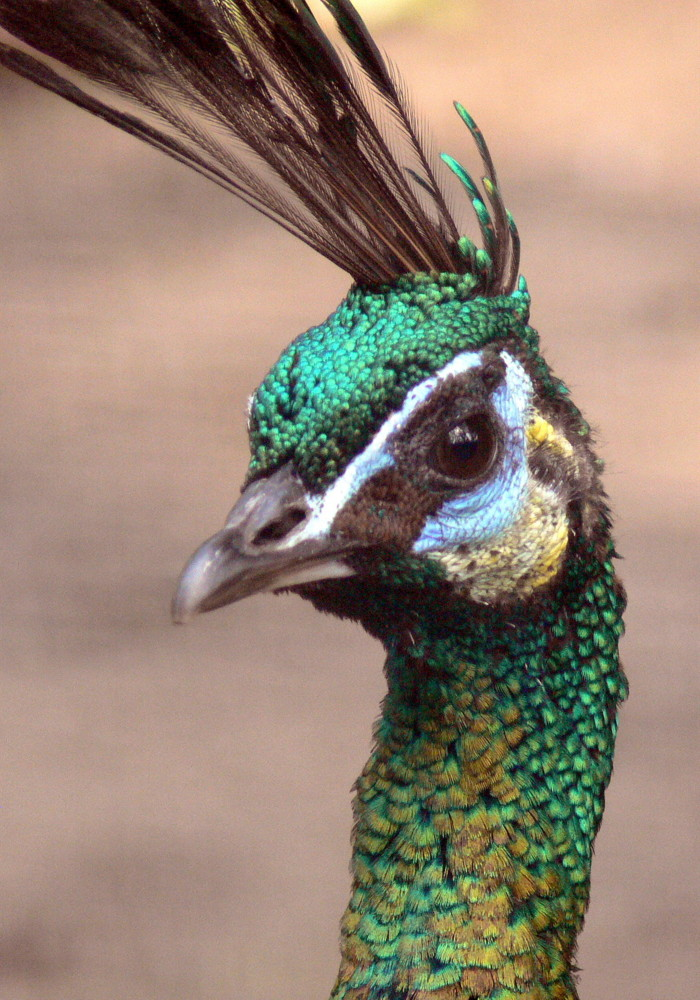
Adult female head and upper neck

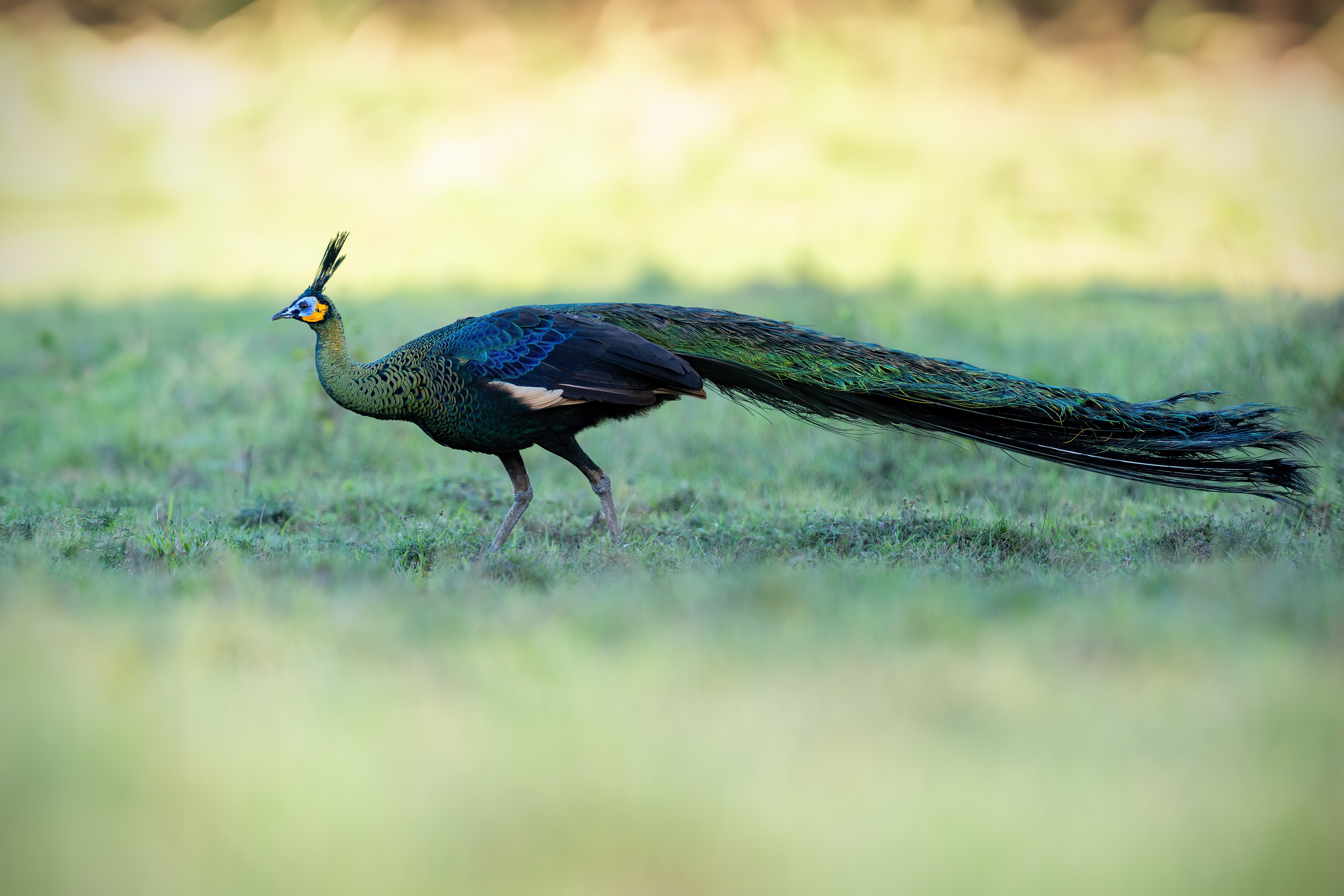
Male profile

The green peafowl is a large bird in terms of overall size. The male is 1.8–3 m (5 ft 11 in – 9 ft 10 in) in total length, including its train, which measures 1.4–1.6 m (4 ft 7 in – 5 ft 3 in); the adult female is around half the total length of the breeding male at 1–1.1 m (3 ft 3 in – 3 ft 7 in) in length. It has a relatively large wingspan that averages around 1.2 m (3 ft 11 in) and can reach 1.6 m (5 ft 3 in) in big males. The green peafowl is capable of sustained (albeit energy-intensive) flight and is often observed on the wing.

Green peafowl males vocalize at their roost sites at dawn and dusk with a loud often repeated ki-wao. The female vocalizes with an equally loud "AOw-aa" call, with an emphasis on the first syllable. The males may also make a similar sound to the females.

The green peafowl has long upper-tail covert feathers. In the male, this extends up to 2 m (6 ft 7 in) and is adorned with eyespots; in the female, the coverts are green and much shorter, just covering the tail. Outside of the breeding season, however, the male's tail coverts (or train) is moulted; distinguishing the sexes during this period can be difficult unless they are observed quite up close. The neck and breast feathers (of both sexes) are highly iridescent green and resemble Chinese dragon scales. In the male, the scapular, median, and greater wing coverts are blue; the lesser coverts are green and form a triangle of scaly shoulder feathers (when the wing is closed). The secondaries are black and, in some subspecies, the tertials are brown and/or barred with a faint pattern. The female has blue lesser coverts, and lacks the triangle at the wing-shoulder. Females also have neck scales fringed with copper, as well as more barring on the back, the primaries and alula. Both sexes have crest feathers, are long-legged, heavy-winged, and long-tailed in silhouette. The crest of the female has slightly wider plumes, while those of the male are thinner but taller. The facial skin is double-striped with a whitish-blue; beside the ear is a yellow-orange crescent. The dark triangle below the eye (towards the eyebrow) is bluish-green in the male, and brown in the female. Seen from a distance, they are generally dark-coloured birds with pale vermilion- or buff-coloured primaries, which are quite visible in their peculiar flight; this action has been described as a true "flapping" flight, lacking the gliding that one associates with many birds.

== Distribution and habitat ==
The green peafowl was widely distributed in Southeast Asia in the past from southern China especially Yunnan, eastern and north-eastern India, southeastern Bangladesh, northern Myanmar, extending through Laos, and Thailand into Vietnam, Cambodia, Peninsular Malaysia, and the island of Java in Indonesia, but in Java they are only found in protected areas such as Ujung Kulon National Park and Baluran National Park. Records from northeastern India have been questioned and old records are possibly of feral birds.

In Cambodia, Keo Seima Wildlife Sanctuary was shown to hold a significant and increasing population of around 745 individuals in 2020.

Green peafowl are found in a wide range of habitats, including primary and secondary forest, both tropical and subtropical, as well as evergreen and deciduous. They may also be found amongst bamboo, on grasslands, savannas, scrub, and farmland edge. In Vietnam, the preferred habitat was found to be dry, deciduous forest close to water and away from human disturbance. In Java they are only found in savanna. Proximity to water appears to be an important factor.

== Taxonomy ==
The species was first classified as Pavo muticus by Carl Linnaeus, although it was previously described in Europe by Ulisse Aldrovandi as "Pavo Iaponensis" based on a Japanese painting given to the pope by the emperor of Japan. These birds were depicted as having no spurs; Linnaeus followed Aldrovandi's description. The Japanese had imported green peafowl from Southeast Asia for hundreds of years, and the birds were frequently depicted in Japanese paintings. As a result, the type locality described by Linnaeus was "Habitat in Japonia", though the species is not native to Japan (they were kept by the emperor and no longer occur). François Levaillant was one of the first Western ornithologists to see a live bird, imported from Macau to an animal collection in Cape of Good Hope. From an Indian painting, George Shaw described a peafowl native to India with a "blue head" and an "upright lanceolate crest", which he named Pavo spicifer, the spike-crested peacock. A third form of green peafowl was described in 1949 by Jean Delacour, as P. imperator, found in Indochina. From the advice of a bird dealer in Hong Kong, Delacour concluded there were three races of green peafowl, lumping P. spicifer into the species, as well. Today, most authorities recognise these three:

Image	Subspecies	Description	Distribution
	Pavo muticus muticus, the Java peafowl (nominate)	Often described as the most colourful of the three subspecies, the neck and breast is a metallic golden-green with cerulean blue wing coverts. Females have prominent barring on the back and tertials.	Extant population endemic to the east and western ends of Java, Indonesia. Extinct populations from the Malay Peninsula from the Kra Isthmus extending south to Kedah have also been described as being synonymous with the Javanese population, but no published studies have confirmed this assumption.
	P. m. imperator, the Indo-Chinese peafowl	Imperator is intermediate in colouration between the other two forms.	From east Myanmar to Thailand, Yunnan province in China and Indochina, this subspecies is the most common and has the widest distribution. In Thailand, it is currently confined to the Nan, Yom, Eng and Ping river basins in northern Thailand and the Huai Kha Khaeng and Mae Klong basins in western Thailand. In Vietnam, it has become extinct in the northern part of the country, its last large population being confined to the southeast in Yok Đôn and Cát Tiên National Park.
	P. m. spicifer, the Burmese peafowl	Delacour considered the west and east sides of the Irrawaddy river to be the dividing line between spicifer and imperator respectively. Sometimes described as "duller" than the other forms, it has a matte gun metal-blue to olive-green neck and breast, and more black on the wing-coverts and outer web of secondaries. The crown of the male is violet-blue which often extends further down the nape than other subspecies, demarcating the colours of the crown and neck.	Found in Bangladesh towards southwestern Thailand, formerly also in northern Malaysia. Birds in Northeast India are sometimes considered extinct but are still occasionally sighted. However, sightings have sometimes been questioned as feral or escaped birds. A population of spicifer was reintroduced to Hlawga National Park east of the Irrawaddy river.

Delacour dismissed several aberrant specimens to be individual variations (including the type specimens for imperator originating from the Bolaven Plateau in Laos), and stated more subspecies may be recognised with further studies. However, few studies have been conducted to substantiate Delacour's classification, even though it is accepted by nearly all authorities. Some authors have suggested that the population found in Yunnan, which are traditionally classified as imperator, may be another race. Using the cytochrome b mitochondrial DNA gene, Ouyang et al. estimated the divergence period between green and Indian peafowl to be 3 million years. In the same study, they also noted there appeared to be two different forms of green peafowl in Yunnan which should be classified as distinct subspecies. A 2005 article from The Star newspaper of Malaysia stated that research indicated the Malaysian form to be identical to the Javanese form, but the study was not published and some authors dispute the result. Due to the large range of imperator in Indochina, other subspecies within its range have also been proposed, notably annamensis of Southeast Asia and yunnanensis of Yunnan.

== Behaviour and ecology ==
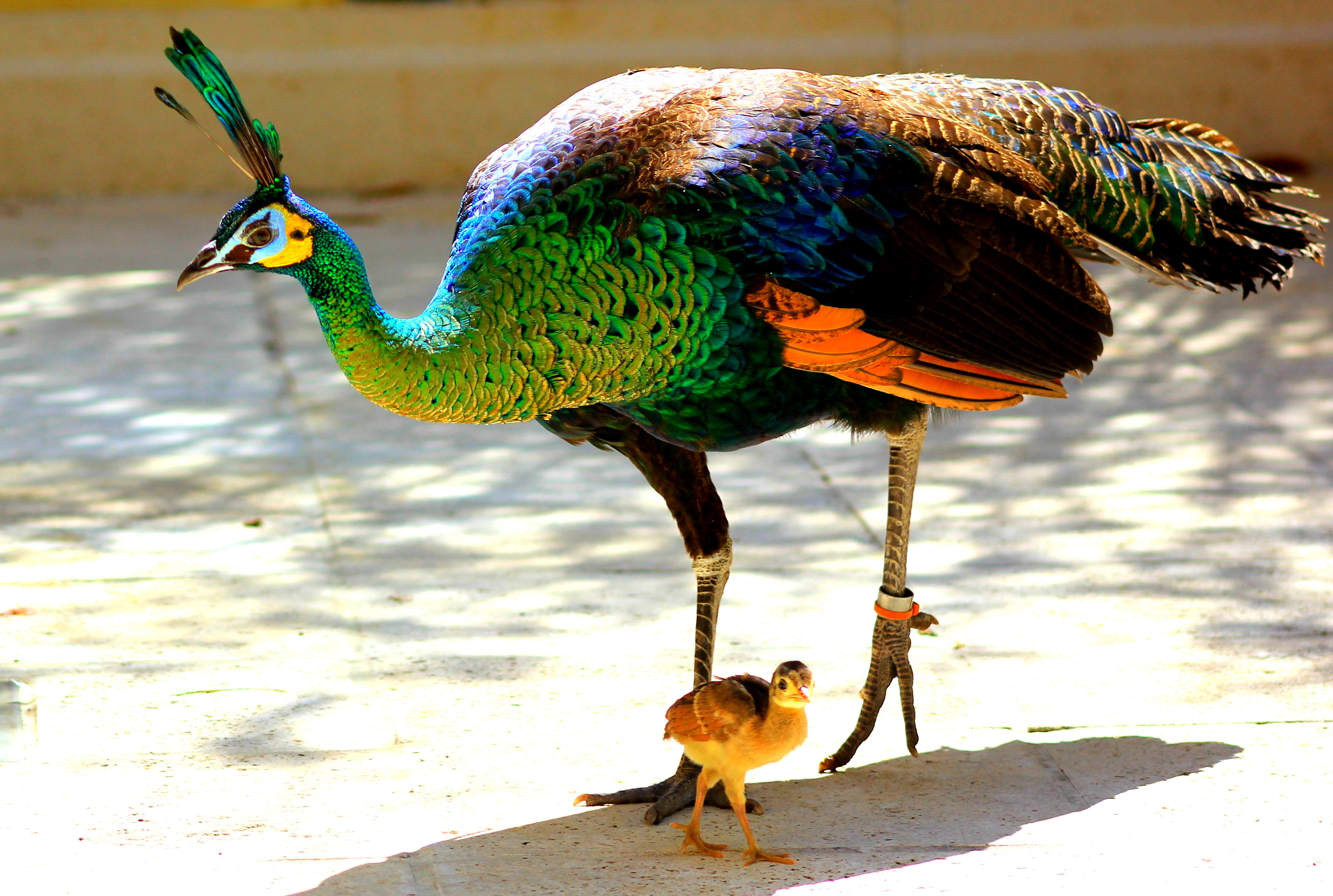
Female (peahen) with one chick

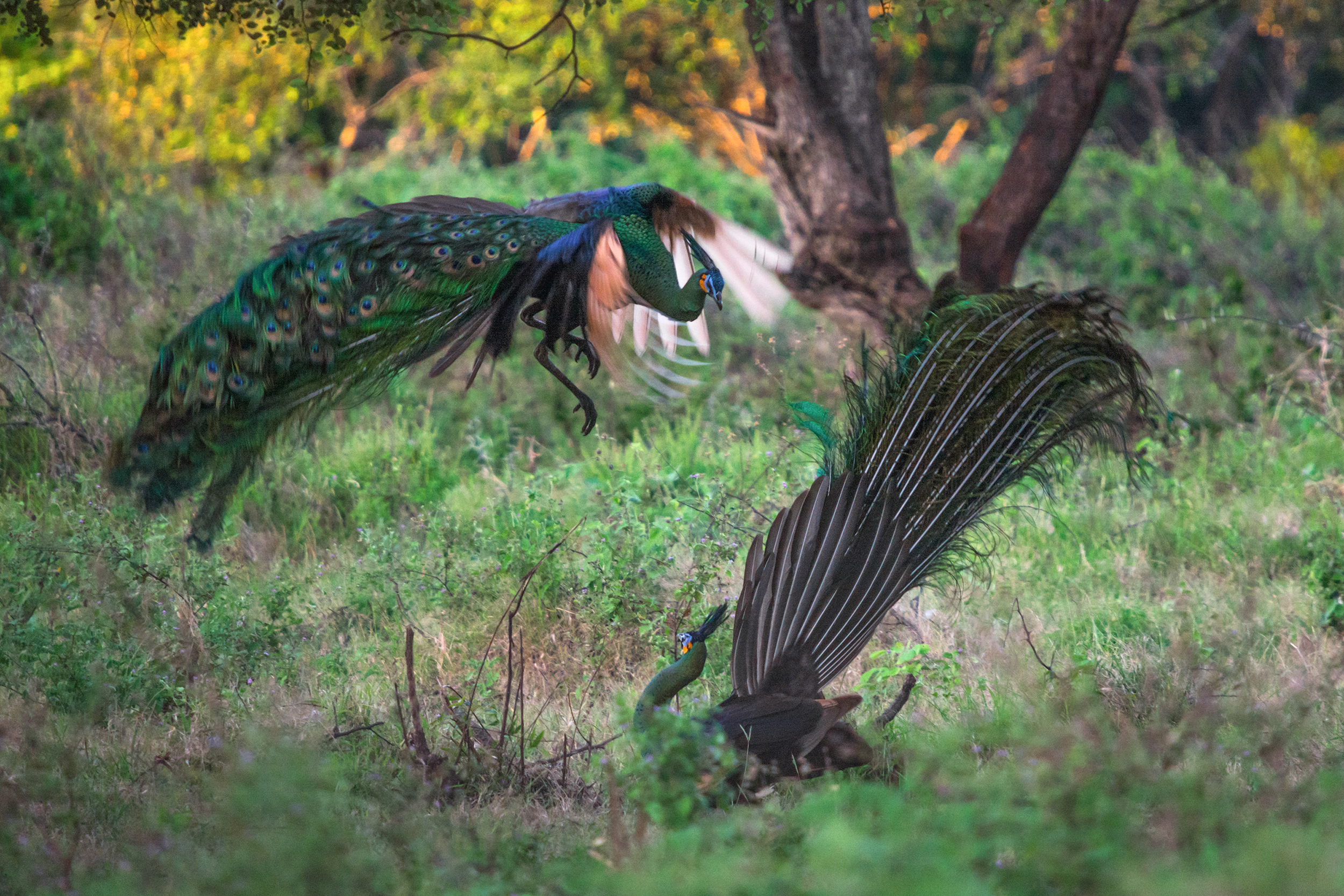
Fighting peacocks in Baluran National Park, Indonesia

The green peafowl is a forest bird which nests on the ground laying an egg clutch with three to six eggs.

It has been widely stated that the green peafowl is polygynous, but males are solitary and do not display in leks. Instead the solitary males are highly territorial and form harems with no pair bonds. However, the theory that the male is polygynous also conflicts with observations in captivity; pairs left alone with no human interaction have been observed to be strongly monogamous. The close similarity between both sexes also suggests a different courtship display in contrast to that of the Indian peafowl. Thus, some authors have suggested that the harems seen in the field are juvenile birds and that males are not promiscuous.

They usually spend time on or near the ground in tall grasses and sedges. Family units roost in trees at a height of 10–15 m (33–49 ft).

== Threats ==
Due to hunting, especially poaching, and a reduction in extent and quality of habitat, the green peafowl is evaluated as endangered on the IUCN Red List of Threatened Species. The world population has declined rapidly, and the species no longer occurs in many areas of its past distribution. The population in the wild was estimated to be about 5,000 to 10,000 individuals around 1995.

Although there is no natural range overlap with the Indian peafowl, hybridisation is still a threat where the Indian peafowl is introduced as they produce fertile hybrids. In captivity hybrids are called "Spalding" peafowl and are used by breeders to create different breeds. Through backcrossing some hybrids become almost indistinguishable from pure green peafowl.

== Conservation ==
The green peafowl is listed on Appendix II of CITES. The last strongholds are in protected areas such as Huai Kha Khaeng Wildlife Sanctuary in Thailand, Cat Tien National Park in Vietnam and Baluran National Park, Ujung Kulon National Park in Java, Indonesia.

In 2005, the World Pheasant Association reportedly conducted reintroductions in Malaysia. Genetic research allegedly proved that the Javan and Malay peafowl are genetically identical, and the subspecies muticus was introduced based on scientific community consensus. However, the assumption that the Malaysian and Javanese muticus birds are the same subspecies remains controversial, so it is uncertain which subspecies was introduced.

In China, the Yunnan Green Peafowl case was a landmark 2020 environmental lawsuit in which the courts ordered the suspension of a hydropower project on the Jiasa River after discovery of green peafowls living in areas potentially affected. It marked China’s first preventive public‑interest litigation for wildlife conservation and established a precedent for proactive biodiversity protection.

== Cultural significance ==
The green peacock was a royal symbol of Burma's monarchs

The flag of the National League for Democracy party features a stylised fighting peacock next to a star.

In Myanmar, the green peafowl was an ancient symbol of the country's monarchs. In ancient China, where peacocks were once more widespread, the peacock was known as a bird of "Jiude", the nine virtues. According to the Book of Zhou, these nine virtues are loyalty, trustworthiness, respectfulness, firmness, gentleness, harmony, steadfastness, integrity, and filiality. Beginning in the Ming Dynasty, 3rd ranked civil servants wore buzi, an embroidered patch on the front of one's uniform, featuring a peacock to symbolizing their virtues. In the Qing Dynasty, peacock feathers called Huayi (花翎) decorated the hats of officials, with sanyan huayi or three peacock feathers reserved for the highest rank.

It was also shown during British colonial times on the flag of the governor and the naval ensign, as well as on the flag of the State of Burma from 1943 to 1945 and on the currency of independent Burma as well.
