= Baluran National Park =

National park on the island of Java in Indonesia

- Taman Nasional Baluran
- IUCN category II (national park)
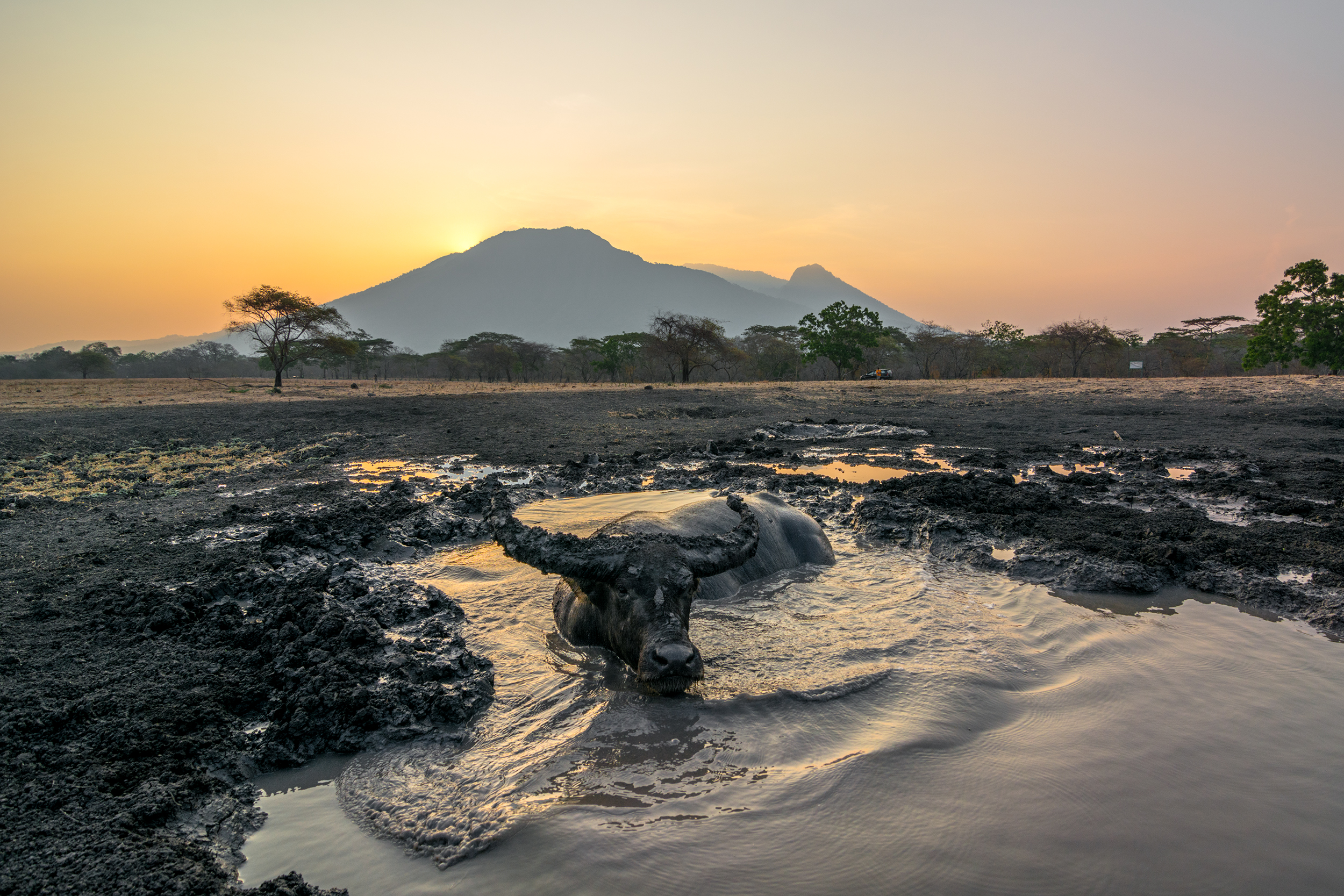
- Buffalo at Bekol Savannah, Baluran National Park

- Location within Java
- Location: Situbondo Regency, East Java, Indonesia
- Nearest city: Situbondo
- Coordinates: 7°50′S 114°22′E
- Area: 250 km^{2} (97 sq mi)
- Established: 1980
- Visitors: 10,192 (in 2007)
- Governing body: Ministry of Environment and Forestry
- Website: balurannationalpark.web.id

Baluran National Park is located in Situbondo Regency, East Java, Indonesia. It has a relatively dry climate and mainly consists of savanna (40%), as well as lowland forests, mangrove forests and hills, with Mount Baluran (1,247m) as its highest peak.

Baluran National Park is located at the north-eastern extremity of Java, close to the islands of Bali and Madura. The park is bordered by the Madura Strait to the north, the Bali Strait to the east, the river Bajulmati (Wonorejo village) to the west and the river Klokoran (Sumberanyar village) to the south. The park is a rough circle, with the extinct volcano, Baluran, at its centre. Its total area is 25,000 ha. It consists of five zones: the Main Zone (12,000 ha), the Wilderness Zone (5,537 ha, comprising 1,063 ha water and 4,574 ha land), the Intensive Utilization Zone (800 ha), the Specific Utilization Zone (5,780 ha) and the Rehabilitation Zone (783 ha).

== Flora and fauna ==
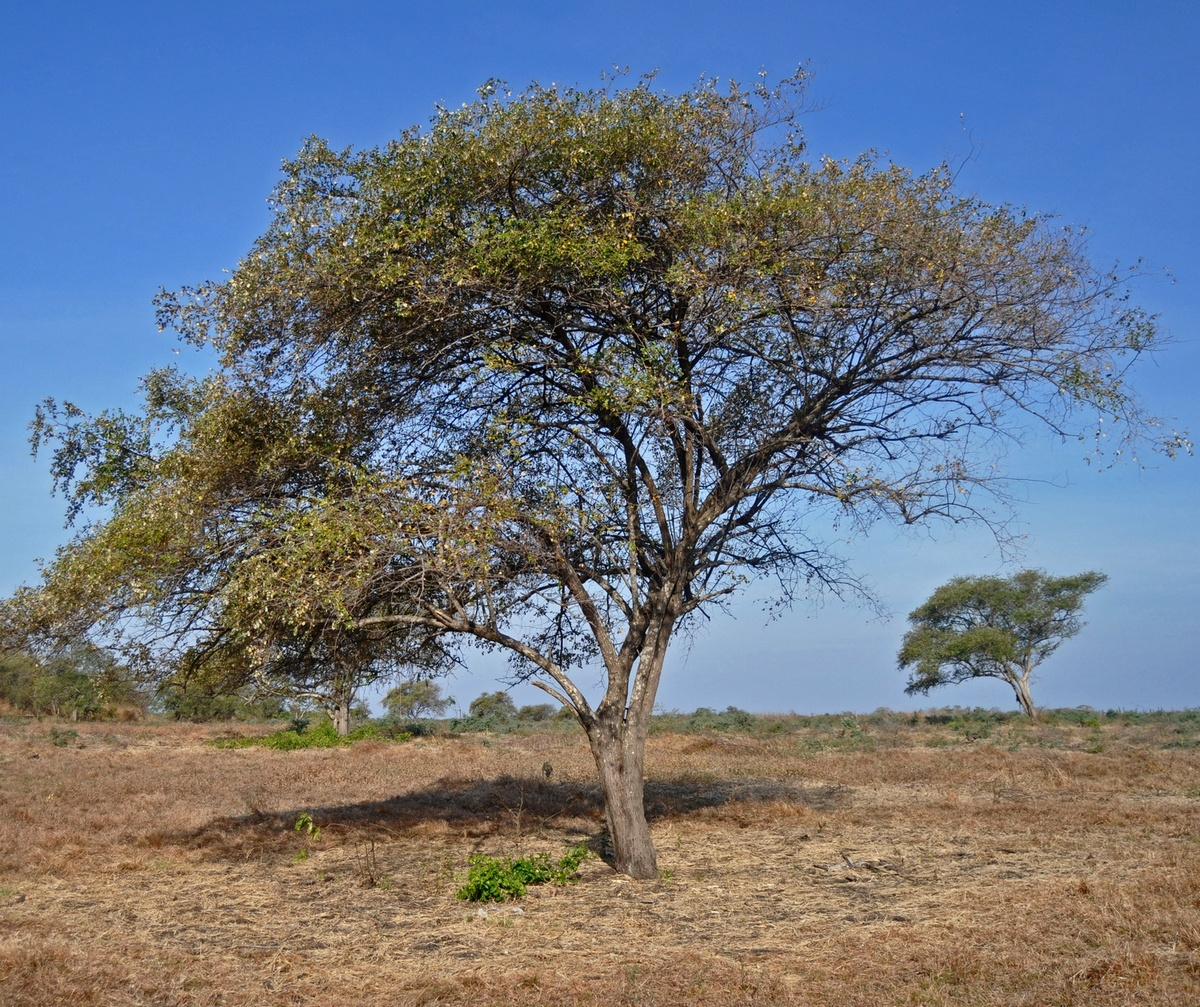
Ziziphus mauritiana trees in the park

There have been 444 plant species recorded in the park, including some endangered plant species such as: Ziziphus rotundifolia, Tamarindus indica, Dioscorea hispida, Aleurites moluccanus and Corypha utan.

Baluran National Park hosts 26 mammal species, including the endangered Banteng, Sumatran dhole, Indian muntjac, Java mouse-deer, Sunda leopard cat, Javan leopard and Javan lutung. The banteng population decreased from 338 in 1996 to just 26 in 2012. This is caused by invasive species such as Acacia nilotica and the water buffalo. However, intensive breeding efforts have increased the population to around 200 individuals by 2020.

Avifauna in the park include the green peafowl, red junglefowl, oriental pied hornbill, rhinoceros hornbill and lesser adjutant. Until 2010, there had been 155 species of bird recorded in the park, but following a bird photography competition in 2012, the number of species was revised to 196.

=== Extinct ===
Javan tigers survived in the protected area until the mid-1960s.

== Conservation and threats ==
The area has been protected since 1928, first initiated by the Dutch hunter A.H. Loedeboer. In 1937 it was declared a wildlife refuge by the Dutch colonial government. In 1980 the area was declared a national park.

Poaching poses a major threat to the wildlife in the park, especially to the decreasing banteng population. According to ProFauna Indonesia, not only locals but also members of the military have been involved in poaching.

The thorny acacia, which occupied at least 6,000 hectares of savannah at the Baluran National Park, has made it increasingly difficult for bantengs to find food. In 2013, there were only 35 bantengs, while in 1996 there were still 320 bantengs.

== Gallery ==
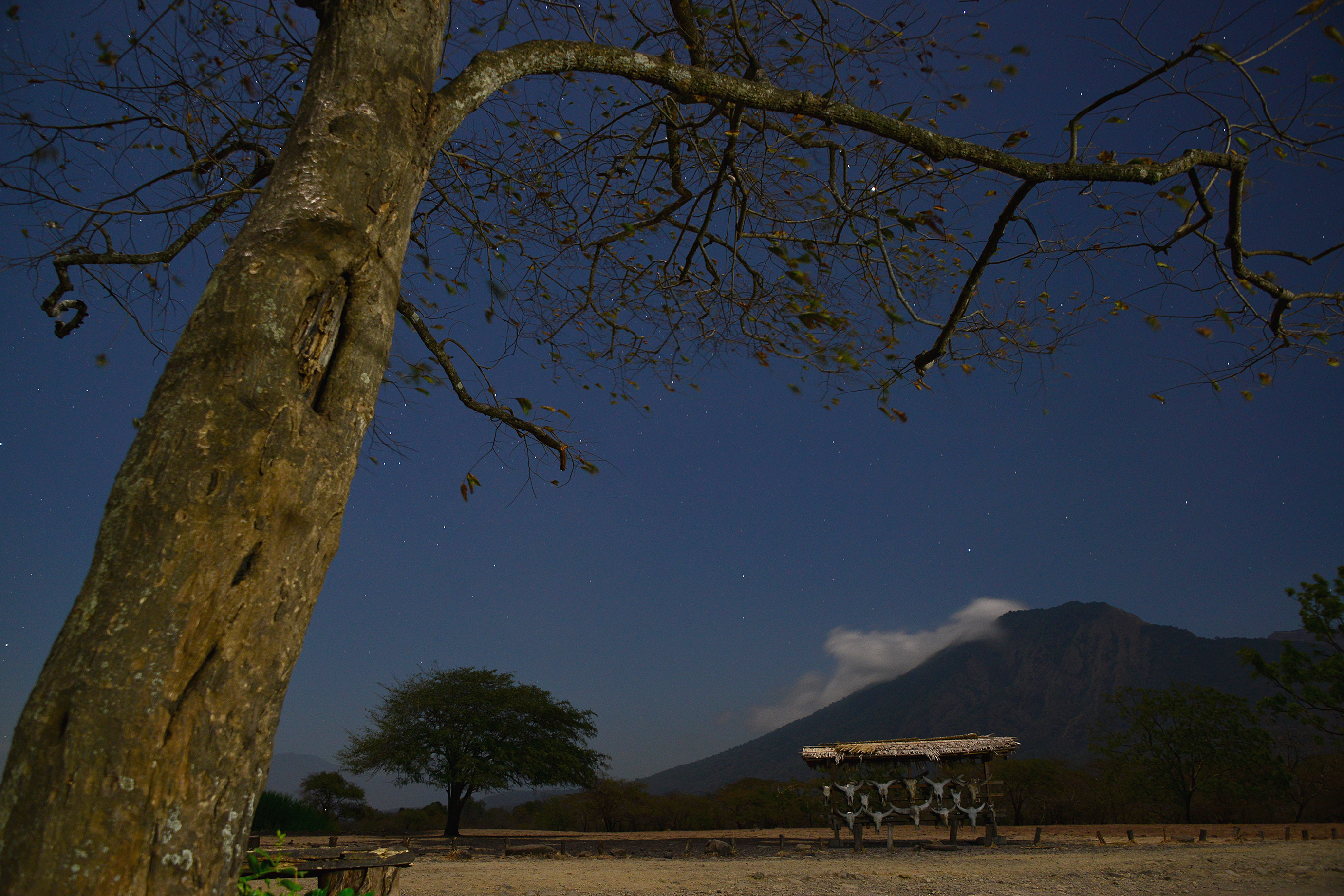
Mount Baluran

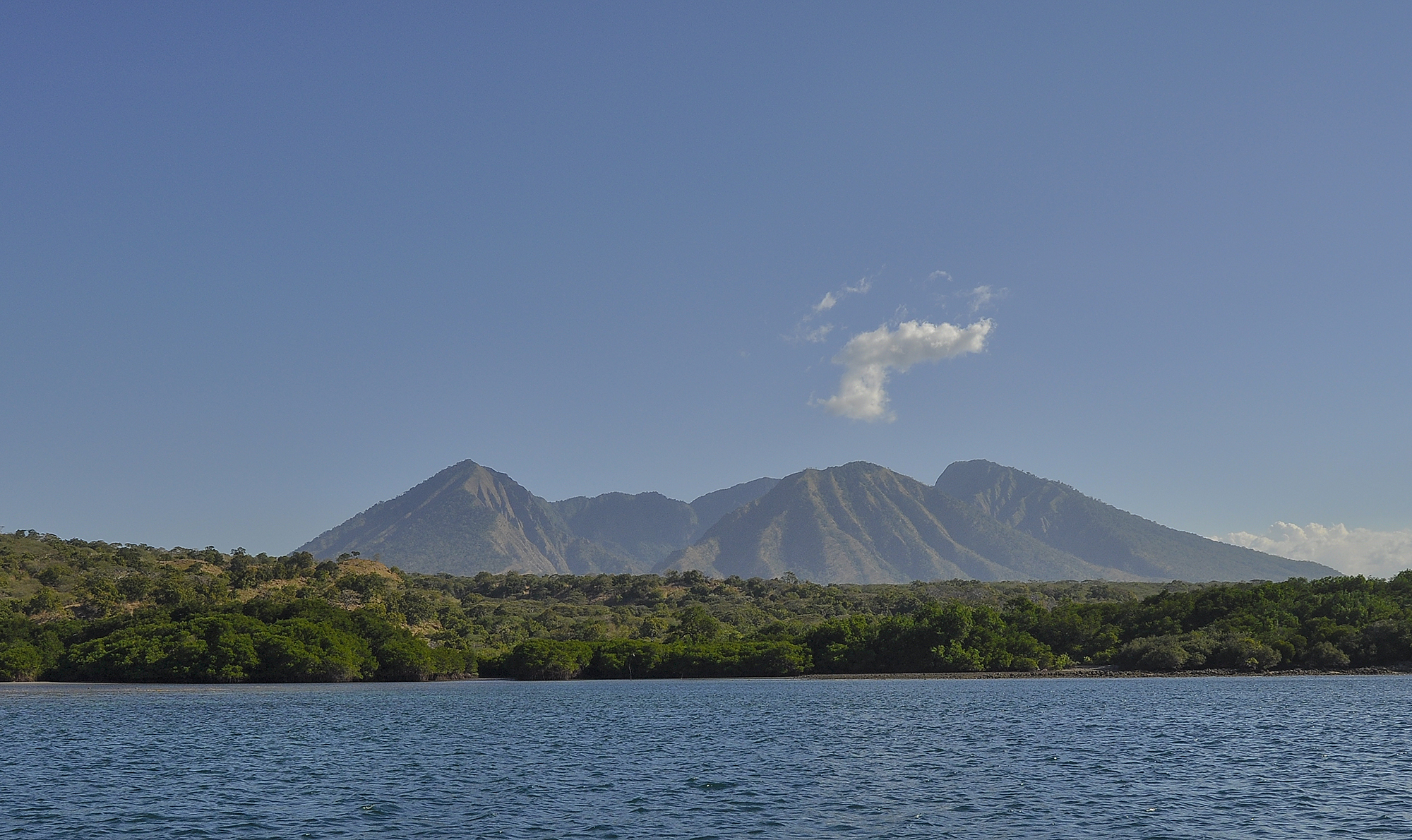

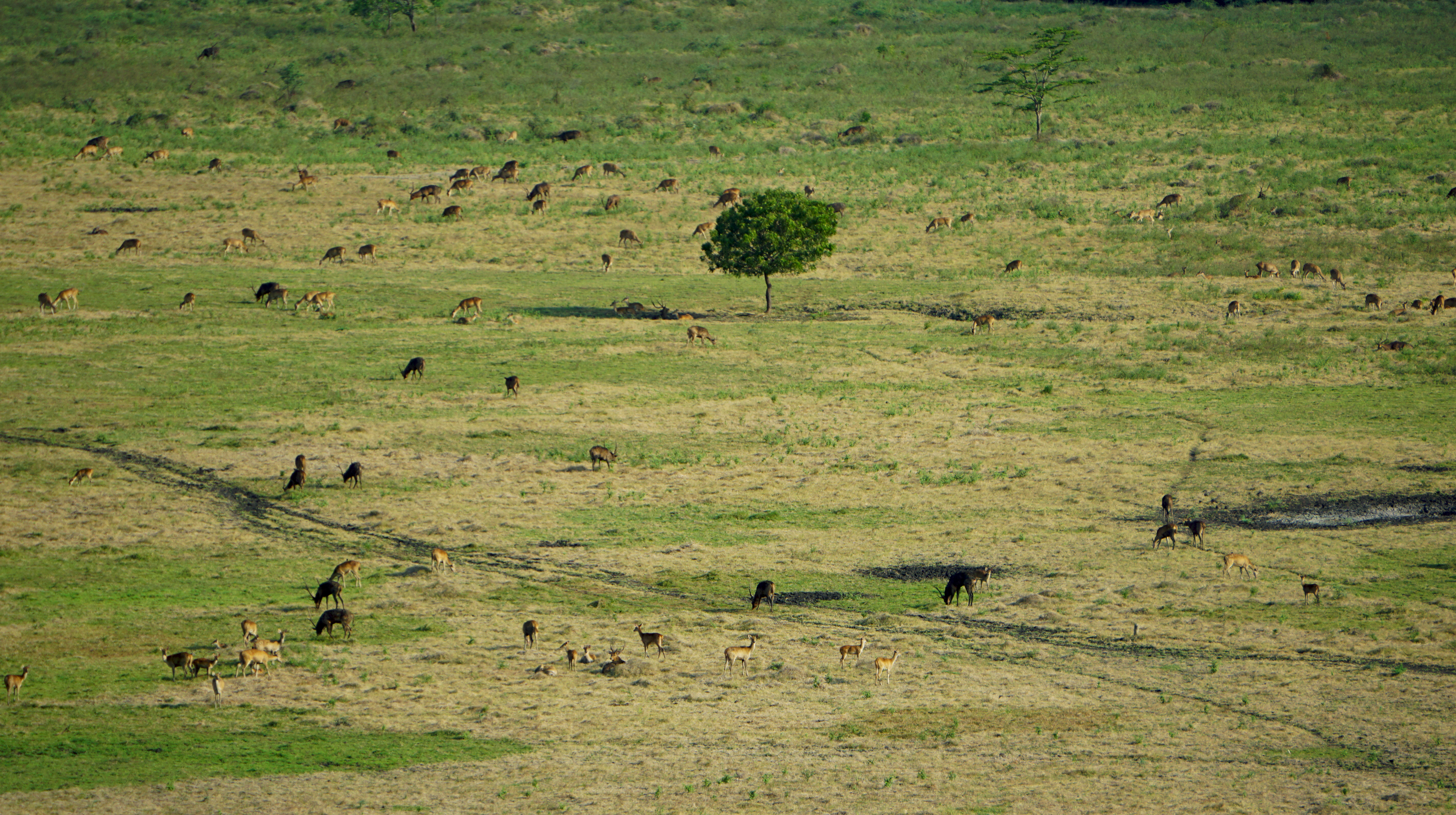

== See also ==
- Geography of Indonesia
