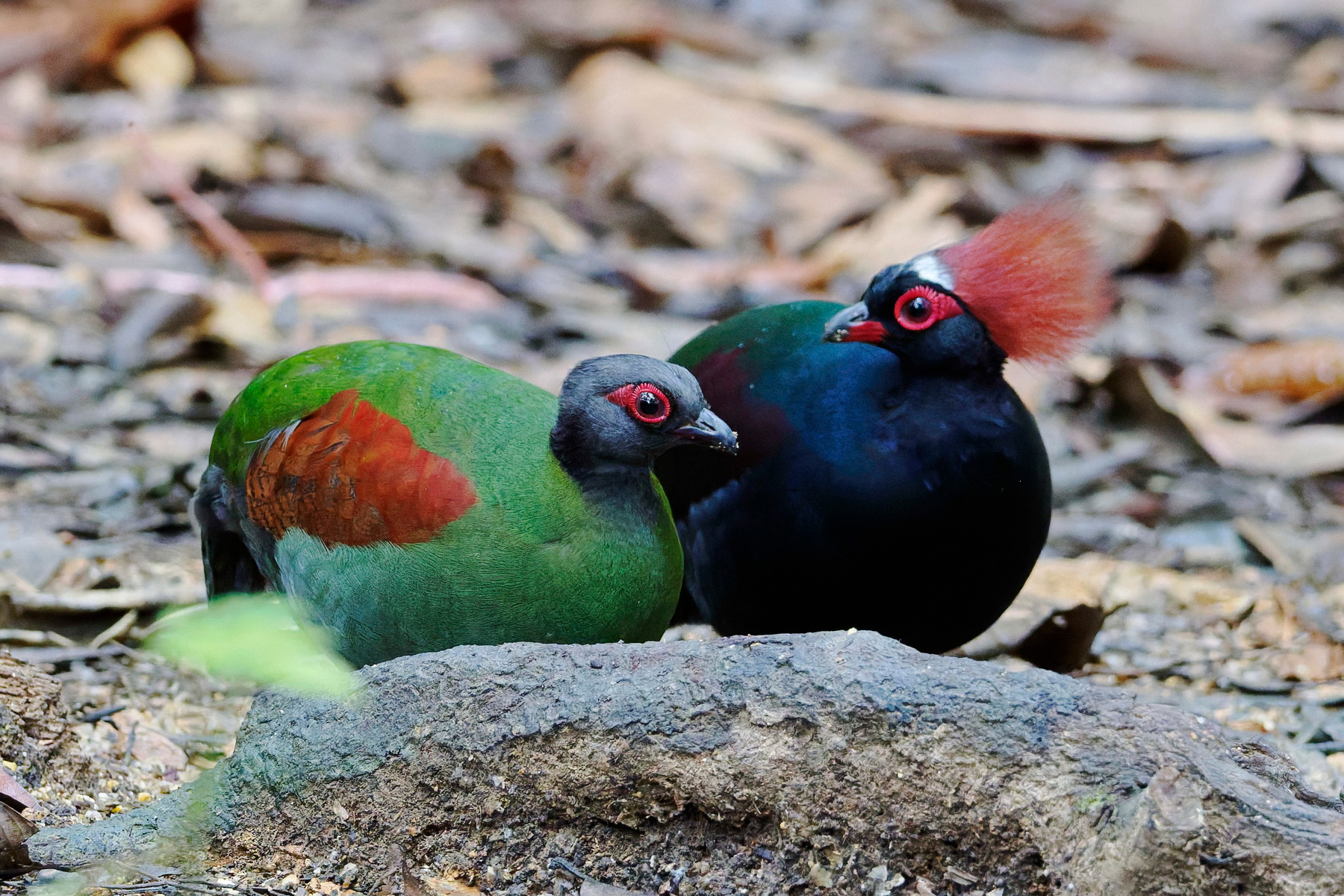
- Crested partridge (Rollulus rouloul) pair (female on left)

Scientific classification
- Kingdom: Animalia
- Phylum: Chordata
- Class: Aves
- Order: Galliformes
- Family: Phasianidae
- Subfamily: Rollulinae; Bonaparte, 1850

Genera
- Arborophila; Caloperdix; Melanoperdix; Rollulus; Xenoperdix

Synonyms
- Arborophilinae

= Rollulinae =

Subfamily of birds

Rollulinae is a bird subfamily containing the jungle and wood partridges. They are sister to all other members of the family Phasianidae, having diverged during the late Eocene or early Oligocene, about 30-35 million years ago. Many taxonomists formerly placed this subfamily within the Perdicinae, but more recent studies have affirmed its existence, and it is accepted by taxonomic authorities such as the International Ornithological Congress.

Members of this family are mostly found in east and southeast Asia, but a single genus, which is sister to all other genera in the family, contains two species endemic to two mountain ranges in Tanzania.

== Species in taxonomic order ==
This list is ordered to show presumed relationships between species.

Image	Genus	Living species
	Xenoperdix	Udzungwa forest partridge, Xenoperdix udzungwensis
	Caloperdix	Ferruginous partridge, Caloperdix oculeus
	Rollulus	Crested partridge, Rollulus rouloul
	Melanoperdix	Black partridge, Melanoperdix niger
	Arborophila	Hill partridge (Arborophila torqueola); Sichuan partridge (Arborophila rufipectus); Chestnut-breasted partridge (Arborophila mandellii); White-necklaced (or collared) partridge (Arborophila gingica); Rufous-throated partridge (Arborophila rufogularis); Red-billed partridge (Arborophila rubrirostris); Siamese partridge (Arborophila diversa); Chestnut-headed partridge (Arborophila cambodiana); Hainan partridge (Arborophila ardens); Taiwan partridge (Arborophila crudigularis); White-cheeked partridge (Arborophila atrogularis); Bar-backed partridge (Arborophila brunneopectus); Orange-necked partridge (Arborophila davidi); Red-breasted (or Bornean) partridge (Arborophila hyperythra); Malayan partridge (Arborophila campbelli); Roll's partridge (Arborophila rolli); Sumatran partridge (Arborophila sumatrana); Chestnut-bellied partridge (Arborophila javanica); Grey-breasted (or white-faced) partridge (Arborophila orientalis)
