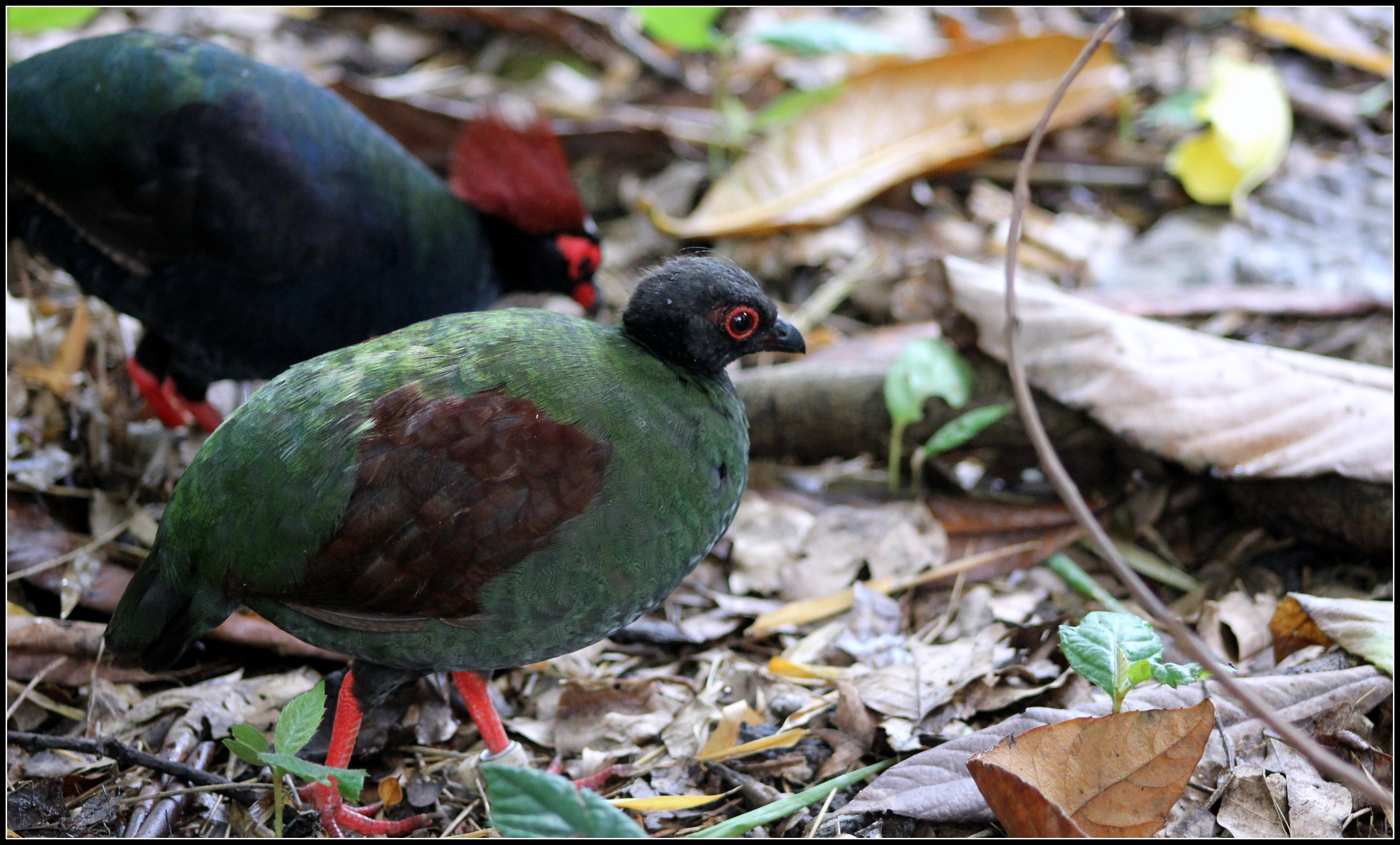
- Crested wood partridge (Rollulus rouloul)

Scientific classification
- Kingdom: Animalia
- Phylum: Chordata
- Class: Aves
- Order: Galliformes
- Superfamily: Phasianoidea

Groups included
- Ptilopachus; Dendrortyx; Rollulinae; Lerwa; Tetraophasis; Rhizothera; Perdix; Alectoris; Ammoperdix; Margaroperdix; Tropicoperdix; Haematortyx; Bambusicola

Cladistically included but traditionally excluded taxa
- Numididae; Colinus; Callipepla; Oreortyx; Philortyx; Cyrtonyx; Rhynchortyx; Dactylortyx; Odontophorus; Ithaginis; Tragopan; Lophophorus; Pucrasia; Meleagridini; Tetraonini; Phasianini; Ophrysia; Perdicula; Coturnix; Synoicus; Tetraogallus; Pternistis; Galloperdix; Polyplectron; Pavonini; Francolinina; Gallus

= Partridge =

Common name for a type of bird

A partridge is a medium-sized galliform bird in any of several genera, with a wide native distribution throughout parts of Europe, Asia and Africa. Several species have been introduced to the Americas. They are sometimes grouped in the Perdicinae subfamily of the Phasianidae (pheasants, quail, etc.). However, molecular research suggests that partridges are not a distinct taxon within the superfamily Phasianoidea, but that some species are closer to the pheasants, while others are closer to the junglefowl.

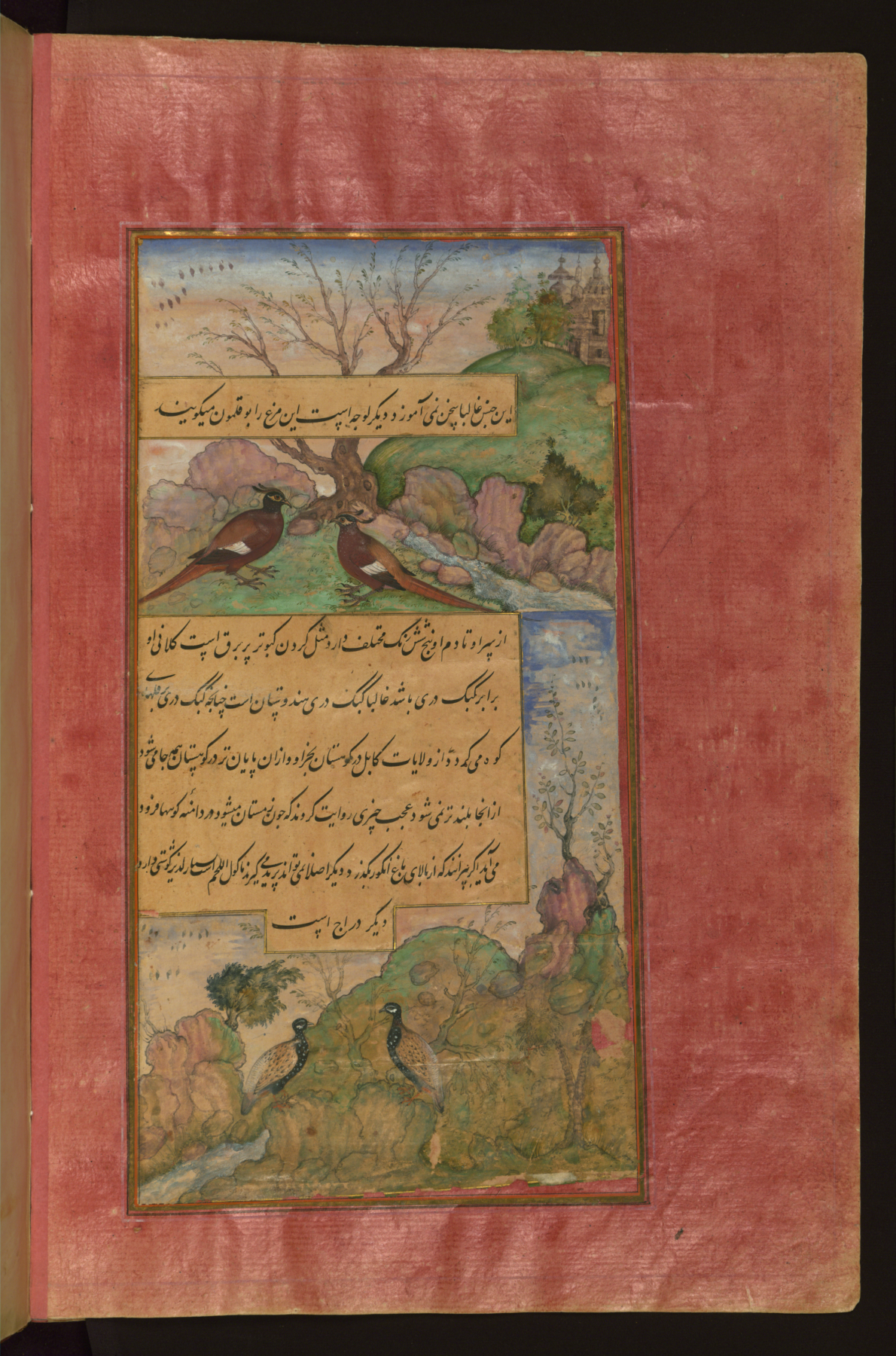
Birds of Persia luchas, called būqalamūn (بوقلمون turkey in Persian), and partridges

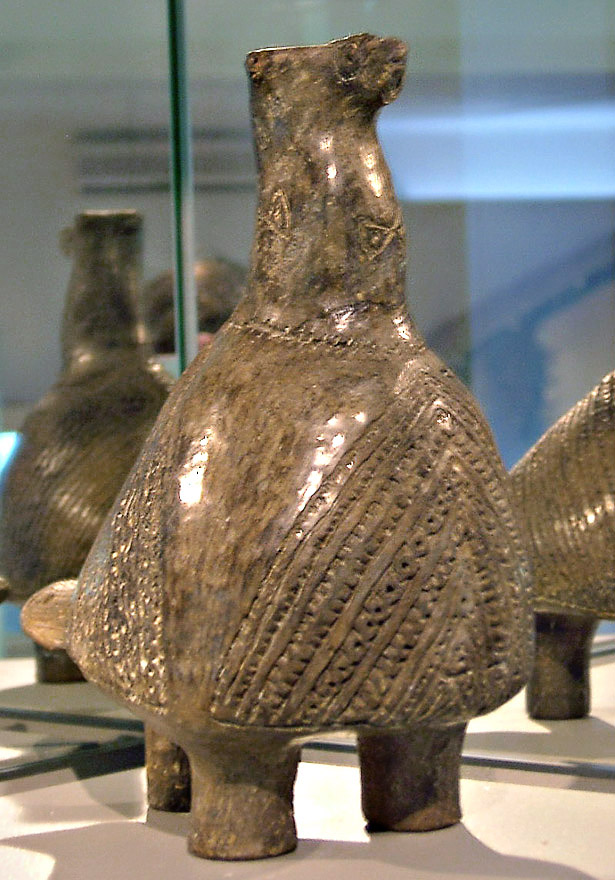
The so-called "Vučedol dove", one of the most well-known emblems of the prehistorical Vučedol culture, is now interpreted as representing a male partridge as a symbol of fertility

== Description ==
Partridges are medium-sized game birds, generally intermediate in size between the larger pheasants and smaller quail; they're ground-dwelling birds that feature variable plumage colouration across species, with most tending to grey and brown.

== Range and habitat ==
Partridges are native to Europe, Asia, Africa, and the Middle East. Some species are found nesting on steppes or agricultural land, while other species prefer more forested areas. They nest on the ground and have a diet consisting of seeds and insects.

== Hunting ==
Species such as the grey partridge and the red-legged partridge are popular as game birds, and are often reared in captivity and released for the purpose of hunting. For the same reason, they have been introduced into large areas of North America.

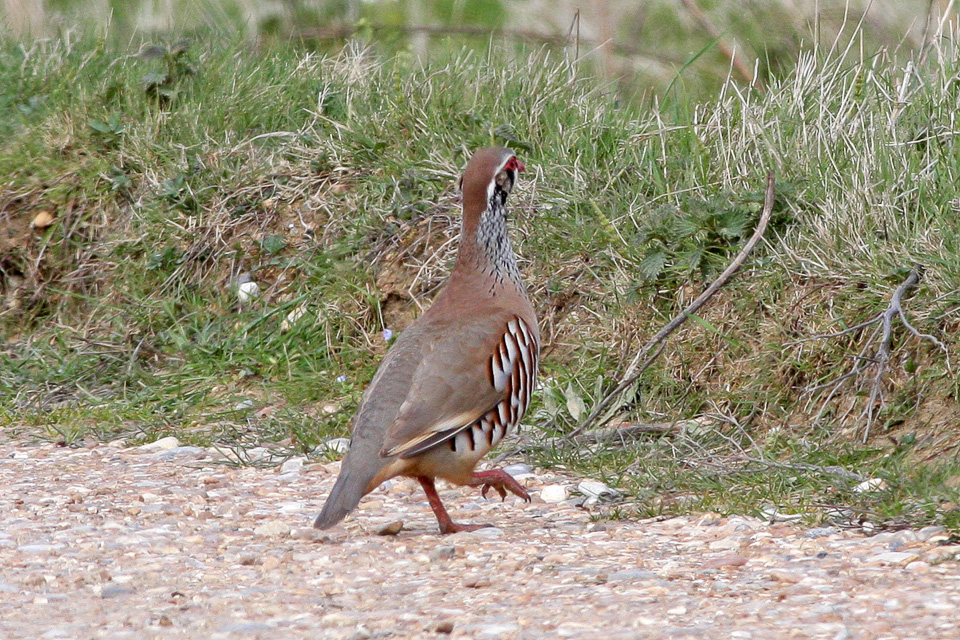
Red-legged partridge.

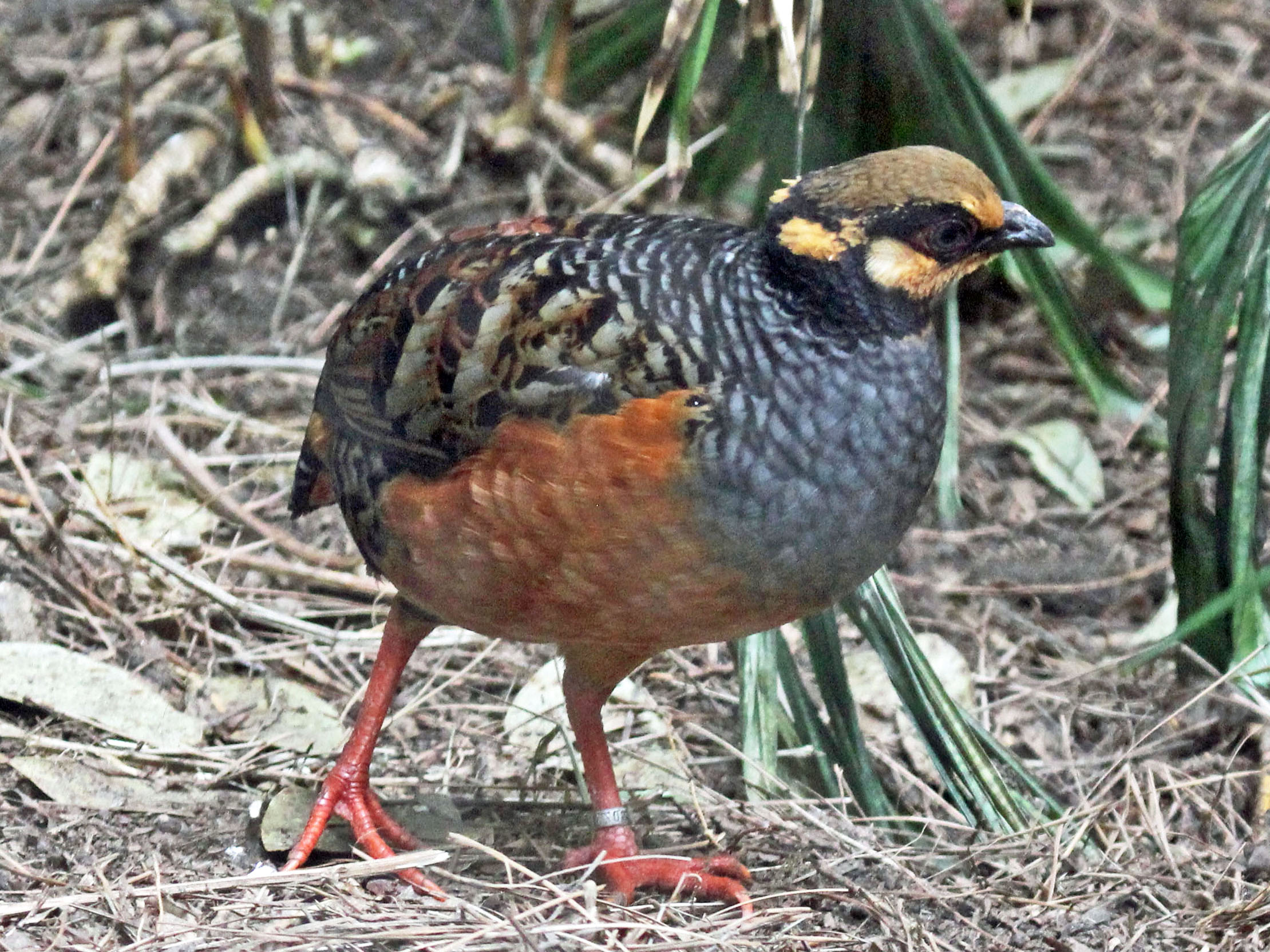
Chestnut-bellied partridge.

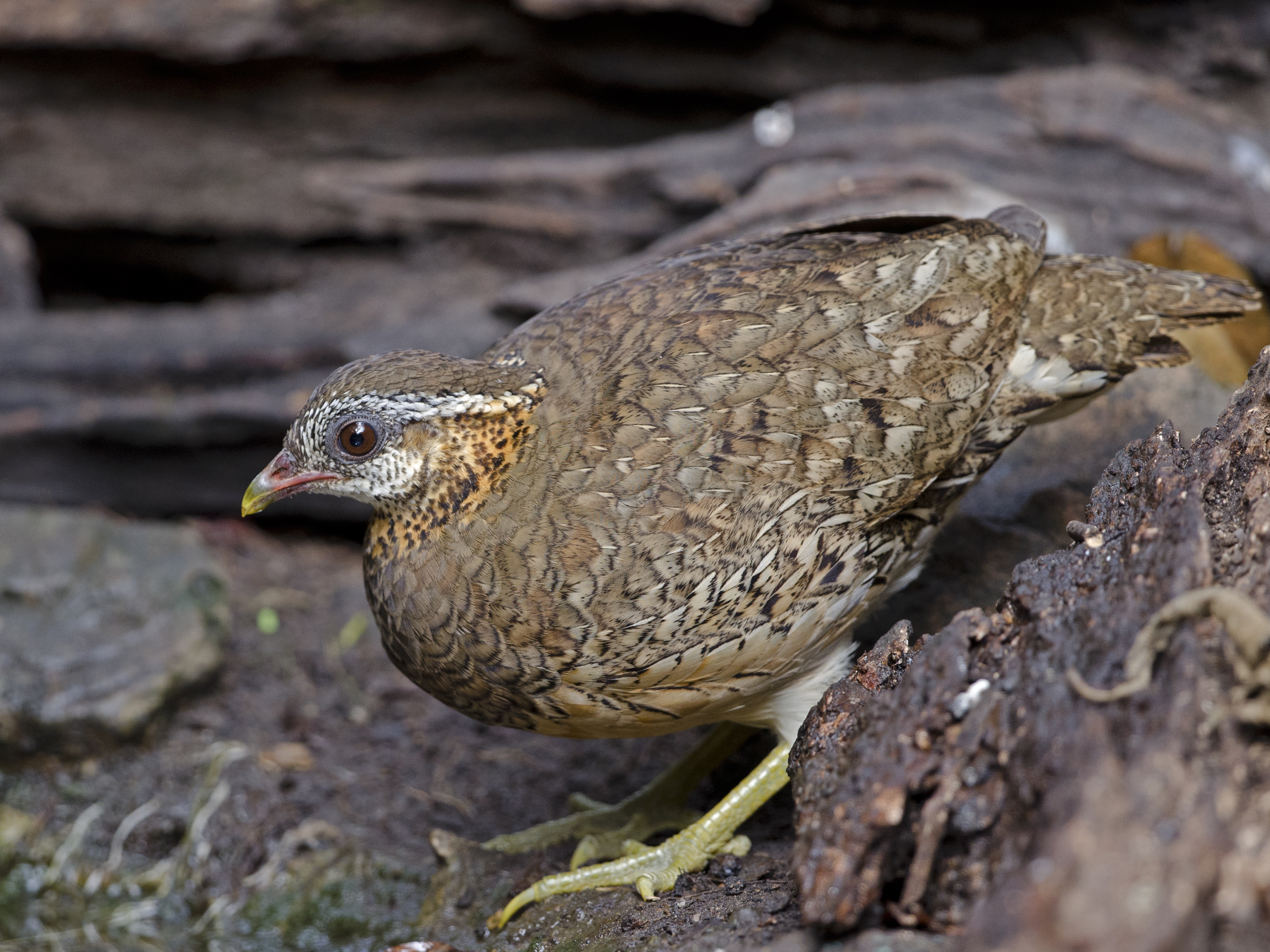
Scaly-breasted partridge.

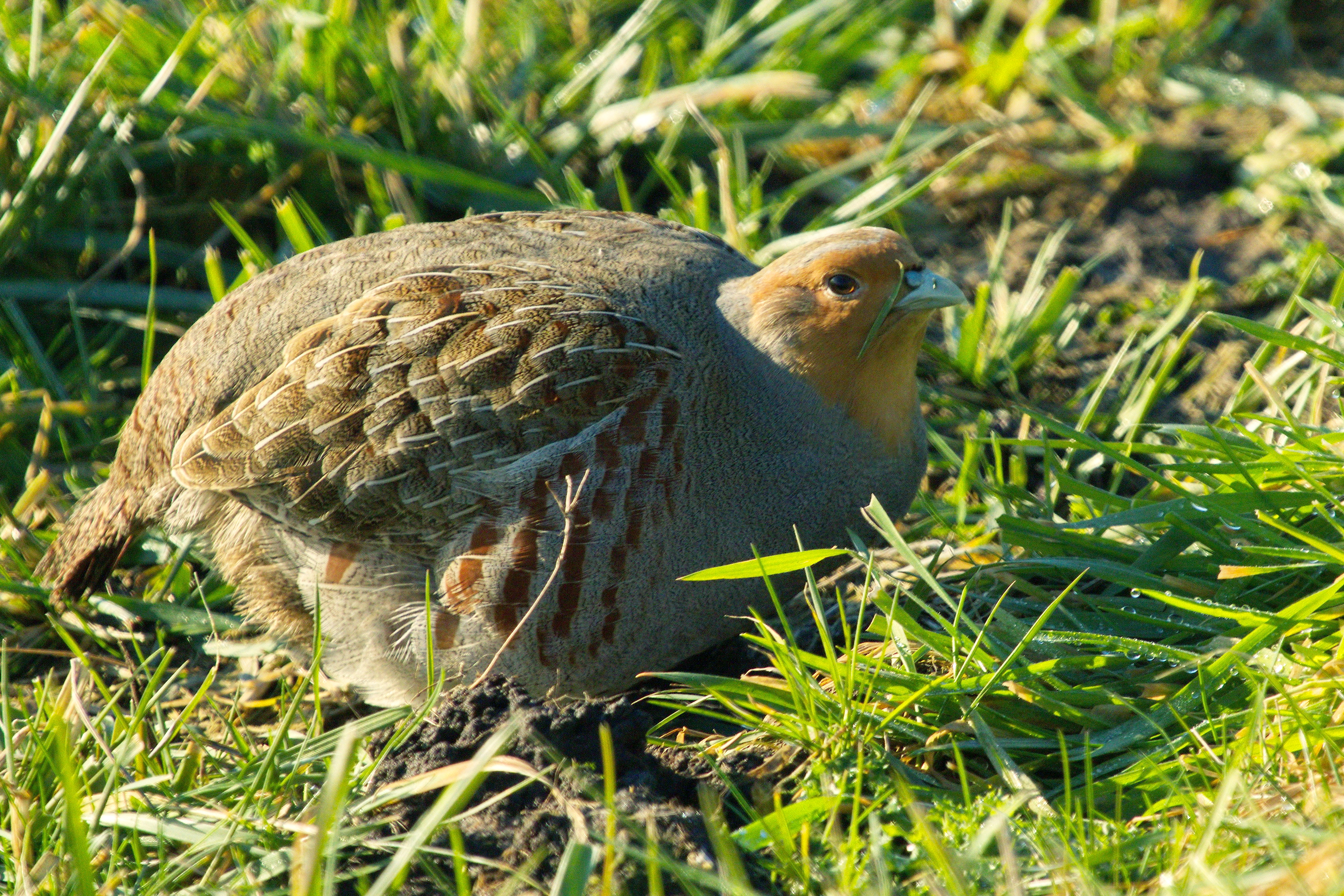
Grey partridge.

== Cultural references ==
According to Greek legend, the first partridge appeared when Daedalus threw his apprentice, Talos, off the sacred hill of Athena in a fit of jealous rage. Supposedly mindful of his fall, the bird does not build its nest in the trees, nor take lofty flights and avoids high places.

As described by medieval scholar Madeleine Pelner Cosman, medical practitioners in the Middle Ages recommended partridge as a food of love: They suggested that "Partridge was superior in arousing dulled passions and increasing the powers of engendering. Gentle to the human stomach, partridge stimulated bodily fluids, raised the spirits, and firmed the muscles."

Probably the most famous reference to the partridge is in the Christmas carol, "The Twelve Days of Christmas". The first gift listed is "a partridge in a pear tree", and these words end each verse. Since partridges are unlikely to be seen in pear trees (they are ground-nesting birds) it has been suggested that the text "a pear tree" is a corruption of the French "une perdrix" (a partridge).

The partridge has also been used as a symbol that represents Kurdish nationalism. It is called Kew. Sherko Kurmanj discusses the paradox of symbols in Iraq as an attempt to make a distinction between the Kurds and the Arabs. He says that while Iraqis generally regards the palm tree, falcon, and sword as their national symbols, the Kurds consider the oak, partridge, and dagger as theirs.

In Hinduism, the Taittiriya Shakha of the Krishna Yajurveda is named after the tittiri, the Sanskrit word for partridge. According to legend, on the command of his angered guru Vaishampayana, Yajnavalkya regurgitates the Yajurveda. The other disciples of Vaisampayana transform themselves into partridges and eagerly pick up the jumbled, but complete, knowledge, explaining the namesake and the mixed format of the recension.

== Species list in taxonomic order ==
- Genus Lerwa
  - Snow partridge, Lerwa lerwa
- Genus Tetraophasis
  - Verreaux's monal-partridge, Tetraophasis obscurus
  - Szechenyi's monal-partridge, Tetraophasis szechenyii
- Genus Alectoris
  - Arabian partridge, Alectoris melanocephala
  - Przevalski's partridge, Alectoris magna
  - Rock partridge, Alectoris graeca
  - Chukar, Alectoris chukar
  - Philby's partridge, Alectoris philbyi
  - Barbary partridge, Alectoris barbara
  - Red-legged partridge, Alectoris rufa
- Genus Ammoperdix
  - See-see partridge, Ammoperdix griseogularis
  - Sand partridge, Ammoperdix heyi
- Genus Perdix
  - Grey partridge, Perdix perdix
  - Daurian partridge, Perdix dauurica
  - Tibetan partridge, Perdix hodgsoniae
- Genus Rhizothera
  - Long-billed partridge, Rhizothera longirostris
  - Dulit partridge, Rhizothera dulitensis
- Genus Margaroperdix
  - Madagascar partridge, Margaroperdix madagascarensis
- Genus Melanoperdix
  - Black wood-partridge, Melanoperdix nigra
- Genus Xenoperdix
  - Rubeho forest partridge, Xenoperdix obscuratus
  - Udzungwa forest partridge, Xenoperdix udzungwensis
- Genus Arborophila, the hill partridges
  - Hill partridge, Arborophila torqueola
  - Sichuan partridge, Arborophila rufipectus
  - Chestnut-breasted partridge, Arborophila mandellii
  - White-necklaced partridge, Arborophila gingica
  - Rufous-throated partridge, Arborophila rufogularis
  - White-cheeked partridge, Arborophila atrogularis
  - Taiwan partridge, Arborophila crudigularis
  - Hainan partridge, Arborophila ardens
  - Chestnut-bellied partridge, Arborophila javanica
  - Grey-breasted partridge, Arborophila orientalis
  - Bar-backed partridge, Arborophila brunneopectus
  - Orange-necked partridge, Arborophila davidi
  - Chestnut-headed partridge, Arborophila cambodiana
  - Red-breasted partridge, Arborophila hyperythra
  - Red-billed partridge, Arborophila rubrirostris
  - Sumatran partridge, Arborophila sumatrana
- Genus Tropicoperdix
  - Scaly-breasted partridge, Tropicoperdix chloropus
  - Chestnut-necklaced partridge, Tropicoperdix charltonii
- Genus Caloperdix
  - Ferruginous partridge, Caloperdix oculea
- Genus Haematortyx
  - Crimson-headed partridge, Haematortyx sanguiniceps
- Genus Rollulus
  - Crested partridge, Rollulus roulroul
- Genus Bambusicola
  - Mountain bamboo partridge, Bambusicola fytchii
  - Chinese bamboo partridge, Bambusicola thoracica

== See also ==
- Dick Potts, English ecologist and specialist in the grey partridge.
