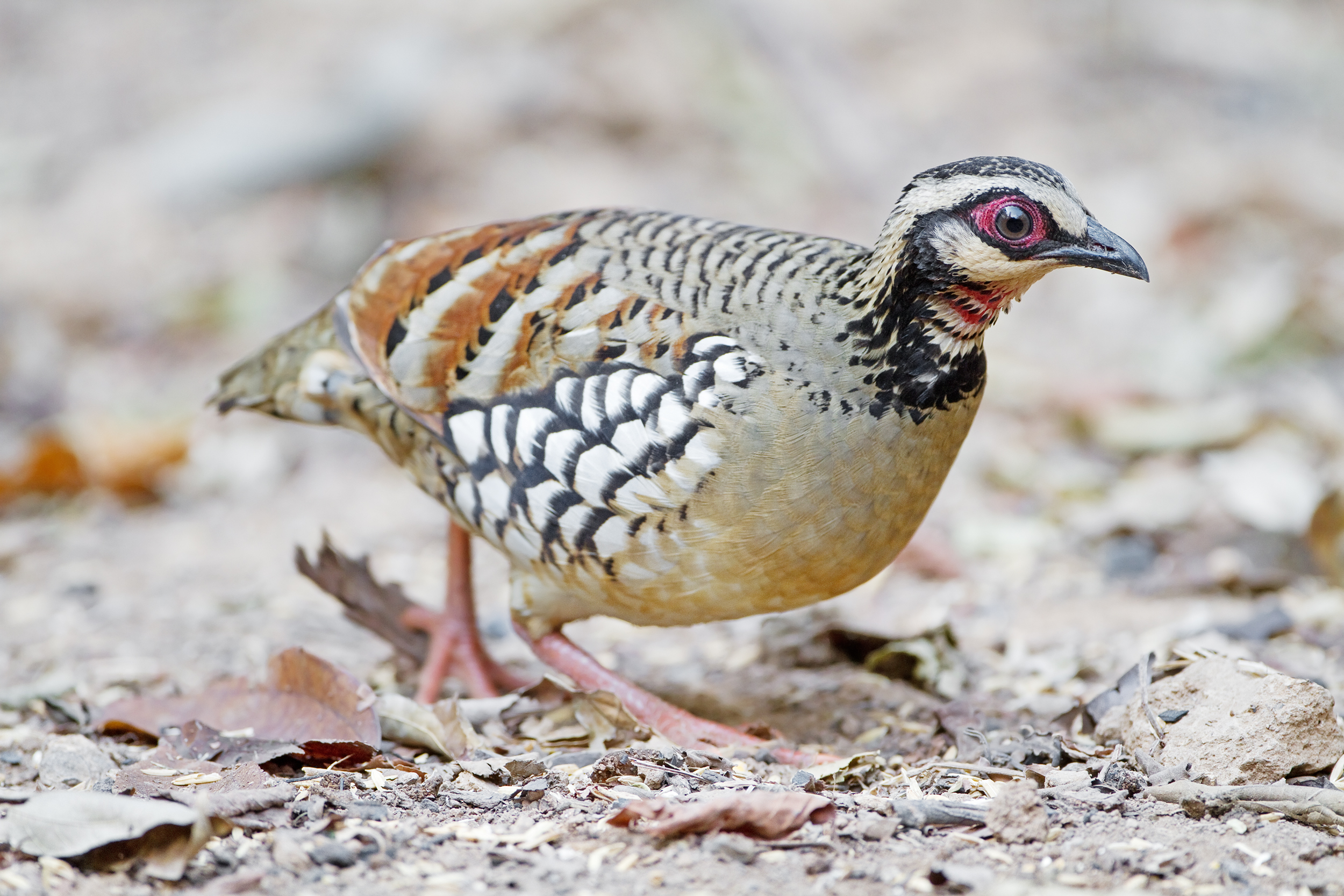
- Male
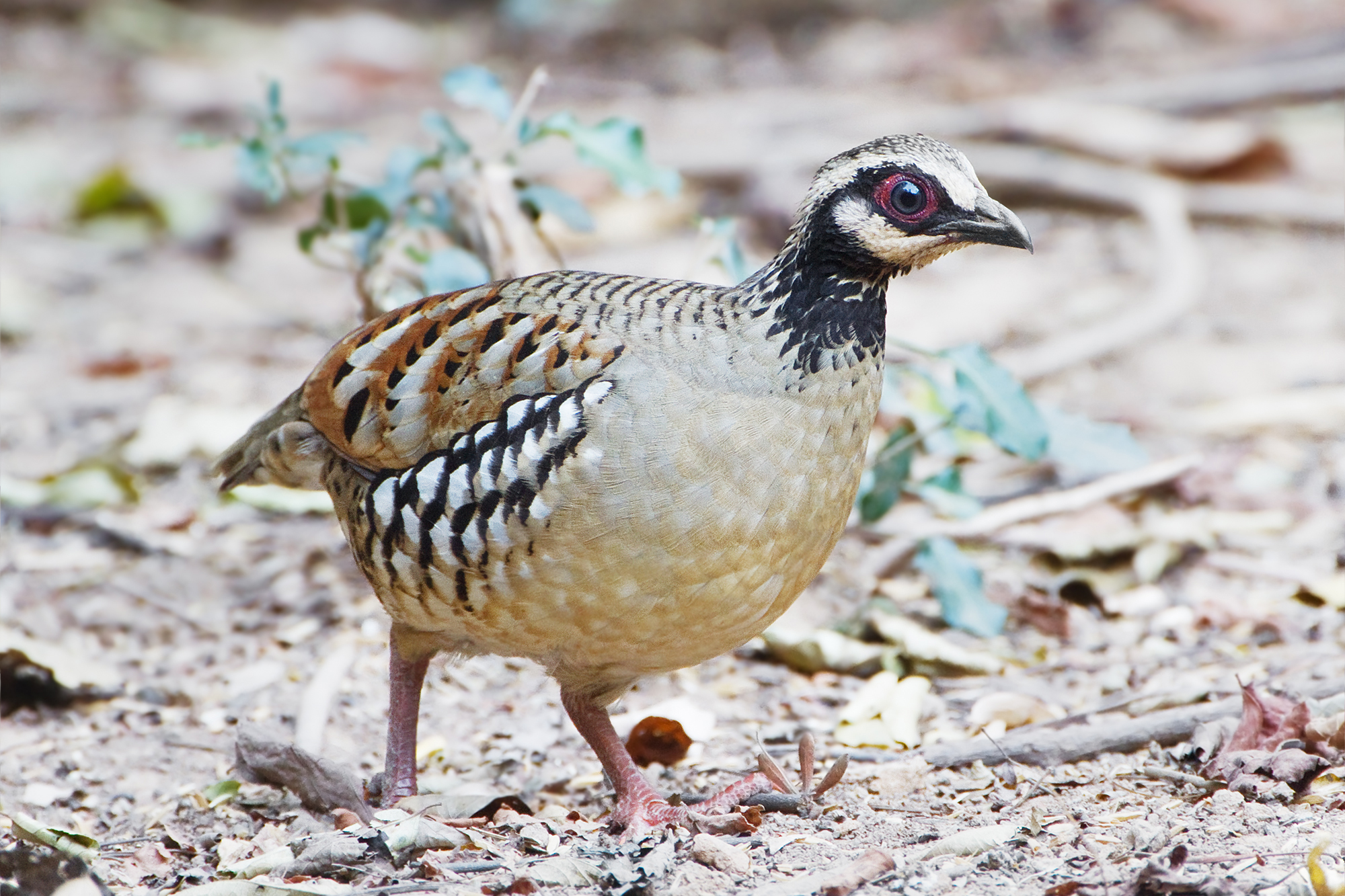
- Female

Conservation status
- Least Concern (IUCN 3.1)

Scientific classification
- Kingdom: Animalia
- Phylum: Chordata
- Class: Aves
- Order: Galliformes
- Family: Phasianidae
- Genus: Arborophila
- Species: A. brunneopectus

Binomial name
- Arborophila brunneopectus (Blyth, 1855)

= Bar-backed partridge =

Species of bird

The bar-backed partridge (Arborophila brunneopectus), also known as the brown-breasted hill-partridge, is a species of partridge in the family Phasianidae. It is found in southwestern China and Southeast Asia.

== Taxonomy ==
English zoologist Edward Blyth first described the bar-backed partridge in 1855.

The bar-backed partridge has three recognized subspecies:

- A. b. albigula (Robinson & Kloss, 1919)
- A. b. brunneopectusI (Blyth, 1855)
- A. b. henrici (Oustalet,1896)

These subspecies differ in colouration and patterns of their underparts and head, respectively. Some identify the chestnut-bellied partridge and grey-breasted partridge or even the Sichuan partridge or red-breasted partridge as superspecies of the bar-backed partridge.

== Description ==
The bar-backed partridge is typically 280 mm (11 in) long in total, with an average wingspan of 144 mm (5.7 in) for males and 134 mm (5.3 in) for females of the species. They usually have 6–7 cm (2.4–2.8 in) tails, and their bills are about 20–21 mm (0.79–0.83 in) in length. On average, males have a 42 mm (1.7 in) tarsus, while females have 39 mm (1.5 in).

The males are similar in color to females. It is mostly buff in color, with black running from the beak, around the eyes, and to the throat, as well as a black crown and feather tips along its back. It has red eyelids, and its wing feathers are white with black tips, adding brown near the back of the bird.

== Distribution and habitat ==
The bar-backed partridge is found in Cambodia, China, Laos, Myanmar, Thailand, and Vietnam over an estimated 486,000 square kilometres (188,000 sq mi).

Its natural habitats are subtropical or tropical moist lowland forests and subtropical or tropical moist montane forests. It is typically found at relatively low elevations, under 3,000 feet (910 m), but have been seen at 5,000 feet (1,500 m) and above.

== Behaviour ==
Two Bar-backed Partridges feeding

They flock in groups of about 4–9, usually consisting of two parents and their latest offspring or sometimes two families. They feed on seeds, small shells, and insects found in leaves on the forest floor. When disturbed by humans, they quickly scatter into the underbrush. Captive male bar-backed partridges attract a mate by exposing the red feathers around their throat and calling. They breed around May to June, and their 37 by 28 mm (1.5 by 1.1 in) eggs are usually laid in a hole covered with bamboo and grass.

== Status ==
The bar-backed partridge has been evaluated as Least Concern by the IUCN due to its large range; however, its population is slowly declining because of habitat loss and hunting, although this decline is not steep enough to make it Vulnerable.
