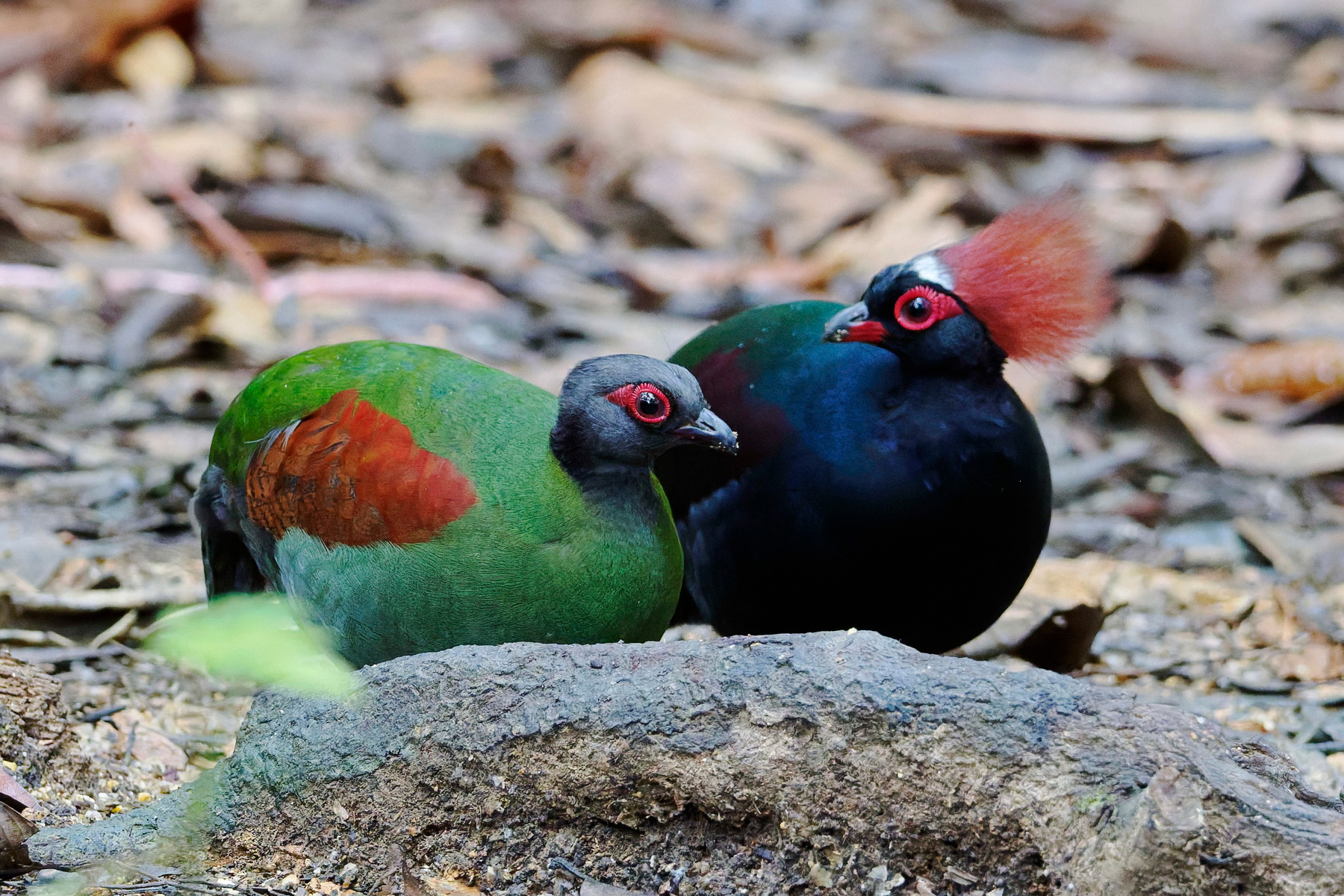
- Female (left) and male, Tambunan, Sabah, Borneo

Conservation status
- Vulnerable (IUCN 3.1)

Scientific classification
- Kingdom: Animalia
- Phylum: Chordata
- Class: Aves
- Order: Galliformes
- Family: Phasianidae
- Subfamily: Rollulinae
- Genus: Rollulus; Bonnaterre, 1791
- Species: R. rouloul

Binomial name
- Rollulus rouloul (Scopoli, 1786)

Synonyms
- Phasianus Rouloul (protonym)

= Crested partridge =

Species of bird

The crested partridge (Rollulus rouloul), also known as the crested wood partridge, roul-roul, red-crowned wood partridge, green wood quail, and green wood partridge is a gamebird in the pheasant family Phasianidae of the order Galliformes, gallinaceous birds. It is the only member of the genus Rollulus.

This small partridge is a resident breeder in lowland rainforests in south Burma, south Thailand, Malaysia, Sumatra and Borneo. Its nest is a ground scrape lined with leaves, which is concealed under a heap of leaf litter. Five or six white eggs are incubated for 18 days.

Unusually for a galliform species, the young are fed bill-to-bill by both parents instead of pecking from the ground, and although precocial, they roost in the nest while small.

The crested partridge is a rotund short-tailed bird, 25 cm (9.8 in) in length, with the male marginally larger than the female. Both sexes have a scarlet patch of bare skin around the eye and red legs without a spur or hind toe.

The male is metallic green above with glossy dark blue underparts and a brownish wing panel. The head is adorned with a tall red crest, a white forehead spot and black frontal bristles. The female has pea-green body plumage apart from the brown wing coverts. She has a slate-grey head with the bristles but no spot or crest. The bill is all-dark. Young birds are duller versions of the adult of the same sex. The song is a mournful whistled si-ul.

The crested partridge is usually seen singly or in pairs as it uses its feet to probe the forest floor for fruit, seeds and invertebrates. When disturbed, it prefers to run but if necessary it flies a short distance on its rounded wings.

There is some concern about the effect of habitat destruction on this bird, especially with regard to logging. However, it seems to be somewhat more adaptable than other southeast Asian pheasants. As of 2021, the crested wood partridge is evaluated as Vulnerable on the IUCN Red List of Threatened Species. It is listed on Appendix III of CITES.

== Gallery ==
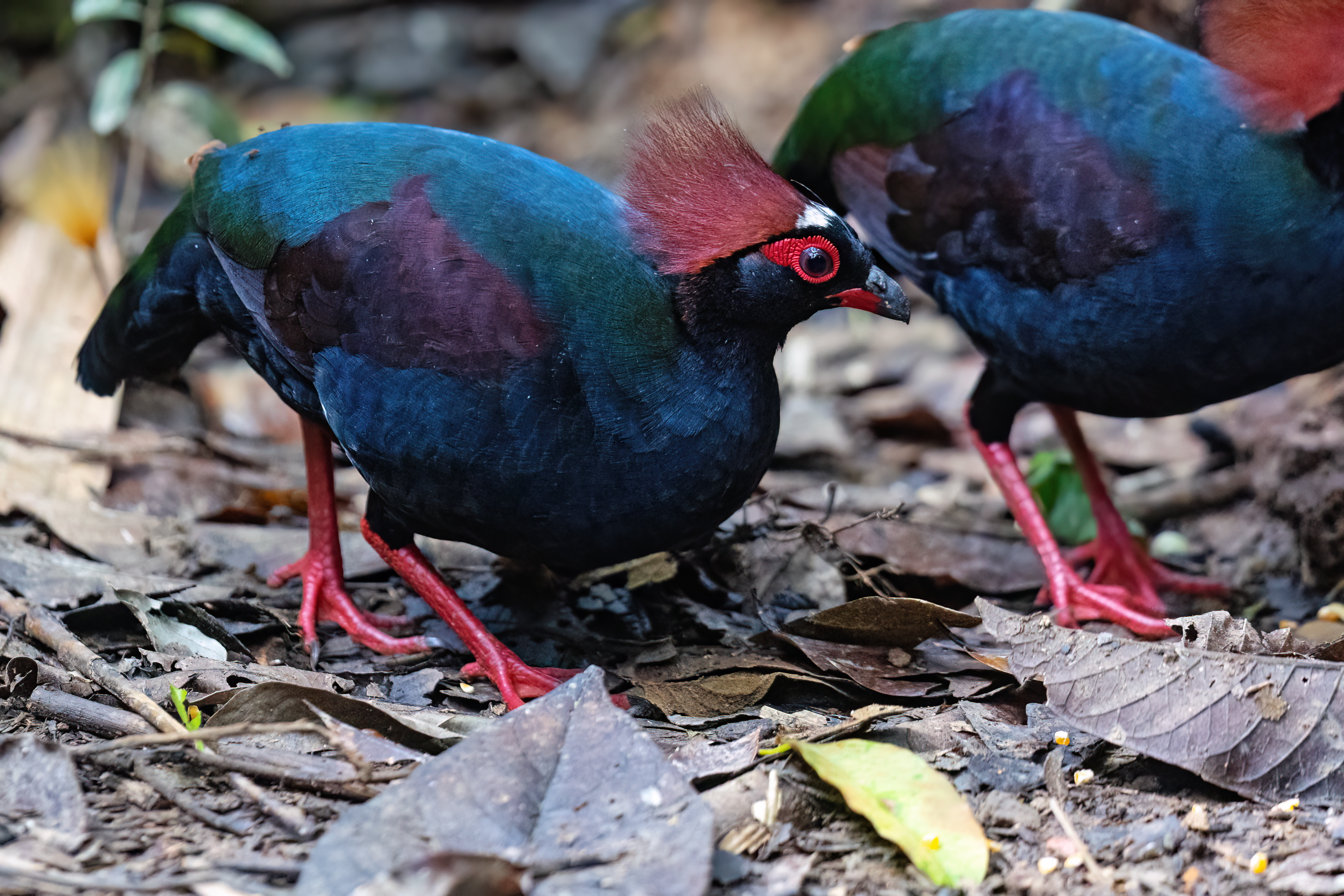
Male, Trusmadi Forest Reserve, Sabah, Borneo

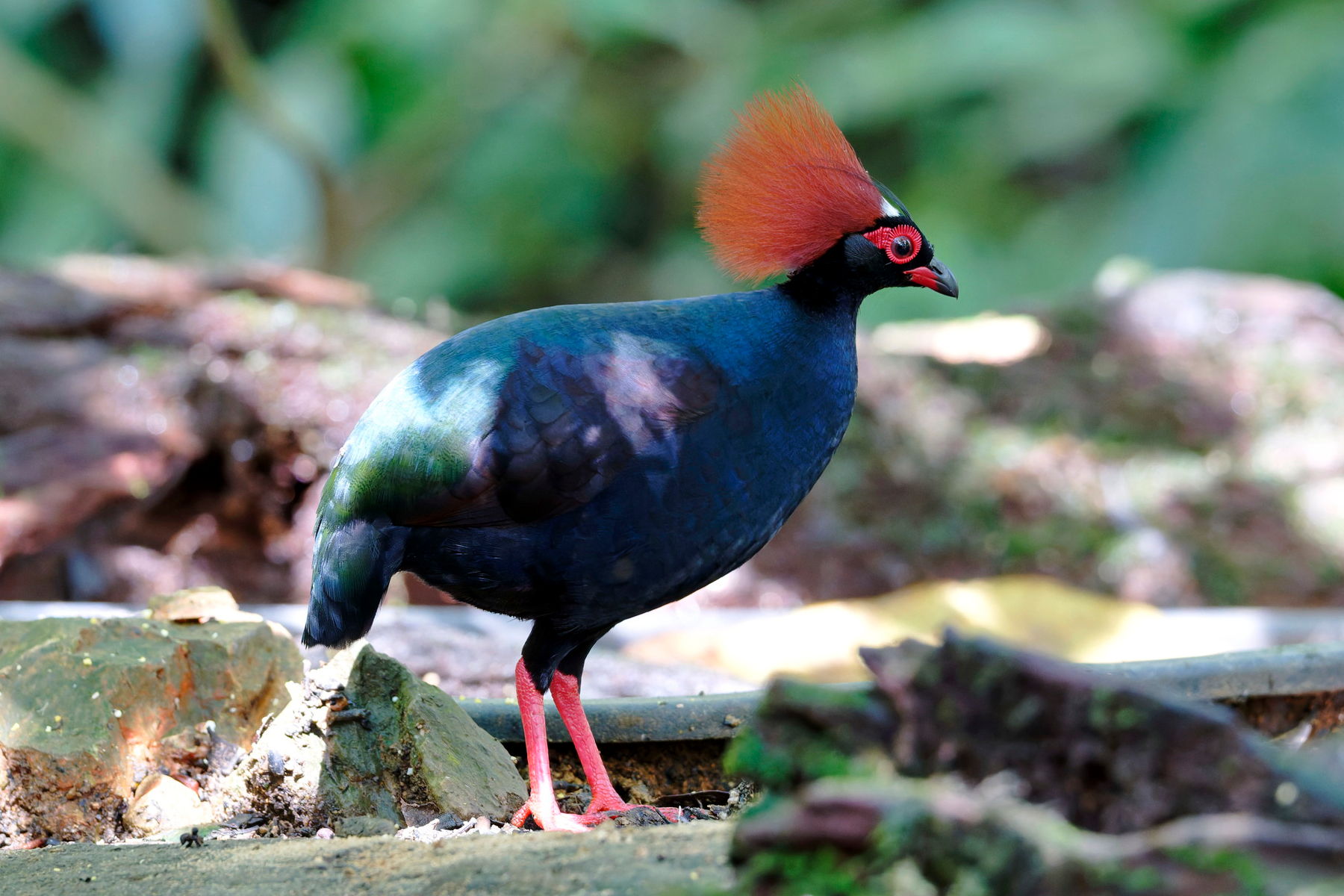
Male at Tambunan, Sabah, Borneo

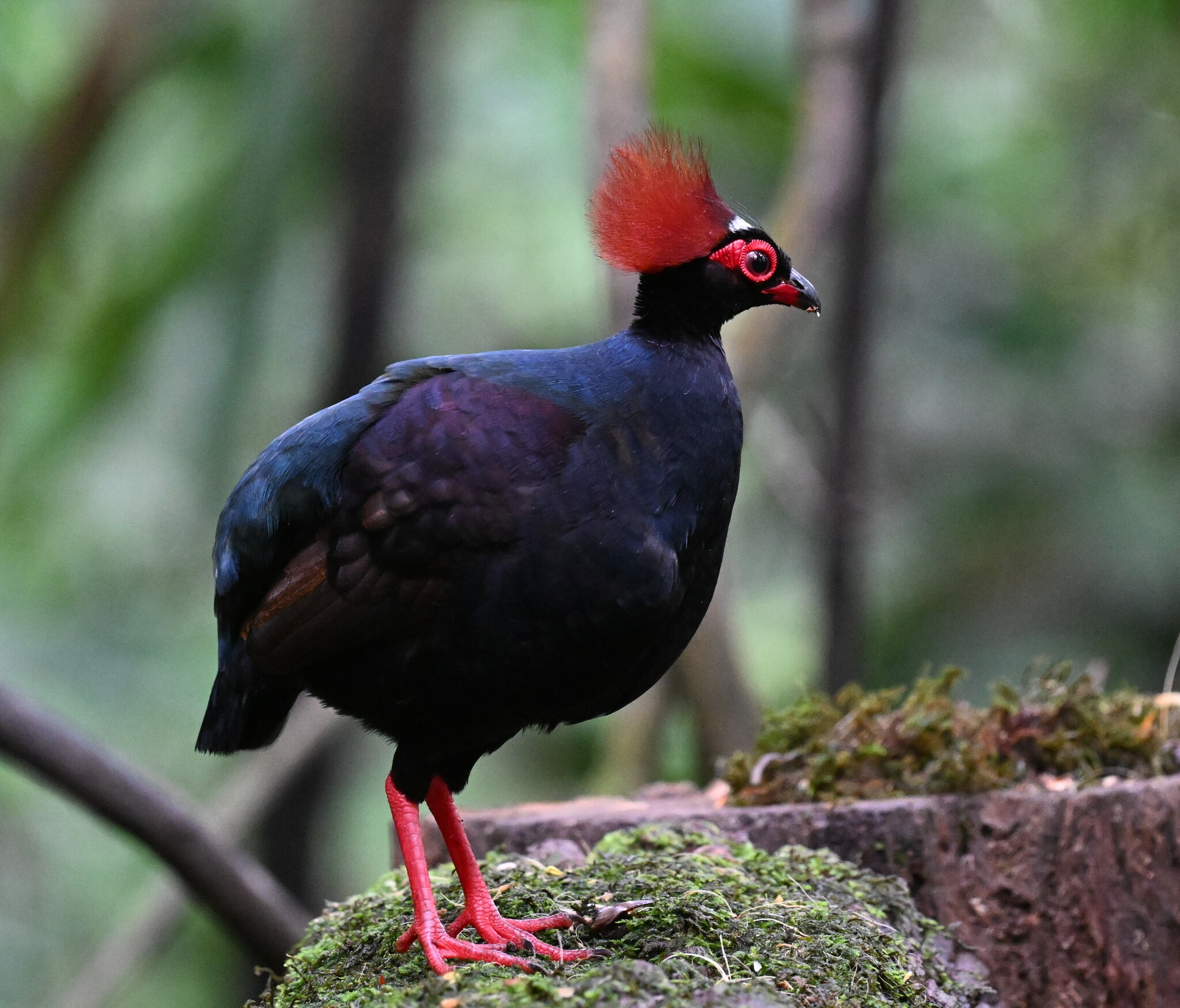
Male at Tambunan, Sabah, Borneo

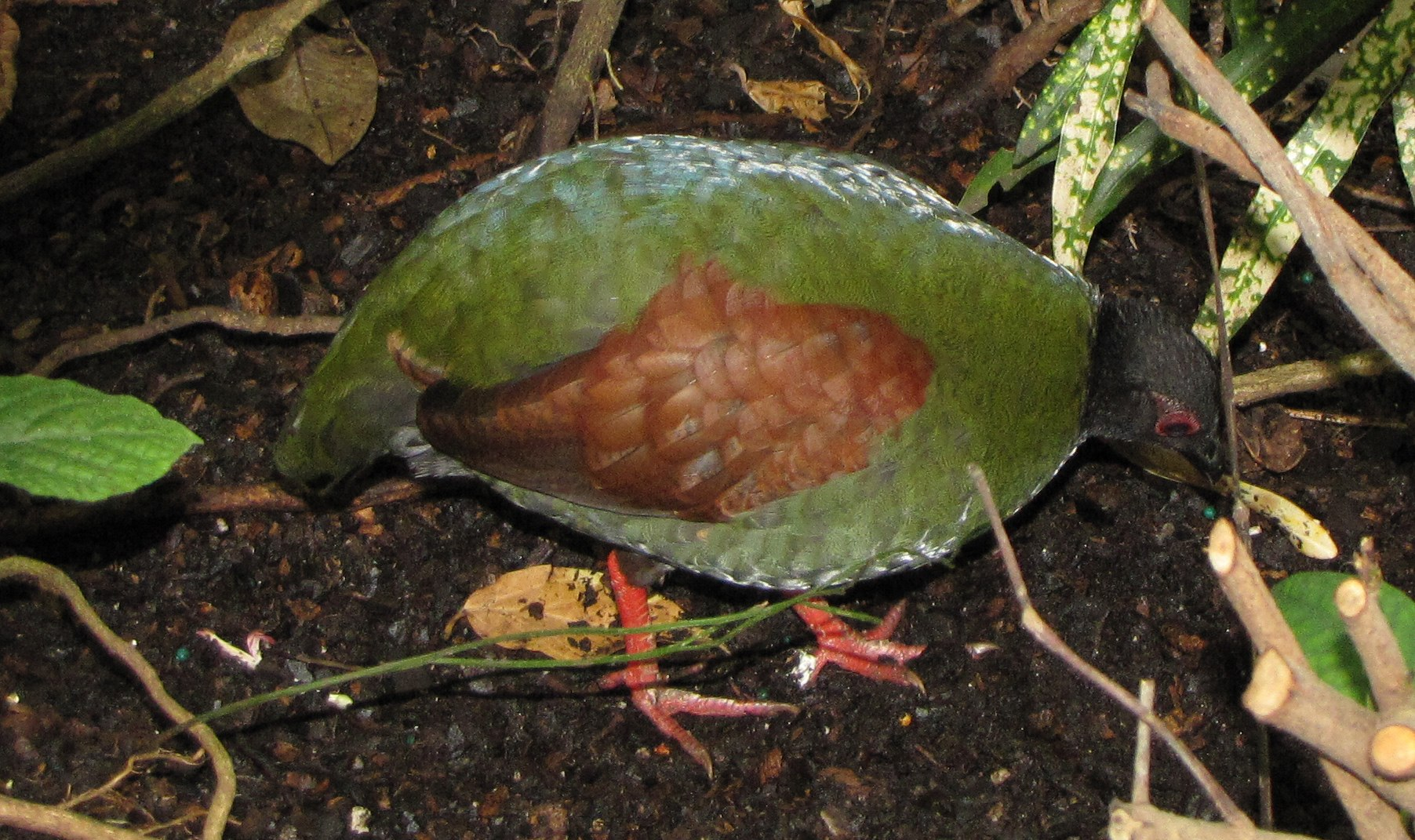
Female at Tennessee Aquarium, Chattanooga, Tennessee, US

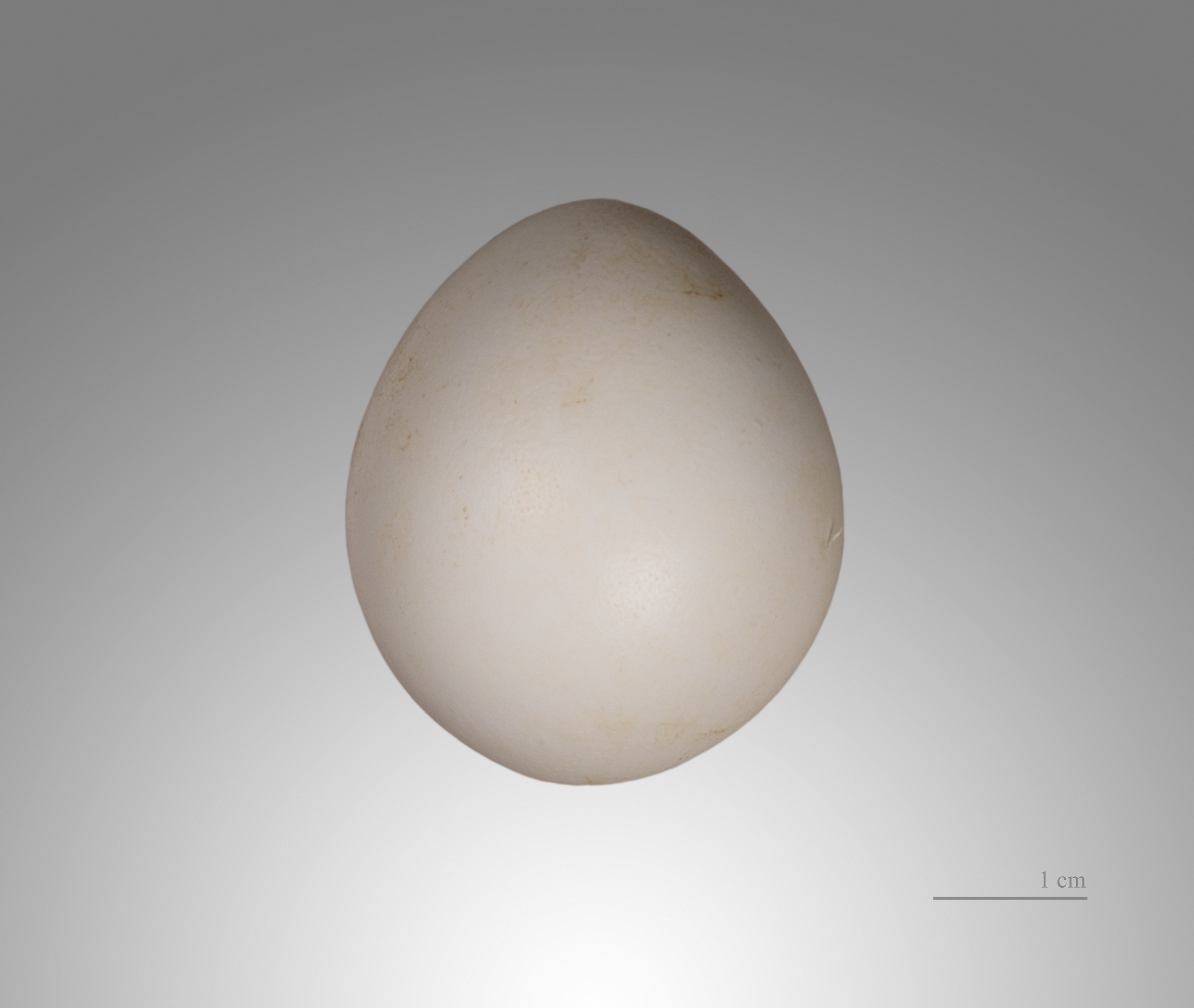
Egg of Rollulus rouloul - MHNT
