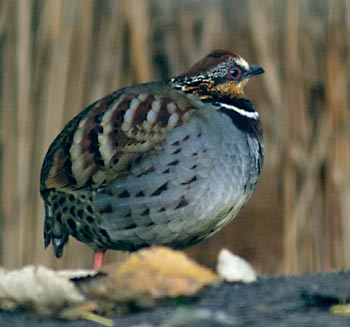
- White-necklaced partridge (Arborophila gingica)

Scientific classification
- Kingdom: Animalia
- Phylum: Chordata
- Class: Aves
- Order: Galliformes
- Family: Phasianidae
- Subfamily: Rollulinae
- Genus: Arborophila; Hodgson, 1837

Type species
- Perdix torquela (hill partridge) Valenciennes, 1825

Species
- About 20, see text

= Arborophila =

Genus of birds

Arborophila is a bird genus in the family Phasianidae. The genus has the second most members within the Galliformes after Pternistis, although Arborophila species vary very little in bodily proportions with different species varying only in colouration/patterning and overall size. These are fairly small, often brightly marked partridges found in forest of eastern and southern Asia. Some species in this genus have small ranges, and are threatened by habitat loss and hunting.

== Taxonomy ==
The genus Arborophila was introduced in 1837 by the English naturalist Brian Houghton Hodgson to accommodate a single species, the hill partridge, which is therefore the type species. The genus name combines the Latin arbor, arboris meaning "tree" with the Ancient Greek philos meaning "-loving".

== Species ==
While most species in this genus are highly distinctive and their taxonomic treatment is settled, there are three complexes where the species limits have not been entirely resolved and to various degrees are disputed: A. orientalis–sumatrana–campbelli–rolli complex, A. cambodiana complex, and A. chloropus–merlini–charltonii complex. A. torqueola is always called the hill partridge or common hill-partridge, but in all other species "hill" is often disregarded (for example, A. rufipectus is variously known as the Sichuan hill-partridge or Sichuan partridge). The genus contains 18 species.

Image	Common name	Scientific name	Distribution
	Hill partridge	Arborophila torqueola	India, Nepal, Bhutan, Tibet, Myanmar, Thailand and Vietnam.
	Sichuan partridge	Arborophila rufipectus	China
	Chestnut-breasted partridge	Arborophila mandellii	Bhutan, Darjeeling, Sikkim, Arunachal Pradesh and south-eastern Tibet
	White-necklaced or collared partridge	Arborophila gingica	China (Zhejiang, Jiangxi, Fujian, Guangdong and Guangxi.)
	Rufous-throated partridge	Arborophila rufogularis	Bangladesh, Bhutan, China, India, Laos, Myanmar, Nepal, Thailand, and Vietnam
	Red-billed partridge	Arborophila rubrirostris	Sumatra, Indonesia.
	Chestnut-headed partridge	Arborophila cambodiana	Cambodia.
	Hainan partridge	Arborophila ardens	Hainan Island, China.
	Taiwan partridge	Arborophila crudigularis	Taiwan
	White-cheeked partridge	Arborophila atrogularis	India, northern Myanmar, and northeast Bangladesh
	Bar-backed partridge	Arborophila brunneopectus	Cambodia, China, Laos, Myanmar, Thailand, and Vietnam
	Orange-necked partridge	Arborophila davidi	Cambodia
	Red-breasted or Bornean partridge	Arborophila hyperythra	Borneo
	Malaysian partridge	Arborophila campbelli	Peninsular Malaysia.
	Roll's partridge	Arborophila rolli	Sumatra, Indonesia.
	Sumatran partridge	Arborophila sumatrana	Sumatra, Indonesia.
	Chestnut-bellied partridge	Arborophila javanica	Java.
	Grey-breasted or white-faced partridge	Arborophila orientalis	eastern Java, Indonesia.
