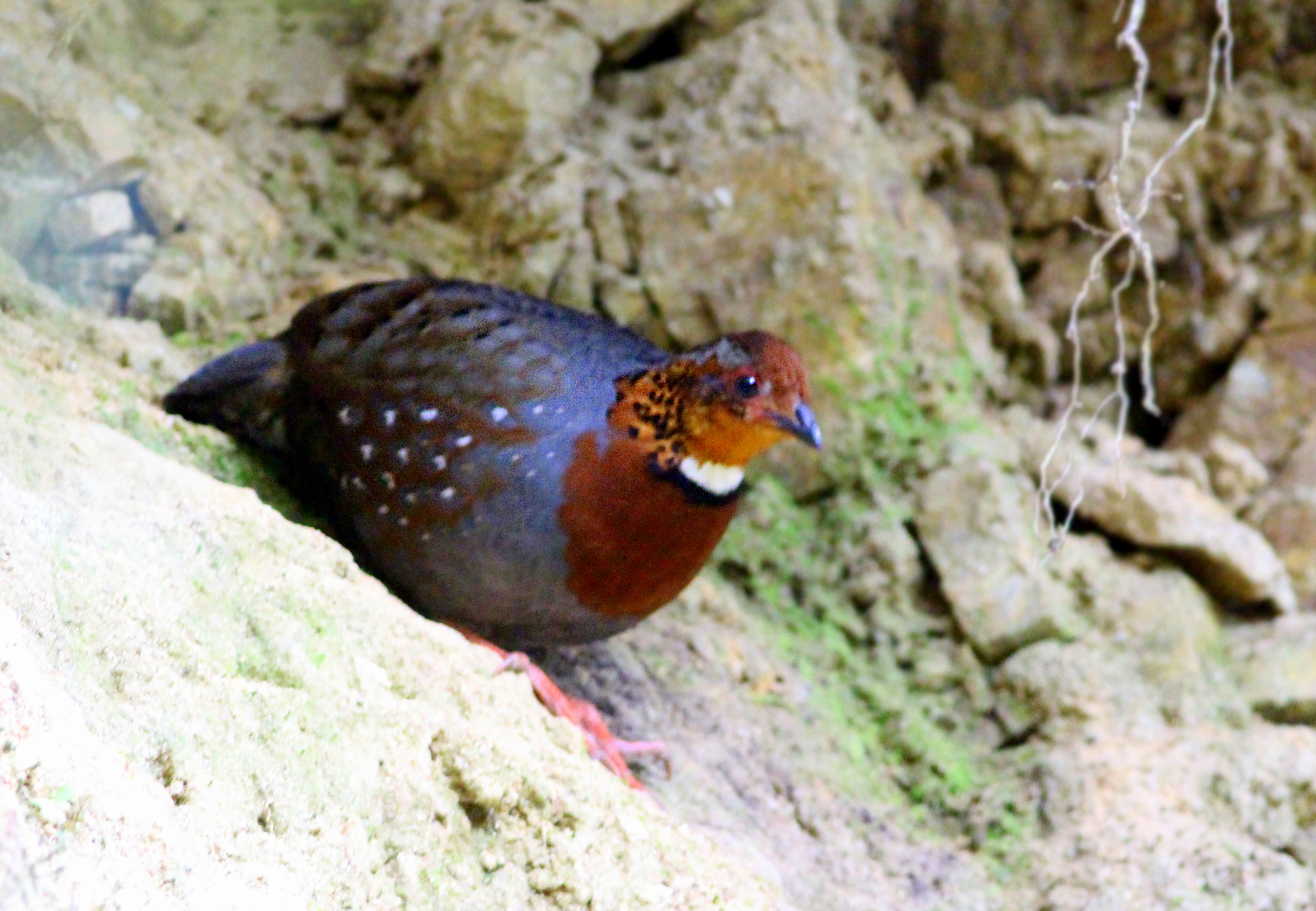
- In Darjeeling district of West Bengal, India

Conservation status
- Near Threatened (IUCN 3.1)

Scientific classification
- Kingdom: Animalia
- Phylum: Chordata
- Class: Aves
- Order: Galliformes
- Family: Phasianidae
- Genus: Arborophila
- Species: A. mandellii

Binomial name
- Arborophila mandellii Hume, 1874

Audio
- Song of chestnut breasted partridge - Arborophila mandellii

= Chestnut-breasted partridge =

Species of bird

The chestnut-breasted partridge (Arborophila mandellii) is a partridge species endemic to the eastern Himalayas north of the Brahmaputra, and occurs in Bhutan, Darjeeling, Sikkim, Arunachal Pradesh and south-eastern Tibet at elevations from 350 to 2,500 m (1,150 to 8,200 ft). It is listed as near threatened on the IUCN Red List, as the estimated population comprises less than 10,000 individuals. It is threatened by forest degradation and by hunting. It is known from at least three protected areas, including Singalila National Park and Namdapha National Park. The scientific name commemorates the Italian naturalist Louis Mandelli.

It is a distinctive partridge with chestnut breast-band and grey belly. It is distinguished from the similar rufous-throated partridge A. rufogularis by more rufescent crown and head-sides, white gorget and entirely chestnut upper breast.

In 2015, the first photograph of this species in the wild was taken in Arunachal Pradesh.
