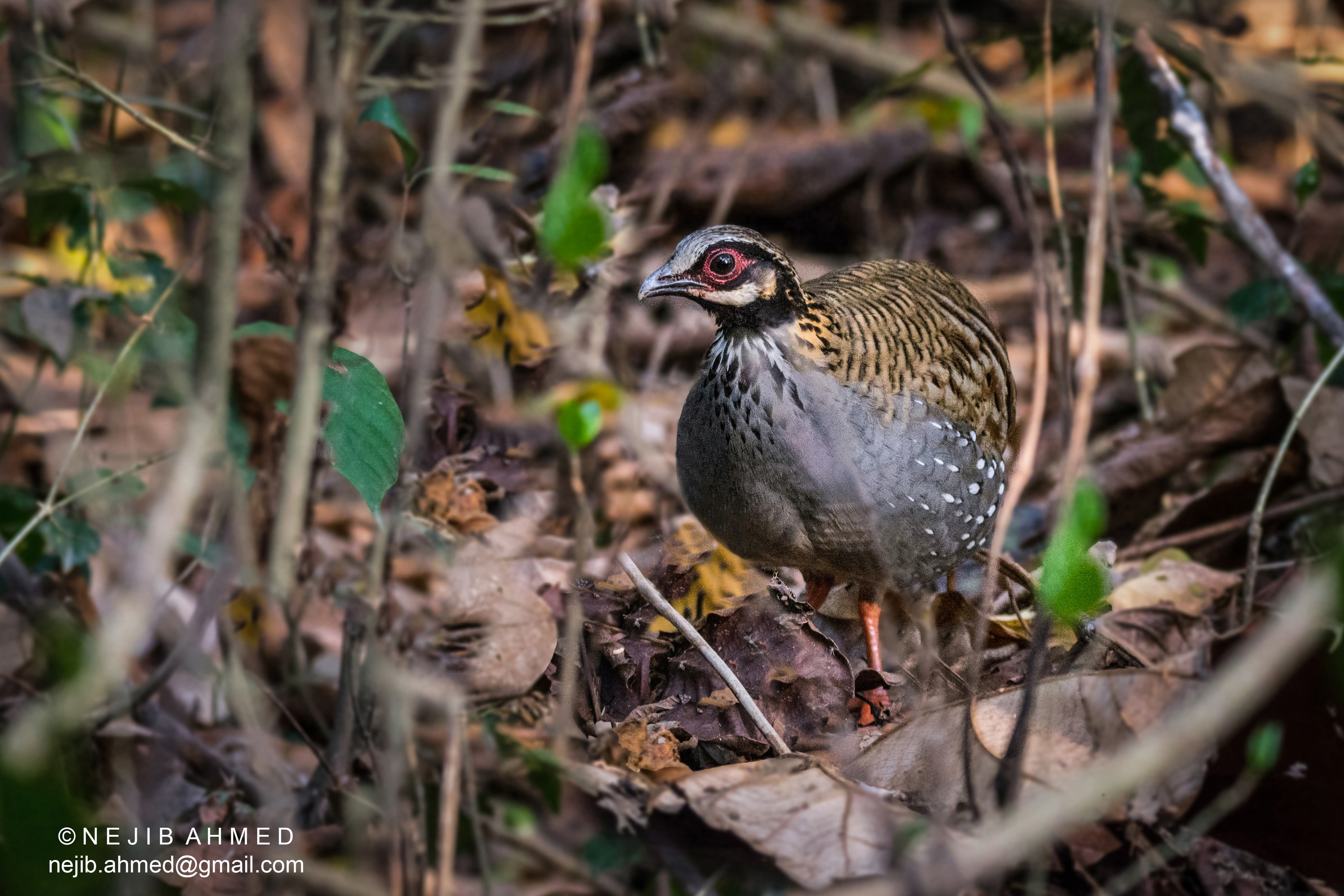
- Illustration from The Gamebirds of India, Burmah and Ceylon (Hume & Marshall, 1880

Conservation status
- Least Concern (IUCN 3.1)

Scientific classification
- Kingdom: Animalia
- Phylum: Chordata
- Class: Aves
- Order: Galliformes
- Family: Phasianidae
- Genus: Arborophila
- Species: A. atrogularis

Binomial name
- Arborophila atrogularis (Blyth, 1849)

= White-cheeked partridge =

Species of bird

The white-cheeked partridge (Arborophila atrogularis) is a species of partridge in the family Phasianidae, native to Asia.

== Distribution and habitat ==
It is found mainly in Northeast India, northern Myanmar, and northeast Bangladesh, inhabiting dense undergrowth in primary and secondary evergreen forest; this sometimes includes adjacent areas of scrub, bamboo, grassland and cultivated land. In India, the species occurs generally at altitudes below 750 m, but may be found at up to 1,220 m in South-East Asia.

== Conservation ==
The white-cheeked partridge is currently classified as Least Concern by the IUCN. Population numbers are unknown and believed to be decreasing, but not at a rate fast enough to warrant a Near Threatened status. It is threatened habitat loss and hunting.
