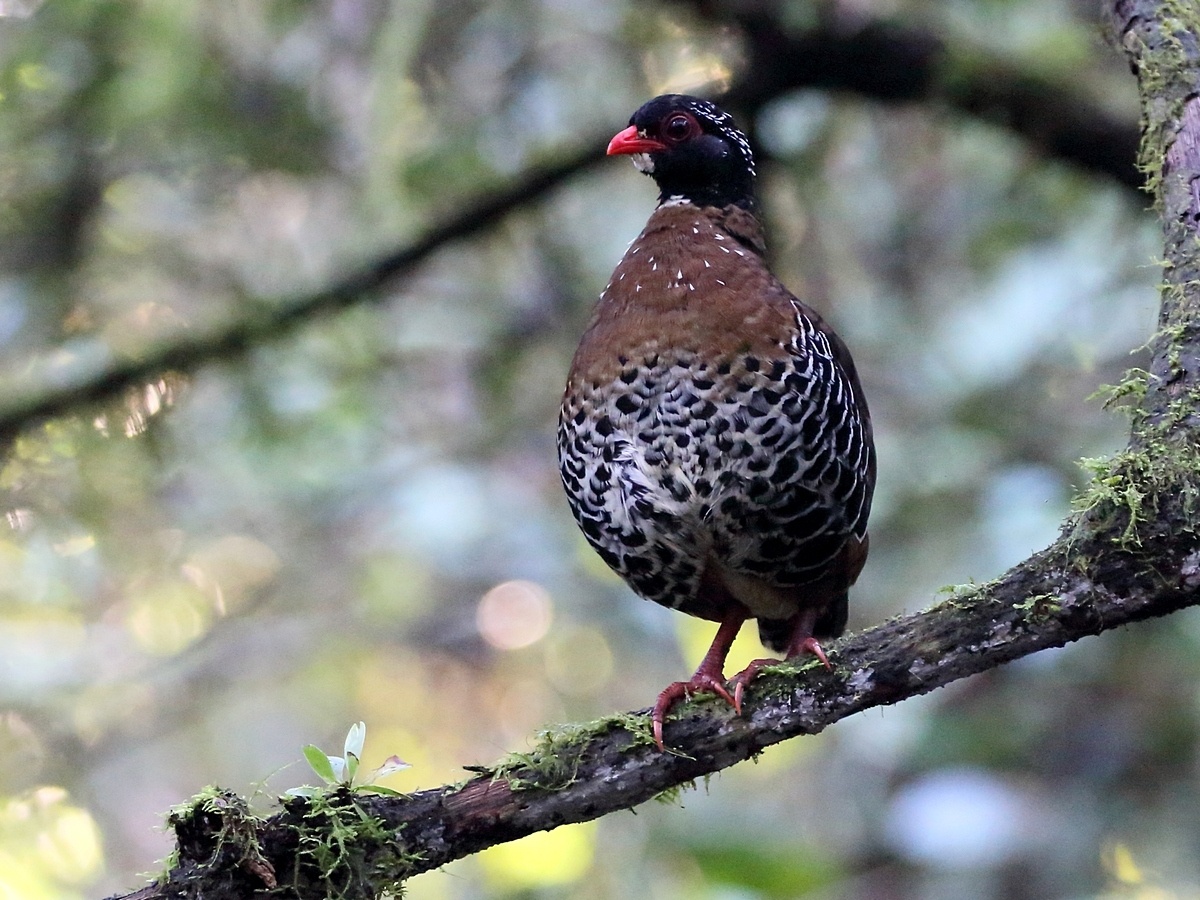
- A. rubrirostris in Jambi, Indonesia

Conservation status
- Least Concern (IUCN 3.1)

Scientific classification
- Kingdom: Animalia
- Phylum: Chordata
- Class: Aves
- Order: Galliformes
- Family: Phasianidae
- Genus: Arborophila
- Species: A. rubrirostris

Binomial name
- Arborophila rubrirostris (Salvadori, 1879)

= Red-billed partridge =

Species of bird

The red-billed partridge (Arborophila rubrirostris) is a bird species in the family Phasianidae. It is endemic to the Barisan highland forest in Sumatra, Indonesia. It is the only member of the genus Arborophila where the bill is completely red. Other members of the genus have either a yellow-tipped red bill or a black bill.
