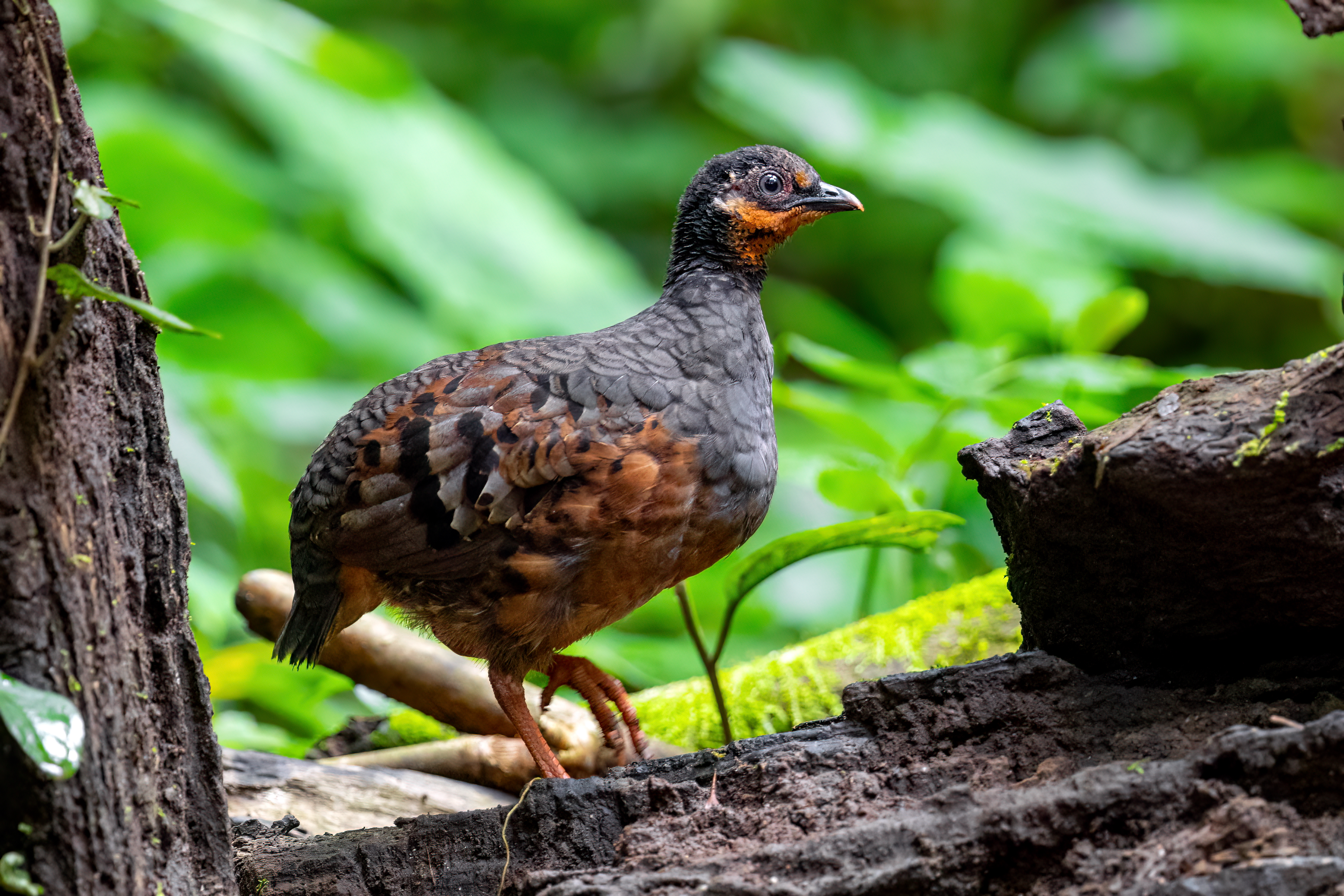
- In East Java, Indonesia

Conservation status
- Least Concern (IUCN 3.1)

Scientific classification
- Kingdom: Animalia
- Phylum: Chordata
- Class: Aves
- Order: Galliformes
- Family: Phasianidae
- Genus: Arborophila
- Species: A. javanica

Binomial name
- Arborophila javanica (Gmelin, JF, 1789)

= Chestnut-bellied partridge =

Species of bird

The chestnut-bellied partridge (Arborophila javanica) also known as chestnut-bellied hill-partridge or Javan hill-partridge is a small, up to 28 cm long, partridge with a rufous crown and nape, red legs, grey breast, brown wings, red facial skin, and a black mask, throat and bill. It has a rufous belly with white on the middle. The sexes are similar. The young has a whitish face and a reddish brown bill.

An Indonesian endemic, the chestnut-bellied partridge is distributed to hill and mountain forests of west and east Java. The female lays up to four eggs in a domed nest of long grasses, built by the male.

A common species in its limited range, the chestnut-bellied partridge is evaluated as Least Concern on the IUCN Red List of Threatened Species.

== Taxonomy ==
The chestnut-bellied partridge was formally described in 1789 by the German naturalist Johann Friedrich Gmelin in his revised and expanded edition of Carl Linnaeus's Systema Naturae. He placed it with all the grouse like birds in the genus Tetrao and coined the binomial name Tetrao javanicus. Gmelin based his description on the "Javan partridge" that had been described and illustrated in 1776 by the English naturalist Peter Brown. The chestnut-bellied partridge is now one of around twenty species placed in the genus Arborophila that was introduced in 1837 by the English naturalist Brian Houghton Hodgson. The genus name combines the Latin arbor, arboris meaning "tree" with the Ancient Greek philos meaning "-loving".

Two subspecies of chestnut-bellied partridge are recognized:

- A. j. javanica (Gmelin J.F., 1789) – montane Java
- A. j. lawuana (Bartels M., 1938) – montane east-central Java
