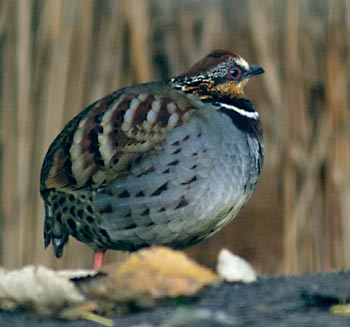

Conservation status
- Near Threatened (IUCN 3.1)

Scientific classification
- Kingdom: Animalia
- Phylum: Chordata
- Class: Aves
- Order: Galliformes
- Family: Phasianidae
- Genus: Arborophila
- Species: A. gingica

Binomial name
- Arborophila gingica (Gmelin, 1789)

Synonyms
- Tetrao gingicus (protonym)

= White-necklaced partridge =

Species of bird

The white-necklaced partridge (Arborophila gingica), also known as the collared partridge or Rickett's hill-partridge, is a species of bird in the family Phasianidae. It is endemic to southeastern China. It is threatened by habitat loss and hunting, and the IUCN has assessed it as near-threatened.

== Taxonomy ==
The white-necklaced partridge was formally described in 1789 by the German naturalist Johann Friedrich Gmelin in his revised and expanded edition of Carl Linnaeus's Systema Naturae. He placed it with the other partridge like birds in the genus Tetrao and coined the binomial name Tetrao gingicus. Gmelin based his description "La perdrix de Gingi" that had been described by the French naturalist Pierre Sonnerat's in 1782 in his Voyage aux Indes orientales et a la Chine. Gmelin specified the type locality as "Gingi in Coromandel". This is an error, the species is found in southeast China. The white-necklaced partridge is now one of around twenty species placed in the genus Arborophila that was introduced in 1837 by Brian Houghton Hodgson. The genus name combines the Latin arbor, arboris meaning "tree" with the Ancient Greek philos meaning "-loving". The specific epithet gingicus is from the toponym "Gingi".

The white-necklaced partridge has two recognized subspecies:

- A. g. gingica (Gmelin J.F., 1789) - southeastern China
- A. g. guangxiensis (Zhou F., & Jiang A., 2008) – Guangxi (south-central China)

== Description ==
The white-necklaced partridge is 25–30 cm (9.8–11.8 in) long and weighs about 253 g (8.9 oz). The adult's forehead is white (in the nominate subspecies), and there is a long supercilium. The neck-sides and throat are orange-rufous. There are a black gorget and a white band above the chestnut upper chest. The underparts are dark grey, changing to whitish on the belly. The nape and back are reddish-brown, with black spots. The rump is olive-brown and has black spots. The wings range from greyish to buffy-brown. The female is like the male but smaller. The short beak is grey, the eyes are brown, and the legs are red. The juvenile bird has a duller breast.

== Distribution and habitat ==
The white-necklaced partridge is endemic to southeastern China, in Zhejiang, Jiangxi, Fujian, Guangdong and Guangxi. It lives in forests, bamboo and scrub at elevations of 150–1,900 m (490–6,230 ft).

== Behaviour ==
This partridge occurs in the undergrowth during the day and roosts in trees. It eats seeds, berries and insects. The territorial call is a repeated plaintive whistle, including wooop and co-qwee. It mostly calls in the early morning and the evening. It breeds from April to May, laying a clutch of five to seven eggs.

== Status ==
The population size is estimated at 50,000–250,000 mature birds. The species is threatened by habitat loss caused by forest clearing, construction of roads and mining. It is also hunted illegally. Because of these threats, the population is declining. The IUCN previously assessed it as vulnerable, but the species' range was later found to be larger, so it is currently assessed as a near-threatened species. A programme to breed the species in captivity began at Guangzhou in 1986.
