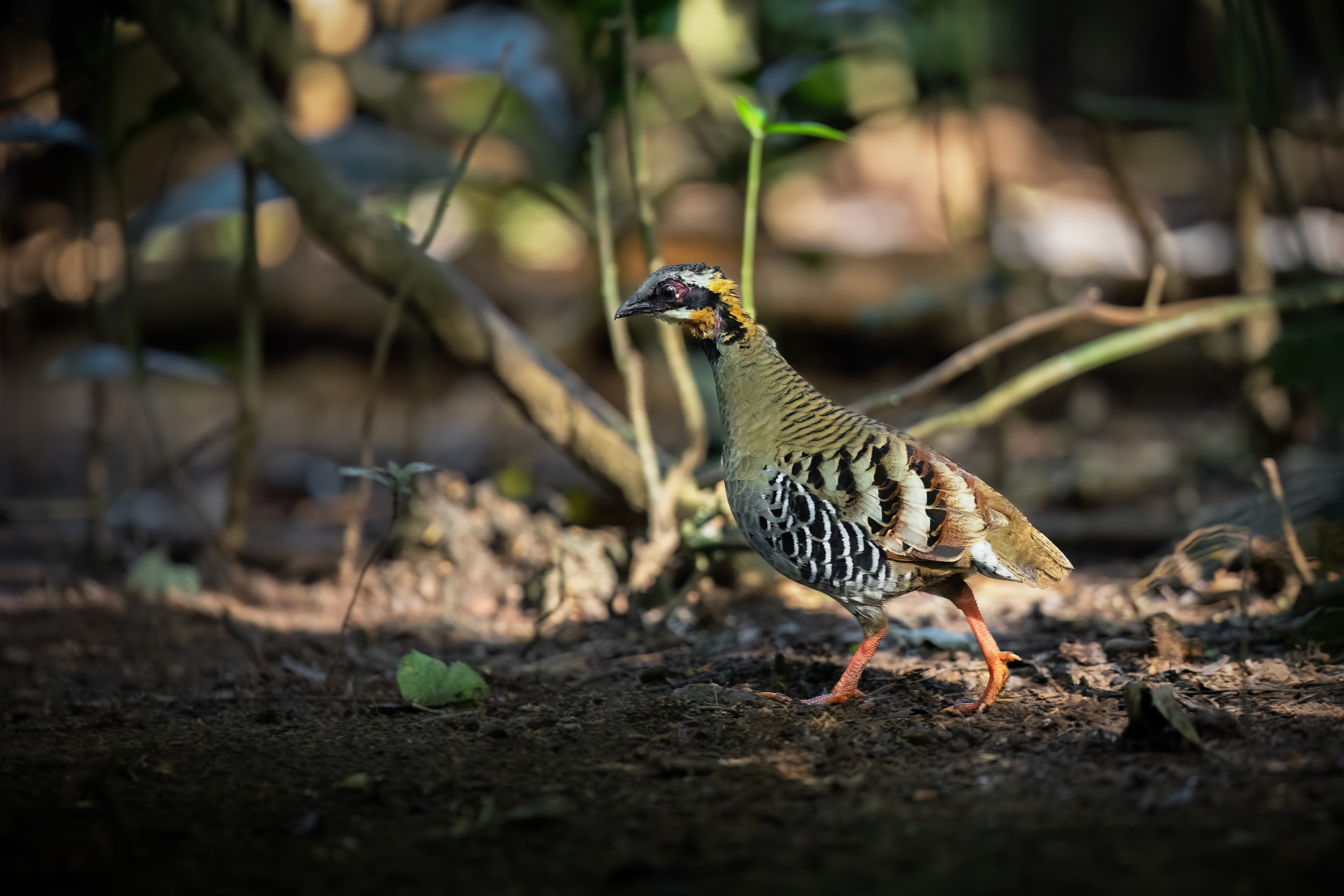

Conservation status
- Near Threatened (IUCN 3.1)

Scientific classification
- Kingdom: Animalia
- Phylum: Chordata
- Class: Aves
- Order: Galliformes
- Family: Phasianidae
- Genus: Arborophila
- Species: A. davidi

Binomial name
- Arborophila davidi Delacour, 1927

= Orange-necked partridge =

Species of bird

The orange-necked partridge (Arborophila davidi) is a species of bird in the family Phasianidae. It is found in eastern Cambodia and southern Vietnam. Its habitats are lowland forests, shrubland, and plantations. It was described in 1927 and rediscovered in 1991. It is threatened by habitat loss, and the International Union for Conservation of Nature (IUCN) has assessed it as a near-threatened species.

== Taxonomy ==
This species was described by Jean Théodore Delacour in 1927. The specific name is derived from André David-Beaulieu, a French colonial administrator who collected the type specimen earlier in 1927. There are no subspecies.

== Description ==
The orange-necked partridge is about 27 cm (11 in) long and weighs about 241 g (8.5 oz). The forehead and crown are dusky, and the nape is mottled brown. A black band extends from the beak to the sides of the neck, and a whitish band extends from the eye to the neck-sides, becoming orange. There is also a black breast-band. The chin is pale buff, and the throat is rusty-orange. The breast is olive-brown, and the belly is greyish and whitish. The flanks have black and white scallops. The back and rump are olive-brown, with dark brown bars. The wing coverts have black and grey bands. The eyes are brown, the beak is black, and the legs are pinkish.

== Distribution and habitat ==
The orange-necked partridge is found in southern Vietnam and a small area in Mondulkiri, Cambodia. It lives in forest in hills at elevations of 120–600 m (390–1,970 ft), preferring bamboos. It also occurs in some disturbed habitats, including scrubs, bamboos and logged plantations. In Vietnam, it occurs in several national parks and state forest enterprises. All of the individuals recorded in a 2005 survey lived less than 2 km (1.2 mi) from water.

== Behaviour ==
Little is known about this partridge's behaviour. The territorial calls are a repeated, accelerating prruu, becoming pwi at higher pitches, and also a series of fast tu notes. In duets, the other bird responds with tchew-tchew-tchew. The alarm call is a pher or phu.

== Status ==
After its discovery in 1927, the orange-necked partridge was "lost" until its 1991 rediscovery in Cát Tiên National Park. Subsequent surveys have found it in several sites in Vietnam, possibly because of improved survey techniques. It was first recorded in Cambodia in 2002, using a camera trap, and later records in Cambodia have all been in the same site. The IUCN assessed it as a critically endangered species, downlisting to endangered in 2000 and to near threatened in 2009. The population is estimated to be nearly 10,000. It is threatened by logging, forest clearance and hunting. The population is declining, but the decline is probably not rapid because the bird seems to tolerate some forest degradation, so it is assessed as near threatened even though its population and range are both small.

In 2000, the orange-necked partridge appeared on a national stamp of Vietnam.
