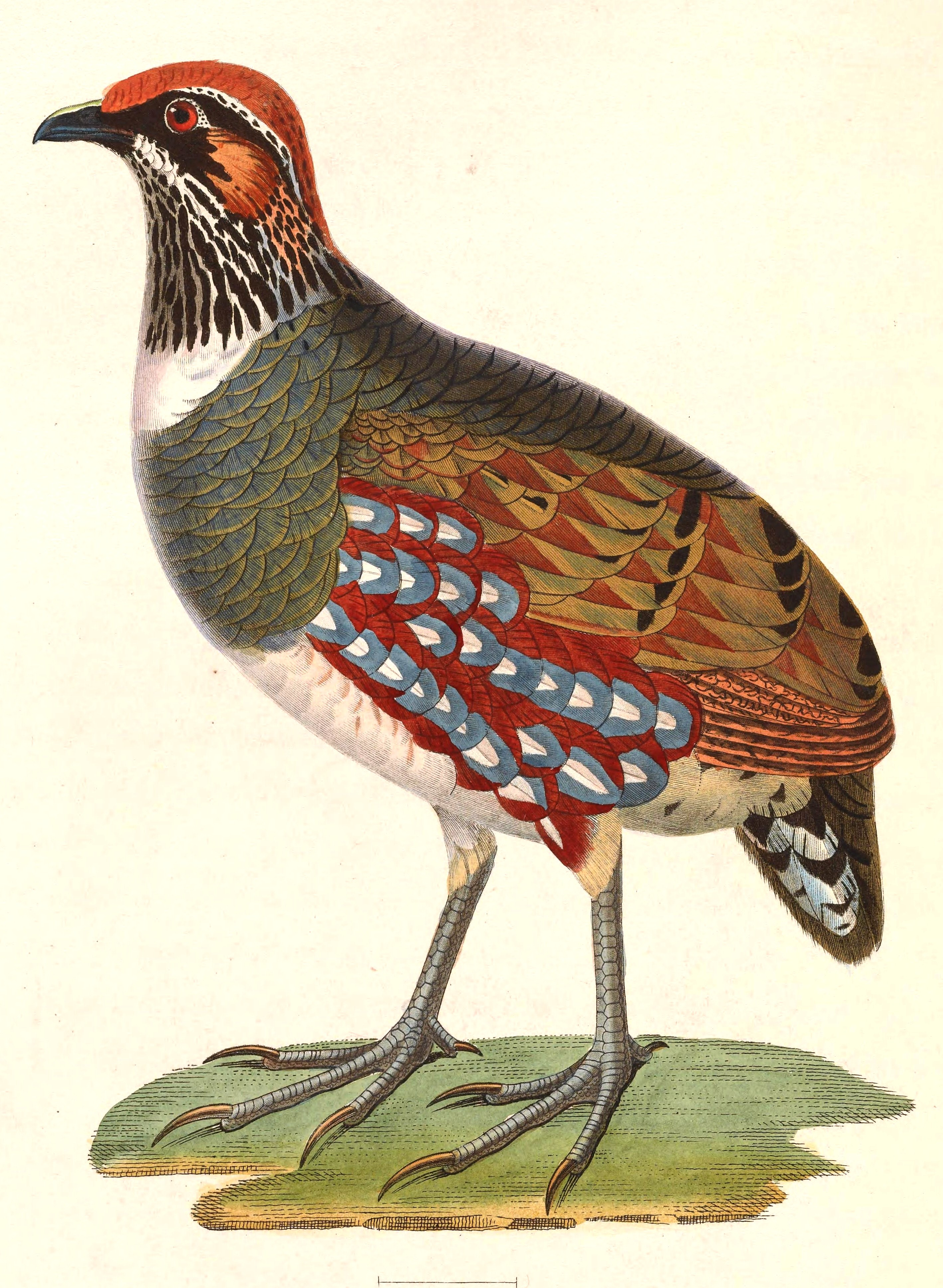
- male

Conservation status
- Least Concern (IUCN 3.1)

Scientific classification
- Kingdom: Animalia
- Phylum: Chordata
- Class: Aves
- Order: Galliformes
- Family: Phasianidae
- Genus: Arborophila
- Species: A. torqueola

Binomial name
- Arborophila torqueola (Valenciennes, 1825)

Audio
- Song of hill partridge

= Hill partridge =

Species of bird

The common hill partridge, necklaced hill partridge, or simply hill partridge (Arborophila torqueola) is a species of bird in the pheasant family found in Asia.

== Description ==
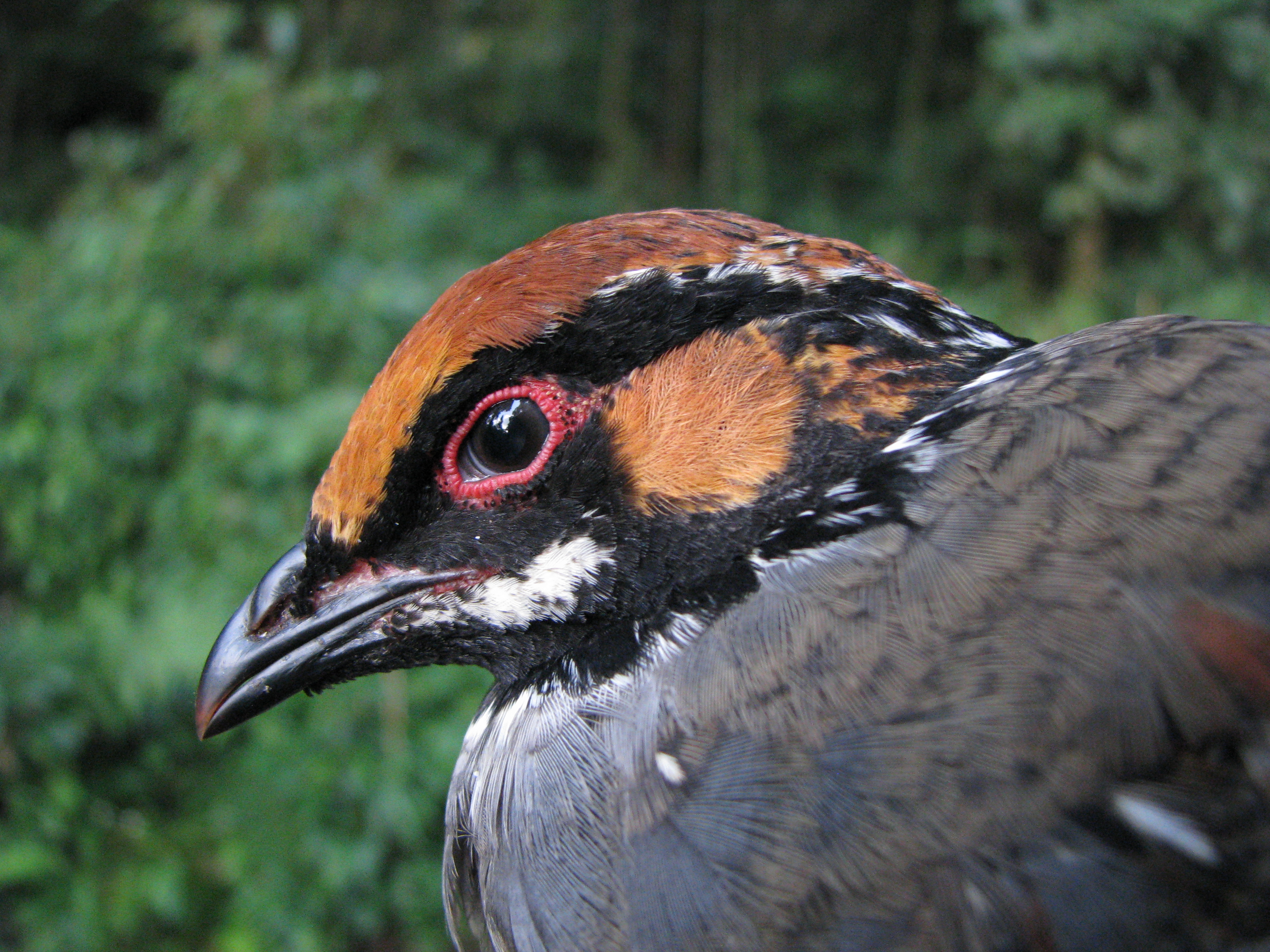
A male from Arunachal Pradesh, India

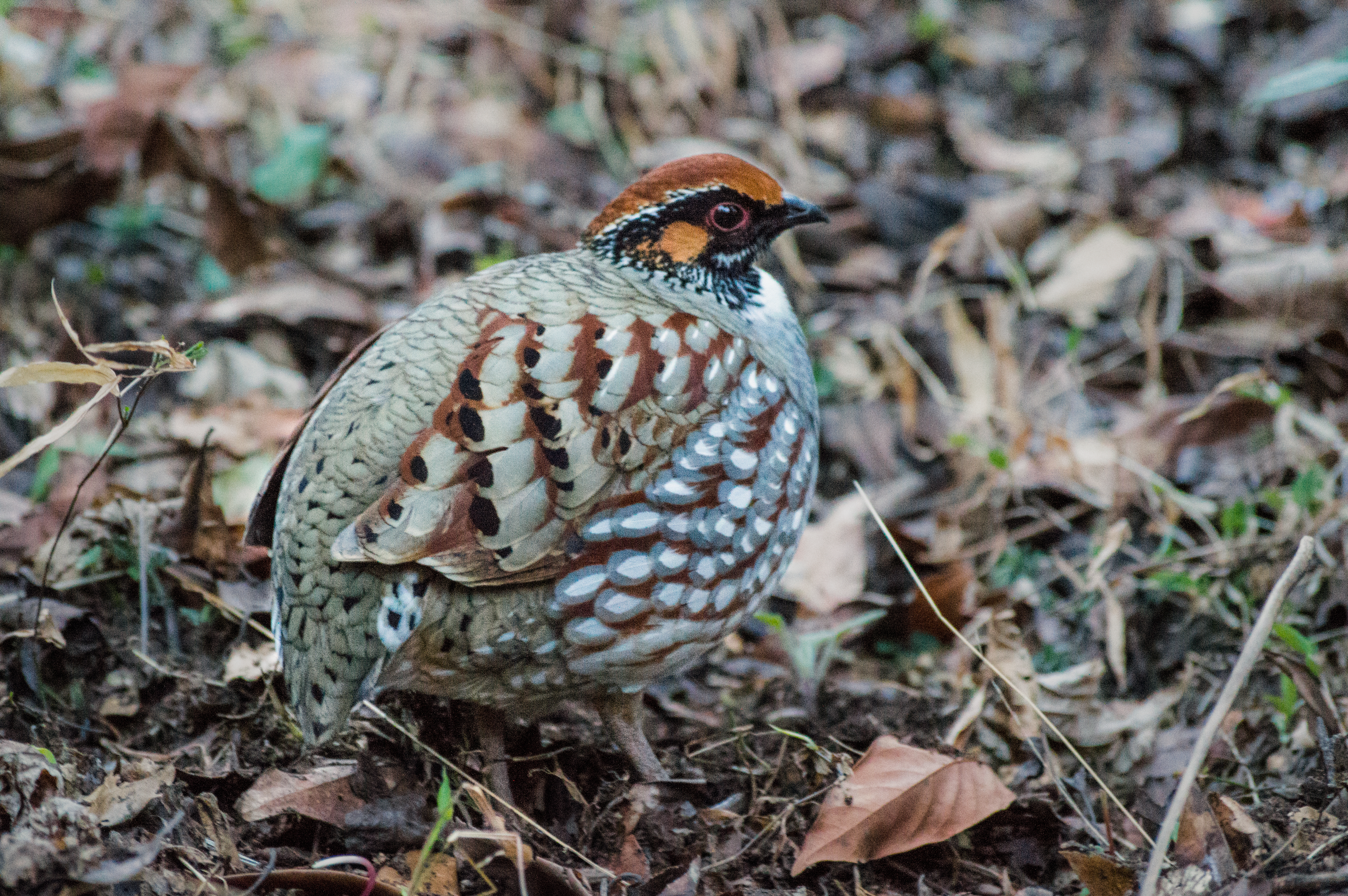
At Deoria Tal

Males of the species have ornate patterns and markings, a combination of an orange crown and face set against a black head and streaked throat. Females lack the distinctive head markings and the grey chest and upper belly of the male, with the flank colouration of white streaked ginger-brown feathers extending further up and across the belly of the hen. Four subspecies have been identified on the basis of differences on the head markings on the male. The length of this species is roughly 27–30 cm (11–12 in) and weight can vary between 230 g (8 oz) for a small female to 390 g (14 oz) for a large fat male.

== Behaviour ==
Common hill-partridges are mostly seen in pairs or small coveys of up to 10 individuals that may be made up of family groups.

=== Breeding ===
Indian populations of common hill-partridges breed between April and June, although earlier breeding has been recorded at lower altitudes. The average clutch size is 3-5 eggs but up to nine eggs have also been observed (in captivity, clutches of greater than 3 eggs are essentially unknown). Eggs are white, incubation times are unrecorded in wild birds but are reported to be 24 days for captive birds. The nest is a ball of whatever manageable materials are within a few feet of the nest site with a lined shallow scrape at the centre to form the cup of the nest. In captivity the structure is generally unstable unless supported, typically within low-growing vegetation or roots.

=== Feeding ===
The food of the common hill-partridge comprises seeds and various invertebrates, which it collects by scratching in leaf litter. It has a hen-like contact call that is constantly uttered when it is feeding.

== Distribution and habitat ==
The common hill-partridge range spans over a narrow band from the western Himalayas to north Vietnam. It is found in India, Nepal, Bhutan, Tibet, Myanmar, Thailand and Vietnam. Its natural habitats are subtropical or tropical moist lowland forest and subtropical or tropical moist montane forest. The species is not globally threatened and is common in most parts of its range.

== Subspecies ==
The hill partridge has five recognized subspecies:

- Arborophila torqueola millardi (Baker, ECS, 1921)
- Arborophila torqueola torqueola (Valenciennes, 1825)
- Arborophila torqueola interstincta (Ripley 1951)
- Arborophila torqueola batemani (Ogilvie-Grant, 1906)
- Arborophila torqueola griseata (Delacour & Jabouille, 1930)
