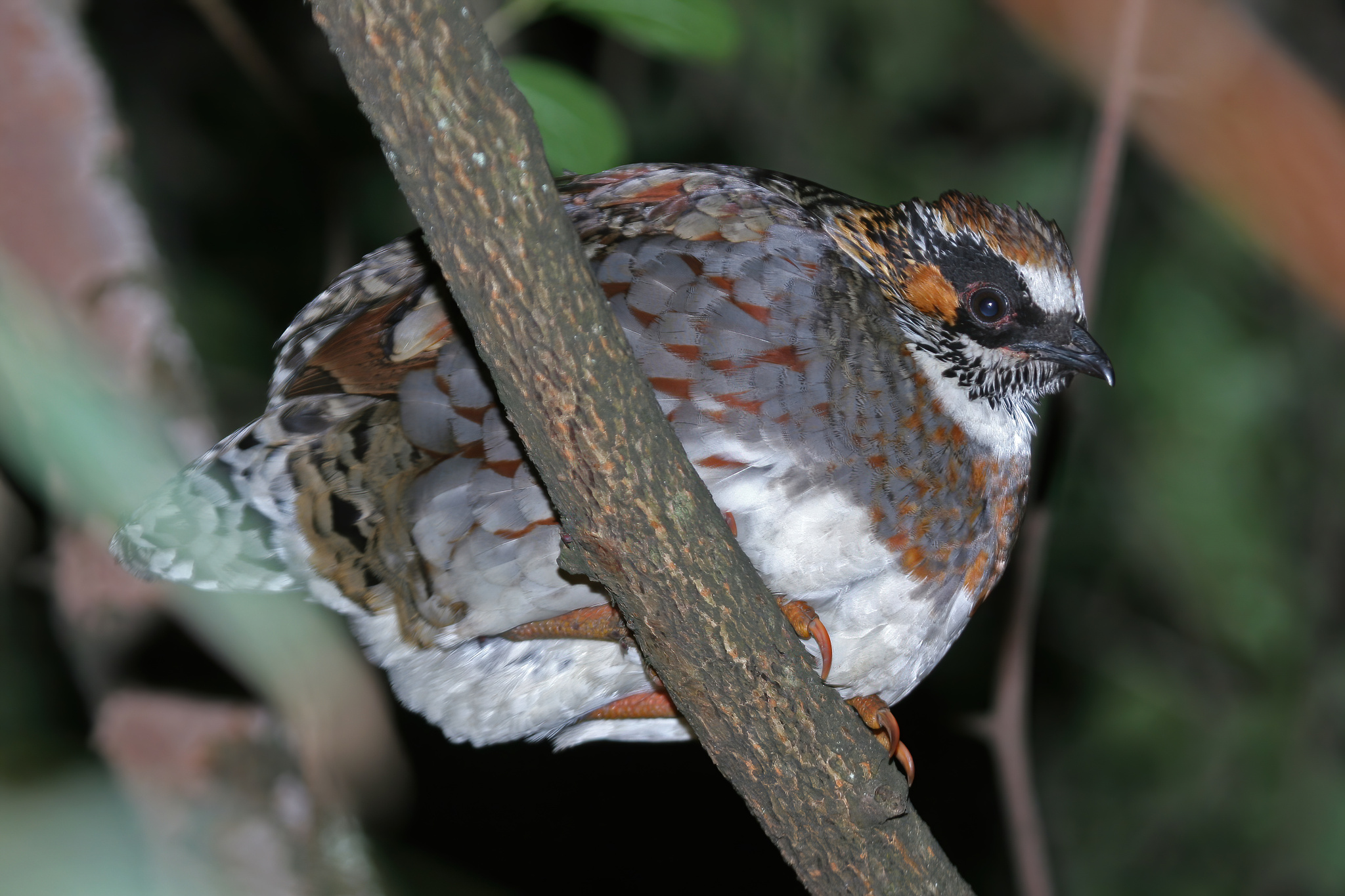

Conservation status
- Vulnerable (IUCN 3.1)

Scientific classification
- Kingdom: Animalia
- Phylum: Chordata
- Class: Aves
- Order: Galliformes
- Family: Phasianidae
- Genus: Arborophila
- Species: A. rufipectus

Binomial name
- Arborophila rufipectus Boulton, 1932

= Sichuan partridge =

Species of bird

The Sichuan partridge (Arborophila rufipectus) is a bird species in the family Phasianidae. It is found only in China where it is classified as a nationally protected animal. Its natural habitat is temperate forest. It is threatened by habitat loss.

== Taxonomy ==
There is still little known about the species' genome, but it is distantly related to the turkey. It is thought that it branched away from other genera with Phasianidae 39 million years ago, which is much earlier than others within the family.

== Behaviour ==
=== Breeding ===
Males are territorial and monogamous. Males will stay away from the females before mating and during the incubation period. At all other times, males will roost alongside the females. While females are brooding on the ground, the males will sit near the ground for two weeks and then leave to roost elsewhere. The breeding season is late March while the hatching season is mid-May through mid-July. Once paired, males will guard females 24 hours a day. When it comes to the general breeding and habitat locations for the partridge, it prefers more local areas far from direct disturbances from human contact. Males have three types of one-syllable call, which are a crowing call, courtship call, and preserving territory call. The syllable duration is significantly different between calls, but the difference of main peak frequency was not significantly different. The vocal behaviors will benefit to preserve mates and avoid the predator pressure so the population could last longer.

== Distribution and habitat ==
The Sichuan partridge lives mostly in southern Sichuan Province, in southwest China. It is also found in northern Yunnan, including Laojun Mountain. It prefers primary and older planted secondary broadleaf forest, rather than one with human activity close by. Prefers a dense canopy and more open understory. The major habitats (in ranking order) are Primary Broadleaf Forest, old replanted Broadleaf Forest, Degraded Forest, and scrub. It prefers thick shrubs for roosting.

Recent work on the species in Laojunshan Nature Reserve found that the species occurred in secondary broadleaf forest but not in settlements, coniferous plantations or farmland. The same study found that birds typically occurred between 1400 and 1800m above sea level in the reserve, and mostly on gently sloping ground close to water sources.

== Status and conservation ==
The Sichuan partridge is listed as Vulnerable on the IUCN Red List. Before 1998 there was no ban on logging, and Chinese forestry authorities paid little to no attention to the ecosystems and habitats these broadleaf forest partridges are often living in. Most of their habitat was divided in forest farms. With a decrease in Sichuan partridge's habitat the population of the species greatly became at risk. This was until the National Forest Protection Programme was enacted, where deforestation became prohibited in this region especially stopping of deforestation in upper Yangtze. This has halted the threat temporarily, but other factors including traditions of livestock browsing, bamboo shoot and medicinal plant collection all affect the habitat of this species. Hunting is another large problem for the decrease of these partridges. The long-term survival is unknown.

Conservation plans are hindered by the lack of knowledge of the need for these birds. According to this study, the Sichuan partridge shows no real preference between a primary broadleaf and a replant broadleaf forest. The planted broadleaf forest have about five dominant tree species and within only 15-20 years the planted resembles a primary forest. This can result in a larger habitat for this species of partridge. These new reserves, which have been protected since 1998, are thought to allow a stable population of the Sichuan partridge.
