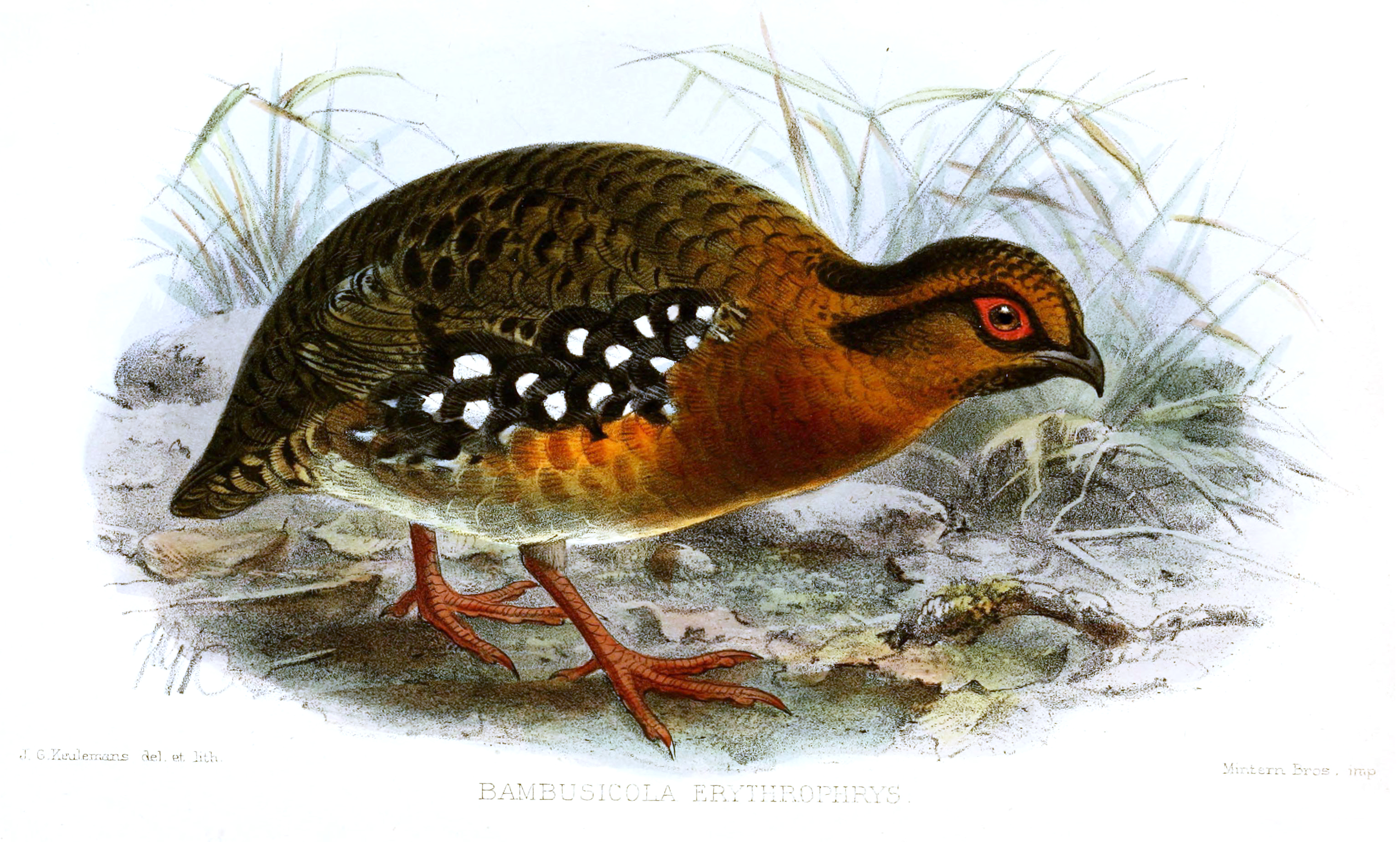

Conservation status
- Least Concern (IUCN 3.1)

Scientific classification
- Kingdom: Animalia
- Phylum: Chordata
- Class: Aves
- Order: Galliformes
- Family: Phasianidae
- Genus: Arborophila
- Species: A. hyperythra

Binomial name
- Arborophila hyperythra (Sharpe, 1879)

= Red-breasted partridge =

Species of bird

The red-breasted partridge (Arborophila hyperythra), also known as the Bornean hill-partridge, is a species of bird in the family Phasianidae. It is endemic to hill and montane forest in Borneo, preferring bamboos and thickets. The International Union for Conservation of Nature (IUCN) has assessed it as a least-concern species.

== Taxonomy ==
Richard Bowdler Sharpe described this species as Bambusicola hyperythra in 1879, from specimens collected in northwestern Borneo by William Hood Treacher, who was Acting Governor of Labuan at that time. In 1890, Sharpe described the population on Mount Kinabalu as Bambusicola erythrophrys. It was formerly considered a subspecies, but it has been suggested that the brighter plumage on the face is due to age differences. The species is currently considered monotypic.

== Description ==
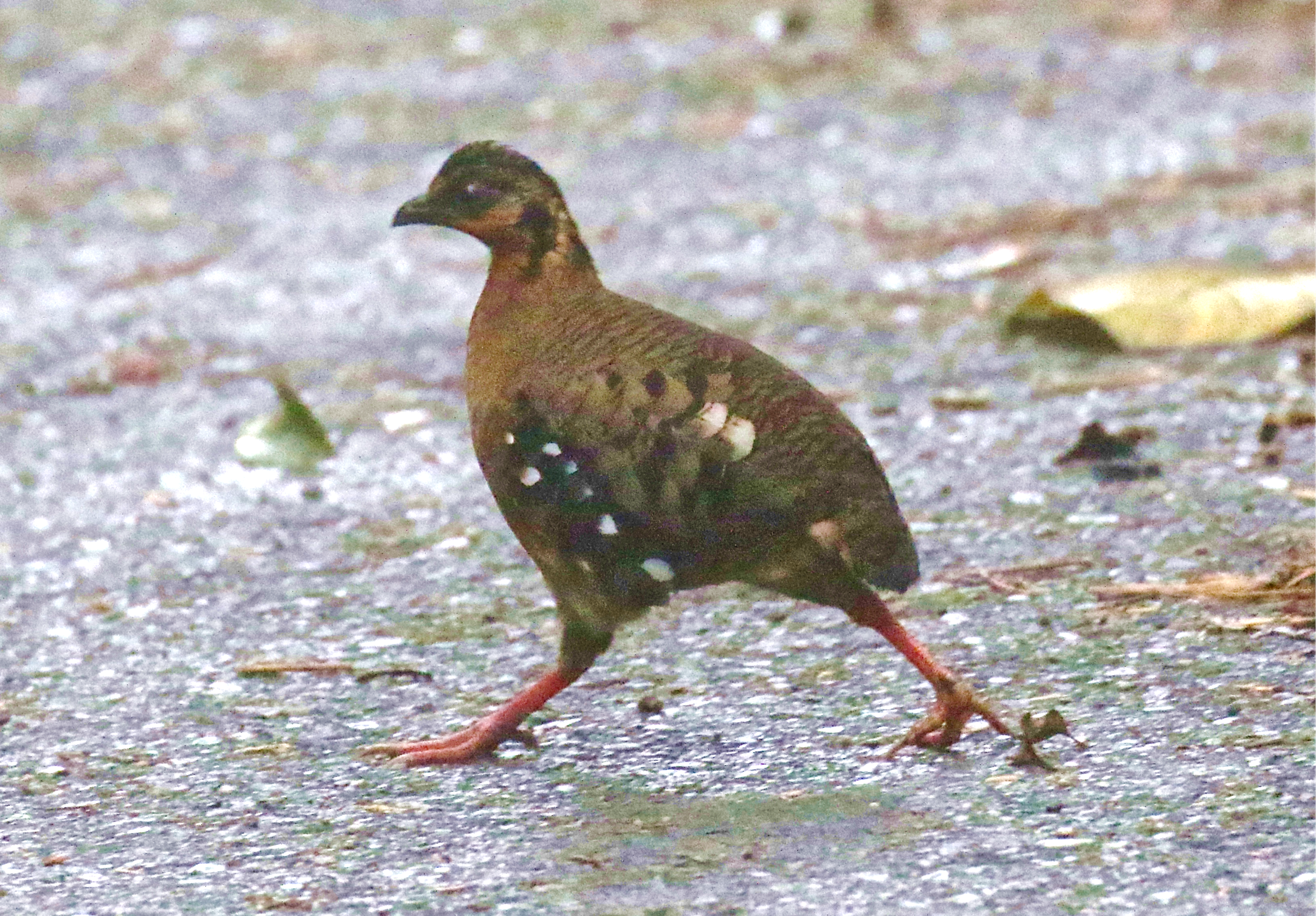
Mount Kinabalu Nat'l Park - Sabah, Borneo - Malaysia

The red-breasted partridge is about 27 cm (11 in) long and weighs about 270 g (9.5 oz). The crown and nape are blackish, with brown spots. There is a grey or rufous supercilium, and a blackish-brown band goes through the eye. The cheeks and throat are rufous. The breast is bright chestnut, sometimes browner, and the belly is whitish. The flanks are black and white. The upperparts are brown, with blackish bars. The eyes are grey, the beak is black, and the legs are pink. There is red bare skin around the throat, usually covered by sparse feathers. The female bird's plumage is a little duller than the male's.

== Distribution and habitat ==
This partridge is endemic to north-central Borneo, including parts of Sabah, Sarawak, North Kalimantan and northern Central Kalimantan. It lives in primary and secondary forests at elevations of 600–1,800 m (2,000–5,900 ft) and prefers bamboos and thickets.

== Behaviour ==
The red-breasted partridge feeds in groups, foraging in thickets, on forest roads and near rivers. Its diet consists of seeds, fruits and insects. It roosts in bushes. Its call is a duet, one bird giving rising chu notes and the other falling cuckoo notes. Its breeding is poorly known.

== Status ==
The population is declining because of habitat loss due to logging, hunting being a possible local threat. The decline is not rapid, so the IUCN has assessed it as a least-concern species.
