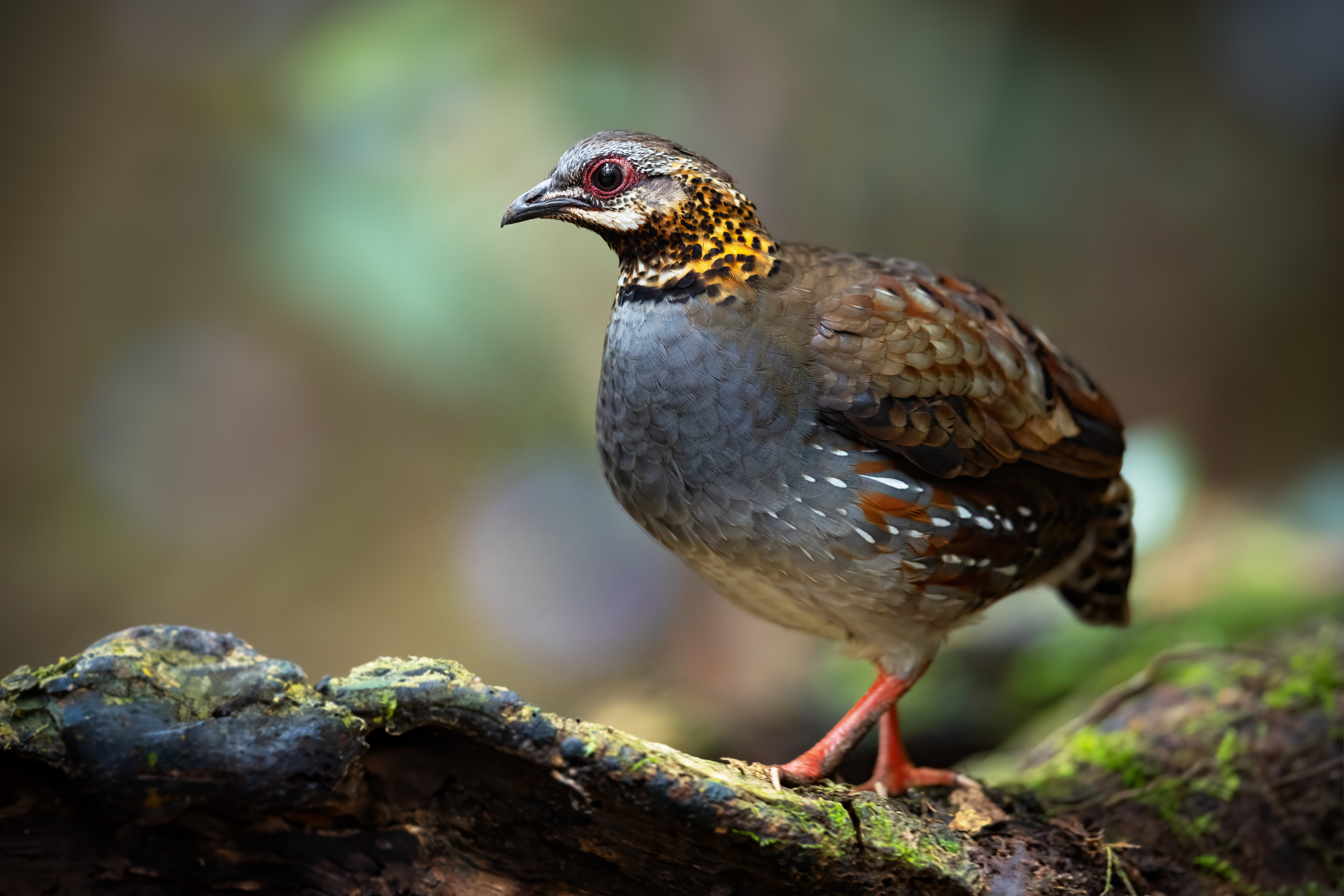
- Photograph taken near Da Lat in Vietnam

Conservation status
- Least Concern (IUCN 3.1)

Scientific classification
- Kingdom: Animalia
- Phylum: Chordata
- Class: Aves
- Order: Galliformes
- Family: Phasianidae
- Genus: Arborophila
- Species: A. rufogularis

Binomial name
- Arborophila rufogularis (Blyth, 1849)

Synonyms
- Arboricola rufogularis Blyth, 1849 (protonym)

Audio

= Rufous-throated partridge =

Species of bird

The rufous-throated partridge (Arborophila rufogularis) is a species of bird in the family Phasianidae. It is found in montane forests in India and Southeast Asia. The International Union for Conservation of Nature (IUCN) has assessed it as a least-concern species.

== Taxonomy ==
The rufous-throated partridge was formally described in 1849 by the English zoologist Edward Blyth based on birds from the Darjeeling district of the state of West Bengal in eastern India. He coined the binomial name Arboricola rufogularis where the specific epithet combines the Latin rufus meaning "red" with the Modern Latin gularis meaning "throated". The rufous-throated partridge is now one of 19 partridge species placed in the genus Arborophila that was introduced by Brian Hodgson in 1837.

Six subspecies are recognized:

- A. r. annamensis (Robinson & Kloss, 1919) - in south-central Vietnam.
- A. r. euroa (Bangs & Phillips J.C., 1914) - in southeastern Yunnan and northern Laos
- A. r. guttata (Delacour & Jabouille, 1928) - in central Vietnam and central Laos
- A. r. intermedia (Blyth, 1849) - ranging from northeastern India to northern Myanmar
- A. r. rufogularis (Blyth,1849) - found in northeastern India, Nepal, Bhutan and southeastern Tibet
- A. r. tickelli (Hume,1880) - in eastern Myanmar, Thailand and southwestern Laos

== Description ==
The rufous-throated partridge is 26–29 cm (10–11 in) long. The male weighs 325–430 g (11.5–15.2 oz) and the female weighs 261–386 g (9.2–13.6 oz). The male has a grey forehead. The olive-brown crown and nape have black mottles. There are a whitish supercilium and moustachial curves. The throat and neck-sides are orange-rufous, with black speckles. The breast and flanks are blue-grey. The upper belly is blue-grey and the central belly is whitish. The vent is buffy-brown. The mantle, back and rump are olive-brown. The scapulars and wing coverts have chestnut, black and greyish bands. The beak is dusky-brown or blackish, and the legs are pinkish or crimson. The female is similar to the male. The juvenile bird is duller below, and its crown and flanks have brown and black vermiculations. The subspecies have different patterns on their throats.

== Distribution and habitat ==
The rufous-throated partridge is found in Bangladesh, Bhutan, China, India, Laos, Myanmar, Nepal, Thailand, and Vietnam. Its natural habitat is montane forests, mainly at elevations of 1,800–3,000 metres (5,900–9,800 ft). Oak forests containing laurels and rhododendrons are preferred.

== Behaviour ==
This partridge feeds in groups of five to ten birds. It eats seeds, plant shoots, berries, insects and snails. Surprised birds run or fly, sometimes flying to branches like some thrushes. Birds in a covey roost and huddle together in trees, similar to babblers. Breeding has been recorded from April to July in India and from February to May in China. The male builds a scrape in bamboo, forest undergrowth or along water. The nest is lined or padded with grass. Three to five white eggs are laid. The rufous-throated partridge gives a rising series of hu-hu whistles. In a duet, the partner's call is kew-kew-kew.

== Status ==
The International Union for Conservation of Nature (IUCN) estimates that the species's population is declining because of habitat destruction and unsustainable hunting, but the decline is not rapid, and the range is large, so the IUCN has assessed it as a least-concern species.
