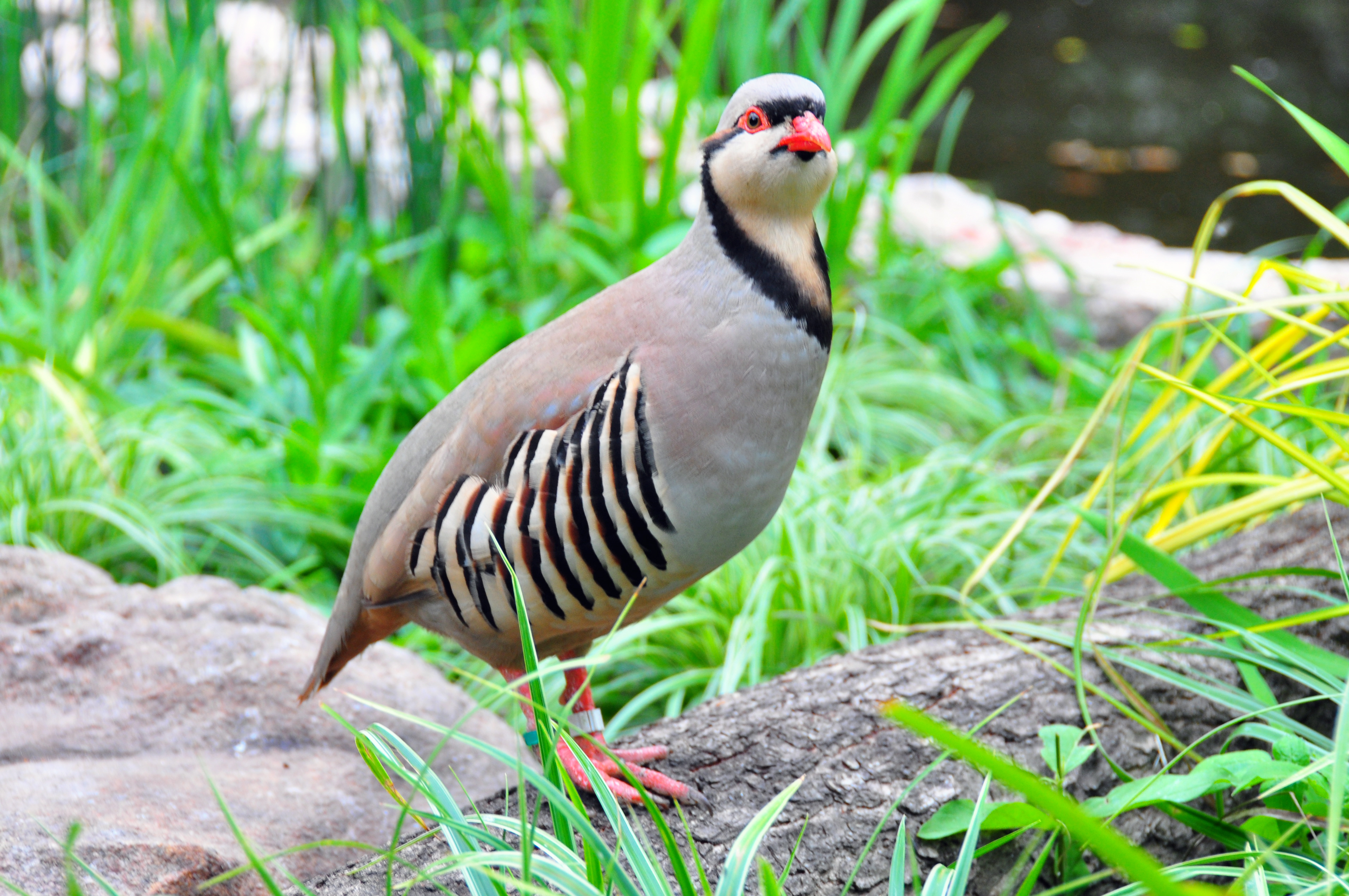
- Chukar at Weltvogelpark Walsrode, Germany

Conservation status
- Least Concern (IUCN 3.1)

Scientific classification
- Kingdom: Animalia
- Phylum: Chordata
- Class: Aves
- Order: Galliformes
- Family: Phasianidae
- Genus: Alectoris
- Species: A. chukar

Binomial name
- Alectoris chukar (J.E. Gray, 1830)

Subspecies
- List: A. c. chukar; A. c. cypriotes; A. c. dzungarica; A. c. falki; A. c. kleini; A. c. koroviakovi; A. c. kurdestanica; A. c. pallescens; A. c. pallida; A. c. potanini; A. c. pubescens; A. c. sinaica; A. c. subpallida; A. c. werae
- Rough distribution of chukar (green) and related partridges

Synonyms
- Caccabis kakelik

= Chukar partridge =

Species of bird

The chukar partridge (Alectoris chukar), or simply chukar, is a Palearctic upland gamebird in the pheasant family Phasianidae. It has been considered to form a superspecies complex along with the rock partridge, Philby's partridge and Przevalski's partridge and treated in the past as conspecific particularly with the first. This partridge has well-marked black and white bars on the flanks and a black band running from the forehead across the eye down the head to form a necklace that encloses a white throat. Native to Asia, the species has been introduced into many other places and feral populations have established themselves in parts of North America, Malta and New Zealand. This bird can be found in parts of Middle East and temperate Asia.

== Description ==
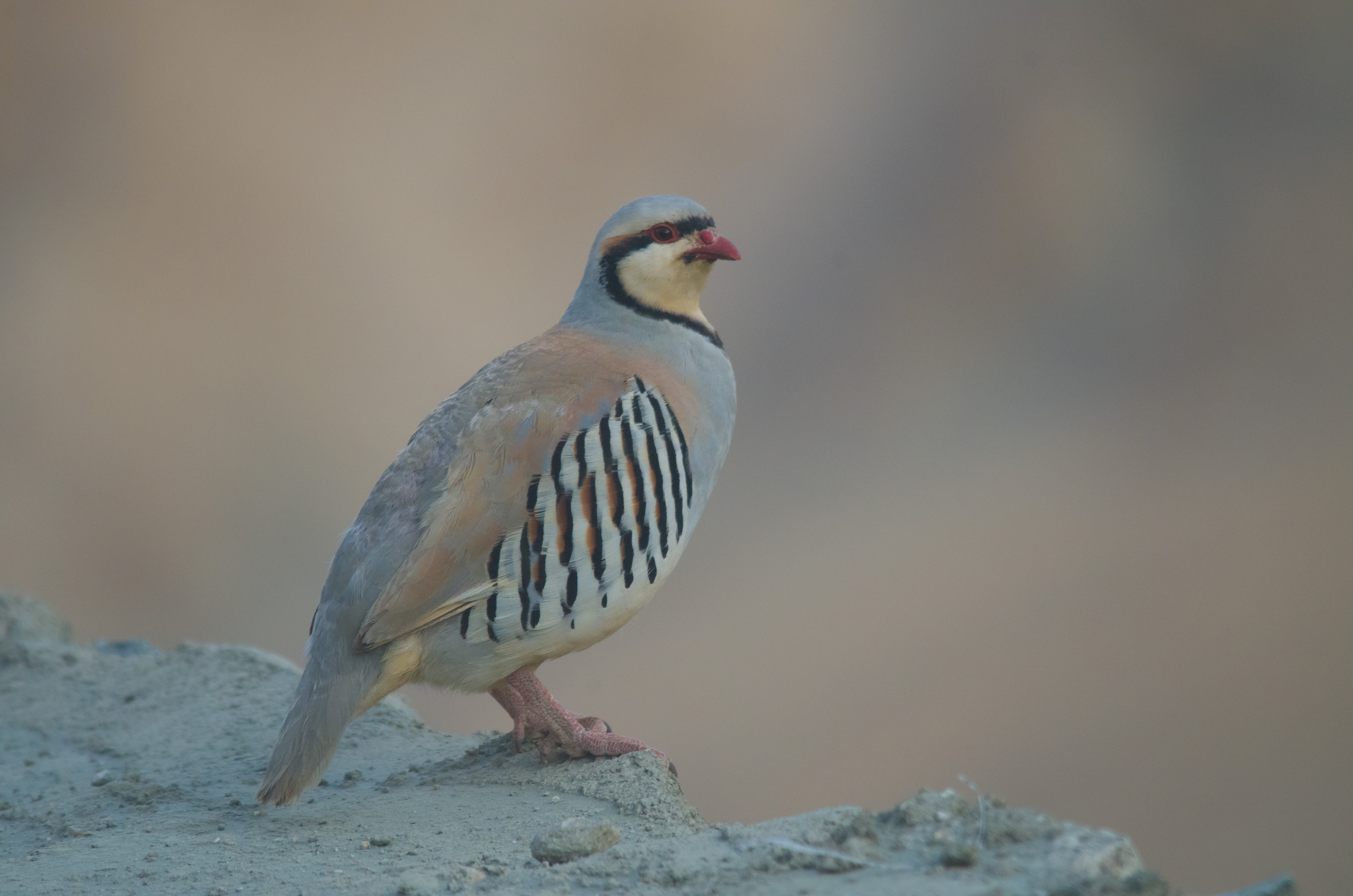
Chukar at Chang La, Ladakh, India.

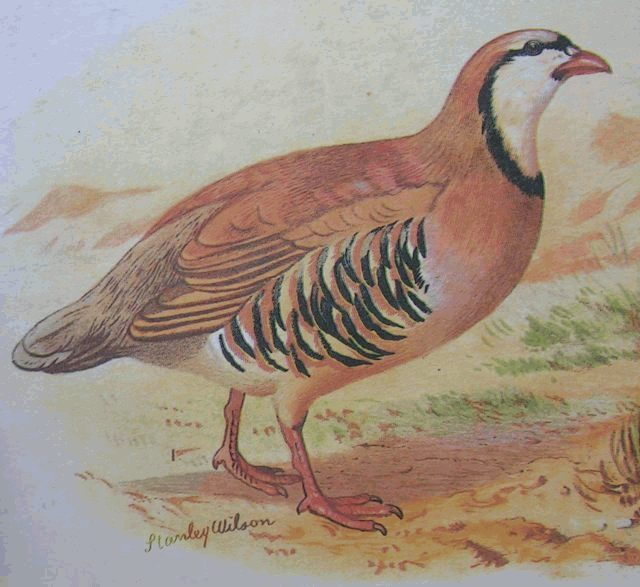
Illustration from Hume and Marshall's Game Birds of India, Burma and Ceylon

The chukar is a rotund 32–35 cm (13–14 in) long partridge, with a light brown back, grey breast, and buff belly. The shades vary across the various populations. The face is white with a black gorget. It has rufous-streaked flanks, red legs and coral red bill. Sexes are similar, the female slightly smaller in size and lacking the spur. The tail has 14 feathers, the third primary is the longest while the first is level with the fifth and sixth primaries.

It is very similar to the rock partridge (Alectoris graeca) with which it has been lumped in the past but is browner on the back and has a yellowish tinge to the foreneck. The sharply defined gorget distinguishes this species from the red-legged partridge which has the black collar breaking into dark streaks near the breast. Their song is a noisy chuck-chuck-chukar-chukar from which the name is derived. The Barbary partridge (Alectoris barbara) has a reddish-brown rather than black collar with a grey throat and face with a chestnut crown.

Other common names of this bird include chukker (chuker or chukor), Indian chukar and keklik.

== Distribution and habitat ==
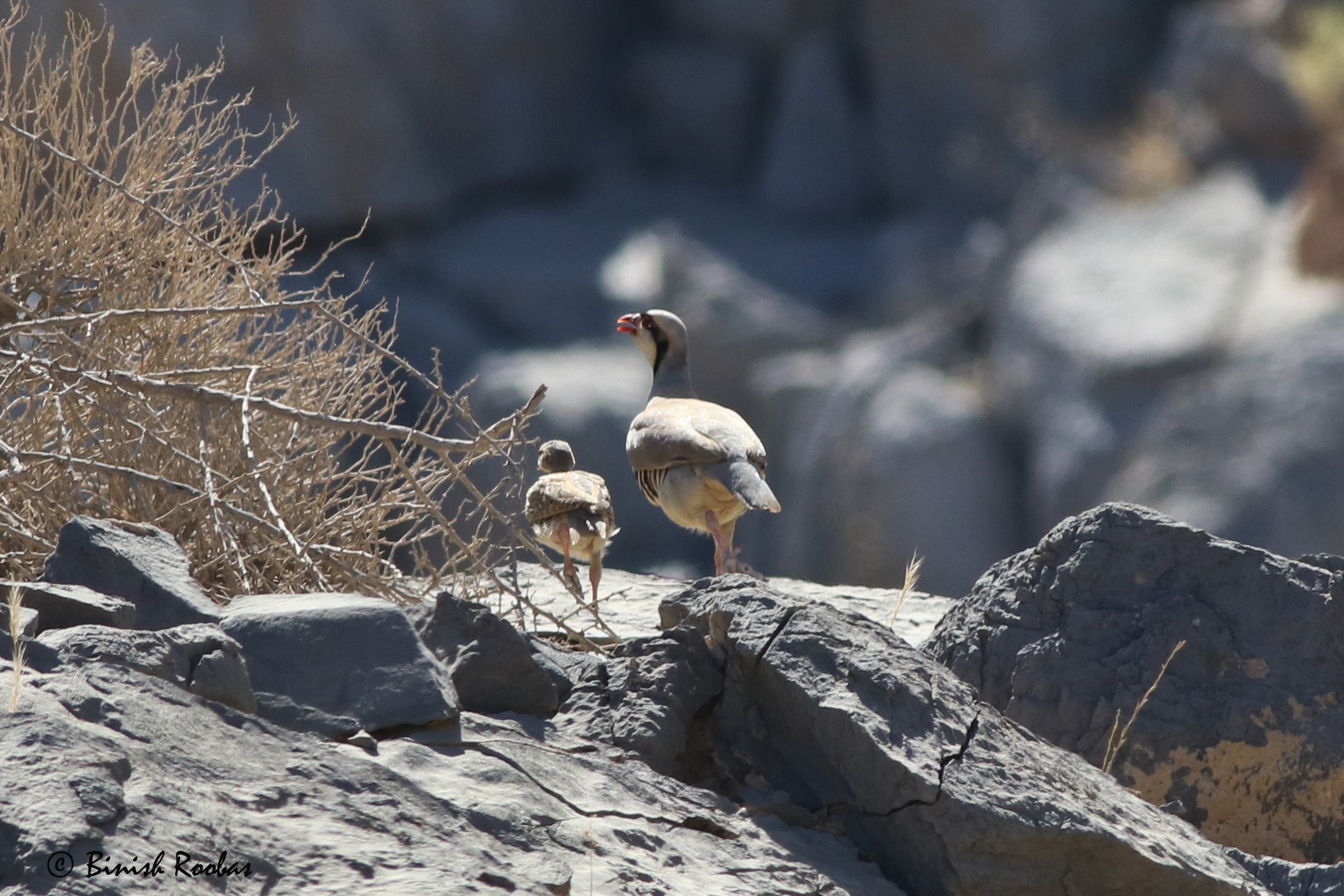
Chukar Patridge from United Arab Emirates

This partridge has its native range in Asia, including Israel, Jordan, Palestine, Lebanon, Syria, United Arab Emirates, Saudi Arabia, Oman, Turkey, Kurdistan, Iran, Afghanistan, Tajikistan, Pakistan and India, along the inner ranges of the western Himalayas to Nepal, as well as southeasternmost Europe in Bulgaria and Greece. Further west in southeastern Europe it is replaced by the rock partridge, Alectoris graeca. It barely ranges into Africa on the Sinai Peninsula. The habitat in the native range is rocky open hillsides with grass or scattered scrub or cultivation. In Israel and Jordan it is found at low altitudes, starting at 400 m (1,300 ft) below sea level in the Dead Sea area, whereas in the more eastern areas it is mainly found at an altitude of 2,000 to 4,000 m (6,600 to 13,100 ft) except in Pakistan, where it occurs at 600 m (2,000 ft). They are not found in areas of high humidity or rainfall.

It has been introduced widely as a game bird, and feral populations have become established in the United States (Rocky Mountains, Great Basin, high desert areas of California), Canada, Chile, Argentina, New Zealand and Hawaii. Initial introductions into the US were from the nominate populations collected from Afghanistan and Nepal. The birds are hunted across the dry, rocky Columbia Basin, especially in the vicinity of the Snake River in Washington and Oregon. It has also been introduced to New South Wales in Australia but breeding populations have not persisted and are probably extinct. A small population exists on Robben Island in South Africa since it was introduced there in 1964.

The chukar readily interbreeds with the red-legged partridge (Alectoris rufa), and the practice of breeding and releasing captive-bred hybrids has been banned in various countries including the United Kingdom, as it is a threat to wild populations.

== Systematics and taxonomy ==
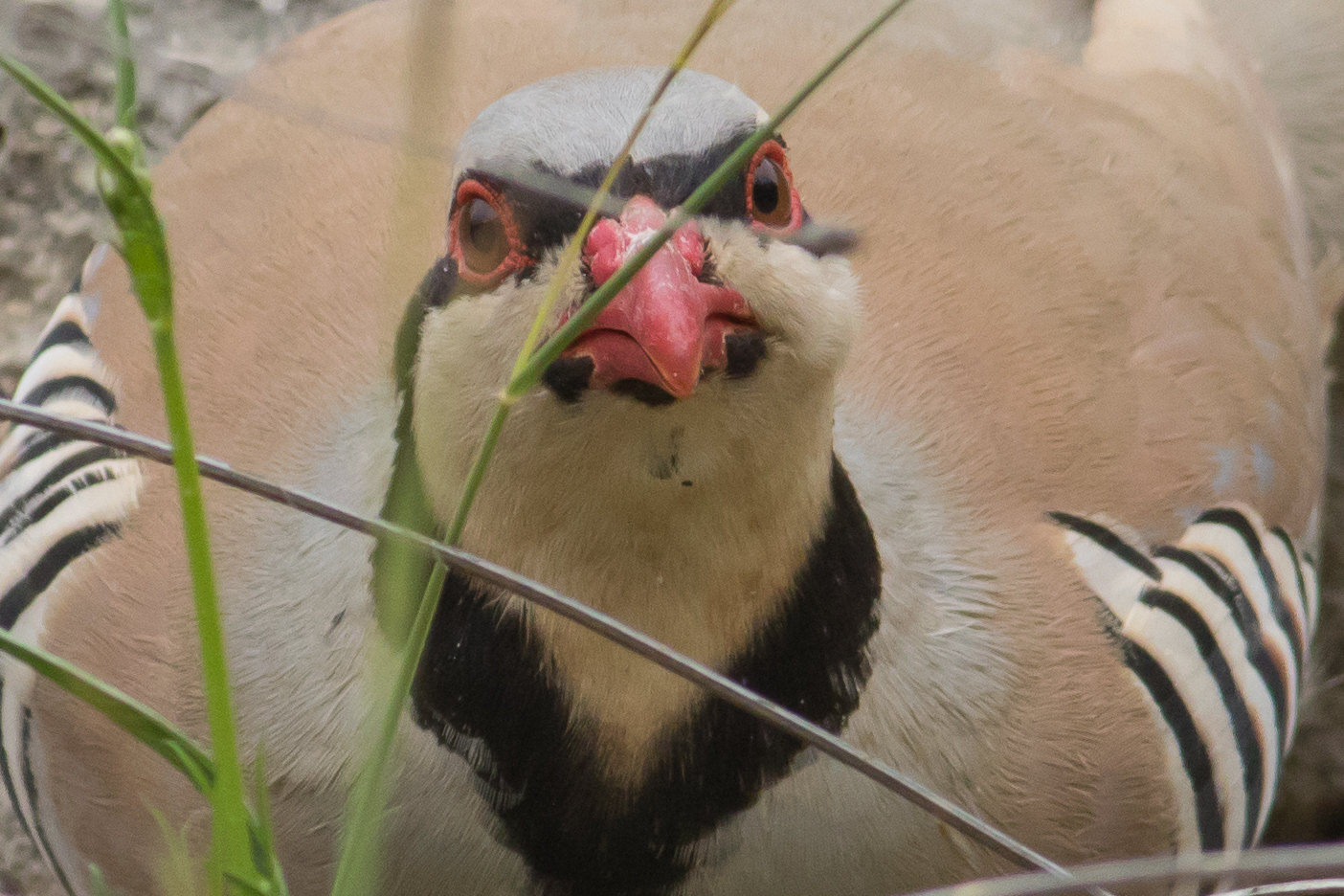
Alectoris chukar

The chukar partridge is part of a confusing group of "red-legged partridges". Several plumage variations within the widespread distribution of the chukar partridge have been described and designated as subspecies. In the past the chukar group was included with the rock partridge (also known as the Greek partridge). The species from Turkey and farther east was subsequently separated from A. graeca of Greece and Bulgaria and western Europe.

=== Subspecies ===
The chukar has 14 recognized subspecies:

- A. c. chukar (nominate species) (J. E. Gray, 1830) - eastern Afghanistan to eastern Nepal
- A. c. cypriotes (Hartert, 1917) - southeastern Bulgaria to southern Syria, Crete, Rhodes and Cyprus
- A. c. dzungarica (Sushkin, 1927) – northwestern Mongolia to Russian Altai and eastern Tibet
- A. c. falki (Hartert, 1917) – north central Afghanistan to Pamir Mountains and western China
- A. c. kleini (Hartert, 1925) – northern Greece through Bulgaria and north Turkey to the Caucasus
- A. c. koroviakovi (Zarudny, 1914) – eastern Iran to Pakistan
- A. c. kurdestanica (Meinertzhagen, 1923) – Caucasus Mountains to Iran
- A. c. pallescens (Hume, 1873) – northeastern Afghanistan to Ladakh and western Tibet
- A. c. pallida (Hume, 1873) – northwestern China
- A. c. potanini (Sushkin, 1927) – western Mongolia
- A. c. pubescens (R. Swinhoe, 1871) – inner Mongolia to northwestern Sichuan and eastern Qinghai
- A. c. sinaica (Bonaparte, 1858) – northern Syrian Desert to Sinai Peninsula
- A. c. subpallida (Zarudny, 1914) – Kyzyl Kum and Kara Kum Mountains (Tajikistan)
- A. c. werae (Zarudny and Loudon, 1904) – eastern Iraq and southwestern Iran

== Population and status ==
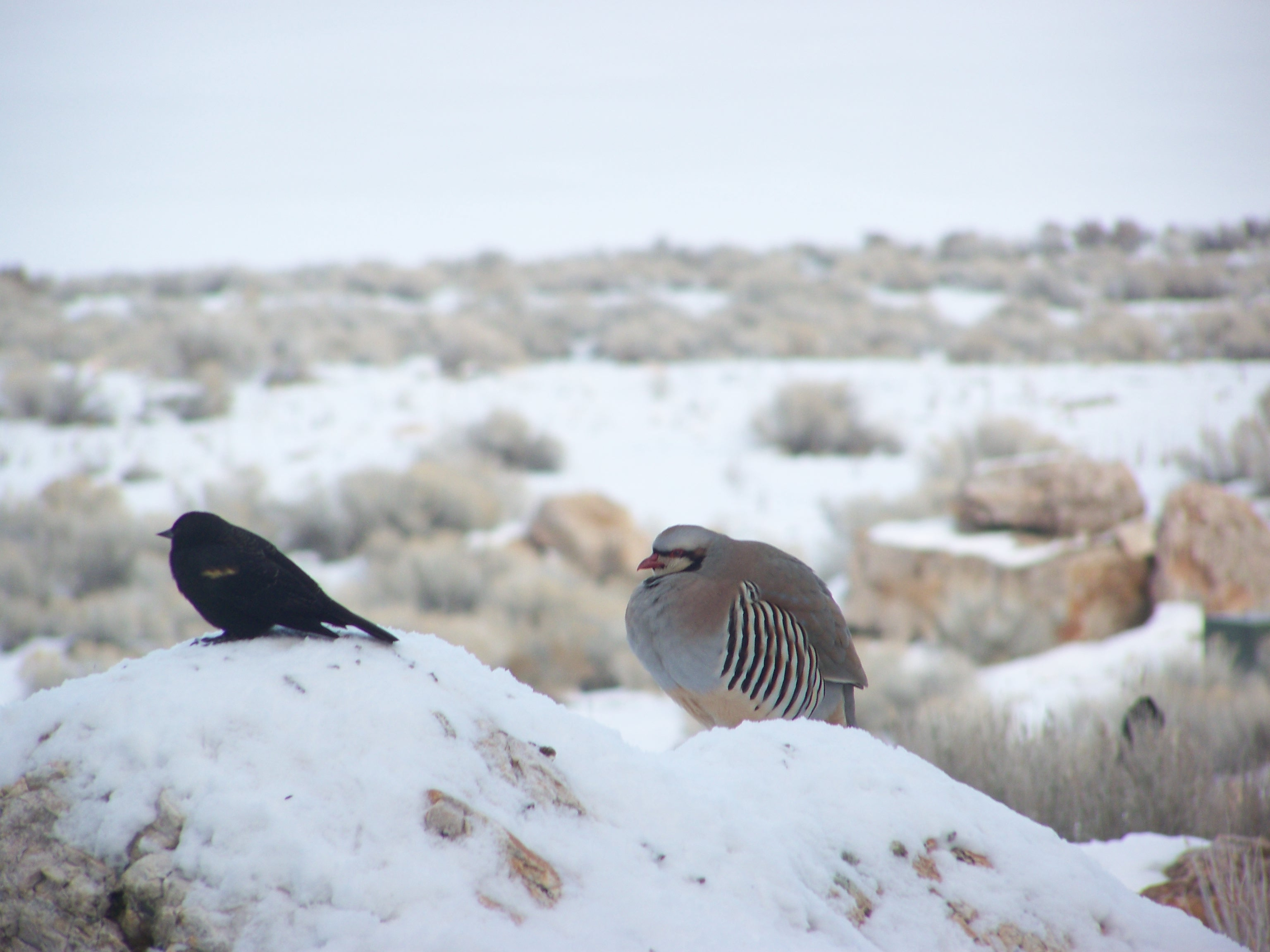
Chukar partridge (right) in the Antelope Island State Park, Utah, US

This species is relatively unaffected by hunting or loss of habitat. Its numbers are largely affected by weather patterns during the breeding season. The release of captive stock in some parts of southern Europe can threaten native populations of rock partridge and red-legged partridge with which they may hybridize.

British sportsmen in India considered the chukar as good sport although they were not considered to be particularly good in flavour. Their fast flight and ability to fly some distance after being shot made recovery of the birds difficult without retriever dogs. During cold winters, when the higher areas are covered in snow, people in Kashmir have been known to use a technique to tire the birds out to catch them.

Regarded as the national bird of the Kurdish nation, it is currently in Iraqi Kurdistan, due to uncontrolled, illegal hunting.

In the non-breeding season, chukar partridge are found in small coveys of 10 or more (up to 50) birds. In summer, chukars form pairs to breed. During this time, the cocks are very pugnacious in their calling and fighting. During winter they descend into the valleys and feed in fields. They call frequently during the day and especially in the mornings and evenings. The call is loud and includes loud repeated chuck notes and sometimes duetting chuker notes. Several calls varying with context have been noted. The most common call is a "rallying call" which when played back elicits a response from birds and has been used in surveys, although the method is not very reliable. When disturbed, it prefers to run rather than fly, but if necessary it flies a short distance often down a slope on rounded wings, calling immediately after alighting. In Utah, birds were found to forage in an area of about 2.6 km^{2} (1.0 sq mi) and travel up to 4.8 km (3.0 mi) to obtain water during the dry season. The home range was found to be even smaller in Idaho.

The breeding season is summer. Males perform tidbitting displays, a form of courtship feeding where the male pecks at food and a female may visit to peck in response. The males may chase females with head lowered, wing lowered and neck fluffed. The male may also perform a high step stiff walk while making a special call. The female may then crouch in acceptance and the male mounts to copulate, while grasping the nape of the female. Males are monogamous. The nest is a scantily lined ground scrape, though occasionally a compact pad is created with a depression in the centre. Generally, the nests are sheltered by ferns and small bushes, or placed in a dip or rocky hillside under an overhanging rock. About 7 to 14 eggs are laid. The eggs hatch in about 23–25 days. In captivity they can lay an egg each day during the breeding season if eggs are collected daily. Chicks join their parents in foraging and will soon join the chicks of other members of the covey.

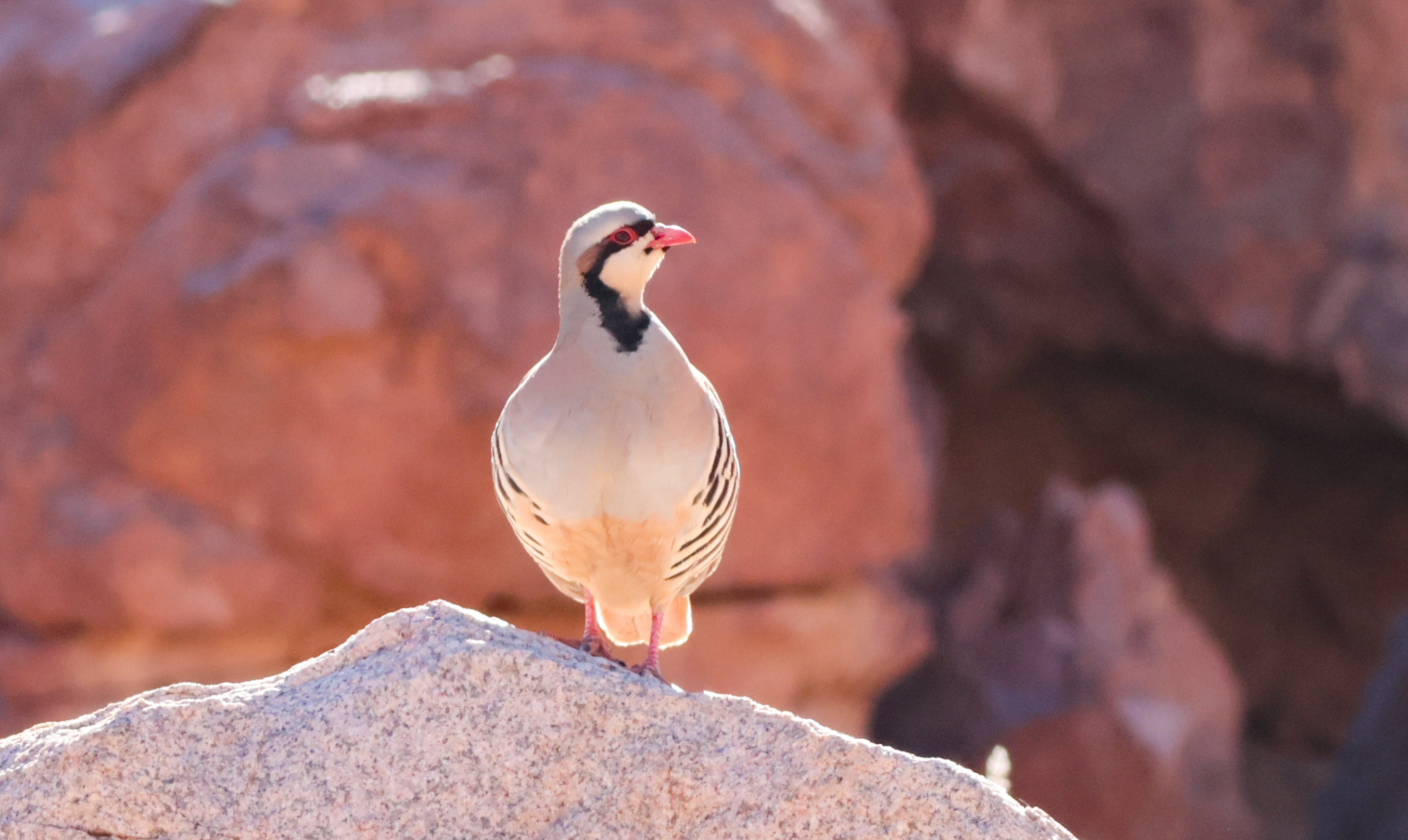
Chukar from Jebel Al Lawz, Saudi Arabia

As young chukars grow, and before flying for the first time, they utilize wing-assisted incline running as a transition to adult flight. This behaviour is found in several bird species, but has been extensively studied in chukar chicks, as a model to explain the evolution of avian flight.

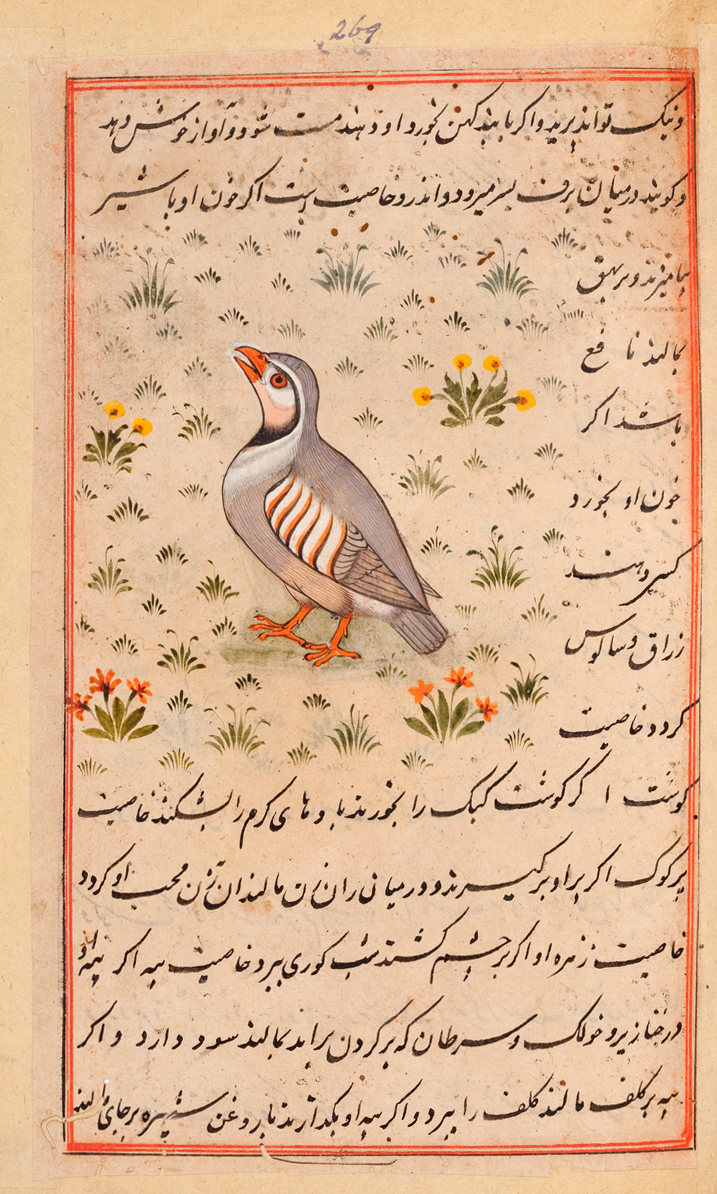
A chukar in a 17th-century Persian encyclopedia

Chukar will take a wide variety of seeds and some insects as food. It also ingests grit. In Kashmir, the seeds of a species of Eragrostis was particularly dominant in their diet while those in the US favoured Bromus tectorum. Birds feeding on succulent vegetation make up for their water needs but visit open water in summer.

Chukar roost on rocky slopes or under shrubs. In the winter, birds in the US selected protected niches or caves. A group may roost in a tight circle with their heads pointed outwards to conserve heat and keep a look out for predators.

Chukar are sometimes preyed on by golden eagles.

Birds in captivity can die from Mycoplasma infection and outbreaks of other diseases such as erysipelas.

== In culture ==
The name is onomatopoeic and mentions of chakor in Sanskrit, from northern Indian date back to the Markandeya Purana (c. 250–500 AD). In North Indian and Pakistani culture, as well as in Hindu mythology, the chukar (referred as Chakor) sometimes symbolizes intense, and often unrequited, love. It is said to be in love with the moon and gazes at it constantly. Because of their pugnacious behaviour during the breeding season they are kept in some areas as fighting birds.

It is also mentioned in a variety of Jewish sources, such as the Torah, Jeremiah, Samuel, Talmud, and Mishnah. When David was being targeted by King Saul, he accuses Saul of pursuing him "as the partridge hunts."

It is a popular subject in Kurdish art, poetry, and folk songs, symbolic of Kurdish identity.

== Gallery ==
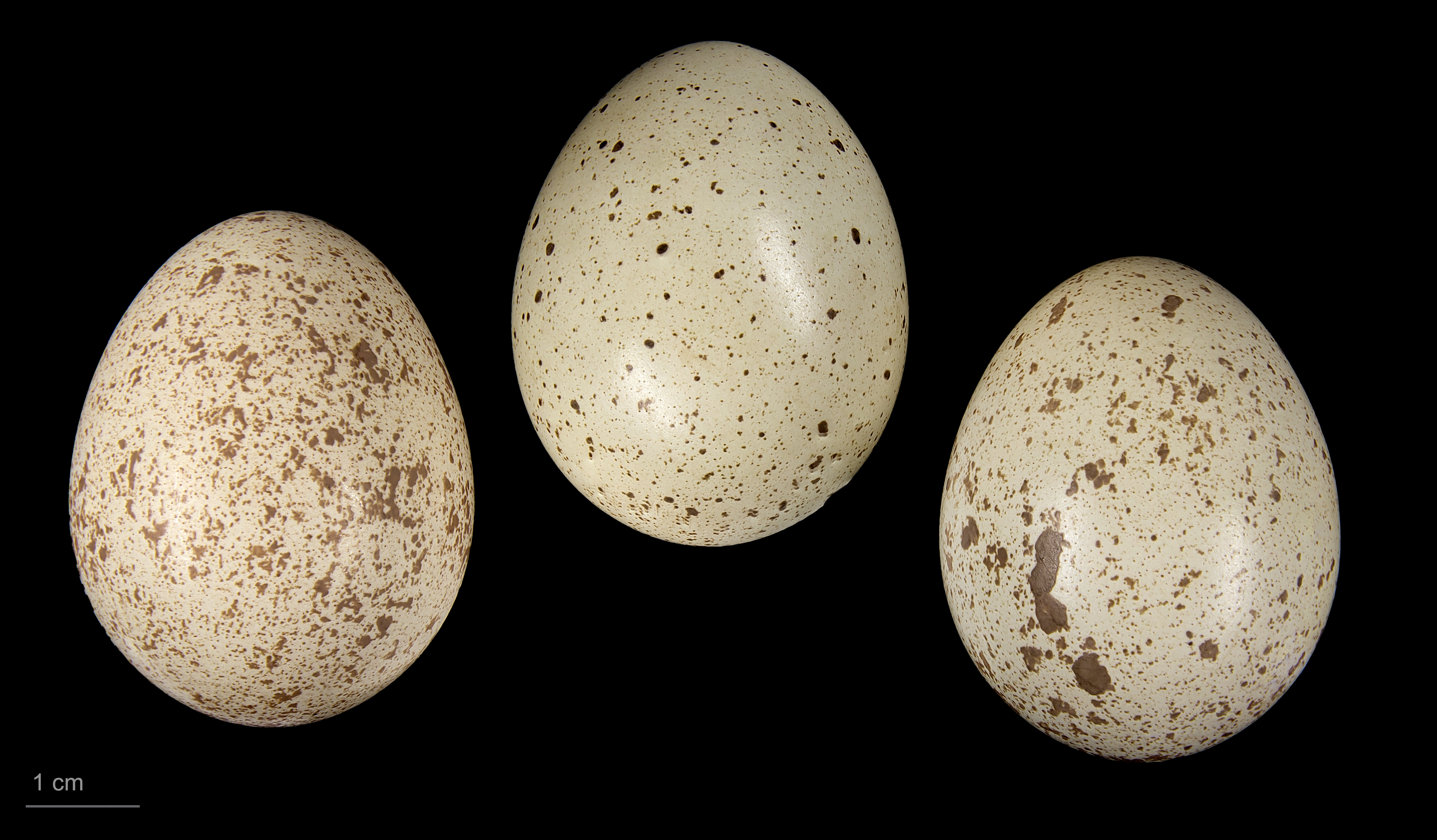
Eggs

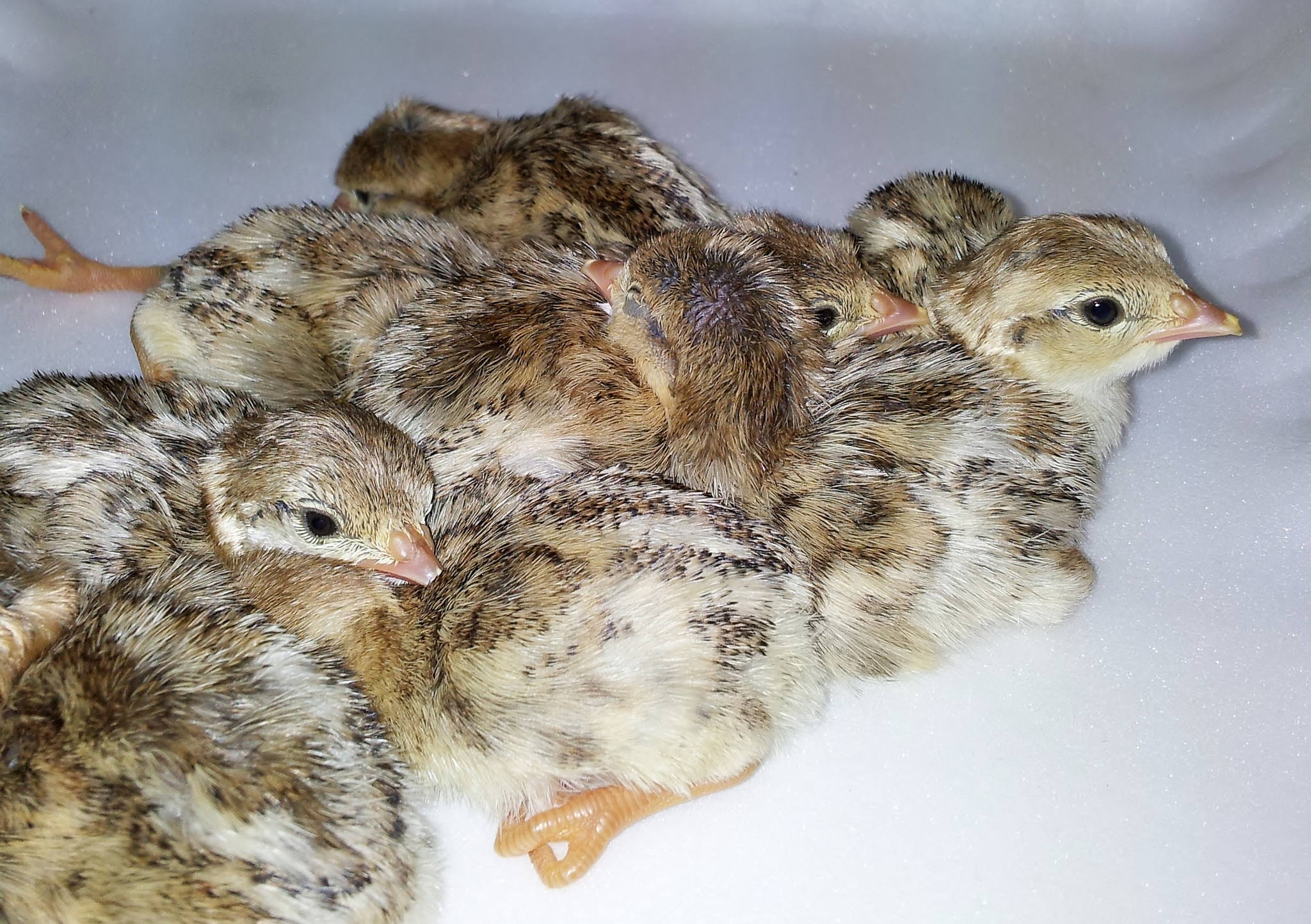
1-day-old chicks

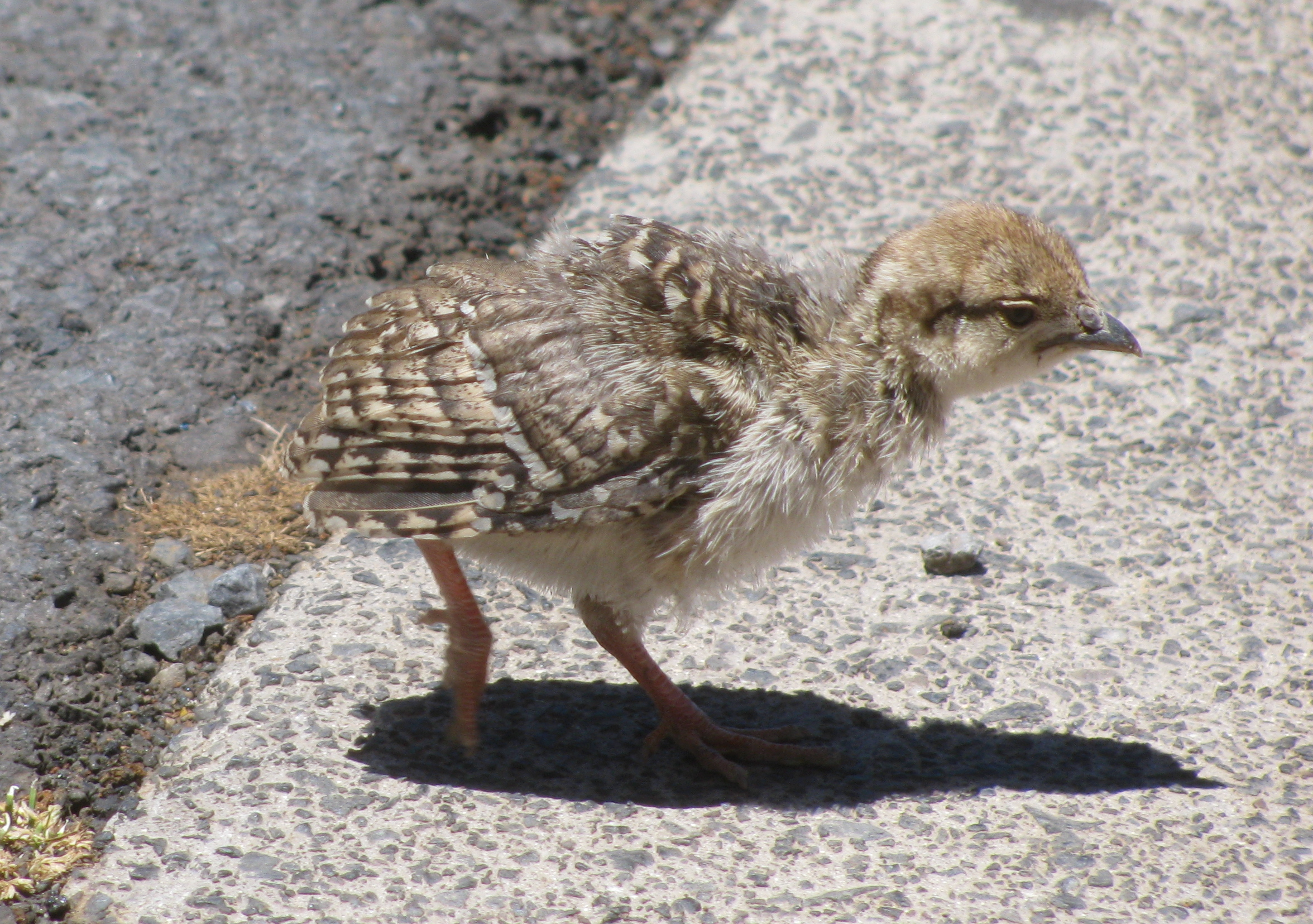
Juvenile

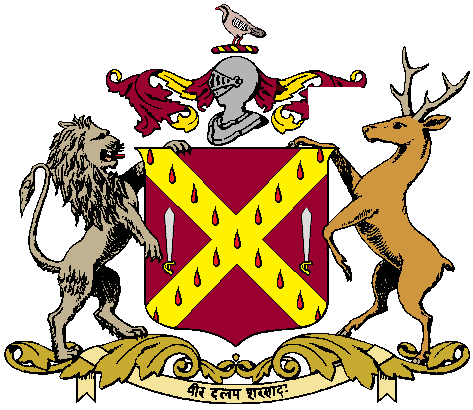
Chukar in Indian heraldry

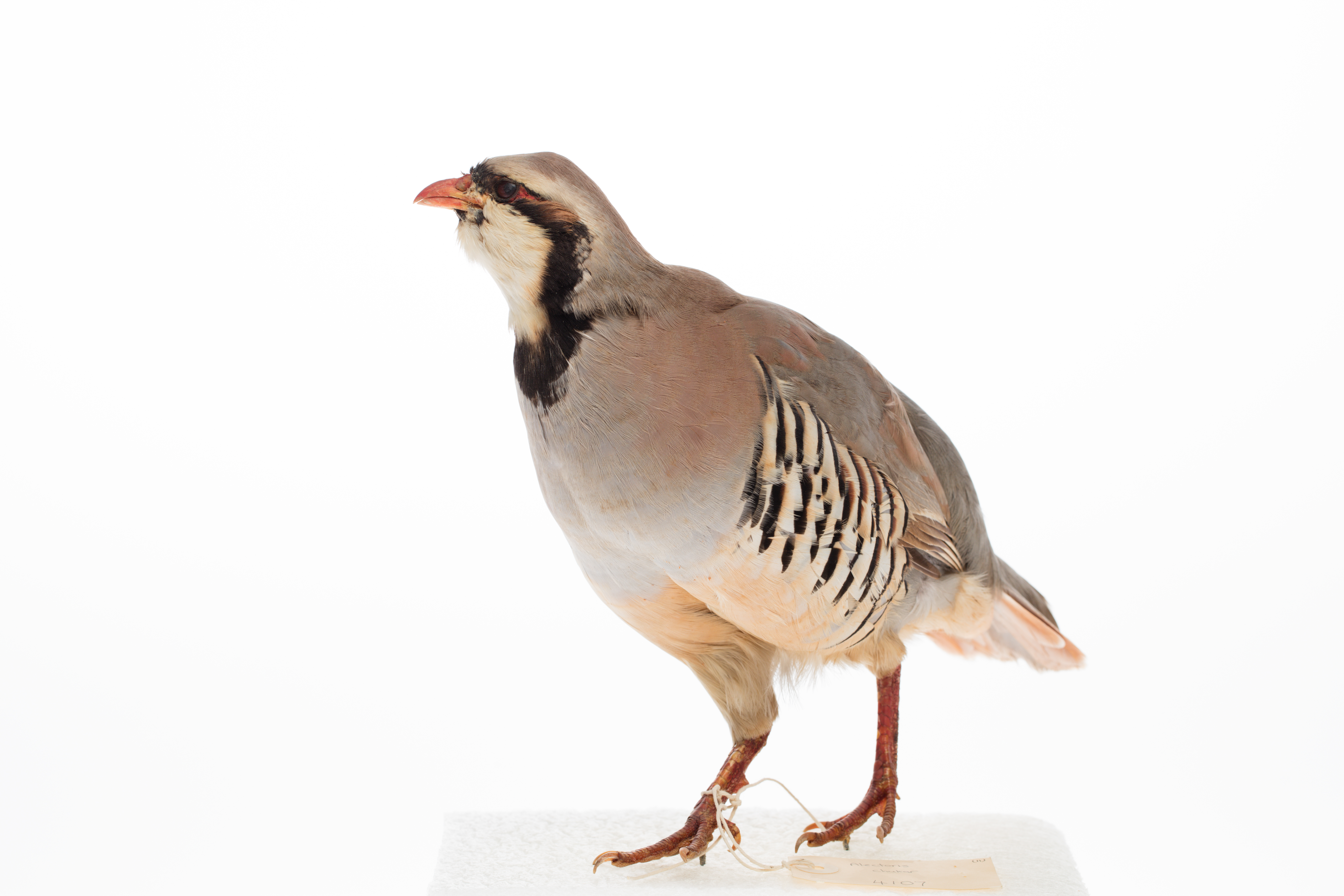
Taxidermy

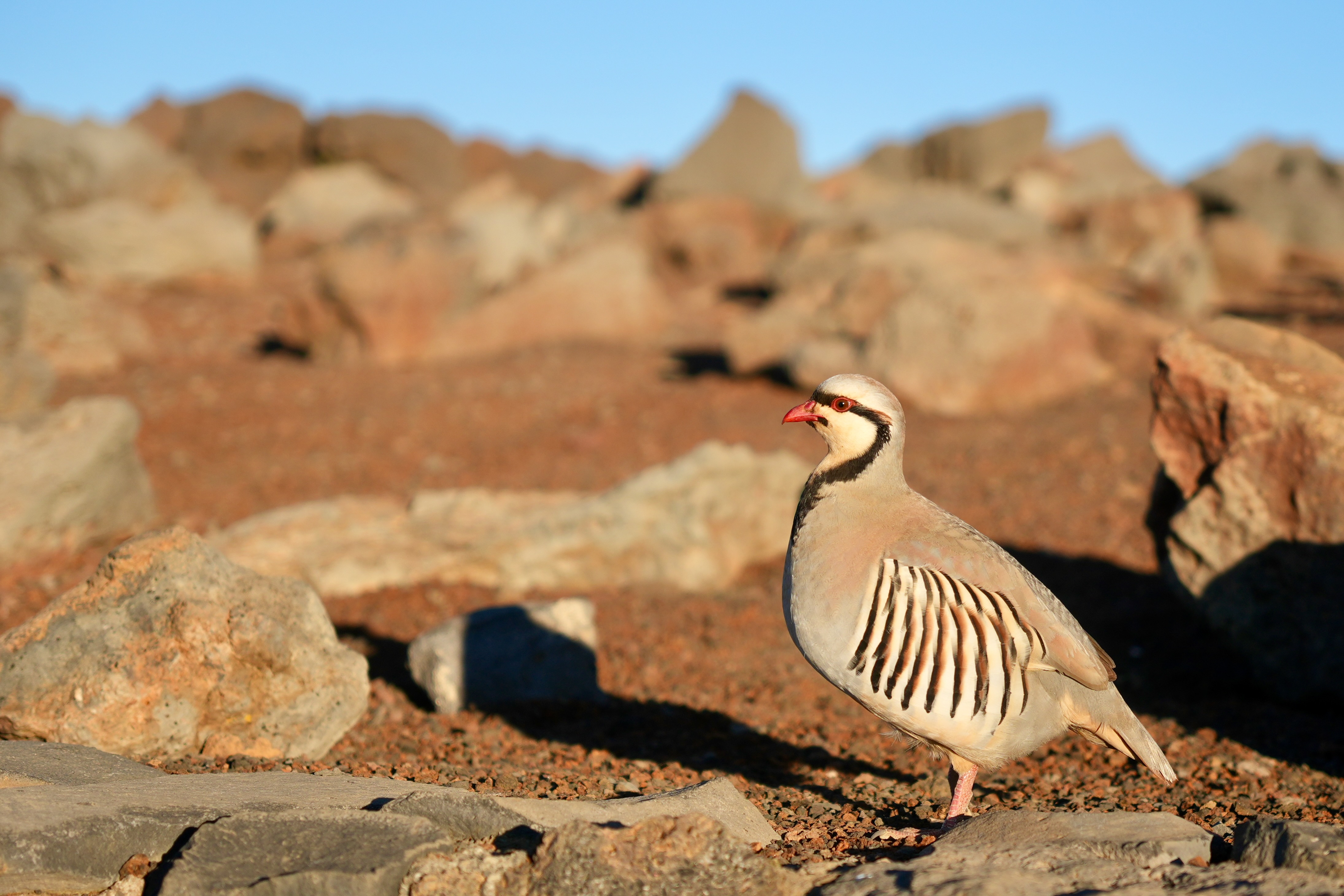
Near Haleakala summit, Maui
