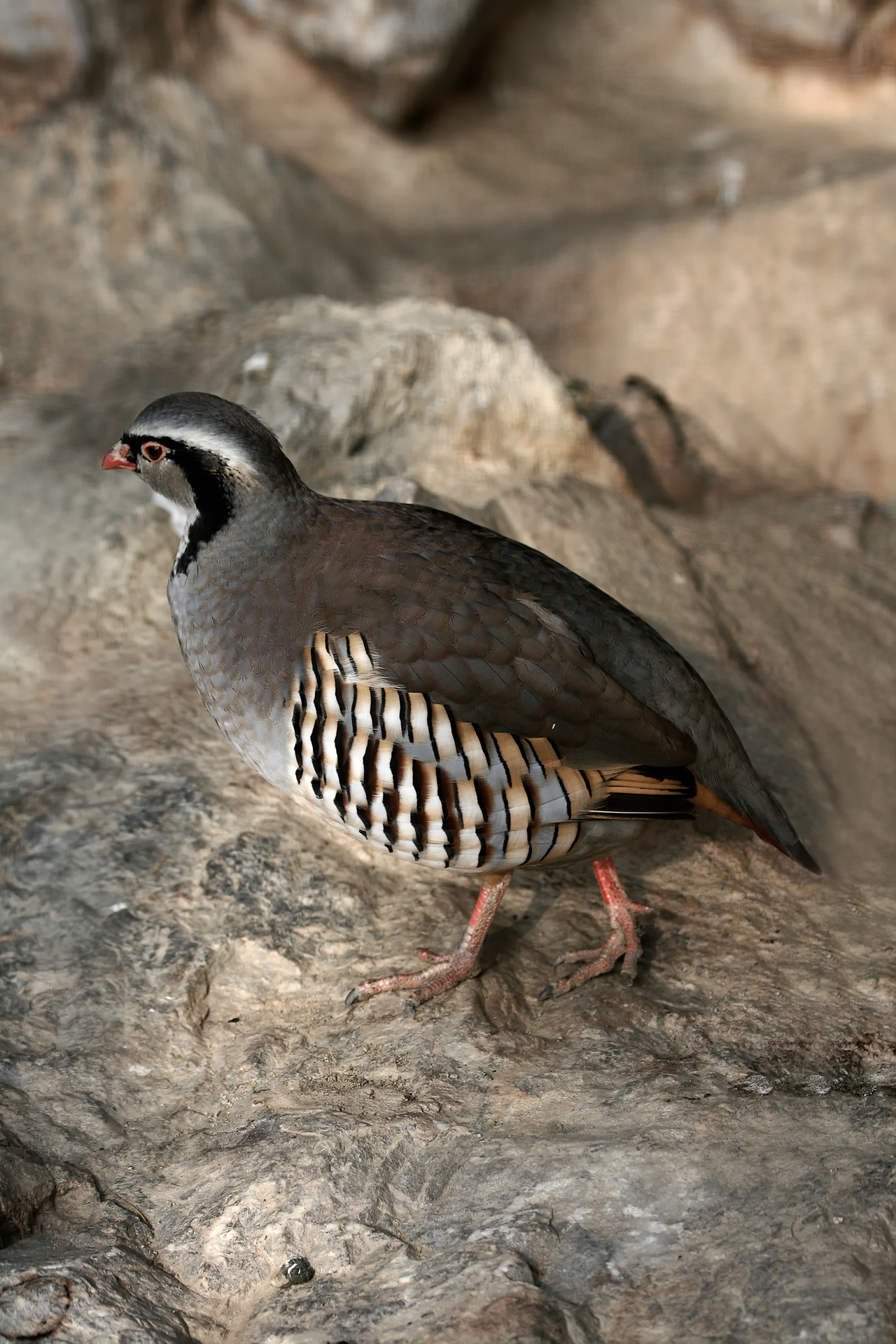

Conservation status
- Near Threatened (IUCN 3.1)

Scientific classification
- Kingdom: Animalia
- Phylum: Chordata
- Class: Aves
- Order: Galliformes
- Family: Phasianidae
- Genus: Alectoris
- Species: A. graeca

Binomial name
- Alectoris graeca (Meisner, 1804)

Subspecies
- See text

Synonyms
- Perdix graeca Meisner, 1804

= Rock partridge =

Species of bird

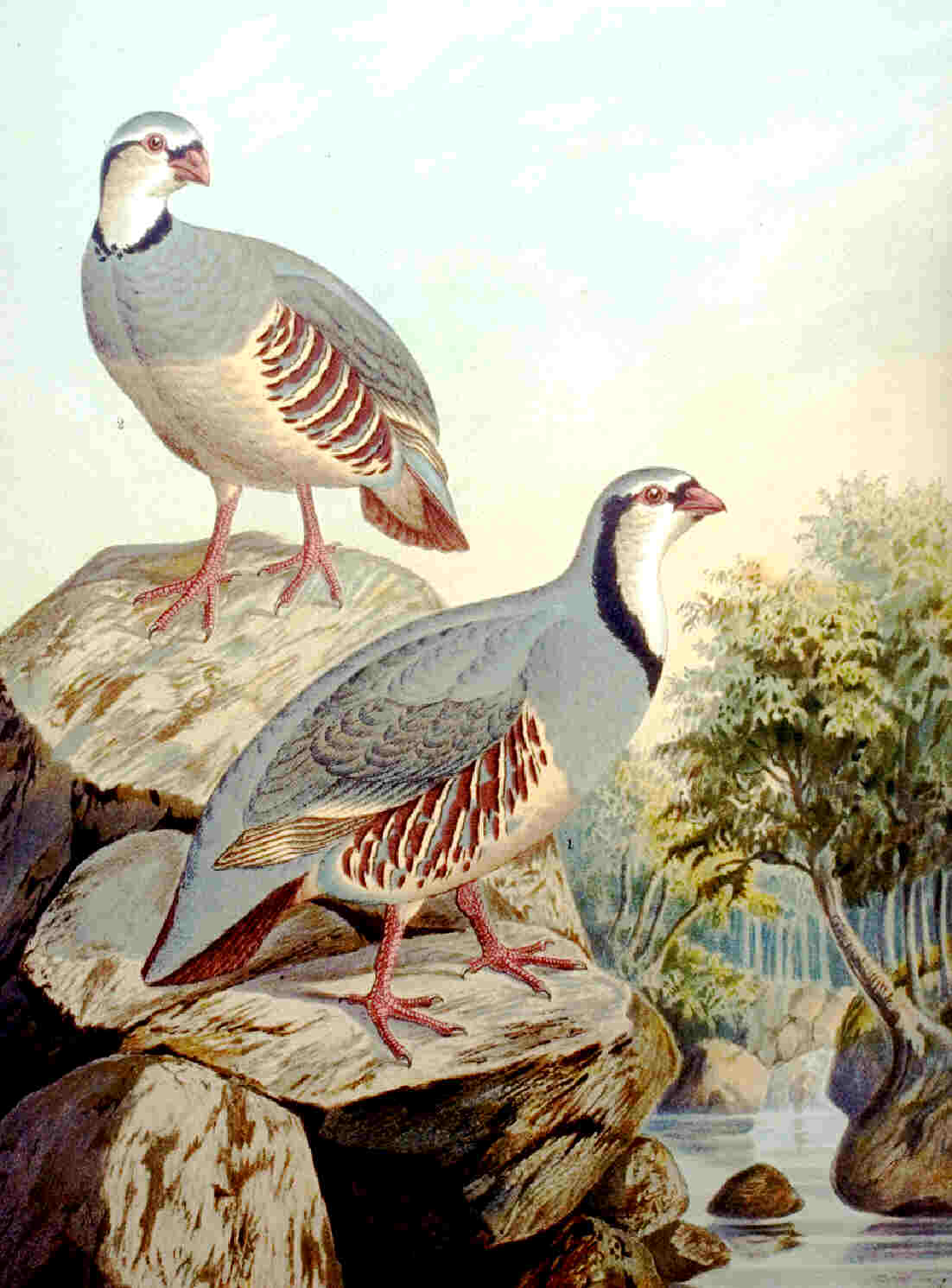
Rock partridge

The rock partridge or common rock partridge (Alectoris graeca) is a gamebird in the pheasant family, Phasianidae, of the order Galliformes (gallinaceous birds). It is native to southern Europe, and is closely related and very similar to its eastern equivalent, the chukar partridge, A. chukar.

== Habitat ==
It is a resident breeder in dry, open and often hilly country.

== Breeding ==
It nests in a scantily lined ground scrape laying 5–21 eggs.

== Diet ==
The rock partridge takes a wide variety of seeds and some insect food.

== Description ==
The rock partridge is a rotund bird, with a light brown back, grey breast and buff belly. The face is white with a black gorget. It has rufous-streaked flanks and red legs. When disturbed, it prefers to run rather than fly, but if necessary it flies a short distance on rounded wings. It is very similar to the chukar partridge, but is greyer on the back and has a white, not yellowish foreneck. The sharply defined gorget distinguishes this species from red-legged partridge. The song is a noisy ga-ga-ga-ga-chakera- chakera- chakera.

Some confusion exists in the naming of this species because the name of the species called stone partridge in English translates literally from other languages into English as "rock partridge". For instance, in Dutch the species is rotspatrijs, in German – Felsenhenne, in French – poulette de roche – all literal translations of "rock partridge". The confusion is further compounded as in some languages, Alectoris species are known by names that literally translate as stone partridge. In Dutch, steenpatrijs, in German Steinhuhn; red-legged partridge (A. rufa) being rode steenpatrijs in Dutch. Further complication arises as, particularly within the US, the name "rock partridge" has been used for a variety of Alectoris species and hybrids. The international bird trade, for sport, aviaries' and meat, has led to misapplication of various of these common and scientific names.

== Conservation ==
This species is declining in parts of its range due to habitat loss and over-hunting. While populations are usually stable, the status of the Sicilian population may be more precarious, and certainly deserves attention (Randi 2006).

== Taxonomy ==
This species is closely related to the chukar, Przevalski's, and Philby's partridges, forming a superspecies. The Western Mediterranean red-legged and Barbary partridges with their spotted neck collar are slightly more distant relatives. Nonetheless, although this species' range does not naturally overlap with that of its relatives, they co-occur where they have been introduced as gamebirds, for example in North America, the United Kingdom, New Zealand, and Russia, and in southeastern France where red-legged partridges have been released. In these areas, hybrids between this species, the chukar, and the red-legged partridge are usually found.(McGowan 1994, see also Randi 2006)

The rock partridge has four recognized subspecies:

- A. g. graeca (Meisner, 1804) - Serbia and Albania to Greece and Bulgaria
- A. g. orlandoi (Priolo, 1984) - Italy
- A. g. saxatilis (Bechstein, 1805) – Alps from France to western Croatia
- A. g. whitakeri (Schiebel, 1934) – Sicily
- A. g. martelensis – paleosubspecies, only known from fossils

The proposed subspecies from the Apennines, A. g. orlandoi Priolo, 1984, is of doubtful validity. It is usually included in saxatilis, but apparently mostly derives from Albanian A. g. graeca. These probably crossed the Adriatic via a land-bridge during the last ice age, to become isolated only with the sea levels rising at the beginning of the Holocene c.12.000–10.000 years ago, with Alpine birds much less contributing to the Apennines population (Randi 2006).

Apennine birds are not consistently recognizable by external morphology, and are only weakly differentiated with regard to mtDNA D-loop and hypervariable control region sequences and microsatellite genotyping. As they nonetheless constitute a discrete subpopulation evolving towards subspecies status, their population numbers could arguably deserve monitoring (Randi 2006).
