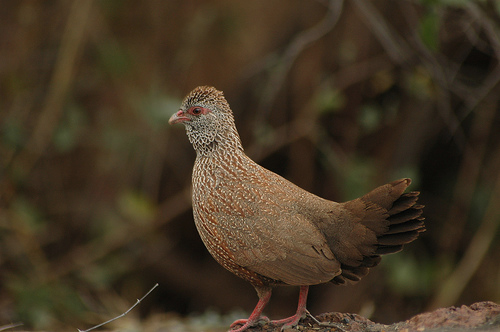

Conservation status
- Least Concern (IUCN 3.1)

Scientific classification
- Kingdom: Animalia
- Phylum: Chordata
- Class: Aves
- Order: Galliformes
- Family: Odontophoridae
- Genus: Ptilopachus
- Species: P. petrosus

Binomial name
- Ptilopachus petrosus (Gmelin, JF, 1789)

= Stone partridge =

Species of bird

The stone partridge (Ptilopachus petrosus) is a bird of the New World quail family. This largely brown bird, which commonly holds its tail raised, is found in scrubland and lightly wooded habitats, often near rocks, from Kenya and Ethiopia to Gambia (a large part of its range is in the Sudanian Savanna).

== Taxonomy ==
The stone partridge was formally described in 1789 by the German naturalist Johann Friedrich Gmelin in his revised and expanded edition of Carl Linnaeus's Systema Naturae. He placed it with all the other partridge like birds in the genus Tetrao and coined the binomial name Tetrao petrosus. Gmelin's description was based on the Comte de Buffon's "Le perdrix de roche ou de la Gambia" and John Latham's "Rufous-breasted partridge". The stone partridge is now placed with Nahan's partridge in the genus Ptilopachus that was introduced in 1837 by the English naturalist William Swainson. The genus name is from the Ancient Greek ptilon meaning "feather" with pakhus meaning "thick" or "dense". The specific epithet petrosus is Latin meaning "rocky".

Four subspecies are recognised:

- P. p. petrosus (Gmelin, JF, 1789) – Gambia to Cameroon
- P. p. brehmi Neumann, 1908 – south Chad to central Sudan
- P. p. major Neumann, 1908 – north Ethiopia
- P. p. florentiae Ogilvie-Grant, 1900 – south Sudan and south Ethiopia to northeast DR Congo, north Uganda and central Kenya

Some confusion exists in the naming of this species because the name of this bird in many languages translates literally into English as "rock partridge". For instance, in Dutch the species is rotspatrijs, in German - Felsenhenne, in French - poulette de roche - all literal translations of "rock partridge". The bird known as rock partridge in English is actually a member of another genus, Alectoris graeca. The confusion is further compounded as in some languages, Alectoris species are known by names that literally translate as stone partridge. In Dutch, steenpatrijs, in German Steinhuhn; red-legged partridge (A. rufa) being rode steenpatrijs in Dutch. Further complication arises as, particularly within the US, the name "rock partridge" has been used for a variety of Alectoris species and hybrids. The international bird trade, for sport, aviaries' and meat, has led to misapplication of various of these common and scientific names. Alectoris and Ptilopachus species are actually very different in size and habits, Ptilopachus being only 20–25 cm long.

== Description ==
The stone partridge is exceptional among gamebirds in that the female, to human eyes, is showier than the male. Both sexes are predominantly earthy chocolate brown above, with sparse, pale, cream-grey spotting. The head, neck, and chest are paler brown and have broad cream edging to the feathers that gives the bird a scaled appearance. In males, the lower chest and belly are orange-cream; in females, very pale cream. Both sexes raise their crown feathers to form a rudimentary crest, but the feathers of females are somewhat longer, hence more obvious when raised.

Eggs are pale pink, fading to cream; juveniles are dark chocolate-brown throughout, moulting into adult plumage at several weeks old. In captivity at least, the male plays a major role in both incubation and rearing of the young, offering young small items of food by picking them up, dropping them, and calling to the chicks.

== Distribution and habitat ==
Widespread and common throughout its large range, the stone partridge is evaluated as least concern on the IUCN Red List of Threatened Species.

Since 2000, the stone partridge has been imported into the United States and Europe, where it is hoped that it will become established in zoos and bird collections.

== Philately ==
- The stone partridge is featured on a 5F stamp of Ivory Coast.
