= Nahan (disambiguation) =

Nahan is a town in India.

Nahan may also refer to:

== People ==
- Mike Nahan (born 1950), politician
- Nahan Franko (1861–1930), violinist
- Stu Nahan (1926–2007), sportscaster

== Other uses ==
- Nahan's partridge (Ptilopachus nahani), bird
- Kang bed-stove (called nahan in the Manchu language)
