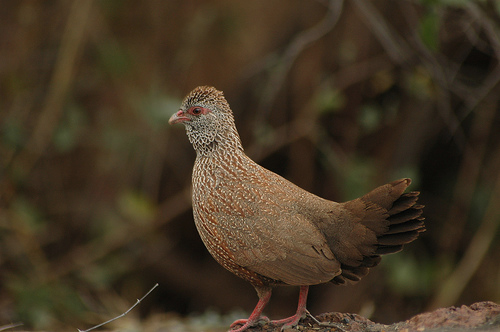
- Stone partridge

Scientific classification
- Kingdom: Animalia
- Phylum: Chordata
- Class: Aves
- Order: Galliformes
- Family: Odontophoridae
- Subfamily: Ptilopachinae; Bowie, Coehn & Crowe 2013
- Genus: Ptilopachus; Swainson, 1837

Type species
- Ptilopachus erythrorhynchus = Tetrao petrosus Swainson, 1837

Species
- Stone partridge (P. petrosus); Nahan's partridge (P. nahani)

= Ptilopachus =

Genus of birds

Ptilopachus is an African genus of birds in the New World quail family.

== Taxonomy ==
The genus Ptilopachus was introduced in 1837 by the English naturalist William Swainson to accommodate a single species, the stone partridge, which is therefore the type species. The genus name is from Ancient Greek ptilon meaning "feather" with pakhus meaning "thick" or "dense".

As traditionally defined, only the stone partridge was included in this genus, but based on genetic evidence, it now also includes Nahan's partridge (formerly considered a francolin). The study also concludes that this genus is more closely related to the New World quails (Odontophoridae) and might be considered their only African representative.

Image	Genus	Common name	Distribution
	P. petrosus Gmelin, 1789	Stone partridge	Kenya and Ethiopia to Gambia
	P. nahani (Dubois, AJC, 1905)	Nahan's partridge	northeastern DR Congo and western Uganda

== Description ==
At about 25 cm (9.8 in) in length, both are relatively small, terrestrial birds with a red eye-ring, base of the bill, and legs, and brownish upperparts.

== See also ==
- Donacobius, the only American species of an otherwise Old World bird lineage
