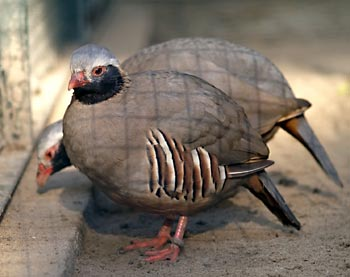

Conservation status
- Least Concern (IUCN 3.1)

Scientific classification
- Kingdom: Animalia
- Phylum: Chordata
- Class: Aves
- Order: Galliformes
- Family: Phasianidae
- Genus: Alectoris
- Species: A. philbyi

Binomial name
- Alectoris philbyi Lowe, 1934

= Philby's partridge =

Species of bird

Philby's partridge (Alectoris philbyi) or Philby's rock partridge, is a relative of the chukar, red-legged partridge and barbary partridges and is native to southwestern Saudi Arabia and northern Yemen. Although similar in appearance to other Alectoris species, Philby's partridge can be distinguished by its black cheeks and throat. Although not currently listed as an endangered species, the Arab Spring and destruction of its fragile habitat in the tribal areas of Northern Yemen had led to concerns about the survival of this species. The name commemorates the British explorer St John Philby.

== Description ==
Philby's partridge is similar in appearance to the chukar partridge and has greyish-brown plumage with the flanks boldly banded in black and pale buff. It differs from that species in having black cheeks and throat, and a thin white line separates this from the greyish-blue head and nape. The beak and legs are pink.

== Distribution and habitat ==
Philby's partridge is found in Saudi Arabia and Yemen. It lives on rocky slopes and scantily vegetated land, usually at altitudes between 4,500 and 9,000 feet (1,400 and 2,700 m).

== Behaviour ==
Philby's partridge is a ground-dwelling bird. It feeds on seeds, other plant material and small invertebrates. The breeding season lasts from April to June and a clutch of five to eight eggs is laid in a nest on the ground. The eggs are pale buff flecked with pink and are incubated for around 25 days.

== Relationship with humans ==
Kosher bird expert Chaim Loike is investigating whether this species is kosher. However, it is relatively uncommon and is never likely to be a main dietary item. It was brought to the United States in the 1980s and is fairly common in aviculture. The International Union for Conservation of Nature has listed this species as being of "least concern" on the basis that it has a wide range and is likely to have a large total population.
