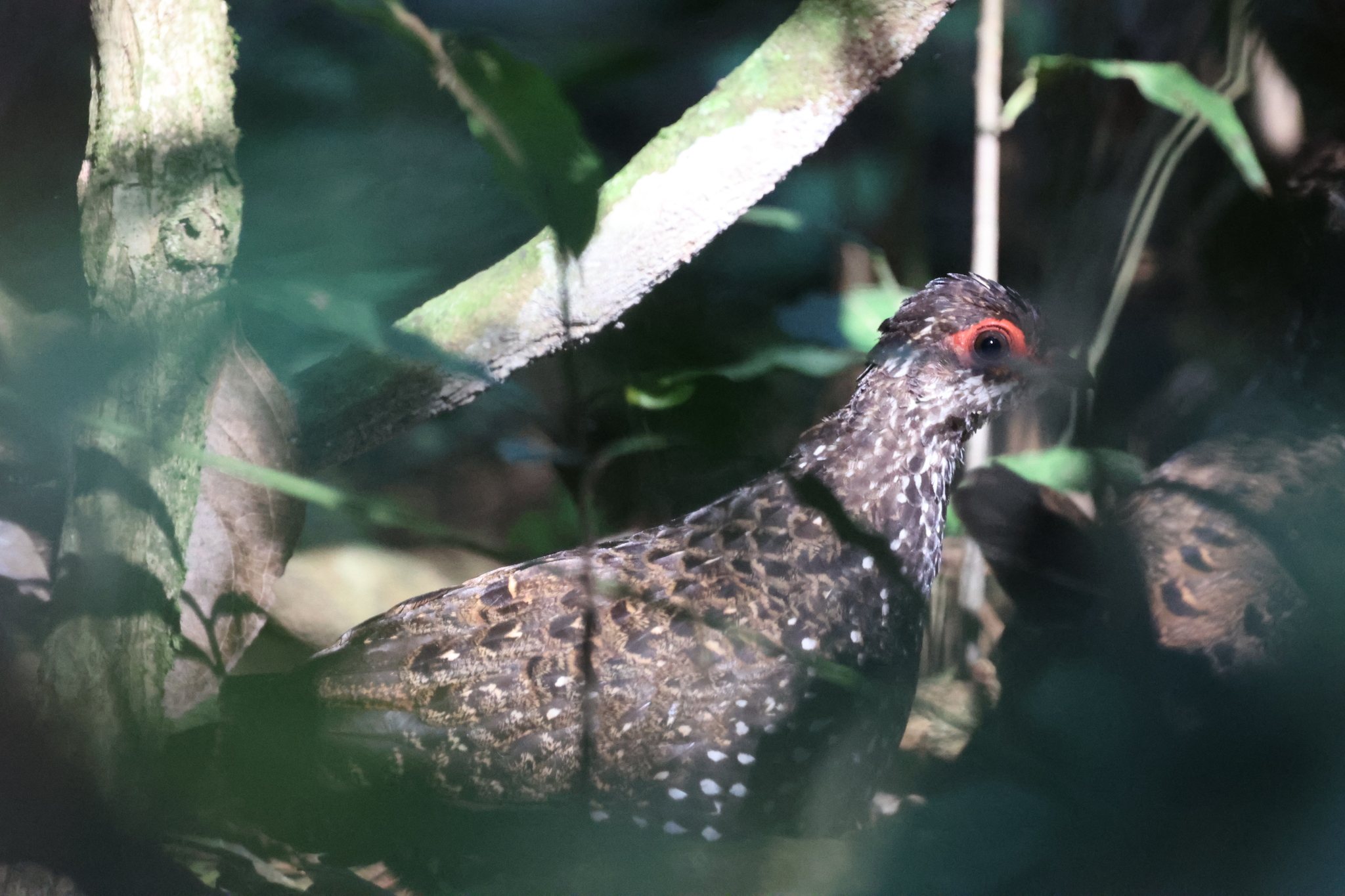

Conservation status
- Vulnerable (IUCN 3.1)

Scientific classification
- Kingdom: Animalia
- Phylum: Chordata
- Class: Aves
- Order: Galliformes
- Family: Odontophoridae
- Genus: Ptilopachus
- Species: P. nahani

Binomial name
- Ptilopachus nahani (Dubois, 1905)

Synonyms
- Francolinus nahani Pternistis nahani

= Nahan's partridge =

Species of bird

Nahan's partridge (Ptilopachus nahani), also known as the Nahan's francolin, is a bird traditionally placed in the family Phasianidae. As suggested by its alternative name, it was formerly believed to be a francolin and placed either in Francolinus or Pternistis, but it is now known that its closest relative is the stone partridge and together may in fact be the only African representatives of the New World quails (Odontophoridae).

== Description ==
At about 25 centimetres (9.8 in) in length, the Nahan's partridge is a relatively small, terrestrial bird with a red eye-ring, legs and base of the bill, brownish upperparts, and black-and-white underparts and head.

It is named after Captain Paul-François-Joseph Nahan (1867-1930), a Belgian mercenary who served in the Belgian Congo where he collected the specimen.

== Distribution and habitat ==
This endangered species is found in the rainforests in northeastern DR Congo and western Uganda, and it is threatened by habitat loss and hunting. As of December 2024, the Royal Zoological Society of Scotland is surveying the species' habitat to update its population count.

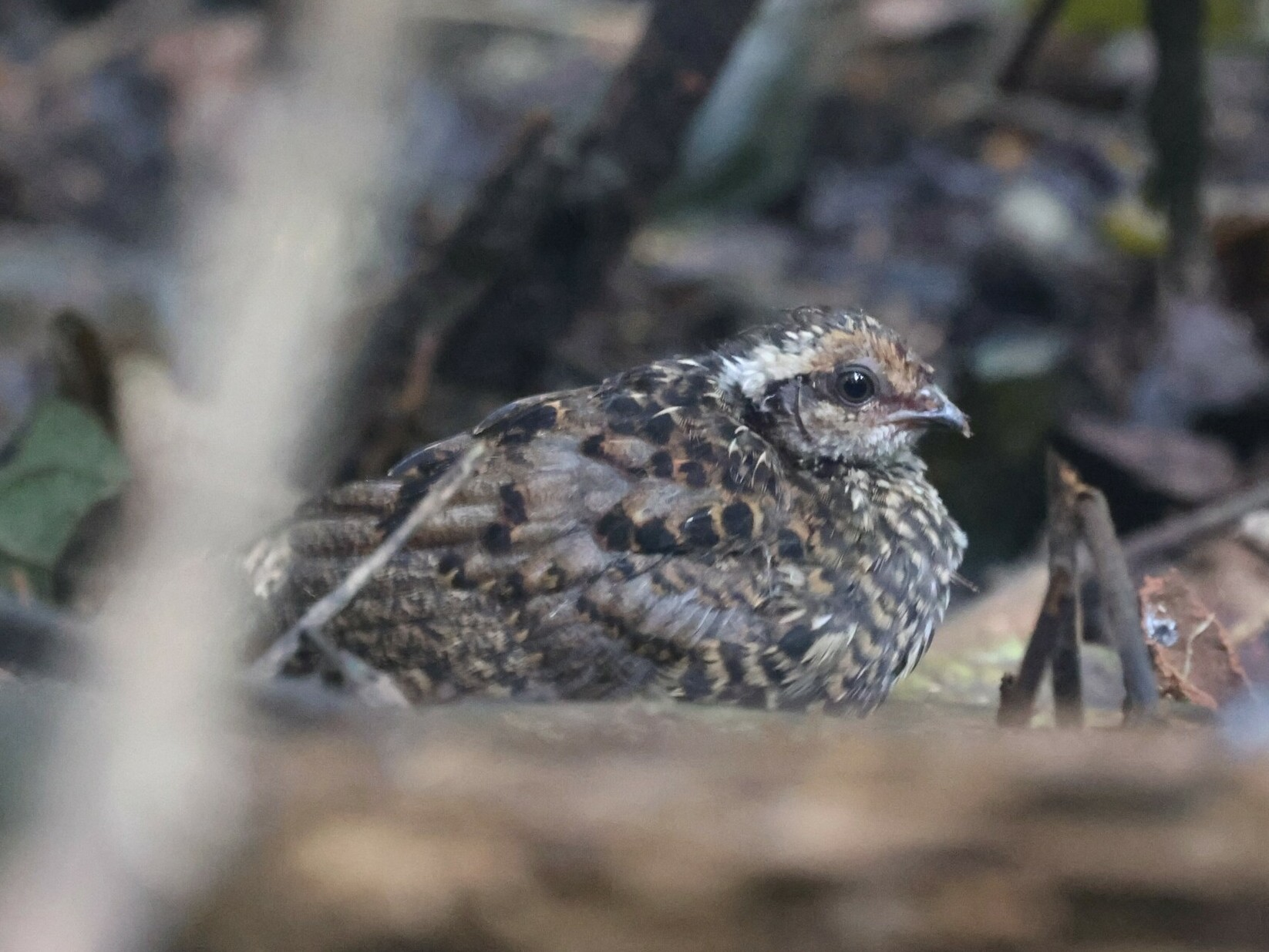
Juvenile

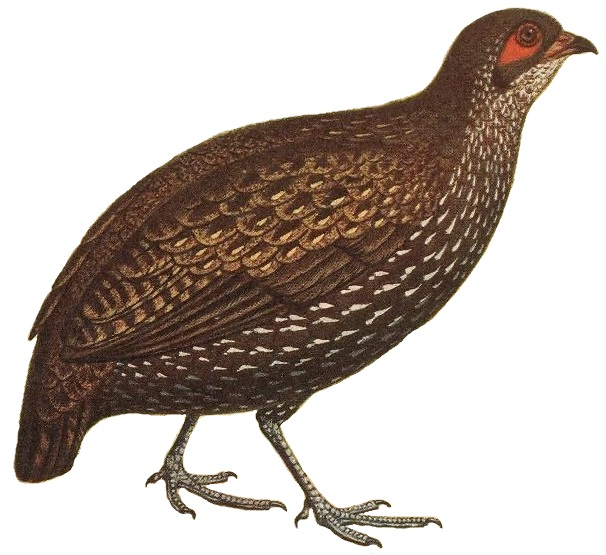
