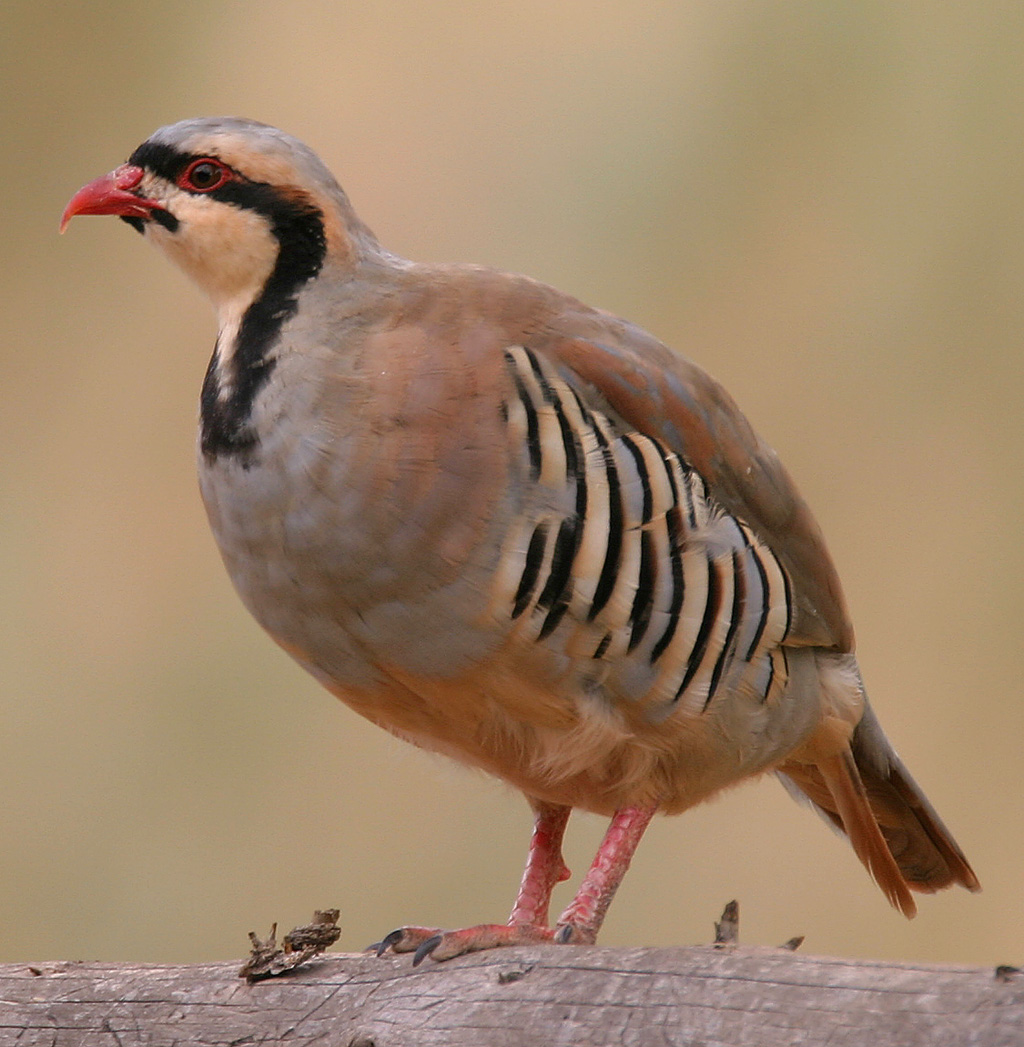
- Chukar partridge (Alectoris chukar)

Scientific classification
- Kingdom: Animalia
- Phylum: Chordata
- Class: Aves
- Order: Galliformes
- Family: Phasianidae
- Tribe: Coturnicini
- Genus: Alectoris; Kaup, 1829

Type species
- Perdix petros = Perdix babara Bonnaterre, 1790; Barbary partridge

Species
- See text.
- Rough distributions of species in the genus Alectoris

= Alectoris =

Genus of birds

Alectoris is a genus of partridges in the family Phasianidae, closely related to Old World quail (Coturnix and relatives), snowcocks (Tetraogallus), partridge-francolins (Pternistis), bush quail (Perdicula), and sand and see-see partridges (Ammoperdix). Members of the genus are known collectively as rock partridges (a name that also refers to one species in particular, Alectoris graeca). The genus name is derived from the Ancient Greek: αλέκτωρ, romanized: alektoris, meaning "chicken" or "farmyard fowl".

Their fossils date back to the early Pleistocene, with extant representatives in southern Europe, North Africa and Arabia, and across Asia in Pakistan to Tibet and western China.

== Taxonomy ==
The genus Alectoris was introduced in 1829 by German naturalist Johann Jakob Kaup to accommodate a single species Perdrix petrosa, a junior synonym of Perdix barbara Bonnaterre, 1790, the Barbary partridge, which is therefore the type species by monotypy. The genus name is from Ancient Greek αλεκτορις/alektoris, αλεκτοριδος/alektoridos meaning "hen" or "chicken".

== Description ==
These are non-migratory birds of dry, open and often hilly country. They nest in a scantily lined ground scrape laying up to 20 eggs. They feed on a wide variety of seeds and vegetation. Ants are a very important source of nutrition for the birds as are pine nuts, juniper berries and lichens.

As is typical of many galliform birds, Alectoris partridges are relatively round-bodied and small-headed. They typically have a light brown or grey back, grey breast, buff belly, and barred flanks. Several species have a whitish throat with a black border. Their specialized flank coverts give them the appearance of being more rotund than they actually are. Their legs are red, with well-developed, ball-peen hammer-like spurs. When disturbed they run very rapidly, often uphill, taking to the wing if pressed. Their wings are long and fairly sharp, shaped rather like those of ptarmigan and spruce grouse, suggesting that the birds sustain themselves in flight over substantial distances to find food. This probably occurs most often during winter.

== Introduced species and hybridisation ==
Some members of the genus, notably the chukar and red-legged partridge, have been introduced to many locations outside their natural range; there are now established populations of chukar in western North America, Hawaii, and the South Island of New Zealand, and of red-legged partridge in the United Kingdom, the Azores, Madeira, and the Canary Islands.

The chukar readily interbreeds with the red-legged partridge and rock partridge. The practice of breeding and releasing captive-bred chukar and hybrids between chukar and red-legged partridge has been banned in the United Kingdom, as it is a threat to red-legged partridge populations.

== Species ==
The genus contains seven extant species:

Image	Common name	Scientific name	Distribution
	Barbary partridge	Alectoris barbara	North Africa, and is also native to Gibraltar and the Canary Islands
	Arabian partridge	Alectoris melanocephala	southern Saudi Arabia, Yemen and western Oman.
	Red-legged partridge	Alectoris rufa	Iberian Peninsula, France, Italy and Balearic Islands
	Chukar partridge	Alectoris chukar	Cyprus, Jordan, Israel, Palestine, Lebanon, Syria, Turkey, Iraq, Iran, Uzbekistan, Afghanistan, Tajikistan, Pakistan and India
	Rock partridge	Alectoris graeca	Serbia, Albania, Italy, and France to Greece and Bulgaria
	Philby's partridge	Alectoris philbyi	Saudi Arabia and Yemen
	Przevalski's partridge	Alectoris magna	China (Gansu, Qinghai)

Two prehistoric species are known from fossils:

- A. peii Hou, 1982 China
- A. baryosefi Tchernov, 1980 Early Pleistocene of El-`Ubeidiya (Jordan valley), Israel.

== See also ==
- Ring species
