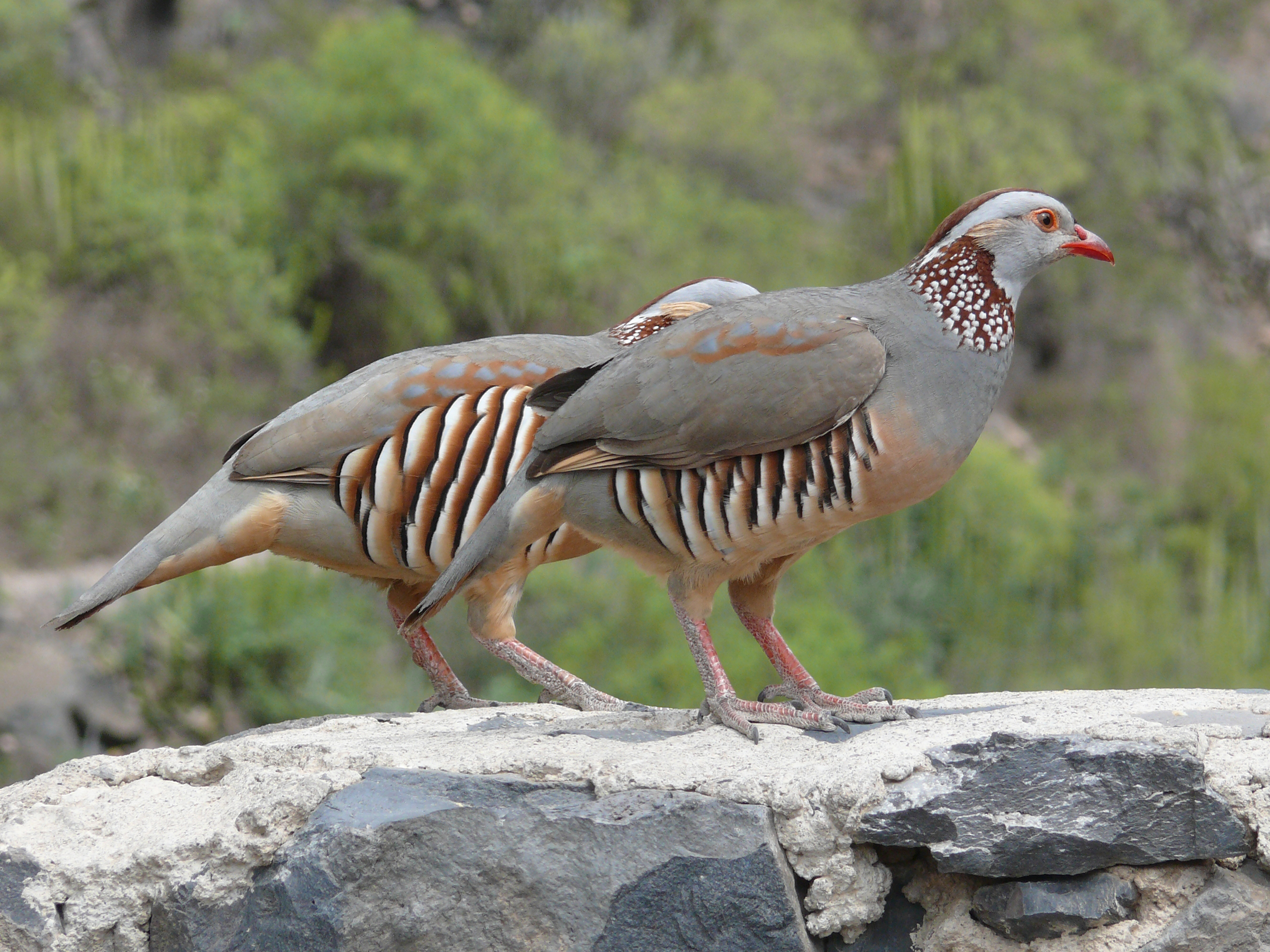

Conservation status
- Least Concern (IUCN 3.1)

Scientific classification
- Kingdom: Animalia
- Phylum: Chordata
- Class: Aves
- Order: Galliformes
- Family: Phasianidae
- Genus: Alectoris
- Species: A. barbara

Binomial name
- Alectoris barbara (Bonnaterre, 1792)

= Barbary partridge =

Species of bird

The Barbary partridge (Alectoris barbara) is a gamebird in the pheasant family (Phasianidae) of the order Galliformes. It is native to North Africa.

== Taxonomy ==
The Barbary partridge was formally described in 1792 by the French naturalist in Pierre Bonnaterre with the binomial name Perdix barbara. He did not specify a locality but this has been designated as Morocco based on Plate 70 in George Edwards' A Natural History of Uncommon Birds that is cited by Bonnaterre. The Barbary partridge is now one of seven species placed in the genus Alectoris.

Four subspecies are recognised:

- A. b. koenigi (Reichenow, 1899) – northwestern Morocco; introduced to southern Spain and Canary Islands
- A. b. spatzi (Reichenow, 1895) – southern Morocco to central Algeria and southern Tunisia
- A. b. barbara (Bonnaterre, 1792) – northern Morocco and northern Algeria
- A. b. barbata (Reichenow, 1896) – Libya and northwestern Egypt

== Description ==
The Barbary partridge is a rotund bird, with a grey-brown back, grey breast and buff belly. The face is light grey with a broad reddish-brown gorget. It has rufous-streaked white flanks and red legs. When disturbed, it prefers to run rather than fly, but if necessary it flies a short distance on rounded wings.

It is closely related to its western European equivalent, the red-legged partridge. It is similar to the red-legged partridge, but it has a different head and neck pattern. The song is a noisy tre-tre-tre-tre-tre-cheeche-tre-tre-tre.

== Distribution ==
The Barbary partridge has its native range in North Africa, but has been introduced to Gibraltar (ssp. barbara) and the Canary Islands (ssp. koenigi). It has been introduced to continental Portugal and Madeira, though there are no recent records of this species on the latter islands. It is also present in Sardinia.

== Breeding ==
This 33–36 cm bird is a resident breeder in dry, open and often hilly country. It nests in a scantily lined ground scrape laying 10-16 eggs. A few cases of breeding in trees in empty nest of African Magpie Pica mauretanica have been documented in Tunisia, probably to escape strong predation on the ground.

The Barbary partridge takes a wide variety of seeds and some insect food. It usually starts feeding and drinking at dawn.

The Barbary partridge is the national bird of Gibraltar where it appears on the 1 pence local coins.

== Gallery ==
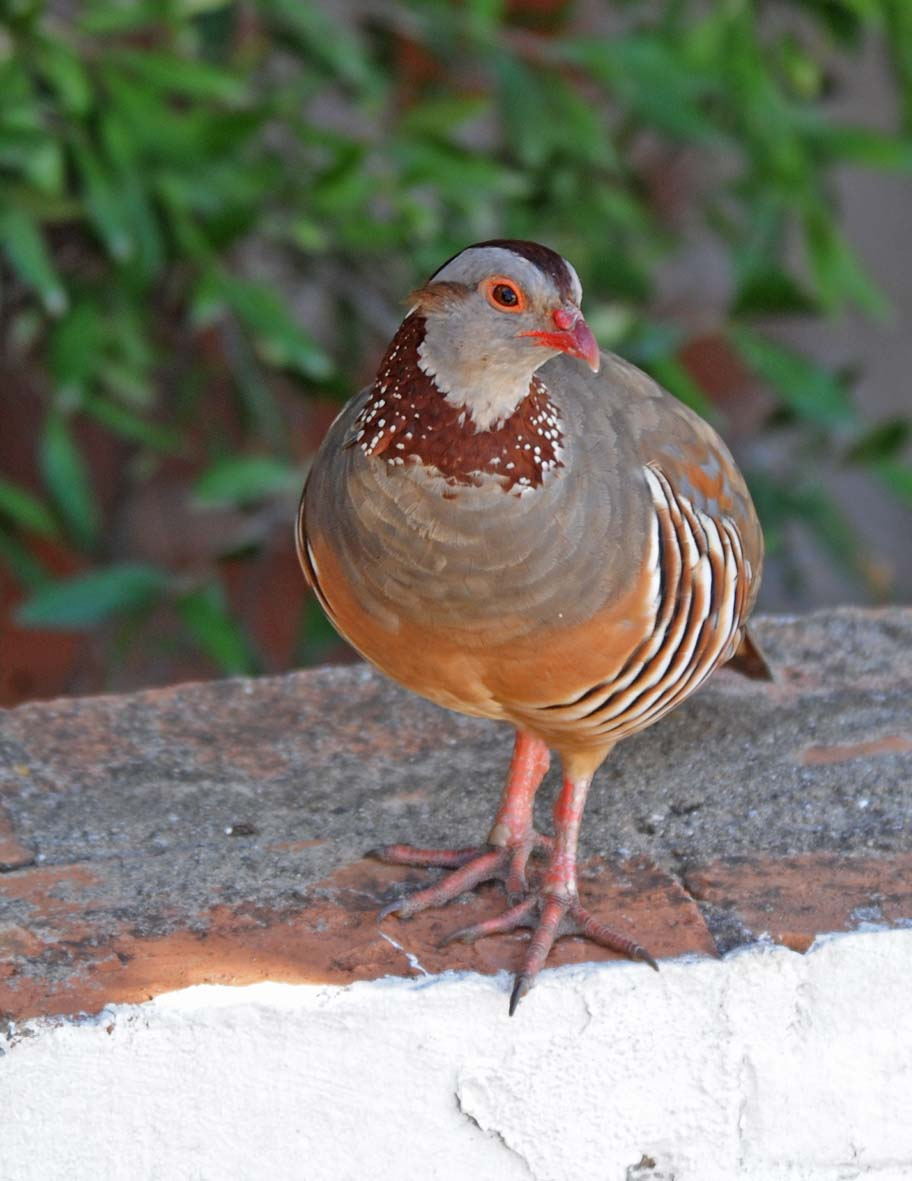
Barbary partridge, Gibraltar

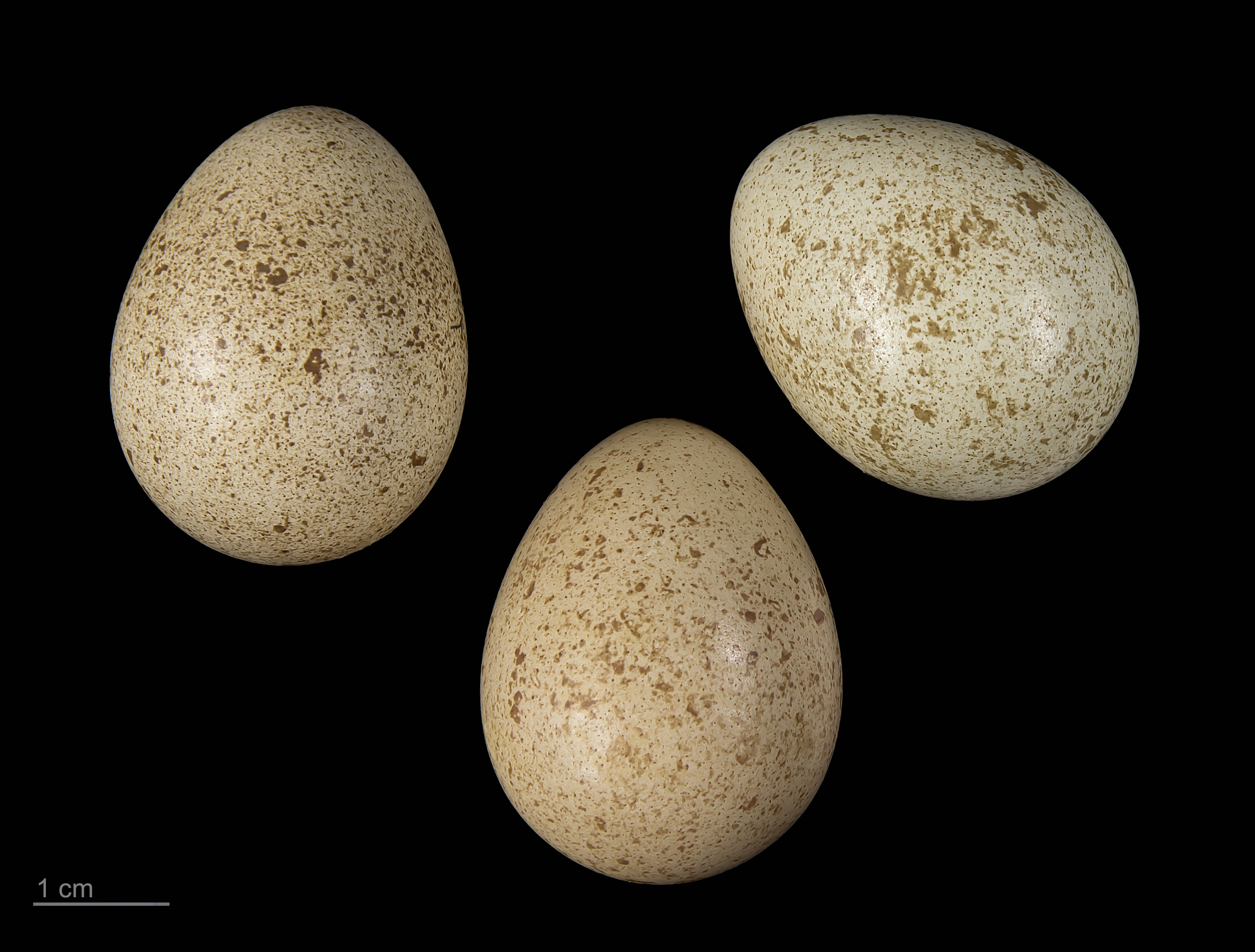
Eggs of Alectoris barbara - MHNT

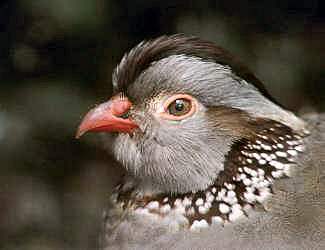
Close-up of Barbary partridge
