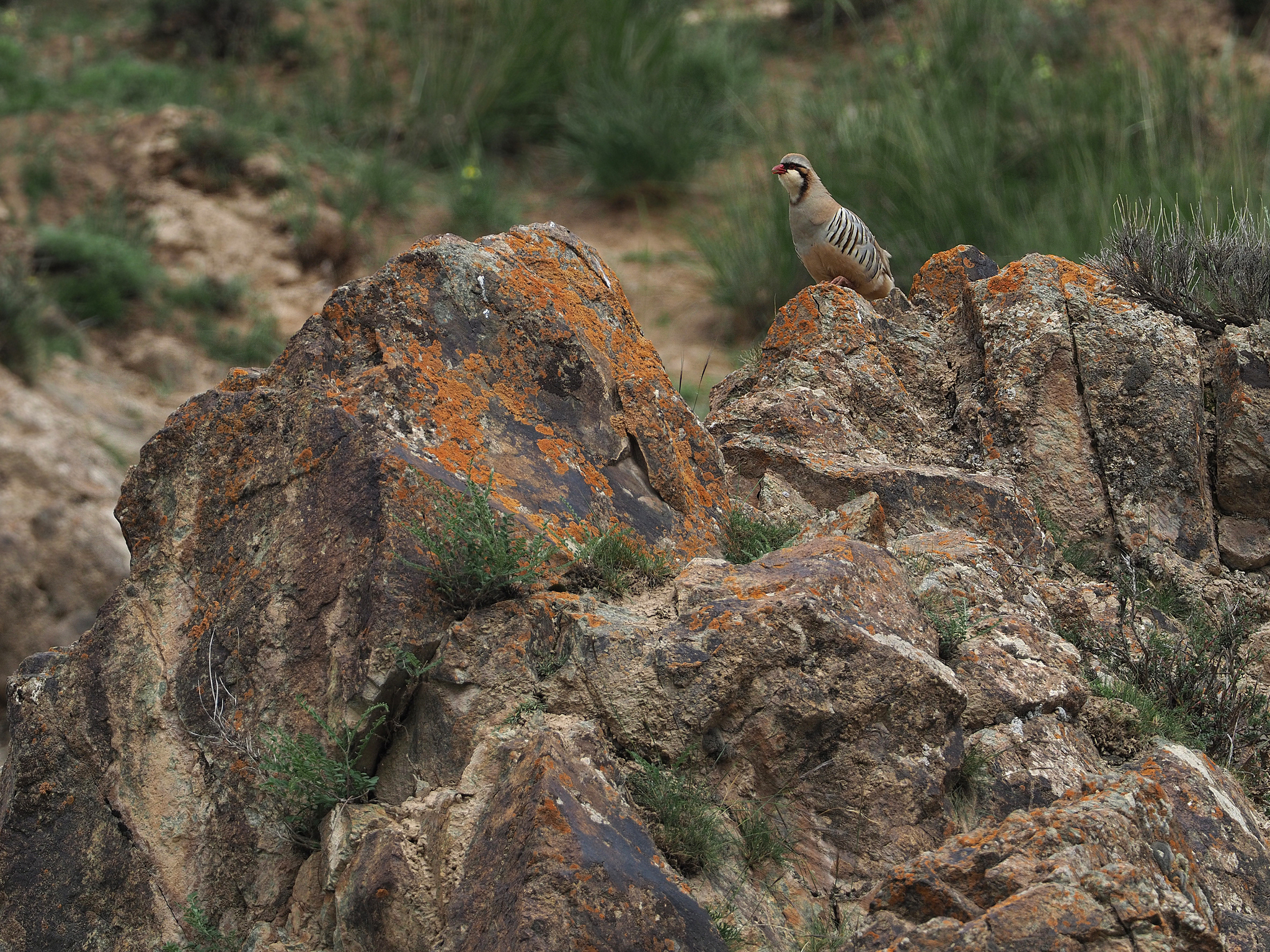

Conservation status
- Least Concern (IUCN 3.1)

Scientific classification
- Kingdom: Animalia
- Phylum: Chordata
- Class: Aves
- Order: Galliformes
- Family: Phasianidae
- Genus: Alectoris
- Species: A. magna

Binomial name
- Alectoris magna (Przewalski, 1876)

= Przevalski's partridge =

Rusty-necklaced partridge

Species of bird

Przevalski's partridge (Alectoris magna) or the rusty-necklaced partridge, is a bird species in the family Phasianidae. It is found only in China.

== Taxonomy ==
Przevalski's partridge has two recognized subspecies:

- A. m. lanzhouensis (Liu N., Huang Z., & Wen L., 2004) - Lanzhou Basin, and central Gansu (China)
- A. m. magna (Przevalski, 1876) - north to northeastern Qinghai (China)

The common name and Latin binomial commemorate the Russian explorer Nikolai Przhevalsky.
