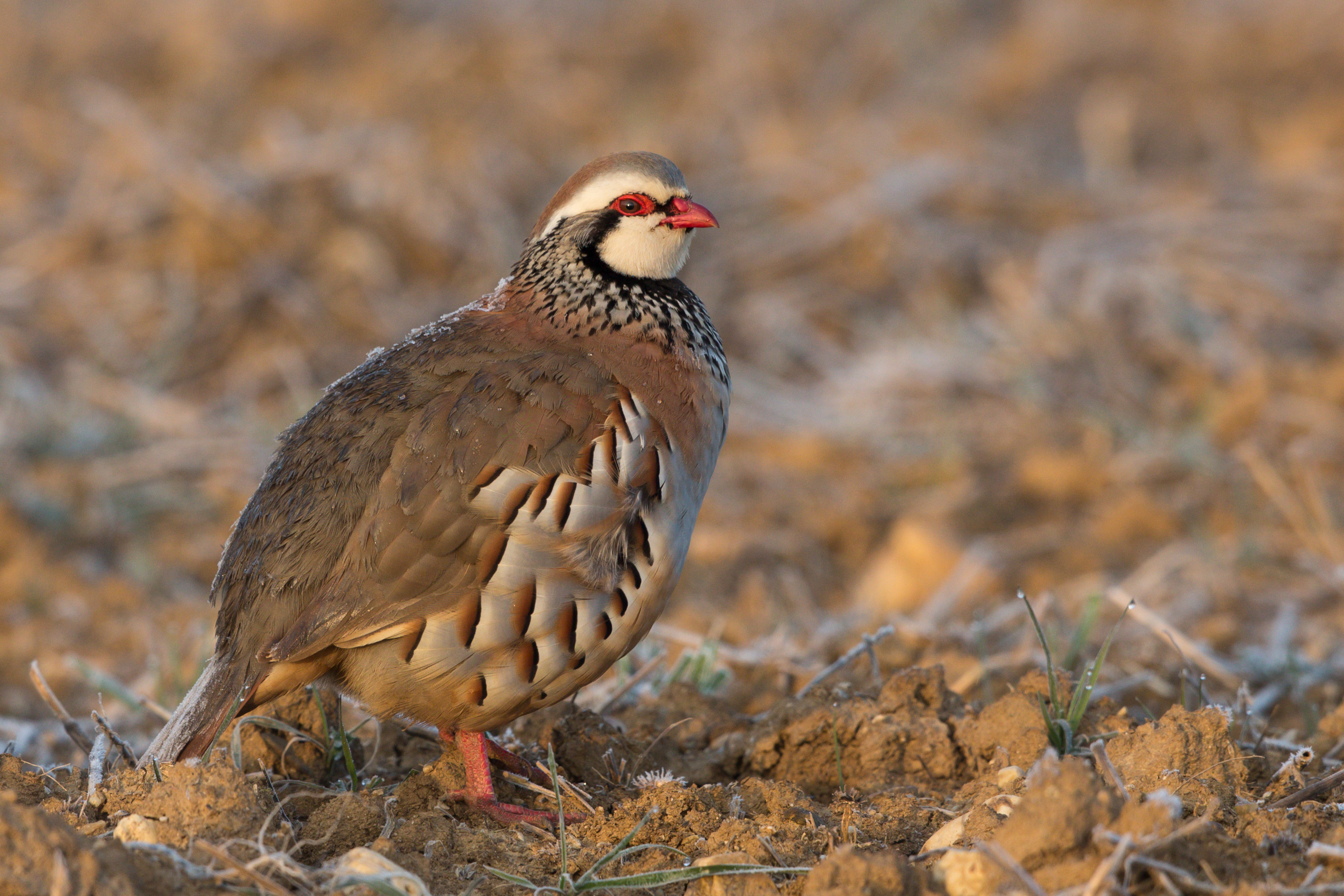

Conservation status
- Near Threatened (IUCN 3.1)

Scientific classification
- Kingdom: Animalia
- Phylum: Chordata
- Class: Aves
- Order: Galliformes
- Family: Phasianidae
- Genus: Alectoris
- Species: A. rufa

Binomial name
- Alectoris rufa (Linnaeus, 1758)

Synonyms
- Tetrao rufus Linnaeus, 1758

= Red-legged partridge =

Species of bird

The red-legged partridge (Alectoris rufa) is a gamebird in the pheasant family Phasianidae of the order Galliformes, gallinaceous birds. It is sometimes known as French partridge, to distinguish it from the English or grey partridge. The genus name is from Ancient Greek alektoris a farmyard chicken, and rufa is Latin for red or rufous.

It is a rotund bird, with a light brown back, grey breast and buff belly. The face is white with a black gorget. It has rufous-streaked flanks and red legs. When disturbed, it prefers to run rather than fly, but if necessary it flies a short distance on rounded wings. This is a seed-eating species, but the young in particular take insects as an essential protein supply. The call is a three-syllable ka-chu-chu.

== Taxonomy ==
The red-legged partridge was formally described in 1758 by the Swedish naturalist Carl Linnaeus in the tenth edition of his Systema Naturae under the binomial name Tetrao rufus. Linnaeus designated the type locality as southern Europe but this is now restricted to northern Italy. The specific epithet is Latin meaning "red" or "rufous". The red-legged partridge is now one of seven partridge species placed in the genus Alectoris that was introduced in 1829 by German naturalist Johann Jakob Kaup.

Three subspecies are recognised:

- A. r. rufa (Linnaeus, 1758) – Britain, France, north Italy and Corsica
- A. r. hispanica (Seoane, 1894) – north, west Iberian Peninsula
- A. r. intercedens (Brehm, AE, 1857) – east, south Iberian Peninsula

== Description ==
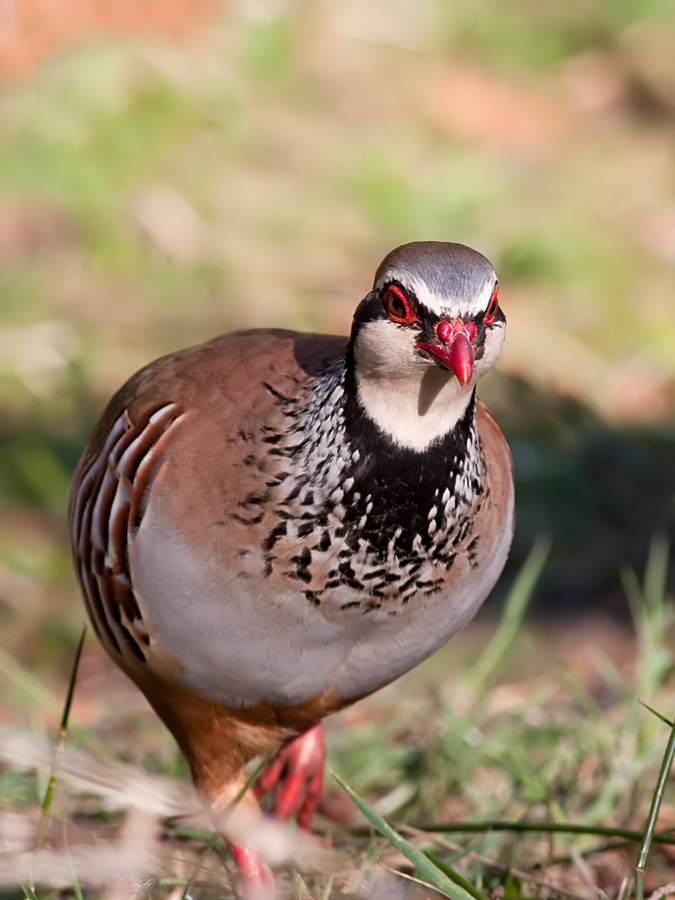
In Scotland

Adult red-legged partridges are sandy-brown above, pinkish-buff on the belly, and pale grey on the breast, with a prominent gorget of black streaking, bold rufous and black flank-bars, a cream throat, pink legs, and a red bill and eye ring.

The crown and upper nape of adult red-legged partridge are a warm pinkish-brown; the fore crown and lateral edges of the crown are pale blue-grey, and the bird has a narrow off-white supercilium running from above the lores to the sides of the lower nape. The lores have a solid bar of black feathering above a patch of pinkish-red skin. This black colouration continues behind the eye, where it broadens, and then extends down around the throat-patch to meet the upper edge of the gorget. There is a patch of pale buff-brown feathering on the ear-coverts, adjoining the black. The eye is surrounded by a bright red eye-ring.

The chin and upper throat are creamy-white, and are bordered behind and below by a solid black gorget. The black colour continues down onto the lower throat as a patch of broad triangular black streaks on a pale sandy-grey background. Similar, but narrower, black streaks are present on a pale blue-grey background on the upper neck-sides, while the lower neck-sides are warm pinkish-brown. The breast is pale blue-grey, and the belly pinkish-buff. The flanks are marked with bold bright rufous-brown bars, typically between eight and ten; each bar has a narrow black leading edge, the background colour is off-white in front of each bar, and pale grey behind. The upper parts are plain, unmarked dark sandy-grey. The uppertail-coverts are similar in colour, and contrast with the pinkish-rufous tail-feathers.

The bill is bright red, the iris is medium brown, and the legs are pinkish-red.

== Distribution and habitat ==
This partridge breeds naturally in southwestern Europe (France, Iberia and northwest Italy). It has become naturalised in flat areas of England and Wales, where it was introduced as a game species, and has been seen breeding as far north as Sutherland. It is replaced in southeastern Europe by the very similar rock partridge (Alectoris graeca). It is a non-migratory terrestrial species, which forms flocks outside the breeding season.

This species breeds on dry lowlands, such as farmland and open stony areas, laying its eggs in a ground nest. They have been known to cohabit with wild rabbits.

== Cultivation and consumption ==
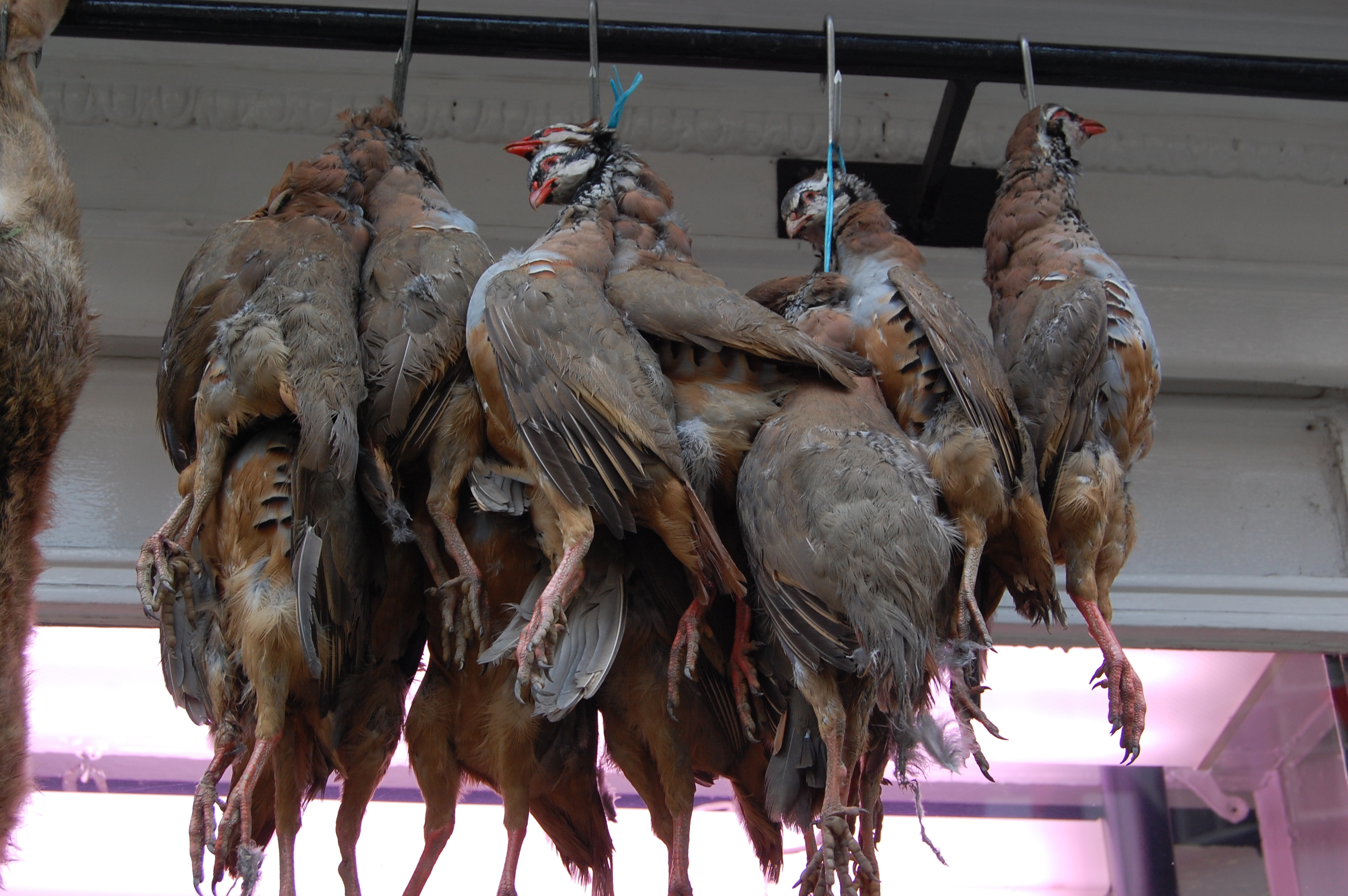
Red-legged partridge hanging for sale outside a butcher's shop in Ludlow, Shropshire, England

Red-legged partridge are bred for shooting, and sold and eaten as game.

== Great Britain ==
The natural range of the red-legged partridge is France, Spain and Portugal. However, it was introduced from France to Great Britain in the 18th century, and has since become an important gamebird there. As it is a mediterranean species, it thrives in hot, dry areas with sandy soil. The ability to breed two clutches simultaneously has led to it being extensively reared in captivity, and released for shooting. The breeding of chukars (Alectoris chukar) and red-legged/chukar hybrids is prohibited, due to its impact on wild populations of red-legs. The red-legged partridge is believed to be in decline across its range.

== New Zealand ==
Many red-legged partridges are kept and bred in captivity in New Zealand aviaries where the population is considered secure at the moment. These particular birds are all descendants from one of the last attempts at introducing the species to the wild by the (Auckland) Acclimatisation Society.

A consignment of 1500 eggs was sent from the United Kingdom in July 1980. However, the boxes were delayed by two days and had evidently over-heated en route. There was further delay in getting the eggs through customs and quarantine clearance. By the time they reached Massey University (which had been invested in to take on the project), hopes were not high and only 135 chicks were hatched. Two further consignments totaling 638 eggs were sent mid-1981. From these only 53 chicks hatched. The plan was to rear these birds and put them through six breeding cycles in two years using controlled lighting and thus establish a substantial breeding nucleus. The programme at Massey was soon terminated and all the birds dispersed to other breeders, primarily the game farm at Te Ahoha which had already produced some young, but some were also given to the Wildlife Service. At the end of the 1983 breeding season, the population had increased to 940 birds.

The current actual status of wild, self-sustaining red-legged partridges in New Zealand is questionable. Back-yard agriculturalists and gamebird breeders/preserves hold most of the population. Some zoos and farm-parks exhibit this species. It is not frequently eaten by the public.

Similar species is the chukar partridge which is not allowed to be kept in captivity and has been naturalized in the South Island as an upland game bird since the 1930s. The chukar partridge's population has been in decline since the late 1980s. Other introduced gamebirds are bobwhite quail, brown quail, California quail, guinea fowl, blue peafowl, wild turkey, and pheasant. Major management efforts are made for the more valued of these species, such as bobwhites and pheasants.
