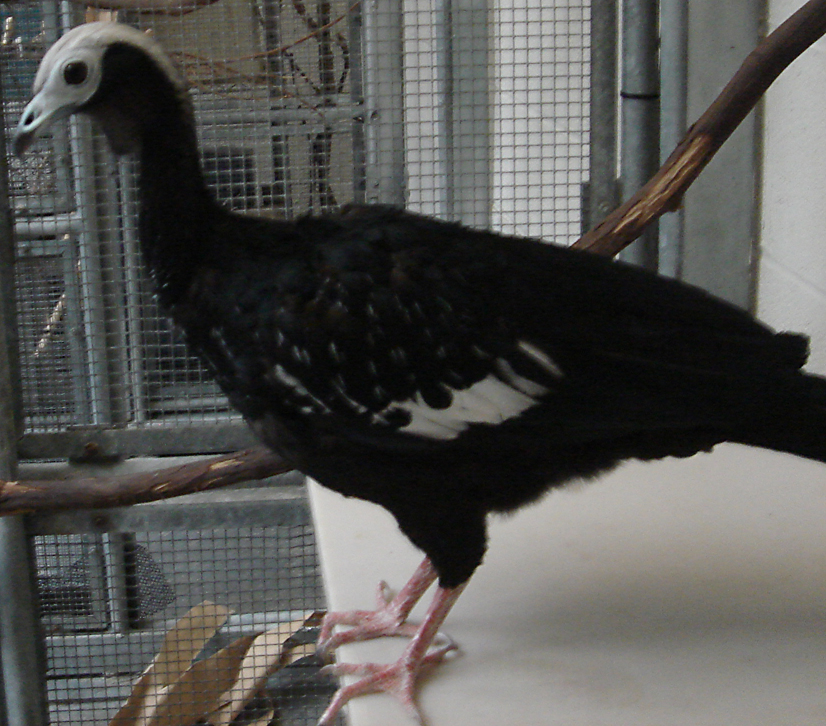

Scientific classification
- Kingdom: Animalia
- Phylum: Chordata
- Class: Aves
- Order: Galliformes
- Family: Cracidae
- Subfamily: Penelopinae; Huxley, 1868

Genera
- Aburria; Chamaepetes; Oreophasis; Ortalis; Penelope; Penelopina; Pipile

= Guan (bird) =

Guans

Subfamily of birds

The guans are a number of bird genera which make up the largest group in the family Cracidae. They are found mainly in northern South America, southern Central America, and a few adjacent Caribbean islands. There is also the peculiar horned guan (Oreophasis derbianus) which is not a true guan, but a very distinct and ancient cracid with no close living relatives (Pereira et al. 2002).

== Systematics and evolution ==
The evolution of the group is fairly well resolved due to comprehensive analyses of morphology, biogeography, and mt and nDNA sequences (Pereira et al. 2002, Grau et al. 2005). The position of Penelopina and Chamaepetes - peculiar genera of which the former, uniquely among guans and more in line with curassows, shows pronounced sexual dimorphism - relative to each other is not determinable with certainty at present, but all evidence suggests that they are the basalmost guans. Their distribution is fairly far northwards, with 2 of their 3 species living in Central America. This indicates that the guans' origin is in the northern Andes region, in the general area of Colombia or perhaps Ecuador; the date of their initial radiation is not well resolved due to the lack of fossil evidence but can be very roughly placed around 40–25 mya (Oligocene, perhaps some time earlier). The two basal lineages diverged during the Burdigalian, around 20–15 mya.(Pereira et al. 2002)

The two larger genera diverged around the same time, spreading mainly southwards all over tropical South America in the process (Pereira et al. 2002). It appears as if the present-day distribution of the piping-guans is much relictual, due to climate changes fragmenting lowland habitat. Aburria were apparently being driven into refugia of suitable habitat time and again during the Late Pliocene by a combination of this and, possibly, competition with the more diverse and generally more adaptable Penelope (Grau et al. 2005).

If taken as a subfamily, the group also includes the chachalacas, but the horned guan is excluded and found in its monotypic subfamily.

=== Genera and species ===
Image	Genus	Species
	Penelopina L. Reichenbach, 1861	Highland guan, Penelopina nigra
	Oreophasis G.R. Gray, 1844	Horned guan, Oreophasis derbianus
	Chamaepetes Wagler, 1832	Black guan, Chamaepetes unicolor; Sickle-winged guan, Chamaepetes goudotii
	Penelope Merrem, 1786	Band-tailed guan, Penelope argyrotis; Bearded guan, Penelope barbata; Baudo guan, Penelope ortoni; Andean guan, Penelope montagnii; Marail guan, Penelope marail; Rusty-margined guan, Penelope superciliaris; Red-faced guan, Penelope dabbenei; Crested guan, Penelope purpurascens; Cauca guan, Penelope perspicax; White-winged guan, Penelope albipennis; Spix's guan, Penelope jacquacu; Dusky-legged guan, Penelope obscura; White-crested guan, Penelope pileata; Chestnut-bellied guan, Penelope ochrogaster; White-browed guan, Penelope jacucaca
	Aburria L. Reichenbach, 1853	Wattled guan, Aburria aburri
	Pipile- piping guans Bonaparte, 1856	Trinidad piping guan, Pipile pipile; Blue-throated piping guan, Pipile cumanensis; Red-throated piping guan, Pipile cujubi; Black-fronted piping guan, Pipile jacutinga
