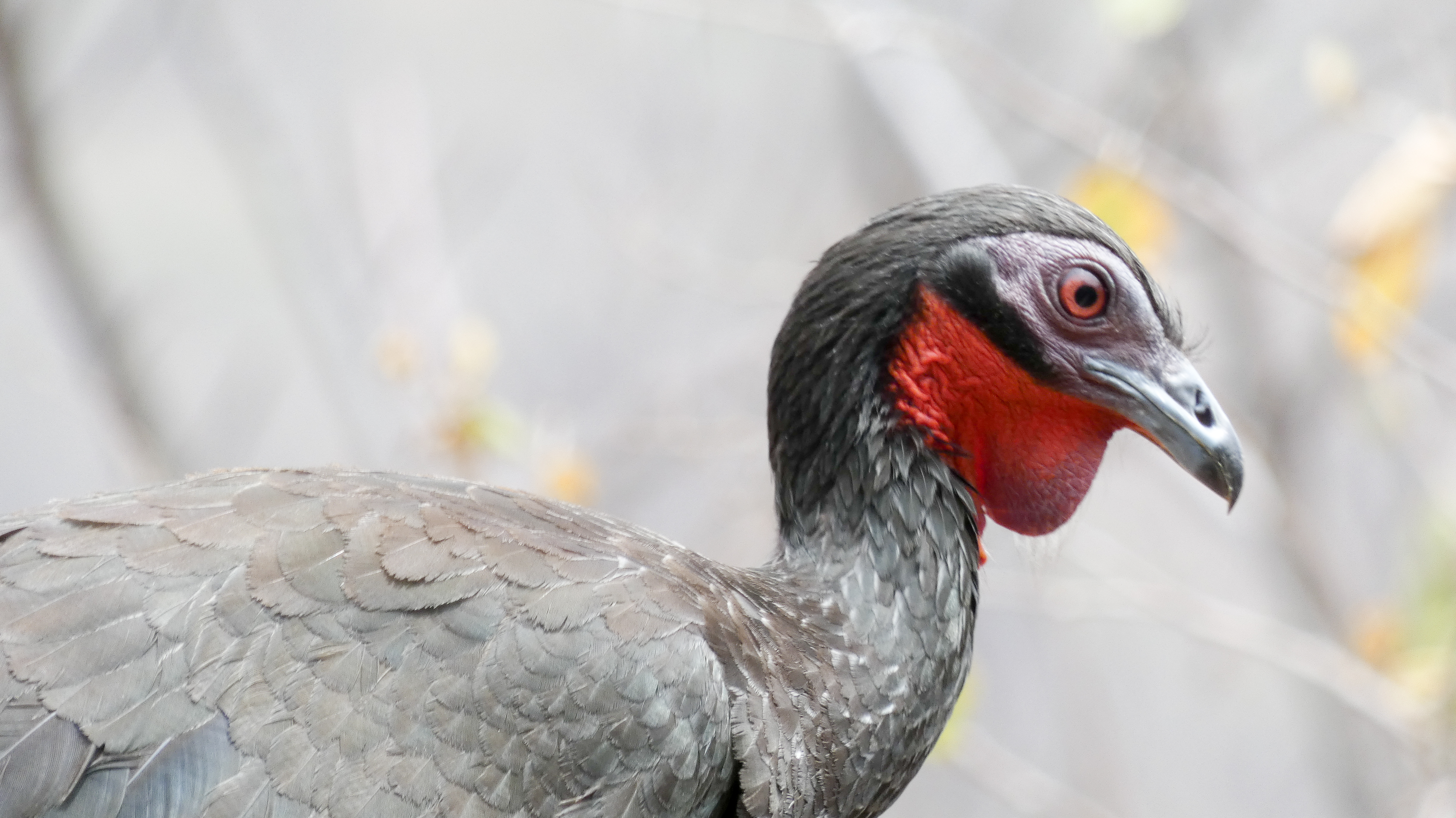

Conservation status
- Endangered (IUCN 3.1)
- CITES Appendix I

Scientific classification
- Kingdom: Animalia
- Phylum: Chordata
- Class: Aves
- Order: Galliformes
- Family: Cracidae
- Genus: Penelope
- Species: P. albipennis

Binomial name
- Penelope albipennis Taczanowski, 1878

= White-winged guan =

Species of bird

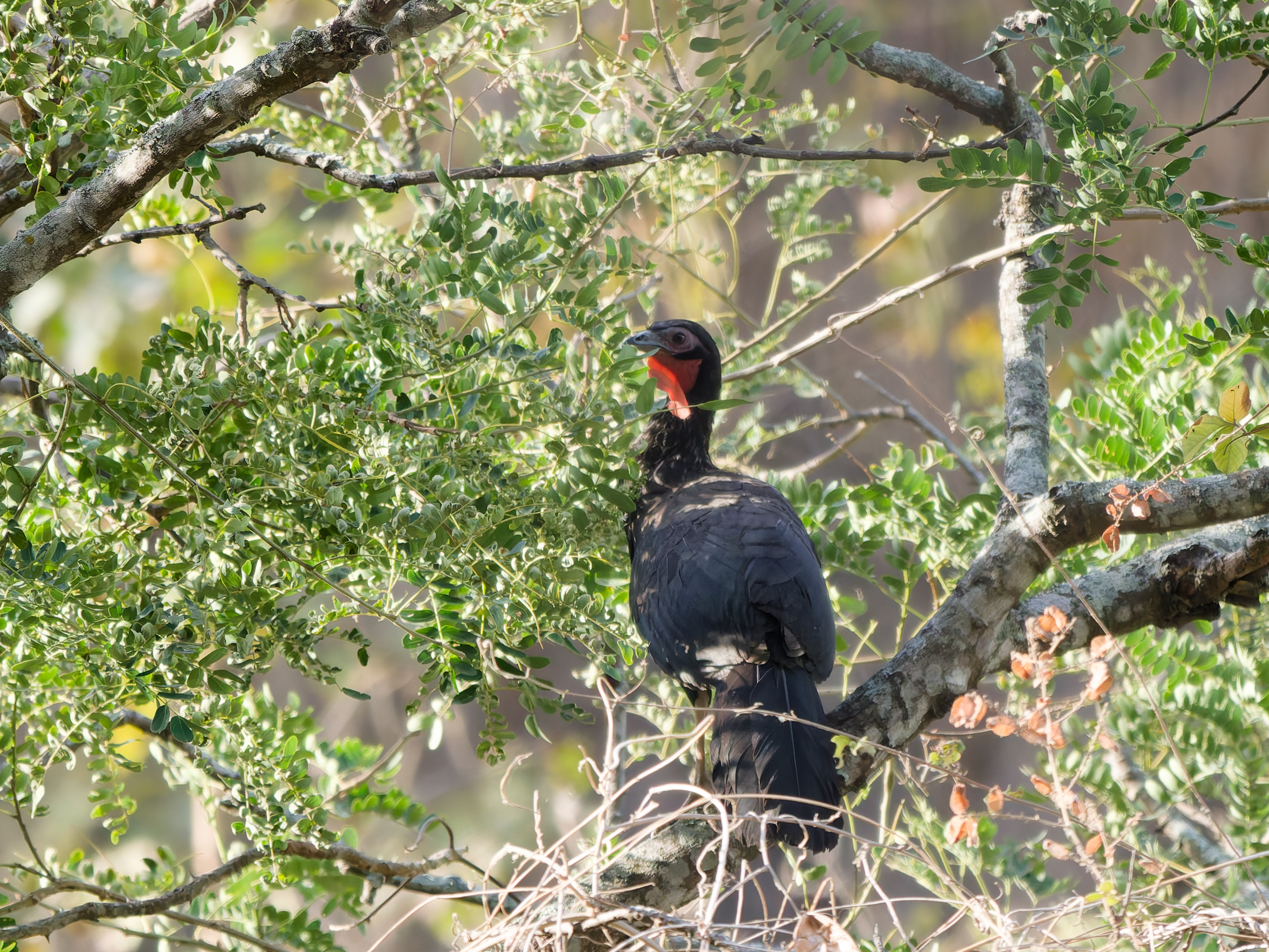
White-winged Guan

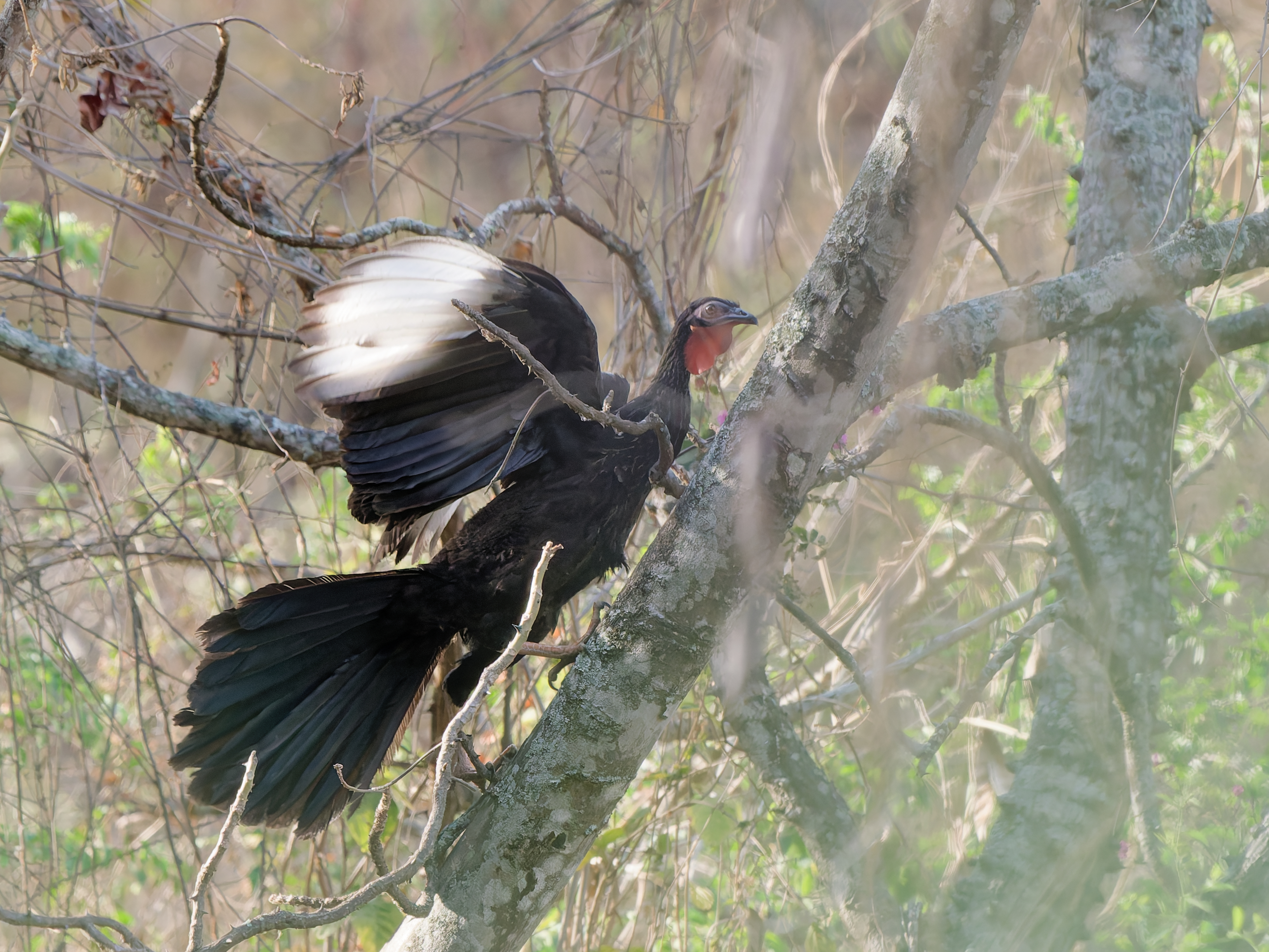
White-winged Guan showing its wings

The white-winged guan (Penelope albipennis) is a bird in the chachalaca, guan and curassow family Cracidae. It is endemic to northwestern Peru.

== History ==
The white-winged guan was originally known from three specimens collected in 1876 and 1877. It was not positively seen again until 1977, though there had been hints of its continued existence in 1969. Surveys from about 1980 on found individuals in many other locations than the 1977 sightings, though still within a small area.

== Taxonomy and systematics ==
At various times the white-winged guan has been considered closely related to the crested guan (Penelope purpurascens), Cauca guan (P. perspicax), Spix's guan (P. jacquacu), and dusky-legged guan (P. obscura). It was also treated as a color morph of Baudo guan (P. ortoni). More recent evidence confirms that it is a species in its own right and most closely related to either or both of crested guan and band-tailed guan (P. argyrotis).

The white-winged guan is monotypic.

== Description ==
The white-winged guan has an average length of 85.2 cm (2.8 ft) and average weight of 1.6 kg (3.5 lb). It has blackish brown plumage overlain by a green gloss. Much of its forepart has short whitish or pale gray streaks. Its white primaries show as a slash on the folded wing. Its reddish eye is surrounded by bare purple skin, its bill is dark gray with a black tip, and it has an orange dewlap.

== Distribution and habitat ==
The white-winged guan is now found only in the departments of Lambayeque, Cajamarca, and Piura in northwestern Peru. It is confined to an area that is at most 190 km (120 mi) long and 40 km (25 mi) wide and is divided by a major road and its accompanying human settlement. The 1876 specimen had been collected much further north than the current known area.

The white-winged guan inhabits a very specialized landscape, small, forested ravines and nearby slopes on the west side of the Andes. In elevation it generally ranges between 500 and 1,100 m (1,600 and 3,600 ft) but has been reported as low as 300 m (980 ft) and as high as 1,385 m (4,540 ft).

== Behavior ==
=== Movement ===
The white-winged guan typically begins calling before dawn and at first light moves from overnight roosts to feed until about 9:00. They are then mostly sedentary until late afternoon, when they typically feed again before roosting for the night.

=== Feeding ===
The white-winged guan is usually found in pairs or family groups, though several groups commonly will feed in one fruiting tree. It eats fruits, flowers, leaves, and seeds. Fruits of Ficus figs and Cordia lutea are the most important part of the diet because they are available during most of the year.

=== Breeding ===
The white-winged guan is territorial and mated pairs stay together over successive years. Their breeding season spans from November to May, a period which overlaps the resource-abundant rainy season. They construct a nest of twigs and leaves in vine-covered trees, typically about 2.5 m (8 ft) above the ground. The clutch size can be one to three eggs but two is the usual number.

=== Vocal and non-vocal sounds ===
The white-winged guan has three categories of vocalization, which are sometimes mixed or merged. They are most vocal at dawn and dusk during the breeding season. The territorial call "sounds like 'jar-jar-jar' ending with a quick 'ha-ha-ha-ha'" and is usually given by the male. The alarm call "'piu-piu-piu' or 'cau-cau-cau'" can be given in duets. The threat call is given as a direct challenge to a conspecific intruder and "sounds like 'arrr, arrr, arrr'." The guan's non-vocal wing-drumming display is given at dawn and can be heard at great distances.

== Status ==
The IUCN has assessed the white-winged guan as Endangered, an improvement in 2018 from its previous Critically Endangered status. Its population of approximately 200 mature birds is believed to be stable. Several refuges have been created specifically to protect the species and reintroduction efforts have helped augment the current six to 10 locations that host the bird. However, habitat destruction and hunting remain as threats.
