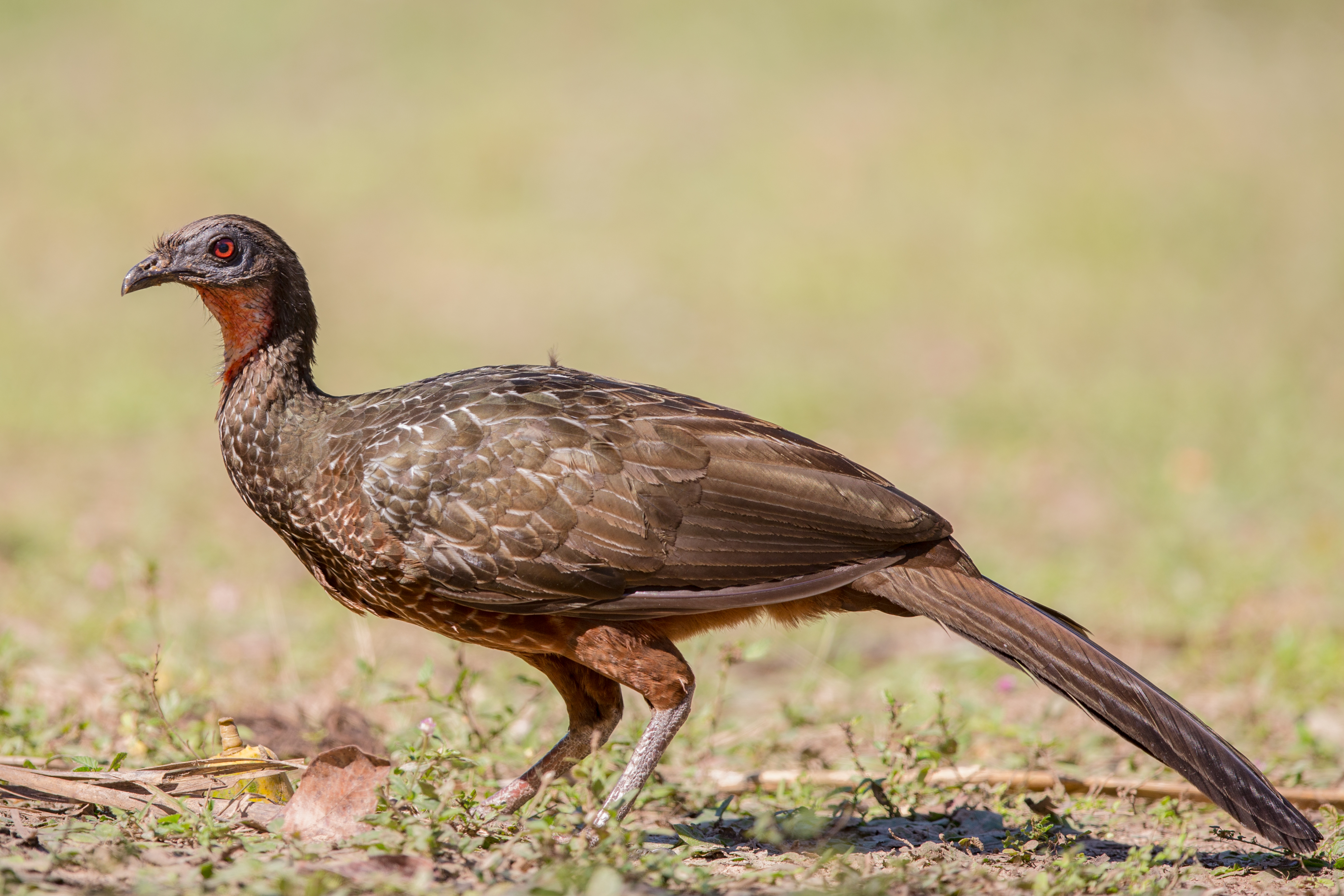

Conservation status
- Least Concern (IUCN 3.1)

Scientific classification
- Kingdom: Animalia
- Phylum: Chordata
- Class: Aves
- Order: Galliformes
- Family: Cracidae
- Genus: Penelope
- Species: P. dabbenei

Binomial name
- Penelope dabbenei Hellmayr & Conover, 1942

Synonyms
- Penelope nigrifrons

= Red-faced guan =

Species of bird

The red-faced guan (Penelope dabbenei) is a species of bird in the family Cracidae, the chachalacas, guans, and curassows. It is found in Argentina and Bolivia.

== Taxonomy and systematics ==
At least one author has suggested that the red-faced guan should be treated as a subspecies of the Andean guan (Penelope montagnii) and others have suggested a close relationship between it and the dusky-legged guan (P. obscura) but later work refuted both treatments. The red-faced guan is monotypic.

== Description ==
The red-faced guan is 63 to 69 cm (2.1 to 2.3 ft) long. One female weighed 1,230 g (2.7 lb). It is rich brown overall with white or silvery flecking on the head, breast, and upper back. It has an obvious whitish supercilium, bare pinkish red facial skin, and the red dewlap that is typical of its genus.

== Distribution and habitat ==
The red-faced guan is found in a narrow band on the east side of the Andes of southern Bolivia and northwestern Argentina. It inhabits the cloudforest of the Yungas region and prefers extensive tracts of large trees. It does occasionally occur in smaller patches or in young secondary forest. In elevation it mainly ranges between 1,800 and 2,500 m (5,900 and 8,200 ft) but sometimes as low as 1,300 m (4,300 ft).

== Behavior ==
=== Movement ===
The red-faced guan is thought to be largely sedentary, but some altitudinal movement has been reported in Argentina.

=== Feeding ===
The red-faced guan usually forages in pairs but larger groups have been reported. It mostly forages in trees but also feeds on the ground. Its diet is mostly fruits and it also eats leaves and arthropods.

=== Breeding ===
The red-faced guan's breeding season has not been fully defined, but displaying and calling pairs have been documented between September and December. It builds a platform nest of twigs and stems lined with leaves and sited in a tree. The clutch size is three eggs.

=== Vocal and non-vocal sounds ===
The red-faced guan makes a wing-whirring display at dawn. Its song is "random-sounding gruff notes, given in level series". Its alarm call is "a loud, throaty and repeated 'kroa, kroa...' interspersed by whistled notes 'luuuii'."

== Status ==
The IUCN originally assessed the red-faced guan in 1988 as Threatened but since 2004 has rated it as being of Least Concern. Though it has a restricted range, it occurs in several protected areas and its generally remote and inaccessible habitat make for less hunting pressure than most other guans receive.
