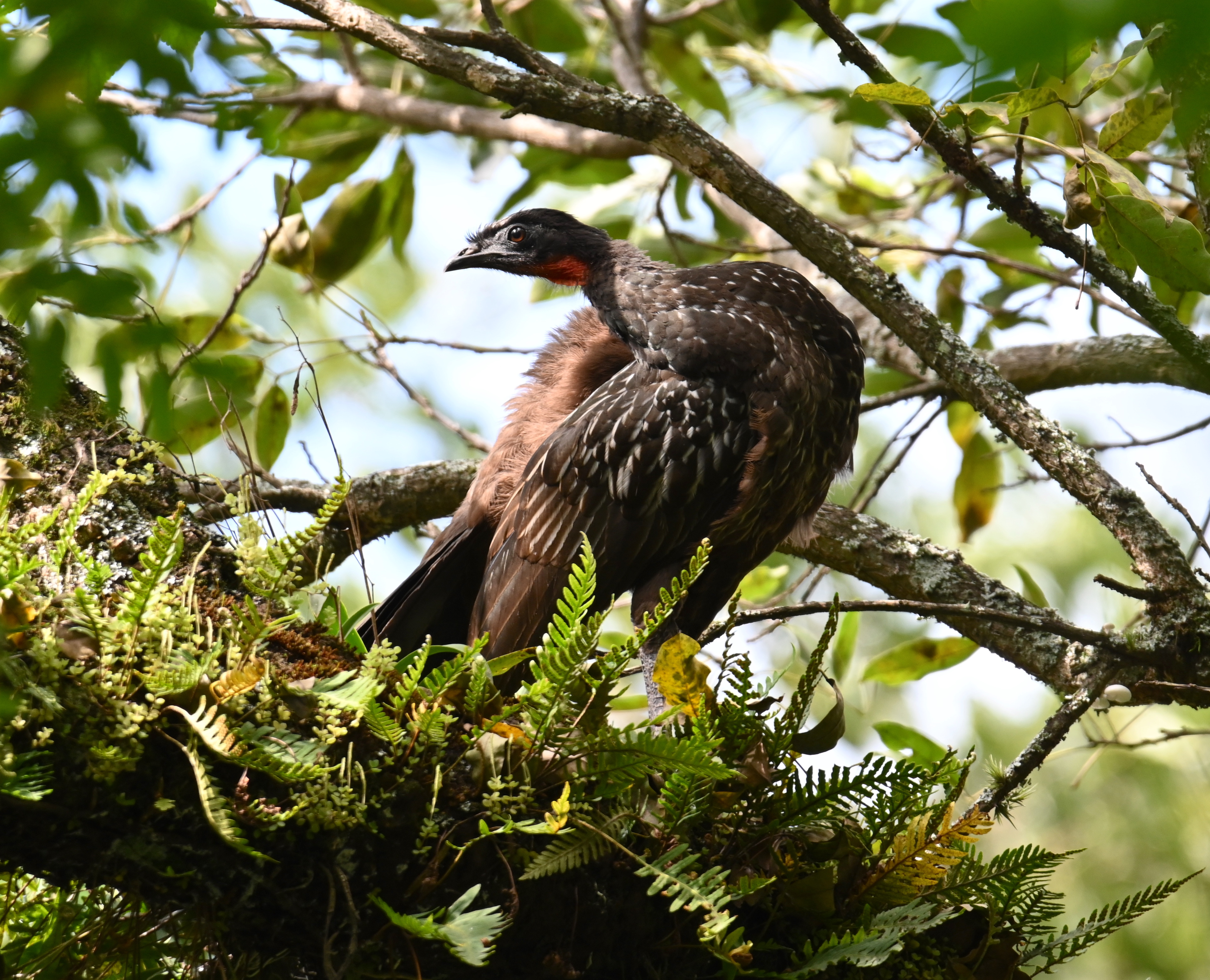

Scientific classification
- Kingdom: Animalia
- Phylum: Chordata
- Class: Aves
- Order: Galliformes
- Family: Cracidae
- Genus: Penelope
- Species: P. bridgesi

Binomial name
- Penelope bridgesi G.R. Gray, 1860

= Yungas guan =

Species of bird

The Yungas guan (Penelope bridgesi) is a species of bird in the family Cracidae, the chachalacas, guans, and curassows. It is found in the Andean foothills of Argentina and Bolivia.

== Taxonomy and systematics ==
Prior to late 2020, the Yungas guan was considered a subspecies of dusky-legged guan (Penelope obscura). A 2018 publication detailed many morphological differences between them. An earlier publication had highlighted their very different vocalizations. Based on that evidence and the members' personal knowledge, the South American Classification Committee of the American Ornithological Society elevated it to species rank in December 2020, and the International Ornithological Congress followed suit in January 2021.

== Description ==
Male and female Yungas guans are alike. They are chestnut above and dull reddish brown below. The belly has brown to orange horizontal markings and the tail is dark brown. The head and back of the neck are black. Feathers of the neck, back, and chest have white edges that are significantly larger than those of P. obscura. The bare skin of the face is slate gray and the wattle is red.

The Yungas guan is larger than P. obscura; the lengths of nine specimens were between 77.0 cm (30.3 in) and 89.0 cm (35.0 in) compared to 48.0 cm (18.9 in) and 66.0 cm (26.0 in) for two specimens of P. obscura.

== Distribution and habitat ==
The Yungas guan is found on the east side of the Andes in the Southern Andean Yungas of southwestern Bolivia and northwestern Argentina. It inhabits subtropical evergreen forest from below 1,000 m (3,300 ft) up to approximately 1,900 m (6,200 ft).

== Behavior and ecology ==
The Yungas guan eats fruit and leaves with the proportions and species of each varying throughout its range. Though the bird is generally sedentary, it is thought to change its elevation in different seasons. The species' breeding season is mainly between October and December.

== Status ==
The Yungas guan's population may be as high as 100,000 individuals. However, the Argentinian Dirección General de Fauna considers it vulnerable in that country because it is heavily hunted for food and sport. The IUCN has not assessed the species.
