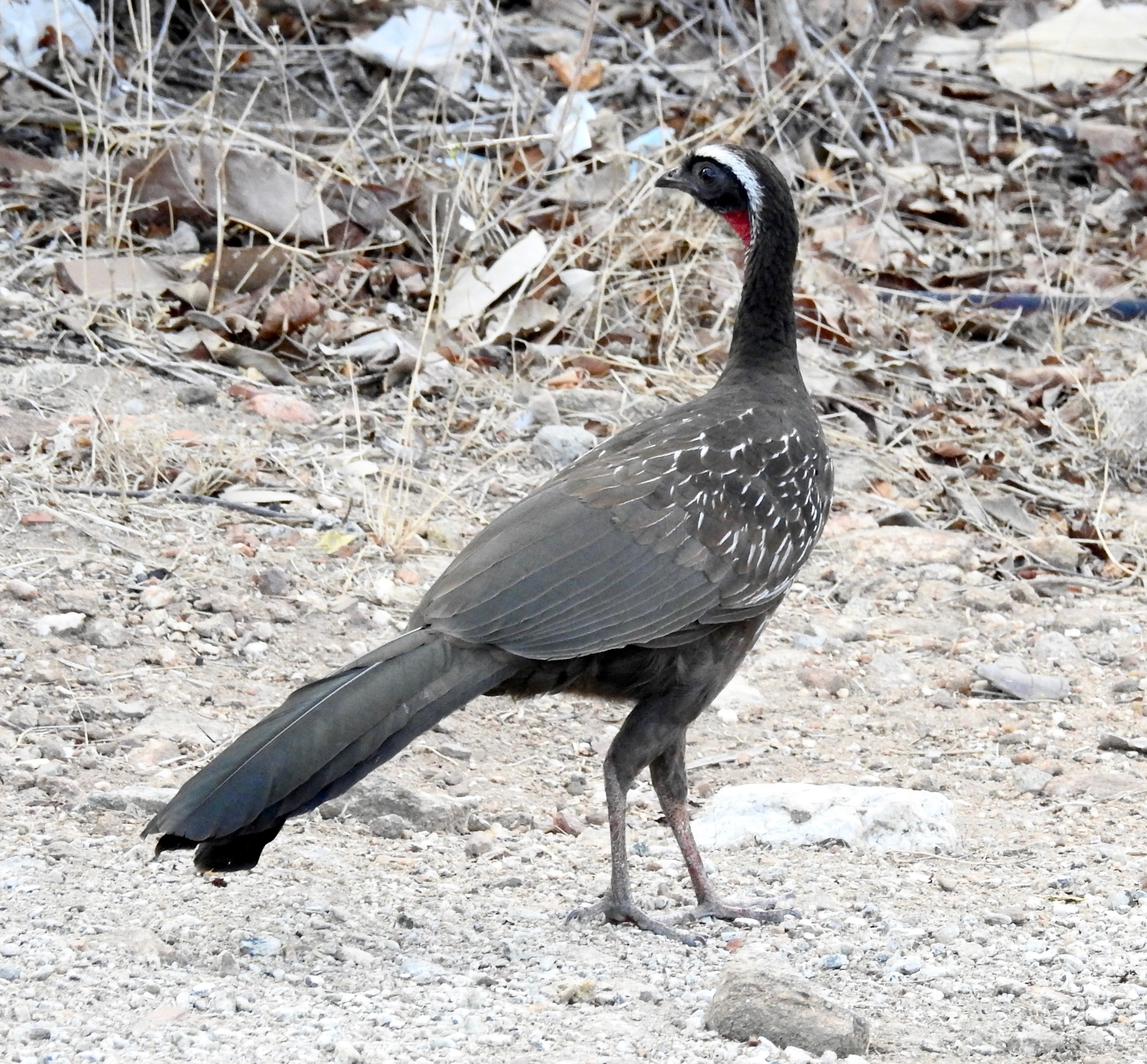

Conservation status
- Vulnerable (IUCN 3.1)

Scientific classification
- Kingdom: Animalia
- Phylum: Chordata
- Class: Aves
- Order: Galliformes
- Family: Cracidae
- Genus: Penelope
- Species: P. jacucaca

Binomial name
- Penelope jacucaca Spix, 1825

= White-browed guan =

Species of bird

The white-browed guan (Penelope jacucaca) is a species of bird in the chachalaca, guan, and curassow family Cracidae. It is endemic to northeastern Brazil.

== Taxonomy and systematics ==
The white-browed guan has at times been considered conspecific with the white-crested guan (Penelope pileata) and chestnut-bellied guan (P. ochrogaster) and also treated as a subspecies of the rusty-margined guan (P. superciliaris). It is monotypic.

== Description ==
The white-browed guan is 65 to 70 cm (2.1 to 2.3 ft) long. It gets its name from the prominent white supercilium, which has a black line separating it from the bare grayish skin around the eye. The adult plumage is overall blackish brown, with prominent white streaks on the upper wing. It has the red dewlap that is typical of the genus. Juveniles do not have the dewlap, their facial skin is yellowish, and the white streaks are fainter.

== Distribution and habitat ==
The white-browed guan is found in northeastern Brazil in an area roughly bounded by southern Maranhão, northeastern Minas Gerais, and the Atlantic coast. It inhabits several dry forest types including open angical, caatinga, restinga, and sometimes campo rupestre grassland. It appears to tolerate some habitat degradation. In elevation it ranges from sea level to 1,000 m (3,300 ft).

== Behavior ==
=== Movement ===
The white-browed guan's movement pattern has not been studied but it is assumed to be sedentary but for short-range travel for food and water.

=== Feeding ===
The white-browed guan typically feeds on the ground in groups of up to seven birds. Its diet has not been detailed but is thought to include fruits, seeds, and insects. It visits water sources to drink.

=== Breeding ===
The white-browed guan's breeding season has not been defined though it appears to include at least part of the rainy season. It builds a nest of sticks lined with dry leaves in a tree or palm. The clutch size is two or three eggs.

=== Vocal and non-vocal sounds ===
The white-browed guan gives a wing-whirring display similar to that of other Penelope guans. It has several types of calls described as "various honking but [a] few raucous or grating".

== Status ==
The IUCN originally assessed the white-browed guan as Threatened but since 2004 has classed it as Vulnerable. Though it occurs in several protected areas, it is not found continuously through its range. Its population has declined due to habitat destruction and hunting and it has been extirpated from some areas.
