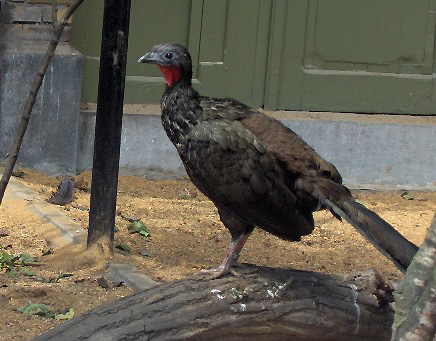
- Spix's guan, Penelope jacquacu

Scientific classification
- Kingdom: Animalia
- Phylum: Chordata
- Class: Aves
- Order: Galliformes
- Family: Cracidae
- Subfamily: Penelopinae
- Genus: Penelope; Merrem, 1786

Type species
- Penelope marail Gmelin, 1788

Species
- 16, see text.

= Penelope (bird) =

Genus of birds

Penelope is a bird genus in the family Cracidae consisting of a number of large turkey-like arboreal species, the typical guans. The range of these species is in forests from southern Mexico to tropical South America. These large birds have predominantly brown plumage and have relatively small heads when compared to the size of their bodies; they also bear a characteristic dewlap. Body lengths are typically 65 to 95 centimeters.

Most of the genus members have a typically raucous honking call. A number of the genus members are endangered species and at least one is critically endangered, usually due to tropical deforestation and hunting. In the case of several species the estimated populations are as low as a few 1000 mature birds, spread over a considerable area. Because of the scarcity of many of the genus members and also due to the habitat being often in deep or high altitude forests, little is known about some of the species habits and reproduction; in fact, some species are found at altitudes up to 3350 meters. Nests are typically built of twigs in trees.

== Taxonomy ==
The genus Penelope was introduced in 1776 by the German naturalist Blasius Merrem who listed two species in the genus but did not specify the type. The type was designated in 1828 by René Lesson as Penepole marail Gmelin, JF, 1788. This is a junior synonym of Phaisianus marail Müller, PLS, 1776, the marail guan. The genus name is from Greek mythology: Penelope was daughter of the Spartan king Icarius and wife of Odysseus, the king of Ithaca.

This genus seems to have originated as part of the southward expansion of guans through the Andes and across tropical South America. Its closest relatives are probably the piping-guans, Aburria. These genera's ancestors apparently diverged some time during the Burdigalian, 20-15 Myr, but this is not corroborated by fossil evidence.

== Species ==
The genus contains 16 species.

Image	Common name	Scientific name	Distribution
	White-winged guan	Penelope albipennis	Lambayeque, Cajamarca and Piura, north-west Peru
	Band-tailed guan	Penelope argyrotis	Colombia and Venezuela
	Bearded guan	Penelope barbata	Ecuador and Peru
	Yungas guan	Penelope bridgesi	east slope of the Andes from Bolivia to northwestern Argentina
	Red-faced guan	Penelope dabbenei	northern Argentina and in the southern border region of Bolivia
	Spix's guan	Penelope jacquacu	Bolivia, Brazil, Colombia, Ecuador, Guyana, Peru, and Venezuela
	White-browed guan	Penelope jacucaca	Caatinga in north-eastern Brazil.
	Marail guan	Penelope marail	Brazil, French Guiana, Guyana, Suriname, and Venezuela.
	Andean guan	Penelope montagnii	Risaralda Department of Colombia, and the Yanacocha Reserve of Ecuador.
	Dusky-legged guan	Penelope obscura	Uruguay, northeastern Argentina and southernmost areas of Paraguay and Brazil;
	Chestnut-bellied guan	Penelope ochrogaster	Brazil.
	Baudo guan	Penelope ortoni	western Colombia and north-western Ecuador
	Cauca guan	Penelope perspicax	Colombia
	White-crested guan	Penelope pileata	eastern Amazon basin of Brazil
	Crested guan	Penelope purpurascens	south Mexico and the Yucatán Peninsula to western Ecuador and southern Venezuela
	Rusty-margined guan	Penelope superciliaris	eastern Paraguay with extreme northeast Argentina, and eastern Bolivia in the Pantanal
