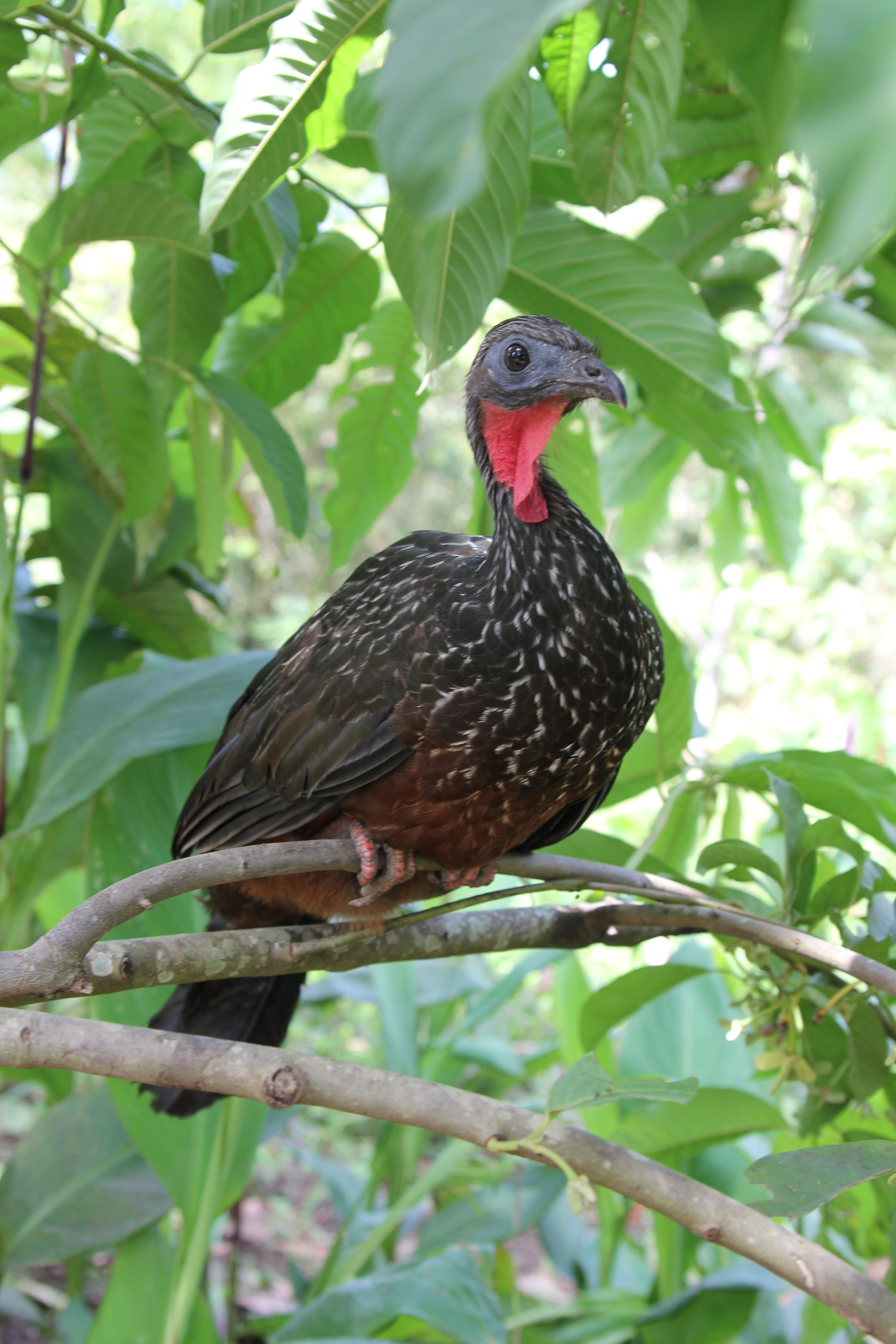
- In Manú National Park, Peru

Conservation status
- Least Concern (IUCN 3.1)

Scientific classification
- Kingdom: Animalia
- Phylum: Chordata
- Class: Aves
- Order: Galliformes
- Family: Cracidae
- Genus: Penelope
- Species: P. jacquacu

Binomial name
- Penelope jacquacu Spix, 1825

Subspecies
- P. j. jacquacu (Spix, 1825) Spix's guan; P. j. orienticola (Todd, 1932); P. j. speciosa (Todd, 1915); P. j. granti (Berlepsch, 1908) Grant's guan

= Spix's guan =

Species of bird

Spix's guan (Penelope jacquacu) is a species of bird in the family Cracidae. It is "the prototypical cracid of the Amazonian lowlands." The common name commemorates the German naturalist Johann Baptist von Spix (1782-1826).

== Taxonomy and systematics ==
Four subspecies of Spix's guan are recognized, "Grant's" guan (P. j. granti) and the "Spix's guan" group of P. j. jacquacu, P. j. orienticola, and P. j. speciosa. It was at times considered conspecific with dusky-legged guan (P. obscura) or crested guan (P. purpurascens). P. j. speciosa was once considered a race of dusky-legged guan, and "Grant's guan" was formerly considered a separate species.

== Description ==
The four subspecies of Spix's guan differ in weight and plumage, and there are intergrades between them. Their length is 66–76 cm (26–30 in). The male and female nominate P. j. jacquacu weigh 1.24–1.36 kg (2.7–3.0 lb) and 1.14 kg (2.5 lb) respectively. The male P. j. orienticola weighs 1.40–1.78 kg (3.1–3.9 lb) and the female 1.27–1.72 kg (2.8–3.8 lb). The nominate subspecies is bronzy olive green above and bright reddish below. "Grant's" is much darker; the upper parts have a blue-green gloss and the red underside is dark. P. j. speciosa's plumage is similar to that of the nominate subspecies and P. j. orienticola's size and color scheme are between those of the nominate and "Grant's".

== Distribution and habitat ==
Spix's guan is found in the upper Orinoco River and western Amazon River basins of Bolivia, Brazil, Colombia, Ecuador, Guyana, Peru, Suriname, and Venezuela. From north to south the subspecies sequence is granti, orienticola, jacquacu, and speciosa. It inhabits both terra firma and várzea (seasonally flooded) forest. In the upper elevations of Peru and Bolivia it is in cloud forest and at lower elevations it is in humid rainforest. The species is assumed to be sedentary.

== Behavior and ecology ==
=== Breeding ===
The timing of Spix's guan's breeding varies geographically; examples include from January to May in Venezuela and August and September in Peru. The one nest that has been described was made of leaves and placed about 5 m (16 ft) up in a tree. The incubation and fledging periods are not known.

=== Diet and feeding ===
Spix's guan forages singly or in small family groups, mostly from the middle to the tops of trees but in some regions on the ground. Its diet is mainly fruits and seeds though it has also been reported to follow army ants to take arthropods.

== Status ==
The IUCN has rated Spix's guan as being of Least Concern. Its estimated global range spans approximately 5.9 million km^{2} (2.3 million mi^{2}) and it is common in at least parts of this range. However, the total population is unknown and is thought to be decreasing. The species is widely hunted for food.
