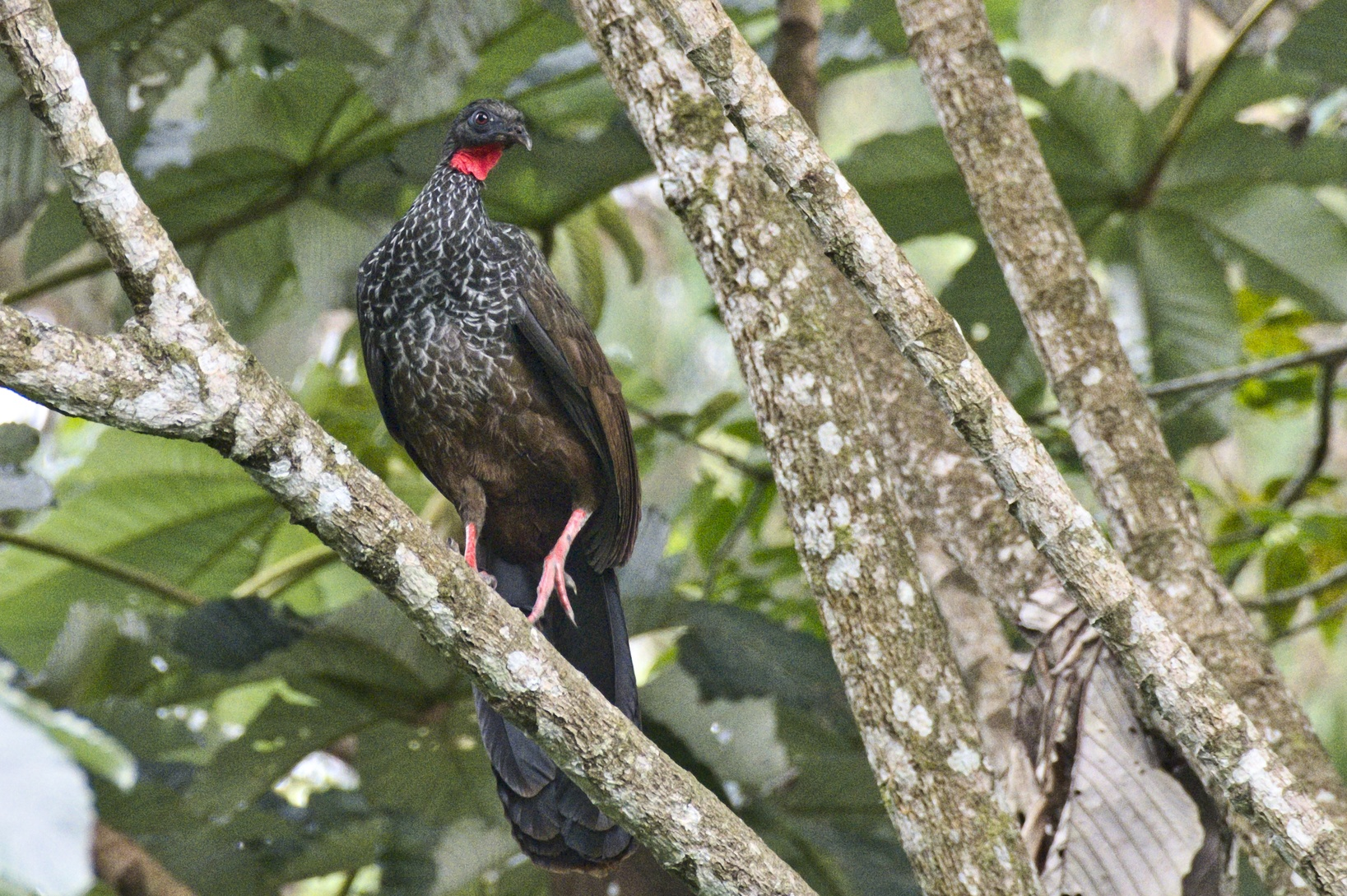

Conservation status
- Vulnerable (IUCN 3.1)

Scientific classification
- Kingdom: Animalia
- Phylum: Chordata
- Class: Aves
- Order: Galliformes
- Family: Cracidae
- Genus: Penelope
- Species: P. perspicax

Binomial name
- Penelope perspicax Bangs, 1911

= Cauca guan =

Species of bird

The Cauca guan (Penelope perspicax) is a bird in the chachalaca, guan and curassow family, Cracidae. It is a large guan, and like most guans leads a mostly arboreal life in humid forests, where it forages for fruit and leaves. The Cauca guan is endemic to Colombia's Cauca River valley.

In Spanish the bird is called pava caucana.

== Taxonomy and systematics ==
The bird was first formally described in 1911 by the American ornithologist Outram Bangs, based on the type specimen collected on 5 June 1908 by Mervin G. Palmer at San Luis in the Bitaco Valley of western Colombia. All four of the major taxonomic authorities recognize Cauca guan as a species.

The genus name Penelope derives from the Ancient Greek penelops - a type of duck which was said to have rescued Penelope after she was thrown into the sea. The species epithet perspicax is Latin for sharp-sighted.

The species is monotypic - no subspecies are recognized.

== Description ==
These are large birds, measuring c.75–85 cm in length, with the typical plump body, long tail and small head of the Cracidae species. The head, neck and mantle of the Cauca guan are dark grey, blending into the reddish chestnut colour of the rump, scapulars, wing coverts and upper tail surfaces. The primary flight feathers are greyish-brown. The undersides of the tail feathers are grey. The grey feathers of the mantle, throat, breast and belly are outlined in white, creating a scaled appearance. The bird has a prominent bright red gular sac which is larger than that of the Andean guan, a possible confusion species. The tarsi and feet are red, as are the eyes. The bill is dark grey.

== Distribution and habitat ==
The Cauca guan is endemic to Colombia. Historically it was found in the Cauca River valley between Quindío Department and Cerro Munchique in Cauca, and on the Pacific slope of the Cordillera Occidental (Western Andes) in Valle del Cauca and Cauca. It may also have been present at the headwaters of the Magdalena River. By the 1980s it was thought to be extinct, but small surviving populations have since been found within the departments of Cauca, Valle del Cauca, Quindío and Risaralda.

The altitudinal range of the Cauca guan is between 900 and 2500 metres above sea level. It inhabits humid primary and secondary forest, forest edges and tree plantations, including plantations of introduced species such as Fraxinus sinensis (Chinese ash) and Pinus patula (patula pine).

== Behaviour and ecology ==
=== Food and feeding ===
Cauca guans forage for food in shrubs and trees, typically between 2 and 20m above the surface. Most foraging activities are carried out by solitary birds or family groups of 3–4, though occasionally groups of up to 30 individuals gather. They primarily dine on fruit and to a lesser degree on leaves and flowers. They are generalist feeders: one study identified that these guans consumed 89 species of fruit, 11 species of flower and 11 species of leaves. Most fruits are eaten whole, though they will bite pieces off of larger fruits such as those of as Ficus cuatrecasana (Higuerón), Solanum sycophanta (Tachuelo) and Cecropia telealba.

In periods when fruit is scarce (September to December) they have been observed feeding heavily on young leaves of Chinese ash, an introduced species.

Cauca guans also search for invertebrate prey on the ground. Groups of 3-7 birds have been observed following swarms of Army ants (Labidus praedator) for extended periods, feasting on the invertebrates that flee from the advancing swarm.

These guans have been observed foraging with other species, including sickle-winged guan, Red-ruffed fruitcrow, Andean cock-of-the-rock, Inca jay, Crimson-rumped toucanet, and Emerald toucanet, as well as smaller birds and mammals. Cauca guans do not seem to be aggressive with or show territorial behaviour towards these other species, but they will defend a good food source from other cauca guans.

=== Breeding ===
The reproduction season varies according to environmental conditions and food availability. In the Otún Quimbaya Fauna and Flora Sanctuary (Santuario de Fauna y Flora Otún Quimbaya) breeding runs from January to June, coinciding with periods where fruit is most abundant, although active nests have been found as early as December. In the Yotoco area breeding seems to occur at the end of the year.

Few nests have been described, but it seems they are typically constructed out of dry leaves and twigs and located 1-2m above ground in trees or shrubs. One nest found in the Yotoco Forest Nature Reserve was described as "not very elaborate". It was built in a thicket of ferns about 1m above ground. The nest was a circular construction consisting of twigs and dry fern fronds, with external dimensions of 34 cm diameter and 25 cm depth. Two large white eggs weighing between 94 and 96 g were found. (For comparison an extra-large chicken egg weighs approximately 64g). The eggs are incubated only by the females. A clutch size of 2-3 eggs seems to be typical, based on observations of adult couples with one, two or three juveniles.

=== Sounds and vocalizations ===
The Cauca guan has a repertoire of several calls: a squawking alarm call which is repeated in a rapid series, a long drawn-out call likened to "kōō'EEl", and a loud wing-rattling which is often heard in the morning and also seems to be part of courtship rituals.

== Status ==
The Cauca guan is a vulnerable species and is included in the IUCN Red List and the Colombian Red Book (Libro rojo). While it was originally found in an area of 24,900 km^{2}, it is now restricted to four discontinuous sites totalling 750 km^{2}. Estimates of the total population range from 2,500 to less than 1,000 adult birds, with only one population being larger than 250 adults.

=== Threats ===
The principal threat is the isolation of the species into small relict populations due to deforestation and habitat fragmentation. The areas where the bird is known to survive are surrounded by large expanses of deforested land so there is no potential for the populations to grow beyond the carrying capacity of these fragments.

These few small populations are at risk from hunting and poaching. Large birds are attractive sources of meat and the Cauca guan being both large and vocal can be relatively easy to find. One study concluded that up to 100 birds are killed annually in and around the main population nucleus in the Risaralda-Quindío area. The smaller populations in some of the other forest fragments are particularly at risk of extirpation due to hunting.

=== Conservation efforts ===
The two largest population remnants are inside protected areas (PNR Ucumarí/SFF Otún Quimbaya, and the Bosque de Yotoco Natural Reserve). These populations appear to have stabilized and are not expected to decline.

A conservation plan was published in 2005, and populations are being monitored. In the Yotoco forest the monitoring is conducted by university students and volunteers, which is thought to be more sustainable than one conducted by professional biologists.

The Cali Zoo operates a captive breeding programme for Cauca guan, which will be useful should there be an opportunity to reintroduce the species into suitable habitat.
