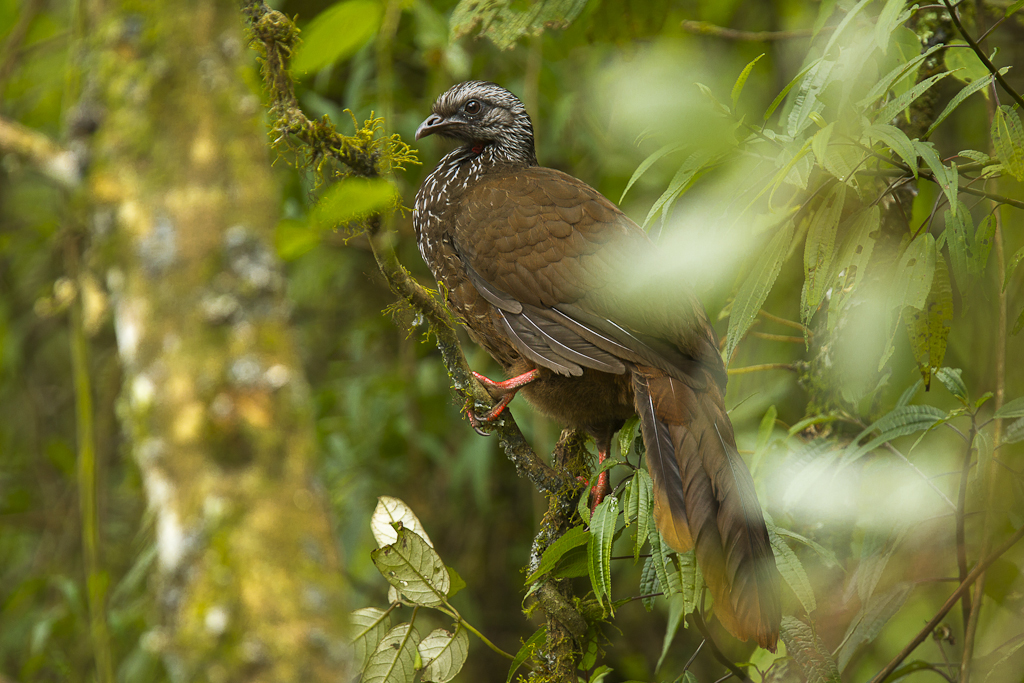

Conservation status
- Near Threatened (IUCN 3.1)

Scientific classification
- Kingdom: Animalia
- Phylum: Chordata
- Class: Aves
- Order: Galliformes
- Family: Cracidae
- Genus: Penelope
- Species: P. barbata

Binomial name
- Penelope barbata Chapman, 1921

= Bearded guan =

Species of bird

The bearded guan (Penelope barbata) is a species of bird in the family Cracidae, the chachalacas, guans, and curassows. It is found in Ecuador and Peru. Its natural habitat is subtropical or tropical moist montane forest. It is threatened by habitat loss.

== Appearance ==
The bearded guan (Penelope barbata) is a small mostly brown bird that is about 55 cm large, and named for it red dewlap (or beard) While most of the bird is brown, it has dark grayish-brown upper parts and rear underparts as well as a silver crown and neck feathers. The bird also has white feathers edging its neck and breast, red legs, and a rufous tail.

== Habitat ==
The bearded guan (Penelope barbata) lives at an altitude of 1200–3000 m in a humid environment located in northwest Peru and southern Ecuador.

== Threats ==
The greatest threat to the bearded guan (Penelope barbata) is deforestation for agriculture and mining.

== Diet ==
No information is known about the dietary habits of the bearded guan (Penelope barbata), however guans in general eat various fruits and berries and well as leaves, flowers and insects.

== Reproduction ==
Bearded guan (Penelope barbata) are a monogamous, territorial species that mate at the beginning of the rain season (March–July). Most species of Guan reach sexual maturity at two years and can reproduce until they reach the age of twenty. A pair of guan will produce a clutch of three eggs which the female will incubate for 24–28 days.
