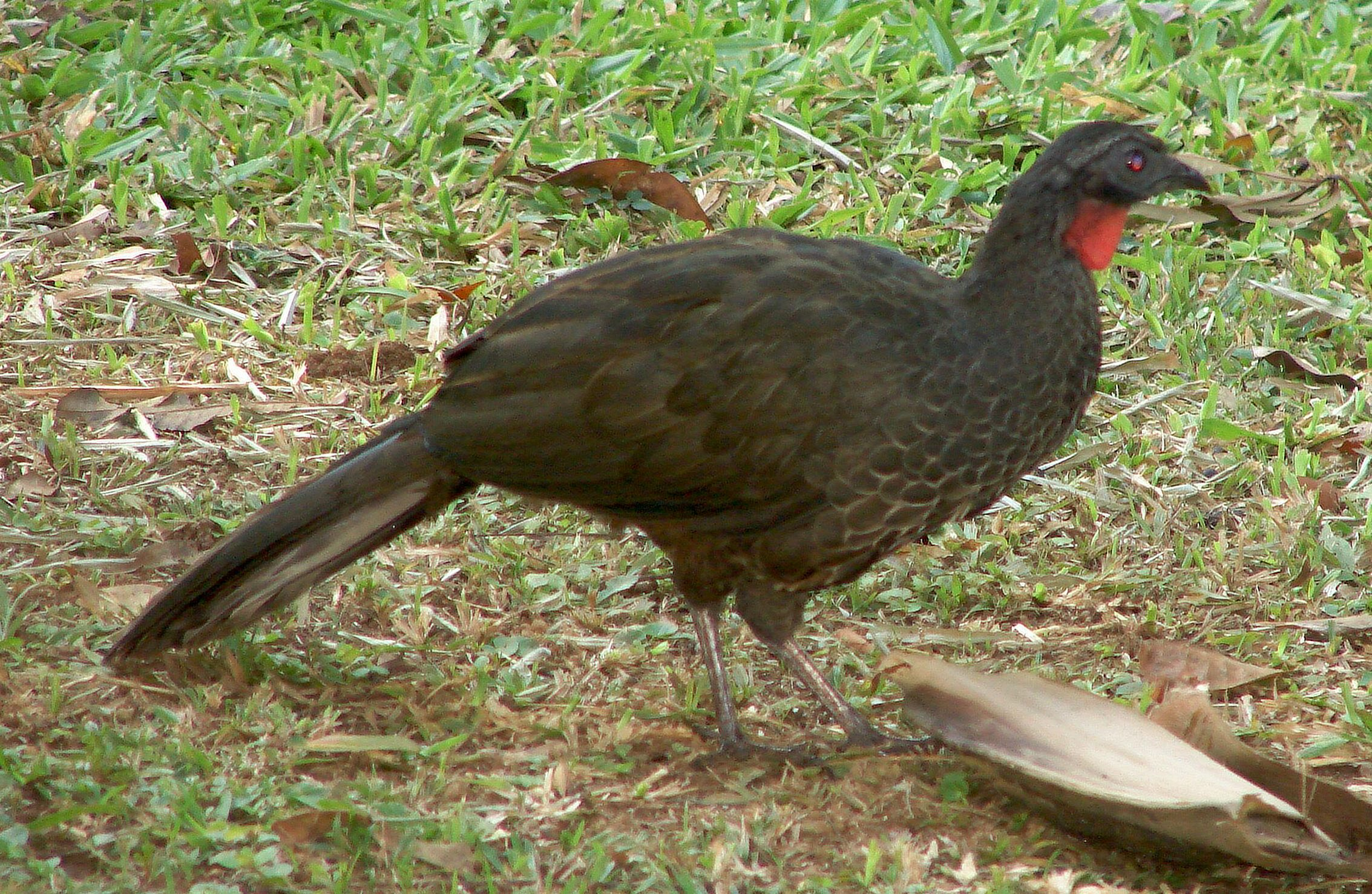

Conservation status
- Near Threatened (IUCN 3.1)

Scientific classification
- Kingdom: Animalia
- Phylum: Chordata
- Class: Aves
- Order: Galliformes
- Family: Cracidae
- Genus: Penelope
- Species: P. superciliaris

Binomial name
- Penelope superciliaris Temminck, 1815

Subspecies
- P. s. pseudonyma (Neumann, 1933); P. s. superciliaris (Temminck, 1815); P. s. jacupemba (Spix, 1825); P. s. major (Bertoni, 1901)

= Rusty-margined guan =

Species of bird

The rusty-margined guan (Penelope superciliaris) is a species of bird in the family Cracidae, which includes the chachalacas, guans, and curassows. It is found in Argentina, Bolivia, Brazil, and Paraguay.

== Taxonomy and systematics ==
The International Ornithological Committee (IOC) and the Handbook of the Birds of the World taxonomies recognize the four rusty-margined guan subspecies listed in the box to the right. The Clements taxonomy does not recognize P. s. pseudonyma as separate but includes its population in the nominate subspecies. Birds in Brazil's Alagoas state are distinctive and might be a separate subspecies. The rusty-margined guan and the Marail guan (P. marail) form a superspecies.

== Description ==
The rusty-margined guan is 55 to 73 cm (1.8 to 2.4 ft) long. The nominate subspecies weighs 950 to 1,150 g (2.1 to 2.5 lb) and P. s. jacupemba 750 to 880 g (1.7 to 1.9 lb). The species' upperparts are dark olive to brownish with the eponymous reddish margins on the wing coverts and scapulars. The belly is also rusty. The face is pale with a supercilium whose color ranges from white to buff or ochre in the different subspecies. P. s. jacupemba paler overall than the nominate and P. s. major is darker.

== Distribution and habitat ==
The nominate subspecies of rusty-margined guan is found in Amazonian Brazil south of the Amazon River. P. s. pseudonyma when treated separately is more westerly than the nominate sensu stricto. P. s. jacupemba is found from central and southern Brazil into eastern Bolivia. P. s. major is found in extreme southeastern Brazil, eastern Paraguay, and extreme northeastern Argentina.

The rusty-margined guan inhabits a wide variety of landscapes across its large range. Examples include the interior and edges of heavy forest, gallery forest, restinga, woodlands in cerrado grasslands, caatinga, mangroves, and Eucalyptus plantations. It is generally a bird of the lowlands but can be found as high as 1,300 m (4,300 ft) in parts of Brazil.

== Behavior ==
=== Movement ===
The rusty-margined guan is essentially sedentary, though in some areas birds roost in higher areas and move down to feed with an elevation change of up to 400 m (1,300 ft). It seldom flies more than about 20 m (66 ft) and usually much less.

=== Feeding ===
The rusty-margined guan forages alone, in pairs, or in groups of up to 10 birds. It mainly feeds between about 5 and 10 m (16 and 33 ft) above the ground, but often feeds on the ground as well. Its diet is almost entirely fruit; one study identified the fruit of 117 plant species. It also eats small amounts of flowers, leaves, and insects.

=== Breeding ===
The rusty-margined guan's breeding season spans October to February in Argentina and August to February in southeastern Brazil; it has not been well defined elsewhere. Its nest is a platform made of sticks lined with live and dead leaves, usually built in a tree. The clutch size is three eggs.

=== Vocal and non-vocal sounds ===
The rusty-margined guan gives a wing-whirring display that has not well defined. It gives a "gruff barking" call, probably in alarm but possibly in other contexts as well.

== Status ==
The IUCN has assessed the rusty-margined guan as being Near Threatened. It is reasonably common only in protected areas though even there poaching is a concern.
