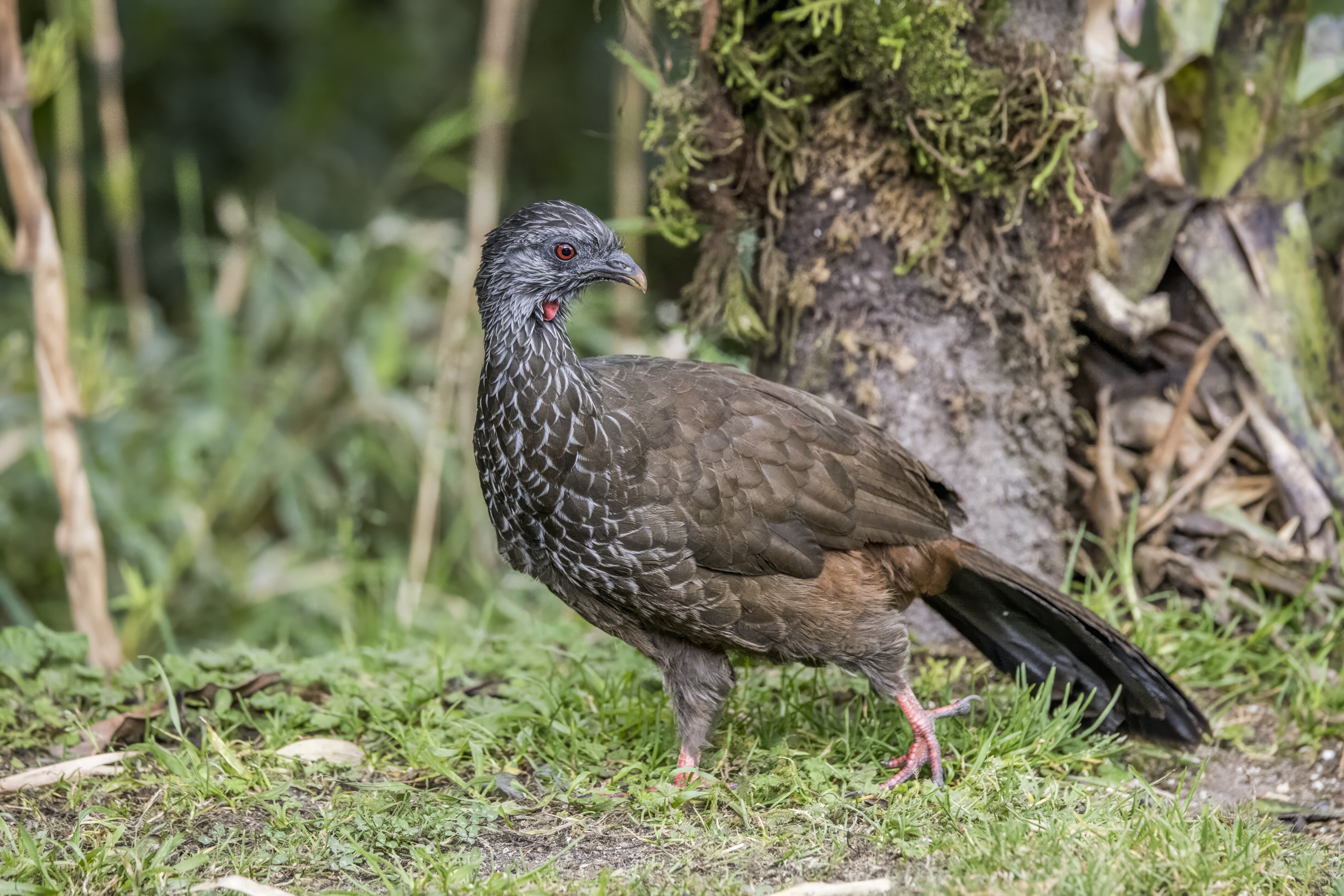
- P. m. montagnii, Colombia

Conservation status
- Least Concern (IUCN 3.1)

Scientific classification
- Kingdom: Animalia
- Phylum: Chordata
- Class: Aves
- Order: Galliformes
- Family: Cracidae
- Genus: Penelope
- Species: P. montagnii

Binomial name
- Penelope montagnii (Bonaparte, 1856)

Subspecies
- P. m. atrogularis (Hellmayr and Conover, 1932); P. m. brooki (Chubb, 1917); P. m. montagnii (Bonaparte, 1856); P. m. plumosa (Berlepsch and Stolzmann, 1902); P. m. sclateri (GR Gray, 1860)

= Andean guan =

Species of bird

The Andean guan (Penelope montagnii) is a gamefowl species of the family Cracidae, in which it belongs to the guan subfamily Penelopinae. This bird occurs in the highlands (5,000 ft/1,500 m ASL and higher) of the Andes, from Venezuela and Colombia through Ecuador and Peru south to Bolivia and perhaps northwesternmost Argentina.

== Description ==
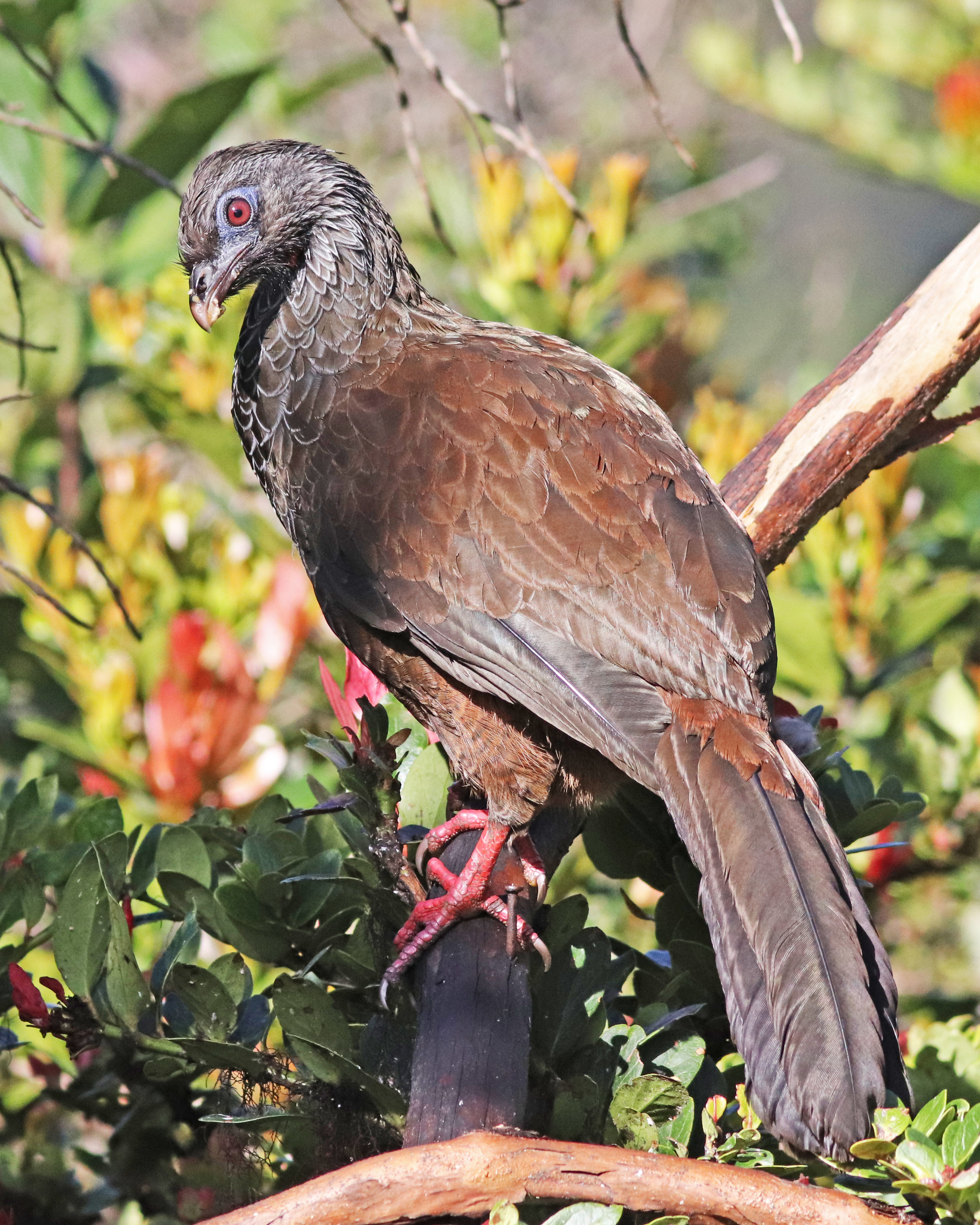
in Yanacocha Reserve, Ecuador

These are medium-sized birds, measuring about 40–58 centimetres (16–23 in) in length and weighing about 500–840 g (1.1–1.9 lb). They are long-bodied with thin necks and small heads, and similar in shape to turkeys but more slender and elegant. The plumage is overall brown with whitish edging to the feathers of the head, neck and chest. It has a red dewlap and reddish legs.

In the Conover Collection of the Field Museum, there is a hypopigmented female specimen of the subspecies atrogularis taken December 20, 1929, at Pucará (west Ecuador). The forehead, chin and upper throat retain the normal color and the hind part of the body is faintly barred pinkish-buff; otherwise the plumage is white. The iris color was not recorded, making it tough to determine whether this is a case of albinism or leucism. Leucism is more frequently seen in birds—particularly in such pronounced cases—, and hypopigmented cracids are rare in the first place. This particular bird has abraded feathers; prior to its death it seems to have been held in a cage for some time, presumably to show off such a rare specimen.

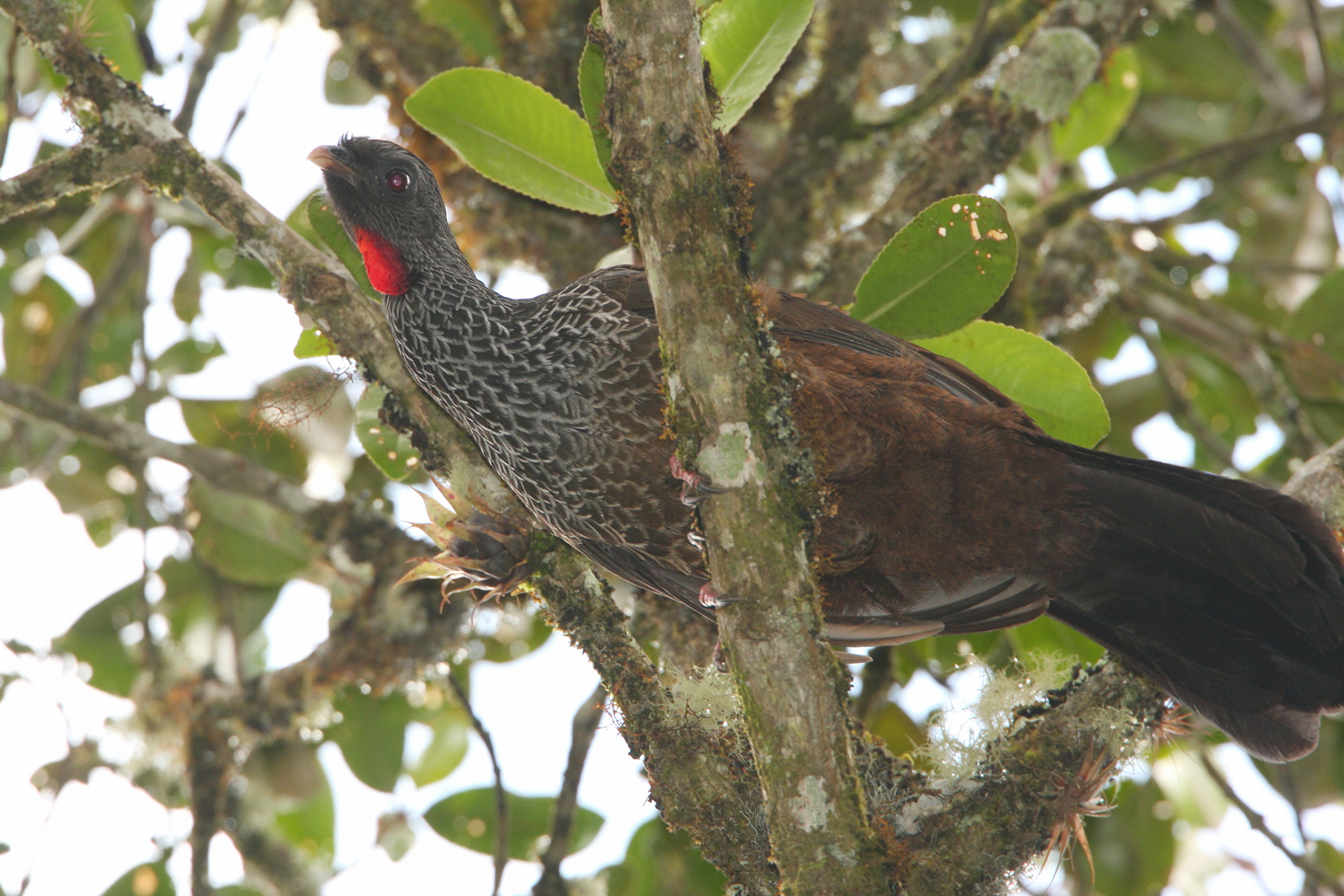
Guango Lodge, Ecuador

== Ecology and status ==
They are inhabitants of cloud forest; the sightings of this cracid are often associated to the migrations of army ants which the bird usually follows. The nest is built in a tree, with a single egg each mating season. Two adults with a young were observed in Ecuador in late June.

Three of four birds of the nominate subspecies, collected on May 29 at the Balcones River near Guasca, were molting their tails. The tail molt starts at the outside and progresses inward, with the old rectrices being shed in alternating pairs.

The Andean guan is affected by habitat destruction, apparently unable to cope with deforestation, and is also hunted for food. However, the Andean guan has a vast range and is thus not globally threatened.

Given its altitudinal range, it might be affected by habitat fragmentation in the long term. There is little data on its overall population, but it occurs in several protected areas in its range. For example, it can be found in the Cocora valley in Quindío Department and the Quimbaya protected forest in Risaralda Department of Colombia, and the Yanacocha Reserve of Ecuador.
