= Yotoco =

Coordinates: 3°52′N 76°23′W

- Municipality and town
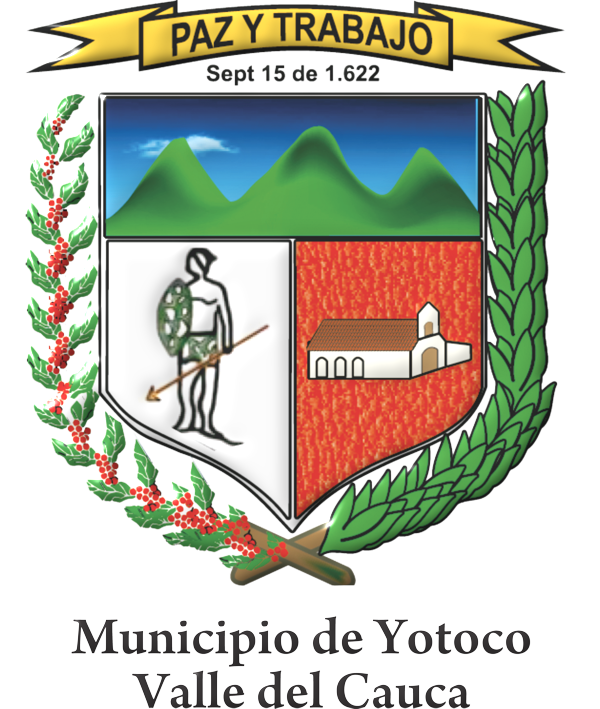
- Flag Coat of arms

- Location of the municipality and town of Yotoco in the Valle del Cauca Department of Colombia
- Country: Colombia
- Department: Valle del Cauca Department

Area
  - Total: 321 km^{2} (124 sq mi)

Population (2015)
  - Total: 16,263
  - Density: 50.7/km^{2} (131/sq mi)
- Time zone: UTC-5 (Colombia Standard Time)

Yotoco is a town and municipality located in the Department of Valle del Cauca, Colombia.

== History ==
Yotoco is a municipality of “Valle del Cauca” (Colombia) and is located in the center subregión. It is known as the king of the winds and was founded in 1622 on the banks of the river that bears his name. Is far from Cali to about 75 km, stand as architectural and tourist references The Making Hato Viejo declared a national monument since 1996 and the Sonso Laguna. According to historians this region was inhabited by freeloaders Indians during the arrival of the Spanish conquistadors and was founded by the Spanish Captain Diego Rengifo Salazar in the year 1622, on the banks of the river that bears his name. According to legend, at that site commanded the chief Yotoco and the name Yotat means "blowgun" because the population was near the land of blowgun. On December 5, 1777 the viceparrish was erected; in 1858 it appeared as a village and in 1864 was elevated to the category of district with the name "Sucre", which was preserved until 1868. Through Decree 455 of April 24 1908 it was annexed to the municipality of Buga, then in 1912, according to Law 23 passed to the municipality of Cali. That same year it returned to belong to Buga until, finally, it was given the autonomy and became the Municipality of Yotoco.

== Geography ==
Yotoco territory is divided into two different areas: a flat, belonging to the Cauca River Valley and another mountain, on the west, which is part of the eastern slopes of the “Cordillera Occidental”. Among the highlights orographic Altos Heart, The Garden, Guacas, La Cecilia, La Florida, Paloalto, Sugar Loaf and pulpit. Their lands are distributed in heat, hot, medium and cold floors, watered by the Cauca River and Mediacanoa rivers, stones, Volcano and Yotoco, as well as various smaller streams.

LIMITS AND SOME DISTANCES

It borders on the north with the municipality of Riofrío (29), on the east with San Pedro (31), Buga (20) and Guacarí (19), to the south with the municipality of Vijes (37), to the west with Calima-Darién (10) and Restrepo (28). It is about 75 km. to Cali (9), and about 115 km. to Buenaventura (6), it is also about 12 km. to Buga.

== Economy ==
The main economic activities in our municipality is agriculture and other activities like hog farming, poultry, cattle rising, and the exploitation of rock and sand, coffee production, pineapple, avocado, plantain, tomato, beans and sugar cane. Due to its location on the main artery to Calima Lake and Buenaventura's port there are many hotels and restaurants located along the route, which generates great employment.

== Culture ==
Yotoco is a municipality located in the center of Valle del Cauca of whose traditional roots are of peasant culture and various celebrations of a religious type. It is normal to find festivals and celebrations in the rural area at different times of the year. This municipality is privileged by having one of the three schools of music in the country. The name of this school is "Rey de los vientos"(King of the winds). This school is directed by Juan Pablo Parra Noreña, sponsored by The Municipal administration. Also there is a Cultural House "Herminio Salguero" which publishes the book of Cuenta cuentos que yo me invento written by the students and teachers of the educational institutions of the Municipality: Alfonso Zawadzky, Gabriela Mistral, San Juan Bosco. With the support of the Ministry of Education the book Cruce de Miradas was just published which contains pictures of memorable people and places, poems and narrations of some of its inhabitants. The Municipality counts with the "Alejandro Arce Library" both inaugurated by the Culture Ministers of the years 2008 and 2015. It is currently in the municipality as a historic cultural flagship as part of Hato Viejo Farm which is private. The farm has colonial architecture and its monumental ceiba which is about 600 years old. They are part of the beauty of rural and urban Yotoco. Chiquique wetland is also part of the fishing tradition in the municipality also contributing the traditional Bocachico and corroncho and mojarra fish that fed our "yotocences" traditional families.

== Tourism ==
The Municipality of Yotoco is a territory in tourist development, where thanks to the support of community organizations and institutions that base this activity with sustainable processes minimizing the negative impact that this can generate.

=== EcoTourism ===
La hacienda Hato Viejo located on the road Vijes, via Panorama, it was declared a National Monument of Colombia in 1996. Whose house dates back like the chapel 350 years ago. In the eighteenth century the estate played a very important socio-economic and cultural role in the colonial economic circuit... It took care of supplying food and various products derived from sugarcane for mines. It was also an instrument for colonization and population of the region that is now called "Valle del Cauca.

LAGUNA DE EL SONSO O CHIRCAL

It is a nature reserve since 1987 by the Agreement CVC No 17, October 1978 and regulated the use of land, water and airspace by the Agreement CVC No 16, May 1979. The lake has an area of 2045 hectares located between Guacarí, Buga and Yotoco municipalities, It also is the 14th largest wetland in the upper part of the Cauca system, and it is one of the most important sites at a regional level for bird watching, environmental education, sightseeing and research . Some of the species you will find there are swamp vultures, osprey and cattle heron. It is a habitat for mammals such as the common possum, common vampire and in recent years the capybara. The most common fish are the bocachico, chamburos, Caracolíes, swifts and chambimbes. The most common shrub species are: planta de garza, gamíneas and rushes. Others like the “archucha” and stiff brooms are used by animal species as shelter, nesting and feeding. The reserve is a natural regulation system of the Cauca River and is used as a means of subsistence through artisanal fisheries.

=== Recreational Tourism ===
Here are many sites for artisanal fisheries such as: Escondite and Picapiedra Lake on the route to Buga; Colombia Lake located on the Panorama route near to the toll on the road to Mediacanoa; Chiquique Wetlands and other sites with panoramic sightseeing such as Dopo's Stone located in Dopo Town and also the Natural Reserved Park on the road to Buenaventura.

CULTURAL TOURISM SITES

Hacienda Hato Viejo –between Yotoco and Vijes-on the Panorama Road. Boyaca Central Park -Valle del Dorado

=== Gastronomic tourism ===
- From Taipa to Rancho Rojo, there are many restaurants that serve traditional dishes from various regions. - At the Puente Tierra truck stop, located at the 20th kilometer on the way to Buenaventura, one can find specialties—such as their sausages and fried foods—that are well-known throughout the country.
