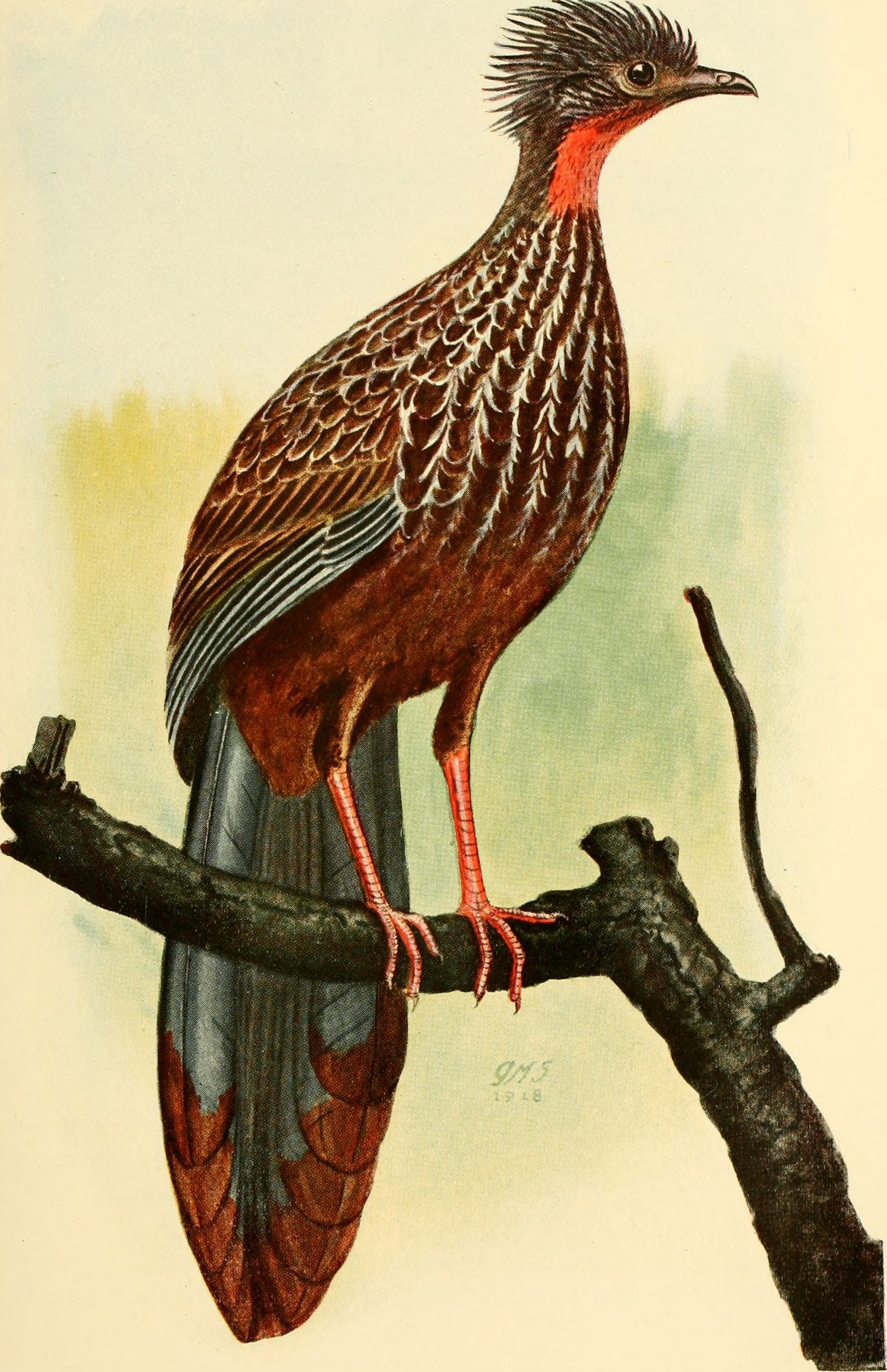
- Penelope argyrotis

Conservation status
- Least Concern (IUCN 3.1)

Scientific classification
- Kingdom: Animalia
- Phylum: Chordata
- Class: Aves
- Order: Galliformes
- Family: Cracidae
- Genus: Penelope
- Species: P. argyrotis

Binomial name
- Penelope argyrotis (Bonaparte, 1856)

= Band-tailed guan =

Species of bird

The band-tailed guan (Penelope argyrotis) is a species of bird in the family Cracidae, the chachalacas, guans, and curassows. It is found in Colombia and Venezuela.

== Taxonomy and systematics ==
The band-tailed guan is closely related to bearded guan (Penelope barbata) and they at times have been considered conspecific. The band-tailed guan has three subspecies, the nominate P. a. argyrotis, P. a. albicauda, and P. a. colombiana. The last of these has sometimes been treated as a separate species, and two other subspecies split from albicauda and colombiana have been proposed, but these treatments have not gained support.

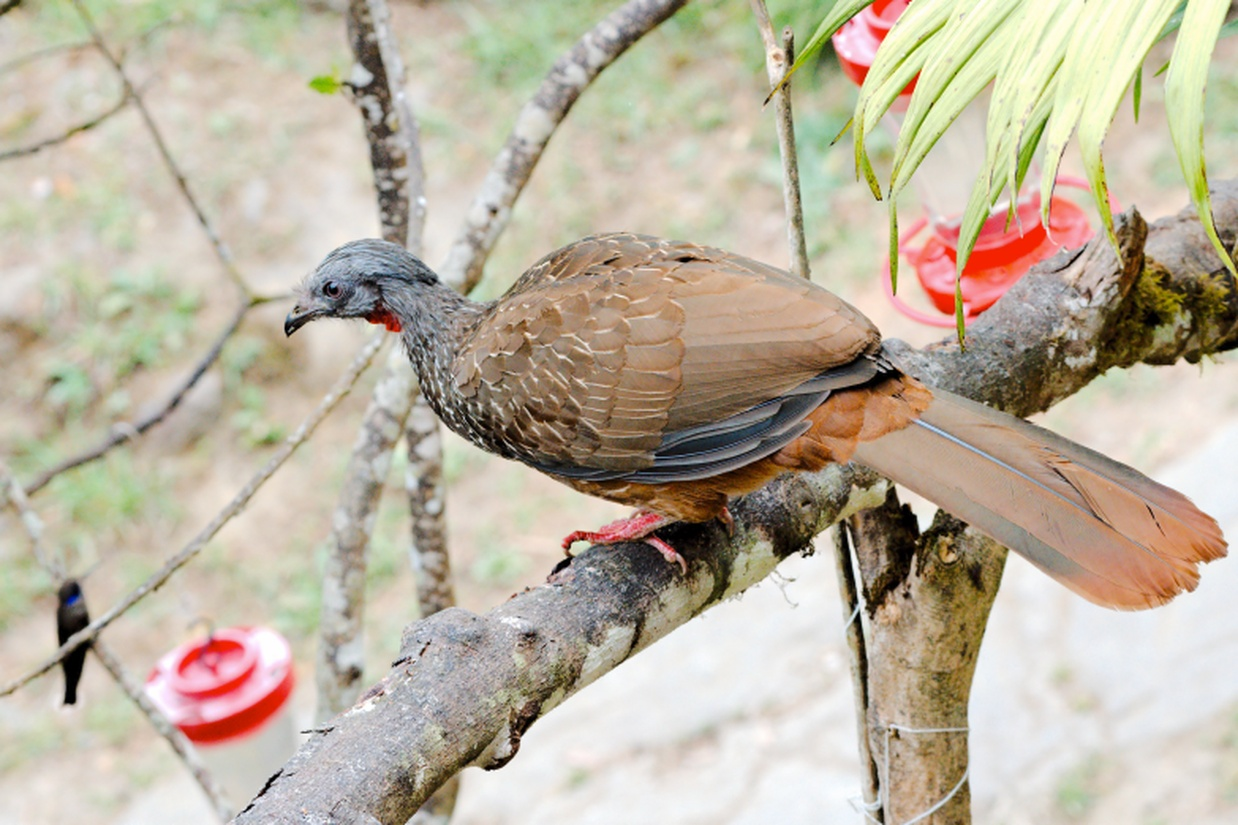
Band-tailed guan

== Description ==
The band-tailed guan is 50 to 61 cm (1.6 to 2.0 ft) long. Males weigh 686 to 981 g (1.5 to 2.2 lb) and females 625 to 900 g (1.4 to 2.0 lb). The nominate subspecies' upperparts are blackish-brown to dark rufous with conspicuous white streaks. Its breast is olive brown and belly is pale to medium brown. Its face is pale grey to white and it has a prominent red dewlap. It gets its name from the wide chestnut band across the end of the tail. P. a. albicauda differs from the nominate by having buffy tips on the tail feathers. P. a. colombiana has more white on the crown and less white on the face than the nominate.

== Distribution and habitat ==
The nominate subspecies of band-tailed guan is found in the eastern Andes of Colombia and western Venezuela and also in the Venezuelan Coastal Range. P. a. albicauda is found in the Serranía del Perijá of northern Colombia and northwestern Venezuela. The nominate P. a. argyrotis is restricted to the Sierra Nevada de Santa Marta of northern Colombia. They mostly inhabit dense wet virgin forest, though they will sometimes be found in secondary forest, shade coffee plantations, and the upper reaches of drier forest. In the Sierra Nevada de Santa Marta they range in elevation from 550 to 2,000 m (1,800 to 6,560 ft) and in Venezuela usually from 800 to 2,400 m (2,600 to 7,900 ft), though locally much higher or lower.

== Behavior ==
=== Feeding ===
The band-tailed guan usually forages in groups of up to six, but more may feed in a fruit-laden tree. It feeds on fruit, usually in the mid-story, but will eat fallen fruit on the ground.

=== Breeding ===
The band-tailed guan's breeding season extends from January to May. It is territorial though several territories may be close to each other. The nest is a loose structure of plant matter placed up to 8 m (26 ft) high in a tree.

=== Vocal and non-vocal sounds ===
The band-tailed guan uses a wing-rattling display to announce territories; it sounds like "canvas ripping forward, then in reverse". Alarm calls are "soft, piping whistles" and in extreme alarm "a repeated shrieking 'GUEEA!' interspersed by various gruff notes".

== Status ==
The IUCN has assessed the band-tailed guan as being of Least Concern. It is uncommon to fairly common in most of its range and in Venezuela occurs in several protected areas. However, it is threatened by deforestation and hunting.
