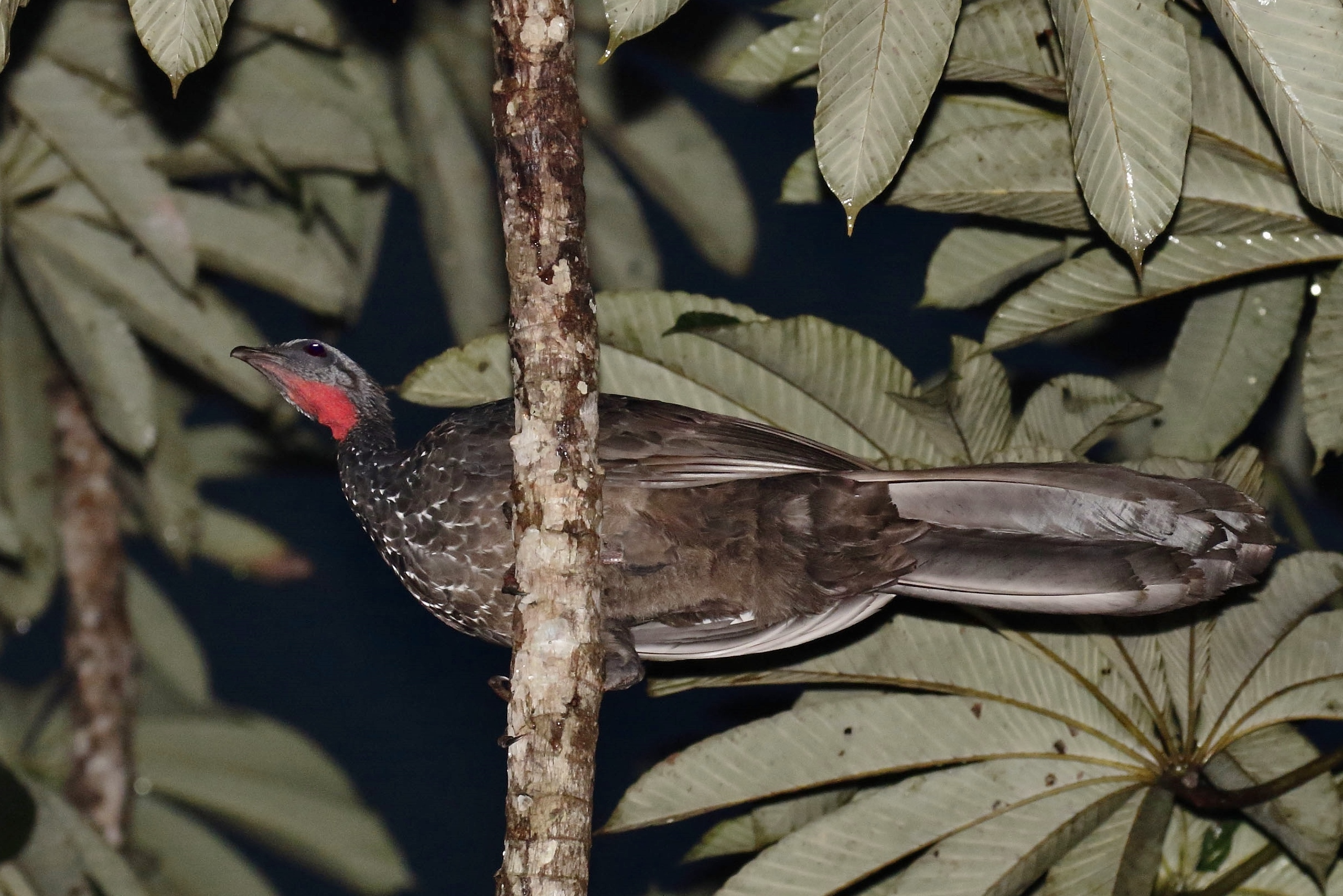
- Marail guan at Presidente Figueiredo, Amazonas state, Brazil

Conservation status
- Least Concern (IUCN 3.1)

Scientific classification
- Kingdom: Animalia
- Phylum: Chordata
- Class: Aves
- Order: Galliformes
- Family: Cracidae
- Genus: Penelope
- Species: P. marail

Binomial name
- Penelope marail (Müller, PLS, 1776)

Subspecies
- P. m. jacupeba (Spix, 1825); P. m. marail (PLS Müller, 1776)

= Marail guan =

Species of bird

The marail guan or Cayenne guan (Penelope marail) is a species of bird in the family Cracidae, the chachalacas, guans, and curassows. It is found in Brazil, French Guiana, Guyana, Suriname, and Venezuela.

== Taxonomy and systematics ==
The marail guan was formally described in 1776 by the German zoologist Philipp Statius Müller under the binomial name Phasianus marail. Müller based his account on "Le Marail" from Cayenne that had been described in 1771 by the French naturalist, the Comte de Buffon in his Histoire Naturelle des Oiseaux. The marail guan is now one of 15 species placed in the genus Penelope that was introduced in 1776 by the German naturalist Blasius Merrem. The specific epithet and the common name are from Marai, the Carib word for a guan.

Two subspecies are recognised:

- P. m. jacupeba Spix, 1825 – southeast Venezuela and north Brazil
- P. m. marail (Müller, PLS, 1776) – east Venezuela and the Guianas

== Description ==
The marail guan is 63 to 68 cm (2.1 to 2.2 ft) long. Males weigh 772 to 1,310 g (1.7 to 2.9 lb) and females 770 to 1,450 g (1.7 to 3.2 lb). The back, wings, and central tail feathers of the nominate subspecies are dark with a greenish olive gloss. The outer tail feathers are bluish black. Its throat and chest are dark with white speckles and the belly reddish brown. It has a red dewlap. P. m. jacupeba is slightly smaller, paler, and more a grayish brown.

== Distribution and habitat ==
The nominate subspecies of marail guan is found from eastern Venezuela through the Guianas. P. m. jacupeba is found in northern Brazil north of the Amazon River and possibly in southeastern Venezuela, although not all authorities accept the latter. It mostly inhabits mature tropical forest though it can be found in secondary forest. In the Guianas and Brazil is favors terre firma forest with dense undergrowth. It is a bird of the lowlands, in Venezuela ranging between 100 and 600 m (330 and 1,970 ft) of elevation.

== Behavior ==
=== Movement ===
The marail guan appears to be sedentary. A study in Suriname found territories ranged in size from 2 to 9 ha (4.9 to 22 acres).

=== Feeding ===
The marail guan forages singly or in groups of up to six, mostly in the canopy and lower levels of the forest but sometimes on the ground. Its diet is almost entirely fruits though insects are occasionally taken.

=== Breeding ===
The marail guan's breeding season varies within its range. It appears to span from October to February in the Guianas and extend further in Brazil. It builds a cup nest high in a tree fork and lays two or three eggs.

=== Vocal and non-vocal sounds ===
The marail guan gives a wing-whirring display, usually before dawn, and usually follows it with a barking "whaf, whaf, whaf". It also gives the barking calls at dusk.

== Status ==
The IUCN has assessed the marail guan as being of Least Concern. It is fairly common to common throughout its large range but like all guans is subject to hunting pressure.
