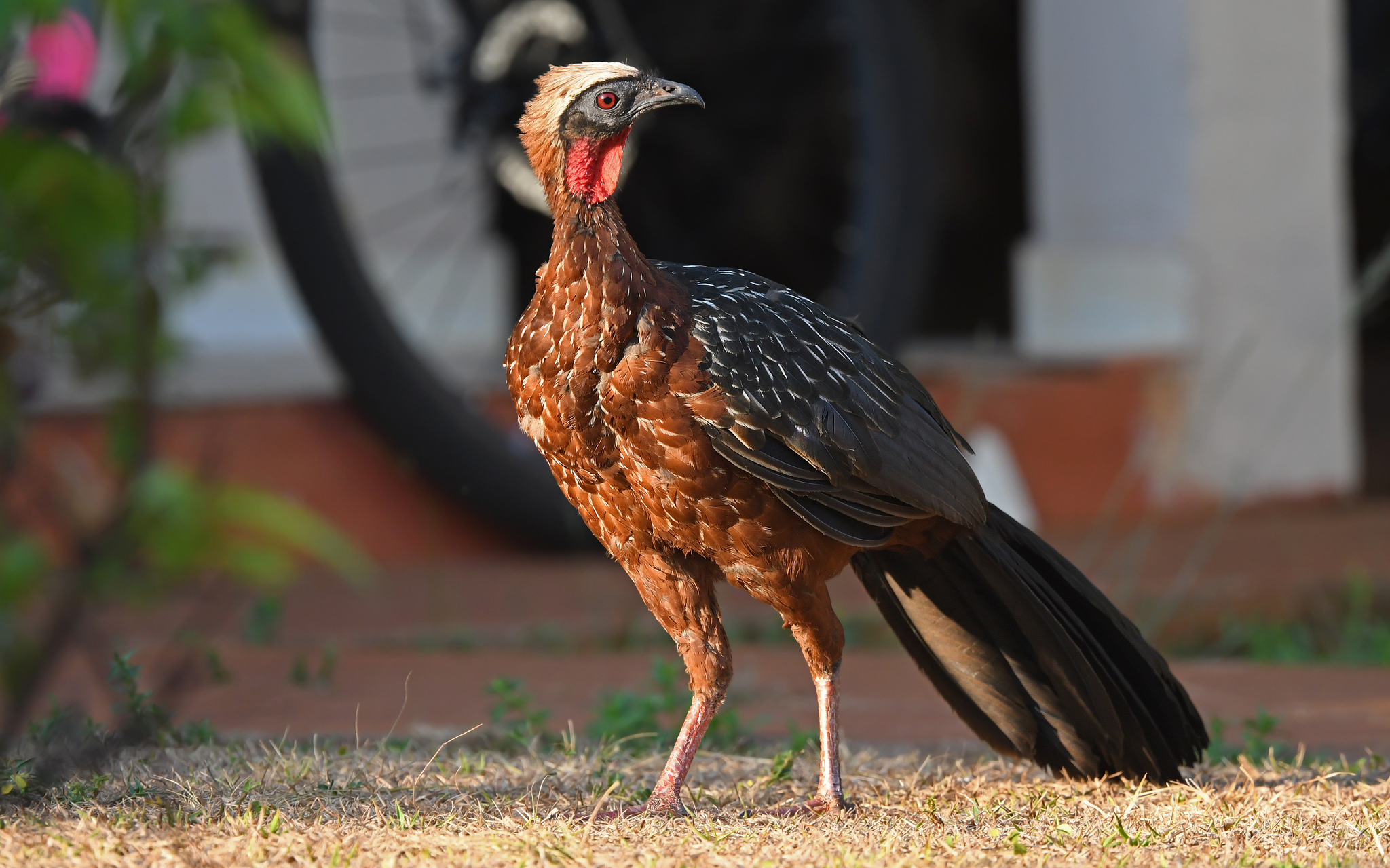

Conservation status
- Vulnerable (IUCN 3.1)

Scientific classification
- Kingdom: Animalia
- Phylum: Chordata
- Class: Aves
- Order: Galliformes
- Family: Cracidae
- Genus: Penelope
- Species: P. pileata

Binomial name
- Penelope pileata Wagler, 1830

= White-crested guan =

Species of bird

The white-crested guan (Penelope pileata) is a species of bird in the family Cracidae, the chachalacas, guans, and curassows. It is found only in regions of the eastern Amazon basin of Brazil. The species is restricted to the southern riverbank of the Amazon River; also eastwards, the south bank of the Pará River south of Marajó Island at the Amazon River's outlet. Its natural habitat is subtropical or tropical moist lowland forest. It is threatened by habitat destruction and in 2012, the species was recategorised by the International Union for Conservation of Nature, its conservation status being raised to vulnerable.

== Description ==
The white-crested guan is a large bird and grows to a length of about 80 centimetres (31 in). It has a long crest of white feathers which gives it its name, bluish cheeks, black upper parts glossed with green, dark reddish-brown underparts and a long black tail. The voice is a raucous cackle, "eh-uh" or "u u u u u".

== Distribution and habitat ==
The white-crested guan is endemic to Brazil. Its range is limited to the south-central and southeastern parts of the Amazon basin, although it just extends across the Rio Araguaia into the Cerrado ecoregion. Its habitat is tropical forest, mostly dense, solid-ground forest, but it sometimes also occurs in seasonally-flooded areas.

== Status ==
The greatest threat faced by the white-crested guan is destruction of its rainforest habitat. As increasing amounts of forest are cleared and converted into agricultural land and cattle ranches, suitable habitat is reduced. The bird is intolerant of this and populations are fragmenting and declining. It is also hunted for food and captured for the aviary trade, so the International Union for Conservation of Nature has raised its conservation status to vulnerable.
