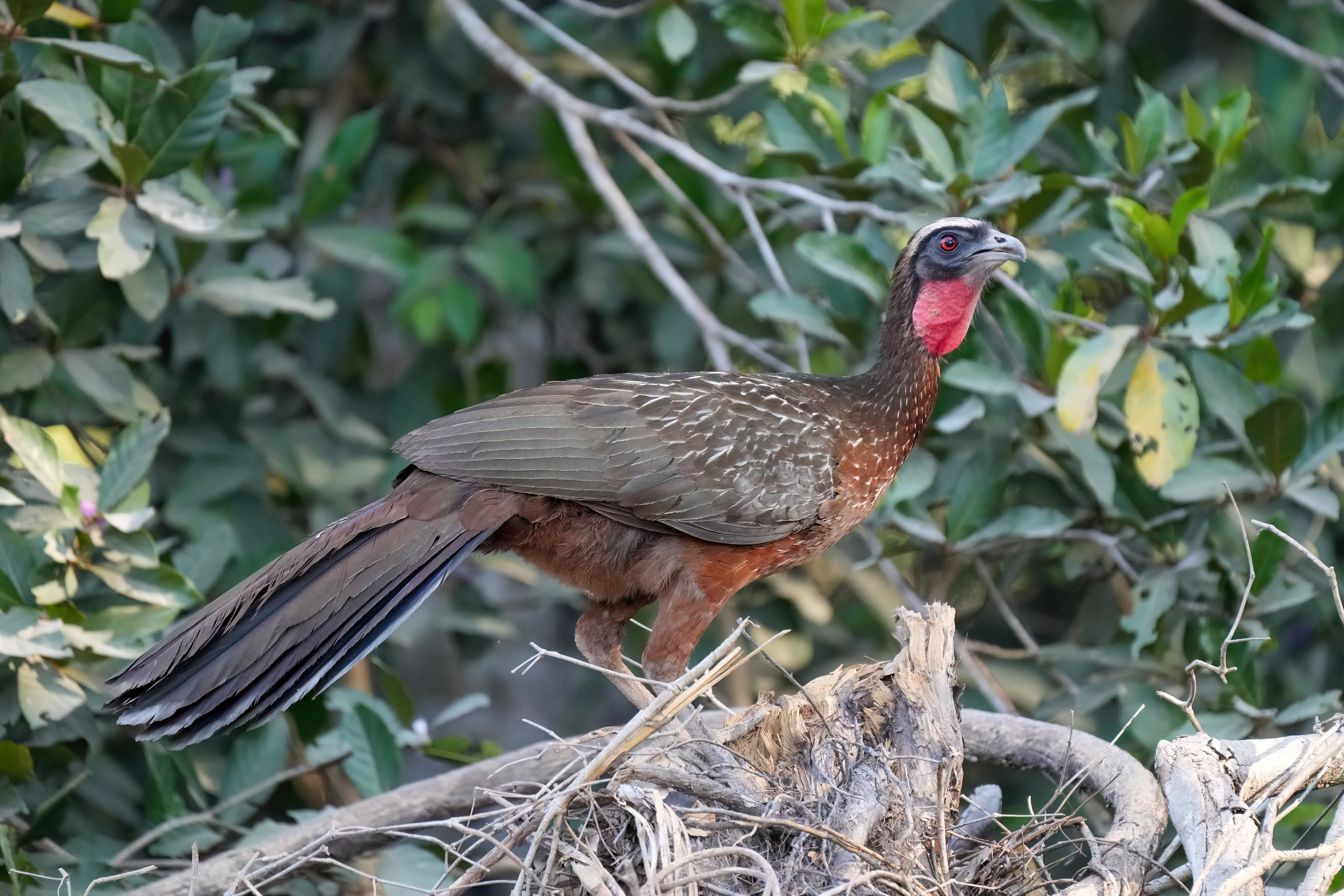
- Male
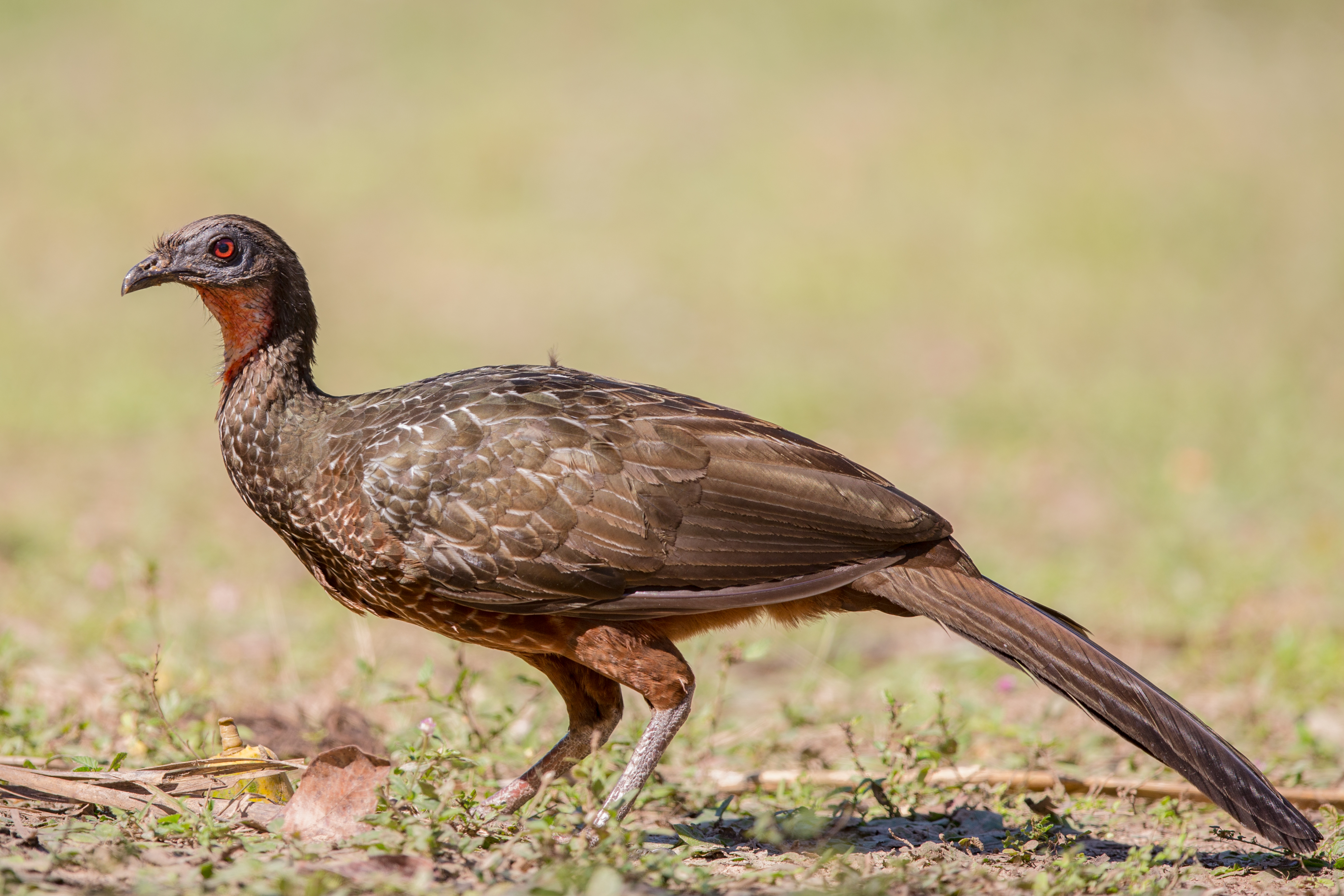
- Female

Conservation status
- Vulnerable (IUCN 3.1)

Scientific classification
- Kingdom: Animalia
- Phylum: Chordata
- Class: Aves
- Order: Galliformes
- Family: Cracidae
- Genus: Penelope
- Species: P. ochrogaster

Binomial name
- Penelope ochrogaster Pelzeln, 1870

= Chestnut-bellied guan =

Species of bird in Brazil

The chestnut-bellied guan (Penelope ochrogaster) is a species of bird in the family Cracidae. It is found only in Brazil. Its natural habitats are subtropical or tropical dry forest and subtropical or tropical swampland. It is threatened by habitat loss.

== Appearance ==
Chestnut-bellied guan is a medium-sized bird that is light brown at the head, fading darker approaching the wings and even darker at the tail. There are white spots from the chest to the abdomen and on the wing coverts. The bird has bright red plumage on its chest, and the facial skin is dusky.

== Voice ==
The song of the chestnut-bellied guan is described as 'crowlike' and 'rough'.

== Location ==
The species is distributed throughout the northeastern part of Brazil; however, the three big clusters are in Pantanal, Central Brazil, and along the São Francisco river segment that runs through Rio de Janeiro.
