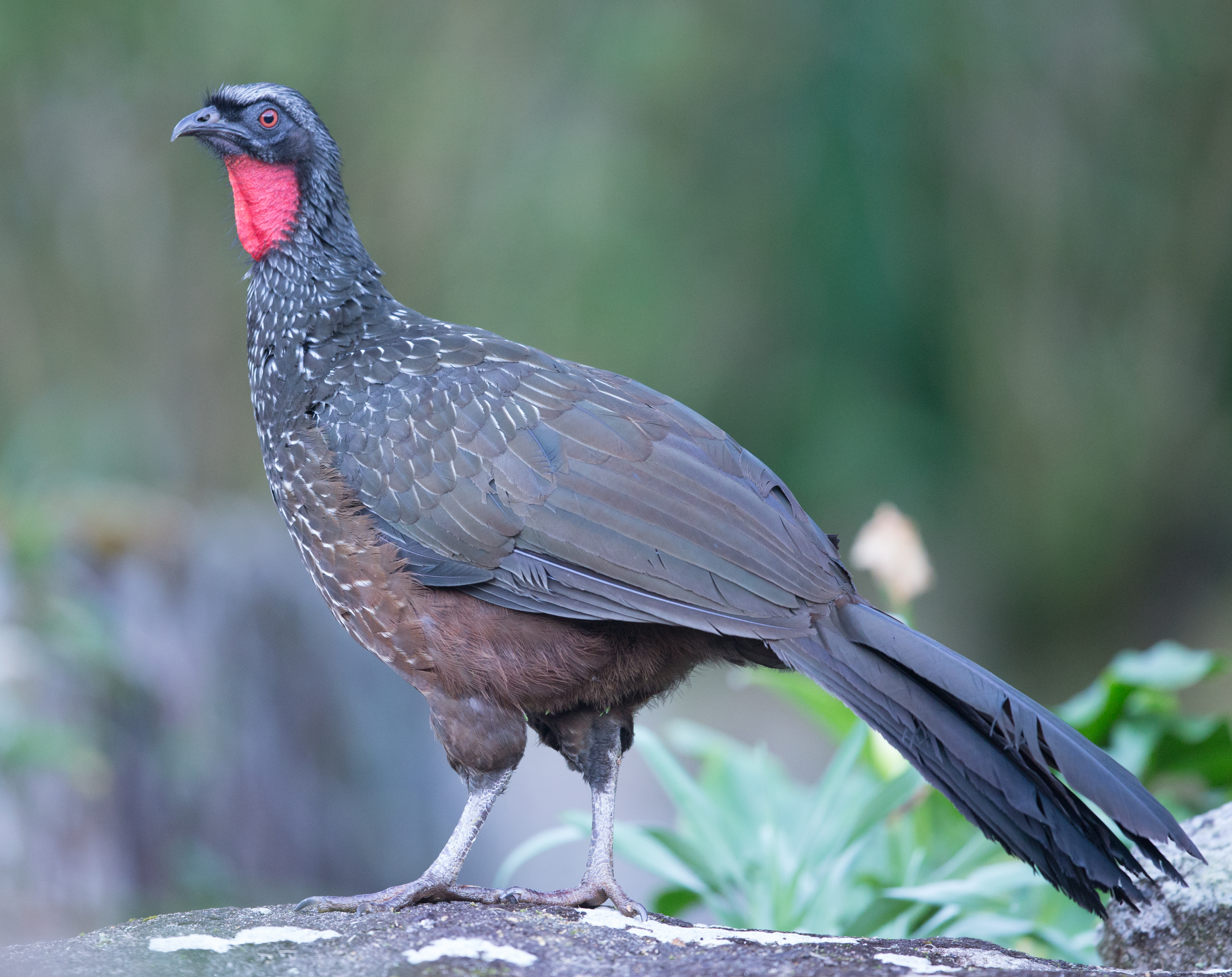

Conservation status
- Least Concern (IUCN 3.1)

Scientific classification
- Kingdom: Animalia
- Phylum: Chordata
- Class: Aves
- Order: Galliformes
- Family: Cracidae
- Genus: Penelope
- Species: P. obscura

Binomial name
- Penelope obscura Temminck, 1815

Subspecies
- P. o. obscura (Temminck, 1815); P. o. bronzina (Hellmayr, 1914)

= Dusky-legged guan =

Species of bird

The dusky-legged guan (Penelope obscura) is a species of bird in the family Cracidae, the chachalacas, guans, and curassows. It is found in Uruguay, northeastern Argentina and southernmost areas of Paraguay and Brazil. In early 2021, the former subspecies P. o. bridgesi, found in southwestern Bolivia and northwestern Argentina, was elevated to species rank as Yungas guan.

== Habitat ==
Its natural habitats are subtropical or tropical moist lowland forest.

== Description ==
The bird measures an average of 73 centimeters in length and weighs an average of 1.2 kilograms, being very similar in appearance to its smaller relative, the rusty-margined guan (P. supercilliaris).

== Diet ==
It eats fruit, flowers and buds taken from the ground or plucked from tree branches, and acts as a seed disperser for various species of trees and palms, such as the endangered palm Euterpe edulis, or the palms of the genus Syagrus (e.g. queen palm and licuri). Coffee beans digested by the bird are sold for high prices.
