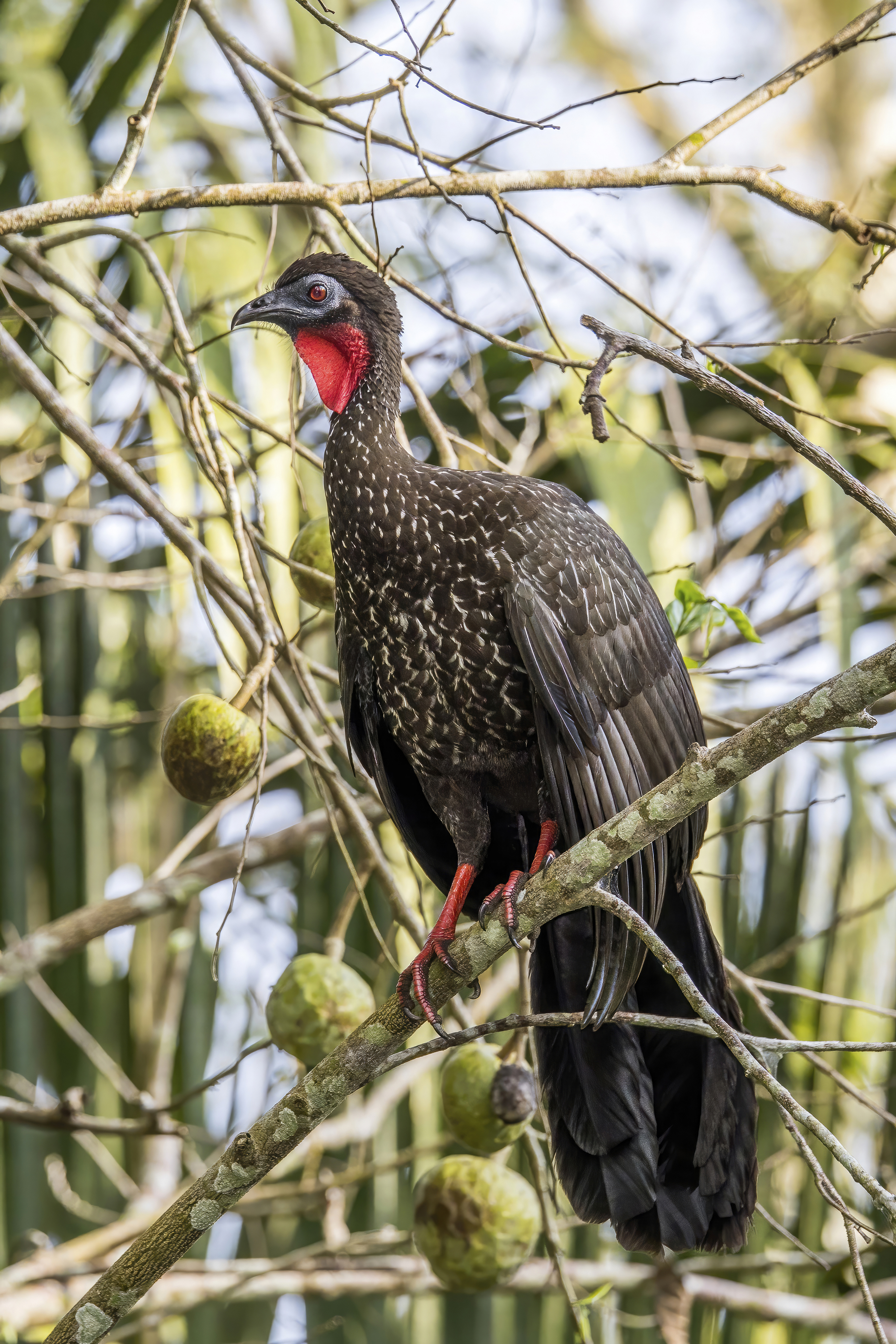
- Penelope purpurascens purpurascens, Belize
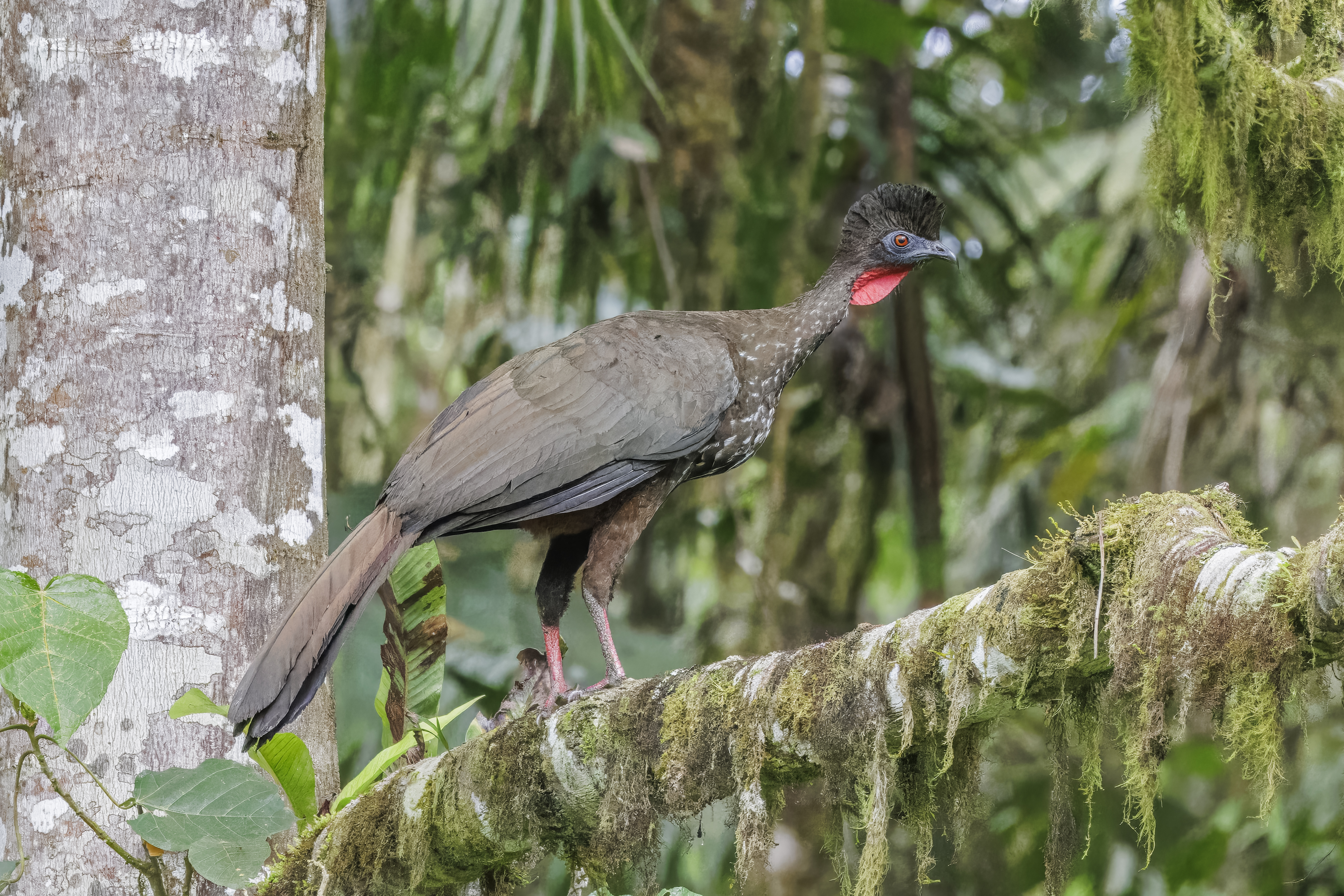
- Penelope purpurascens aequatorialis, Ecuador

Conservation status
- Near Threatened (IUCN 3.1)

Scientific classification
- Kingdom: Animalia
- Phylum: Chordata
- Class: Aves
- Order: Galliformes
- Family: Cracidae
- Genus: Penelope
- Species: P. purpurascens

Binomial name
- Penelope purpurascens Wagler, 1830

Subspecies
- See text

= Crested guan =

Species of bird

The crested guan (Penelope purpurascens) is a Near Threatened species in an ancient group of birds of the family Cracidae, which are related to the Australasian megapodes or mound builders (Megapodiidae). It is found from central Mexico through Central America and in Colombia, Ecuador, Peru, and Venezuela.

== Taxonomy and systematics ==
The crested guan has three subspecies, the nominate P. p. purpurascens (Wagler, 1830), P. p. aequatorialis (Salvadori & Festa, 1900), and P. p. brunnescens (Hellmayr & Conover, 1932).

== Description ==
The crested guan is 76 to 91.5 cm (30 to 36 in) long and weighs about 1.6 to 2.4 kg (3.5 to 5.3 lb). Among standard measurements, its wing chord is 33 to 37 cm (13 to 15 in), its tail is 29 to 36 cm (11 to 14 in), and its tarsus is 6.5 to 8.6 cm (2.6 to 3.4 in). It is similar in general appearance to a turkey, with a small head, long strong legs, and a long broad tail. The sexes are similar. Adults of the nominate subspecies are mostly dusky olive brown and have a faint greenish or purplish iridescence. Their belly and crissum are chestnut and the breast and belly feathers have white edges. Their throat has some bristles and its loose skin dangles as a small red wattle. Juveniles resemble adults but overall mottled with blackish brown and with a rufous brown wash on the wing and tail feathers. Both sexes have a red iris, a blackish bill, slaty black bare skin on their face, and red legs and feet. Subspecies P. p. aequatorialis is similar to the nominate, but smaller and more rufescent. Subspecies P. p. brunnescens is more rufescent than the nominate but less so than aequatorialis.

== Distribution and habitat ==
The nominate subspecies of the crested guan is the northernmost. It is found in Mexico from Sinaloa in the west and southern Tamaulipas in the east and south along the Pacific and Caribbean slopes through Belize and Guatemala into El Salvador and Honduras. Subspecies P. p. aequatorialis is found across much of Nicaragua and south through Costa Rica, Panama, western Colombia, and western Ecuador into far northwestern Peru. Subspecies P. p. brunnescens is found in the Serranía del Perijá where northeastern Colombia and northwestern Venezuela meet, east around Lake Maracaibo, and also in the Venezuelan Coastal Ranges intermittenly from Falcón to Delta Amacuro.

The crested guan inhabits a variety of forested landscapes including tropical and subtropical evergreen and deciduous forest, cloudforest, gallery forest, and evergreen montane forest. Most are semi-humid to humid though it occurs locally in drier forest as well. In elevation it is found from sea level to 2,500 m (8,200 ft) in northern Central America, to 1,800 m (5,900 ft) in Costa Rica, to 1,500 m (4,900 ft) in Colombia and Ecuador, to 800 m (2,600 ft) in Peru, and to 1,100 m (3,600 ft) in Venezuela.

== Behavior ==
=== Movement ===
The crested guan is a year-round resident throughout its range.

=== Feeding ===
The crested guan is generally considered to feed on fruit, usually high in the canopy where it takes it directly from the tree, though it will feed at any level including on the ground. It is usually in pairs or loose flocks that quickly and agiley move from limb to limb by jumps and short flights. However, a study on Barro Colorado Island in Panama found that a high percentage of its diet there was young leaves, with insects also making a significant contribution.

=== Breeding ===
The crested guan is monogamous. Its breeding season in Costa Rica spans from March to June but is not defined elsewhere. Its nest is a bulky platform of twigs and leaves constructed high in a tree. Its usual clutch size is believed to be two eggs. In captivity its incubation period is about 26 days. Its incubation period, time to fledging, and details of parental care in the wild are not known.

=== Vocal and non-vocal sounds ===
The crested guan's dawn song is a "powerful 'steam-whistle' call, ending in a low growl: ku LEEErrr!". It also makes "a loud, honking quonk" and in alarm a series of "extraordinarily loud, honking squawks, quonk, quonk, quonk, rrrrrrrrr". Other vocalizations include "a loud, far-carrying, honking WOK!-WOK!-WOK!-WOK!-WOK!-WOOAK!-WOOAK!-WOOK!...; a piping POK!-POK!-POK!...; and a low, nasal, grunting aahhnk-aahhnk". In the breeding season, at or near dawn males make a display flight during which they drum or whirr their wings.

== Status ==
The IUCN originally in 2004 assessed the crested guan as being of Least concern but in 2021 uplisted it to Near Threatened. It has a large range; its estimated population of between 50,000 and 500,000 mature individuals is believed to be decreasing. "The species is threatened by the loss and fragmentation of its forest habitat, mainly for conversion to agricultural land and cattle pastures. Moreover, the species is hunted heavily throughout its range, particularly in Central America." Mexican authorities consider it Threatened. It is considered uncommon in northern Central America, fairly common in protected areas in Costa Rica, uncommon in Colombia, rare and local in Ecuador, "apparently rare" in Peru, and uncommon and local in Venezuela.
