= List of Galliformes =

The Galliformes are a clade of bird species of cosmopolitan distribution that, with the Anseriformes, belong to the branch Galloanserae. The group have more than 270 living species and includes the megapodes, chachalacas, guans, curassows, turkeys, grouse, New World quails, pheasants, partridges and guineafowl. They are, with Neoaves, the two main lineages of Neognathae. Extinct species assignment follows the Mikko's Phylogeny Archive and Paleofile.com websites.

== Species ==
=== Family †Gallinuloididae Lucas 1900 ===
- Genus †Gallinuloides Eastman 1900
  - †Gallinuloides wyomingensis Eastman 1900
- Genus †Paraortygoides Mayr 2000
  - †Paraortygoides messelensis Mayr 2000
  - †Paraortygoides radagasti Dyke & Gulas 2002

=== Family †Paraortygidae Mourer-Chauviré 1992 ===
- Genus †Pirortyx Brodkorb 1964
  - †Pirortyx major (Gaillard 1939) Brodkorb 1964
- Genus †Scopelortyx Mourer-Chauviré, Pickford & Senut 2015
  - †Scopelortyx klinghardtensis Mourer-Chauviré, Pickford & Senut 2015
- Genus †Paraortyx Gaillard 1908 sensu Brodkorb 1964
  - †Paraortyx lorteti Gaillard 1908
  - †Paraortyx brancoi Gaillard 1908

=== Family †Quercymegapodiidae Mourer-Chauviré 1992 ===
- Genus †Taubacrex de Alvarenga 1988
  - †Taubacrex granivora de Alvarenga 1988
- Genus †Ameripodius de Alvarenga 1995
  - †Ameripodius silvasantosi Alvarenga 1995
  - †Ameripodius alexis Mourer-Chauviré 2000
- Genus †Quercymegapodius Mourer-Chauviré 1992
  - †Quercymegapodius depereti (Gaillard 1908)
  - †Quercymegapodius brodkorbi Mourer-Chauviré 1992

=== Family †Sylviornithidae Mourer-Chauviré et Balouet 2005 ===
- Genus †Megavitiornis Worthy 2000
  - Noble megapode/deep-billed megapode, †Megavitiornis altirostris (Worthy 2000)
- Genus †Sylviornis Poplin 1980
  - New Caledonian giant megapode, †Sylviornis neocaledoniae Poplin 1980

=== Family Megapodiidae Lesson, 1831 ===
- Genus †Mwalau Worthy et al. 2015
  - †Mwalau walterlinii Worthy et al. 2015
- Genus †Ngawupodius Boles & Ivison 1999
  - †Ngawupodius minya Boles & Ivison 1999
- Tribe Alecturini
  - Genus Aepypodius Oustalet 1880
    - Wattled brushturkey, Aepypodius arfakianus (Salvadori 1877) LC
      - A. a. misoliensis Ripley 1957
      - A. a. arfakianus (Salvadori 1877)
    - Waigeo brushturkey, Aepypodius bruijnii (Oustalet 1880) EN B1ab(ii,iii,v)+2ab(ii,iii,v); C2a(ii)
  - Genus Alectura Gray 1831
    - Australian brushturkey, Alectura lathami Gray 1831 LC
      - A. l. purpureicollis (Le Souef 1898)
      - A. l. lathami Gray 1831
  - Genus Leipoa Gould 1840
    - Giant Malleefowl, †Leipoa gallinacea (de Vis 1888) LC
    - Malleefowl, Leipoa ocellata Gould 1840 VU A2bce+3ce+4bce
  - Genus Talegalla Lesson 1828
    - Red-billed brushturkey, Talegalla cuvieri Lesson 1828 LC
      - T. c. cuvieri Lesson 1828
      - T. c. granti Roselaar 1994
    - Black-billed brushturkey, Talegalla fuscirostris Salvadori 1877 LC
      - T. f. fuscirostris Salvadori 1877
      - T. f. occidentis White 1938
      - T. f. aruensis Roselaar 1994
      - T. f. meyeri Roselaar 1994
    - Collared brushturkey, Talegalla jobiensis Meyer 1874 LC
      - T. j. jobiensis Meyer 1874
      - T. j. longicaudus Meyer 1891
- Tribe Megapodiini
  - Genus Macrocephalon Müller 1846
    - Maleo, Macrocephalon maleo Müller 1846 EN A2bcde+3bcde+4bcde
  - Genus Eulipoa Ogilvie-Grant 1893
    - Moluccan megapode, Eulipoa wallacei (Gray 1861) Ogilvie-Grant 1893 VU A2cde+3cde+4cde
  - Genus Megapodius Gaimard 1823 (scrubfowl, scrubhen, megapodes)
    - Consumed scrubfowl, †M. alimentum Steatman 1989a
    - †M. andamanensis Walter 1980 nomen dubium [oospecies]
    - Burnaby's megapode, †M. burnabyi Gray 1861 nomen dubium [oospecies]
    - Pile-builder Scrubfowl, †M. molistructor Balouet & Olson 1989
    - Stair's megapode, †M. stairi
    - Raoul Island scrubfowl, †M. sp.
    - 'Eua scrubfowl/small-fooed megapode, †M. sp.
    - Lifuka scrubfowl, †M. sp.
    - stout Tongan megapode, †M. sp.
    - large Vanuatu megapode, †M. sp.
    - large Solomon Islands, †M. sp.
    - New Caledonia megapode, †M. sp.
    - Loyalty megapode, †M. sp.
    - New Ireland scrubfowl, large Bismarck's megapode, †M. sp.
    - Viti Levu scrubfowl, lost megapode, †Megapodius amissus Worthy 2000
    - Sula megapode, Megapodius bernsteinii Schlegel 1866 VU A2cde+3cde+4cde
    - Philippine megapode, Megapodius cumingii Dillwyn 1853 LC
      - M. c. cumingii Dillwyn 1853
      - M. c. dillwyni Tweeddale 1878
      - M. c. pusillus Tweeddale 1878
      - M. c. tabon Hachisuka 1931
      - M. c. gilbertii Gray 1862
      - M. c. sanghirensis Schlegel 1880
      - M. c. talautensis Roselaar 1994
    - New Guinea scrubfowl, Megapodius decollatus Oustalet 1878 LC
    - Melanesian megapode, Megapodius eremita Hartlaub 1868 LC
    - Dusky megapode, Megapodius freycinet Gaimard 1823 LC
      - M. f. quoyii Gray 1862
      - M. f. freycinet Gaimard 182
      - M. f. oustaleti Roselaar 1994
    - Forsten's megapode, Megapodius forsteni Gray 1847 LC
      - M. f. forsteni Gray 1847
      - M. f. buruensis Stresemann 1914
    - Biak scrubfowl Megapodius geelvinkianus Meyer 1874 VU C2a(ii)
    - Micronesian megapode, Megapodius laperouse Gaimard 1823 EN B1ab(ii,iii,iv,v)
      - M. l. laperouse Gaimard 1823
      - M. l. senex Hartlaub 1868
    - Vanuatu megapode, Megapodius layardi Tristram 1879 VU C2a(i)
    - Nicobar megapode, Megapodius nicobariensis Blyth 1846 VU C2a(i);D1
      - M. n. nicobariensis Blyth 1846
      - M. n. abbotti Oberholser 1919
    - Tongan megapode, Megapodius pritchardii Gray 1864 EN B1ab(v)+2ab(v)
    - Orange-footed scrubfowl Megapodius reinwardt Dumont 1823 LC
      - M. r. reinwardt Dumont 1823
      - M. r. macgillivrayi Gray 1862
      - M. r. tumulus Gould 1842
      - M. r. yorki Mathews 1929
      - M. r. castanonotus Mayr 1938
    - Tanimbar megapode Megapodius tenimberensis Sclater 1883 NT

=== Family Cracidae Rafinesque, 1815 ===
- Genus †Archaealectrornis Crowe & Short 1992
  - †Archaealectrornis sibleyi Crowe & Short 1992
- Genus †Boreortalis Brodkorb 1954
  - †Boreortalis laesslei Brodkorb 1954
- Genus †Palaeonossax Wetmore 1956
  - †Palaeonossax senectus Wetmore 1956
- Subfamily Penelopinae (guans)
  - Genus Aburria Reichenbach 1853
    - Subgenus (Aburria)
      - Wattled guan, Aburria aburri (Lesson 1828) NT
    - Subgenus (Pipile) Bonaparte 1856 (piping guans)
      - Black-fronted piping guan, Aburria jacutinga (von Spix 1825) EN A2cd+3 cd+4 cd
      - Red-throated piping guan, Aburria cujubi (Pelzeln 1858) LC
        - A. c. cujubi (Pelzeln 1858)
        - A. c. nattereri Reichenbach 1861
      - Trinidad piping guan, Aburria pipile (Jacquin 1784) CR C2a(i,ii)
      - Blue-throated piping guan, Aburria cumanensis (Jacquin 1784) LC
        - A. c. cumanensis (Jacquin 1784)
        - A. c. grayi (Pelzeln 1870) NT
  - Genus Chamaepetes Wagler 1832
    - Black guan, Chamaepetes unicolor Salvin 1867 NT
    - Sickle-winged guan, Chamaepetes goudotii (Lesson 1828) LC
      - C. g. sanctaemarthae Chapman 1912
      - C. g. fagani Chubb 1917
      - C. g. tschudii Taczanowski 1886
      - C. g. rufiventris (Tschudi 1843)
      - C. g. goudotii (Lesson 1828)
  - Genus Penelope Merrem 1786 (15 species)
    - Penelope argyrotis (Bonaparte 1856) (Band-tailed Guan) LC
      - P. a. albicauda Phelps & Gilliard 1940
      - P. a. argyrotis (Bonaparte 1856)
      - P. a. colombiana Todd 1912 (Santa Marta guan)
    - Penelope barbata Chapman 1921 (Bearded Guan) VU B1ab(i,ii,iii,v)
    - Penelope ortoni Salvin 1874 (Baudo Guan) EN A2cd+3 cd+4 cd
    - Penelope montagnii (Bonaparte 1856) (Andean Guan) LC
      - P. m. montagnii (Bonaparte 1856)
      - P. m. atrogularis Hellmayr & Conover 1932
      - P. m. brooki Chubb 1917
      - P. m. plumosa von Berlepsch & Stolzmann 1902
      - P. m. sclateri Gray 1860
    - Penelope marail (Müller 1776) (Marail Guan) LC
      - P. m. jacupeba von Spix 1825
      - P. m. marail (Müller 1776)
    - Penelope superciliaris Temminck 1815 (Rusty-margined Guan) LC
      - P. s. superciliaris Temminck 1815
      - P. s. jacupemba von Spix 1825
      - P. s. major Bertoni 1901
    - Penelope dabbenei Hellmayr & Conover 1942 (Red-faced/Dabbene's Guan) LC
    - Penelope purpurascens Wagler 1830 (Crested Guan) LC
      - P. p. purpurascens Wagler 1830
      - P. p. aequatorialis Salvadori & Festa 1900
      - P. p. brunnescens Hellmayr & Conover 1932
    - Penelope perspicax Bangs 1911 (Cauca Guan) EN B1ab(i,ii,iii,v)
    - Penelope albipennis Taczanowski 1878 (White-winged Guan) CR C2a(i)
    - Penelope jacquacu von Spix 1825 (Spix's Guan) LC
      - P. j. granti von Berlepsch 1908
      - P. j. orienticola Todd 1932
      - P. j. jacquacu (Spix's/crested Guan)
      - P. j. speciosa Todd 1915
    - Penelope obscura Temminck 1815 (Dusky-legged Guan) LC
      - P. o. obscura Temminck 1815
      - P. o. bronzina Hellmayr 1914
      - P. o. bridgesi Gray 1860
    - Penelope pileata Wagler 1830 (White-crested Guan) VU A3c
    - Penelope ochrogaster Pelzeln 1870 (Chestnut-bellied Guan) VU B1ab(i,ii,iii,iv,v);C2a(i);D1
    - Penelope jacucaca von Spix 1825 (White-browed Guan) VU A2cd+3 cd+4 cd
  - Genus Penelopina Reichenbach 1861
    - Highland guan, Penelopina nigra (Fraser 1852) VU A2cd+3 cd+4 cd
- Subfamily Cracinae
  - Tribe Ortalidini Donegan 2012
    - Genus Ortalis Merrem 1786 (chachalacas, 12 species)
      - †Ortalis affinis Feduccia & Wilson 1967
      - †Ortalis phengites Wetmore 1923
      - †Ortalis pollicaris Miller 1944
      - †Ortalis tantala Wetmore 1933
      - Ortalis vetula (Wagler 1830) (Plain chachalaca) LC
        - O. v. mccalli Baird 1858
        - O. v. vetula (Wagler 1830)
        - O. v. pallidiventris Ridgway 1887
        - O. v. deschauenseei Bond 1936
      - Ortalis cinereiceps Gray 1867 (Grey-headed chachalaca) LC
      - Ortalis garrula (von Humboldt 1805) (Chestnut-winged chachalaca) LC
      - Ortalis ruficauda Jardine 1847 (Rufous-vented Chachalaca) LC
        - O. r. ruficrissa Sclater & Salvin 1870
        - O. r. ruficauda Jardine 1847
      - Ortalis erythroptera Sclater & Salvin 1870 (Rufous-headed chachalaca) VU B1ab(i,ii,iii,v)
      - Ortalis wagleri Gray 1867 (Rufous-bellied chachalaca) LC
      - Ortalis poliocephala (Wagler 1830) (West Mexican Chachalaca) LC
      - Ortalis canicollis (Wagler 1830) (Chaco chachalaca) LC
        - O. c. canicollis (Wagler 1830)
        - O. c. pantanalensis Cherrie & Reichenberger 1921
      - Ortalis leucogastra (Gould 1843) (White-bellied chachalaca) LC
      - Ortalis guttata (von Spix 1825) (Speckled chachalaca) LC
        - O. g. subaffinis Todd 1932
        - O. g. guttata (von Spix 1825)
      - Ortalis columbiana Hellmayr 1906 (Colombian chachalaca) LC
      - Ortalis araucuan (von Spix 1825) (East Brazilian chachalaca) LC
      - Ortalis squamata Lesson 1829 (Scaled chachalaca) LC
      - Ortalis motmot (Linnaeus 1766) (Little/variable/Guiana chachalaca) LC
      - Ortalis ruficeps (Wagler 1830) (Chestnut-headed chachalaca) LC
      - Ortalis superciliaris Gray 1867 (Buff-browed chachalaca) LC
  - Tribe Oreophasini Bonaparte 1853
    - Genus Oreophasis Gray 1844
      - Horned guan, Oreophasis derbianus Gray 1844 EN C2a(i)
  - Tribe Cracini Rafinesque 1815 (curassows)
    - Genus Crax Linnaeus 1758 (7 species)
      - Crax rubra Linnaeus 1758 (Great curassow) VU A2cd+3 cd+4 cd
        - C. r. rubra Linnaeus 1758
        - C. r. griscomi Nelson 1926
      - Crax alberti Fraser 1852 (Prince Albert's/Blue-billed/knobbed curassow) CR A3bcd
      - Crax daubentoni Gray 1867 (Yellow-knobbed curassow) NT
      - Crax globulosa von Spix 1825 (Globulose/Wattled/Yarrell's curassow) EN A2d+3d+4d;C2a(i)
      - Crax blumenbachii von Spix 1825 (Red-billed curassow) EN B1ab(i,ii,iii,v);C2a(i);D
      - Crax alector Linnaeus 1766 (Black curassow) VU A3c
        - C. a. alector Linnaeus 1766
        - C. a. erythrognatha Sclater & Salvin 1877
      - Crax fasciolata von Spix 1825 (Bare-faced curassow) VU A4c
        - C. f. pinima Pelzeln 1870 CR D
        - C. f. grayi Ogilvie-Grant 1893
        - C. f. fasciolata von Spix 1825
    - Genus Mitu Lesson 1831 (razor-billed curassows)
      - Crestless curassow, Mitu tomentosum (von Spix 1825) NT
      - Salvin's curassow, Mitu salvini Reinhardt 1879 LC
      - Razor-billed curassow, Mitu tuberosum (von Spix 1825) LC
      - Alagoas curassow, Mitu mitu (Linnaeus 1766) EW
    - Genus Nothocrax Burmeister 1856
      - Nocturnal curassow, Nothocrax urumutum (von Spix 1825) LC
    - Genus Pauxi Temminck 1813 (helmeted curassows)
      - Horned curassow, Pauxi unicornis Bond & Meyer de Schauensee 1939 CR A2bcd+3 cd+4bcd
      - Sira curassow, Pauxi koepckeae Weske & Terborgh 1971 CR C2a(i,ii)
      - Helmeted curassow, Pauxi pauxi (Linnaeus 1766) EN C2a(i)
        - P. p. gilliardi Wetmore & Phelps 1943
        - P. p. pauxi (Linnaeus 1766)

=== Family Numididae de Selys Longchamps, 1842 ===
- Genus Guttera Wagler 1832
  - Plumed guineafowl, Guttera plumifera (Cassin 1857) LC
    - G. p. plumifera (Cassin 1857)
    - G. p. schubotzi Reichenow 1912
  - Crested guineafowl, Guttera pucherani (Hartlaub 1861) LC
    - G. p. pucherani (Hartlaub 1861)
    - G. p. verreauxi (Elliot 1870)
    - G. p. sclateri Reichenow 1898
    - G. p. barbata Ghigi 1905
    - G. p. edouardi (Hartlaub 1867)
- Genus Numida Linnaeus 1764
  - Helmeted guineafowl, Numida meleagris (Linnaeus 1758) LC
    - †N. m. sabyi Hartert 1919
    - N. m. galeatus Pallas 1767
    - N. m. meleagris (Linnaeus 1758)
    - N. m. somaliensis Neumann 1899
    - N. m. reichenowi Ogilvie-Grant 1894
    - N. m. mitratus (Pallas 1764)
    - N. m. marungensis Schalow 1884
    - N. m. papillosus Reichenow 1894
    - N. m. coronatus Gurney 1868
- Genus Acryllium Gray 1840
  - Vulturine guineafowl, Acryllium vulturinum (Hardwicke 1834) LC
- Genus Agelastes Bonaparte 1850
  - White-breasted guineafowl, Agelastes meleagrides Bonaparte 1850 VU A2cd+3 cd+4 cd
  - Black guineafowl, Agelastes niger (Cassin 1857) LC

=== Family Odontophoridae Gould, 1844 ===
- Genus †Miortyx Miller 1944
  - †Miortyx teres Miller 1944
  - †Miortyx aldeni Howard 1966
- Genus †Nanortyx Weigel 1963
  - †Nanortyx inexpectatus Weigel 1963
- Genus †Neortyx Holman 1961
  - †Neortyx peninsularis Holman 1961
- Subfamily Ptilopachinae Bowie, Coehn & Crowe 2013
  - Genus Ptilopachus Swainson 1837
    - Nahan's partridge, Ptilopachus nahani (Dubois 1905) VU B2ab(ii,iii,v)
    - Stone partridge, Ptilopachus petrosus (Gmelin 1789) LC
      - P. p. brehmi Neumann 1908
      - P. p. major Neumann 1908
      - P. p. florentiae Ogilvie-Grant 1900
      - P. p. petrosus (Gmelin 1789)
- Subfamily Odontophorinae Gould 1844 (New World quail)
  - Genus Rhynchortyx Ogilvie-Grant 1893
    - Tawny-faced quail, Rhynchortyx cinctus (Salvin 1876) LC
      - R. c. pudibundus Peters 1929
      - R. c. cinctus (Salvin 1876)
      - R. c. australis Chapman 1915
  - Genus Oreortyx (Douglas 1829) Baird 1858
    - Mountain quail, Oreortyx pictus (Douglas 1829) LC
      - O. p. pictus (Douglas 1829) non Peters
      - O. p. plumifer (Gould 1837)
      - O. p. russelli Miller 1946
      - O. p. eremophilus van Rossem 1937
      - O. p. confinis Anthony 1889
  - Genus Dendrortyx Gould 1844
    - Bearded wood partridge, Dendrortyx barbatus Gould 1846 VU A2cd+3 cd+4 cd;B1ab(i,ii,iii,v);C2a(i)
    - Buffy-crowned wood partridge, Dendrortyx leucophrys (Gould 1844) LC
      - D. l. leucophrys (Gould 1844)
      - D. l. hypospodius Salvin 1896
    - Long-tailed wood partridge, Dendrortyx macroura (Jardine & Selby 1828) LC
      - D. m. macroura (Jardine & Selby 1828)
      - D. m. griseipectus Nelson 1897
      - D. m. diversus Friedmann 1943
      - D. m. striatus Nelson 1897
      - D. m. inesperatus Phillips 1966
      - D. m. oaxacae Nelson 1897
  - Genus Philortyx Gould 1846 non Des Murs 1854
    - Banded quail, Philortyx fasciatus (Gould 1844) LC
  - Genus Colinus Goldfuss 1820 (Bobwhites)
    - †Colinus eatoni Shufeldt, 1915
    - †Colinus suilium Brodkorb 1959
    - †Colinus hibbardi Wetmore 1944
    - Crested bobwhite, Colinus cristatus (Linnaeus 1766) LC
      - C. c. mariae Wetmore 1962
      - C. c. panamensis Dickey & van Rossem 1930
      - C. c. decoratus (Todd 1917)
      - C. c. littoralis (Todd 1917)
      - C. c. cristatus (Linnaeus 1766)
      - C. c. horvathi (Madarász 1904)
      - C. c. barnesi Gilliard 1940
      - C. c. sonnini (Temminck 1815)
      - C. c. mocquerysi (Hartert 1894)
      - C. c. leucotis (Gould 1844)
      - C. c. badius Conover 1938
      - C. c. bogotensis Dugand 1943
      - C. c. parvicristatus (Gould 1843)
    - Spot-bellied bobwhite, Colinus leucopogon (Lesson 1842) LC
      - C. l. incanus Friedmann 1944
      - C. l. hypoleucus (Gould 1860)
      - C. l. leucopogon (Lesson 1842)
      - C. l. leylandi (Moore 1859)
      - C. l. sclateri (Bonaparte 1856)
      - C. l. dickeyi Conover 1932
    - Black-throated bobwhite, Colinus nigrogularis (Gould 1843) LC
      - C. n. caboti van Tyne & Trautman 1941
      - C. n. persiccus van Tyne & Trautman 1941
      - C. n. nigrogularis (Gould 1843)
      - C. n. segoviensis Ridgway 1888
    - Northern bobwhite, Colinus virginianus (Linnaeus 1758) NT
      - C. v. graysoni subspecies-group
        - C. v. graysoni (Lawrence 1867)
        - C. v. nigripectus Nelson 1897
      - C. v. pectoralis subspecies-group
        - C. v. pectoralis (Gould 1843)
        - C. v. godmani Nelson 1897
        - C. v. minor Nelson 1901
        - C. v. thayeri Bangs & Peters 1928
      - C. v. coyolcos subspecies-group
        - C. v. nelsoni (Nelson's bobwhite
        - C. v. ridgwayi Brewster 1885
        - C. v. insignis Nelson 1897
        - C. v. salvini Nelson 1897
        - C. v. coyolcos (Statius Müller 1776)
        - C. v. harrisoni Orr & Webster 1968
        - C. v. atriceps (Ogilvie-Grant 1893)
      - C. v. virginianus subspecies-group
        - C. v. aridus (Lawrence 1853) Aldrich 1942
        - C. v. cubanensis (Gray 1846)
        - C. v. floridanus (Coues 1872)
        - C. v. maculatus Nelson 1899
        - C. v. virginianus (Linnaeus 1758)
        - C. v. taylori Lincoln 1915
        - C. v. texanus (Lawrence 1853)
  - Genus Callipepla Wagler 1832 (crested quail)
    - †Callipepla shotwelli (Brodkorb 1958)
    - Scaled quail/blue quail Callipepla squamata (Vigors 1830) LC
      - C. s. pallida Brewster 1881
      - C. s. hargravei Rea 1973
      - C. s. castanogastris Brewster 1883
      - C. s. squamata (Vigors 1830)
    - Elegant quail, Callipepla douglasii (Vigors 1829) LC
      - C. d. douglasii (Vigors 1829)
      - C. d. bensoni Ridgway 1887
      - C. d. vanderbilti (Islas Marías elegant quail)
      - C. d. teres (Friedmann 1943)
    - California quail, Callipepla californica (Shaw 1798) LC
      - C. c. brunnescens (Ridgway 1884)
      - C. c. canfieldae (van Rossem 1939)
      - C. c. californica (Shaw 1798)
      - C. c. catalinensis (Grinnell 1906)
      - C. c. achrustera (Peters 1923)
    - Gambel's quail, Callipepla gambelii (Gambel 1843) LC
      - C. g. gambelii (Gambel 1843)
      - C. g. ignoscens Friedmann 1943
      - C. g. fulvipectus Nelson 1899
      - C. g. stephensi Phillips 1959
  - Genus Cyrtonyx Gould 1844
    - †Cyrtonyx cooki Wetmore, 1934
    - Ocellated quail, Cyrtonyx ocellatus (Gould 1837) VU A3cd
    - Montezuma quail, Cyrtonyx montezumae (Vigors 1830) LC
      - C. m. mearnsi Nelson 1900
      - C. m. montezumae (Vigors 1830)
      - C. m. rowleyi Phillips 1966
      - C. m. sallei Verreaux 1859 NT
  - Genus Dactylortyx (Gambel 1848)Ogilvie-Grant 1893
    - Singing quail, Dactylortyx thoracicus (Gambel 1848) LC
      - D. t. pettingilli Warner & Harrell 1957
      - D. t. thoracicus (Gambel 1848)
      - D. t. sharpei Nelson 1903
      - D. t. paynteri Warner & Harrell 1955
      - D. t. devius Nelson 1898
      - D. t. melodus Warner & Harrell 1957
      - D. t. chiapensis Nelson 1898
      - D. t. dolichonyx Warner & Harrell 1957 [Dactylortyx thoracicus calophonus]
      - D. t. salvadoranus Dickey & van Rossem 1928
      - D. t. fuscus Conover 1937
      - D. t. conoveri Warner & Harrell 1957
  - Genus Odontophorus Vieillot 1816 (wood quail)
    - Spotted wood quail, Odontophorus guttatus (Gould 1838) LC
    - Marbled wood quail, Odontophorus gujanensis (Gmelin 1789) NT
      - O. g. castigatus Bangs 1901
      - O. g. marmoratus (Gould 1843)
      - O. g. medius Chapman 1929
      - O. g. gujanensis (Gmelin 1789)
      - O. g. buckleyi Chubb 1919
      - O. g. rufogularis Blake 1959
      - O. g. pachyrhynchus Tschudi 1844
      - O. g. simonsi Chubb 1919
    - Starred wood quail, Odontophorus stellatus (Gould 1843) LC
    - Spot-winged wood quail, Odontophorus capueira (von Spix 1825) LC
    - Black-eared wood quail, Odontophorus melanotis Salvin 1865 LC
      - O. m. verecundus Peters 1929
      - O. m. melanotis Salvin 1865
    - Rufous-fronted wood quail, Odontophorus erythrops Gould 1859 LC
      - O. e. parambae Rothschild 1897
      - O. e. erythrops Gould 1859
    - Stripe-faced wood quail, Odontophorus balliviani Gould 1846 LC
    - Chestnut wood quail, Odontophorus hyperythrus Gould 1858 NT
    - Dark-backed wood quail, Odontophorus melanonotus Gould 1861 VU B1ab(i,ii,iii,v)
    - Rufous-breasted wood quail, Odontophorus speciosus Tschudi 1843 NT
      - O. s. soderstromii Lönnberg & Rendahl 1922
      - O. s. speciosus Tschudi 1843
      - O. s. loricatus Todd 1932
    - Tacarcuna wood quail, Odontophorus dialeucos Wetmore 1963 VU D2
    - Gorgeted wood quail, Odontophorus strophium (Gould 1844) EN B1ab(i,ii,iii,v)
    - Venezuelan wood quail, Odontophorus columbianus Gould 1850 NT
    - Black-breasted wood quail, Odontophorus leucolaemus Salvin 1867 LC
    - Black-fronted wood quail, Odontophorus atrifrons Allen 1900 VU B1ab(i,ii,iii,v)
      - O. a. atrifrons Allen 1900
      - O. a. variegatus Todd 1919
      - O. a. navai Aveledo & Pons 1952

=== Family Phasianidae Horsfield, 1821 ===
==== Phasianidae incertae sedis ====
- †“Alectoris” pliocaena Tugarinov 1940b
- †“Gallus” beremendensis Jánossy 1976b
- †“Gallus” europaeus Harrison 1978
- Genus †Bantamyx Kuročkin 1982
  - †Bantamyx georgicus Kuročkin 1982
- Genus †Diangallus Hou 1985
  - †Diangallus mious Hou 1985
- Genus †Lophogallus Zelenkov & Kuročkin 2010
  - †Lophogallus naranbulakensis Zelenkov & Kuročkin 2010
- Genus †Megalocoturnix Sánchez Marco 2009
  - †Megalocoturnix cordoni Sánchez Marco 2009
- Genus †Miophasianus Brodkorb 1952 [Miophasianus Lambrecht 1933 nomen nudum; Miogallus Lambrecht 1933]
  - †M. altus (Milne-Edwards 1869) Lambrecht 1933
  - †M. maxima (Lydekker 1893) Brodkorb 1964
  - †M. medius (Milne-Edwards 1869) Lambrecht 1933
- Genus †Palaeocryptonyx Depéret 1892 [Chauvireria Boev 1997; Pliogallus Tugarinov 1940b non Gaillard 1939; Lambrechtia Janossy 1974]
  - †P. donnezani Depéret 1892
  - †P. edwardsi (Depéret 1887) Ballmann 1969a
  - †P. grivensis Ennouchi 1930
  - †P. minor (Jánossy 1974)
  - †P. novaki Sánchez Marco 2009
  - †P. subfrancolinus (Jánossy 1976b)
- Genus †Palaeortyx Milne-Edwards 1869 [Palaeoperdix Milne-Edwards 1869]
  - †P. brevipes Milne-Edwards 1869 emend. Paris 1912
  - †P. gallica Milne-Edwards 1869 non Lydekker 1891
  - †P. joleaudi Ennouchi 1930
  - †P. media Milne-Edwards 1871 nomen nudum
  - †P. phasianoides Milne-Edwards 1869
  - †P. prisca (Milne-Edwards 1869)
  - †P. volans Göhlich & Pavia 2008
- Genus †Plioperdix Kretzoi 1955 [Pliogallus Tugarinov 1940 nec Gaillard 1939]
  - †P. africana Mourer-Chauviré & Geraads 2010
  - †P. crassipes (Gaillard 1939)
  - †P. hungarica (Jánossy 1991) Zelenkov & Panteleyev 2014
  - †P. kormosi (Gaillard 1939)
- Genus †Rustaviornis Burchak-Abramovich & Meladze 1972
  - †Rustaviornis georgicus Burchak-Abramovich & Meladze 1972
- Genus †Schaubortyx Brodkorb 1964
  - †Schaubortyx keltica (Eastman 1905) Brodkorb 1964
- Genus †Shandongornis Yeh 1997
  - †S. shanwanensis Yeh 1997
  - †S. yinansis Hou 2003
- Genus †Shanxiornis Wang et al. 2006
  - †Shanxiornis fenyinis Wang et al. 2006
- Genus †Tologuica Zelenkov & Kuročkin 2009
  - †T. aurorae Zelenkov & Kuročkin 2009
  - †T. karhui Zelenkov & Kuročkin 2009

==== Subfamily Rollulinae ====
- Genus Melanoperdix Jerdon 1864
  - Black wood-partridge, Melanoperdix nigra (Vigors 1829) VU A2c+3c+4c
- Genus Rhizothera Gray 1841
  - Long-billed partridge, Rhizothera longirostris (Temminck 1815) NT
  - Dulit partridge, Rhizothera dulitensis Ogilvie-Grant 1895 VU C2a(i)
- Genus Xenoperdix Dinesen et al. 1994
  - Rubeho forest partridge, Xenoperdix obscuratus Fjeldså & Kiure 2003
  - Udzungwa forest partridge, Xenoperdix udzungwensis Dinesen et al. 1994 EN B1ab(v)
- Genus Rollulus Bonnaterre 1791
  - Crested partridge, Rollulus rouloul (Scopoli 1786) NT
- Genus Caloperdix Blyth 1861
  - Ferruginous partridge, Caloperdix oculeus (Temminck 1815) NT
    - C. o. oculeus (Temminck 1815)
    - C. o. ocellatus (Raffles 1822)
    - C. o. borneensis Ogilvie-Grant 1892
- Genus Arborophila Hodgson 1837, hill partridges
  - Necklaced hill partridge, Arborophila torqueola (Valenciennes 1825) LC
    - A. t. millardi (Baker 1921)
    - A. t. torqueola (Valenciennes 1825)
    - A. t. interstincta Ripley 1951
    - A. t. batemani (Ogilvie-Grant 1906)
    - A. t. griseata Delacour & Jabouille 1930
  - Rufous-throated partridge, Arborophila rufogularis (Blyth 1849) LC
    - A. r. rufogularis (Blyth 1849)
    - A. r. intermedia (Blyth 1855)
    - A. r. tickelli (Hume 1880)
    - A. r. euroa (Bangs & Phillips, JC 1914)
    - A. r. guttata Delacour & Jabouille 1928
    - A. r. annamensis (Robinson & Kloss 1919)
  - White-cheeked partridge, Arborophila atrogularis (Blyth 1849) NT
  - Taiwan partridge, Arborophila crudigularis (Swinhoe 1864) LC
  - Chestnut-breasted partridge, Arborophila mandellii Hume 1874 VU C2a(i)
  - Bar-backed partridge, Arborophila brunneopectus (Blyth 1855) LC
    - A. b. brunneopectus (Blyth 1855)
    - A. b. henrici (Oustalet 1896)
    - A. b. albigula (Robinson & Kloss 1919)
  - Sichuan partridge, Arborophila rufipectus Boulton 1932 EN C2a(i)
  - White-necklaced partridge, Arborophila gingica (Gmelin 1789) NT
    - A. g. gingica (Gmelin 1789)
    - A. g. guangxiensis Zhou, F & Jiang 2008
  - Orange-necked partridge, Arborophila davidi Delacour 1927 NT
  - Chestnut-headed partridge, Arborophila cambodiana Delacour & Jabouille 1928 LC
    - A. c. cambodiana Delacour & Jabouille 1928
    - A. c. chandamonyi Eames, Steinheimer & Bansok 2002
  - Siamese partridge, Arborophila diversa Riley 1930
  - Malaysian/Campbell's partridge Arborophila campbelli (Robinson 1904) LC
  - Roll's partridge, Arborophila rolli (Rothschild 1909) LC
  - Sumatran partridge, Arborophila sumatrana Ogilvie-Grant 1891 LC
  - Grey-breasted partridge, Arborophila orientalis (Horsfield 1821) VU A2cd+3 cd+4 cd;B1ab(ii,iii,v)
  - Chestnut-bellied partridge, Arborophila javanica (Gmelin 1789) LC
    - A. j. javanica (Gmelin 1789)
    - A. j. lawuana Bartels 1938
  - Red-breasted partridge, Arborophila hyperythra (Sharpe 1879) LC
    - A. h. hyperythra (Sharpe 1879)
    - A. h. erythrophrys Sharpe 1890
  - Red-billed partridge, Arborophila rubrirostris (Salvadori 1879) LC
  - Hainan partridge, Arborophila ardens (Styan 1892) VU A2cd;B1ab(ii,iii,iv,v);C2a(i)

==== Subfamily Phasianinae ====
- Genus Tropicoperdix Blyth 1859
  - Chestnut-necklaced partridge, Tropicoperdix charltonii (Eyton 1845) VU C2a(i)
    - T. c. charltonii (Eyton 1845)
    - T. c. atjenensis Meyer de Schauensee & Ripley 1940
    - T. c. graydoni (Sharpe & Chubb 1906) LC
  - Green-legged partridge, Tropicoperdix chloropus Blyth 1859 LC
    - T. c. chloropus Blyth 1859
    - T. c. tonkinensis (Delacour, 1927) LC
    - T. c. cognacqi Delacour & Jabouille 1924
    - T. c. merlini Delacour & Jabouille 1924
    - T. c. vivida (Delacour, 1926)
    - T. c. peninsularis (Meyer de Schauensee 1941)
    - T. c. olivacea Delacour & Jabouille 1928
- Tribe Coturnicini Bonaparte 1854 (Old World Partridges & Quail, Spurfowl)
  - Genus Ammoperdix Gould 1851
    - See-see partridge, Ammoperdix griseogularis (von Brandt 1843) LC
    - Sand partridge, Ammoperdix heyi (Temminck 1825) LC
      - A. h. heyi (Temminck 1825)
      - A. h. nicolli Hartert 1919
      - A. h. cholmleyi Ogilvie-Grant 1897
      - A. h. intermedius Hartert 1917
  - Genus Synoicus Bosc 1792
    - Brown quail, Synoicus ypsilophora Bosc 1792 LC
      - S. y. raaltenii (Müller 1842)
      - S. y. pallidior (Hartert 1897)
      - S. y. saturatior (Hartert 1930)
      - S. y. dogwa (Mayr & Rand 1935)
      - S. y. plumbea (Salvadori 1894)
      - S. y. monticola (Mayr & Rand 1935)
      - S. y. mafulu (Mayr & Rand 1935)
      - S. y. australis (Latham 1801)
      - S. y. ypsilophora Bosc 1792
    - Blue quail, Synoicus adansonii (Verreaux & Verreaux 1851) LC
    - King quail, Synoicus chinensis (Linnaeus 1766) LC
      - E. c. chinensis (Linnaeus 1766)
      - E. c. trinkutensis Richmond 1902
      - E. c. lineata (Scopoli 1786)
      - E. c. novaeguineae Rand 1941
      - E. c. papuensis Mayr & Rand 1936
      - E. c. lepida Hartlaub 1879
      - E. c. australis Gould 1865
      - E. c. colletti Mathews 1912
    - Snow Mountain quail, Synoicus monorthonyx (van Oort 1910) NT
  - Genus Margaroperdix Reichenbach 1853
    - Madagascan partridge, Margaroperdix madagascarensis (Scopoli 1786) LC
  - Genus Coturnix Garsault 1764
    - †Canary Islands quail, Coturnix gomerae Jaume, McMinn & Alcover 1993
    - Common quail, Coturnix coturnix (Linnaeus 1758) LC
      - C. c. coturnix (Linnaeus 1758)
      - C. c. conturbans Hartert 1917
      - C. c. inopinata Hartert 1917
      - C. c. africana Temminck & Schlegel 1849
      - C. c. erlangeri Zedlitz 1912
    - Japanese quail, Coturnix japonica Temminck & Schlegel 1849 NT
    - Stubble quail, Coturnix pectoralis Gould 1837 LC
    - †New Zealand quail, Coturnix novaezelandiae Quoy & Gaimard 1832 EX
    - Rain quail, Coturnix coromandelica (Gmelin 1789) LC
    - Harlequin quail, Coturnix delegorguei Delegorgue 1847 LC
      - C. d. delegorguei Delegorgue 1847
      - C. d. histrionica Hartlaub 1849
      - C. d. arabica Bannerman 1929
  - Genus Tetraogallus Gray 1832 (snowcocks)
    - Caucasian Snowcock, Tetraogallus caucasicus (Pallas 1811) LC
    - Caspian Snowcock, Tetraogallus caspius (Gmelin 1784) LC
      - T. c. tauricus Dresser 1876
      - T. c. caspius (Gmelin, SG 1784)
      - T. c. semenowtianschanskii Zarudny 1908
    - Tibetan Snowcock, Tetraogallus tibetanus Gould 1854 LC
      - T. t. tschimenensis Sushkin 1926
      - T. t. tibetanus Gould 1854
      - T. t. aquilonifer Meinertzhagen & Meinertzhagen 1926
      - T. t. yunnanensis Yang & Xu 1987
      - T. t. henrici Oustalet 1892
      - T. t. przewalskii Bianchi 1907
    - Altai Snowcock, Tetraogallus altaicus (Gebler 1836) LC
    - Himalayan Snowcock, Tetraogallus himalayensis Gray 1843 LC
      - T. h. sauricus Potapov 1993
      - T. h. sewerzowi Zarudny 1910
      - T. h. incognitus Zarudny 1911
      - T. h. himalayensis Gray 1843
      - T. h. grombczewskii Bianchi 1898
      - T. h. koslowi Bianchi 1898
  - Genus Alectoris Kaup, 1829 (rock partridges)
    - †Alectoris bavarica Ballmann, 1969
    - †Alectoris peii Hou, 1982
    - †Alectoris baryosefi Tchernov, 1980
    - Arabian partridge, Alectoris melanocephala (Rüppell, 1835) LC
      - A. m. melanocephala (Rüppell 1835)
      - A. m. guichardi Meinertzhagen 1951
    - Przevalski's partridge, Alectoris magna (Przewalski, 1876) LC
      - A. m. magna (Przewalski 1876)
      - A. m. lanzhouensis Liu, Huang & Wen 2004
    - Rock partridge, Alectoris graeca (Meisner, 1804) NT
      - A. g. saxatilis (Bechstein 1805)
      - A. g. graeca (Meisner 1804)
      - A. g. orlandoi Priolo 1984
      - A. g. whitakeri Schiebel 1934
    - Chukar, Alectoris chukar (Gray, 1830) LC
      - A. c. kleini Hartert 1925
      - A. c. cypriotes Hartert 1917
      - A. c. kurdestanica Meinertzhagen 1923
      - A. c. sinaica (Bonaparte 1858)
      - A. c. werae (Zarudny & Loudon 1904)
      - A. c. koroviakovi (Zarudny 1914)
      - A. c. subpallida (Zarudny 1914)
      - A. c. falki Hartert 1917
      - A. c. dzungarica Sushkin 1927
      - A. c. pallida (Hume 1873)
      - A. c. pallescens (Hume 1873)
      - A. c. chukar (Gray 1830)
      - A. c. potanini Sushkin 1927
      - A. c. pubescens (Swinhoe 1871)
    - Philby's partridge, Alectoris philbyi Lowe, 1934 LC
    - Barbary partridge, Alectoris barbara (Bonnaterre, 1790) LC
      - A. b. koenigi (Reichenow 1899)
      - A. b. spatzi (Reichenow 1895)
      - A. b. barbara (Bonnaterre 1790)
      - A. b. barbata (Reichenow 1896)
    - Red-legged partridge, Alectoris rufa (Linnaeus, 1758) LC
      - A. r. rufa (Linnaeus 1758)
      - A. r. hispanica (Seoane 1894)
      - A. r. intercedens (Brehm 1857)
  - Genus Ophrysia Bonaparte 1856
    - Himalayan quail, Ophrysia superciliosa (Gray 1846) CR D
  - Genus Perdicula Hodgson 1837 (bush-quail)
    - Jungle bush quail, Perdicula asiatica (Latham, 1790) LC
      - P. a. punjaubi Whistler 1939
      - P. a. asiatica (Latham 1790)
      - P. a. vidali Whistler & Kinnear 1936
      - P. a. vellorei Abdulali & Reuben 1965
      - P. a. ceylonensis Whistler 1936
    - Rock bush quail, Perdicula argoondah (Sykes, 1832) LC
      - P. a. meinertzhageni Whistler 1937
      - P. a. argoondah (Sykes 1832)
      - P. a. salimalii Whistler 1943
    - Painted bush quail, Perdicula erythrorhyncha (Sykes, 1832) LC
      - P. e. blewitti (Hume 1874)
      - P. e. erythrorhyncha (Sykes 1832)
    - Manipur bush quail, Perdicula manipurensis Hume 1881 EN C2a(i)
      - P. m. inglisi (Ogilvie-Grant 1909)
      - P. m. manipurensis Hume 1881
  - Genus Pternistis Wagler 1832 (spurfowl)
    - Scaly spurfowl, Pternistis squamatus (Cassin, 1857)
      - P. s. squamatus (Cassin 1857)
      - P. s. schuetti (Cabanis 1880)
      - P. s. maranensis (Mearns 1910)
      - P. s. usambarae (Conover 1928)
      - P. s. uzungwensis (Bangs & Loveridge 1931)
      - P. s. doni (Benson 1939)
    - Ahanta spurfowl, Pternistis ahantensis (Temminck 1854)
      - P. a. hopkinsoni (Bannerman 1934)
      - P. a. ahantensis (Temminck 1854)
    - Grey-striped spurfowl, Pternistis griseostriatus (Ogilvie-Grant, 1890)
    - Hartlaub's spurfowl, Pternistis hartlaubi (Bocage 1870)
    - Double-spurred spurfowl, Pternistis bicalcaratus (Linnaeus, 1766)
      - P. b. ayesha (Hartert 1917)
      - P. b. bicalcaratus (Linnaeus 1766)
      - P. b. ogilviegranti (Bannerman 1922)
    - Heuglin's spurfowl, Pternistis icterorhynchus (Heuglin, 1863)
    - Clapperton's spurfowl, Pternistis clappertoni (Children & Vigors, 1826)
      - P. c. clappertoni (Children & Vigors 1826)
      - P. c. koenigseggi (Madarász 1914)
      - P. c. heuglini (Neumann 1907)
      - P. c. sharpii (Ogilvie-Grant 1892)
      - P. c. nigrosquamatus (Neumann 1902)
      - P. c. gedgii (Ogilvie-Grant 1891)
    - Harwood's spurfowl, Pternistis harwoodi (Blundell & Lovat, 1899)
    - Hildebrandt's spurfowl, Pternistis hildebrandti (Cabanis, 1878)
      - P. h. altumi (Fischer & Reichenow 1884)
      - P. h. hildebrandti (Cabanis 1878)
      - P. h. johnstoni (Shelley 1894)
    - Jackson's spurfowl, Pternistis jacksoni (Ogilvie-Grant, 1891)
    - Handsome spurfowl, Pternistis nobilis (Reichenow, 1908)
    - Mount Cameroon spurfowl, Pternistis camerunensis (Alexander, 1909)
    - Swierstra's spurfowl, Pternistis swierstrai (Roberts, 1929)
    - Chestnut-naped spurfowl, Pternistis castaneicollis (Salvadori, 1888)
      - P. c. ogoensis (Mackworth-Praed 1920)
      - P. c. castaneicollis (Salvadori 1888)
      - P. c. kaffanus (Grant & Mackworth-Praed 1934)
      - P. c. atrifrons (Conover 1930)
    - Erckel's spurfowl, Pternistis erckelii (Rüppell, 1835)
    - Djibouti spurfowl, Pternistis ochropectus (Dorst & Jouanin, 1952)
    - Red-billed spurfowl, Pternistis adspersus (Waterhouse, 1838)
      - P. a. adspersus (Waterhouse 1838)
      - P. a. mesicus Clancey 1996
    - Cape spurfowl, Pternistis capensis (Gmelin, 1789)
    - Natal spurfowl, Pternistis natalensis (Smith, 1833)
      - P. n. neavei (Mackworth-Praed 1920)
      - P. n. natalensis (Smith 1833)
    - Yellow-necked spurfowl, Pternistis leucoscepus (Gray, 1867)
    - Grey-breasted spurfowl, Pternistis rufopictus (Reichenow, 1887)
    - Red-necked spurfowl, Pternistis afer (Statius Müller, 1776)
      - P. a. harterti Reichenow 1909
      - P. a. cranchii (Leach 1818)
      - P. a. leucoparaeus (Fischer & Reichenow 1884)
      - P. a. melanogaster Neumann 1898
      - P. a. afer (Statius Müller 1776)
      - P. a. swynnertoni Sclater 1921
      - P. a. castaneiventer Gunning & Roberts 1911
    - Swainson's spurfowl, Pternistis swainsonii (Smith, 1836)
      - P. s. lundazi White 1947
      - P. s. swainsonii (Smith 1836)
- Tribe Gallini Brehm 1831 (junglefowl, francolins)
  - Genus Bambusicola Gould 1863
    - Mountain bamboo partridge, Bambusicola fytchii Anderson 1871
      - B. f. fytchii Anderson 1871
      - B. f. hopkinsoni Godwin-Austen 1874
    - Chinese bamboo partridge, Bambusicola thoracica (Temminck 1815)
    - Taiwan bamboo partridge, Bambusicola sonorivox (Gould 1863)
  - Genus Gallus Brisson 1760 (junglefowl)
    - †Gallus aesculapii Jánossy 1976
    - †Gallus beremendensis Jánossy 1977
    - †Gallus georgicus Burchak-Abramovich & Potapova, 1995
    - †Gallus imereticus Burchak-Abramovich & Potapova, 1996
    - Giant junglefowl, †Gallus karabachensis Baryšnikov & Potapova 1995
    - †Gallus kudarensis Burčak-Abramovič & Potapova, 1996
    - †Gallus tscheriensis Burčak-Abramovič, 1996
    - †Gallus tamanensis Burčak-Abramovič & Potapova, 1996
    - Red junglefowl, Gallus gallus (Linnaeus, 1758)
      - G. g. murghi Robinson & Kloss 1920
      - G. g. spadiceus (Bonnaterre 1792)
      - G. g. jabouillei Delacour & Kinnear 1928
      - G. g. gallus (Linnaeus 1758)
      - G. g. bankiva Temminck 1813
    - Grey junglefowl, Gallus sonneratii Temminck, 1813
    - Sri Lanka junglefowl, Gallus lafayetii Lesson, 1831
    - Green junglefowl, Gallus varius (Shaw, 1798)
  - Genus Peliperdix Bonaparte 1856
    - Latham's francolin, Peliperdix lathami (Hartlaub, 1854)
      - P. l. lathami (Hartlaub 1854)
      - P. l. schubotzi (Reichenow 1912)
  - Genus Ortygornis Reichenbach, 1852
    - Crested francolin, Ortygornis sephaena (A. Smith, 1836)
      - O. s. grantii (Hartlaub 1866)
      - O. s. rovuma (Gray 1867)
      - O. s. spilogaster (Salvadori 1888)
      - O. s. zambesiae (Mackworth-Praed 1920)
      - O. s. sephaena (Smith 1836)
    - Swamp francolin, Ortygornis gularis (Temminck, 1815)
    - Grey francolin, Ortygornis pondicerianus (Gmelin, 1789)
      - O. p. mecranensis Zarudny & Harms 1913
      - O. p. interpositus Hartert 1917
      - O. p. pondicerianus (Gmelin 1789)
  - Genus Francolinus Stephens 1819 (sensu stricto)
    - Chinese francolin, Francolinus pintadeanus (Scopoli, 1786)
      - F. p. phayrei (Blyth 1843)
      - F. p. pintadeanus (Scopoli 1786)
    - Painted francolin, Francolinus pictus (Jardine & Selby, 1828)
      - F. p. pallidus (Gray 1831)
      - F. p. pictus (Jardine & Selby 1828)
      - F. p. watsoni Legge 1880
    - Black francolin, Francolinus francolinus (Linnaeus, 1766)
      - †F. f. billypayni (Amik Gölü)
      - †F. f. ssp. (Sicily)
      - F. f. francolinus (Linnaeus 1766)
      - F. f. arabistanicus Zarudny & Harms 1913
      - F. f. bogdanovi Zarudny 1906
      - F. f. henrici Bonaparte 1856
      - F. f. asiae Bonaparte 1856
      - F. f. melanonotus Hume 1888
  - Genus Campocolinus Crowe et al., 2020
    - Coqui francolin, Campocolinus coqui (Smith, 1836)
      - C. c. spinetorum (Bates 1928)
      - C. c. maharao (Sclater 1927)
      - C. c. hubbardi (Ogilvie-Grant 1895)
      - C. c. coqui (Smith 1836)
    - Schlegel's francolin, Campocolinus schlegelii (Heuglin, 1863)
    - White-throated francolin, Campocolinus albogularis (Hartlaub, 1854)
      - C. a. albogularis (Hartlaub 1854)
      - C. a. buckleyi (Ogilvie-Grant 1892)
      - C. a. dewittei (Chapin 1937)
  - Genus Scleroptila Blyth 1852
    - Ring-necked francolin, Scleroptila streptophorus (Ogilvie-Grant, 1891)
    - Red-winged francolin, Scleroptila levaillantii (Valenciennes, 1825)
      - S. l. kikuyuensis Ogilvie-Grant 1897)
      - S. l. crawshayi (Ogilvie-Grant 1896)
      - S. l. levaillantii (Valenciennes 1825)
    - Finsch's francolin, Scleroptila finschi (Bocage, 1881)
    - Moorland francolin, Scleroptila psilolaemus (Gray, 1867)
      - S. p. psilolaema (Gray 1867)
      - S. p. elgonensis (Ogilvie-Grant 1891)
    - Orange River francolin, Scleroptila levaillantoides (Smith, 1836)
    - Grey-winged francolin, Scleroptila africanus (Stephens, 1819)
    - Shelley's francolin, Scleroptila shelleyi (Ogilvie-Grant, 1890)
      - S. s. uluensis (Ogilvie-Grant 1892)
      - S. s. macarthuri (van Someren 1938)
      - S. s. shelleyi (Ogilvie-Grant 1890)
      - S. s. whytei (Neumann 1908)
    - Archer's francolin, Scleroptila gutturalis (Rüppell, 1835)
      - S. g. jugularis (Büttikofer 1889)
      - S. g. pallidior (Neumann 1908)
      - S. g. gutturalis (Rüppell 1835)
      - S. g. archeri (Sclater 1927)
      - S. g. lorti (Sharpe 1897)
- Tribe Pavonini Rafinesque 1815 (peafowl)
  - Genus Rheinardia Maingonnat 1882
    - Vietnamese crested argus, Rheinardia ocellata (Elliot 1871)
    - Malayan crested argus, Rheinardia nigrescens Rothschild 1902
  - Genus Argusianus Rafinesque 1815
    - Great argus, Argusianus argus (Linnaeus 1766)
      - A. a. grayi (Elliot 1865)
      - A. a. argus (Linnaeus 1766)
  - Genus Pavo Linnaeus 1758
    - †Pavo archiaci (Gaudry 1862a) Mlíkovský 2002
    - †Pavo bravardi (Gervais 1849) Mourer-Chauviré 1989b
    - Indian peafowl Pavo cristatus Linnaeus 1758
    - Green peafowl, Pavo muticus Linnaeus 1766
      - P. m. spicifer Shaw 1804
      - P. m. imperator Delacour 1949
      - P. m. muticus Linnaeus 1766
  - Genus Afropavo Chapin 1936
    - Congo peacock, Afropavo congensis Chapin 1936
- Tribe Polyplectronini Blyth 1852 (peacock-pheasants)
  - Genus Haematortyx Sharpe, 1879
    - Crimson-headed partridge, Haematortyx sanguiniceps Sharpe, 1879
  - Genus Galloperdix Blyth 1845
    - Painted Spurfowl, Galloperdix lunulata (Valenciennes 1825)
    - Sri Lanka Spurfowl, Galloperdix bicalcarata (Forster 1781)
    - Red Spurfowl, Galloperdix spadicea (Gmelin 1789)
      - G. s. spadicea (Gmelin 1789)
      - G. s. caurina Blanford 1898
      - G. s. stewarti Baker 1919
  - Genus Polyplectron Temminck, 1807 (peacock-pheasants)
    - Palawan peacock-pheasant, Polyplectron emphanum Lesson, 1831
    - Malayan peacock-pheasant, Polyplectron malacense (Scopoli, 1786)
    - Bornean peacock-pheasant, Polyplectron schleiermacheri Brüggemann, 1877
    - Germain's peacock-pheasant, Polyplectron germaini Elliot, 186603)
    - Hainan peacock-pheasant, Polyplectron katsumatae Rothschild, 1906
    - Mountain peacock-pheasant, Polyplectron inopinatum (Rothschild, 1903)
    - Grey peacock-pheasant, Polyplectron bicalcaratum (Linnaeus, 1758)
    - Bronze-tailed peacock-pheasant, Polyplectron chalcurum Lesson, 1831
      - P. c. scutulatum Chasen 1941
      - P. c. chalcurum Lesson 1831
- Genus Ithaginis Wagler 1832
  - Blood pheasant, Ithaginis cruentus (Hardwicke 1821)
    - I. c. cruentus (Hardwicke 1821)
    - I. c. affinis Beebe 1912
    - I. c. tibetanus Baker 1914
    - I. c. kuseri Beebe 1912
    - I. c. marionae Mayr 1941
    - I. c. rocki Riley 1925
    - I. c. clarkei Rothschild 1920
    - I. c. geoffroyi Verreaux 1867
    - I. c. berezowskii Bianchi 1904
    - I. c. beicki Mayr & Birckhead 1937
    - I. c. michaelis Bianchi 1904
    - I. c. sinensis David 1873
- Tribe Lophophorini Gray 1841 (monals & tragopans)
  - Genus Tragopan Cuvier 1829 non Gray 1841
    - Western tragopan, (Tragopan melanocephalus)
    - Satyr tragopan, (Tragopan satyra)
    - Blyth's tragopan, (Tragopan blythii)
      - T. b. molesworthi Baker 1914
      - T. b. blythii (Jerdon 1870)
    - Temminck's tragopan, (Tragopan temminckii)
    - Cabot's tragopan, (Tragopan caboti)
      - T. c. caboti (Gould 1857)
      - T. c. guangxiensis Cheng & Wu 1979
  - Genus Lophophorus Temminck 1813 non Agassiz 1846 (monals)
    - Chinese monal, Lophophorus lhuysii Saint-Hilaire 1866
    - Himalayan monal, Lophophorus impejanus (Latham 1790)
    - Sclater's monal, Lophophorus sclateri Jerdon 1870
      - T. s. arunachalensis Kumar & Singh 2004
      - T. s. sclateri Jerdon 1870
      - T. s. orientalis Davison 1974
  - Genus Lerwa Hodgson 1837
    - Snow partridge, Lerwa lerwa (Hodgson 1833)
  - Genus Tetraophasis Elliot 1871 (monal-partridges)
    - Verreaux's monal-partridge, Tetraophasis obscurus (Verreaux 1869)
    - Szechenyi's monal-partridge, Tetraophasis szechenyii Madarász 1885
- Tribe Phasianini Horsfield, 1821 (pheasants)
  - Genus Perdix Brisson, 1760
    - †Perdix inferna (Kurochkin, 1985)
    - †Perdix margaritae Kuročkin, 1985
    - †Perdix palaeoperdix Mourer-Chauviré, 1975
    - Tibetan partridge, Perdix hodgsoniae (Hodgson, 1856)
      - P. h. caraganae Meinertzhagen & Meinertzhagen, 1926
      - P. h. hodgsoniae (Hodgson, 1856)
      - P. h. sifanica Przewalski, 1876
    - Daurian partridge, Perdix dauurica (Pallas, 1811)
      - P. d. dauurica (Pallas, 1811)
      - P. d. suschkini Poliakov, 1915
    - Grey partridge, Perdix perdix (Linnaeus, 1758)
      - P. p. perdix (Linnaeus, 1758)
      - P. p. armoricana Hartert, 1917
      - P. p. sphagnetorum (Altum, 1894)
      - P. p. hispaniensis Reichenow, 1892
      - †P. p. italica Hartert, 1917
      - P. p. lucida (Altum, 1894)
      - P. p. canescens Buturlin, 1906
      - P. p. robusta Homeyer & Tancre, 1883
  - Genus Syrmaticus Wagler, 1832
    - †Syrmaticus kozlovae Kuročkin, 1985
    - Reeve's pheasant, Syrmaticus reevesi (Gray, 1829)
    - Mikado pheasant, Syrmaticus mikado (Ogilvie-Grant, 1906)
    - Elliot's pheasant, Syrmaticus ellioti (Swinhoe, 1872)
    - Mrs. Hume's pheasant, Syrmaticus humiae (Hume, 1881)
      - S. h. humiae (Hume, 1881)
      - S. h. burmanicus (Oates, 1898)
    - Copper pheasant, Syrmaticus soemmerringii (Temminck, 1830)
      - S. s. scintillans (Gould, 1866)
      - S. s. subrufus (Kuroda, 1919)
      - S. s. intermedius (Kuroda, 1919)
      - S. s. soemmerringii (Temminck, 1830)
      - S. s. ijimae (Dresser, 1902)
  - Genus Phasianus (typical pheasants)
    - †Phasianus lufengia Hou, 1985
    - †Phasianus yanshansis Huang & Hou, 1984
    - Green pheasant Phasianus versicolor Vieillot, 1825
      - P. v. robustipes Kuroda, 1919
      - P. v. tohkaidi Momiyama, 1922
      - P. v. tanensis Kuroda, 1919
      - P. v. versicolor Vieillot, 1825
    - Common pheasant, Phasianus colchicus Linnaeus, 1758
      - P. c. colchicus subspecies-group
        - P. c. septentrionalis Lorenz, 1889
        - P. c. colchicus Linnaeus, 1758
        - P. c. talischensis Lorenz, 1889
        - P. c. persicus Severtsov, 1875
      - P. c. mongolicus subspecies-group
        - P. c. mongolicus von Brandt, 1844
        - P. c. hagenbecki Rothschild, 1901
        - P. c. edzinensis Sushkin, 1926
        - P. c. turcestanicus Lorenz, 1896
      - P. c. principalis-chrysomelas subspecies-group
        - P. c. principalis Sclater, 1885
        - P. c. chrysomelas Severtsov, 1875
        - P. c. zarudnyi Buturlin, 1904
        - P. c. bianchii Buturlin, 1904
        - P. c. zerafschanicus Tarnovski, 1891
      - P. c. tarimensis subspecies-group
        - P. c. shawii Elliot, 1870
        - P. c. tarimensis Pleske, 1889
      - P. c. torquatus subspecies-group
        - P. c. vlangalii Przewalski, 1876
        - P. c. strauchi Przewalski, 1876
        - P. c. sohokhotensis Buturlin, 1908
        - P. c. satscheuensis Pleske, 1892
        - P. c. alaschanicus Alphéraky & Bianchi, 1908
        - P. c. kiangsuensis Buturlin, 1904
        - P. c. karpowi Buturlin, 1904
        - P. c. pallasi Rothschild, 1903
        - P. c. suehschanensis Bianchi, 1906
        - P. c. elegans Elliot, 1870
        - P. c. decollatus Swinhoe, 1870
        - P. c. rothschildi La Touche, 1922
        - P. c. takatsukasae Delacour, 1927
        - P. c. torquatus Gmelin, 1789
        - P. c. formosanus Elliot, 1870
  - Genus Chrysolophus Gray, 1834
    - Golden pheasant, Chrysolophus pictus (Linnaeus, 1758)
    - Lady Amherst's pheasant, Chrysolophus amherstiae (Leadbeater, 1829)
  - Genus Crossoptilon Hodgson 1838
    - Brown eared pheasant, Crossoptilon mantchuricum Swinhoe, 1863
    - Blue eared pheasant, Crossoptilon auritum (Pallas, 1811)
    - Tibetan eared pheasant, Crossoptilon harmani Elwes, 1881
    - White-eared pheasant, Crossoptilon crossoptilon (Hodgson, 1838)
      - C. c. dolani Meyer de Schauensee, 1937
      - C. c. crossoptilon (Hodgson, 1838)
      - C. c. lichiangense Delacour, 1945
      - C. c. drouynii Verreaux, 1868
  - Genus Catreus Cabanis, 1851
    - Cheer pheasant, Catreus wallichi (Hardwicke, 1827)
  - Genus Lophura Fleming, 1822
    - †Lophura wayrei Harrison & Walker, 1982
    - Hoogerwerf's pheasant, Lophura hoogerwerfi (Chasen, 1939)
    - Salvadori's pheasant, Lophura inornata (Salvadori, 1879)
    - Crestless fireback, Lophura erythrophthalma (Raffles, 1822)
      - Malayan crestless fireback, L. e. erythrophthalma (Raffles, 1822)
      - Bornean crestless fireback, L. e. pyronota (Gray, 1841)
    - Siamese fireback, Lophura diardi (Bonaparte, 1856)
    - Crested fireback, Lophura ignita (Shaw, 1798)
      - Lesser Bornean crested fireback, L. i. ignita (Shaw, 1798)
      - Greater Bornean crested fireback, L. i. nobilis (Sclater, 1863)
      - Vieilott's crested fireback, L. i. rufa (Raffles, 1822)
      - Delacour's crested fireback, L. i. macartneyi (Temminck, 1813)
    - Bulwer's pheasant, Lophura bulweri (Sharpe, 1874)
    - Swinhoe's pheasant, Lophura swinhoii (Gould, 1863)
    - Edward's pheasant, Lophura edwardsi (Oustalet, 1896)
    - Kalij pheasant, L. leucomelanos (Latham, 1790)
      - White-crested kalij pheasant, L. l. hamiltoni (Gray, 1829)
      - Nepal kalij pheasant, L. l. leucomelanos (Latham, 1790)
      - Black-backed kalij pheasant, L. l. melanota (Hutton, 1848)
      - Black kalij pheasant, L. l. moffitti (Hachisuka, 1938)
      - Black-breasted kalij pheasant, L. l. lathami (Gray, 1829)
      - William's kalij pheasant, L. l. williamsi (Oates, 1898)
      - Oates' kalij pheasant, L. l. oatesi (Ogilvie-Grant, 1893)
      - Crawfurd's kalij pheasant, L. l. crawfurdi (Gray, 1829)
      - Lineated kalij pheasant, L. l. lineata (Vigors, 1831)
    - Silver pheasant, L. nycthemera (Linnaeus, 1758)
      - L. n. omeiensis Cheng, Chang & Tang, 1964
      - L. n. rongjiangensis Tan & Wu, 1981
      - L. n. nycthemera (Linnaeus 1758)
      - L. n. fokiensis Delacour, 1948
      - L. n. whiteheadi (Ogilvie-Grant, 1899)
      - L. n. occidentalis Delacour, 1948
      - L. n. rufipes (Oates, 1898)
      - L. n. jonesi (Oates, 1903)
      - L. n. ripponi (Sharpe, 1902)
      - L. n. beaulieui Delacour, 1948
      - L. n. berliozi (Delacour & Jabouille, 1928)
      - L. n. beli (Oustalet, 1898)
      - L. n. annamensis (Ogilvie-Grant, 1906)
      - L. n. lewisi (Delacour & Jabouille, 1928)
      - L. n. engelbachi Delacour, 1948
- Tribe Tetraonini Leach, 1820 [Meliperdicinae] (grouse & turkeys)
  - Genus Pucrasia Gray, 1841
    - Koklass pheasant, Pucrasia macrolopha (Lesson, 1829)
      - P. m. castanea Gould, 1855
      - P. m. biddulphi Marshall, 1879
      - P. m. macrolopha (Lesson, 1829)
      - P. m. nipalensis Gould, 1855
      - P. m. meyeri Madarász, 1886
      - P. m. ruficollis David & Oustalet, 1877
      - P. m. xanthospila Gray, 1864
      - P. m. joretiana Heude, 1883
      - P. m. darwini Swinhoe, 1872
  - Genus Meleagris Linnaeus, 1758 (turkeys)
    - †Meleagris anza (Howard, 1963)
    - †Meleagris californica (Miller, 1909)
    - †Meleagris celer Marsh, 1872
    - †Meleagris crassipes Rea, 1980
    - †Meleagris leopoldi Miller & Bowman, 1956
    - †Meleagris progenies (Brodkorb, 1964)
    - †Meleagris superba Cope, 1870c
    - †Meleagris tridens Wetmore, 1931
    - Ocellated turkey, Meleagris ocellata Cuvier, 1820
    - Wild turkey, Meleagris gallopavo Linnaeus, 1758
      - M. g. silvestris Vieillot, 1817
      - M. g. osceola Scott, 1890
      - M. g. intermedia Sennett, 1879
      - M. g. mexicana Gould, 1856
      - M. g. merriami Nelson, 1900
      - M. g. gallopavo Linnaeus, 1758
  - Genus Bonasa Stephens, 1819
    - †Bonasa dalianensis (Hou, 1990)
    - †Bonasa nini Sánchez Marco, 2009
    - Ruffed grouse, Bonasa umbellus (Linnaeus, 1766)
      - B. u. yukonensis Grinnell, 1916
      - B. u. umbelloides (Douglas, 1829)
      - B. u. labradorensis Ouellet, 1991
      - B. u. castanea Aldrich & Friedmann, 1943
      - B. u. obscura Todd 1947
      - B. u. sabini (Douglas, 1829)
      - B. u. brunnescens Conover, 1935
      - B. u. togata (Linnaeus, 1766)
      - B. u. mediana Todd, 1940
      - B. u. phaios Aldrich & Friedmann, 1943
      - B. u. incana Aldrich & Friedmann, 1943
      - B. u. monticola Todd, 1940
      - B. u. umbellus (Linnaeus, 1766)
  - Genus Tetrastes Keyserling & Blasius, 1840
    - Chinese grouse, Tetrastes sewerzowi Przewalski, 1876
      - T. s. sewerzowi Przewalski, 1876
      - T. s. secundus Riley, 1925
    - Hazel grouse, Tetrastes bonasia (Linnaeus, 1758)
      - T. b. rhenanus (Kleinschmidt, 1917)
      - T. b. styriacus (von Jordans & Schiebel, 1944)
      - T. b. schiebeli (Kleinschmidt, 1943)
      - T. b. rupestris (Brehm, 1831)
      - T. b. bonasia (Linnaeus, 1758)
      - T. b. griseonota Salomonsen, 1947
      - T. b. sibiricus Buturlin, 1916
      - T. b. kolymensis Buturlin, 1916
      - T. b. amurensis Riley, 1916
      - T. b. yamashinai Momiyama, 1928
      - T. b. vicinitas Riley, 1915
  - Genus Centrocercus Swainson, 1832 (sage grouse)
    - Greater sage-grouse, Centrocercus urophasianus (Bonaparte, 1827)
    - Gunnison sage-grouse, Centrocercus minimus Young et al., 2000
  - Genus Dendragapus Elliot, 1864
    - †Dendragapus gilli (Shufeldt, 1891) Brodkorb 1964
    - †Dendragapus lucasi Jehl, 1969
    - Dusky grouse, Dendragapus obscurus (Say, 1822)
      - D. o. richardsonii (Douglas, 1829)
      - D. o. pallidus Swarth, 1931
      - D. o. oreinus Behle & Selander, 1951
      - D. o. obscurus (Say, 1822)
    - Sooty grouse, Dendragapus fuliginosus (Ridgway, 1873)
      - D. f. sitkensis Swarth, 1921
      - D. f. fuliginosus (Ridgway, 1873)
      - D. f. sierrae Chapman, 1904
      - D. f. howardi Dickey & van Rossem, 1923
  - Genus Tympanuchus Gloger, 1841 (prairie-chickens)
    - †Tympanuchus lulli Shuefeldt, 1915
    - †Tympanuchus stirtoni Miller, 1944
    - †Tympanuchus lurasi (Shufeldt, 1891)
    - †Tympanuchus nanus (Shufeldt, 1892)
    - Lesser prairie-chicken Tympanuchus pallidicinctus (Ridgway, 1873)
    - Greater prairie-chicken, Tympanuchus cupido (Linnaeus, 1758)
      - Attwater's prairie-chicken, T. c. attwateri Bendire, 1893
      - T. c. pinnatus (Brewster, 1885)
      - Heath Hen, T. c. cupido (Linnaeus, 1758) (extinct, 1932)
    - Sharp-tailed grouse, Tympanuchus phasianellus (Linnaeus, 1758)
      - T. p. caurus (Friedmann, 1943)
      - T. p. kennicotti (Suckley, 1861)
      - T. p. phasianellus (Linnaeus, 1758)
      - Columbian sharp-tailed grouse, T. p. columbianus (Ord, 1815)
      - New Mexico sharp-tailed grouse, †T. p. hueyi Dickerman & Hubbard, 1994
      - T. p. jamesi (Lincoln, 1917)
      - T. p. campestris (Ridgway, 1884)
  - Genus Lagopus Brisson, 1760
    - †Lagopus atavus (Jánossy, 1974a)
    - †Lagopus balcanicus Boev, 1995
    - White-tailed ptarmigan, Lagopus leucura (Richardson, 1831)
      - L. l. peninsularis Chapman, 1902
      - L. l. leucura (Richardson, 1831)
      - L. l. rainierensis Taylor, 1920
      - L. l. saxatilis Cowan, 1939
      - L. l. altipetens Osgood, 1901
    - Red grouse, Lagopus scotica (Latham, 1787)
    - Willow ptarmigan, Lagopus lagopus (Linnaeus, 1758)
      - †L. l. noaillensis Mourer-Chauviré, 1975
      - L. l. variegata Salomonsen, 1936
      - L. l. lagopus (Linnaeus, 1758)
      - L. l. rossica Serebrovski, 1926
      - L. l. koreni Thayer & Bangs, 1914
      - L. l. maior Lorenz, 1904
      - L. l. brevirostris Hesse, 1912
      - L. l. kozlowae Portenko, 1931
      - L. l. sserebrowsky Domaniewski, 1933
      - L. l. okadai Momiyama, 1928
      - L. l. alascensis Swarth, 1926
      - L. l. alexandrae Grinnell, 1909
      - L. l. leucoptera Taverner, 1932
      - L. l. alba (Gmelin, 1789)
      - L. l. ungavus Riley, 1911
      - L. l. alleni Stejneger, 1884
    - Rock ptarmigan, Lagopus muta (Montin, 1781)
      - †L. m. correzensis Mourer-Chauviré, 1975
      - L. m. muta (Montin, 1781)
      - L. m. millaisi Hartert, 1923
      - L. m. helvetica (Thienemann, 1829)
      - L. m. pyrenaica Hartert, 1921
      - L. m. pleskei Serebrovski, 1926
      - L. m. nadezdae Serebrovski, 1926
      - L. m. gerasimovi Red'kin, 2005
      - L. m. ridgwayi Stejneger, 1884
      - L. m. kurilensis Kuroda, 1924
      - L. m. japonica Clark, 1907
      - L. m. evermanni Elliot, 1896
      - L. m. townsendi Elliot, 1896
      - L. m. atkhensis Turner, 1882
      - L. m. yunaskensis Gabrielson & Lincoln, 1951
      - L. m. nelsoni Stejneger, 1884
      - L. m. dixoni Grinnell, 1909
      - L. m. rupestris (Gmelin, 1789)
      - L. m. welchi Brewster, 1885
      - L. m. saturata Salomonsen, 1950
      - L. m. macruros Schiøler, 1925
      - L. m. reinhardi (Brehm, 1824)
      - L. m. hyperborea Sundevall, 1845
      - L. m. islandorum (Faber, 1822)
  - Genus Falcipennis Elliot, 1864
    - Siberian grouse, Falcipennis falcipennis (Hartlaub, 1855)
  - Genus Canachites Stejneger, 1885
    - Spruce grouse, Canachites canadensis
      - C. c. osgoodi (Bishop, 1900)
      - C. c. atratus (Grinnell, 1910)
      - C. c. canadensis (Linnaeus, 1758)
      - C. c. canace (Linnaeus, 1766)
      - C. c. franklinii (Douglas, 1829)
      - C. f. isleibi (Dickerman & Gustafson, 1996)
  - Genus Tetrao Linnaeus, 1758 (capercallies)
    - †Tetrao conjugens Jánossy, 1974
    - †Tetrao macropus Jánossy, 1976
    - †Tetrao praeurogallus Jánossy, 1969
    - †Tetrao rhodopensis Boev, 1998
    - Black-billed capercaillie, Tetrao urogalloides Middendorf, 1853 [Tetrao parvirostris Bonaparte 1856]
      - T. u. urogalloides Middendorf, 1853
      - T. u. kamtschaticus Kittlitz, 1858
    - Western capercaillie, Tetrao urogallus Linnaeus, 1758
      - Cantabrian capercaillie, Tetrao urogallus cantabricus Castroviejo, 1967
      - T. u. aquitanicus Ingram, 1915
      - T. u. crassirostris Brehm, 1831
      - T. u. volgensis Buturlin, 1907
      - T. u. urogallus Linnaeus, 1758
      - T. u. kureikensis Buturlin, 1927
      - T. u. uralensis Nazarov, 1886
      - T. u. taczanowskii (Stejneger, 1885)
  - Genus Lyrurus Swainson, 1832 (black grouse)
    - Caucasian grouse, Lyrurus mlokosiewiczi (Taczanowski, 1875)
    - Black grouse, Lyrurus tetrix (Linnaeus, 1758)
      - †L. t. longipes Mourer-Chauviré, 1975
      - L. t. britannicus Witherby & Lönnberg, 1913
      - L. t. tetrix (Linnaeus, 1758)
      - L. t. viridanus (Lorenz, 1891)
      - L. t. baikalensis (Lorenz, 1911)
      - L. t. mongolicus (Lönnberg, 1904)
      - L. t. ussuriensis (Kohts, 1911)

== Summary of 2006 IUCN Red List categories ==

Conservation status [v2017.3, the data is current as of 8 May 2018]:

EX - extinct,
EW - extinct in the wild
CR - critically endangered
EN - endangered
VU - vulnerable
NT - near threatened
LC - least concern
DD - data deficient
NE - not evaluated
