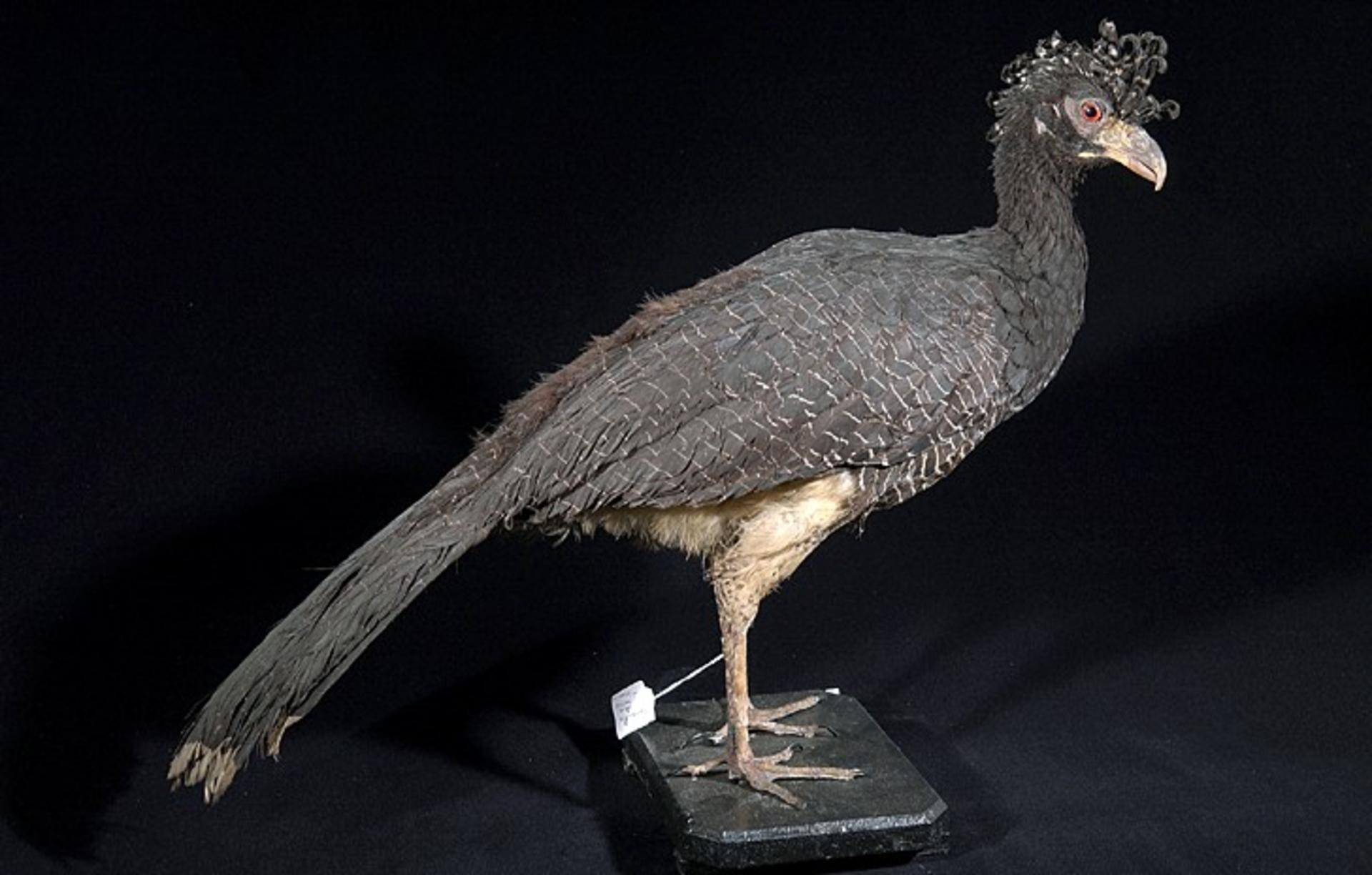
- Preserved specimen of female at Naturalis Biodiversity Center

Conservation status
- Critically Endangered (IUCN 3.1)

Scientific classification
- Kingdom: Animalia
- Phylum: Chordata
- Class: Aves
- Order: Galliformes
- Family: Cracidae
- Genus: Crax
- Species: C. fasciolata
- Subspecies: C. f. pinima

Trinomial name
- Crax fasciolata pinima Pelzeln, 1870

= Belem curassow =

Subspecies of bird

The Belem curassow (Crax fasciolata pinima) is a highly endangered subspecies of curassow endemic to Brazil. It is known as the Mytunxî in the Tupi language, the International Union for Conservation of Nature Red List and BirdLife International have described it as a separate species since 2014, though some authorities including the International Ornithological Congress (IOC) still consider it a subspecies. This bird is critically endangered as its highly limited range is located within the most deforested part of Amazonia. As with its relative, the Alagoas curassow, it was considered extinct in the wild (albeit with only five individuals in captivity) for many years due to most of its vital habitat being destroyed. However, the species was still listed as "critically endangered" by the International Union for Conservation of Nature as suitable though very scant habitat remained. After over 40 years of no confirmed wild records, a research team with the assistance of Pirahã guides managed to rediscover several in the Gurupi Biological Reserve in December 2017. A recording of the birds' alarm calls was also taken and posted online.
