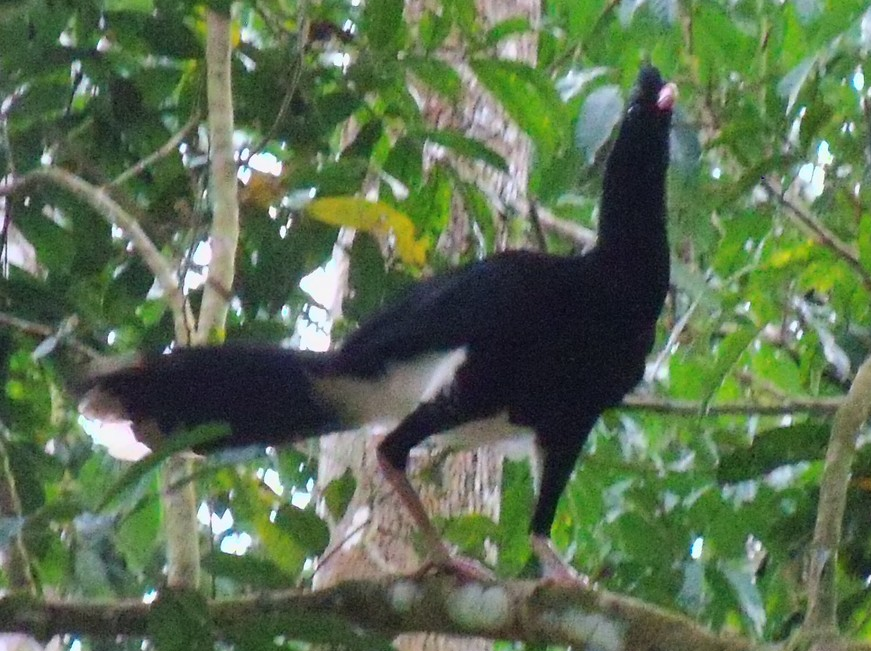

Conservation status
- Least Concern (IUCN 3.1)

Scientific classification
- Domain: Eukaryota
- Kingdom: Animalia
- Phylum: Chordata
- Class: Aves
- Order: Galliformes
- Family: Cracidae
- Genus: Mitu
- Species: M. salvini

Binomial name
- Mitu salvini Reinhardt, 1879

Synonyms
- Crax salvini (Reinhardt, 1879)

= Salvin's curassow =

Species of bird

Salvin's curassow (Mitu salvini) is a species of bird in the family Cracidae, the chachalacas, guans, and curassows. It is found in Colombia, Ecuador, and Peru.

== Taxonomy and systematics ==
Salvin's curassow for a time was placed in genus Crax but genetic data confirm that Mitu is a valid genus. Salvin's curassow is monotypic.

== Description ==
Salvin's curassow is 75 to 89 cm (2.5 to 2.9 ft) long and weighs about 3,100 g (6.8 lb). It is mostly black with little gloss. The belly and the end of the tail feathers are white. It has an erectile crest that is usually carried flat.

== Distribution and habitat ==
Salvin's curassow is found east of the Andes in southern Colombia, eastern Ecuador, and northern Peru. It inhabits humid terra firme, primarily at the beginning of the wet season (March to April), and várzea before and after that period. It prefers primary forest. In elevation it ranges as high as about 400 m (1,300 ft) in Ecuador and 600 m (2,000 ft) in Colombia. Historically it had been found up to about 900 m (3,000 ft).

== Behavior ==
=== Movement ===
Salvin's curassow is basically sedentary, though pairs may shift their territories seasonally in response to food availability.

=== Feeding ===
Salvin's curassow forages singly, in pairs, or in family groups, mostly on the ground. Its diet is about 70% fruits, 10% seeds, and the other 20% flowers, leaves, invertebrates, and other items. It takes in sand and small stones to aid digestion and has been seen scavenging animal remains.

=== Breeding ===
Pairs of Salvin's curassow appear to stay together year round and not be strongly territorial. In Colombia the nesting season is January to May or June. Males build several nests from which the female chooses one. The clutch size is two eggs.

=== Vocalization ===
The Salvin Curassow's "booming" song is rendered "mmm mmmMMMM ... BMM’mmmm-mmmm". The male sings mostly at dawn and at night. The female also sings a huskier version. Other vocalizations include a "pieew, pieew" alarm note, a "goorh, goorh" threat response, and a "coh coh" contact call.

== Status ==
The IUCN has assessed Salvin's curassow as being of Least Concern. Hunting is the primary threat, and the species is scarce near human settlements though generally common in less accessible areas.
