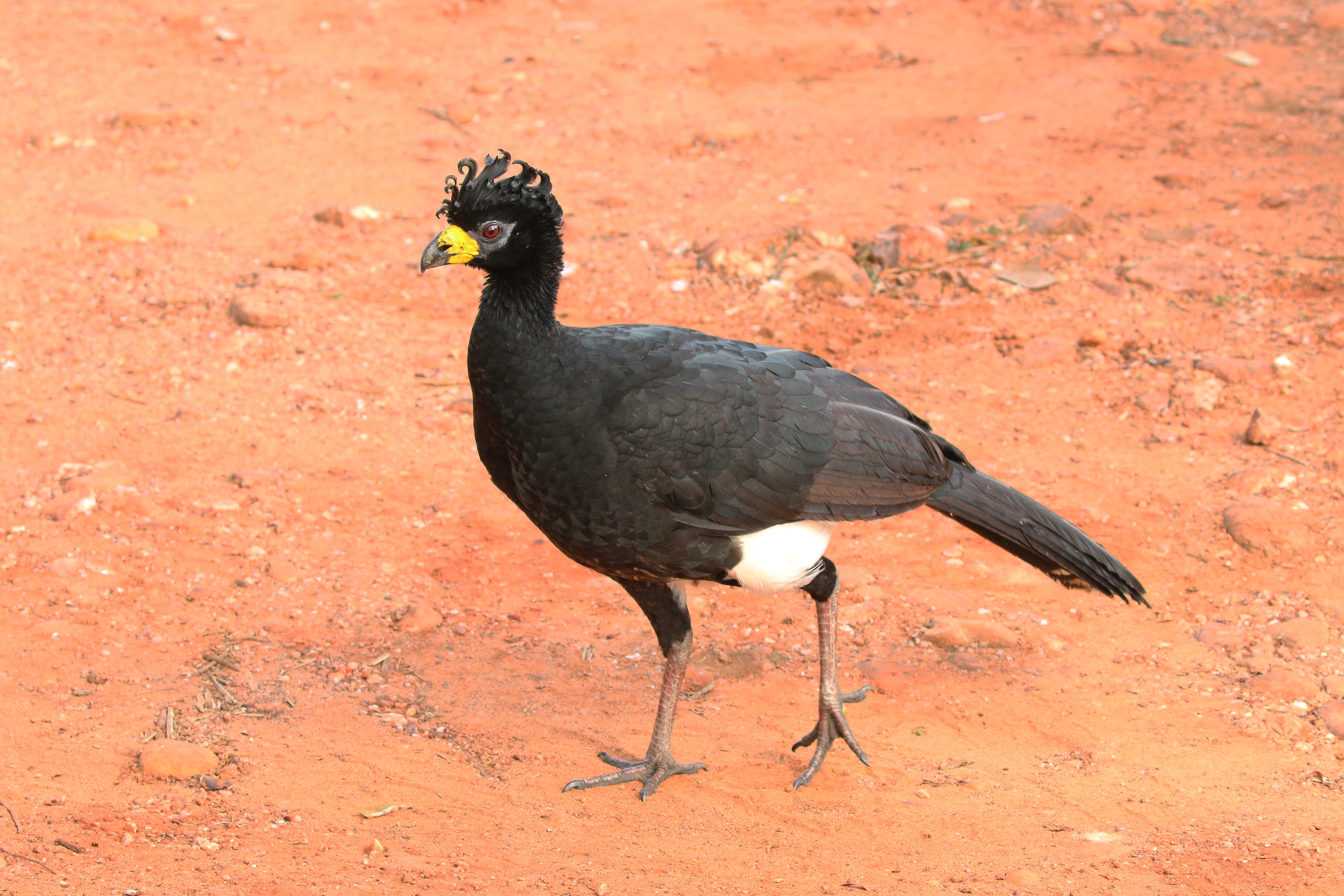
- Male
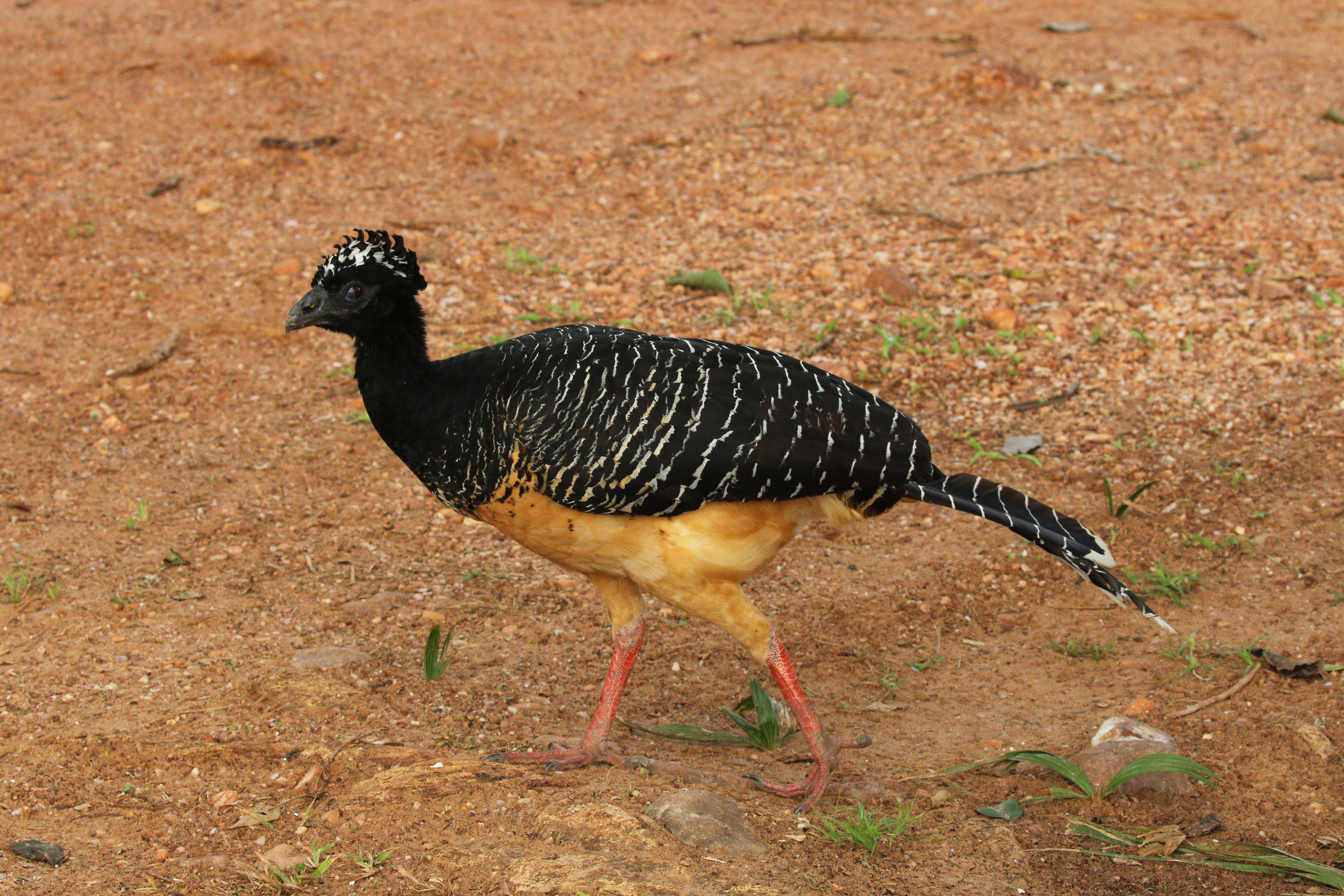
- Female; Both in the Pantanal, Brazil

Conservation status
- Vulnerable (IUCN 3.1)

Scientific classification
- Kingdom: Animalia
- Phylum: Chordata
- Class: Aves
- Order: Galliformes
- Family: Cracidae
- Genus: Crax
- Species: C. fasciolata

Binomial name
- Crax fasciolata Spix, 1825

= Bare-faced curassow =

Species of bird

The bare-faced curassow (Crax fasciolata) is a species of bird in the family Cracidae, the chachalacas, guans, curassows, etc. It is found in Brazil, Paraguay, and eastern Bolivia, and extreme northeast Argentina, in the cerrado, pantanal, and the southeastern region of the Amazon basin. Its natural habitats are subtropical or tropical dry forest and subtropical or tropical moist lowland forest.

== Taxonomy ==
There are three currently recognized subspecies following the IOC,

- C. f. fasciolata (Spix, 1825) – fasciated curassow – lowlands of Brazil to Paraguay and northeast Argentina
- C. f. grayi (Ogilvie-Grant, 1893) – eastern Bolivia
- C. f. pinima (Pelzeln, 1870) – northeastern Brazil

== Description ==
The bare-faced curassow is a large bird reaching a length of 82 to 92 centimetres (32 to 36 in). The sexes differ in appearance. The male has black upper parts faintly glossed with greenish-olive, with an unfeathered face with yellowish bare skin, a small black crest, and white underparts. The female, on the other hand, has a black head, throat, neck and upper mantle, and a black and white barred crest. The remainder of the upper parts are greenish-black barred with white or ochre. The black tail is tipped with white or ochre and the underparts are black with ochre barring on the breast, paling to a yellowish or ochre belly. The facial skin on females is blackish.

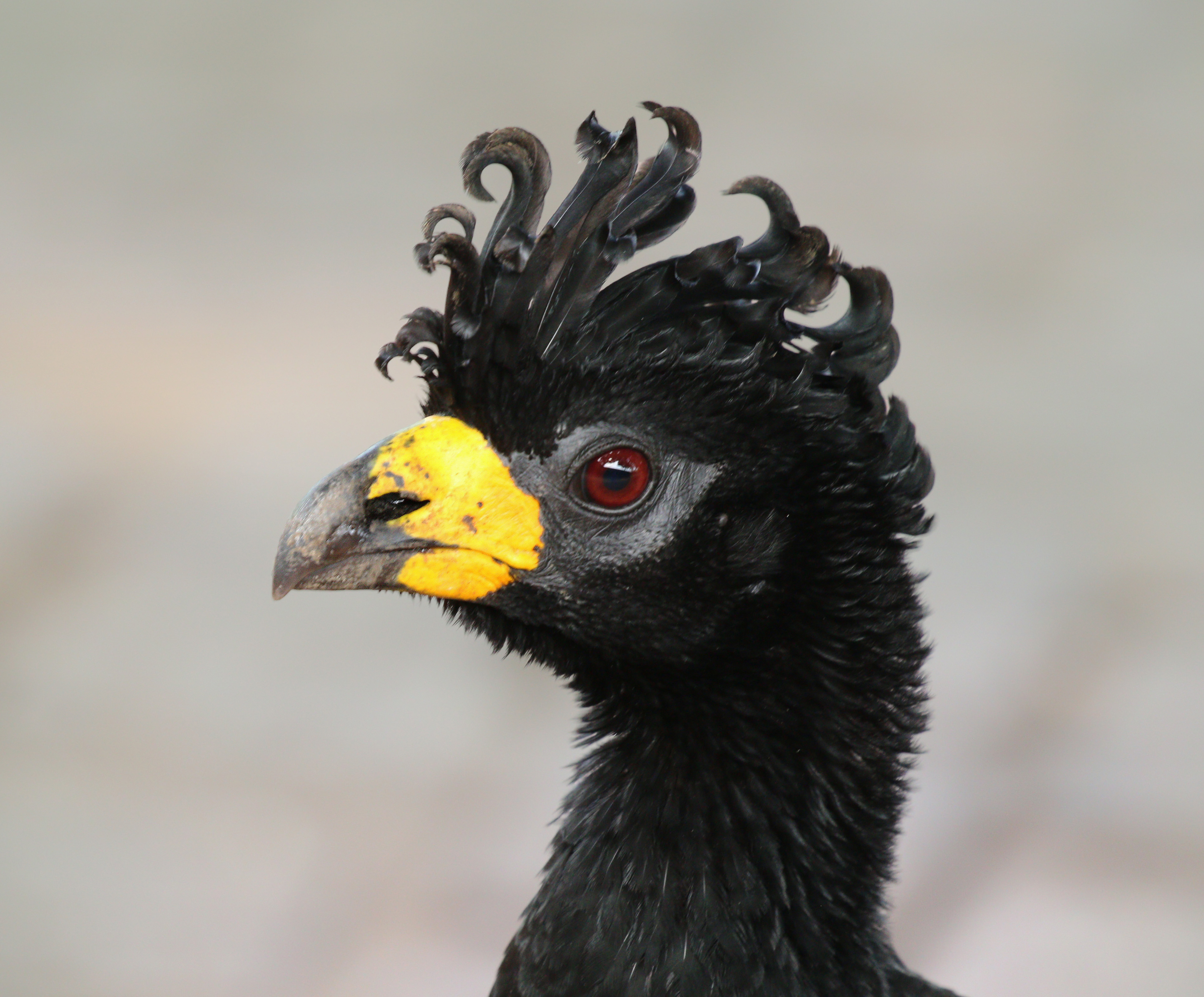
Head of male
Pantanal, Brazil

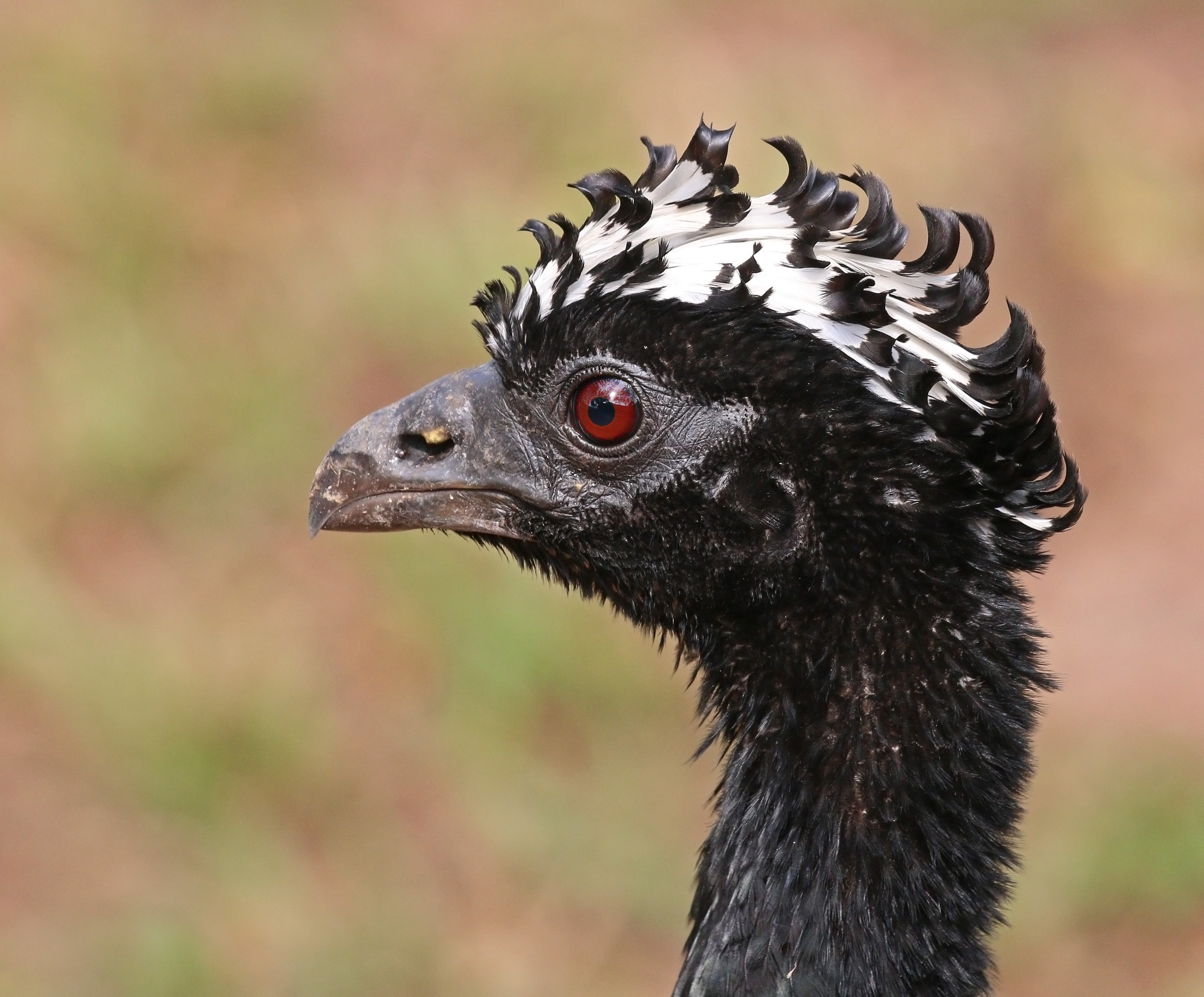
Head of female
Pantanal, Brazil

== Behaviour ==
The bare-faced curassow lives in moist, semi-deciduous and gallery forests, often near the fringes of the woodland. It mainly feeds on fruit, but seeds, flowers and small invertebrates are also eaten. Breeding takes place in the summer in the southern part of its range, with the nests being platforms of sticks in trees.

== Status ==
The bare-faced curassow has a wide range and is fairly numerous in parts of its range; however, it is subject to hunting and to the destruction of its habitat and the total population is likely to be declining quite rapidly. The International Union for Conservation of Nature has assessed its conservation status as "vulnerable".
