= Mwalau =

Mwalau Temporal range: Holocene

Scientific classification
- Kingdom: Animalia
- Phylum: Chordata
- Class: Aves
- Order: Galliformes
- Family: Megapodiidae
- Genus: †Mwalau; Worthy, Hawkins, Bedford & Spriggs, 2015
- Species: †M. walterlinii

Binomial name
- †Mwalau walterlinii Worthy, Hawkins, Bedford & Spriggs, 2015

Species of bird

Mwalau walterlinii is an extinct species of megapode from Vanuatu, and the only species in the genus Mwalau. The holotype and only known specimen is from the Teouma archeological site on the island of Efate. It was built in similar proportion to the extant Australian brushturkey, and, like that species, could fly. It is distinguishable from other extant megapodes by its large size, though it is smaller than the extinct giant malleefowl.

The scientific and common name honor the first Prime Minister of Vanuatu, Walter Lini. The name of the genus comes from the Laipta name for megapodes.
