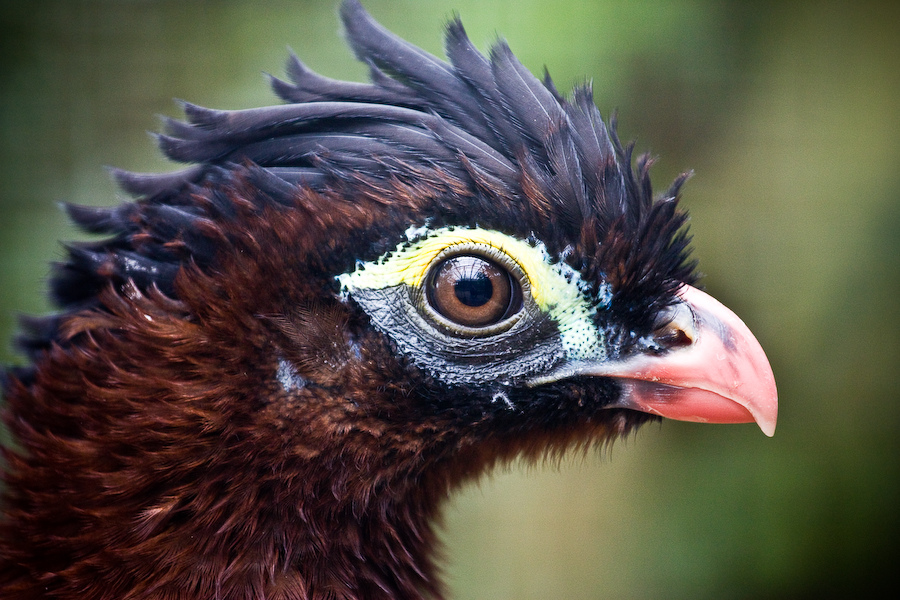

Conservation status
- Least Concern (IUCN 3.1)

Scientific classification
- Kingdom: Animalia
- Phylum: Chordata
- Class: Aves
- Order: Galliformes
- Family: Cracidae
- Genus: Nothocrax; Burmeister, 1856
- Species: N. urumutum

Binomial name
- Nothocrax urumutum (Spix, 1825)

= Nocturnal curassow =

Species of bird

The nocturnal curassow (Nothocrax urumutum) is a species of bird in the family Cracidae, the chachalacas, guans, and curassows. It is found in Brazil, Colombia, Ecuador, Peru, and Venezuela.

== Taxonomy and systematics ==
The nocturnal curassow was originally placed in genus Crax but genetic data confirm that Nothocrax is a valid genus. It is the only member of its genus and has no subspecies.

== Description ==
The nocturnal curassow is the smallest curassow at 50 to 57.5 cm (1.6 to 1.9 ft) long. One bird weighed 1,250 g (2.8 lb). It is also unique with its mostly rufous and chestnut plumage, as other curassows are mostly black. Its crest is flat and blackish, its ventral area buffy, and the tips of its tail feathers are paler than the rest. Its brownish-orange eye is surrounded by bare skin, greenish-yellow above and black below. The bill is reddish-orange and the legs gray.

== Distribution and habitat ==
The nocturnal curassow is found in middle and upper Amazonia, from far southern Venezuela, southeastern Colombia, eastern Ecuador, and northeastern Peru into western and central Brazil. It inhabits terra firme forest and flooded forests (both permanent and seasonal). It favors low lying, gentle, terrain, often near blackwater rivers. It is typically found below 850 m (2,800 ft) but has been recorded as high as about 1,500 m (4,900 ft) in Ecuador.

== Behavior ==
Belying its name, the nocturnal curassow is active in daylight as well as night and twilight, though it sings only at night.

=== Feeding ===
The nocturnal curassow forages singly or in groups of up to four birds, at dawn, dusk, and the few hours after or before them. It feeds on the ground, apparently entirely on vegetable matter though its diet has not been extensively studied.

=== Breeding ===
The nocturnal curassow's breeding season has not been determined, but breeding activity has been noted between October and February. It makes a large loosely woven nest from sticks and palm leaves lined with twigs and dried leaves. Nests have been found high in trees and vines and also on stumps and logs near the ground. The clutch size is two eggs.

=== Vocalization ===
The nocturnal curassow sings only at night, primarily on clear dark nights in dry weather. Its song is "a series of seven, low-pitched, highly resonant notes...rendered 'hmm-hmm-hmmmm, hmm hmm-hmmm, hmmph!'." Sometimes several birds will counter-sing.

== Status ==
The IUCN has assessed the nocturnal curassow as being of Least Concern. Much of its range in western Amazonia remains intact and its mostly nocturnal habits apparently lead to less hunting pressure than other Cracids experience.
