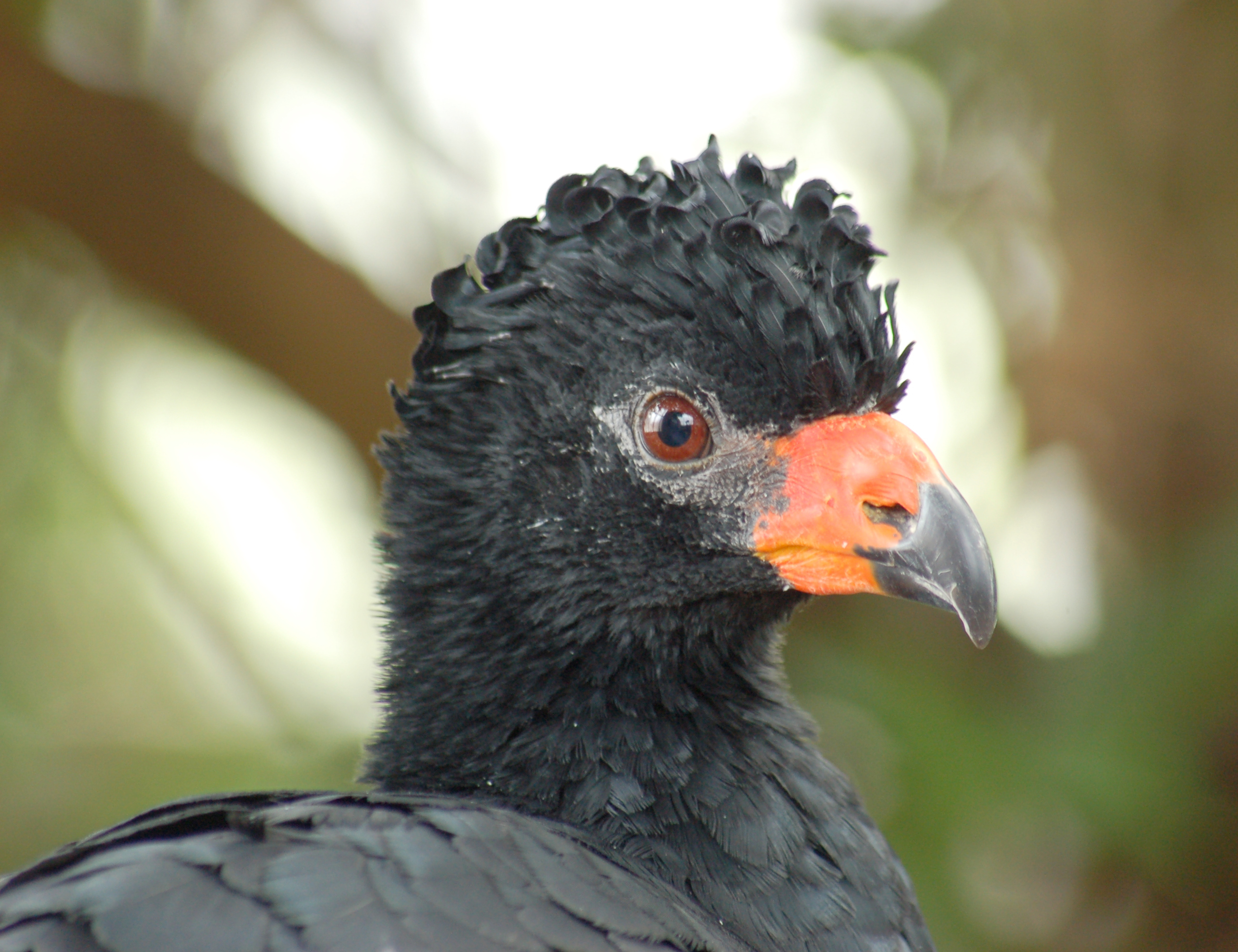
- Head of female wattled curassow Crax globulosa

Scientific classification
- Kingdom: Animalia
- Phylum: Chordata
- Class: Aves
- Order: Galliformes
- Family: Cracidae
- Subfamily: Cracinae; Vigors, 1825

Genera
- Crax; Mitu; Nothocrax; Pauxi

= Curassow =

Curassows

Subfamily of birds

Curassows are one of the three major groups of cracid birds. They are the largest-bodied species of the cracid family. Three of the four genera are restricted to tropical South America; a single species of Crax ranges north to Mexico. They form a distinct clade which is usually classified as the subfamily Cracinae.

Image	Genus	Living species
	Nothocrax	Nocturnal curassow, Nothocrax urumutum
	Mitu	Crestless curassow, Mitu tomentosum; Alagoas curassow, Mitu mitu - extinct in the wild (mid-late 1980s); Salvin's curassow, Mitu salvini; Razor-billed curassow, Mitu tuberosum
	Pauxi – Helmeted curassows	Helmeted curassow, or Northern Helmeted Curassow Pauxi pauxi; Horned curassow or Southern Helmeted Curassow, Pauxi unicornis; Sira curassow, Pauxi koepckeae
	Crax	Great curassow, Crax rubra; Blue-billed curassow, Crax alberti; Yellow-knobbed curassow, Crax daubentoni; Wattled curassow, Crax globulosa; Red-billed curassow Crax blumenbachii; Bare-faced curassow, Crax fasciolata; Black curassow, Crax alector; Belem curassow, Crax pinima

== Evolution ==
In line with the other three main lineages of cracids (chachalacas, true guans, and the horned guan), mt and nDNA sequence data indicates that the curassows diverged from their closest living relatives (probably the guans) at some time during the Oligocene, or c.35–20 mya (Pereira et al. 2002). This data must be considered preliminary until corroborated by material (e.g. fossil) evidence however.

What appears certain from analysis of the molecular data, calibrated against geological events that would have induced speciation, is that there are 2 major lineages of curassows: one containing only Crax, and another made up of Mitu and Pauxi. The position of the peculiar nocturnal curassow is not well resolved; it might be closer to the latter, but in any case, it diverged around the same time as the split between the two major lineages. All curassow genera appear to have diverged, in fact, during the Tortonian (early Late Miocene): the initial split took place some 10–9 mya, and Pauxi diverged from Mitu some 8–7.4 mya (but see genus article).(Pereira & Baker 2004)

Unlike the other cracids, biogeography and phylogeny indicate that the extant lineages of curassows probably originated in the lowlands of the western/northwestern Amazonas basin, most likely in the general area where the borders of Brazil, Peru and Colombia meet. In the two larger genera, vicariant speciation seems to have played a major role.(Pereira et al. 2002, Pereira & Baker 2004)
