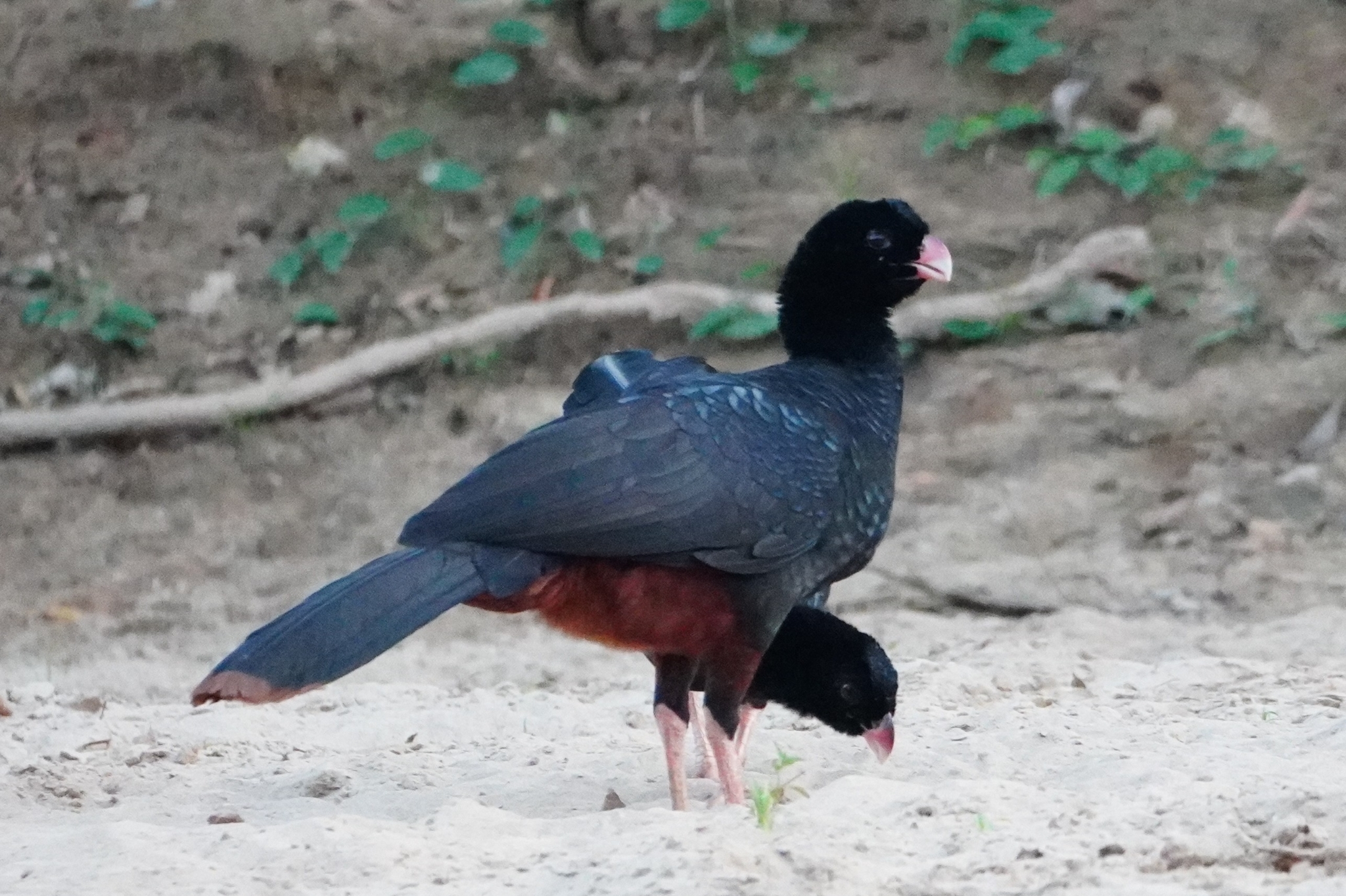

Conservation status
- Least Concern (IUCN 3.1)

Scientific classification
- Kingdom: Animalia
- Phylum: Chordata
- Class: Aves
- Order: Galliformes
- Family: Cracidae
- Genus: Mitu
- Species: M. tomentosum

Binomial name
- Mitu tomentosum (Spix, 1825)

Synonyms
- Crax tomentosa (Spix, 1825); Mitu tomentosa

= Crestless curassow =

Species of bird

The crestless curassow (Mitu tomentosum) is a species of bird in the family Cracidae, the chachalacas, guans, and curassows. It is found in Brazil, Colombia, Guyana, and Venezuela.

== Taxonomy and systematics ==
The crestless curassow was originally described in genus Crax but genetic data confirm that Mitu is a valid genus. The crestless curassow is monotypic.

Phylogenetic analyses based on mitochondrial gene sequences indicate that the crestless curassow is sister to the Alagoas curassow, the other Mitu species with brown eumelanin in the tail tip; together, these two species are the sister group to the rest of the Mitu genus.

== Description ==
The crestless curassow is 75 to 85 cm (2.5 to 2.8 ft) long. Males weigh 2,300 to 3,050 g (5.1 to 6.7 lb) and females 1,300 to 2,425 g (2.9 to 5.3 lb). It is mostly black with a dark blue to purplish gloss. Its belly and the tip of its tail are rich chestnut. Unlike most other curassows, it has no crest and no swelling on its red bill.

== Distribution and habitat ==
The crestless curassow is found in eastern Colombia, southern Venezuela, northwestern Brazil, and southwestern Guyana. It mostly inhabits rainforest along rivers, though it is also found in gallery forest in the llanos of Colombia and Venezuela. It tends to favor areas with thick undergrowth. It is a bird of lowlands; in Colombia it occurs up to 500 m (1,600 ft) and in Venezuela up to 600 m (2,000 ft).

== Behavior ==
=== Feeding ===
The crestless curassow usually forages singly or in pairs but also very rarely in groups of up to 10. It mostly feeds on the ground. Its diet has not been studied but is reported to be almost entirely fallen fruits.

=== Breeding ===
The crestless curassow's breeding season appears to coincide with the rainy season. It places its nest low in trees and lays two eggs.

=== Vocalization ===
The crestless curassow's song is "a low humming or booming 'uuut ... uu-UU-uu-uhoot'", performed year round but more frequently in the breeding season. Its alarm call is a "series of sharp, reedy whistles, 'queet'".

== Status ==
The IUCN originally assessed the crestless curassow as being of Least Concern but in 2012 reclassified it as Near Threatened. Its population is not known but is projected to decrease due to habitat fragmentation and hunting.
