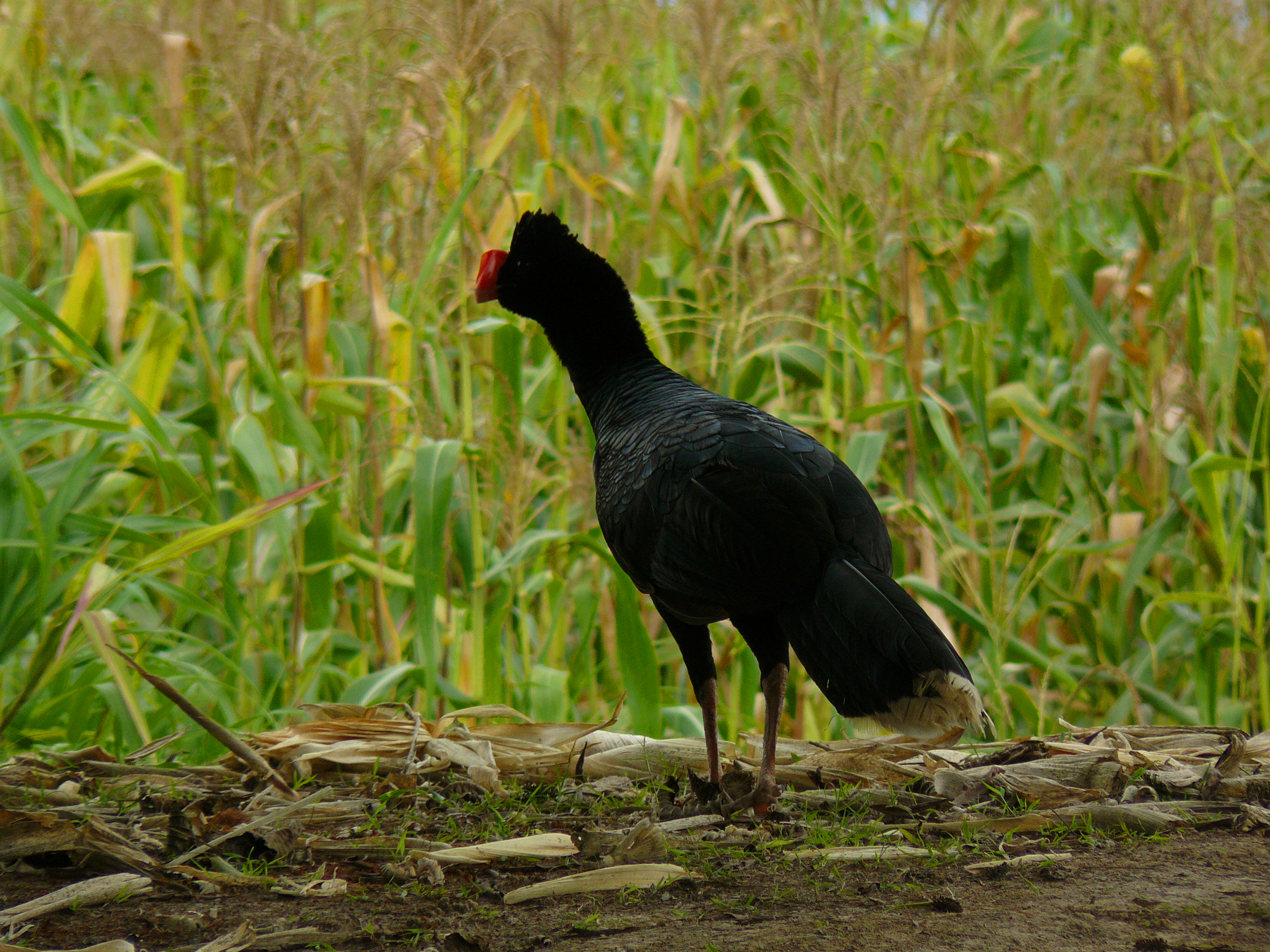

Conservation status
- Near Threatened (IUCN 3.1)

Scientific classification
- Kingdom: Animalia
- Phylum: Chordata
- Class: Aves
- Order: Galliformes
- Family: Cracidae
- Genus: Mitu
- Species: M. tuberosum

Binomial name
- Mitu tuberosum (Spix, 1825)
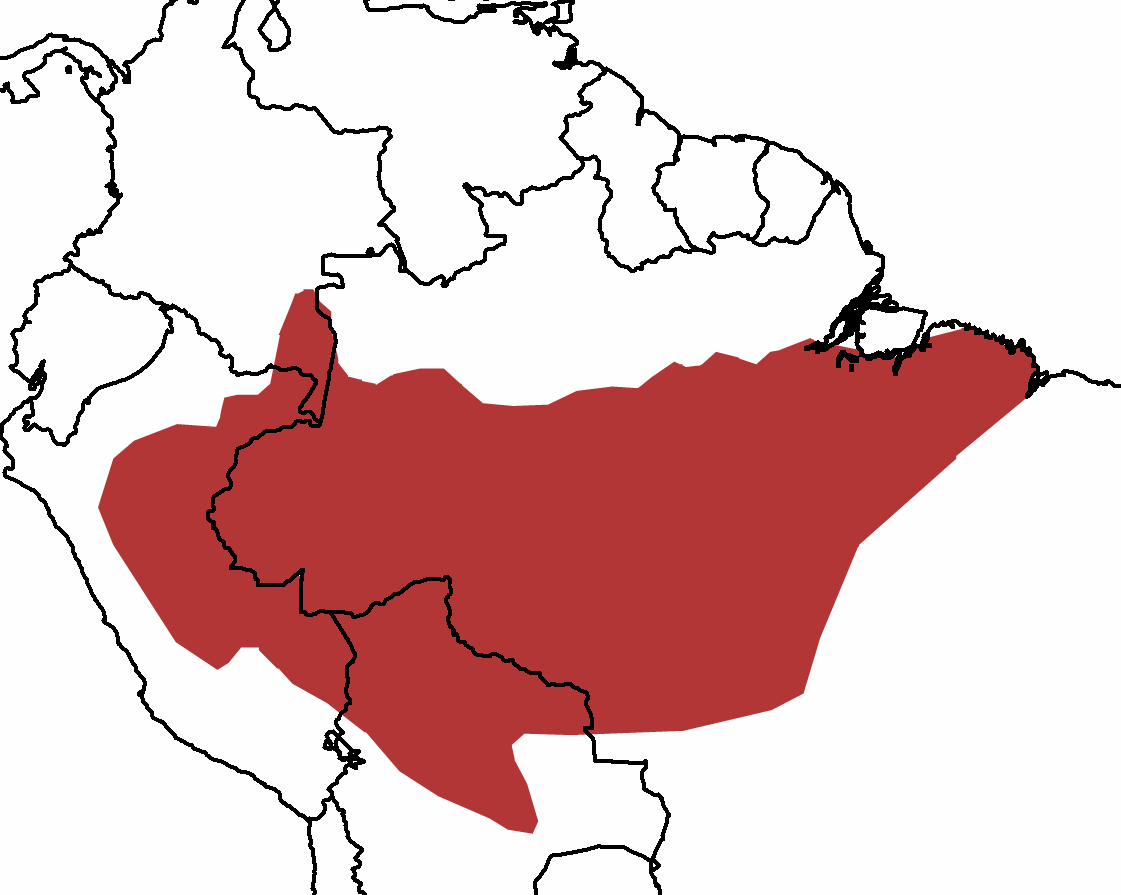
- Distribution of the razor-billed curassow

Synonyms
- Crax tuberosa (Spix, 1825)

= Razor-billed curassow =

Species of bird

The razor-billed curassow (Mitu tuberosum) is a species of bird in the family Cracidae, the chachalacas, guans, and curassows. It is found in Bolivia, Brazil, Colombia, and Peru.

== Taxonomy and systematics ==
The razor-billed curassow was originally placed in genus Crax but genetic data confirm that Mitu is a valid genus. It was for a time treated as a subspecies of Alagoas curassow (Mitu mitu) and they are now treated as sister species. The razor-billed curassow is monotypic.

== Description ==
The razor-billed curassow is 83 to 89 cm (2.7 to 2.9 ft) long and males weigh about 3,860 g (8.5 lb). Their plumage is mostly black with a strong purplish blue gloss. The lower belly and undertail coverts are chestnut and the tips of the tail feathers white. It has a tall ragged crest. Its large bright red bill is laterally compressed, which gives the species its common name.

== Distribution and habitat ==
The razor-billed curassow is found in much of Amazonia, mostly south of the Amazon River in eastern Peru, northern Bolivia, and northern Brazil all the way to the Atlantic coast. It is found north of the Amazon in southeastern Colombia, extreme northeastern Peru, and Brazil as far east as the Rio Negro. It inhabits lowland evergreen forest, primarily terra firme but also gallery and várzea forests and along the margins of lakes and streams. In elevation it ranges from sea level to 1,350 m (4,400 ft) though it may only locally exceed 1,000 m (3,300 ft).

== Behavior ==
=== Feeding ===
The razor-billed curassow typically forages alone or in pairs on the forest floor. Its diet is mostly fallen fruits and also includes leaves, insects, fungi, and small vertebrates.

=== Breeding ===
The razor-billed curassow is occasionally polygynous and might be regularly so. In northern Peru at least, its nesting season spans from November to February. One nest was described as "a perfect round cup" of branches, lianas, and leaves. The clutch size is two or three eggs.

=== Vocalization ===
The razor-billed curassow's song is " "a series of deep booming notes, the first 3 rising, the last 2 even at a slightly higher pitch: BMMM mmMMM... mmMMM'BMMM-BMMM, sometimes followed after pause by sharp BMM!." It is sung from a perch at any time of day but most frequently before and at dawn and during the breeding season. Its calls include "rising whistles and popping notes" and "soft pweet calls".

== Status ==
The IUCN has assessed the razor-billed curassow as being of Near Threatened. It has a very large range. However, its population has not been quantified and is believed to be declining, primarily because of heavy hunting pressure.
