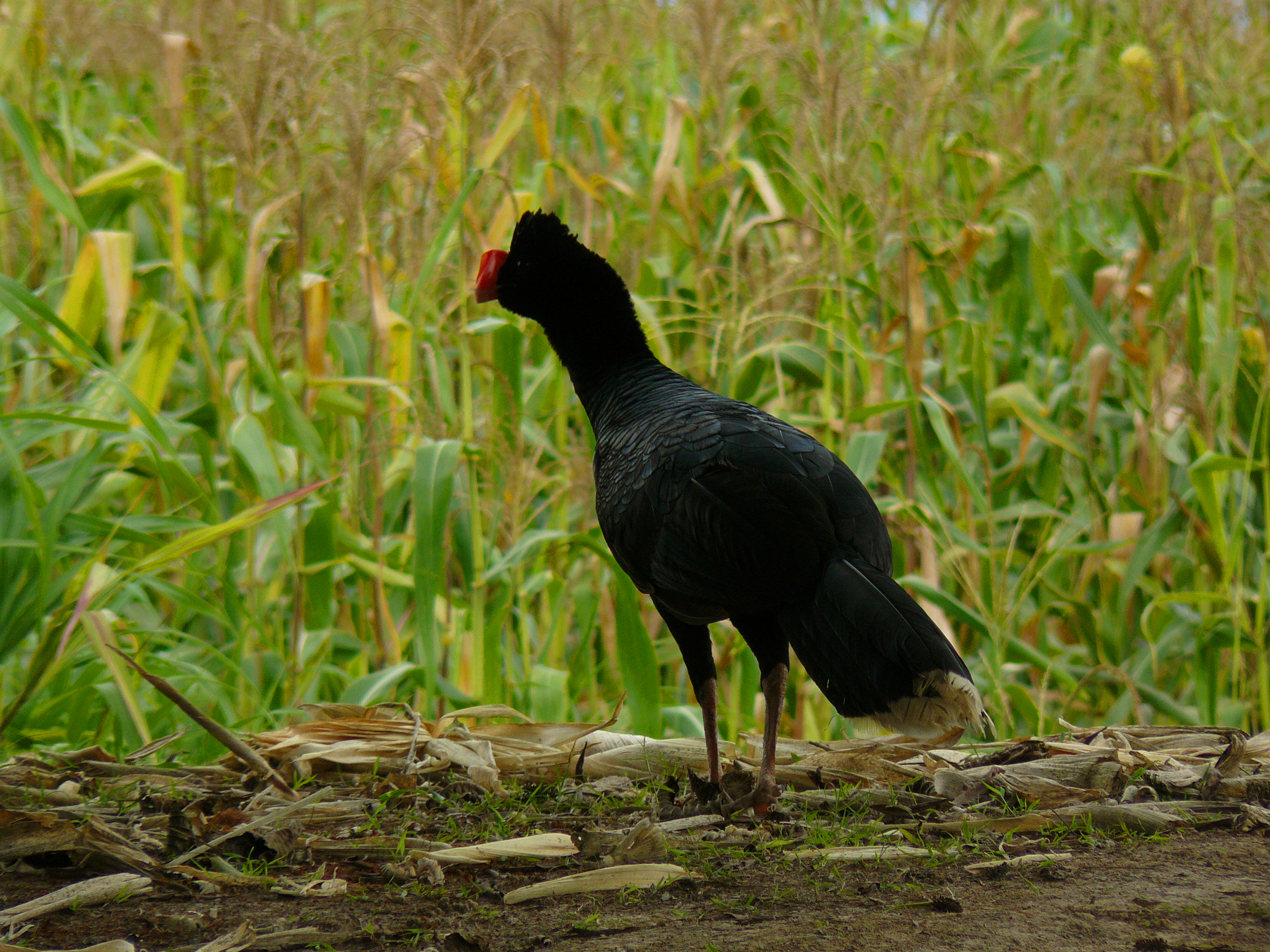
- Mitu tuberosum

Scientific classification
- Kingdom: Animalia
- Phylum: Chordata
- Class: Aves
- Order: Galliformes
- Family: Cracidae
- Subfamily: Cracinae
- Genus: Mitu; Lesson, 1831

Type species
- Ourax mitu Temminck ( = Crax mitu Linnaeus)

Species
- M. tomentosum M. mitu M. salvini M. tuberosum

= Mitu (bird) =

Genus of birds

Mitu is a genus of curassows, large birds in the family Cracidae. They are found in humid tropical forests in South America. Their plumage is iridescent black with a white or rufous crissum (the area around the cloaca) and tail-tip, and their legs and bills are red. The genders are alike.

== Species ==
Image	Scientific name	Common name	Distribution
	Mitu tomentosum	Crestless curassow	Brazil, Colombia, Guyana, and Venezuela.
	Mitu mitu - extinct in the wild (mid-late 1980s)	Alagoas curassow	Northeastern Brazil
	Mitu salvini	Salvin's curassow	Colombia, Ecuador, and Peru.
	Mitu tuberosum	Razor-billed curassow	Amazon Rainforest
