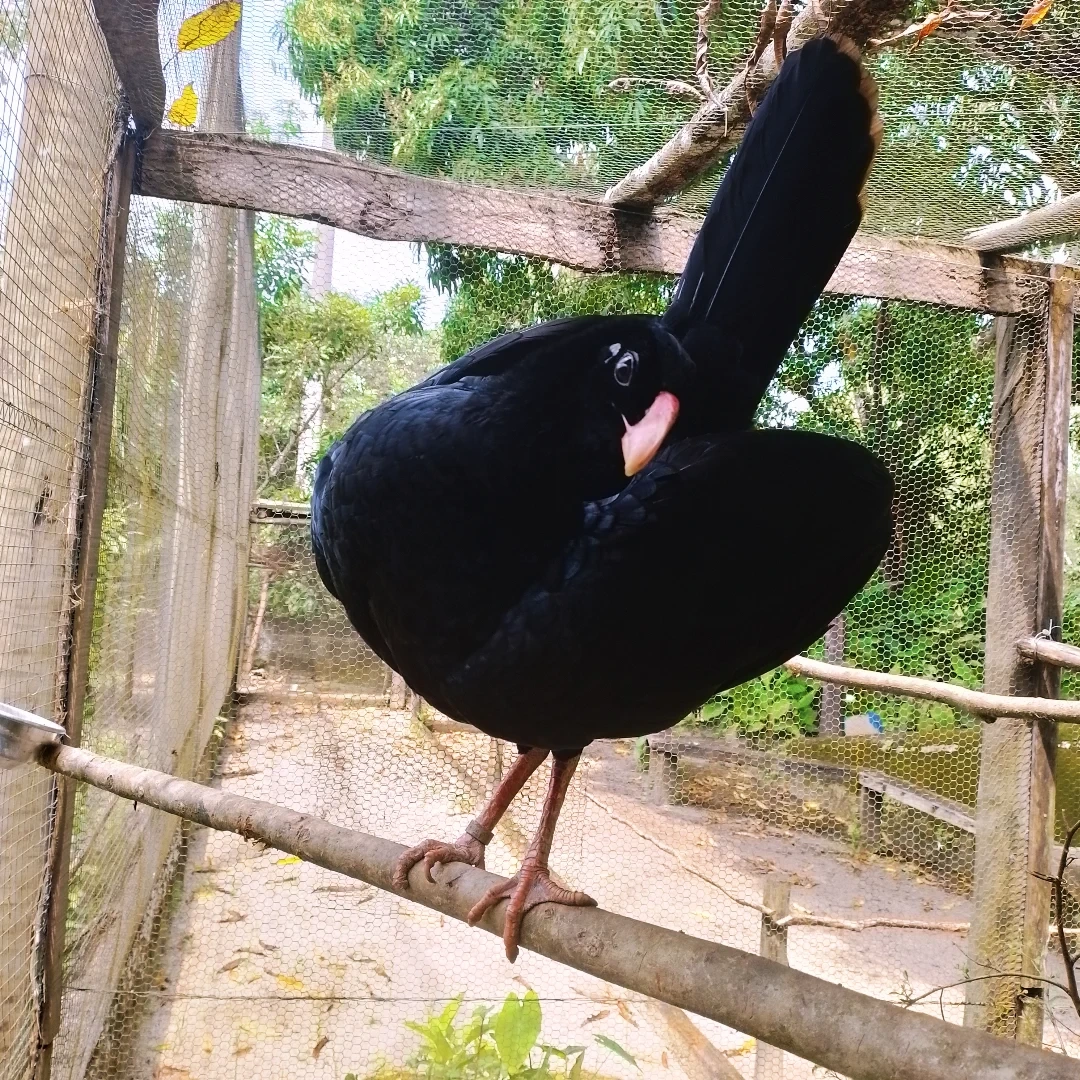
- Alagoas curassow in captivity, 2024

Conservation status
- Extinct in the Wild (IUCN 3.1)
- CITES Appendix I

Scientific classification
- Kingdom: Animalia
- Phylum: Chordata
- Class: Aves
- Order: Galliformes
- Family: Cracidae
- Genus: Mitu
- Species: M. mitu

Binomial name
- Mitu mitu (Linnaeus, 1766)

Synonyms
- Pauxi mitu; Crax mitu Linnaeus, 1766

= Alagoas curassow =

Species of bird native to Brazil

The Alagoas curassow (Mitu mitu) is a glossy-black, pheasant-like bird. It was formerly found in forests in Northeastern Brazil in what is now the states of Pernambuco and Alagoas, which is the origin of its common name. It is now extinct in the wild; there are about 200 individuals in captivity.

German naturalist Georg Marcgrave first identified the Alagoas curassow in 1648 in its native range. Subsequently, the origin and legitimacy of the bird began to be questioned due to the lack of specimens. An adult female curassow was rediscovered in 1951, in the coastal forests of Alagoas. The Pauxi mitu was then accepted as a separate species. At that time fewer than 60 birds were left in the wild, in the forests around São Miguel dos Campos. Several authors in the 1970s brought to light the growing destruction of its habitat and the rarity of the species. Even with these concerns, the last large forest remnants which contained native Alagoas curassow were demolished for sugarcane agriculture.

== Description ==
The Alagoas curassow measures approximately 83–89 centimetres (33–35 in) in length. Feathers covering its body are black and glossy, with a blue-purple hue. Specimens of Pauxi mitu also has a large, bright red beak, flattened at its sides, with a white tip. The same red coloration found on its legs and feet. The tips of its tail feathers are light brown in color, with chestnut colored feathers under the tail. It has a unique grey colored, crescent-shaped patch of bare skin covering its ears, a character not found in other curassows. The distinct coloration separates P. mitu as its own species distinct from other curassow species. Sexual dimorphism is not pronounced: females tend to be lighter in color and slightly smaller in size. In captivity, the birds can live to at least 24 years of age. Video recording in captivity show that this cracid sporadically makes a high-pitched chirping sound.

== Population ==
Since 1977, the entire Mitu mitu population has been in captivity. The population numbered 44 in 2000, and by 2008, there were 130 birds in two aviaries. About 35% of the birds were hybrids with M. tuberosum.

== Habitat and ecology ==
Pauxi mitu native habitat is subtropical/tropical moist lowland primary forest, where it was known to consume fruit of Phyllanthus, Eugenia and "mangabeira." It is extinct and extirpated in its native range in Alagoas and Pernambuco states, Northeastern Brazil.

== Breeding habits ==
Due to their absence in the wild and lack of study previously conducted on these cracids before their extinction in the wild, not much is known about their breeding habits outside of captivity. Alagoas curassow females begin reproducing at about 2 years old. In captivity, they produce about 2–3 eggs each year. There has been a greater genetic variability amongst the Alagoas curassow after 1990, when hybrid breeding programs were introduced; Alagoas curassows were bred with closely related razor-billed curassows.

== Taxonomy ==
The Alagoas curassow was first mentioned by German naturalist Georg Marcgrave in his work Historia Naturalis Brasiliae which was published in 1648. Because of the lack of information and specimens, it was considered conspecific with the common razor-billed curassow, until its rediscovery in 1951 in the Alagoas lowland forests, Brazil.

Phylogenetic analyses based on mitochondrial gene sequences indicate that M. mitu is sister to the crestless curassow, the other Mitu species with brown eumelanin in the tail tip; together, these two species are the sister group to the rest of the Mitu genus. The Alagoas curassow lineage has been distinct since the Miocene-Pliocene boundary (approximately 5 million years ago), when it became isolated in refugia in the Atlantic Forest.

== Conservation efforts ==
As this species is extinct in the wild, the total population of 130 birds only persists in two separate captive populations. A reintroduction plan is being organized, though it faces challenges. Even if the population could be bred to healthy numbers, the species would need to be reintroduced into a large natural geographical area. Human expansion and overpopulation has caused nearly all of the Alagoas curassow's natural habitat to be destroyed. One potential reintroduction site has been proposed. Precautions would have to be taken in order to prevent illegal hunting of the species after reintroduction.

== Status ==
The Alagoas curassow became extinct in the wild due to deforestation and hunting. The last wild Alagoas curassow was seen and killed in 1984, or possibly 1987 or 1988. The captive population has been extensively hybridized with the razor-billed curassow, (Note: Another case of successful interbreeding between quite distant species, as is often found in cracids. See for example Crax species) and there are several dozen purebred birds left. These are being maintained and bred in two privately owned professional aviaries in Brazil mainly due to lack of official interest owing to the long-standing doubt about the taxon's validity.

== Diet and interactions ==
The Alagoas curassow is known to consume a diet of fruits and nuts. Although not much information is known about this species' interactions and behavior in the wild, the stomach contents of these birds were found to contain fruits specifically from the castelo tree. It has also been said that they enjoy fruits from the plant Clarisia racemosa. Generally, the female birds weigh less than the males and lay about 2–3 eggs a year. The average lifespan in captivity is about 24 years.

The lack of knowledge about their behavior in the wild makes it difficult to know how the birds interact with other species. The impact of their introduction on interactions with other species is difficult to predict. For instance, the Chamek spider monkey also eats Clarisia racemosa, which could lead to competition with the Alagoas curassow. A lack of genetic diversity is another potential concern. Scientists have been controlling the sexual interactions within the species by pairing certain birds together in order to reduce hybridization and maintain the original Alagoas curassow.

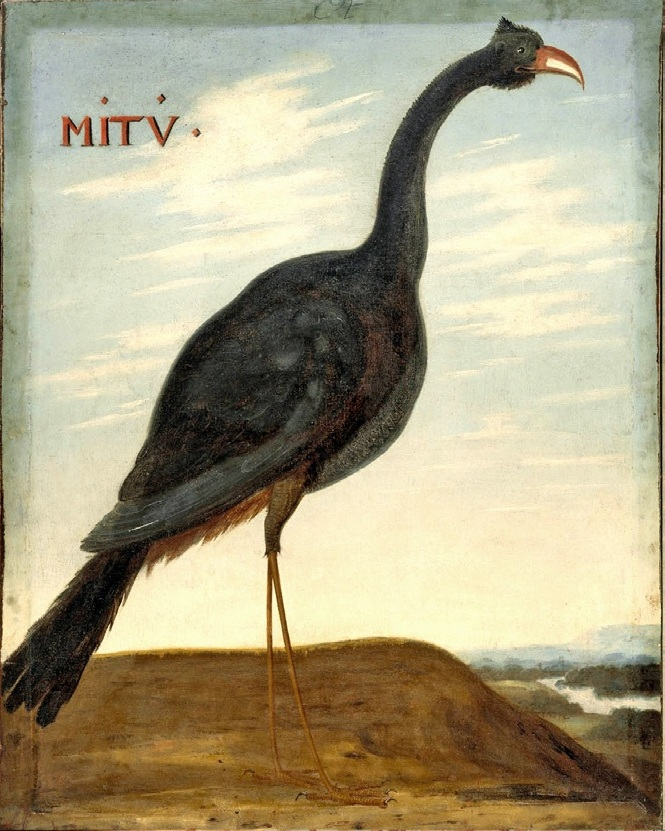
Illustration from the 1650s

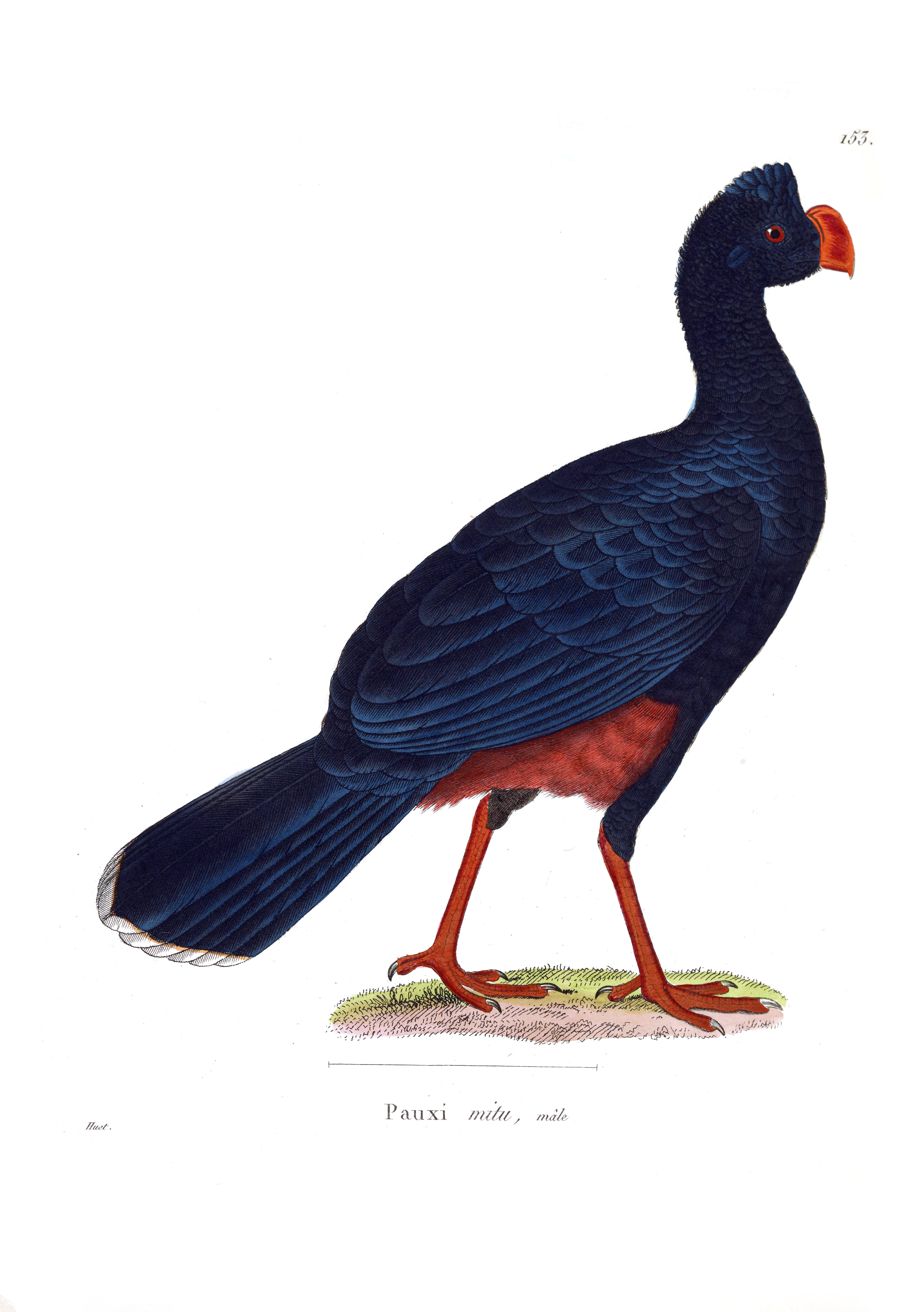
Illustration from Nouveau recueil de planches coloriées d'oiseaux, 1838

== Future of the species ==
With the objective to preserve the species and to increase genetic variability in the population, the "original" stock had their DNA examined by scientists in order to guide future pairings. Once a captive population has been successfully created, they can start being reintroduced back into the wild. The more ideal locations would be large forest remnants, such as those located at Usina Utinga-Leão and Usina Serra Grande.
