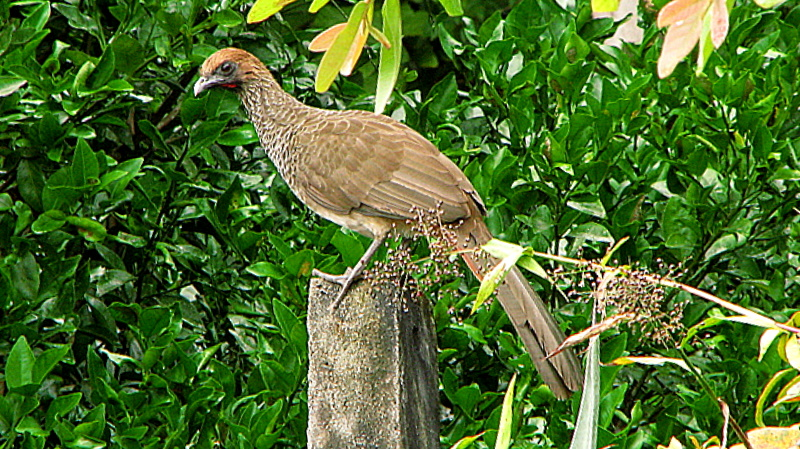

Conservation status
- Least Concern (IUCN 3.1)

Scientific classification
- Kingdom: Animalia
- Phylum: Chordata
- Class: Aves
- Order: Galliformes
- Family: Cracidae
- Genus: Ortalis
- Species: O. araucuan

Binomial name
- Ortalis araucuan (Spix, 1825)

= East Brazilian chachalaca =

Species of bird

The East Brazilian chachalaca (Ortalis araucuan) is a species of bird in the family Cracidae, the chachalacas, guans, and curassows. It is endemic to eastern Brazil.

== Taxonomy and systematics ==
The East Brazilian chachalaca was considered a subspecies of the speckled chachalaca (Ortalis guttata). It has also been treated as conspecific with little chachalaca (O. motmot) and buff-browed chachalaca (O. superciliaris). It is monotypic.

== Description ==
The East Brazilian chachalaca is about 50 cm (1.6 ft) long. It has a dull rufous crown and nape, brown upperparts, and a reddish rump. Its gular patch is red. The lower throat and breast are dark brownish with whitish (female) or buffy (male) spots; the rest of the underparts are white except for the ochre vent. Its dark brown eye is surrounded by bare slate blue skin.

== Distribution and habitat ==
The East Brazilian chachalaca is found in a fairly narrow strip of far eastern Brazil, from Rio Grande do Norte south into Espírito Santo and Minas Gerais. Its primary habitat is the Atlantic Forest but also includes secondary forest, caatinga, and restinga landscapes.

== Behavior ==
=== Feeding ===
The East Brazilian chachalaca forages in flocks of up to about seven birds. Its diet has not been detailed but is known to be primarily fruits.

=== Breeding ===
Very little is known about the East Brazilian chachalaca's breeding phenology. One nest was a shallow bowl made of twigs and leaves, but unlined, and sited in dense foliage about 3.2 m (10 ft) up in a tree. It contained three eggs.

=== Vocalization ===
The East Brazilian chachalaca's song is "a repeated 're-a-tok'" that is easily distinguished from the five-syllable song of the speckled chachalaca.

== Status ==
The IUCN has assessed the East Brazilian chachalaca as being of Least Concern. Though its population has not been quantified, the species is generally considered common and the number stable. It appears to tolerate human activity and human-altered habitat but does face some pressure from habitat destruction and hunting.
