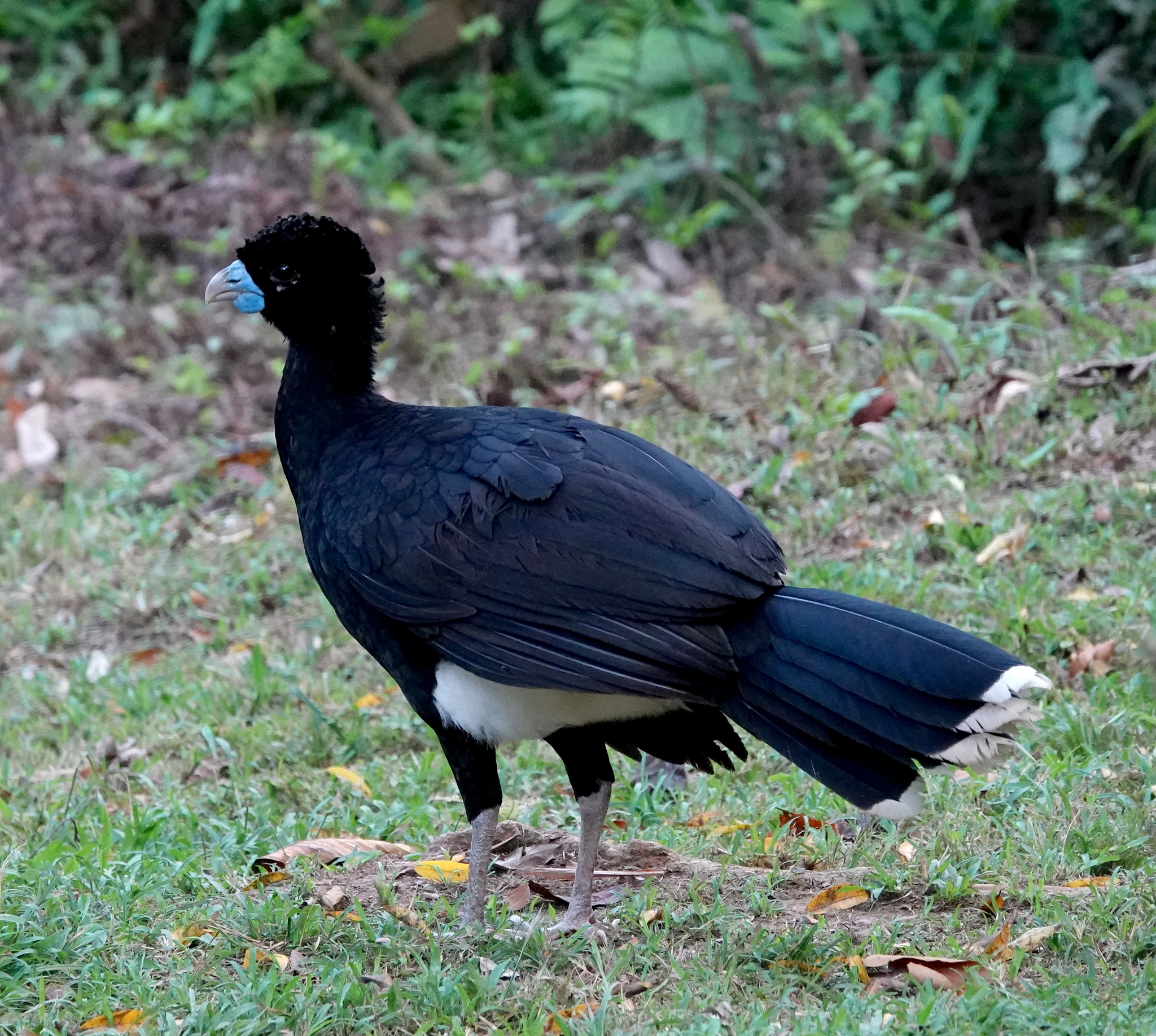
- Male
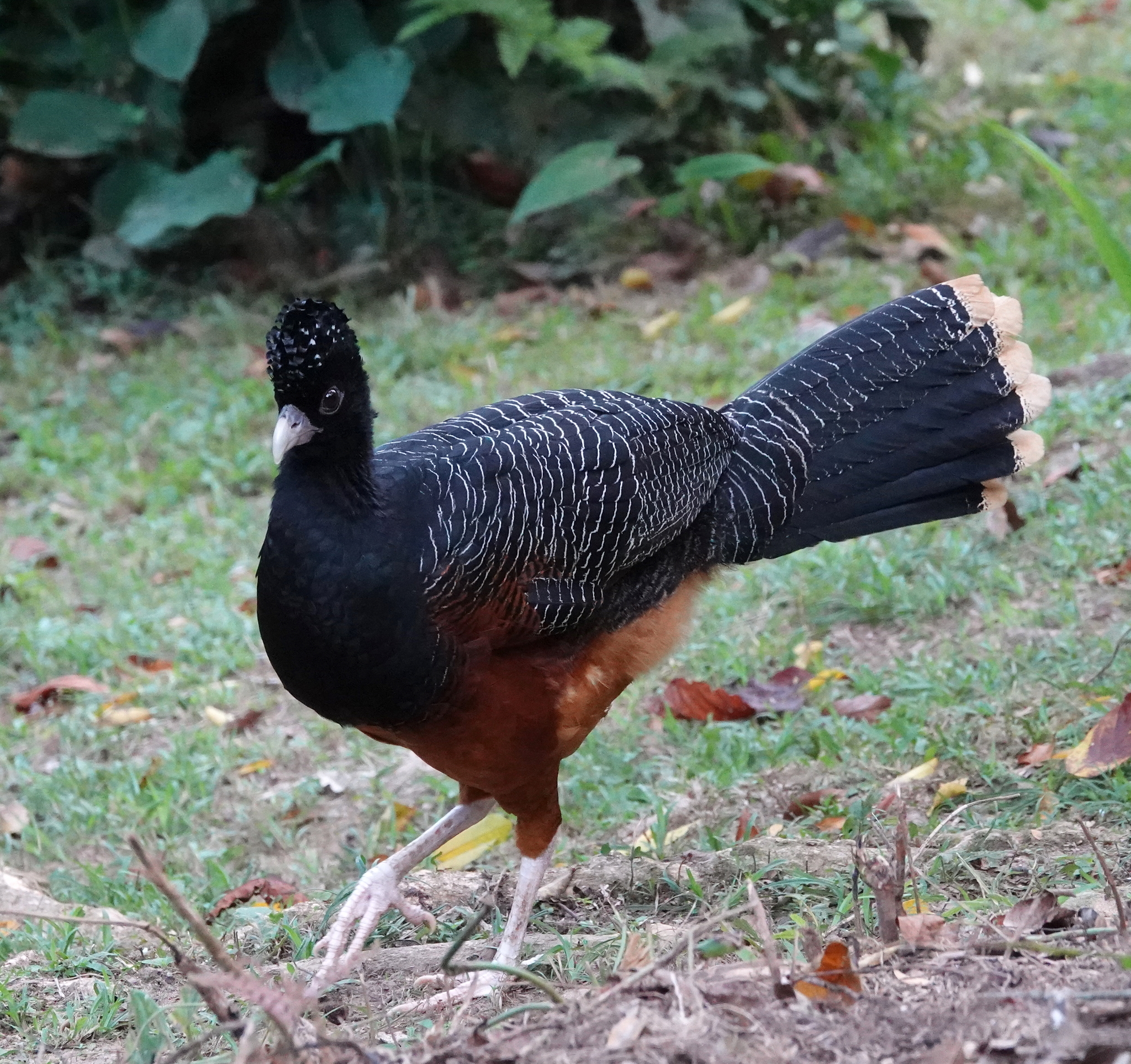
- Female

Conservation status
- Critically Endangered (IUCN 3.1)

Scientific classification
- Kingdom: Animalia
- Phylum: Chordata
- Class: Aves
- Order: Galliformes
- Family: Cracidae
- Genus: Crax
- Species: C. alberti

Binomial name
- Crax alberti Fraser, 1852
- Distribution of the blue-billed curassow

= Blue-billed curassow =

Species of bird

The blue-billed curassow (Crax alberti) is a species of bird in the family Cracidae, the chachalacas, guans, and curassows. It is endemic to Colombia.

== Taxonomy and systematics ==
The blue-billed curassow is monotypic. However, it formerly included what is now the yellow-knobbed curassow (Crax daubentoni) as a subspecies. The holotype of putative species C. annulata has been determined to be a female blue-billed curassow.

== Description ==
The blue-billed curassow is 82.5 to 92.5 cm (2.7 to 3.0 ft) long and weighs 3.2 to 3.6 kg (7.1 to 7.9 lb). It is the only curassow with a blue cere and wattle, the latter found only on the male. Males are mostly black with a white vent and tail tip. Females are also mostly black but their lower belly and vent are rufous. They have fine white barring on the wings and tail, and a rare "barred" morph also has barring on the breast and belly. Both sexes have an erectile crest, the male's black and the female's black and white.

== Distribution and habitat ==
The blue-billed curassow is found only in northern Colombia. Its range used to stretch 106,700-square-kilometers; it now has a highly fragmented range, with small populations between La Guajira and Magdalena Departments south to Antioquia and Boyacá Departments with 2,090-square-kilometers. It inhabits undisturbed forest in the tropical and upper tropical zones, mostly from near sea level to 600 m (2,000 ft) but at least formerly as high as 1,200 m (3,900 ft). The Serranía de las Quinchas area in the Magdalena Valley is home to the last viable population of blue-billed curassows.

== Behavior ==
=== Feeding ===
The blue-billed curassow mainly feeds on the ground. Its diet has not been extensively studied but it is known to include fruits, worms, and insects. It also takes in sand and small stones as digestive aids.

=== Breeding ===
Blue-billed curassows reach sexual maturity at three years of age. The blue-billed curassow's breeding season spans from mid-December to early March. It is reported to be monogamous. It builds a large nest of sticks and dead leaves and conceals it in dense vine tangles. It typically places it between the understory and the subcanopy. The clutch size is two or three eggs. Eggs are incubated for 32 days before hatching full-feathered.

=== Vocalization ===
Male blue-billed curassows "boom" from the ground, "a 4–5-syllable series of deep notes...repeated over and over, 'hmm...hmh...hmm...hmm...hmh'". Both sexes give an alarm call, a "soft, high-pitched whistle 'peh-weeeéoh' or 'pehoo'".

== Status ==
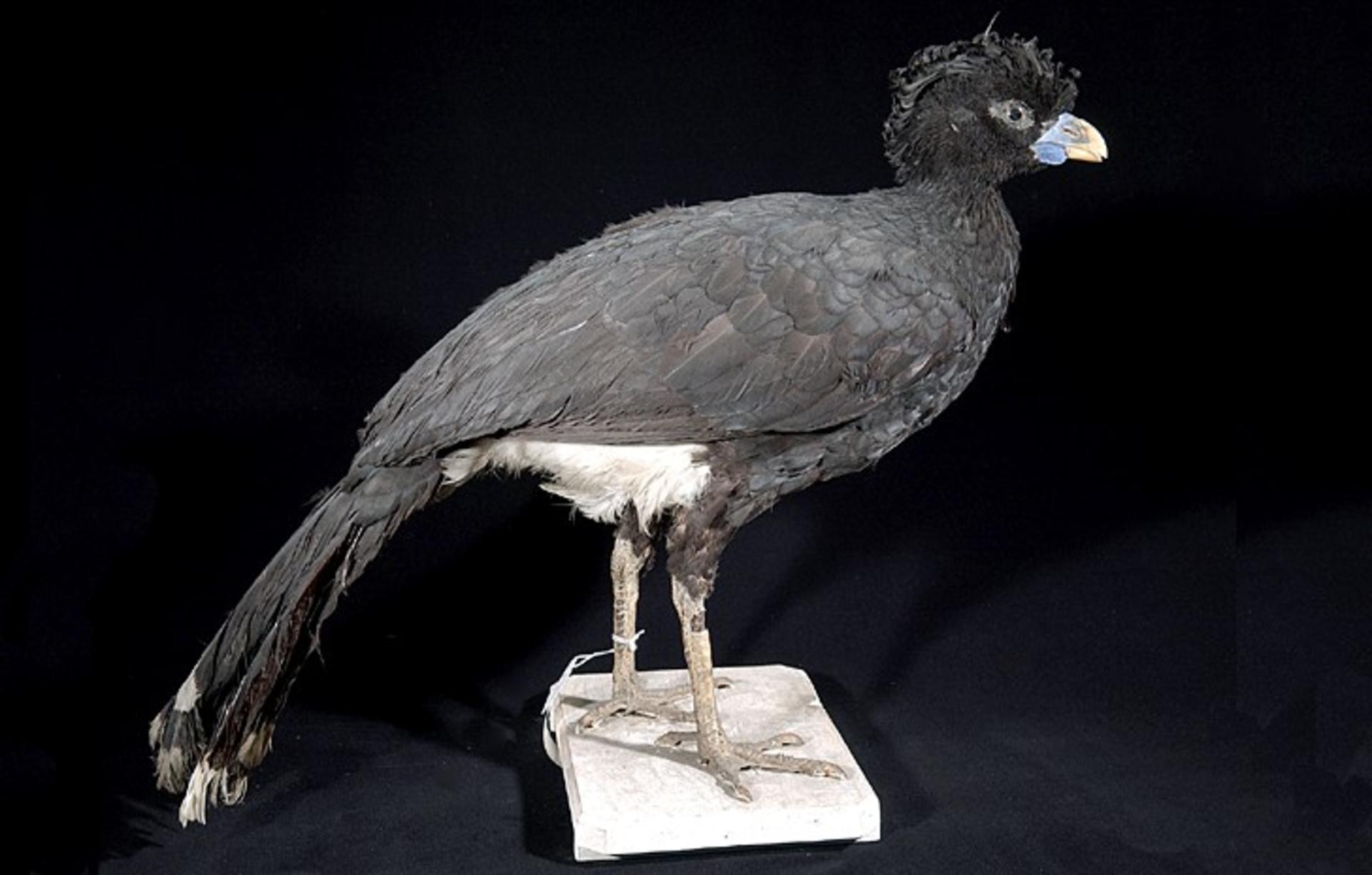
Preserved specimen in the Naturalis Biodiversity Center

The IUCN has assessed the blue-billed curassow as Critically Endangered. Its population is estimated to be between 1,250 – 3,100 mature individuals and its population is fragmented and decreasing. Deforestation and hunting are the major threats. The ProAves El Paujil Bird Reserve in Santander Department was created in 2003 especially to protect one population. Captive breeding has been successful.

=== Threats ===
One of the threats facing blue-billed curassows is habitat loss/fragmentation. Habitat loss occurs from widespread use of herbicides by the Colombian government. Forests have also been cleared for agriculture, livestock, oil extraction, and mining. Around 98% to 99% of blue-billed curassow habitat has been lost.

Hunting is the most immediate threat to the species. Studied populations are not estimated to survive another 100 years as hunting has the greatest impact on the expected extinction date.

=== Conservation efforts ===
In 1991, the International Council for Bird Preservation petitioned the U.S. Fish and Wildlife Service to add the blue-billed curassow to the Endangered Species Act. The species was listed as endangered under the act in 2013.

Blue-billed curassows are currently listed as an Alliance for Zero Extinction species.

Without intervention, populations of blue-billed curassows are not viable for a 100-year period. The most immediate conservation strategies recommended are to eliminate or significantly reduce hunting. Agreements have already been signed with property owners in San Bartolo, La Ganadera, and Rancho Verde ranches to guarantee forest protection and no hunting within their boundaries. This method, combined with captive-bred individuals will help population viability.
