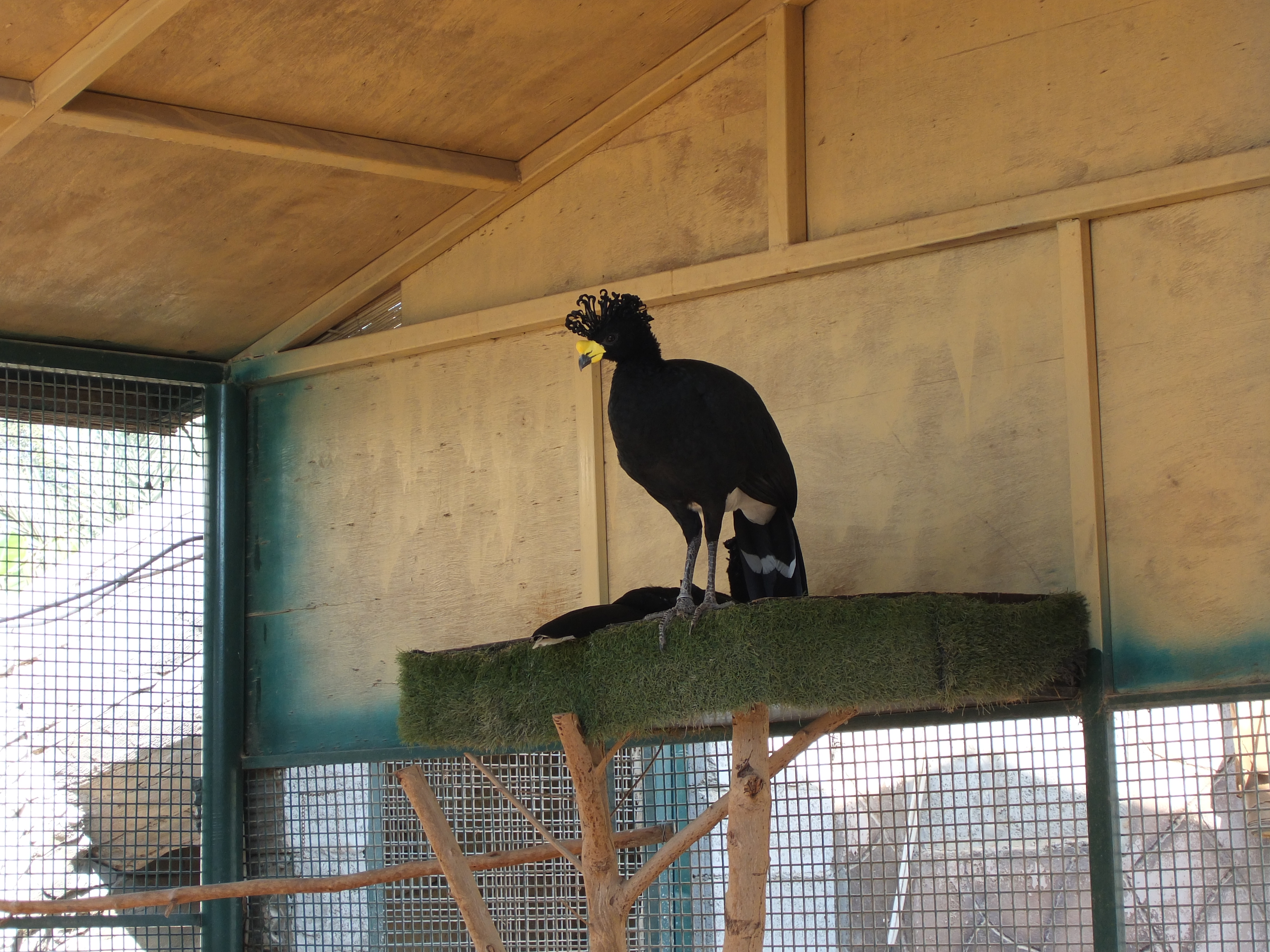
- Male at the Emirates Park Zoo
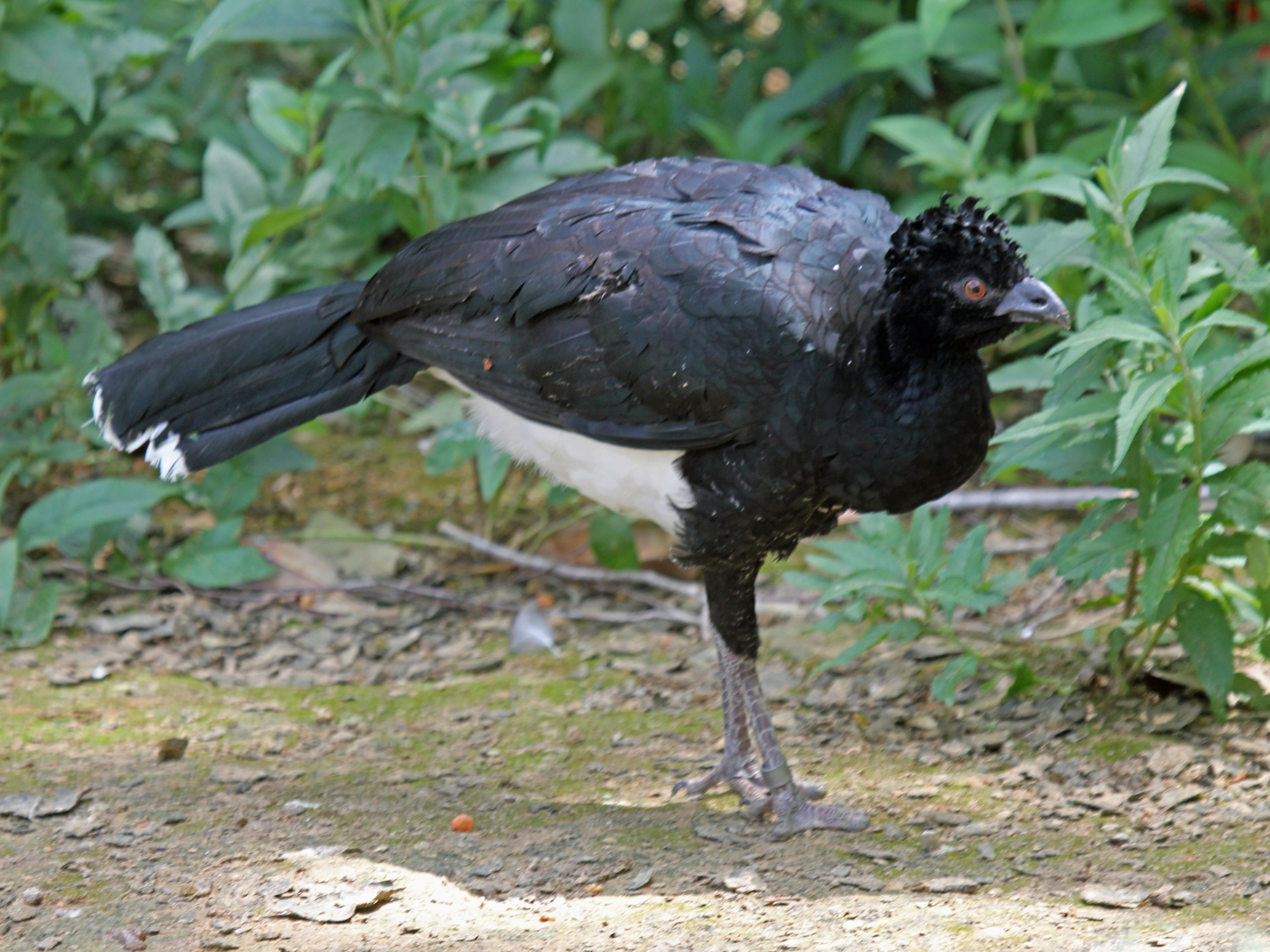
- Female at the Sylvan Heights Bird Park

Conservation status
- Near Threatened (IUCN 3.1)

Scientific classification
- Domain: Eukaryota
- Kingdom: Animalia
- Phylum: Chordata
- Class: Aves
- Order: Galliformes
- Family: Cracidae
- Genus: Crax
- Species: C. daubentoni

Binomial name
- Crax daubentoni G.R. Gray, 1867

= Yellow-knobbed curassow =

Species of bird

The yellow-knobbed curassow (Crax daubentoni) is a species of bird in the family Cracidae, the chachalacas, guans, and curassows. It is found in Colombia and Venezuela.

== Taxonomy and systematics ==
The yellow-knobbed curassow was formerly classified as a subspecies of blue-billed curassow (Crax alberti). It is monotypic. A few subspecies previously proposed for it were determined to be hybrids or aberrant individuals and so were not adopted.

== Description ==
The yellow-knobbed curassow is 84 to 92.5 cm (2.8 to 3.0 ft) long. Males usually weigh between 2,925 and 3,200 g (6.4 and 7.1 lb) but one weighed only 1,625 g (3.6 lb). A female weighed 2,325 g (5.1 lb). The male is the only curassow with a knobbed yellow cere and wattle. Males and females are mostly black with a white lower belly, vent area, and tips of the tail feathers. Females have a black cere and pale barring on the breast and lower belly.

== Distribution and habitat ==
The yellow-knobbed curassow is found in northern Venezuela as far east as Sucre and Monagas states and in immediately adjacent northeastern Colombia. It primarily inhabits gallery forest and tall scrub in the llanos. It also occurs in valleys and ravines in the nearby foothills. In elevation it ranges between 500 and 1,500 m (1,600 and 4,900 ft) in Colombia and 100 and 800 m (330 and 2,600 ft) in Venezuela.

== Behavior ==
=== Feeding ===
The yellow-knobbed curassow forages in small family groups, or in combined ones of up to 15 birds in the dry season. Its primary foods are fruits and seeds with very small amounts of leaves, other plant parts, and insects. It feeds at all levels from the ground to the treetops.

=== Breeding ===
The yellow-knobbed curassow lays eggs during May and June, the early part of the rainy season. It appears to be polygynous. It builds an oval nest of branches and lianas lined with leaves and grass and usually sites it in a tree and concealed by vines. The clutch size is two eggs.

=== Vocalization ===
Male yellow-knobbed curassows sing a "bomb-dropping" descending whistle, sometimes combined with a wing-clapping display or booming. The former is "4–10 rapid cracks of wings above the bird’s back, 'wapp!, wapp!, wapp!-wapp!-wapp!'". The booming is described as "uuumh...uhh".

== Status ==
The IUCN has assessed the yellow-knobbed curassow as Near Threatened. It has a small population that is declining due to habitat loss and hunting.

== Gallery ==
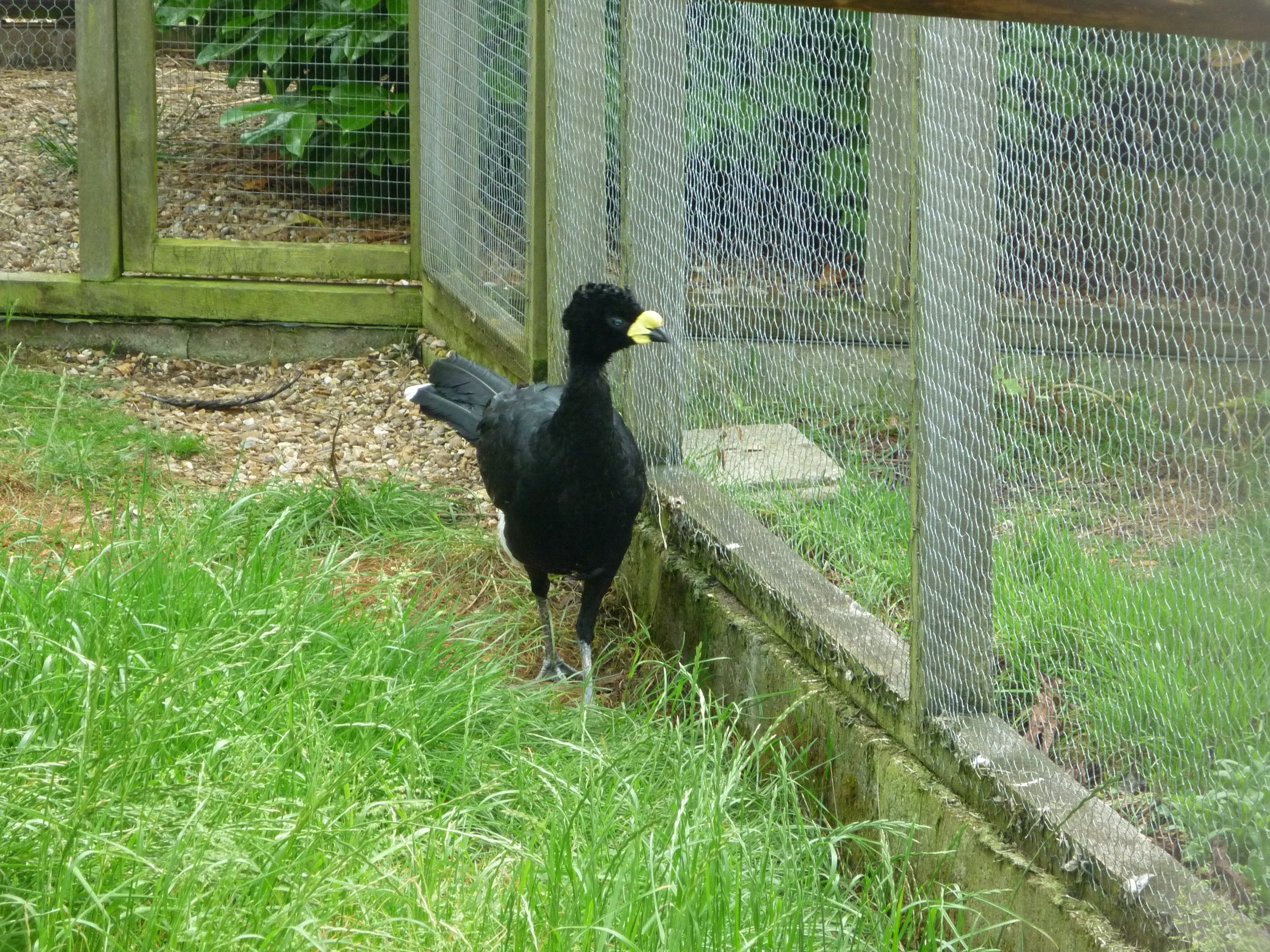
Male at Hamerton Zoo Park, England

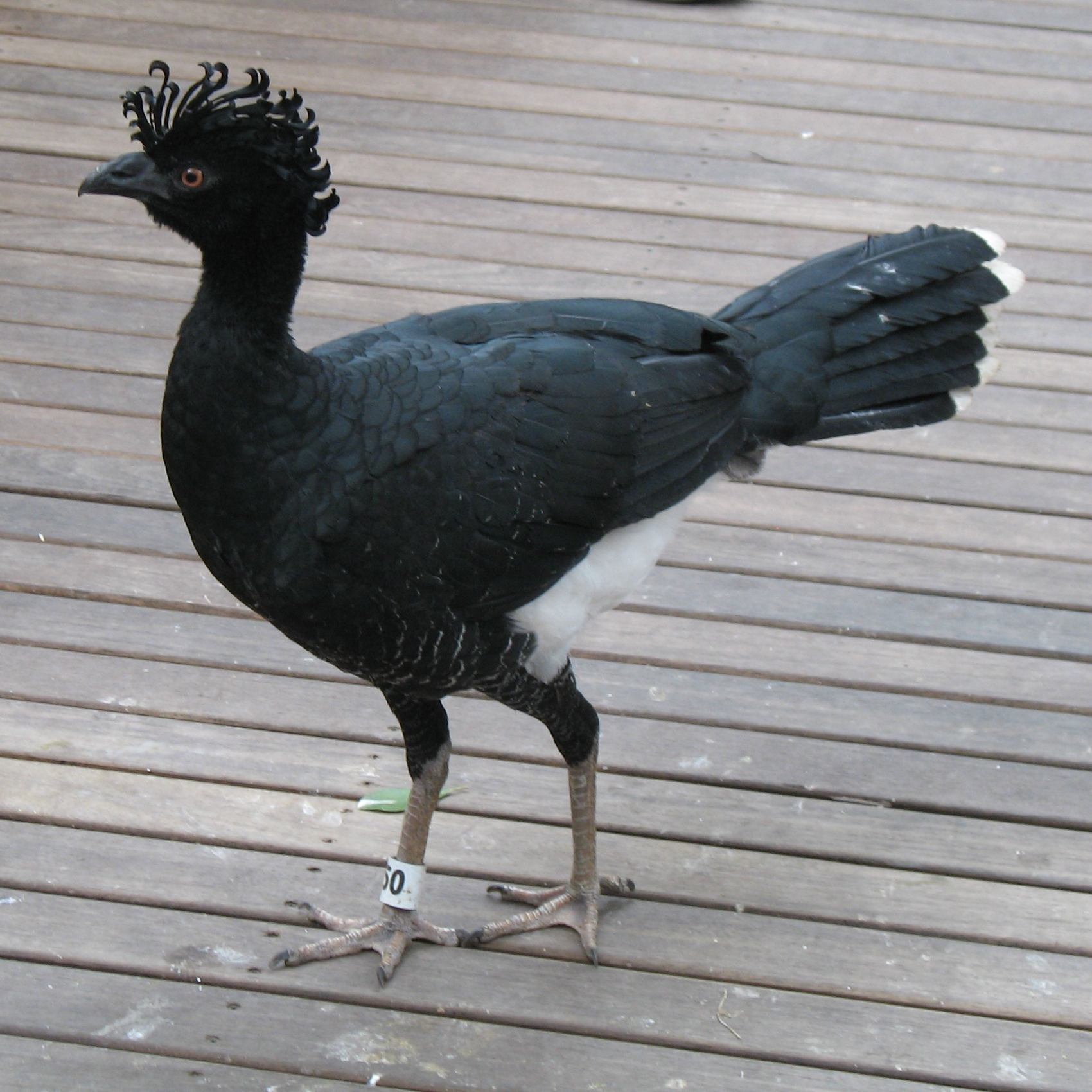
Female at Philadelphia Zoo, USA

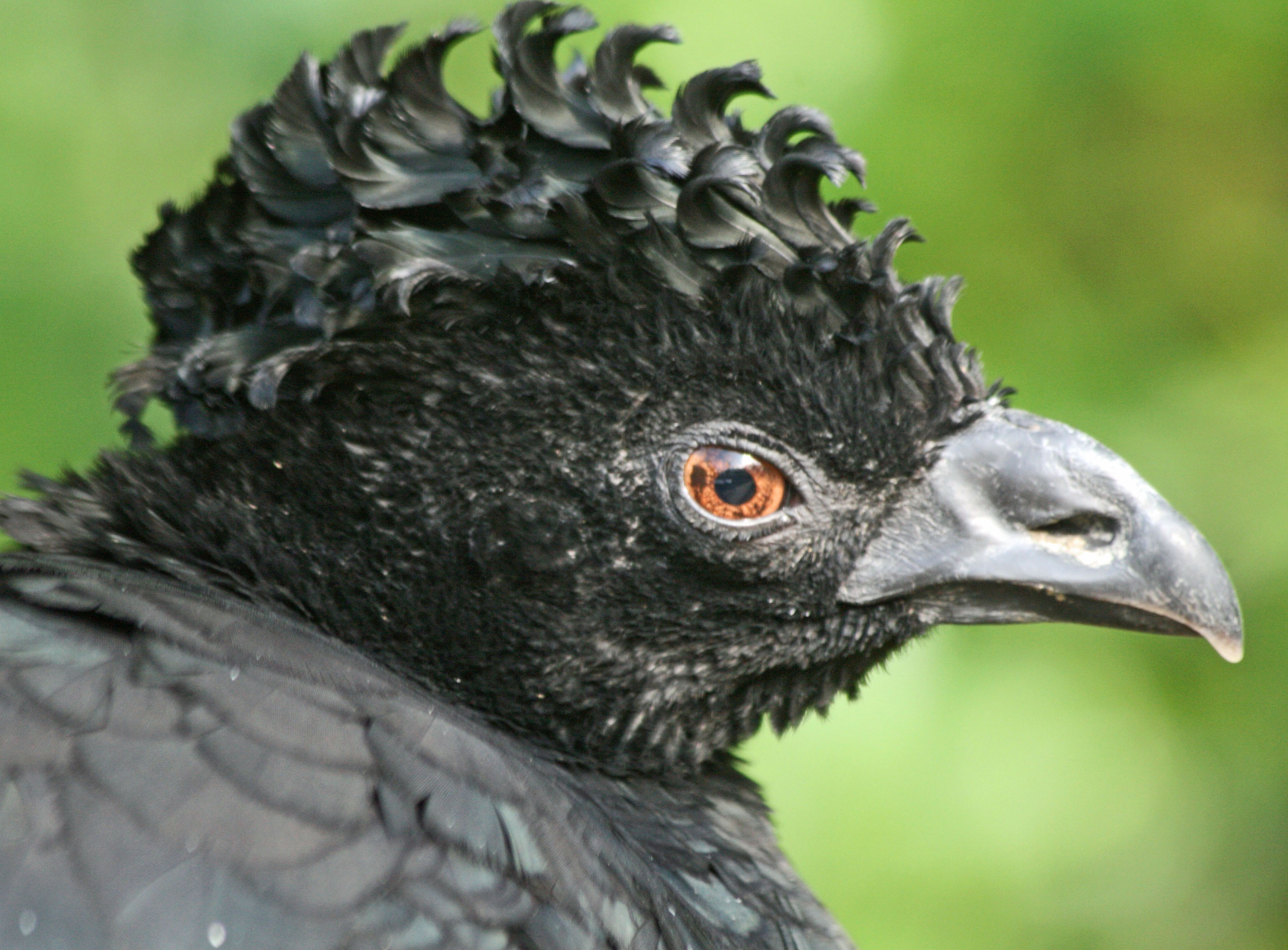
Female

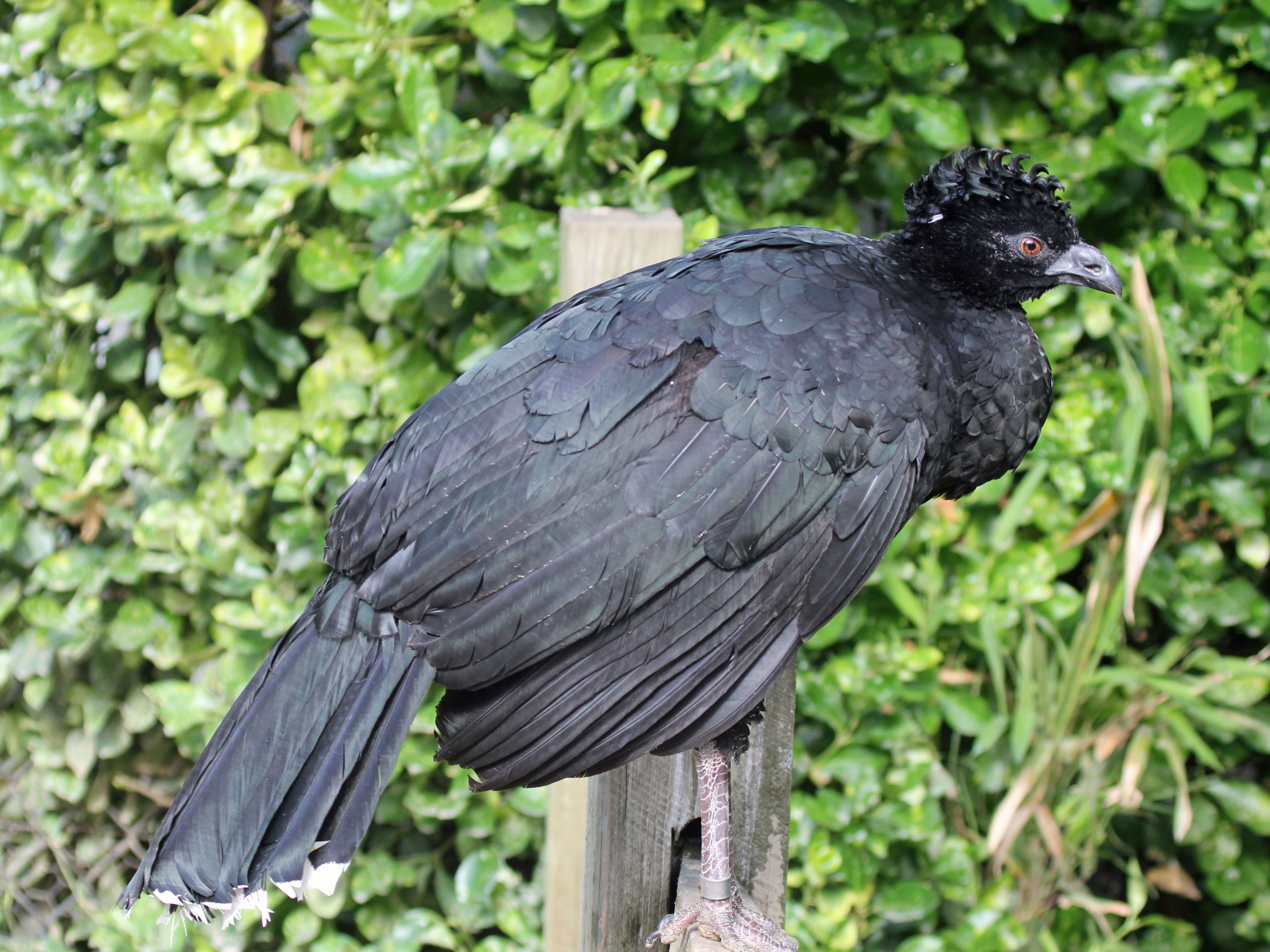
Female

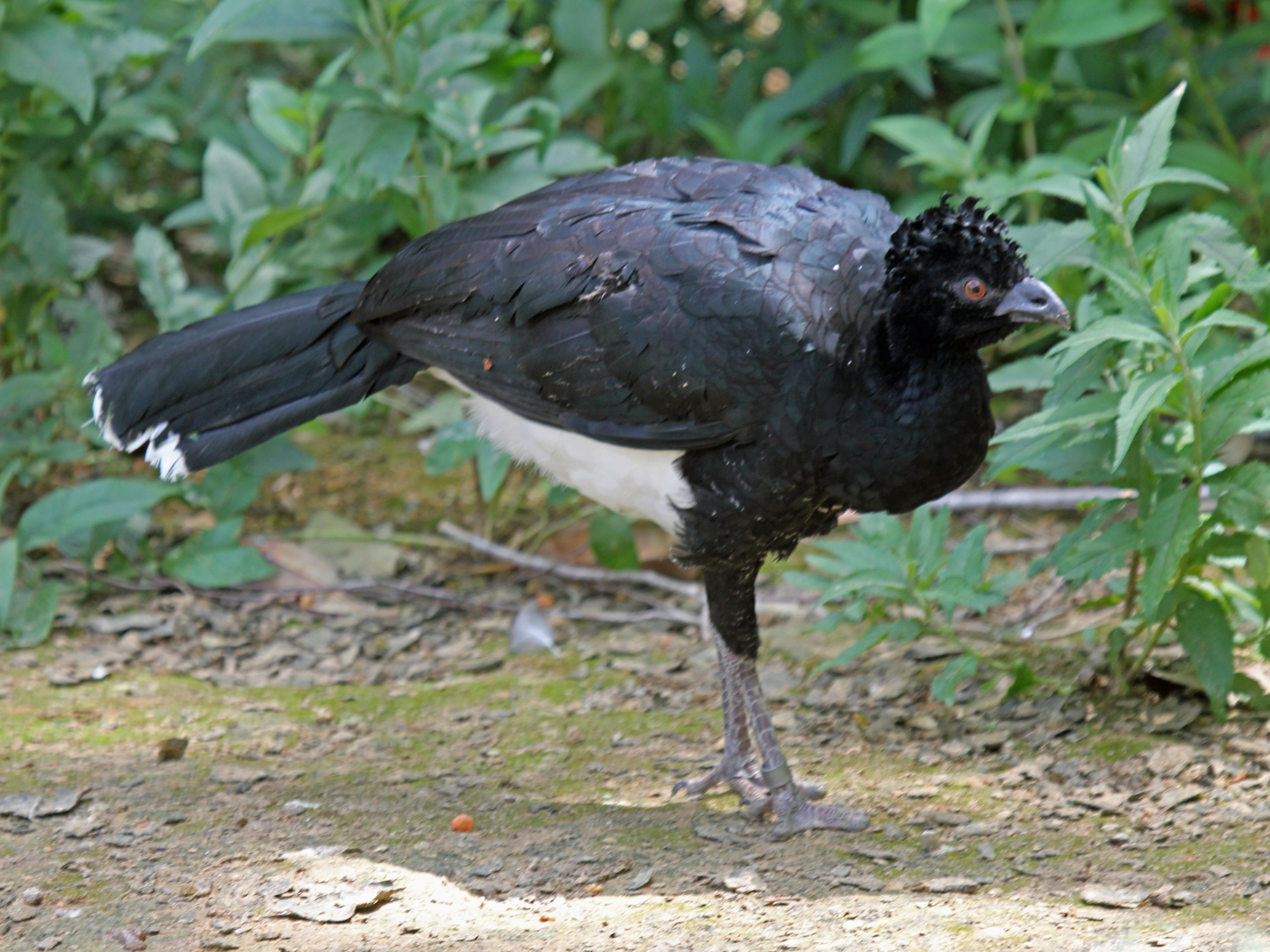
Female
