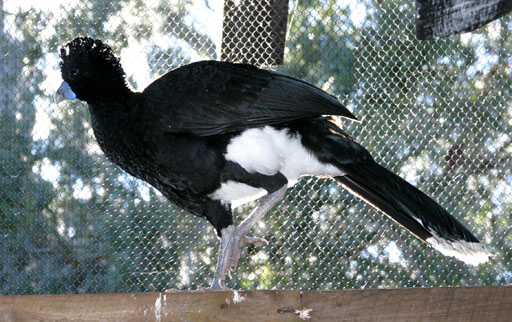
- Blue-billed curassow, Crax alberti

Scientific classification
- Kingdom: Animalia
- Phylum: Chordata
- Class: Aves
- Order: Galliformes
- Family: Cracidae
- Subfamily: Cracinae
- Genus: Crax; Linnaeus, 1758

Type species
- Crax rubra (great curassow) Linnaeus, 1758

Species
- 7, see text.

= Crax =

Genus of birds

Crax is a genus of curassows in the order Galliformes, a clade of large, heavy-bodied, ground-feeding birds. They are known from tropical South America with one species, the great curassow, ranging northwards through Central America as far as Mexico. The curassows in this genus are noted for their sexual dimorphism; males are more boldly coloured than females and have facial ornamentation such as knobs and wattles. They are also characterised by curly crests and contrastingly-coloured crissa (the area around the cloaca). Crax curassows probably originated as a distinct lineage during the Late Miocene. During the Messinian, the ancestral Crax split into two lineages separated by the Colombian Andes and the Cordillera de Mérida which uplifted at that time. The northern lineage radiated into the great, blue-billed, and yellow-knobbed curassows, while the four southern species evolved as they became separated by the uplifting of various mountain ranges.

== Characteristics ==
The variety of male bill ornament shapes and colors is typical for this genus, as is a curly crest and a contrasting white or rufous crissum. Crax species, even distantly related, readily hybridize, with fertile offspring theoretically possible in all possible mating combinations

== Taxonomy ==
The genus Crax was introduced in 1758 by the Swedish naturalist Carl Linnaeus in the tenth edition of his Systema Naturae. The genus name may be based on the Ancient Greek κρας (kras), meaning "head". The type species was designated as the great curassow (Crax rubra) in 1897 by the American ornithologist Robert Ridgway.

=== Species ===
The genus contains 7 species:

Genus Crax – Linnaeus, 1758 – seven species
Common name	Scientific name and subspecies	Range	Size and ecology	IUCN status and estimated population
Great curassow Male Female	Crax rubra Linnaeus, 1758 Two subspecies: C. r. rubra Linnaeus, 1758; C. r. griscomi Nelson, 1926	eastern Mexico, through Central America to western Colombia and northwestern Ecuador	Size: Habitat: Diet:	VU
Blue-billed curassow Male Female	Crax alberti Fraser, 1852	Colombia	Size: Habitat: Diet:	CR
Yellow-knobbed curassow Male Female	Crax daubentoni G.R. Gray, 1867	Colombia and Venezuela	Size: Habitat: Diet:	NT
Wattled curassow Male Female	Crax globulosa Spix, 1825	western Amazon basin in South America	Size: Habitat: Diet:	EN
Red-billed curassow Male Female	Crax blumenbachii Spix, 1825	Espírito Santo, Bahia and Minas Gerais in southeastern Brazil	Size: Habitat: Diet:	EN
Bare-faced curassow Male Female	Crax fasciolata Spix, 1825 Three subspecies: C. f. fasciolata (Spix, 1825); C. f. grayi (Ogilvie-Grant, 1893); C. f. pinima (Pelzeln, 1870)	eastern-central and southern Brazil, Paraguay, and eastern Bolivia, and extreme northeast Argentina	Size: Habitat: Diet:	VU
Black curassow	Crax alector Linnaeus, 1766 Two subspecies: C. a. alector (Linnaeus, 1766); C. a. erythrognatha (PL Sclater and Salvin, 1877)	northern South America in Colombia, Venezuela, the Guianas and far northern Brazil. Introduced to Bahamas, Cuba, Jamaica, Haiti, Dominican Republic, Puerto Rico and Lesser Antilles	Size: Habitat: Diet:	LC

This genus forms one of the two major lineages of curassows. It is distinguishable from its relatives by its pronounced sexual dimorphism (with the exception of the black curassow). In other genera sexual dimorphism is rarely exhibited or of minor appearance (Nothocrax and Pauxi), or manifest by size only (Mitu).

== Evolution ==
Crax curassows probably originated as a distinct lineage during the Tortonian (Late Miocene), some 10-9 mya, in the western or northwestern Amazonas basin, as indicated by mt and nDNA sequence data calibrated against geological events (Pereira & Baker 2004, Pereira et al. 2002). Some 6 mya during the Messinian, the ancestral Crax split into two lineages which are separated by the Colombian Andes and the Cordillera de Mérida which were uplifted around that time, and the Orinoco which consequently assumed its present-day basin.

The northern lineage quite soon thereafter radiated into the ancestors of the great, blue-billed, and yellow-knobbed curassows, which were isolated from each other by the uplift of the northern Cordillera Occidental, and the Serranía del Perijá, respectively; it is fairly certain that these lineages were well distinct by the end of the Miocene. (Pereira & Baker 2004)

The evolution of the 4 southern species was somewhat more complex. In the Messinian, about 6–5.5 mya, the ancestors of the wattled curassow became isolated in the western Amazonas basin. With increasing aridification of southeastern Brazil, the ancestors of the red-billed curassow found refuge in the mountain ranges between the Brazilian Highlands and the Atlantic during the mid-Zanclean, some 4.5-4 mya. The divergence between the bare-faced and black curassow lineages apparently took place around the Uquian–Ensenadan boundary, some 1.5 mya. This which coincides with one or several period(s) of elevated sea levels during which the lower Amazonas basin was a brackish lagoon which offered little curassow habitat. Their present ranges are consequently still separated by the Amazonas river. (Pereira & Baker 2004)

== Sources ==
- Pereira, Sérgio Luiz; Baker, Allan J (2004). "Vicariant speciation of curassows (Aves, Cracidae): a hypothesis based on mitochondrial DNA phylogeny". Auk. 121 (3): 682–694. doi:10.1642/0004-8038(2004)121[0682:VSOCAC]2.0.CO;2. HTML fulltext without images
- Pereira, Sérgio Luiz; Baker, Allan J.; Wajntal, Anita (2002). "Combined nuclear and mitochondrial DNA sequences resolve generic relationships within the Cracidae (Galliformes, Aves)" (PDF). Systematic Biology. 51 (6): 946–958. doi:10.1080/10635150290102519. PMID 12554460. Archived from the original on 2008-09-10.
