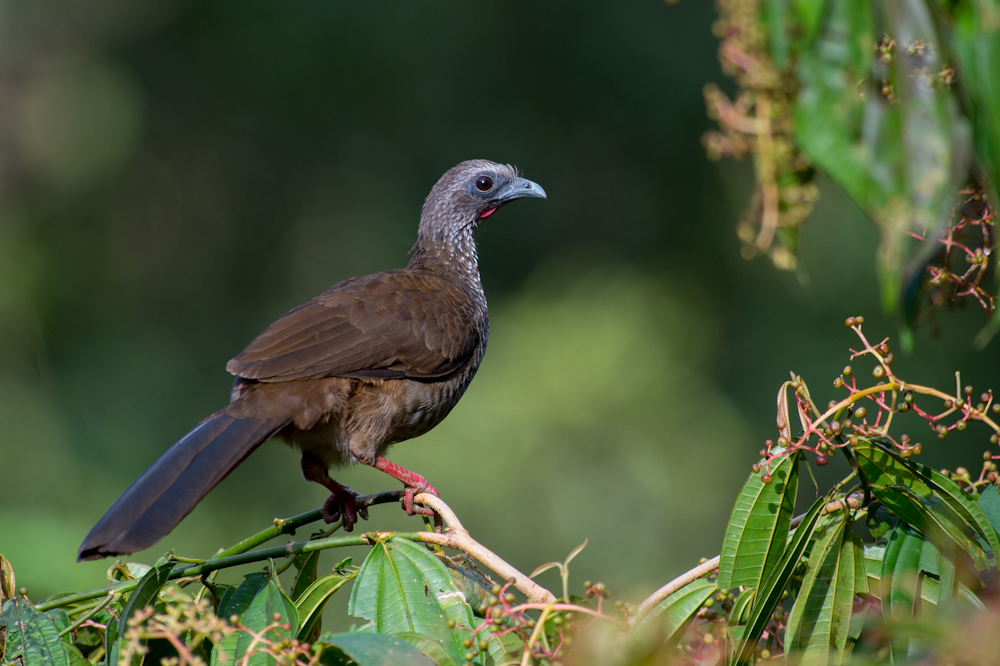

Conservation status
- Least Concern (IUCN 3.1)

Scientific classification
- Kingdom: Animalia
- Phylum: Chordata
- Class: Aves
- Order: Galliformes
- Family: Cracidae
- Genus: Ortalis
- Species: O. guttata

Binomial name
- Ortalis guttata (Spix, 1825)

= Speckled chachalaca =

Species of bird

The speckled chachalaca (Ortalis guttata) is a medium-sized bird belonging to the family Cracidae (chachalacas, guans, and curassows).

This species is found across the Amazonian regions of Bolivia, Brazil, Colombia, Ecuador, and Peru. The two Amazonian subspecies are generally common and inhabit low or open forest, thickets, and riparian areas. A third, isolated subspecies is found in a small area of southeastern Brazil.

== Taxonomy and systematics ==
The taxonomic history of the speckled chachalaca is complex. It was at one time considered conspecific with what was then called the variable chachalaca (Ortalis motmot) and buff-browed chachalaca (O. superciliaris). They were split and the variable chachalaca has since been split further. (Confusingly, the International Ornithological Committee (IOC) then renamed O. motmot little chachalaca but the American Ornithological Society (AOS) and the Clements taxonomy retained the name "variable" for it.) Later still, three more species were split from speckled chachalaca, the East Brazilian (O. araucuan), scaled (O. squamata), and Colombian (O. columbiana) chachalacas.

The speckled chachalaca as now understood has three subspecies, the nominate O. g. guttata, O. g. subaffinis, and O. g. remota. However, some authors treat the last as a subspecies of scaled chachalaca and others suggest it deserves to be an entirely separate species.

== Description ==
The speckled chachalaca is 49 to 55 cm (1.6 to 1.8 ft) long. The nominate subspecies is mostly brown above with a darker and grayer head and neck. The mantle has a chestnut wash; the tail has a bronze gloss and the outer feathers are rufous. The throat and breast are dark brown with the eponymous white speckles. The lower breast and belly are light grayish brown and the vent bright rufous. The eye is dark brown to dark reddish brown and is surrounded by bare slate blue skin.

O. g. subaffinis is lighter but browner overall than the nominate, does not have the chestnut wash on the mantle, and the marks on the throat and breast are more scalloped than speckled. It is also somewhat larger. O. g. remota's description is from a single specimen. It differs from the nominate: Its crown is rufescent rather than gray, it is paler and more olive above, the rump is chestnut, and the "speckles" are larger and less well defined.

== Distribution and habitat ==
The nominate subspecies of speckled chachalaca is found in the Amazonia of eastern Colombia, Ecuador, and Peru; northern Bolivia; and western Brazil. O. g. subaffinis is found in the Amazonia of eastern and northeastern Bolivia and adjoining southwestern Brazil. O. g. remota is, as its specific epithet implies, remote from the other two subspecies; it is found in southeastern Brazil's Mato Grosso do Sul and São Paulo states.

The speckled chachalaca inhabits a variety of tropical and subtropical landscapes. The two Amazonian subspecies is typically found in low or open forest, thickets, "forest islands" in savanna, várzea, and riparian and floodplain forest. They shun the interior of terra firme forest. They reach their highest elevations at the western edge of their range, usually up to 2,000 m (6,600 ft) in Bolivia, 1,100 m (3,600 ft) in Ecuador, and 1,700 m (5,600 ft) in Peru though locally higher in all three countries. O. g. remota is found only in secondary woodland and the edges of gallery forest in its small zone.

== Behavior ==
=== Feeding ===
The speckled chachalaca mostly forages in small flocks of up to seven birds, primarily in the subcanopy and understory and only rarely on the ground. Its diet has not been extensively studied but is known to include fruits and other plant material.

=== Breeding ===
The speckled chachalaca's breeding phenology is poorly known. Its nesting season appears to vary across its range but in Peru encompasses at least November to March. One nest was made entirely of leaves on a bed of dry ferns. The clutch size is three to four eggs.

=== Vocalization ===
The song of the nominate speckled chachalaca is a "rhythmic five-syllable phrase rendered ha-ga-GAA-gogok, repeated rapidly." Those of the other subspecies are similar.

== Status ==
The IUCN has assessed the speckled chachalaca as being of Least Concern. The two Amazonian subspecies are generally common throughout their range and occur in protected areas in every country. They seem to tolerate human activity fairly well, and hunting pressure is less than that suffered by other chachalacas. O. g. remota, however, is very rare; much of its habitat was flooded by hydroelectric reservoirs and Brazilian authorities consider it Critically Endangered.
