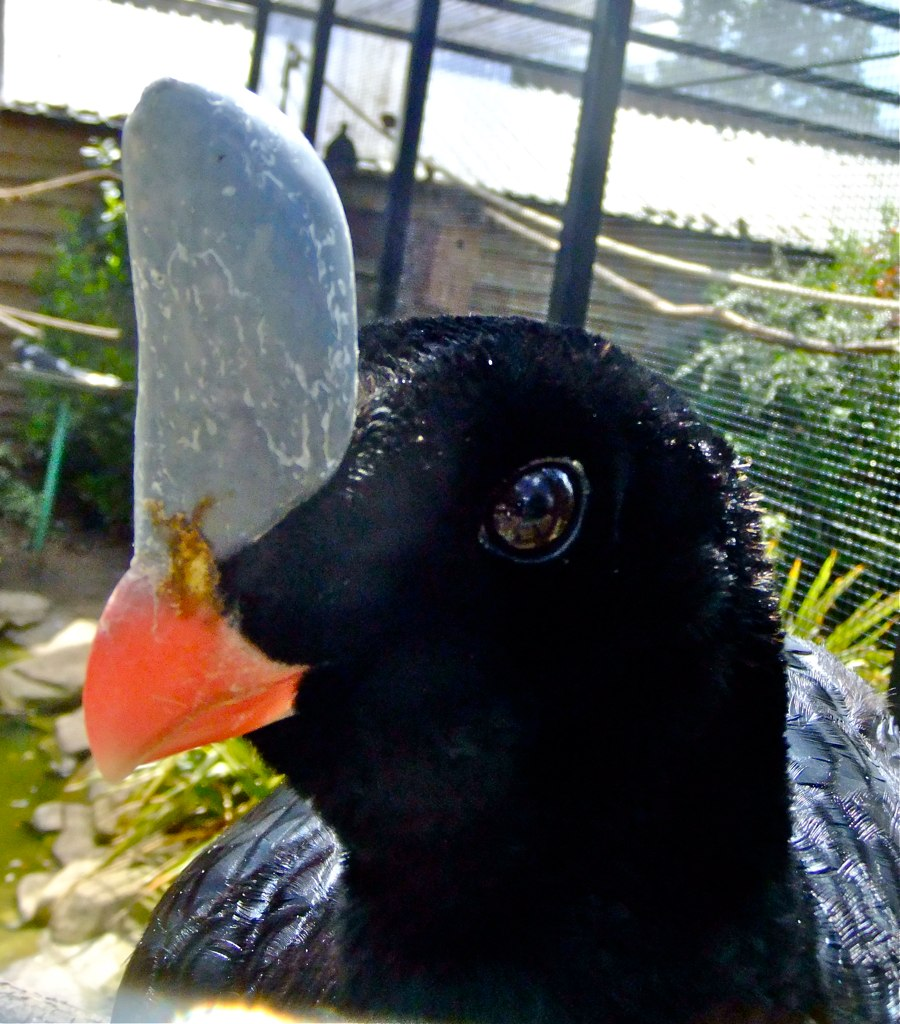

Conservation status
- Endangered (IUCN 3.1)

Scientific classification
- Kingdom: Animalia
- Phylum: Chordata
- Class: Aves
- Order: Galliformes
- Family: Cracidae
- Genus: Pauxi
- Species: P. unicornis

Binomial name
- Pauxi unicornis Bond, J & Meyer de Schauensee, 1939

Subspecies
- P. u. unicornis; P. u. koepckeae (now P. koepckeae)

Synonyms
- Crax unicornis (Bond & Meyer de Schauensee) Vuilleumier 1965

= Horned curassow =

Species of bird

The horned curassow (Pauxi unicornis), or southern helmeted curassow, is a species of bird in the family Cracidae found in humid tropical and subtropical forests. It was first described by James Bond and Rodolphe Meyer de Schauensee in 1939 from a specimen collected in Bolivia, and further birds that were described from Peru in 1971 were thought to be a new subspecies. However, the taxonomic position (as subspecies or independent species) of the birds found in Peru in 1971 is unclear. The horned curassow as originally described is endemic to Bolivia. It is a large, predominantly black bird with a distinctive casque on its forehead. It is an uncommon bird with a limited range and is suffering from habitat loss, and the International Union for Conservation of Nature has rated its conservation status as being "critically endangered".

== Taxonomy and systematics ==
In 1937 while in Bolivia Mr M. A. Carriker found two birds, a male and female, which were in the cracid family. The specimens were subsequently described as a new species by James Bond and Rodolphe Meyer de Schauensee in 1939 and given the scientific name Pauxi unicornis placing it in a genus Pauxi alongside the species P. pauxi. In 1969 another two birds, again a male and female were discovered which resembled those found by Mr. Carriker in 1937. However this time they were found in Peru a long way from the previous P. unicornis discoveries in Bolivia. These Peruvian specimens were described by John Weske and John Terborgh in 1971 as a new subspecies of P. unicornis which they named in honour of Maria Koepcke.

Although the consensus at the time of discovery for P. unicornis to be a species with two subspecies in the genus Pauxi, many different suggestions have been made since. Some suggestions relate to the grouping of species and subspecies within the genus Pauxi. In 1943 Wetmore and Phelps described a new subspecies of the closely related P. pauxi called P. p. gilliardi. When Wetmore and Phelps looked at the three Pauxi forms known at the time, they concluded that P. p. gilliardi was an intermediate form between P. pauxi and P. unicornis. As a result of this they grouped all three forms into a single species with unicornis becoming a subspecies of pauxi. This position was subsequently rejected by Charles Vaurie who argued that P. pauxi and P. unicornis were not conspecific. When Weske and Terborgh discovered the subspecies koepckeae they concluded pauxi and unicornis should be considered separate species. Additional studies by Gastañaga and coauthors in 2011 considered koepckeae to be a wholly distinct species on the basis of a somewhat smaller and more triangular crest and different vocalisations. Gastañaga et al. also coined the name Sira curassow as an English name for the bird in their 2011 paper; the name used by the local inhabitants for the bird is piuri.

Other taxonomic suggestions discuss whether the genus Pauxi should stand alone or be grouped with other genera. In 1965 François Vuilleumier suggested the Pauxi species should be moved into a single genus alongside all the other species in the closely related genera Mitu, Crax and Nothocrax. Just two years later Charles Vaurie opposed this 'lumping' of species and argued that Pauxi, Mitu, Crax and Nothocrax should each be their own genera. Not content with either of these two options Delacour and Amadon suggested that Pauxi and Mitu should indeed be grouped with Crax, but that Nothocrax was distinct enough to be its on genus. Many subsequent authors followed Vaurie, Delacour and Amadon in having Nothocrax as a sister clade to Pauxi, Mitu and Crax, while most have followed Vaurie in having the three other clades as three distinct genera.

Mitochondrial analysis conducted in 2004 suggests that P. unicornis is a sister species to Mitu tuberosum, while the other Pauxi species, P. pauxi, is sister to the combined Mitu and P. unicornis clade. This means the genus Pauxi is not monophyletic but paraphyletic, and to resolve this parsimoniously the genus Pauxi should be sunk into synonymy with Mitu. The paraphyly of Pauxi could be due to incomplete lineage sorting, where a gene tree is inconsistent with its species tree, however this phenomenon should be less prevalent in deep phylogenetic splits (i.e. between genera). Because of this, Pereira et al. conclude incomplete lineage sorting is unlikely to account for the paraphyletic Pauxi genera because, according to their own analysis, Mitu and Pauxi diverged approximately 6.5mya.

== Description ==
The horned curassow is among the largest cracid species. It measures 85 to 95 cm (33 to 37 in) in length. Body mass in large males is up to 3.7 to 3.9 kg (8.2 to 8.6 lb) and only the great curassow is heavier amongst the cracids, although the black curassow and the closely related helmeted curassow are around the same length. Among standard measurements, the wing chord is 38.1 to 40.2 cm (15.0 to 15.8 in), the tail is 31 to 34.8 cm (12.2 to 13.7 in) and the tarsus is 10 to 10.8 cm (3.9 to 4.3 in). It has a distinctive horn or casque on the forehead which projects for over 6 cm (2.4 in). The plumage is generally black, but lacks a blue sheen in primary feathers, and has a white belly, thigh tufts and under-tail coverts. The tail also has white tips.

== Status ==
The horned curassow is threatened by habitat loss. Until 2004 the horned curassow was classified as Vulnerable by the IUCN Red List due to a small and declining population, but was changed to Endangered in 2005 due to an estimated smaller range and greater risk from human activities. In Bolivia the potential habitat of subspecies P. unicornis unicornis may cover an area of 4,000 km^{2} (1,500 sq mi) including the national parks: Amboró, Carrasco and Isiboro Sécure. Despite concentrated fieldwork there are many parts of this potential habitat in which no individuals have been found, for example the most north west 2,000 km^{2} (770 sq mi).
