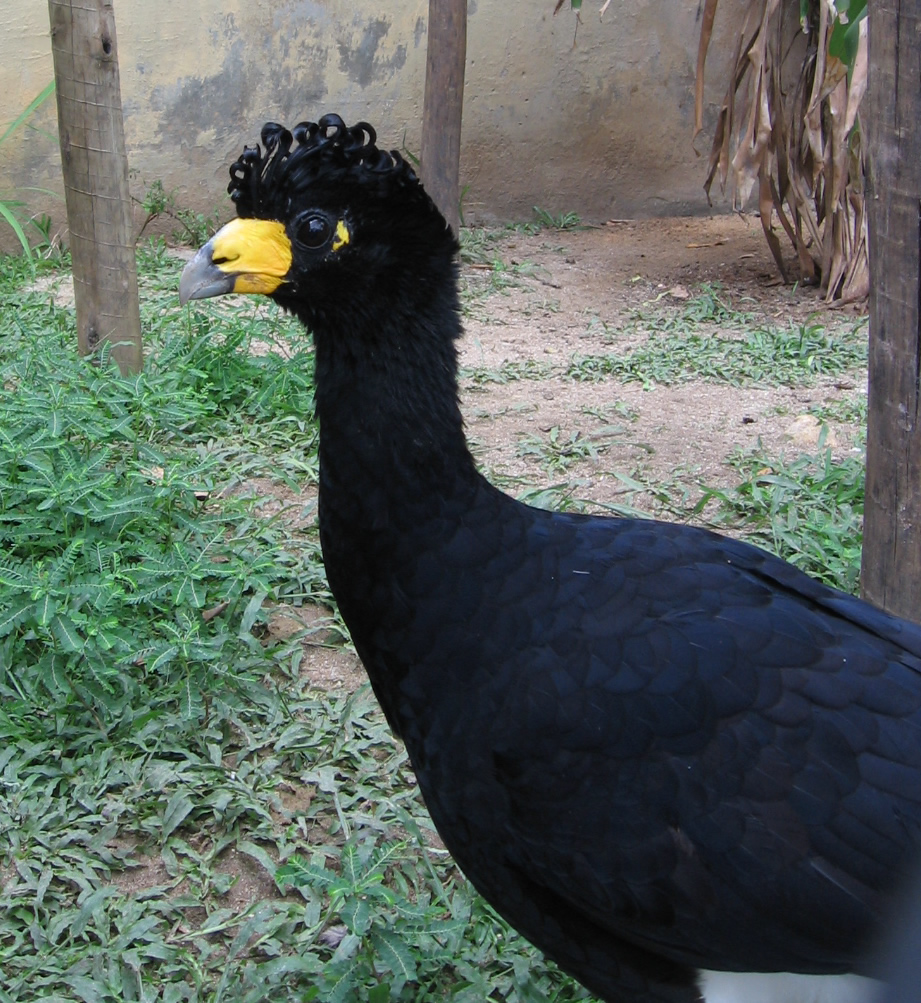
- Black curassow at the Bioparque do Rio

Conservation status
- Least Concern (IUCN 3.1)

Scientific classification
- Kingdom: Animalia
- Phylum: Chordata
- Class: Aves
- Order: Galliformes
- Family: Cracidae
- Genus: Crax
- Species: C. alector

Binomial name
- Crax alector Linnaeus, 1766

Synonyms
- Crax nigra (Linnaeus, 1766)

= Black curassow =

Species of bird

The black curassow (Crax alector), also known as the smooth-billed curassow and the crested curassow, is a species of bird in the family Cracidae, the chachalacas, guans, and curassows. It is found in humid forests in northern South America in Colombia, Venezuela, the Guianas including Suriname, and far northern Brazil, and is introduced to Bahamas, Cuba, Jamaica, Haiti, Dominican Republic, Puerto Rico and Lesser Antilles. It is the only Crax curassow where the male and female cannot be separated by plumage, as both are essentially black with a white crissum (the area around the cloaca), and have a yellow (eastern part of its range) or orange-red (western part of its range) cere.

== Taxonomy ==
There are two recognized subspecies:

- C. a. alector (Linnaeus, 1766) - eastern Colombia and Venezuela south of the Orinoco River
- C. a. erythrognatha (PL Sclater and Salvin, 1877) - extreme eastern Venezuela to the Guianas and Brazil north of the Amazon

== Description ==
The black curassow is a large bird reaching about 900 millimetres (35 in) in length. The male has black upper parts glossed with a purplish sheen and an inconspicuous black crest. The skin at the base of the grey beak is yellow or orange but there are no knobs and wattles. The underparts are white. The female is similar but the crest is barred with white, and the juvenile is black, barred and mottled with reddish-brown and reddish-buff.

== Behaviour ==
The black curassow is a largely ground-dwelling bird. It lives in the undergrowth in lowland forests and plantations and in riverside thickets. It mostly eats fruit, but also consumes buds, shoots, leaves, flowers, fungi and invertebrates. It nests a few meters above the ground in trees, the nest being a platform of sticks. Breeding takes place in the rainy season in Suriname while in French Guiana, young are reported in March and September.

== Status ==
Although the black curassow is fairly common, populations have been declining because of habitat loss, trapping and hunting. These threats are likely to continue, but the International Union for Conservation of Nature rates the bird's conservation status as least concern.
