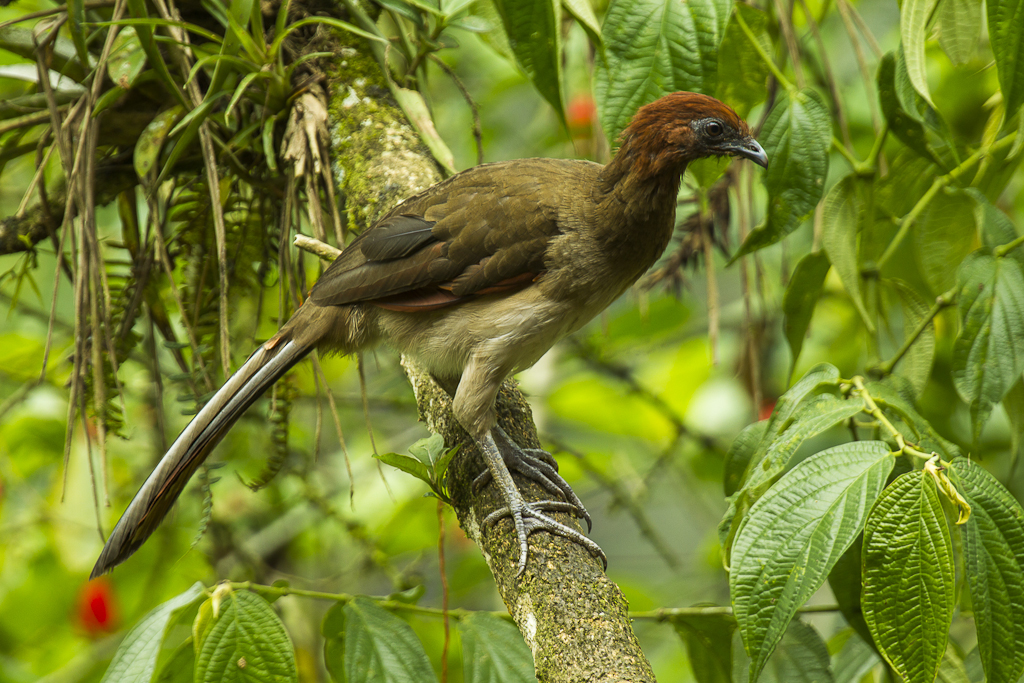

Conservation status
- Vulnerable (IUCN 3.1)

Scientific classification
- Domain: Eukaryota
- Kingdom: Animalia
- Phylum: Chordata
- Class: Aves
- Order: Galliformes
- Family: Cracidae
- Genus: Ortalis
- Species: O. erythroptera

Binomial name
- Ortalis erythroptera Sclater, PL & Salvin, 1870

= Rufous-headed chachalaca =

Species of bird

The rufous-headed chachalaca (Ortalis erythroptera) is a species of bird in the family Cracidae, the chachalacas, guans, and curassows. It is found in Colombia, Ecuador, and Peru.

== Taxonomy and systematics ==
The rufous-headed chachalaca is monotypic.

== Description ==
The rufous-headed chachalaca is 56 to 66 cm (1.8 to 2.2 ft) long and weighs 620 to 645 g (1.4 to 1.4 lb). It has a rufous head and neck and gray-brown back. The central tail feathers are dark gray and the outer ones gray near the body and chestnut on their outer halves. The lower breast and belly are creamy white. The primary flight feathers are bright chestnut. Its brown eye is surrounded by bare bluish gray skin. The legs are pale blue.

== Distribution and habitat ==
The rufous-headed chachalaca is found in extreme southwestern Colombia, extreme northwestern Peru, and in several small to medium-sized areas in western Ecuador. It inhabits dry, but not arid, deciduous forest and cloudforest in the coastal zone and Andean foothills. There are unconfirmed reports from savannah and brushy habitats. In elevation it generally ranges from sea level to 1,390 m (4,560 ft) but has been seen as high as 1,850 m (6,070 ft) and heard near 2,500 m (8,200 ft).

== Behavior ==
=== Feeding ===
The rufous-headed chachalaca typically forages in groups of two to seven. Its known diet is only fruit but it may also include leaves.

=== Breeding ===
The rufous-headed chachalaca's breeding season appears to parallel the January to May rainy season. Captive birds lay clutches of three eggs.

=== Vocalization ===
The rufous-headed chachalaca is most vocal from before dawn into the early morning. Its principal call is a "raucous, repeated 'kwak-ar-ar-ar', 'cha-cha-kaw' or shriller 'kra-kra-kra'", and is usually initiated by the male. Pairs give several calls "including a soft cooing or clucking, [a] harsh 'cow', and [a] fast, repeated 'kawuck'."

== Status ==
The IUCN has assessed the rufous-headed chachalaca as Vulnerable. Its range is fragmented and its population small and declining. Habitat destruction and hunting are the primary threats.
