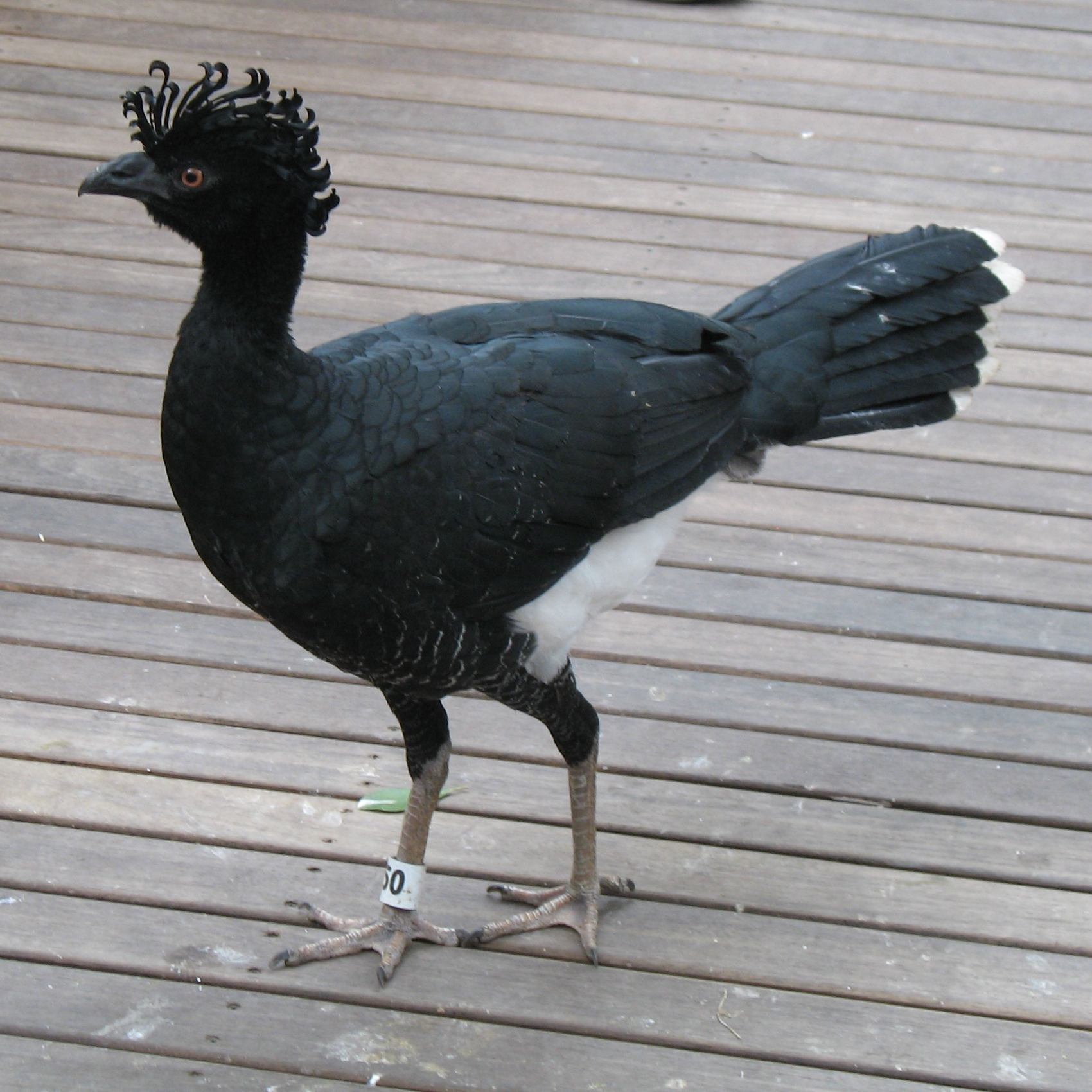
- Yellow-knobbed curassow (Crax daubentoni)

Scientific classification
- Kingdom: Animalia
- Phylum: Chordata
- Class: Aves
- Order: Galliformes
- Family: Cracidae; Rafinesque, 1815

Subfamilies
- Cracinae; Penelopinae

= Cracidae =

Cracidae Temporal range: Oligocene to recent

Family of birds

The chachalacas, guans, and curassows are birds in the family Cracidae. These are species of tropical and subtropical Central and South America. The range of one species, the plain chachalaca, just reaches southernmost parts of Texas in the United States. Two species, the Trinidad piping guan and the rufous-vented chachalaca occur on the islands of Trinidad and Tobago respectively.

== Systematics and evolution ==
The family Cracidae was introduced (as Craxia) by the French polymath Constantine Samuel Rafinesque in 1815. The Cracidae are an ancient group that were thought to be related to the Australasian mound-builders of family Megapodiidae. The two families were sometimes placed in a distinct order, Craciformes, as in Munroe and Sibley's 1993 World Checklist of Birds. However, the group is not monophyletic and more recent phylogenetic studies have found Megapodiidae and Cracidae to be successive early branching lineages of Galliformes.

- Galliformes
  - - Megapodiidae – megapodes (7 genera, 21 extant species)
    - - Cracidae – chachalacas, curassows, guans (11 genera, 57 species)
      - - Numididae – guineafowl (4 genera, 8 species)
        - - Odontophoridae – New World quail (10 genera, 34 species)
          - Phasianidae – pheasants & allies (54 genera, 188 species)

=== Internal Phylogeny ===
Cladogram based on the study by De Chen and collaborators published in 2021. The numbers of species are from the list maintained by Frank Gill, Pamela Rasmussen and David Donsker on behalf of the International Ornithologists' Union.

- Cracidae
  - - Penelopina – highland guan
    - - Chamaepetes – guans (2 species)
      - - Penelope – guans (16 species)
        - - Aburria – wattled guan
          - Pipile – piping guans (5 species)
  - - Oreophasis – horned guan
    - - Ortalis – chachalacas (16 species)
      - - Crax – curassows (7 species)
        - - Pauxi – curassows (3 species)
          - - Mitu – curassows (4 species)
            - Nothocrax – nocturnal curassow

=== Classification ===
Extinct species assignment follows the Mikko's Phylogeny Archive and Paleofile.com websites.

- Genus †Procrax Tordoff & Macdonald 1957
  - †Procrax brevipes Tordoff & Macdonald 1957
- Genus †Paleophasianus Wetmore 1940
  - †Paleophasianus meleagroides Wetmore 1940
- Genus †Taoperdix Milne-Edwards 1869
  - †Taoperdix pesseiti (Gervais 1862) Milne-Edwards 1869
- Subfamily Penelopinae (Guans)
  - Genus Aburria Reichenbach 1853
    - Subgenus (Aburria)
      - Wattled guan, Aburria aburri (Lesson 1828) Reichenbach 1853
    - Subgenus (Pipile) Bonaparte 1856 (piping guans)
      - Black-fronted piping guan, Pipile jacutinga (von Spix 1825)
      - Red-throated piping guan, Pipile cujubi (Pelzeln 1858)
      - Trinidad piping guan, Pipile pipile (Jacquin 1784)
      - Blue-throated piping guan, Pipile cumanensis (Jacquin 1784)
      - White-throated piping guan, Pipile grayi (Pelzeln 1858)
  - Genus Chamaepetes Wagler 1832
    - Black guan, Chamaepetes unicolor Salvin 1867
    - Sickle-winged guan, Chamaepetes goudotii (Lesson 1828)
  - Genus Penelope Merrem 1786 (15 species)
    - Band-tailed guan, Penelope argyrotis (Bonaparte 1856)
    - Bearded guan, Penelope barbata Chapman 1921
    - Baudo guan, Penelope ortoni Salvin 1874
    - Andean guan, Penelope montagnii (Bonaparte 1856)
    - Marail guan, Penelope marail (Müller 1776)
    - Rusty-margined guan, Penelope superciliaris Temminck 1815
    - Red-faced/Dabbene's guanPenelope dabbenei Hellmayr & Conover 1942
    - Crested guan, Penelope purpurascens Wagler 1830
    - Cauca guan, Penelope perspicax Bangs 1911
    - White-winged guan, Penelope albipennis Taczanowski 1878
    - Spix's guan, Penelope jacquacu von Spix 1825
    - Dusky-legged guan, Penelope obscura Temminck 1815
    - White-crested guan, Penelope pileata Wagler 1830
    - Chestnut-bellied guan, Penelope ochrogaster Pelzeln 1870
    - White-browed guan, Penelope jacucaca von Spix 1825
  - Genus Penelopina Reichenbach 1861
    - Highland guan, Penelopina nigra (Fraser 1852) Reichenbach 1861
- Subfamily Cracinae
  - Tribe Ortalidini Donegan 2012
    - Genus Ortalis Merrem 1786 (chachalacas, 16 species)
      - †Ortalis affinis Feduccia & Wilson 1967
      - †Ortalis phengites Wetmore 1923
      - †Ortalis pollicaris Miller 1944
      - †Ortalis tantala Wetmore 1933
      - Plain chachalaca, Ortalis vetula (Wagler 1830)
      - Grey-headed chachalaca, Ortalis cinereiceps Gray 1867
      - Chestnut-winged chachalaca, Ortalis garrula (von Humboldt 1805)
      - Rufous-vented chachalaca, Ortalis ruficauda Jardine 1847
      - Rufous-headed chachalaca, Ortalis erythroptera Sclater & Salvin 1870
      - Rufous-bellied chachalaca, Ortalis wagleri Gray 1867
      - West Mexican chachalaca Ortalis poliocephala (Wagler 1830)
      - Chaco chachalaca, Ortalis canicollis (Wagler 1830)
      - White-bellied chachalaca, Ortalis leucogastra (Gould 1843)
      - Speckled chachalaca, Ortalis guttata (von Spix 1825)
      - Colombian chachalaca, Ortalis columbiana Hellmayr 1906
      - East Brazilian chachalaca Ortalis araucuan (von Spix 1825)
      - Scaled chachalaca, Ortalis squamata Lesson 1829
      - Little/variable/Guiana chachalaca, Ortalis motmot (Linnaeus 1766)
      - Chestnut-headed chachalaca, Ortalis ruficeps (Wagler 1830)
      - Buff-browed chachalaca, Ortalis superciliaris Gray 1867
  - Tribe Oreophasini Bonaparte 1853
    - Genus Oreophasis Gray 1844
      - Horned guan, Oreophasis derbianus Gray 1844
  - Tribe Cracini Rafinesque 1815 (curassows)
    - Genus Crax Linnaeus 1758 (7 species)
      - Great curassow, Crax rubra Linnaeus 1758
      - Prince Albert's/Blue-billed/knobbed curassow, Crax alberti Fraser 1852
      - Yellow-knobbed curassow, Crax daubentoni Gray 1867
      - Globulose/Wattled/Yarrell's curassow, Crax globulosa von Spix 1825
      - Red-billed curassow, Crax blumenbachii von Spix 1825
      - Black curassow, Crax alector Linnaeus 1766
      - Bare-faced curassow, Crax fasciolata von Spix 1825
    - Genus Mitu Lesson 1831 (razor-billed curassows)
      - Crestless curassow, Mitu tomentosum (von Spix 1825)
      - Salvin's curassow, Mitu salvini Reinhardt 1879
      - Razor-billed curassow, Mitu tuberosum (von Spix 1825)
      - Alagoas curassow, Mitu mitu (Linnaeus 1766) (extinct in the wild)
    - Genus Nothocrax Burmeister 1856
      - Nocturnal curassow, Nothocrax urumutum (von Spix 1825) Burmeister 1856
    - Genus Pauxi Temminck 1813 (helmeted curassows)
      - Horned curassow, Pauxi unicornis Bond & Meyer de Schauensee 1939
      - Sira curassow, Pauxi koepckeae Weske & Terborgh 1971
      - Helmeted curassow, Pauxi pauxi (Linnaeus 1766) Temminck 1813

Alternatively, all subfamilies except the Penelopinae could be lumped into the Cracinae. As the initial radiation of cracids is not well resolved at present (see below), the system used here seems more appropriate. It is also quite probable that entirely extinct subfamilies exist as the fossil record is utterly incomplete.

=== Evolution ===
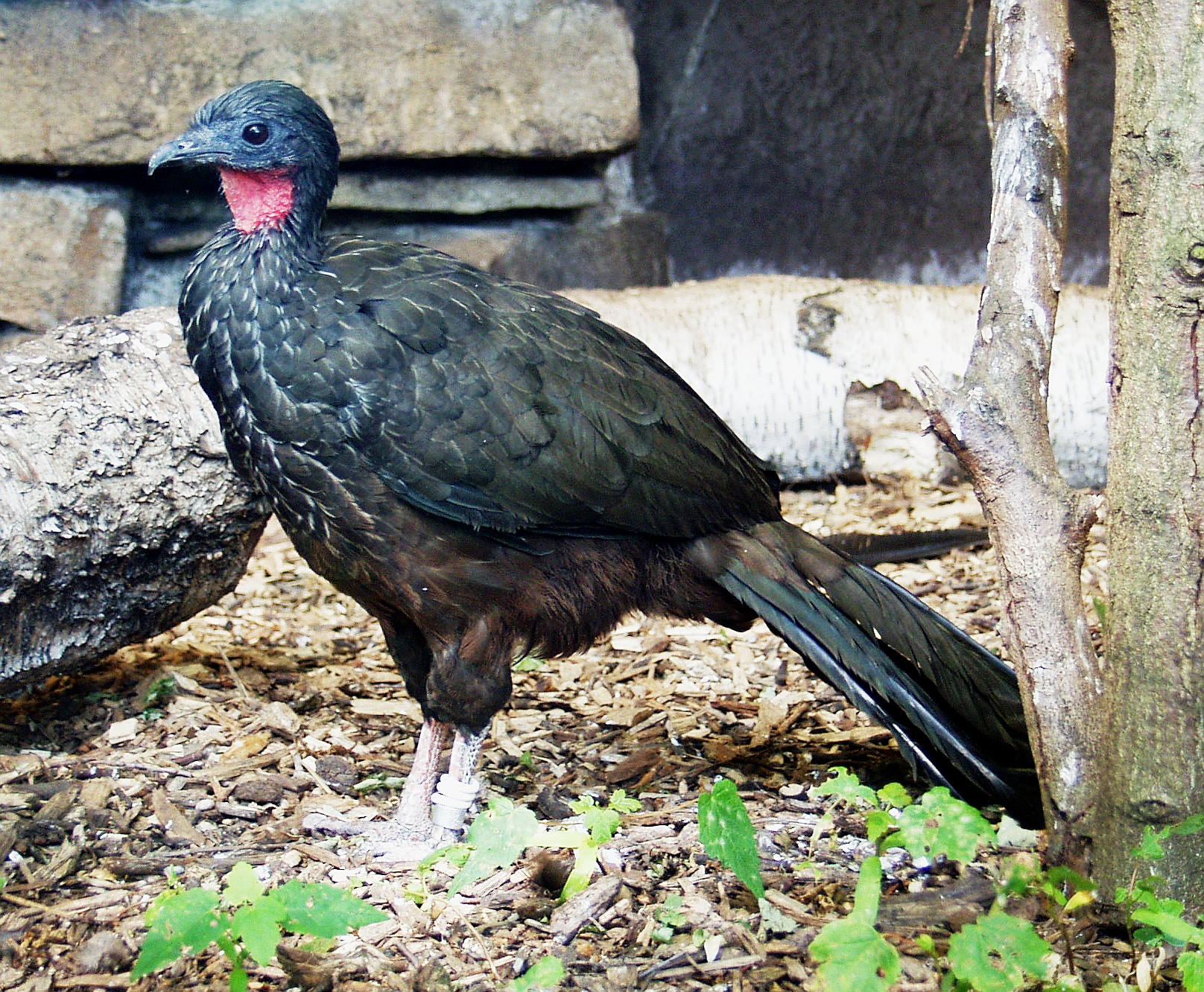
Spix's guan, Penelope jacquacu.

Recent research has analyzed mt and nDNA sequences, morphological, and biogeographical data to study the phylogenetic relationships of cracid birds, namely the relationships among the genera (Pereira et al., 2002), the relationships between the species of curassows (Pereira & Baker, 2004) and between the piping- and wattled guans (Grau et al., 2005). The traditional groups—chachalacas, guans, and curassows—are verified as distinct clades, but the horned guan represents the sole survivor of a very distinct and ancient lineage.

In addition, the molecular data suggest that the Cracidae originated in the Late Cretaceous, but the authors caution that this cannot be more than a hypothesis at present: as the rate of molecular evolution is neither constant over time nor uniform between genera and even species, dating based on molecular information has a very low accuracy over such long timespans and needs to be corroborated by fossil evidence. The fossil record of cracids is limited to a single doubtfully distinct genus of chachalaca, Boreortalis (Hawthorn Early Miocene of Florida, USA; may actually be a junior synonym of Ortalis) and some species in the modern genus Ortalis, however. This does not provide any assistance in evaluating the hypothesis (Pereira et al., 2002) that the split between the 4 main lineages of our time occurred quite rapidly, approximately in the Oligocene or slightly earlier, somewhere between 40 and 20 mya.

The genera Procrax and Palaeonossax are often considered cracids, but this is not certain at all; they may belong to a related extinct lineage. Of these too, few good fossils are known, as they date to about the time when the modern groups presumably diverged. Should they be cracids, they are not unlikely to represent either some of the last members of the family before guans, chachalacas, etc. evolved, or very early representatives of these lineages.

Thus, the assumption that the modern diversity started to evolve in the late Paleogene, continuing throughout the Miocene and onwards, must also be considered hypothetical given the lack of robust evidence. Still, the "molecular" scenario is entirely possible considering what is known about the evolution and radiation of the Galloanserae, and consistent with the paleogeography of the Americas. The ichnotaxon Tristraguloolithus cracioides is based on fossil eggshell fragments from the Late Cretaceous Oldman Formation of southern Alberta, Canada which are similar to chachalaca eggs (Zelenitsky et al., 1996), but in the absence of bone material their relationships cannot be determined except that they are apparently not from a dinosaur.

By comparison, speciation within curassows (Crax, Nothocrax, Pauxi, and Mitu) and the piping/wattled guans is supported by better evidence. It was usually caused by changes in topography which divided populations (vicariant speciation), mainly due to the uplift of the Andes which led to the establishment of the modern river basins. The distribution of curassow and piping-guan species for the most part follows the layout of these river systems, and in the latter case, apparently many extinctions of populations in lowland areas (Grau et al., 2005). Another result was that the wattled guan belongs to the same genus as the piping-guans, which thus use the older name Aburria (Grau et al., 2005).

Originally interpreted as a turkey by Othniel Charles Marsh, Meleagris antiquus was referred to as Cracidae in 1964 by Pierce Brodkorb. It is nowadays considered unambiguously to be a Cariamiformes under Bathornithidae, and indeed a very different animal from cracids, being a 2-meter-tall (6.6 ft) terrestrial predator. Similarly, Palaeophasianus has been reassigned to Geranoididae, a lineage of large, ostrich-like stem-cranes.

== Description ==
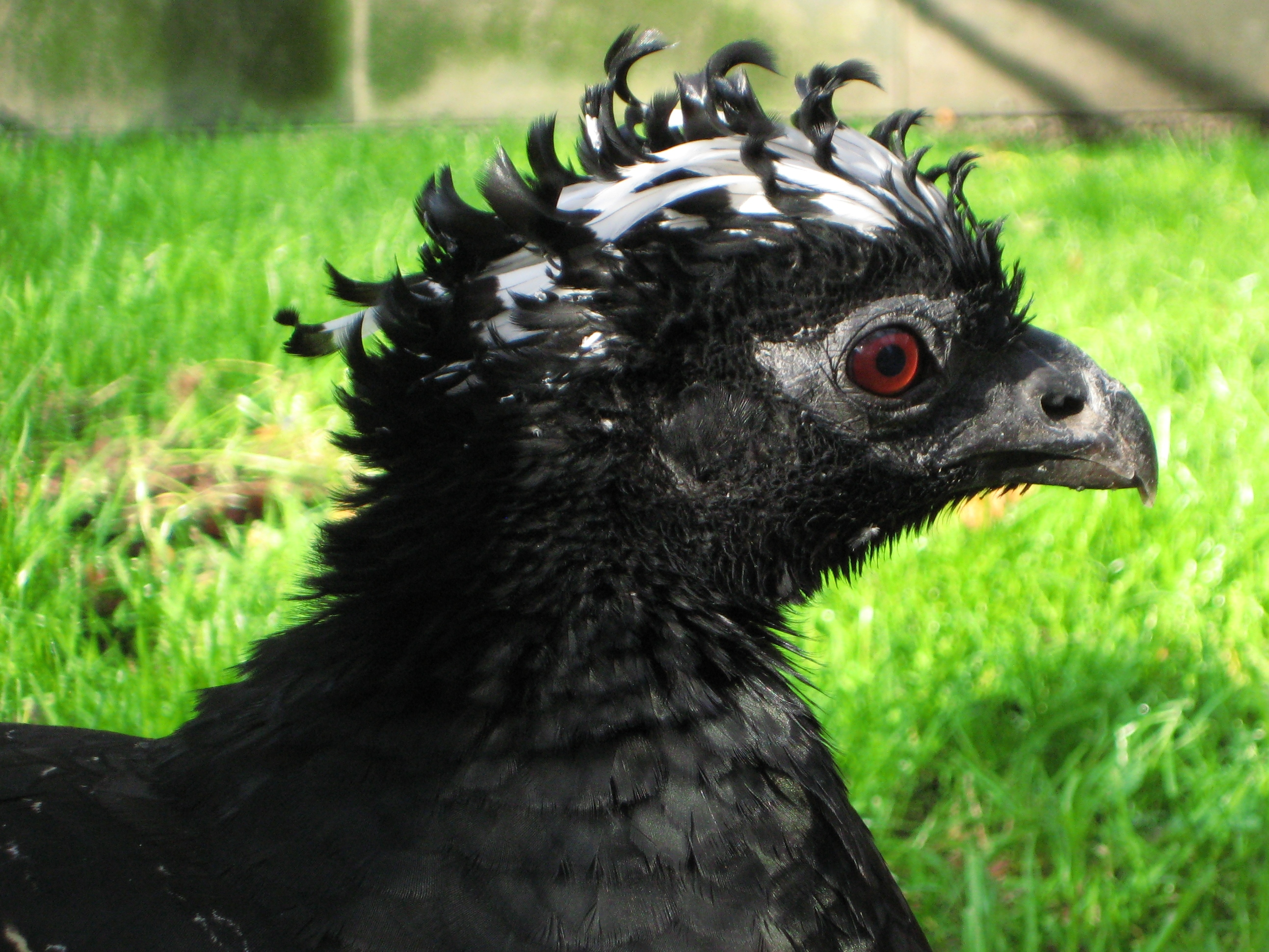
Bare-faced curassow (Crax fasciolata)

Cracids are large birds, similar in general appearance to turkeys. The guans and curassows live in trees, but the smaller chachalacas are found in more open scrubby habitats. Many species are fairly long tailed, which may be an aide to navigating their largely arboreal existence. They are generally dull-plumaged, but the curassows and some guans have colourful facial ornaments. The birds in this family are particularly vocal, with the chachalacas taking their name from the sound of their call. Cracids range in size from the little chachalaca (Ortalis motmot), at as little as 38 cm (15 in) and 350 g (12 oz), to the great curassow (Crax rubra), at nearly 1 m (39 in) and 4.3 kg (9.5 lb).

== Behaviour and ecology ==
These species feed on fruit, insects and worms. They build nests in trees, and lay two to three large white eggs, which only the female incubates alone. The young are precocial and are born with an instinct to immediately climb and seek refuge in the nesting tree. They are able to fly within days of hatching.
