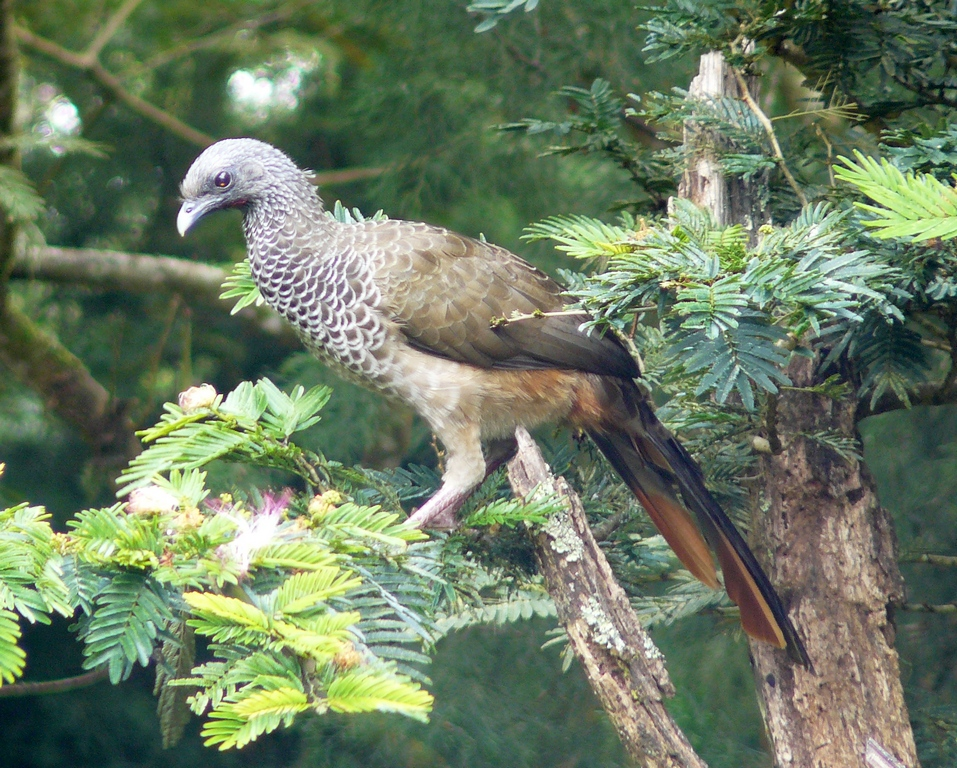

Conservation status
- Least Concern (IUCN 3.1)

Scientific classification
- Kingdom: Animalia
- Phylum: Chordata
- Class: Aves
- Order: Galliformes
- Family: Cracidae
- Genus: Ortalis
- Species: O. columbiana

Binomial name
- Ortalis columbiana Hellmayr, 1906

= Colombian chachalaca =

Species of bird

The Colombian chachalaca (Ortalis columbiana) is a species of bird in the family Cracidae. It is endemic to the forests and woodlands in the inter-Andean valleys in Colombia. Colombian chachalacas are frugivorous and lead an arboreal lifestyle. The large seeds they disperse through defecation support the maintenance of diverse tropical forests.

== Taxonomy and systematics ==
The species was first formally described in 1906 by the Austrian ornithologist Carl Eduard Hellmayr. He based his observations on specimens in the Bavarian State Museum that had been obtained during Johann Baptist von Spix's 1817–1820 expedition to South America. Hellmayr noted significant differences in the plumage of two specimens that separated them from the Speckled chachalaca that von Spix had previously described.

All four taxonomic authorities recognize the Colombian chachalaca as a distinct species. It is generally considered to be monotypic, but some authorities recognize two subspecies: the nominate O. c. columbiana, native to the upper Magdalena River basin, and O. c. caucae, which is found in the Cauca River valley.

== Description ==
The Colombian chachalaca is a typical Ortalis species – a large, plump forest bird with a long slender neck, small head, long and robust legs (tarsi) and a long tail.

Size. Adults of this species have a length of 50–60 cm. The average wing length is 22.5 cm (males)/ 19.6 cm (females), and the average tail length is 25 and 24 cm respectively. Tarsi average 6 cm (males) and 5.8 cm (females). Adult bird have a typical mass of 600g (male), and 500g (female).

Appearance. Similar/identical for both sexes. The upperparts are mostly brown, shading to greyish-brown on the primaries and secondaries. The outer feathers of the tail are rufous-brown. The head and neck are grey, with a red dewlap on the neck. The breast feathers are grey with prominent white scalloping, a distinguishing characteristic compared to the similar-looking speckled chachalaca. The belly is buffy with rufous shading on the thighs and flanks and rufous undertail coverts.

The legs and feet are pinkish. The bill is dark grey at the base shading to white at the tip. The iris is dark brown, and a patch of grey bare skin encircles the eye.

== Distribution and habitat ==
The species is endemic to the Cauca and Magdalena valleys of Colombia. It was once a fairly widespread species, but after many years of hunting pressure and habitat loss it has been extirpated from many former range areas. Its current distribution is highly fragmented, with small, localized populations remaining the upper river valleys: in the Magdalena from Huila Department to Santander, and in the Cauca valley from Cauca Department to Antioquia.

The Colombian chachalaca is a bird of the upper tropical zone, typically found on the edges of dry to humid forests and mature second growth. It can survive in degraded habitat – areas of scrub and thickets – and is relatively tolerant of human habitation in areas where it is not persecuted. However, research indicates that it is more likely to prosper in mature forests, where it can use fallen tree trunks for foraging, shelter, and nesting between tree roots.

== Behaviour and ecology ==
Colombian chachalacas are arboreal, spending most of their time in forests where they typically forage from the mid-level to the canopy. They prefers trees with good food supplies, primarily Ficus or Cecropia species. They will fly within and between trees but do not usually undertake long flights.

These birds are social, and groups of up to 20 individuals have been seen. They can be noisy, engaging in choruses of the chac-a-lac call that gives them their name.

Breeding

Little is known about the breeding habits of this species. Colombian chachalacas are presumed to be monogamous and possibly to hold territories during breeding. Records from the Magdalena valley of a female with a swollen brood patch, a male with extended testes and a half-grown young bird, were recorded in the month of February, indicating the time of the breeding season in that area.

Food and feeding

Colombian chachalacas, and Cracids in general, are highly frugivorous. Large frugivores play a key role in maintaining the diversity of tropical forests as the defecation of indigestible large seeds helps to dispersing the parent plant species – if large frugivores are not present in an area it will become dominated by fast-growing species with smaller fruits and seeds.

This species typically forages in pairs and small groups. In the Cauca valley their diet was found to comprise 26 species of plants, including fruits (77.2%), leaves (16.2%), and flowers (3.6%). They also occasionally ate soil, dead leaves, and stones (3%). Many of the seeds defecated by Colombian chachalacas were shown to germinate at a higher rate than those extracted directly from fruit.

== Status ==
This species is rated as Least Concern on the IUCN Red List. While noting that the range and numbers of this species are declining, the decline is not considered to meet the threshold of a 30% decline over ten years that would trigger a rating of Vulnerable. Similarly, though the population size has not been quantified, it does not appear meet the Vulnerable criteria of under 10 000 individuals with a continuing decline of 10% per ten years. The species also appears to be somewhat tolerant of sub-optimal habitat and proximity to human habitation.

Threats

While the Colombian chachalaca can suffer predation from large raptors such as the Ornate hawk-eagle, hunting by humans appears to be the primary threat, followed by habitat loss and fragmentation.

Conservation efforts

No conservation activities specific to this species are in effect.
