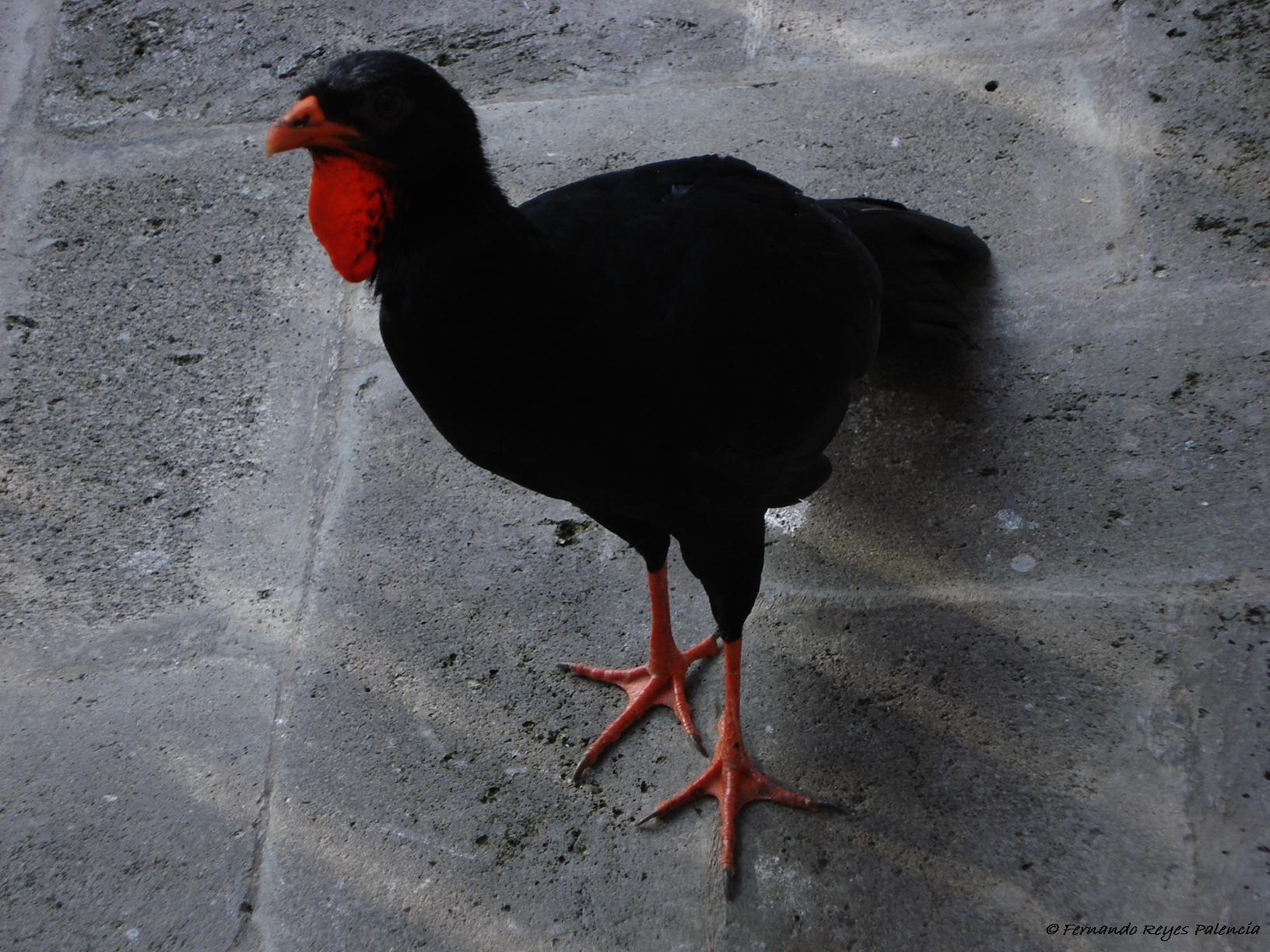
- male

Conservation status
- Vulnerable (IUCN 3.1)

Scientific classification
- Kingdom: Animalia
- Phylum: Chordata
- Class: Aves
- Order: Galliformes
- Family: Cracidae
- Genus: Penelopina; Reichenbach, 1861
- Species: P. nigra

Binomial name
- Penelopina nigra (Fraser, 1852)

= Highland guan =

Species of bird

The highland guan (Penelopina nigra) is a species of bird in the family Cracidae. It is found in the highlands of El Salvador, Guatemala, Honduras, southern Mexico, and Nicaragua.

Its natural habitat is subtropical or tropical moist montane forest. Its population has declined much in recent times: Listed as a species of Least Concern in 1994, it was uplisted to Near Threatened in 2000 and, as it was determined to be less common than previously believed, to Vulnerable in the 2007 IUCN Red List.

== Description ==
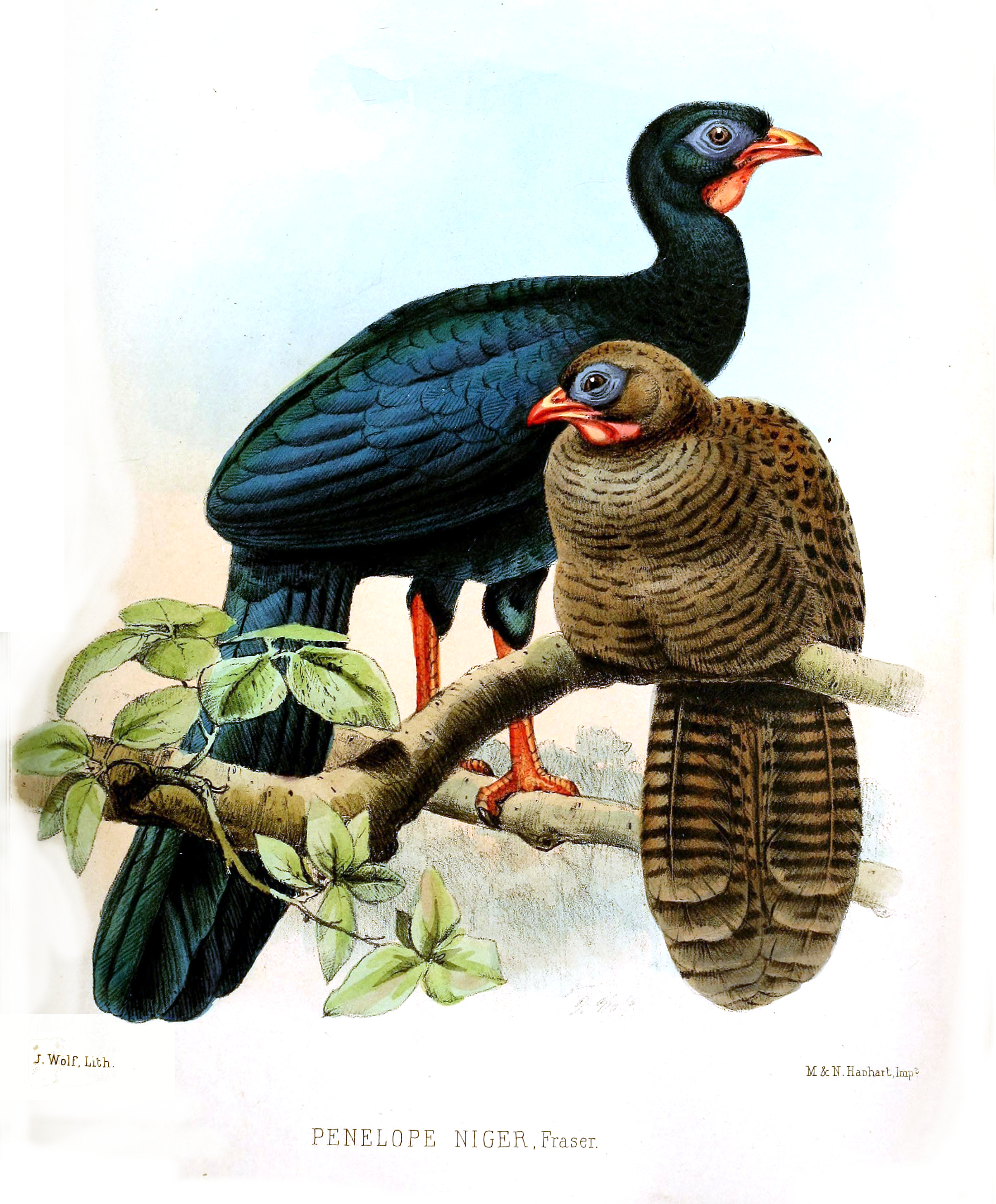
Male (blue-black) and female (brown)

The highland guan grows to a length of 590 to 650 millimetres (23 to 26 in). The plumage of the male is black, the upper parts glossed with green or blue, the underparts rather duller. The iris of the eye is reddish-brown and there is reddish-brown or purplish bare skin around and behind the eye. The beak, the bare skin on the throat, the large wattle, the legs and feet are reddish-orange. The female, by contrast, is black, heavily mottled and barred with reddish-brown and cinnamon, with a red beak and bare skin round the beak, and purplish bare skin round the eye.

== Taxonomy ==
The three syntype specimens of Penelope niger Fraser (Proc. Zool. Soc. London, 1850 (1852), p.246, pl.XXIX.) are held in the collections of National Museums Liverpool at World Museum, with accession numbers D484 (male adult) and D484a (female adult) and D484b (male adult). The specimens came to the Liverpool national collection via the 13th Earl of Derby's collection which was bequeathed to the people of Liverpool in 1851. D484 and D484a were purchased from Mess. Leadbeater in September 1843 while D484b died at the menagerie at Knowsley Hall on 5 August 1850.

== Distribution and habitat ==
The highland guan is found on either side of the mountain ranges in Central America. In Mexico it is uncommon, but it is present in moderate numbers in the El Triunfo Biosphere Reserve. It is also common in some localities in Guatemala, but rather rarer in Honduras, north-central Nicaragua and El Salvador, and it may be extinct in El Salvador. Its habitat is humid broad-leaved mountain forests, mainly cloud forests and pine-oak forests, but it has also been observed in secondary forests and plantations. The bird forages for fruit, in the trees and on the leaf litter.

== Status ==
The highland guan is thought to be decreasing in numbers. The main threats it faces are the destruction of its forest habitat, and being hunted for food. The International Union for Conservation of Nature has assessed its conservation status as "vulnerable".
