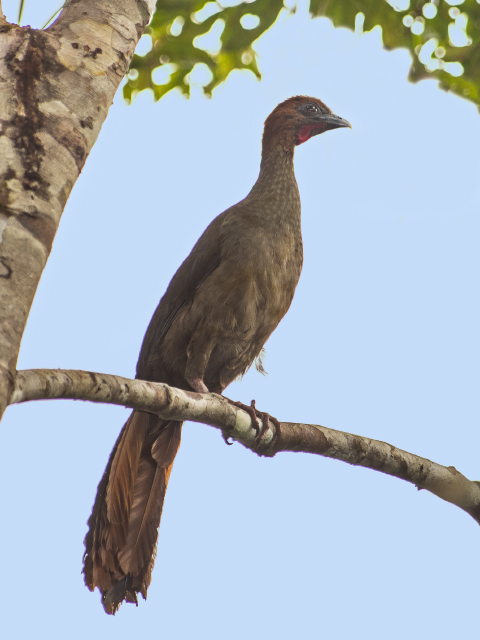

Conservation status
- Least Concern (IUCN 3.1)

Scientific classification
- Kingdom: Animalia
- Phylum: Chordata
- Class: Aves
- Order: Galliformes
- Family: Cracidae
- Genus: Ortalis
- Species: O. motmot

Binomial name
- Ortalis motmot (Linnaeus, 1766)

Synonyms
- Phasianus motmot Linnaeus, 1766

= Little chachalaca =

Species of bird

The little chachalaca (Ortalis motmot) is a bird in the family Cracidae, the chachalacas, guans, and curassows. It is found in Brazil, French Guiana, Suriname, Guyana, Venezuela and possibly Colombia.

== Taxonomy and systematics ==
In 1760 the French zoologist Mathurin Jacques Brisson included a description of the little chachalaca in his Ornithologie based on a specimen collected in French Guiana. He used the French name Le faisan de la Guiane and the Latin Phasianus guianensis. Although Brisson coined Latin names, these do not conform to the binomial system and are not recognised by the International Commission on Zoological Nomenclature. When in 1766 the Swedish naturalist Carl Linnaeus updated his Systema Naturae for the twelfth edition, he added 240 species that had been previously described by Brisson. One of these was the little chachalaca. Linnaeus included a brief description, coined the binomial name Phasianus motmot and cited Brisson's work. The specific name had been used by the Dutch zoologist Albertus Seba in 1734 when he had misapplied the Aztec name motmot to a chachalaca. The species is now placed in the genus Ortalis that was introduced by the German naturalist Blasius Merrem in 1786 with the little chachalaca as the type species.

The little chachalaca was previously considered conspecific with the speckled chachalaca (Ortalis guttata) and buff-browed chachalaca (O. superciliaris). What is now the chestnut-headed chachalaca (O. ruficeps) was previously a subspecies of what was then called variable chachalaca. (Confusingly, after the split the International Ornithological Committee (IOC) renamed O. motmot "little chachalaca" but the American Ornithological Society (AOS) and the Clements taxonomy retained the name "variable" for it.) As currently understood, the little chachalaca is monotypic.

== Description ==
The little chachalaca is 43 to 54 cm (1.4 to 1.8 ft) long and weighs 345 to 620 g (0.76 to 1.4 lb). Its head is reddish chestnut, its upperparts reddish brown to gray-brown, and its underparts gray. Its central tail feathers are gray-brown and the outer ones rusty. Its primary flight feathers are dark brown. Its facial skin is dark slate gray.

== Distribution and habitat ==
The little chachalaca is found from southern and eastern Venezuela east through the Guianas into northern Brazil and south to the Amazon River east of the Rio Negro. The AOS considers it hypothetical in Colombia. It inhabits landscapes such as the undergrowth along rivers, in clearings, and abandoned pastures; dense secondary forest; and coastal brush. It shuns the interior of dense forest. In elevation it ranges from sea level to 1,700 m (5,600 ft).

== Behavior ==
=== Feeding ===
The little chachalaca forages in trees or on the ground, usually in pairs or small flocks. Its primary diet is berries and fruits although it also eats flowers and leaves.

=== Breeding ===
The little chachalaca has been recorded laying eggs in May, September, and December in the Guianas; there are no data from elsewhere. It builds a small cup nest of roots, leaves, and sticks and places it fairly low in a shrub or tree. The clutch size is three eggs.

=== Vocalization ===
The little chachalaca's song is "a loud, rollicking duet, a repeated 'WATCH-a-lak', which is mainly given at dawn and dusk".
