= Sira curassow =

Conservation status
- Critically Endangered (IUCN 3.1)

Scientific classification
- Kingdom: Animalia
- Phylum: Chordata
- Class: Aves
- Order: Galliformes
- Family: Cracidae
- Genus: Pauxi
- Species: P. koepckeae

Binomial name
- Pauxi koepckeae Weske & Terborgh, 1971

Synonyms
- Pauxi unicornis koepckeae

Species of bird

The Sira curassow (Pauxi koepckeae) is a species of bird in the family Cracidae. It is found in the Cerros del Sira in central Peru. Its natural habitat is tropical, moist, montane cloud forest.

It was first discovered in 1969, when a male and female were recovered (unfortunately the female specimen was accidentally eaten), and was not recorded by scientists again until 2000 and 2003, when local Asháninka people were shown pictures of the birds and respectively 1 and 14 people recalled having seen or hunted them in the past few years. (Note: Note that an Asháninka name was recorded for the bird in the 1990s, thus indicating scientists were recording its existence at the time.)

The name 'Sira curassow' was proposed as a new English common name in 2011 by Gastañaga et al. to replace the previous 'horned curassow', in 2012 this proposal was adopted by most of her colleagues. In the Asháninka language of the area the bird is known as quiyuri according to Weske & Terborgh [1971], piyori according to the report 'Nombres Asháninka de las Aves en la Cordillera el Sira' by González [1998], or piuri according to Gastañaga [2005].

== Taxonomy and systematics ==
In 1969 two birds, a male and female, were discovered in Peru which resembled horned curassow. However they were found a long way from the previous P. unicornis discoveries in Bolivia. These Peruvian specimens were described by John Weske and John Terborgh in 1971 as a new subspecies of P. unicornis which they named in honour of Maria Koepcke.

Many different suggestions have been regarding species status since their discovery. Some suggestions relate to the grouping of species and subspecies within the genus Pauxi. In 1943 Wetmore and Phelps described a new subspecies of the closely related P. pauxi called P. p. gilliardi. When Wetmore and Phelps looked at the three Pauxi forms known at the time, they concluded that P. p. gilliardi was an intermediate form between P. pauxi and P. unicornis. As a result of this they grouped all three forms into a single species with unicornis becoming a subspecies of pauxi. This position was subsequently rejected by Charles Vaurie who argued that P. pauxi and P. unicornis were not conspecific. When Weske and Terborgh discovered the subspecies koepckeae they concluded pauxi and unicornis should be considered separate species, which has been followed by all subsequent authors.

"Through an unfortunate misunderstanding, the female was plucked and prepared for the stewpot by our Peruvian assistants, who did not realize that we wished to preserve both birds as skins."
— The unfortunate turn of events after two birds of P. unicornis koepckeae were discovered for the first time.

Other taxonomic suggestions discuss whether the genus Pauxi should stand alone or be grouped with other genera. In 1965 François Vuilleumier suggested the two Pauxi species should be moved into a single genus alongside all the other species in the closely related genera Mitu, Crax and Nothocrax. Just two years later Charles Vaurie opposed this 'lumping' of species and argued that Pauxi, Mitu, Crax and Nothocrax should each be their own genera. Not content with either of these two options Delacour and Amadon suggested that Pauxi and Mitu should indeed be grouped with Crax, but that Nothocrax was distinct enough to be its on genus. Many subsequent authors followed Vaurie, Delacour and Amadon in having Nothocrax as a sister clade to Pauxi, Mitu and Crax, while most have followed Vaurie in having the three other clades as three distinct genera.

Mitochondrial analysis conducted in 2004 suggests that P. unicornis is a sister species to Mitu tuberosum, while the other Pauxi species, P. pauxi, is sister to the combined Mitu and P. unicornis clade. This means the genus Pauxi is not monophyletic but paraphyletic, and to resolve this parsimoniously the genus Pauxi should be sunk into synonymy with Mitu. The paraphyly of Pauxi could be due to incomplete lineage sorting, where a gene tree is inconsistent with its species tree, however this phenomenon should be less prevalent in deep phylogenetic splits (i.e. between genera). Because of this, Pereira et al. conclude incomplete lineage sorting is unlikely to account for the paraphyletic genus Pauxi because, according to their own analysis, Mitu and Pauxi diverged approximately 6.5mya. Note that Pereira et al. were not working with any samples of P. koepckeae.

A study from 2011 suggests that P. koepckeae be raised to species status as opposed to subspecies based on vocal, behavioural, ecological, and morphological differences. P. koepckeae is only known from a very small geographic area and a small number of specimens (only 3, as of 2009). According to a website, as of 2015, there are only two photos of the birds in existence, although this is incorrect.

== Description ==
According to Weske et al., based on a single individual bird, the Sira curassow is very similar morphologically to the horned curassow, however the casque is less erect and more rounded (ellipsoidal instead of elongated cone). Additionally the outer tail feathers have narrower white tips and the four central tail feather completely lack white colouring, although this last characteristic appears to be very variable and perhaps not diagnostic.

== Conservation ==
The Sira curassow is listed as critically endangered by BirdLife International for the IUCN as they believe it is threatened by habitat destruction and is hunted for meat. The birds population is believed by BirdLife International in 2016 to be below 250 individuals, citing the 2014 IUCN assessment by Gastañaga for BirdLife International (no longer available online). In the 2016 IUCN assessment by BirdLife International Gastañaga in her 2011 study is said to have estimated the population to be 400. This is not actually stated in her report, instead it is estimated that outside of breeding season the birds occur at a density of less than one bird per 1 km^{2} (0.39 sq mi) over an area encompassing at least the four known areas of occurrence, within 30 km (19 mi) of each other (thus a minimum of 900 km^{2} (347 sq mi), thus maximum of 900 birds). (Note: It is unclear if Graham's specimen and sightings in 2007 on the other side of the mountain range were included, however, these were only 20 km (12 mi) from the first sightings.) The 2016 IUCN assessment estimates that the extent of occurrence is 550 km^{2} (212 sq mi) (apparently all within the 6,164 km^{2} (2,380 sq mi) El Sira Communal Reserve), although it is unclear where this number comes from.

Because of the difference between the stated populations in 2011 and 2014, the 2016 IUCN assessment assumes the population is experiencing a 'decreasing trend'.

According to BirdLife International, the greatest threat to the species is occasional traditional hunting by the local Asháninka people.
