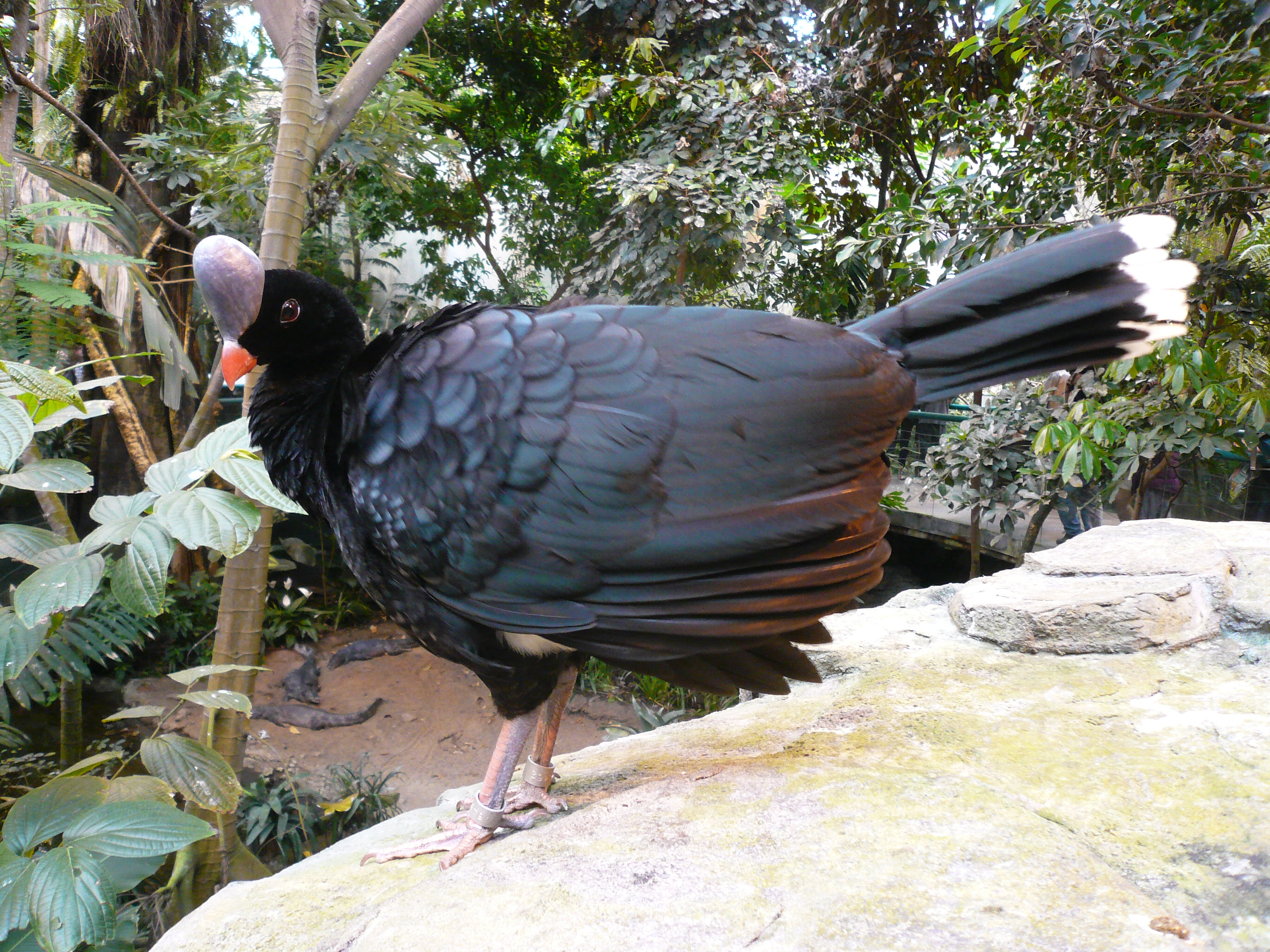
- Helmeted curassow, Pauxi pauxi

Scientific classification
- Kingdom: Animalia
- Phylum: Chordata
- Class: Aves
- Order: Galliformes
- Family: Cracidae
- Subfamily: Cracinae
- Genus: Pauxi; Temminck, 1813

Type species
- Crax pauxi Linnaeus, 1766

Species
- 3, see text

= Pauxi =

Genus of birds

The genus Pauxi consists of the three species of helmeted curassows, terrestrial black fowl with ornamental casque on their heads. All are found in South America.

This genus contains 3 species

Image	Scientific name	Common name	Distribution
	Pauxi pauxi	Helmeted curassow or northern helmeted curassow	eastern Andes of Venezuela and Colombia
	Pauxi unicornis	Horned curassow or southern helmeted curassow	Bolivia
	Pauxi koepckeae	Sira curassow	Cerros del Sira in central Peru

As indicated by analysis of mt and nDNA sequences and calibrated with geological data, this genus' ancestors probably diverged from those of Mitu, their closest living relatives, in the Tortonian (early Late Miocene), some 8–7.4 mya. How the present distribution in 4 small areas quite distant from each other came to be is not known. Given that helmeted curassows are birds of the foothills and uplands, it might be that the ancestral Pauxi population became fragmented by the uplift of the Andes, which in their area of distribution took place during the Late Miocene, around the Pauxi-Mitu divergence and some time after.(Pereira & Baker 2002, Pereira et al. 2002).

Pereira & Baker (2002) reported an interesting find: in the mtDNA phylogeny, Pauxi was paraphyletic, with P. unicornis being resolved as the sister species of Mitu tuberosa. This, of course, does not automatically imply that they are closely related or that the genera are invalid. Rather, the authors point out, given the distinct and peculiar morphology of the two genera, incomplete lineage sorting or hybridization between ancestral individuals of the two species is a more likely explanation. According to their data, there must have been some extent of gene flow between Mitu tuberosa and P. unicornis around 2 mya. Unfortunately, the authors do not provide subspecific identification of their single P. unicornis specimen. In any case, they took care to exclude captive hybridization in their choice of samples, as it is frequently known to occur in curassows and would have confounded the analysis. Altogether, what can be said with certainty is that there seems to have been some extent of hybridization between at least one population of the southern helmeted curassow and female razor-billed curassows at the end of the Pliocene.
