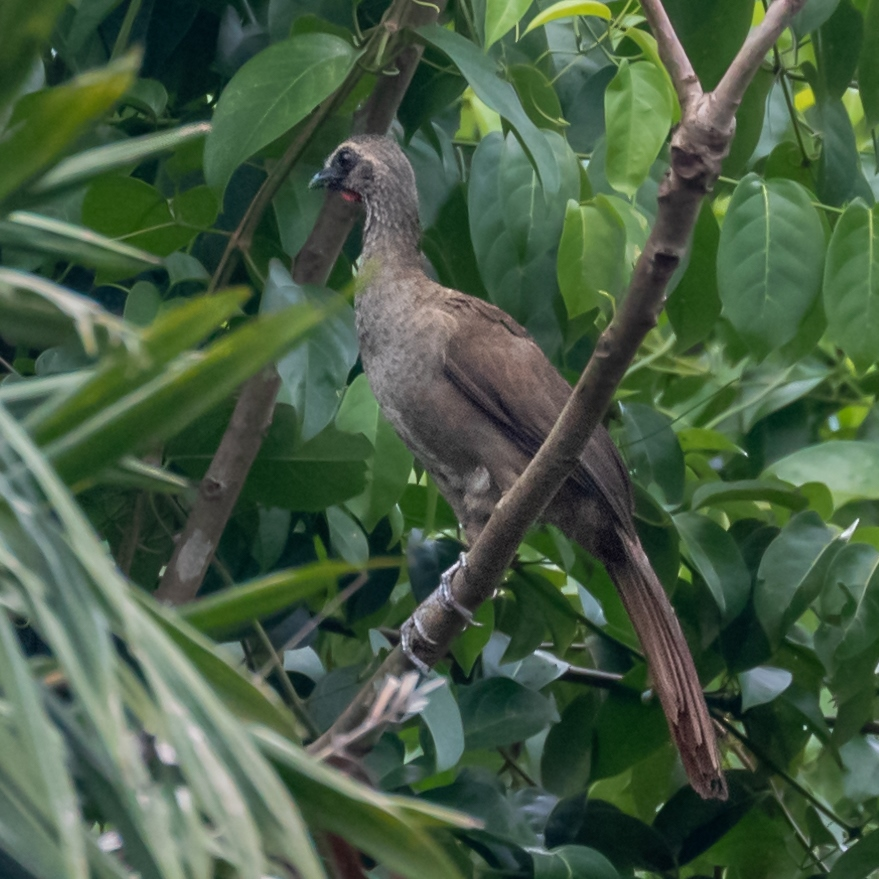

Conservation status
- Least Concern (IUCN 3.1)

Scientific classification
- Kingdom: Animalia
- Phylum: Chordata
- Class: Aves
- Order: Galliformes
- Family: Cracidae
- Genus: Ortalis
- Species: O. superciliaris

Binomial name
- Ortalis superciliaris Gray, GR, 1867
- Distribution of the buff-browed chachalaca

Synonyms
- Ortalis spixi

= Buff-browed chachalaca =

Species of bird

The buff-browed chachalaca (Ortalis superciliaris) is a species of bird in the family Cracidae, the chachalacas, guans, and curassows. It is endemic to Brazil.

== Taxonomy and systematics ==
What is now the buff-browed chachalaca was previously a subspecies of what was then called variable chachalaca (Ortalis motmot). (Confusingly, after the split the International Ornithological Committee (IOC) renamed O. motmot "little chachalaca" but the American Ornithological Society (AOS) and the Clements taxonomy retained the name "variable" for it.) It is monotypic.

== Description ==
The buff-browed chachalaca is the smallest member of genus Ortalis. It is 42 to 46 cm (1.4 to 1.5 ft) long. Its crown, neck, and upper breast are gray and the rest of its upperparts brown. Its lower breast and belly are tan. The central tail feathers are dark green-brown with chestnut tips; the outer ones are chestnut. Unique among Ortalis, it has a prominent supercilium that can be any color from buffy white to pale cinnamon. Its facial skin is dark slate gray.

== Distribution and habitat ==
The buff-browed chachalaca is found in northeastern Brazil south of the Amazon River in parts of the states of Pará, Maranhão, Ceará, Tocantins, and Piauí. It is a bird of the lowlands, inhabiting scrublands and forest thickets including those in heavily degraded areas.

== Behavior ==
=== Feeding ===
No formal study of the buff-browed chachalaca's diet has been published, but it has been observed eating palm fruits and some flowers.

=== Breeding ===
A study of the buff-browed chachalaca's breeding phenology in Pará found a nesting season between December and February, but active nests have been found in other months as well. One described nest was a flat structure of twigs with leaves and grasses. Nests have been found in a tree fork, on top of tall grass, and in dense bushes. The typical clutch size is two or three eggs.

=== Vocalization ===
The buff-browed chachalaca's vocalizations are "typical of Ortalis"; they are higher pitched and less raucous than those of chestnut-headed chachalaca (O. ruficeps).

== Status ==
The IUCN originally assessed the buff-browed chachalaca as Near Threatened but since 2012 has rated it as being of Least Concern. "Threats [are] listed as habitat destruction and fragmentation, heavy hunting pressure and trade, all of which suggest that it is declining."
