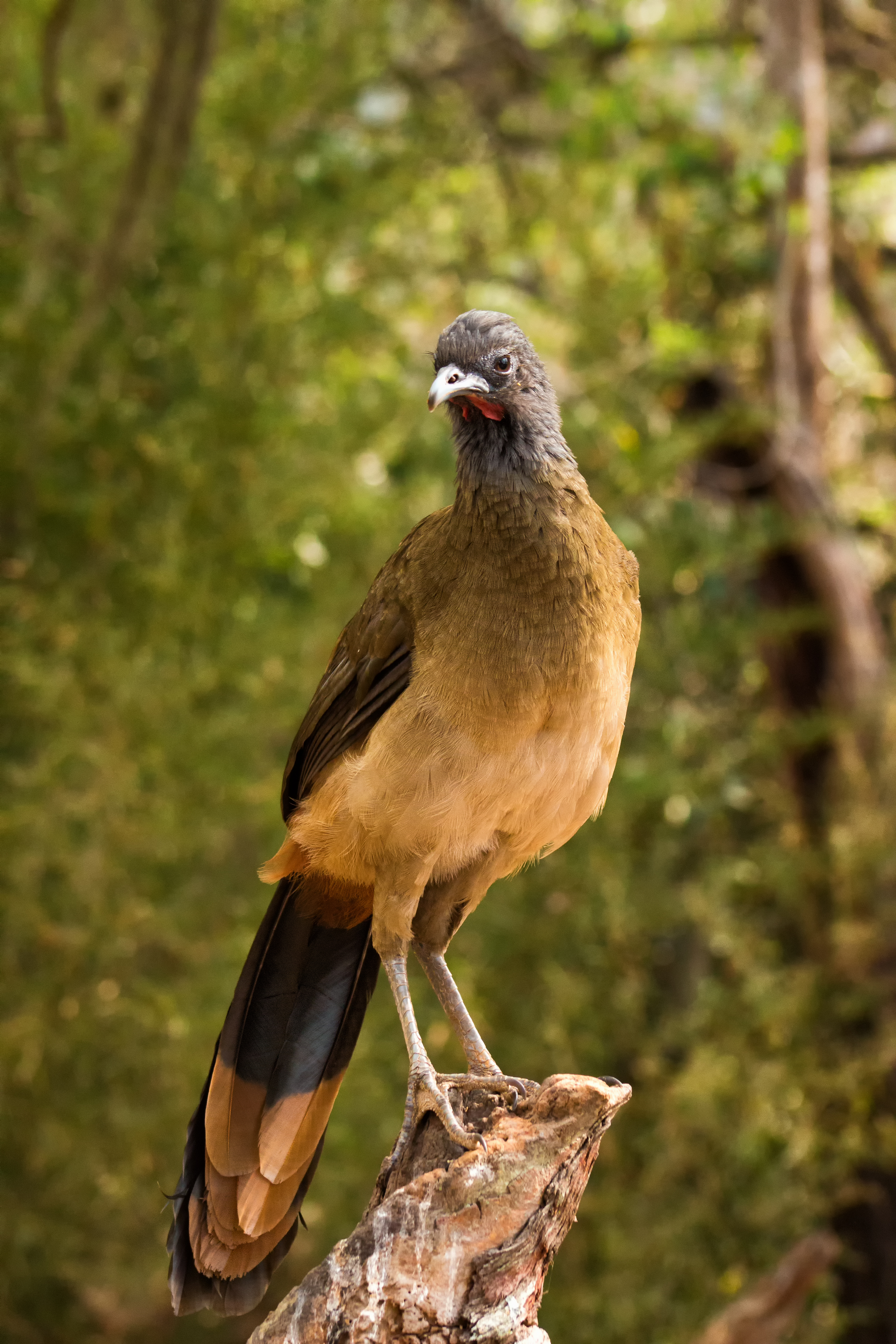
- Rufous-vented chachalaca, Ortalis ruficauda

Scientific classification
- Kingdom: Animalia
- Phylum: Chordata
- Class: Aves
- Order: Galliformes
- Family: Cracidae
- Subfamily: Cracinae
- Genus: Ortalis; Merrem, 1786

Type species
- Phasianus motmot Linnaeus, 1766

Species
- 16, see text.

= Chachalaca =

Genus of birds

Chachalacas are galliform birds from the genus Ortalis. These birds are found in wooded habitats in the far southern United States (Texas), Mexico, and Central and South America. They are social, can be very noisy and often remain fairly common even near humans, as their relatively small size makes them less desirable to hunters than their larger relatives. As agricultural pests, they have a ravenous appetite for tomatoes, melons, beans, and radishes and can ravage a small garden in short order. They travel in packs of six to twelve. Their nests are made of sticks, twigs, leaves, or moss and are generally frail, flat structures only a few feet above the ground. During April, they lay from three to five buffy white eggs, the shell of which is very rough and hard. They somewhat resemble the guans, and the two have commonly been placed in a subfamily together, though the chachalacas are probably closer to the curassows.

== Taxonomy ==
The genus Ortalis was introduced (as Ortalida) by the German naturalist Blasius Merrem in 1786 with the little chachalaca (Ortalis motmot) as the type species. The generic name is derived from the Ancient Greek word όρταλις, meaning "pullet" or "domestic hen." The common name derives from the Nahuatl verb chachalaca, meaning "to chatter." With a glottal stop at the end, chachalacah was an alternate name for the bird known as the chachalahtli. All these words likely arose as an onomatopoeia for the four-noted cackle of the plain chachalaca (O. vetula). The genus contains 16 species.

Mitochondrial and nuclear DNA sequence data tentatively suggest that the chachalacas emerged as a distinct lineage during the Oligocene, somewhere around 40–20 mya, possibly being the first lineage of modern cracids to evolve; this does agree with the known fossil record – including indeterminate, cracid-like birds – which very cautiously favors a north-to-south expansion of the family.

== Species ==
Image	Common name	Scientific name	Distribution
	Plain chachalaca	Ortalis vetula	Southern Texas, Mexico, the Yucatán Peninsula, Belize, northern Guatemala, northern Honduras and just into the north central part of Nicaragua
	Grey-headed chachalaca	Ortalis cinereiceps	eastern Honduras to northwestern Colombia (from South Chocó to the upper Atrato), Costa Rica
	Chestnut-winged chachalaca	Ortalis garrula	Colombia
	Rufous-vented chachalaca	Ortalis ruficauda	northeast Colombia and Venezuela, Tobago, Saint Vincent and the Grenadines, Grenada
	Rufous-headed chachalaca	Ortalis erythroptera	Colombia and adjacent Ecuador and Peru
	Rufous-bellied chachalaca	Ortalis wagleri	Mexico
	West Mexican chachalaca	Ortalis poliocephala	Mexico, from Jalisco to Oaxaca
	Chaco chachalaca	Ortalis canicollis	Argentina, Bolivia, Brazil, Paraguay, and Uruguay
	White-bellied chachalaca	Ortalis leucogastra	Costa Rica, El Salvador, Guatemala, Honduras, Mexico, and Nicaragua
	Colombian chachalaca	Ortalis columbiana	Colombia
	Speckled chachalaca	Ortalis guttata	western Amazon Basin
	East Brazilian chachalaca	Ortalis araucuan	Atlantic forests in eastern Brazil
	Scaled chachalaca	Ortalis squamata	southeastern Brazil
	Little chachalaca	Ortalis motmot	northern Brazil, French Guiana, Suriname, Guyana and Venezuela
	Chestnut-headed chachalaca	Ortalis ruficeps	north central Brazil
	Buff-browed chachalaca	Ortalis superciliaris	Brazil

=== Prehistoric species ===
The cracids have a very poor fossil record, essentially being limited to a few chachalacas. The prehistoric species of the present genus, however, indicate that chachalacas most likely evolved in North or northern Central America:

- Ortalis tantala Wetmore 1933 (Early Miocene of Nebraska, USA)
- Ortalis pollicaris Miller 1944 (Flint Hill Middle Miocene of South Dakota, USA)
- Ortalis affinis Feduccia & Willis 1967 (Ogallala Early Pliocene of Trego County, Kansas, USA)
- Ortalis phengites Wetmore 1923 (Snake Creek Early Pliocene of Sioux County, Nebraska, USA)

The Early Miocene fossil Boreortalis from Florida is also a chachalaca; it may actually be referrable to the extant genus.
