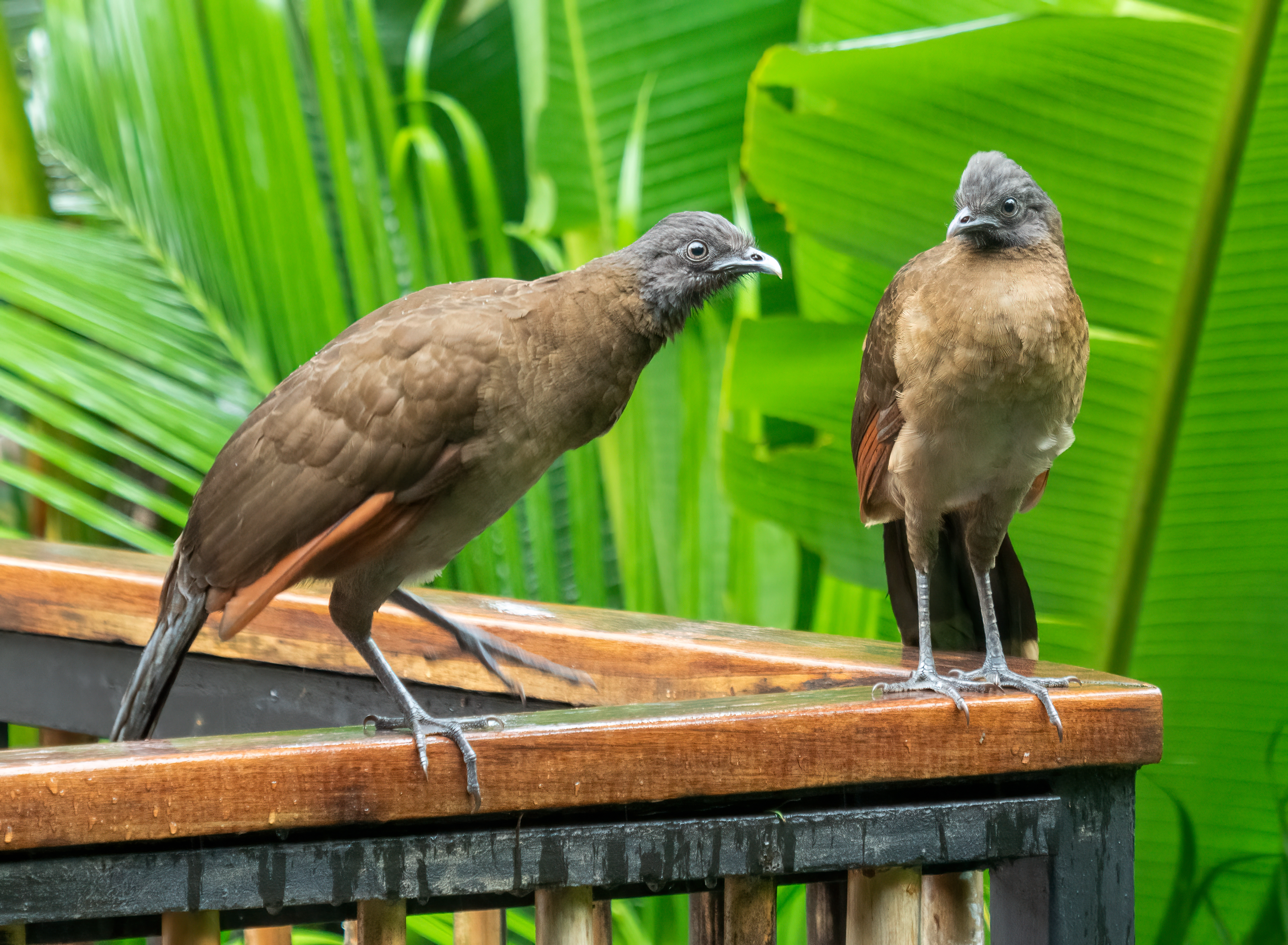
- In La Fortuna, Costa Rica

Conservation status
- Least Concern (IUCN 3.1)

Scientific classification
- Kingdom: Animalia
- Phylum: Chordata
- Class: Aves
- Order: Galliformes
- Family: Cracidae
- Genus: Ortalis
- Species: O. cinereiceps

Binomial name
- Ortalis cinereiceps Gray, GR, 1867

= Grey-headed chachalaca =

Species of bird

The grey-headed chachalaca (Ortalis cinereiceps) is a member of an ancient group of birds in the family Cracidae, which includes chachalacas, guans, and curassows. It is found from Honduras to Colombia.

== Taxonomy and systematics ==
The family Cracidae is closely related to the guineafowl (Numididae), the pheasants, grouse and allies (Phasianidae), and the New World quail (Odontophoridae). The grey-headed chachalaca was at one time treated as conspecific with the chestnut-winged chachalaca (Ortalis garrula). It is monotypic; several subspecies have been proposed and not accepted.

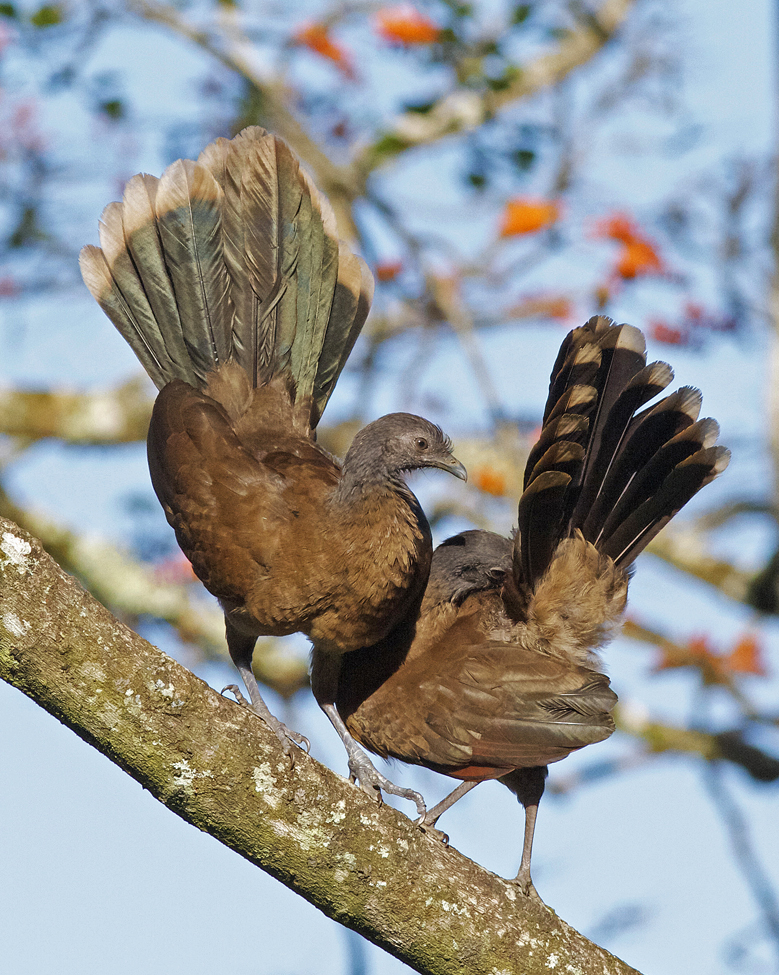
Gray-headed chachalacas displaying (Costa Rica)

== Description ==
The grey-headed chachalaca is a medium-sized bird, similar in general appearance to turkeys, with a small head, long strong legs, and a long broad tail. They are 48 to 58 cm (1.6 to 1.9 ft) long and weigh 490 to 540 g (1.1 to 1.2 lb). They have fairly dull plumage, grayish brown above and paler below. The head is dark grey with a red dewlap and the blackish tail is tipped with buff. Their primary flight feathers are bright chestnut. Juveniles are browner overall, especially on the head.

== Distribution and habitat ==
The grey-headed chachalaca is found from Mosquitia in eastern Honduras through eastern Nicaragua and most of Costa Rica and Panama into Colombia's Chocó Department. In addition to mainland Panama it occurs on Isla del Rey, where it might have been introduced by Native Americans. It inhabits a variety of humid landscapes characterized by dense vegetation such as thickets, secondary forest, brushy abandoned fields, and thinned forests. It shuns the interior of dense forest though it can occur in their edges. In elevation it ranges from sea level to 1,700 m (5,600 ft).

== Behavior ==
=== Feeding ===
The grey-headed chachalaca forages typically in groups of six to 12 but sometimes up to 20, usually in the vegetation but sometimes on the ground. Its diet is about 75% fruit, 17% leaves, and 8% invertebrates. In the dry season it visits rivers to drink in the morning and evening.

=== Breeding ===
The grey-headed chachalaca's egg-laying season spans at least January to May, which overlaps the dry season. Its broad shallow nest is built of twigs, vines, and other vegetation and placed 1 to 2.4 m (3 to 8 ft) above ground in a tree or bush and often screened by vines. The female lays three dull white eggs and incubates them alone.

=== Vocalization ===
The grey-headed chachalaca is less noisy than plain (O. vetula) or rufous-vented chachalacas (O. ruficauda). Its song is a soft "cha-cha-lac-ah". Flocks give raucous calls described as "kloik, kleeuk kraahk". It also makes a variety of screams, sharp alarm calls, and a quiet purr.

== Status ==
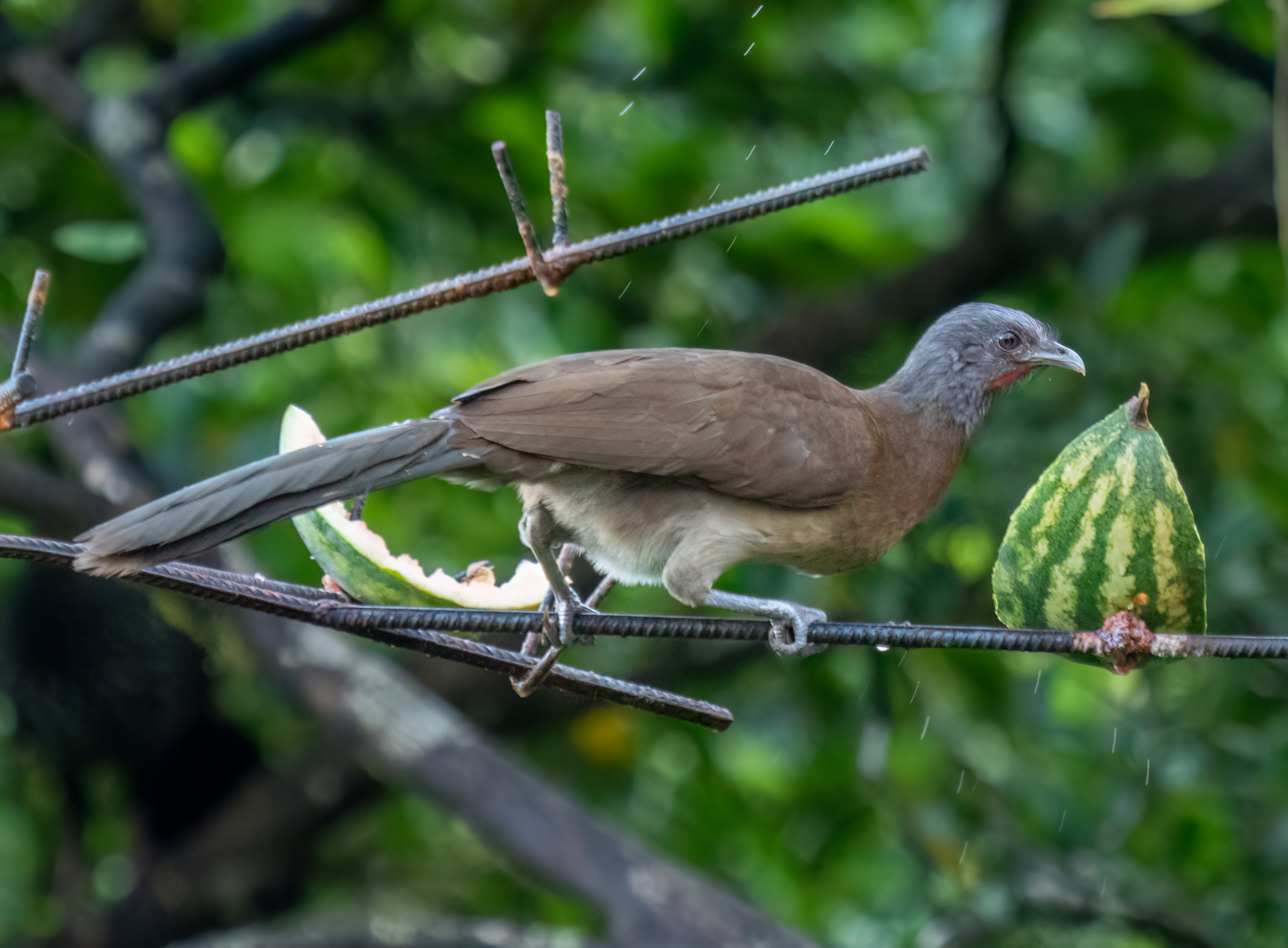
At a feeder at the Arenal Observatory

The IUCN has assessed the grey-headed chachalaca as being of Least Concern. It varies from fairly common to common throughout its range though in some areas the population has been significantly reduced by hunting. It adapts well to some habitat disturbance.

== Other reading ==
- Stiles, F. Gary; Skutch, Alexander F. (1989). A Guide to the Birds of Costa Rica. Comstock Publishing Associates. ISBN 0-8014-9600-4.
