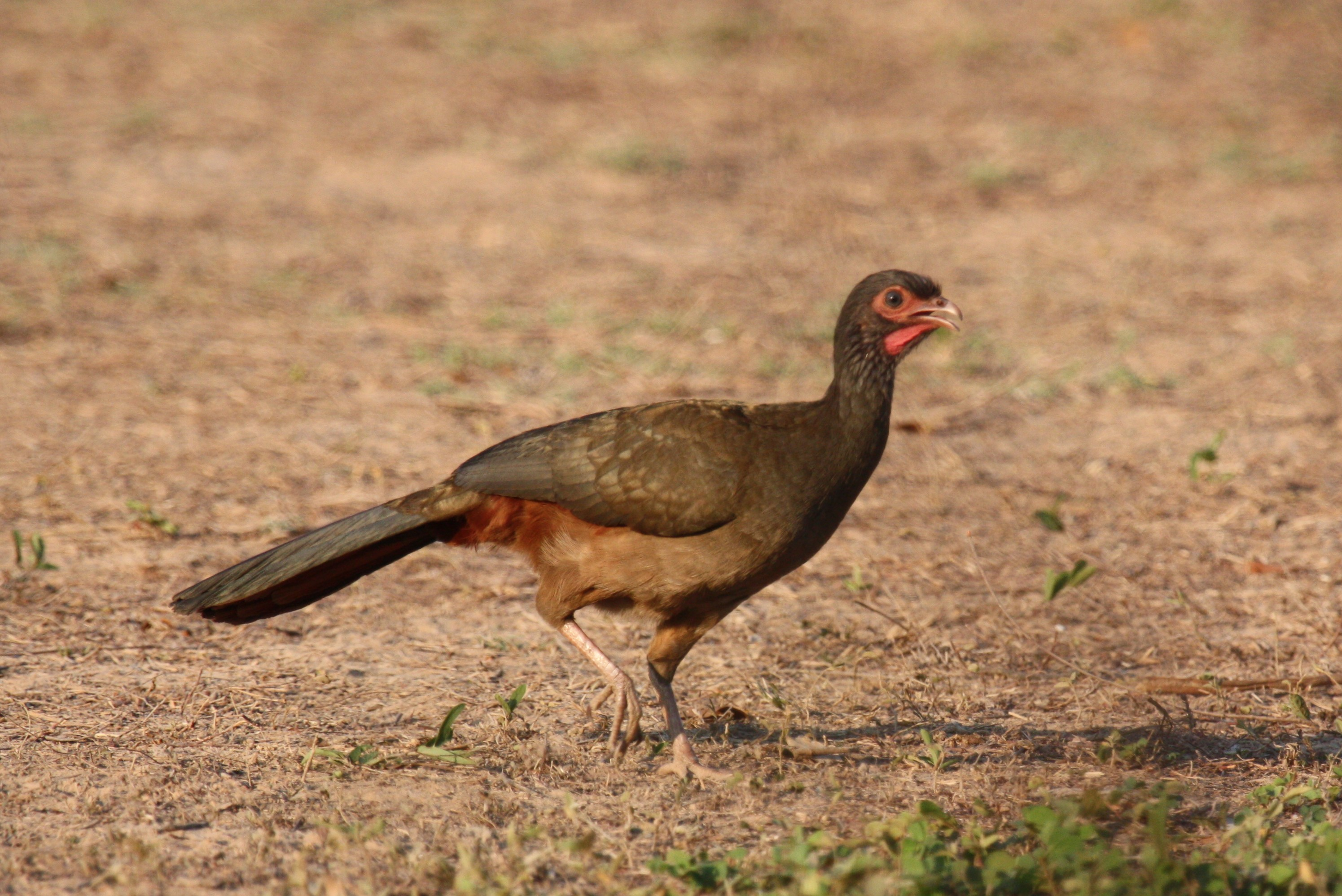
- In the Pantanal, Brazil.

Conservation status
- Least Concern (IUCN 3.1)

Scientific classification
- Kingdom: Animalia
- Phylum: Chordata
- Class: Aves
- Order: Galliformes
- Family: Cracidae
- Genus: Ortalis
- Species: O. canicollis

Binomial name
- Ortalis canicollis (Wagler, 1830)

= Chaco chachalaca =

Species of bird

The Chaco chachalaca (Ortalis canicollis) is a species of bird in the family Cracidae, the chachalacas, guans, and curassows. It is found in Argentina, Bolivia, Brazil, Paraguay, and possibly Uruguay.

== Taxonomy and systematics ==
The Chaco chachalaca has two recognized subspecies, the nominate Ortalis canicollis canicollis (Wagler, 1830) and O. c. pantanalensis (Cherrie and Reichenberger, 1921). The latter might actually be a subspecies of plain chachalaca (O. vetula) or a species in its own right. The Paraguayan population has been treated as a separate subspecies but that status has not been generally accepted.

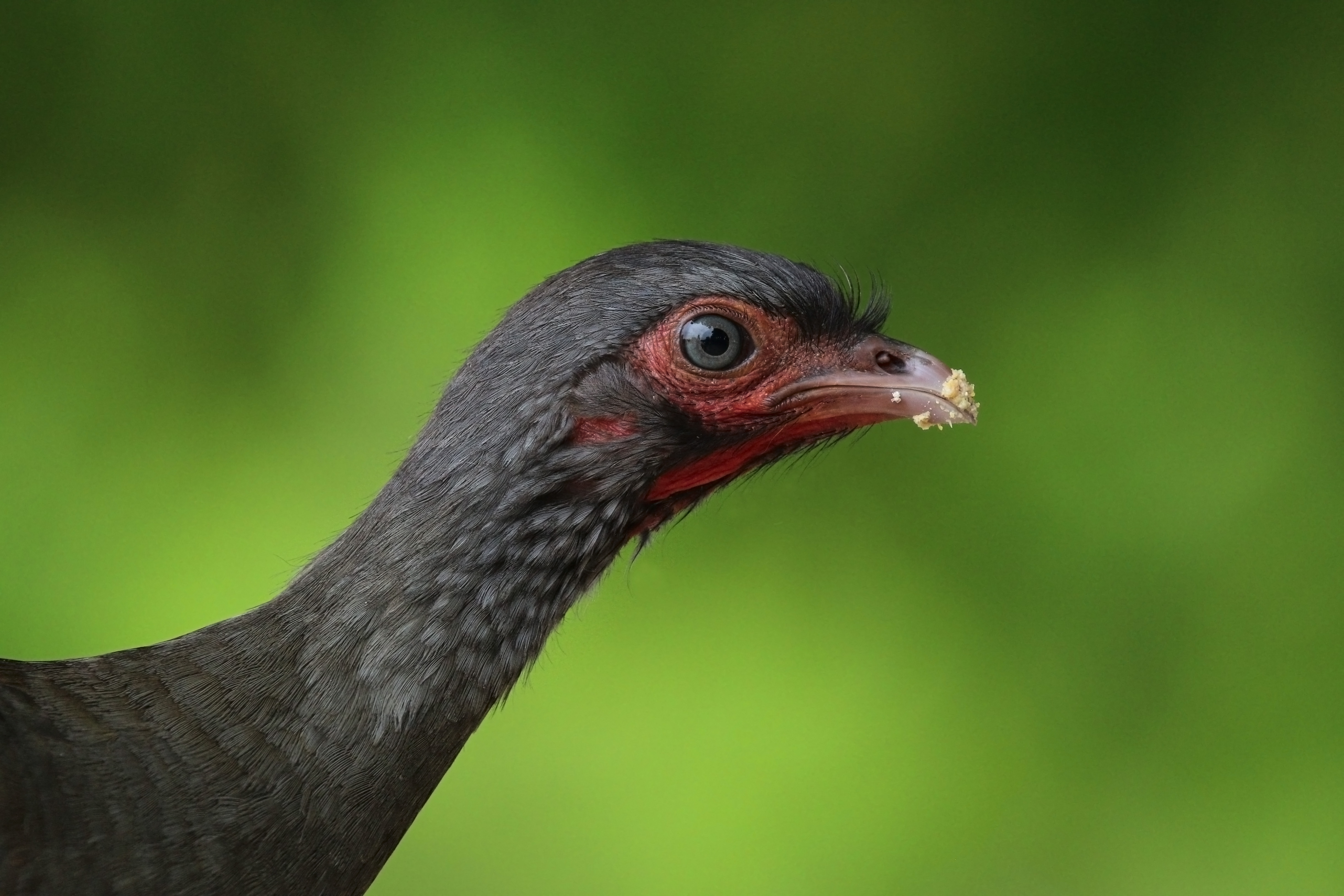
O. c. pantanalensis

== Description ==
The Chaco chachalaca is 50 to 56 cm (1.6 to 1.8 ft) long and weighs 479 to 678 g (1.1 to 1.5 lb). The nominate subspecies' head, back, and breast are gray and the belly tan to brown. It has bare pinkish red skin around the eye. O. c. pantanalensis is browner and the facial skin is more purplish than pinkish.

== Distribution and habitat ==
The nominate subspecies of Chaco chachalaca is found in the Gran Chaco of eastern Bolivia, western Paraguay, and northern Argentina. O. c. pantanalensis is found in southwestern Mato Grosso and Mato Grosso do Sul of Brazil. There are also unconfirmed reports of it in neighboring Bolivia and Paraguay. The South American Classification Committee of the American Ornithological Society considers the species to be hypothetical in Uruguay.

The Chaco chachalaca inhabits a variety of landscapes including lowland swamp forest and scrub, dry subtropical forest, semi-deciduous and gallery forest, and palm groves. It can be found in both mature and secondary forest. In Brazil and Paraguay it is found only at low elevations but can be found as high as about 1,000 m (3,300 ft) in Argentina.

== Behavior ==
=== Feeding ===
In forest landscapes, the Chaco chachalaca usually forages in small groups though as many as 30 have been observed. It usually feeds in the crown of trees but in areas with little undergrowth will also feed on the ground. In Argentina groups of up to 150 have been observed feeding in agricultural land far from cover. Its diet is primarily fruits and leaves year round and it adds invertebrates, especially caterpillars, when they are seasonally abundant.

=== Breeding ===
The Chaco chachalaca's breeding season in Argentina spans from October to February and apparently begins as early as August in Bolivia. The nest is a small loose platform of sticks and stems that is sometimes lined with leaves. It is placed in a dense bush or tree, usually between 2.5 and 4 m (8.2 and 13 ft) above the ground. The clutch size is two to four eggs that the female alone incubates.

=== Vocalization ===
The Chaco chachalaca's principal vocalization is given in the early morning, a "harsh, raucous 'chata-ra-ta'...or 'bink, ka chee chaw raw taw, chaw raw taw, chaw raw taw'." It has several other vocalizations described as an "insistent "prep-ep-ep-ep", an ascending and somewhat querulous 'preeeeew-it', a 'chack' in alarm and a low-pitched upslurred whistle 'WOOoooooiiK' in warning; also dog-like yelping".

== Status ==
The IUCN has assessed the Chaco chachalaca as being of Least Concern. It is generally common throughout its range but in some areas is subject to heavy hunting pressure.
