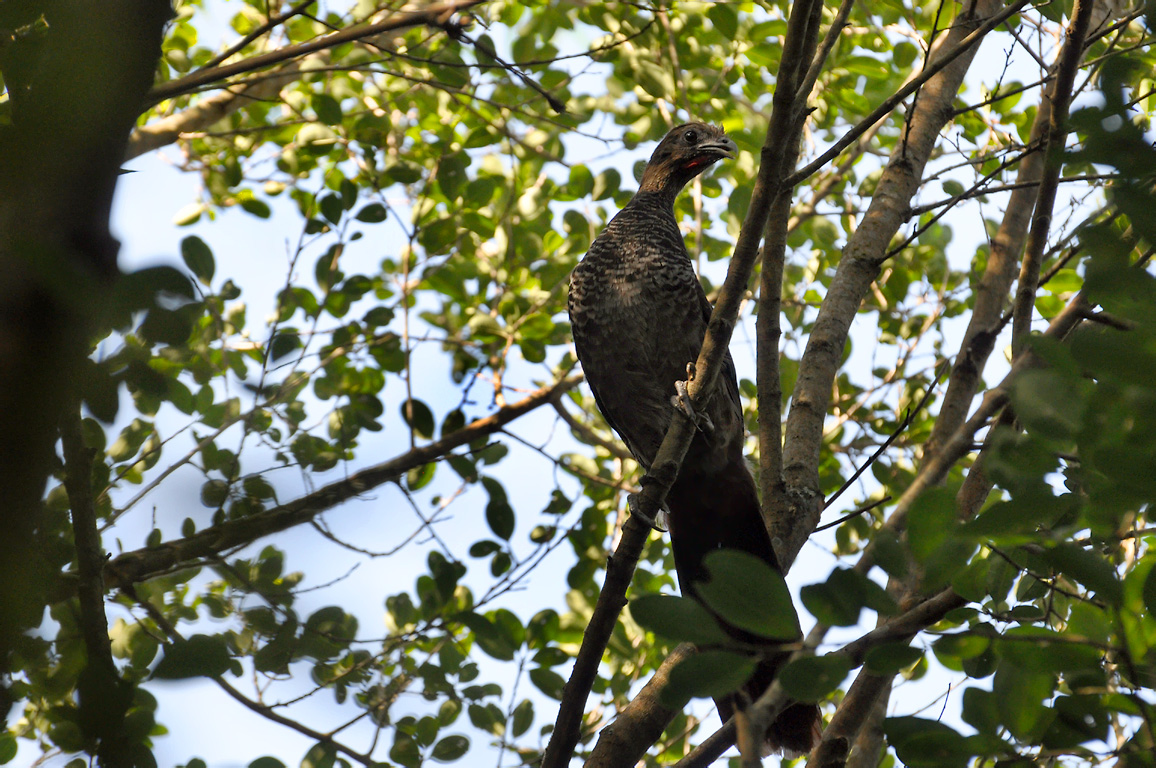
- In Pelotas, Rio Grande do Sul, Brazil

Conservation status
- Least Concern (IUCN 3.1)

Scientific classification
- Kingdom: Animalia
- Phylum: Chordata
- Class: Aves
- Order: Galliformes
- Family: Cracidae
- Genus: Ortalis
- Species: O. squamata

Binomial name
- Ortalis squamata Lesson, 1829

= Scaled chachalaca =

Species of bird

The scaled chachalaca (Ortalis squamata) is a species of bird in the family Cracidae, the chachalacas, guans, and curassows. It is endemic to Brazil.

== Taxonomy and systematics ==
The scaled chachalaca was previously considered a subspecies of the speckled chachalaca (Ortalis guttata). Before that it was treated as a subspecies of plain chachalaca (O. vetula) or what was then called variable chachalaca (O. motmot). The remota subspecies of speckled chachalaca has been proposed as actually belonging to the scaled chachalaca but that treatment has not been accepted. As currently understood, the scaled chachalaca is monotypic.

== Description ==
The scaled chachalaca is about 50 cm (1.6 ft) long. One male weighed about 620 g (1.4 lb) and a female 498 g (1.1 lb). Its plumage is mostly shades of brown, darker on the upperside. The breast is also dark brown with pale feather edges that give a scalloped or scaly effect. The belly is buffy and the vent chestnut. It has a small pinkish throat patch. The bare skin around the dark eye is slate gray.

== Distribution and habitat ==
The scaled chachalaca is endemic to southeastern Brazil from southern São Paulo through Paraná and Santa Catarina into Rio Grande do Sul. It might also have occurred in southeastern Paraguay through the late 1800s. It inhabits the edges of tropical evergreen forest and the interior and edges of restinga and Laguncularia racemosa-dominated mangrove stands. In elevation it ranges from sea level to 800 m (2,600 ft).

== Behavior ==
=== Feeding ===
The scaled chachalaca is usually seen in small family groups. Its diet is mostly fruits and leaves but it also visits feeding stations with bananas and suburban gardens.

=== Breeding ===
The scaled chachalaca's breeding season appears to span from October to February or March based on the dates of sightings of adults in breeding condition, eggs, and young. Its nest is a shallow bowl of twigs and leaves, typically placed in a concealed fork of a tree up to about 3 m (10 ft) above ground. The clutch size is three eggs.

=== Vocalization ===
The scaled chachalaca's song is "a raucous, very noisy but highly variable 'racket', given in duet or chorus from multiple individuals, cacataPOOP, cacataPOP, cacataWHUMP, cacataWEEcata on [one] pitch." It also makes "an irregular but sometimes rhythmic cackling or throaty bubbling, cuhcuh-cuhCAHcuhcuhcucCAH cuhcuhcuhcuh...."

== Status ==
The IUCN has assessed the scaled chachalaca as being of Least Concern. Though its population has not been quantified, it is at least locally common in several parts of its range. It does face hunting pressure and loss of habitat from deforestation.
