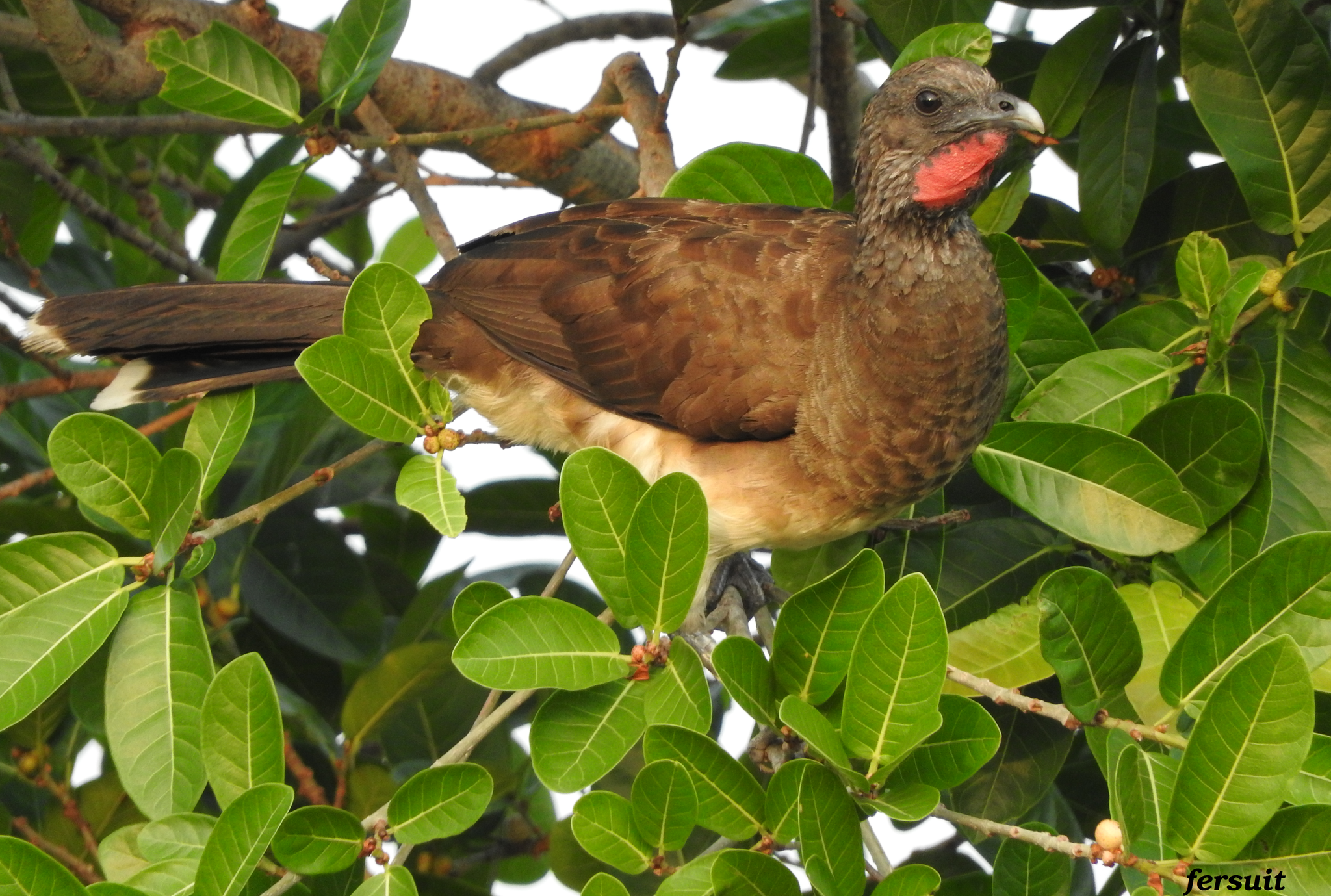

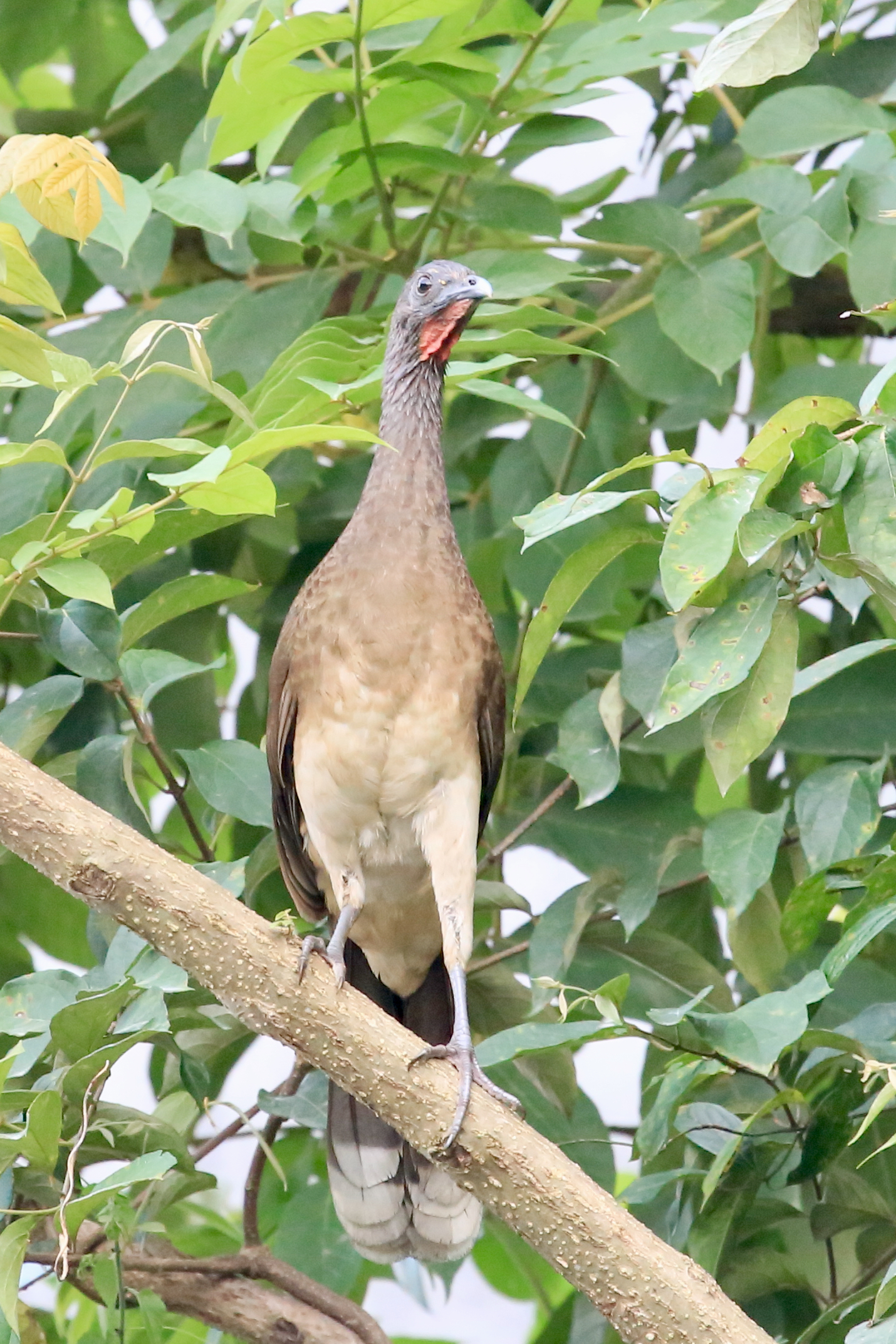

Conservation status
- Least Concern (IUCN 3.1)

Scientific classification
- Kingdom: Animalia
- Phylum: Chordata
- Class: Aves
- Order: Galliformes
- Family: Cracidae
- Genus: Ortalis
- Species: O. leucogastra

Binomial name
- Ortalis leucogastra (Gould, 1843)

= White-bellied chachalaca =

Species of bird

The white-bellied chachalaca (Ortalis leucogastra) is a species of bird in the family Cracidae, the chachalacas, guans, and curassows. It is found in El Salvador, Guatemala, Honduras, Mexico, and Nicaragua.

== Taxonomy and systematics ==
The white-bellied chachalaca was at one time considered a subspecies of plain chachalaca (Ortalis vetula). It is believed to be most closely related to the speckled chachalaca (O. guttata). It is monotypic.

== Description ==
The white-bellied chachalaca is 43 to 50 cm (1.4 to 1.6 ft) long and weighs 439 to 560 g (0.97 to 1.2 lb). Its head, upperparts, and breast are brown and the belly dull white. Its brown tail is tipped with white. Bare dark slate facial skin surrounds the eye.

== Distribution and habitat ==
The white-bellied chachalaca is found from southeastern Chiapas in extreme southwestern Mexico through southern Guatemala, El Salvador, and southern Honduras into northwestern Nicaragua. It primarily inhabits swamp forest and swamps with thick scrub and is also found in dry forest, pasture edges, and mangroves. It is most common on the Pacific coastal plain but in Guatemala ranges as high as about 1,500 m (4,900 ft).

== Behavior ==
=== Feeding ===
The white-bellied chachalaca forages in groups of six and sometimes more birds, and almost always stays 6 to 10 m (20 to 33 ft) up in vegetation. Its diet is primarily berries and fruits, and it also feeds on leaves, buds, flowers, and invertebrates.

=== Breeding ===
Egg laying by the white-bellied chachalaca has been recorded in every month from March to July. Its nest is a small loose platform of sticks lined with leaves. It is placed in a tree, usually between 5 and 20 m (16 and 66 ft) high. The clutch size is two or three eggs that only the female incubates.

=== Vocalization ===
The white-bellied chachalaca's principal vocalization is "a gruff, burry chattering of four syllables 'k-ku’uh-uh' or 'ch-k-uh-urr'."

== Status ==
The IUCN has assessed the white-bellied chachalaca as being of Least Concern. It is "common to locally abundant" in much of its range though uncommon in Honduras and Nicaragua. It seems to have benefitted somewhat by the conversion of dense forest to shade coffee, but elsewhere has lost habitat to pastures and field crops. It is hunted for food.
