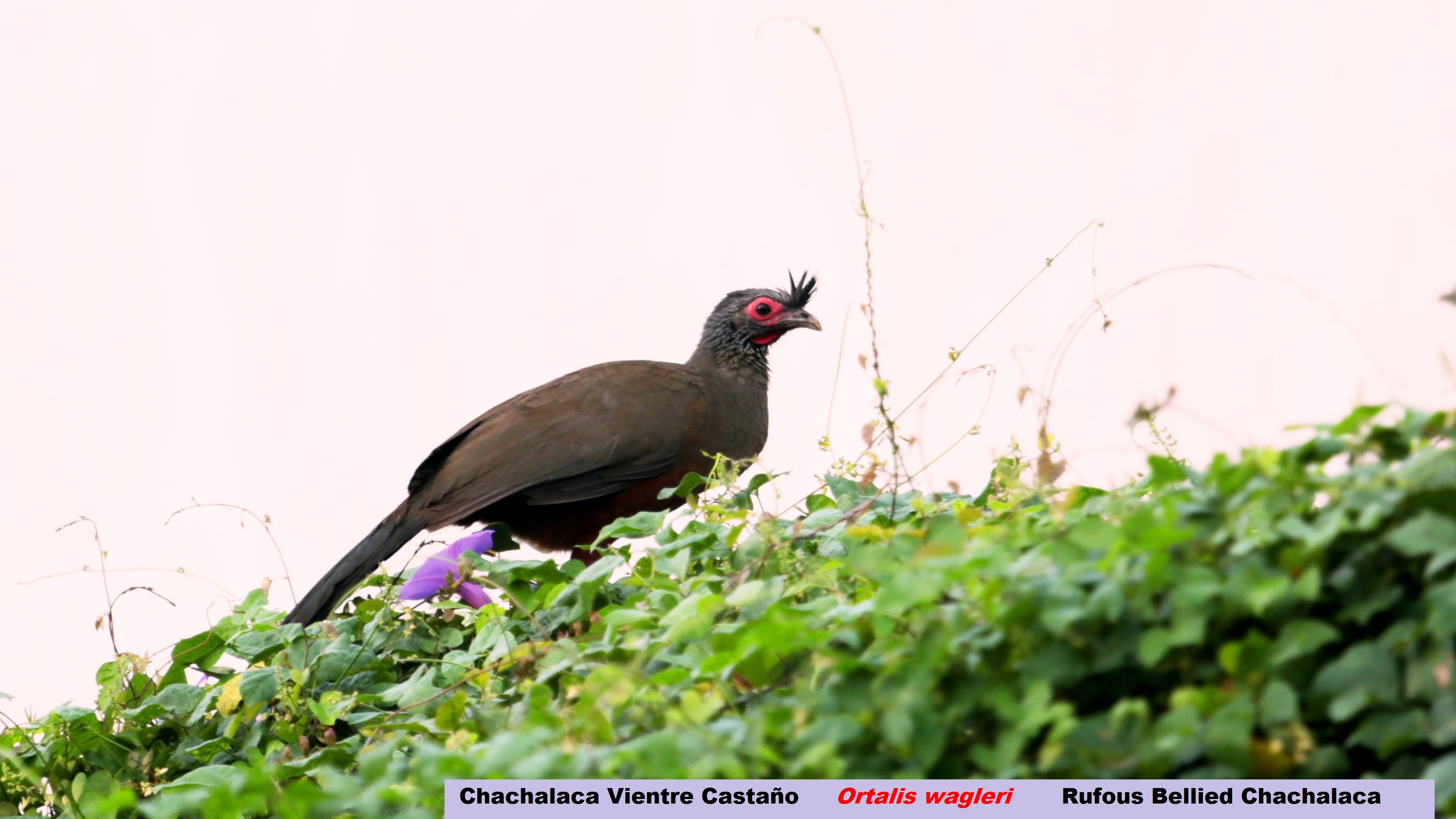

Conservation status
- Least Concern (IUCN 3.1)

Scientific classification
- Domain: Eukaryota
- Kingdom: Animalia
- Phylum: Chordata
- Class: Aves
- Order: Galliformes
- Family: Cracidae
- Genus: Ortalis
- Species: O. wagleri

Binomial name
- Ortalis wagleri Gray, GR, 1867

= Rufous-bellied chachalaca =

Species of bird

The rufous-bellied chachalaca (Ortalis wagleri) is a species of bird in the family Cracidae, the chachalacas, guans, and curassows. It is endemic to western Mexico.

== Taxonomy and systematics ==
The rufous-bellied chachalaca was at one time considered a subspecies of the West Mexican chachalaca (Ortalis poliocephala). It is monotypic, though the Sonoran population has been treated as a subspecies.

== Description ==
The rufous-bellied chachalaca is 62 to 67 cm (2.0 to 2.2 ft) long and weighs about 834 g (1.8 lb). Most of its plumage is gray brown to olive brown, but its chestnut belly and tail tips make it the most richly colored member of its genus. It has bare pink and blue skin around the eye.

== Distribution and habitat ==
The rufous-bellied chachalaca is found in western Mexico from southern Sonora south to northwestern Jalisco. It inhabits tropical deciduous, semi-deciduous, and thorn forest and, along the coast, mangroves. In elevation it usually ranges from sea level to 1,300 m (4,300 ft) but has been found as high as 2,000 m (6,600 ft).

== Behavior ==
=== Feeding ===
The rufous-bellied chachalaca forages in groups of up to 10, gleaning fruit from trees.

=== Breeding ===
Little is known about the rufous-bellied chachalaca's breeding phenology. Its breeding season appears to center around June. The clutch size is usually three eggs.

=== Vocalization ===
The rufous-bellied chachalaca's principal vocalization is a " loud, rhythmic, 4–5-syllable, chorus 'kirr-i-i-kr', 'chrr-i-k-rr' or 'chrr-uh-uh-rr' to which is sometimes added "loud cackling, whistling, or growling notes."

== Status ==
The IUCN has assessed the rufous-bellied chachalaca as being of Least Concern. It is fairly common to common, even in habitats severely altered by humans, and is legally hunted.
