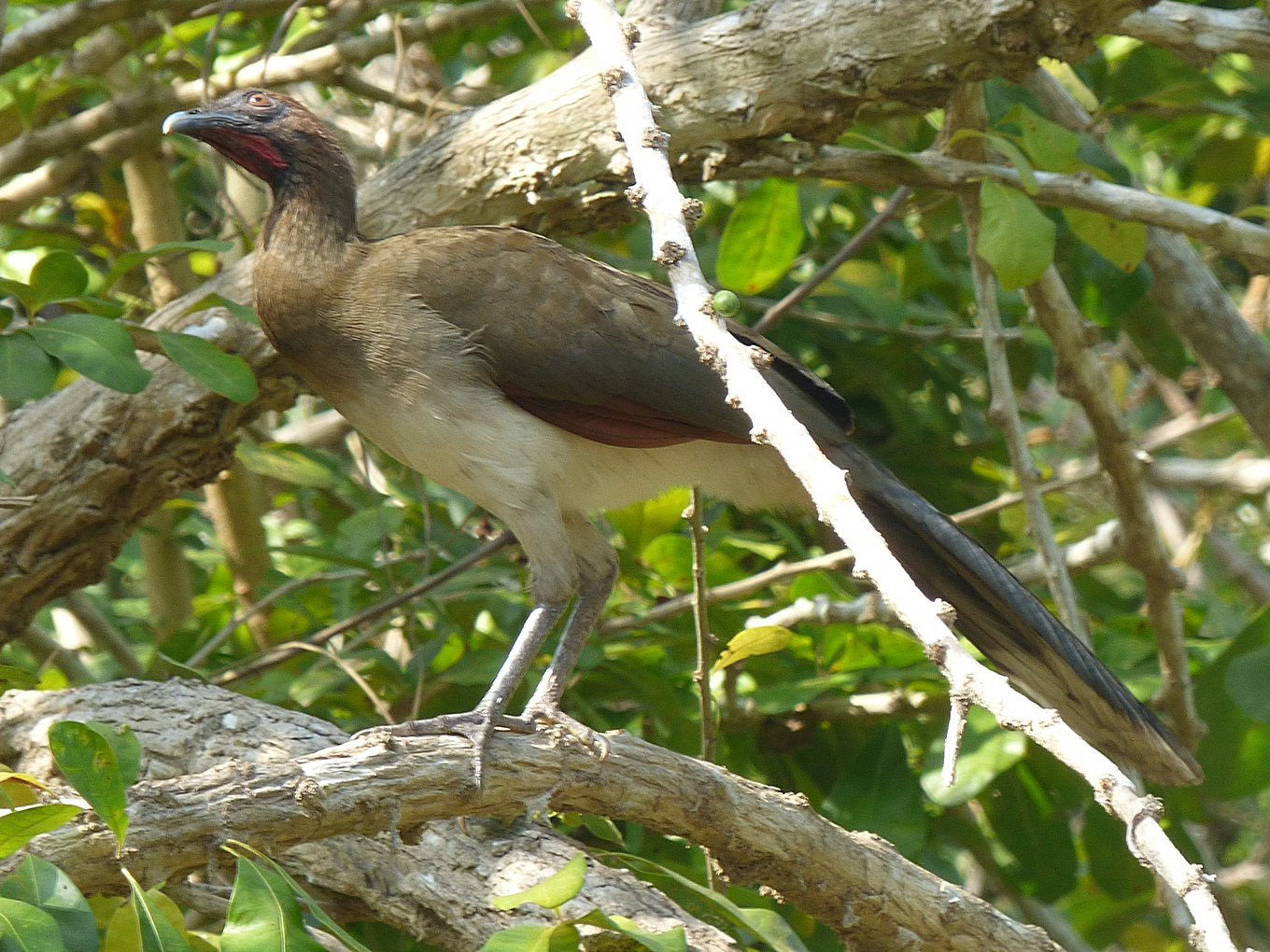

Conservation status
- Least Concern (IUCN 3.1)

Scientific classification
- Kingdom: Animalia
- Phylum: Chordata
- Class: Aves
- Order: Galliformes
- Family: Cracidae
- Genus: Ortalis
- Species: O. garrula

Binomial name
- Ortalis garrula (Humboldt, 1805)

= Chestnut-winged chachalaca =

Species of bird

The chestnut-winged chachalaca (Ortalis garrula) is a species of bird in the family Cracidae, the chachalacas, guans, and curassows. It is endemic to Colombia.

== Taxonomy and systematics ==
The chestnut-winged chachalaca was at one time treated as conspecific with the grey-headed chachalaca (Ortalis cinereiceps). It is monotypic.

== Description ==
The chestnut-winged chachalaca is 53 to 60 cm (1.7 to 2.0 ft) long. One male weighed 755 g (1.7 lb) and a female 630 g (1.4 lb). Both sexes have brown upperparts that are lighter on the crown and nape; the tail is dark gray-brown with a white tip. The throat and upper breast are also brown with a sharp demarcation between it and the white lower breast, flanks, and belly. The primary flight feathers are bright chestnut. The eye is surrounded by bare reddish to black skin.

== Distribution and habitat ==
The chestnut-winged chachalaca is found in northern Colombia in an area roughly bounded on the west by the Sinú River, in the east by the foothills of the Sierra Nevada de Santa Marta, and in the south by the lower Cauca and Magdalena River valleys. It inhabits a variety of landscapes characterized by thick vegetation such as scrubby deciduous forest, arid scrub, tropical thickets, and mangroves. It shuns the interior of dense forest but can be found on its edges. In elevation it ranges from sea level to about 800 m (2,600 ft).

== Behavior ==
=== Feeding ===
The chestnut-winged chachalaca forages in groups of up to eight, generally in trees but sometimes on the ground. In contrast to some other chachalacas, it is quiet as it gleans. Its diet is both fruits and leaves, with more of the former eaten during the rainy season and the latter during the dry season.

=== Breeding ===
The chestnut-winged chachalaca breeds during the dry season, between January and April. The nest is a simple platform placed in a tree. The clutch size can be up to four eggs.

=== Vocalization ===
The chestnut-winged chachalaca is vocal throughout the year (mostly at dawn) but more so during the breeding season. The most commonly heard sound is a duet rendered as "wha-cha-rá" that carries a great distance.

== Status ==
The IUCN has assessed the chestnut-winged chachalaca as being of Least Concern. It is believed to be reasonably common in most of its range. However, very little of its original habit remains unaltered and it shuns deforested areas.
