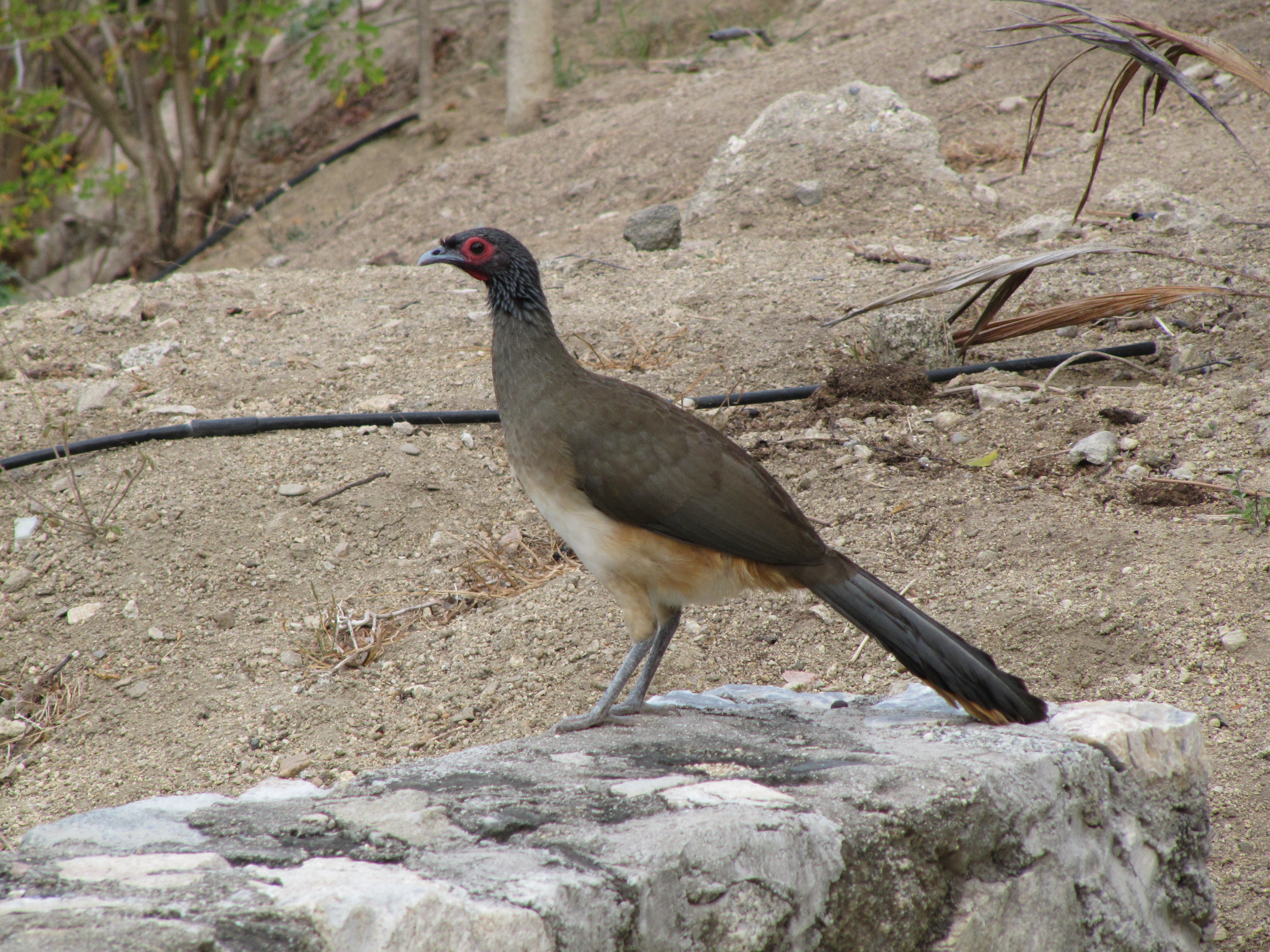
- In Mexico

Conservation status
- Least Concern (IUCN 3.1)

Scientific classification
- Domain: Eukaryota
- Kingdom: Animalia
- Phylum: Chordata
- Class: Aves
- Order: Galliformes
- Family: Cracidae
- Genus: Ortalis
- Species: O. poliocephala

Binomial name
- Ortalis poliocephala (Wagler, 1830)

= West Mexican chachalaca =

Species of bird

The West Mexican chachalaca (Ortalis poliocephala) is a species of bird in the family Cracidae, the chachalacas, guans, and curassows. It is endemic to Mexico.

== Taxonomy and systematics ==
The West Mexican chachalaca was first described as Penelope poliocephala and later moved to genus Ortalis. At one time it was considered a subspecies of plain chachalaca (Ortalis vetula). After being reinstated as a species, some authors included what is now the rufous-bellied chachalaca (O. wagleri) as a subspecies. In its current status, the West Mexican chachalaca is monotypic.

== Description ==
The West Mexican chachalaca is 58.5 to 68.5 cm (1.9 to 2.2 ft) long. One male weighed 760 g (1.7 lb). Its crown and nape are dull brownish gray and the rest of the upperparts pale brownish olive. The tail is slightly grayer and the feathers have broad buff tips. The breast is grayish olive and the belly whitish with a buff wash. The hazel eye is surrounded by bare carmine skin.

== Distribution and habitat ==
The West Mexican chachalaca is found in a swath of southwestern Mexico between northern Jalisco and southwestern Chiapas and inland as far as southwestern Puebla. It primarily inhabits mature deciduous forest, thorn scrub, and secondary forest. Locally it inhabits pine-oak forest and sometimes is found in mangroves and palm plantations. In elevation it ranges from sea level to 2,400 m (7,900 ft).

== Behavior ==
=== Feeding ===
The West Mexican chachalaca forages mostly on the ground but will also ascend into vegetation. About two thirds of its diet is fruit, with flowers, seeds, leaves, and insects making up the rest.

=== Breeding ===
The West Mexican chachalaca's breeding season spans from April to August with a June-July peak. The nest is constructed by both sexes; it is a shallow platform of sticks lined with leaves and bromeliads sited up to 5 m (16 ft) above the ground. One described clutch was three eggs. The female alone incubates eggs but both sexes care for the young.

=== Vocalization ===
The West Mexican chachalaca's principal vocalization is "a group of 'gruff, throaty, rhythmic chattering, chur-uh-uh-uhr, etc'."

== Status ==
The IUCN has assessed the West Mexican chachalaca as being of Least Concern. It is deemed fairly common to common throughout its range. It is commonly hunted for food but apparently not to excess.
