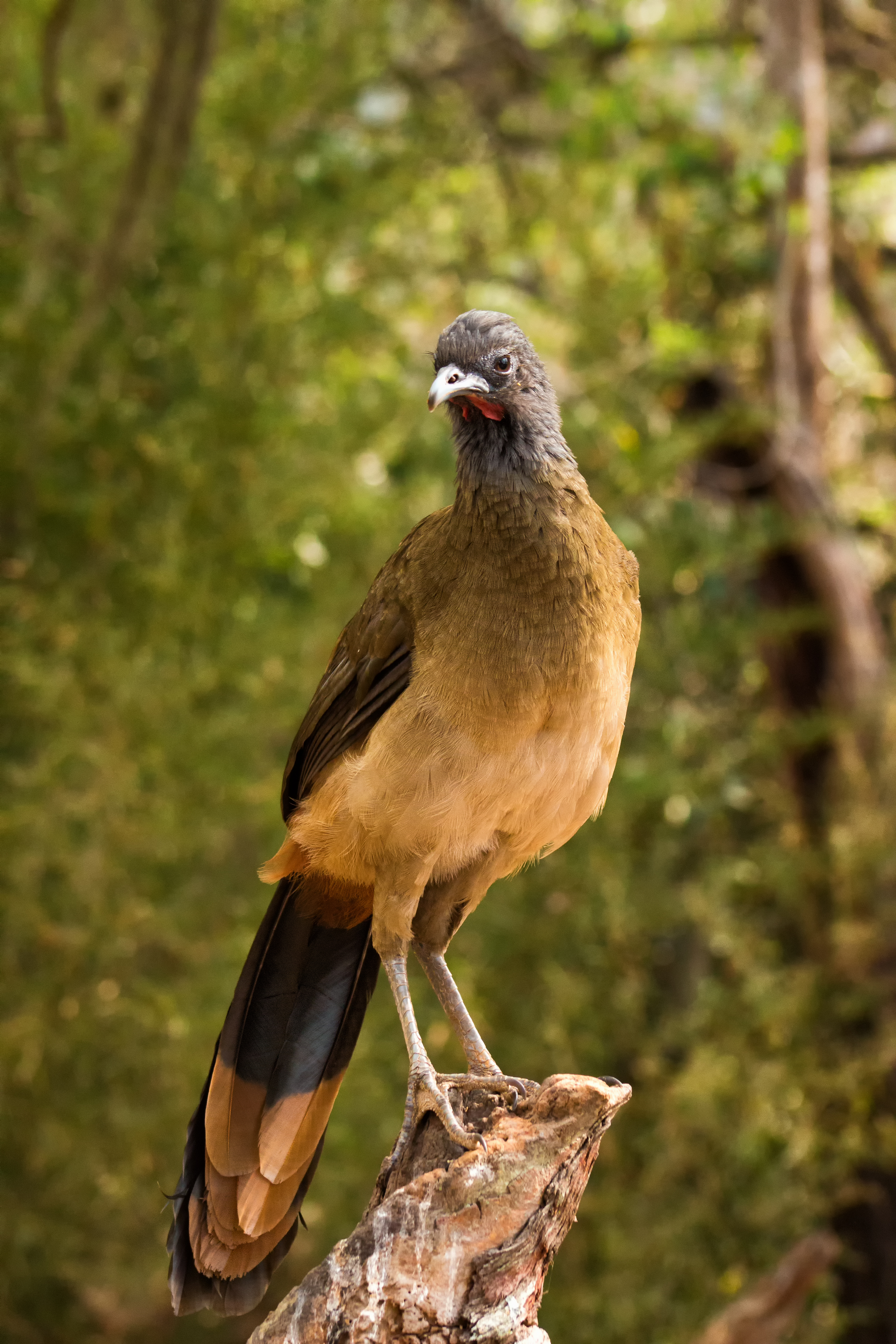
- In Venezuela

Conservation status
- Least Concern (IUCN 3.1)

Scientific classification
- Kingdom: Animalia
- Phylum: Chordata
- Class: Aves
- Order: Galliformes
- Family: Cracidae
- Genus: Ortalis
- Species: O. ruficauda

Binomial name
- Ortalis ruficauda Jardine, 1847

= Rufous-vented chachalaca =

Species of bird

The rufous-vented chachalaca (Ortalis ruficauda) is a member of an ancient group of birds of the family Cracidae, which are related to the Australasian mound builders. It inhabits northeast Colombia and northern Venezuela where it is called guacharaca, and the island of Tobago in Trinidad and Tobago where it is known as the cocrico and is one of the country's two national birds (being featured on the country's coat of arms). It is also found on Bequia and Union Island in the Grenadines where it may have been introduced.

== Habitat ==
The rufous-vented chachalaca is a largely arboreal species found in forest and woodland, but it is also found in more open dry scrubby areas. This combined with relatively low hunting pressure, make it far less vulnerable than larger members of the family, notably curassows.

== Description ==
These are medium-sized birds, similar in general appearance to turkeys, with small heads, long strong legs and a long broad tail. They are typically 53–58 cm long; the female weighs 540g and the larger male 640g. They have fairly dull plumage, dark brown above and paler below. The head is grey, and the brown tail is tipped rufous or white depending on race.

== Call ==
As other chachalacas, the rufous-vented chachalaca is a very noisy species, preferring to execute their vocal feats at dawn. The male's call is a loud low ka-ka-rooki-rooki-ka, answered by the female's high-pitched watch-a-lak, which they often repeat several times in a row, in precise synchronization.

Calls of a male and female guacharaca
Recorded before dawn, in Caraballeda, Venezuela.

== Breeding and behaviour ==
The species is a social bird, often seen in family groups. It walks along branches seeking the fruit (such as mangoes, berries and those from the Euterpe palm), leaves and seeds on which it feeds. It is an able flyer that can even take off and fly vertically, but does not usually fly long distances. The twig nest is built low in a tree, and three or four large white eggs are laid. The female incubates them alone.

== Subspecies ==
There are two subspecies:

- O. r. ruficauda (Jardine, 1847) - northeast Colombia to northern Venezuela, also Tobago and Isla Margarita
- O. r. ruficrissa (Sclater and Salvin, 1870) - northern Colombia and northwest Venezuela
