= Plain chachalaca =

- A plain chachalaca in Tulum, MX.

Conservation status
- Least Concern (IUCN 3.1)

- Secure (NatureServe)

Scientific classification
- Kingdom: Animalia
- Phylum: Chordata
- Class: Aves
- Order: Galliformes
- Family: Cracidae
- Genus: Ortalis
- Species: O. vetula

Binomial name
- Ortalis vetula (Wagler, 1830)
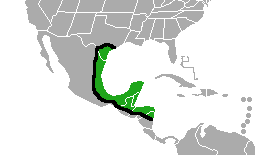
- Approximate range (all-year resident)

Species of bird

The plain chachalaca (Ortalis vetula) is a large bird in the chachalaca, guan and curassow family Cracidae. It breeds in tropical and subtropical environments from mezquital thickets in the Rio Grande Valley in southernmost Texas, United States to northernmost Costa Rica. In Central America, this species occurs in the Pacific lowlands from Chiapas, Mexico to northern Nicaragua and as a separate population in Costa Rica, where its range is separated by a short distance, as a disjunct population.

This species frequents dry and moist forests, especially where interspersed with scrub and savanna. Usually found in groups of up to 15 birds, the plain chachalaca is furtive and wary and prefers to escape from danger by running swiftly on the ground or leaping and gliding through brushy tangles. The plain chachalaca feeds in trees or on the ground on fruit (figs, palms, Sapotaceae), seeds, leaves, and flowers. It is sometimes a pest of crops such as tomatoes and cucumbers.

The call is a loud, raucous RAW-pa-haw or cha-cha-LAW-ka, often by several birds in a rhythmical chorus, especially in early morning and evening, usually from well up in trees. It also produces peeping whistles and cackles. Others describe chachalaca calls as irritating noises mimicking a bunch of men arguing. The plain chachalaca typically breeds in the early wet season. The nest is a shallow saucer of twigs and plant fibers, lined with leaves, in thick vegetation. The clutch is 2–4 rough-shelled white to cream eggs.

== Taxonomy ==
The plain chachalaca is related to the West Mexican chachalaca and the white-bellied chachalaca, and both of these were formerly considered a subspecies of the plain chachalaca. Today all major authorities recognize them as separate species. Their ranges slightly overlap in Mexico, but hybrids have not been reported between them. The white-bellied chachalaca may be more closely related to the little chachalaca than the plain chachalaca.

There are five recognized subspecies:

- O. v. deschauenseei – Bond, 1936 - Utila chachalaca: Utila Island, off Honduras
- O. v. mccallii – Baird, 1858: extreme southern Texas in the United States to northern Veracruz in Mexico
- O. v. intermedia – Peters, 1913: southern Yucatán (Mexico) to Belize and Guatemala, (sometime included in O. v. vetula)
- O. v. pallidiventris – Ridgway, 1887: northern Yucatán Peninsula
- O. v. vetula – (Wagler, 1830): nominate, southern Veracruz in Mexico to northwest Costa Rica

The isolated population in Costa Rica is assigned to the nominate race of the plain chachalaca, but has also been assigned to the white-bellied chachalaca and may in fact represent a new subspecies of the plain chachalaca - its plumage is closer to this species than the white-bellied.

== Description ==
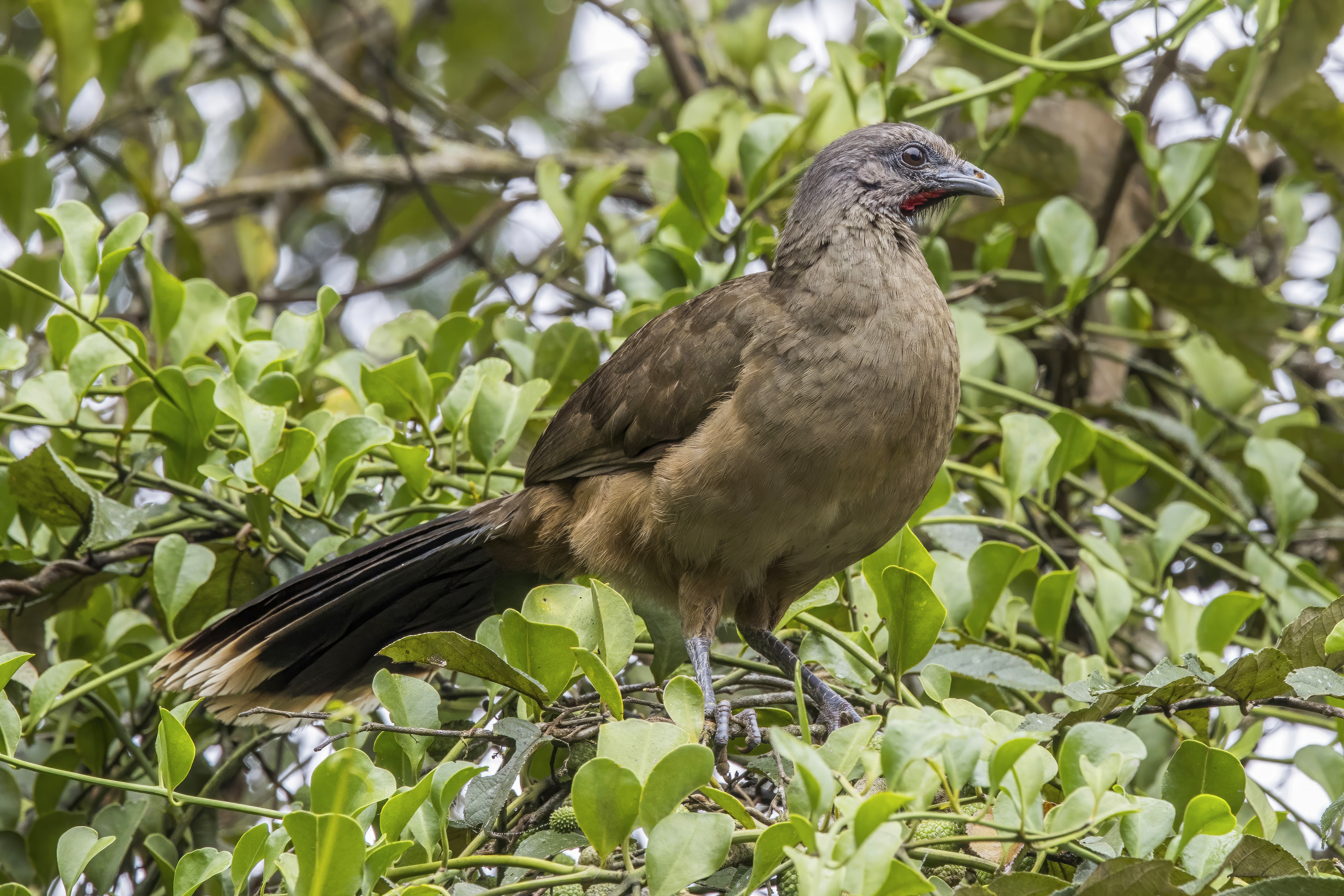
O. v. vetula Tikal, Peten, Guatemala.

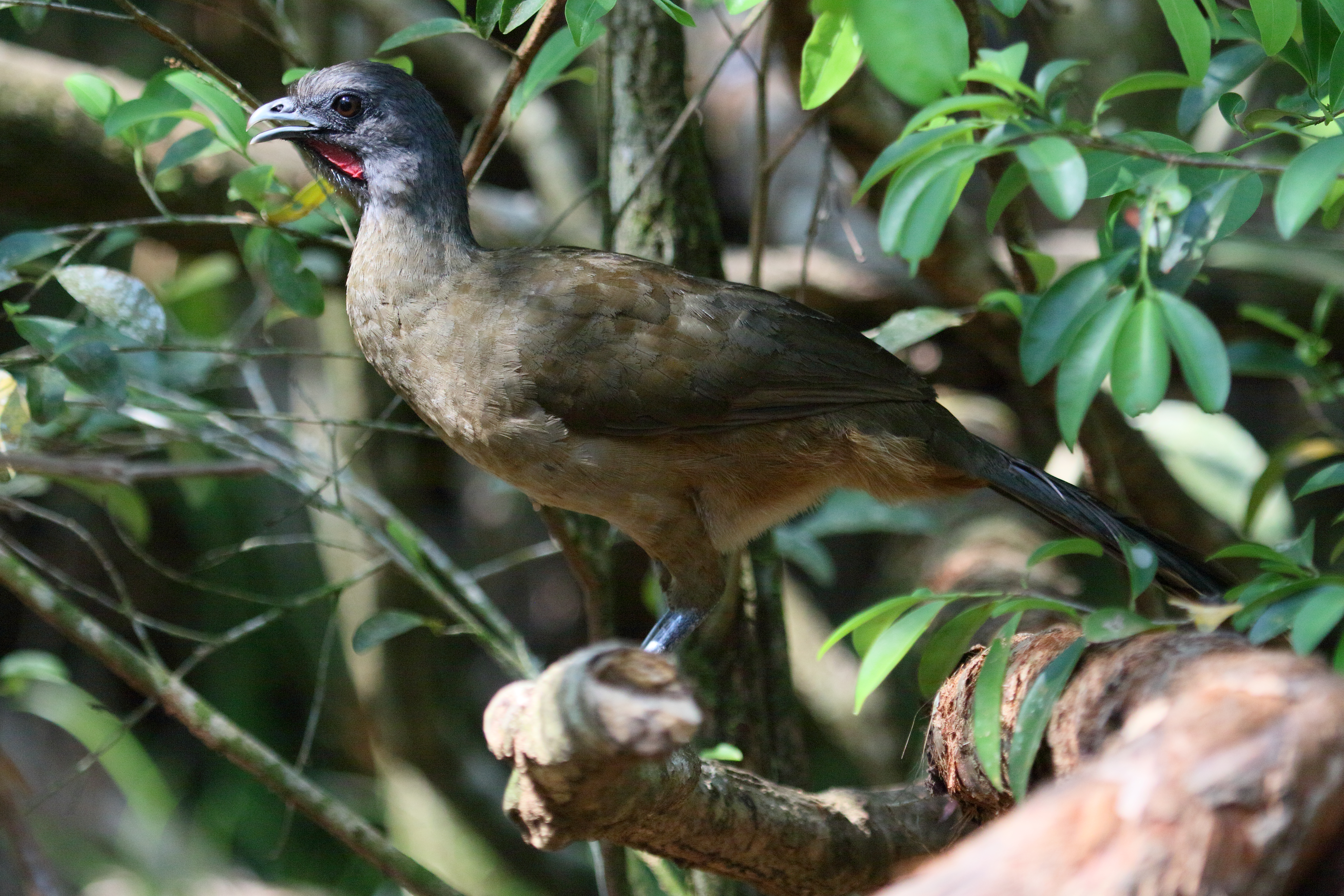
Plain chachalaca in Belize showing red throat-patch

The plain chachalaca is a medium-sized galliform, around the size of a common pheasant. It measures 48–58 cm (19–23 in) in length, and varies in weight from 468–794 g (16.5–28.0 oz) for males and 439–707 g (15.5–24.9 oz)in females Males are on average larger but because of overlap that isn't diagnostic of sex, and in appearance they are the same. It is long-necked with a small head and bare throat patch which becomes deep red in both sexes during the breeding season. Adults have a greyish head and neck with a dull olive-brown body and wings. The underbelly is pale to ochraceous and the tail is blackish with green gloss and buffy-white tip. The iris is brown and bill is black; orbital skin and the feet are dull grey.

O. vetula is a host to the helminth parasite Dispharynx nasuta. Christensen & Pence 1977 find they carry D. nasuta but not Echinuria uncinata, Streptocara crassicauda, or Streptocara incognita.

== Distribution and habitat ==
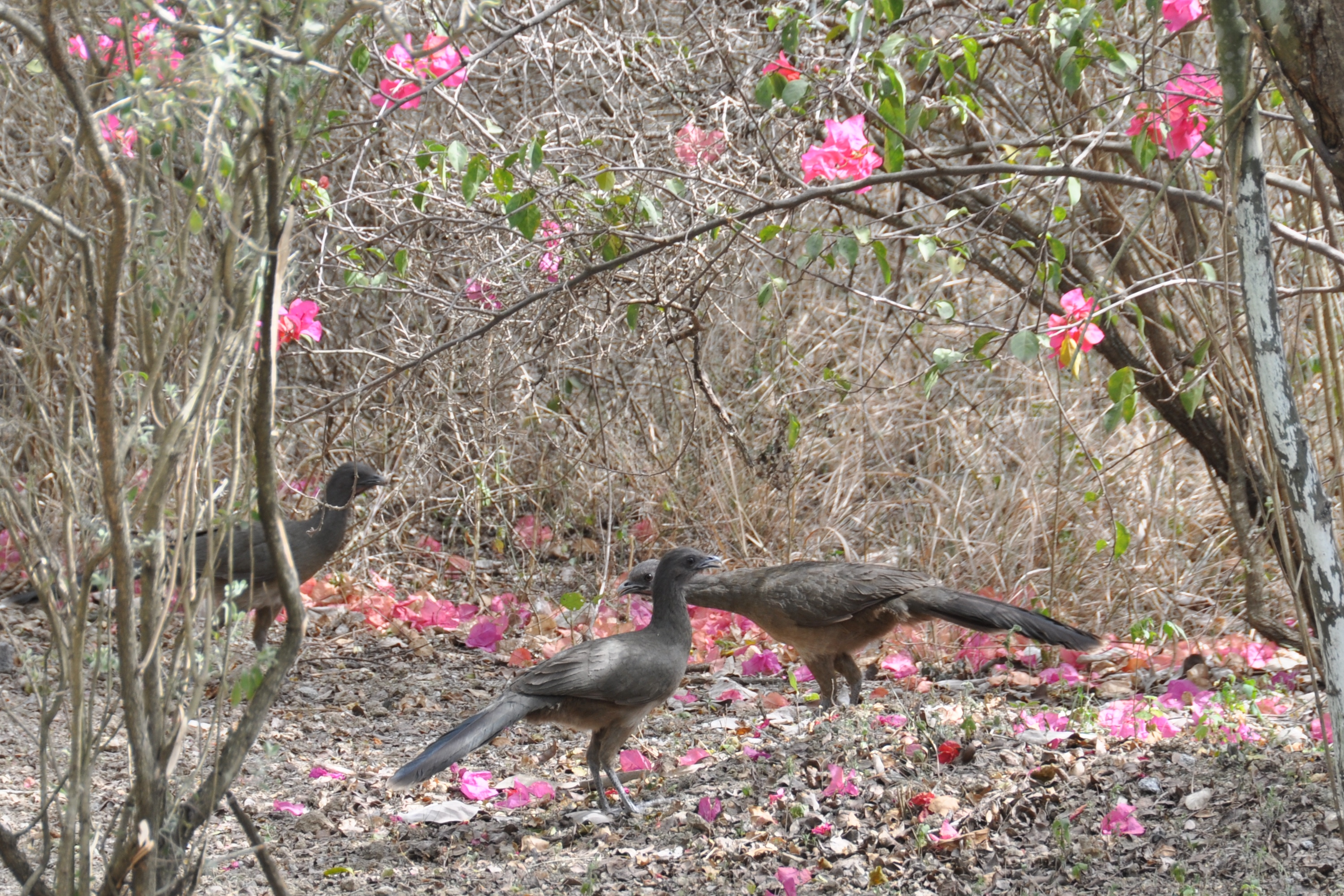
Plain chachalacas can often be found in low scrubland

The plain chachalaca is found from Texas, in the Lower Rio Grande, through the eastern coast of Mexico, the Yucatán Peninsula, Belize, northern Guatemala, northern Honduras and just into the north central part of Nicaragua, with a small population on the Nicoya Peninsula of northern Costa Rica. The species has also been introduced and established to San Patricio County in Texas and three islands, Sapelo, Blackbeard and Little St. Simons Island, on the coast of Georgia. In some of its mainland North American introduced range it is considered invasive.

The plain chachalaca occupies a wide range of habitats, including primary forest, secondary forest, forest edge and riverine forest, thorny bush-scrub, and shrubland. It is also found in human modified habitats such as orchards, suburban parks and gardens and croplands. Unlike other cracids, it is able to adapt to the scrubland that arises after the clearing of tropical rainforest. It can be found from sea-level to 1,850 m (6,070 ft)

== Behavior ==
The plain chachalaca is mostly diurnal and is most active in cool mornings and in the evening. It is mostly inactive during the heat of the day. Pairs or family groups roost communally in trees, usually on a branch, often touching, and facing the same way.

When it comes to the plain chachalaca's diet, the primary plant species eaten in great volume by them include coyotillo (Karwinskia humboldtiana), Mexican ash (Fraxinus berlandieriana), pigeon-berry (Rivina humilis), and cedar elm (Ulmus crassifolia). The most frequent items of food were discovered to be small fruits and buds of pigeon-berry, followed by anacua and coyotillo berries. Animal matter was found in only four birds and consisted of small snails, caterpillars, and a lace bug, presumably taken incidentally on plant material.

=== Breeding ===
Nests are in trees, large shrubs, or vines, 5–35 feet above the ground. Both male and female arrange nest material, and the whole nest averages 8.5 in (22 cm) across. The clutch consists of two to four white eggs.

== Conservation ==
Hunting of the plain chachalaca is restricted to subsistence hunting, for example by the Mayan people in southern Mexico. The plain chachalaca population is 500,000–5,000,000 (2006 IUCN Red List). It is not threatened. However the subspecies from Útila Island, O. v. deschauenseei, has sometimes been listed as extinct, but recent surveys have confirmed that it still survives.

Chachalaca are viewed as a game animal in Texas.
