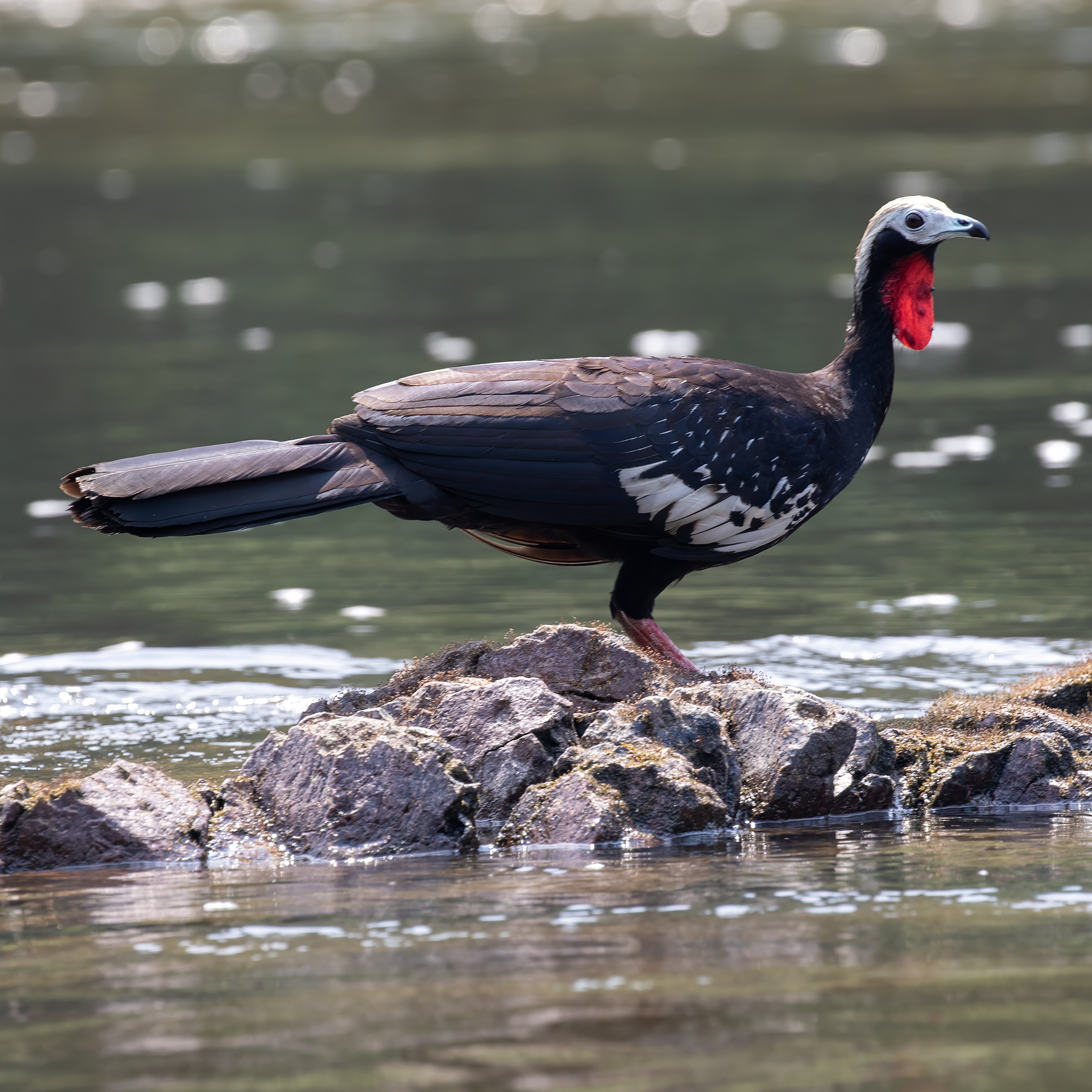
- In Mato Grosso, Brazil

Conservation status
- Vulnerable (IUCN 3.1)

Scientific classification
- Kingdom: Animalia
- Phylum: Chordata
- Class: Aves
- Order: Galliformes
- Family: Cracidae
- Genus: Pipile
- Species: P. cujubi

Binomial name
- Pipile cujubi (Pelzeln, 1858)

Subspecies
- Pipile c. cujubi (Pelzeln, 1858) stripe-crowned piping guan; Pipile c. nattereri (Reichenbach, 1861)Natterer's piping guan

Synonyms
- Penelope cujubi; Aburria cujubi

= Red-throated piping guan =

Species of bird

The red-throated piping guan (Pipile cujubi) is a species of bird in the chachalaca, guan, and curassow family Cracidae. It is found in Bolivia and Brazil.

== Taxonomy and systematics ==
The taxonomies of the International Ornithological Committee (IOC), The Clements Checklist of Birds of the World, and Handbook of the Birds of the World treat the red-throated piping guan as one of four species in genus Pipile. Though also agreeing with this treatment, the South American Classification Committee of the American Ornithological Society notes that "evidence for species rank for the four species of Pipile is weak". Various authors have proposed instead that the genus contains one, two, or three species, or that it should be subsumed entirely into genus Aburria with the wattled guan (A. aburri).

As currently accepted, the red-throated piping guan has two subspecies, the nominate Pipile cujubi cujubi and P. c. nattereri. The latter is sometimes treated as a subspecies of blue-throated piping guan (P. cumanensis) or as a species in its own right.

== Description ==
The red-throated piping guan is 69 to 76 cm (2.26 to 2.49 ft) long; P. c. nattereri weighs 1,100 to 1,300 g (2.4 to 2.9 lb). Both subspecies are black overall with black-and-white patches on the wings, a shaggy white crest, white speckles on the breast, bare pale blue skin on the face, and a red gular patch. The nominate subspecies is glossier than P. c. nattereri, with a blue sheen, and the white wing patches are smaller.

== Distribution and habitat ==
The nominate subspecies of red-throated piping guan is found in north-central Brazil south of the Amazon River from the lower reaches of the Madeira River east into northern Pará state. P. c. nattereri is found in western Amazonian Brazil in an area roughly bounded by the states of Pará, Goiás, Amazonas, and Rondônia and also in the eastern part of Bolivia's Santa Cruz department. They inhabit tropical and semi-deciduous forests in lowlands up to 700 m (2,300 ft). They prefer forests with a minimum height of 15 m (49 ft).

== Behavior ==
=== Feeding ===
The red-throated piping guan forages in flocks of up to about 30 birds and sometimes in mixed flocks with blue-throated piping guan, usually in the canopy but sometimes on the ground. The details of its diet have not been documented but it is known to feed on fruit and flowers.

=== Breeding ===
Almost nothing is known about the red-throated piping guan's breeding phenology.

=== Vocal and non-vocal sounds ===
The red-throated piping guan's song is "a rising series of clear whistles", usually made in the morning. Its wing-whirring display, " a coarse, doubled, ripping noise", is usually given at dawn.

== Status ==
The IUCN has assessed the red-throated piping guan as being Vulnerable. It is considered fairly common to common in much of its large range, but hunting and deforestation are threats.
