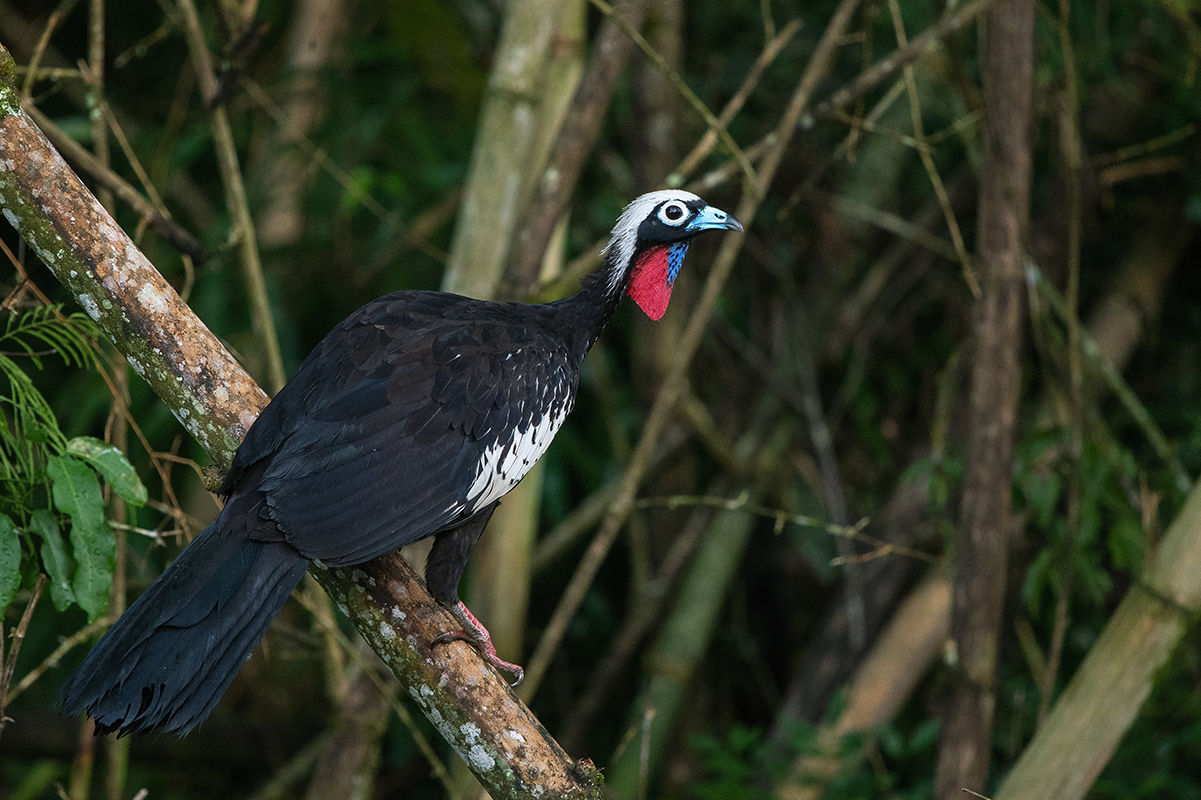
- At Iguazu, Argentina

Conservation status
- Endangered (IUCN 3.1)
- CITES Appendix I

Scientific classification
- Kingdom: Animalia
- Phylum: Chordata
- Class: Aves
- Order: Galliformes
- Family: Cracidae
- Genus: Pipile
- Species: P. jacutinga

Binomial name
- Pipile jacutinga (Spix, 1825)

Synonyms
- Penelope jacutinga Spix, 1825; Aburria jacutinga (Spix, 1825)

= Black-fronted piping guan =

Species of bird

The black-fronted piping guan (Pipile jacutinga) or jacutinga in Brazilian Portuguese is a bird in the chachalaca, guan, and curassow family Cracidae. It is native to the Serra do Mar coastal forests, Paraguay and northeastern Argentina.

== Taxonomy and systematics ==
The taxonomies of the International Ornithological Committee (IOC), The Clements Checklist of Birds of the World, and Handbook of the Birds of the World treat the black-fronted piping guan as one of four species in genus Pipile. Though also agreeing with this treatment, the South American Classification Committee of the American Ornithological Society notes that "evidence for species rank for the four species of Pipile is weak". Various authors have proposed instead that the genus contains one, two, or three species, or that it should be subsumed entirely into genus Aburria with the wattled guan (A. aburri).

As currently accepted, the black-fronted piping guan is monotypic.

== Description ==
The black-fronted piping guan is 63.5 to 74 cm (2.08 to 2.43 ft) long and weighs 1,100 to 1,400 g (2.4 to 3.1 lb). It is similar in general appearance to a slim turkey, with a thin neck and small head. It is mainly black with a bluish gloss and a conspicuous white wing patch bearing rows of black dots. It has a large white crest and a red throat wattle with a dark blue patch at the front. Its ring of bare white skin around the dark eye and black-feathered face and forehead are unique in its genus. The legs and feet are red.

== Distribution and habitat ==
Though it was formerly more widespread, the black-fronted piping guan is now found spottily in two general areas. It ranges near the Brazilian coast roughly from Paraná state north to Rio de Janeiro and also in Argentina's far northeastern Misiones Province and adjacent eastern Paraguay. It is the only piping guan in this range though formerly it overlapped a small amount with blue-throated piping guan (P. cumanensis) in Paraguay. It inhabits several types of Atlantic Forest including evergreen, gallery, and coastal. It is almost always found in mature primary forest though also in older secondary forest and restinga. In elevation it formerly ranged from sea level as high as 1,850 m (6,070 ft) but now is usually found only below 1,000 m (3,300 ft)

== Behavior ==
=== Movement ===
Some altitudinal and seasonal movements by the black-fronted piping guan have been documented, though the reasons for them are not clear.

=== Feeding ===
The black-fronted piping guan forages alone, in pairs, or in groups as large as 11, usually in trees but sometimes on the ground. Its diet is primarily fruit, and studies in Brazil have documented 41 species eaten there. It will occasionally eat seeds, buds, insects, and molluscs. It tends to remain in an area of fruiting trees until they are bare.

=== Breeding ===
The black-fronted piping guan's breeding season appears to span at least August to December based on the dates of observations of displays, eggs, and nestlings. Their nest is a platform made of twigs and stems placed in the fork of a tree. The clutch size is two to four eggs. Almost all incubation is by the female but both sexes provision young.

=== Vocal and non-vocal sounds ===
The black-fronted piping guan's primary vocalization is a "series of thin, rising whistles similar to those of congenerics". Its alarm call is also similar to that of other Pipile but with a more metallic tone. A dusk and dawn wing-whirring display has "two silent wingbeats, a long dry rattle, two more quick wingbeats and finally an even longer rattle".

== Status ==
The IUCN assessed the black-fronted piping-guan in 1988 as Threatened, then in 1994 as Vulnerable, and since 2004 as Endangered. Its range and population have been severely reduced by habitat destruction and hunting and it is now rare outside of a few protected areas. Even in protected areas poaching for food and feathers remains a problem.
