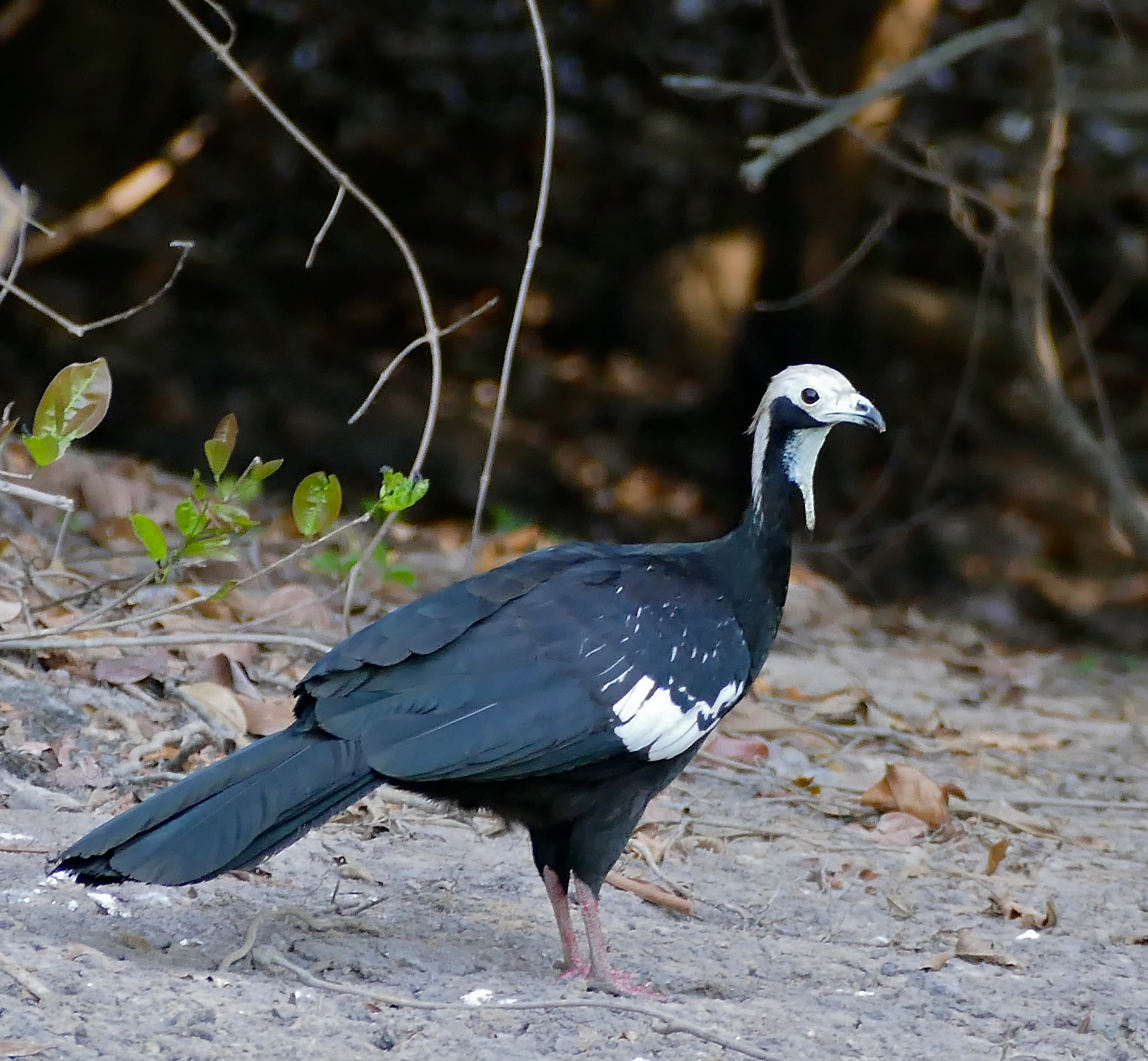
- In the Pantanal, Brazil

Conservation status
- Near Threatened (IUCN 3.1)

Scientific classification
- Kingdom: Animalia
- Phylum: Chordata
- Class: Aves
- Order: Galliformes
- Family: Cracidae
- Genus: Pipile
- Species: P. grayi

Binomial name
- Pipile grayi (Pelzeln, 1870)

= White-throated piping guan =

Species of bird

The white-throated piping guan (Pipile grayi) is a near threatened species of bird in subfamily Penelopinae of family Cracidae, the guans, chachalacas, and curassows. It is found in Bolivia, Brazil, Paraguay, and Peru.

== Taxonomy and systematics ==
The genus Pipile has been treated as including anywhere from one to five species depending on the criteria used by the various authors and taxonomic systems. At various times from one to four of them have been treated as subspecies of the Trinidad piping guan (P. pipile). By early 2023, major worldwide taxonomic systems had settled on five species including the white-throated piping guan, which had been considered a subspecies of the blue-throated piping guan (P. cumanensis). The white-throated piping guan is monotypic according to the worldwide systems. However, the South American Classification Committee of the American Ornithological Society retains the white-throated piping guan as a subspecies of the blue-throated.

== Description ==
The white-throated piping guan is 60 to 69 cm (24 to 27 in) long. The sexes are alike. Most of their plumage is blackish with a light olive to olive green gloss that is strongest on the shoulders, wings, and tail. Their forehead, crown, and nape are white, as are the fringes of their breast feathers. The crown feathers are hair-like and have black or brownish black shafts that show as streaks The outer wing coverts are also white and show as a large patch on the folded wing; the inner coverts have white spots. White to cobalt blue bare skin surrounds the dark reddish brown eye. Bare skin forming a dewlap is also white to cobalt blue. Their bill can be pale blue with a black tip or black with a pinkish and blue base. Their legs are brownish red.

== Distribution and habitat ==
The white-throated piping-guan is found from extreme southeastern Peru through north-central and eastern Bolivia into southwestern Brazil and northern Paraguay. It inhabits humid tropical forest of the Amazon Basin including terra firme, várzea, and gallery types, and also cerrado woodland. It almost always occurs within about 100 m (330 ft) of rivers. In elevation it reaches 1,500 m (4,900 ft) in Bolivia.

== Behavior ==
=== Movement ===
The white-throated piping guan is thought to be mostly sedentary but it possibly makes local or elevational movements according to the availability of fruit.

=== Feeding ===
The white-throated piping guan's diet is mostly fruits and leaves. Fruits of many plant families are consumed. During the nesting season it forages in pairs or family groups but outside that season may gather in flocks of up to about 20 birds, especially at salt licks. It typically forages in the canopy or just below it but may feed on the ground under a fruiting tree. It also regularly forages with other cracids.

=== Breeding ===
The white-throated piping guan places its nest in the dense forest canopy. Nothing else is known about the species' breeding biology.

=== Vocal and non-vocal sounds ===
The white-throated piping guan is vocal mostly, and possibly solely, in the breeding season. It makes a flight display with one or two wing-claps followed by its song, "ca. 8‒10 slow, clear, slightly ascending whistles, with each note becoming progressively longer...rendered püüeee, püüeee, püüeee...". The display may be given above the forest canopy, and is usually made at dawn and dusk. Another display is "wing-whirring... two quick and often barely audible wing-claps, followed by two or three whirring rattles...using the wings, prrrrrrrip-purrrrrr" The sound has "been likened to a deck of cards being fanned backwards and forwards."

== Status ==
The IUCN has assessed the white-throated piping guan as Near Threatened "owing to the combined impacts of habitat loss and hunting pressure" but it "appears able to tolerate heavily modified habitats and proximity to human infrastructure."
