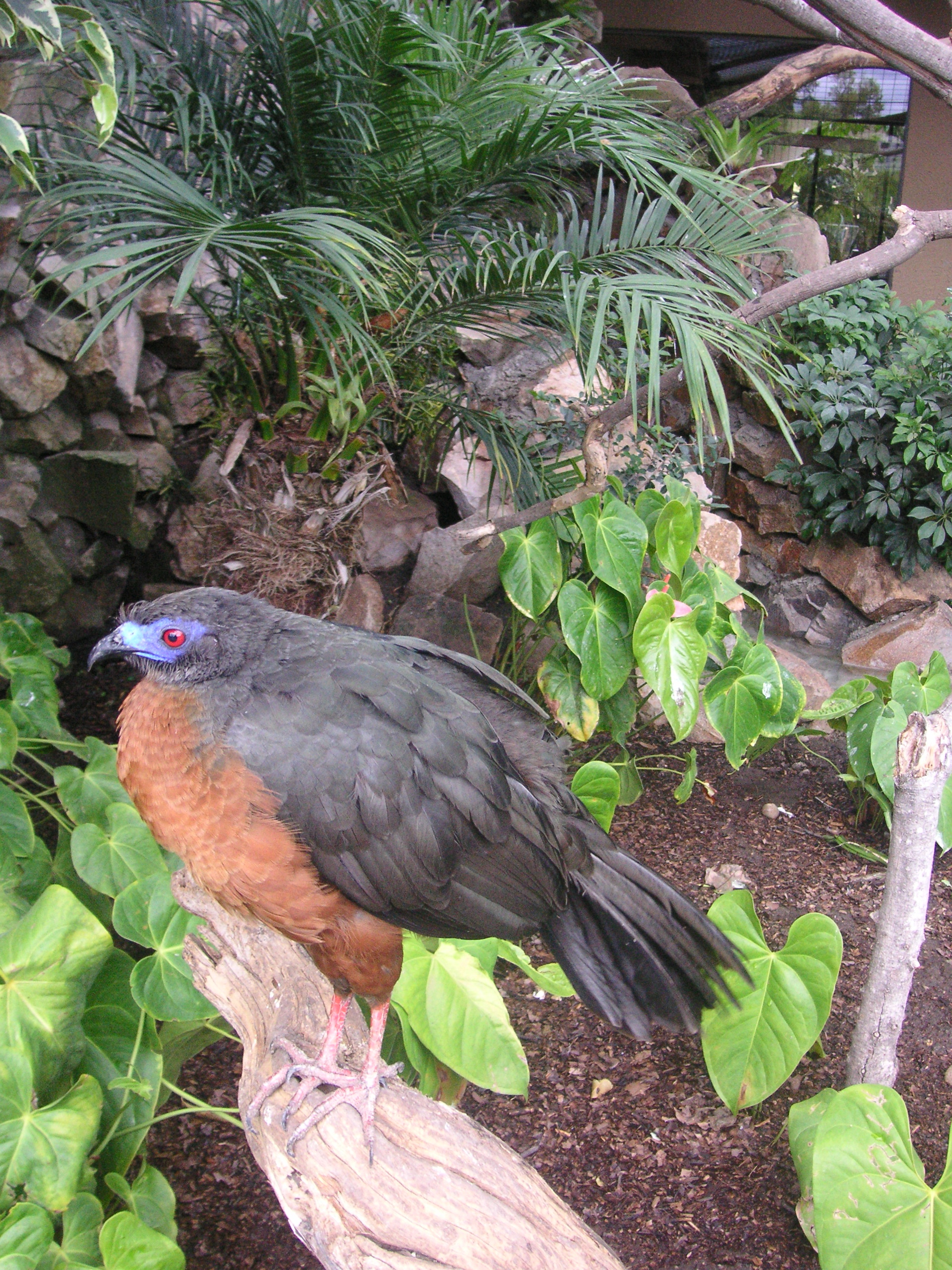

Conservation status
- Least Concern (IUCN 3.1)

Scientific classification
- Domain: Eukaryota
- Kingdom: Animalia
- Phylum: Chordata
- Class: Aves
- Order: Galliformes
- Family: Cracidae
- Genus: Chamaepetes
- Species: C. goudotii

Binomial name
- Chamaepetes goudotii (Lesson, 1828)

Subspecies
- C. g. goudotii (Lesson, 1828); C. g. sanctaemarthae (Chapman, 1912); C. g. fagani (Chubb, 1917); C. g. tschudii (Taczanowski, 1886); C. g. rufiventris (Tschudi, 1843)

= Sickle-winged guan =

Species of bird

The sickle-winged guan (Chamaepetes goudotii) is a species of bird in the chachalaca, guan, and curassow family Cracidae. It is found in Bolivia, Colombia, Ecuador, and Peru.

== Taxonomy and systematics ==
The sickle-winged guan shares the genus Chamaepetes with the black guan (C. unicolor) of southern Central America and may form a superspecies with it. It has the five subspecies listed in the box to the right.

== Description ==
The sickle-winged guan is 50 to 65 cm (1.64 to 2.13 ft) long and weighs 550 to 800 g (1.21 to 1.76 lb). The subspecies differ in size; C. g. tschudii and C. g. rufiventris are the largest. Adults of the nominate subspecies have a brown head and neck, dark upperparts, bright chestnut belly, pale blue facial skin, and red eyes. Juveniles are similar but duller. C. g. sanctaemarthae's upper breast, throat, and cheeks are redder than the nominate's and its vent area a darker red. C. g. fagani's head and upperparts are much darker than those of the nominate and sanctaemarthae and its underparts are chestnut. C. g. tschudii is similar to fagani but has more olive-brown upperparts and the chestnut of the underparts is lighter. C. g. rufiventris has gray edges on its neck feathers that give a scaly appearance; it is also a paler olive above and less chestnut on the underparts than tschudii.

== Distribution and habitat ==
The subspecies of sickle-winged guan are distributed thus:

- C. g. goudotii, western and central Andes of Colombia south to Nariño Department
- C. g. sanctaemarthae, Sierra Nevada de Santa Marta of northeastern Colombia
- C. g. fagani, west slope of the Andes from Colombia's Nariño Department south to Ecuador's El Oro Province
- C. g. tschudii, east slope of the Andes from southern Colombia through Ecuador to Peru's Department of San Martín
- C. g. rufiventris, east slope of the Andes from central to southern Peru and isolated areas in north and central Bolivia

The sickle-winged guan inhabits humid and wet forest, preferring tall forest but also found at edges and in secondary forest. The sickle-winged guan is generally a bird of middle elevations. It reaches as high as 3,000 m (9,800 ft) in the Sierra Nevada de Santa Marta but elsewhere in Colombia is mostly between 1,100 and 2,500 m (3,600 and 8,200 ft). In Peru it is typically found between 1,450 and 2,500 m (4,760 and 8,200 ft). Its Bolivian populations are at the highest elevations, 2,500 to 3,500 m (8,200 to 11,500 ft).

== Behavior ==
=== Feeding ===
The sickle-winged guan primarily forages in fruiting trees, often as high as 13 m (43 ft) above ground. Pairs forage together or as part of groups of up to eight birds, usually around dawn and dusk. It mostly feeds on small fruits but also adds flowers, leaves, and invertebrates for as much as 15% of its diet. In some areas it frequents feeding stations to eat bananas.

=== Breeding ===
The sickle-winged guan's breeding season in the Colombian Andes spans from January to June and may extend beyond that in other areas. The nest is a platform of thin branches, moss, and green and dead vegetation, usually placed in a tree fork or on a bromeliad. The clutch size is two or three eggs.

=== Vocal and non-vocal sounds ===
The fagini subspecies of sickle-winged guan gives an " extremely thin, high-pitched...whistle" and a "keeeeeee-uk!" alarm call. Its wing-whirring display is usually given at dawn and dusk as it flies back and forth between two trees.

== Status ==
The IUCN has assessed the sickle-winged guan as being of Least Concern. It is considered to be fairly common to common except in the Sierra Nevada de Santa Marta and the small Bolivian enclaves. It appears to tolerate some habitat alteration and, at least away from villages, to not have much hunting pressure.
