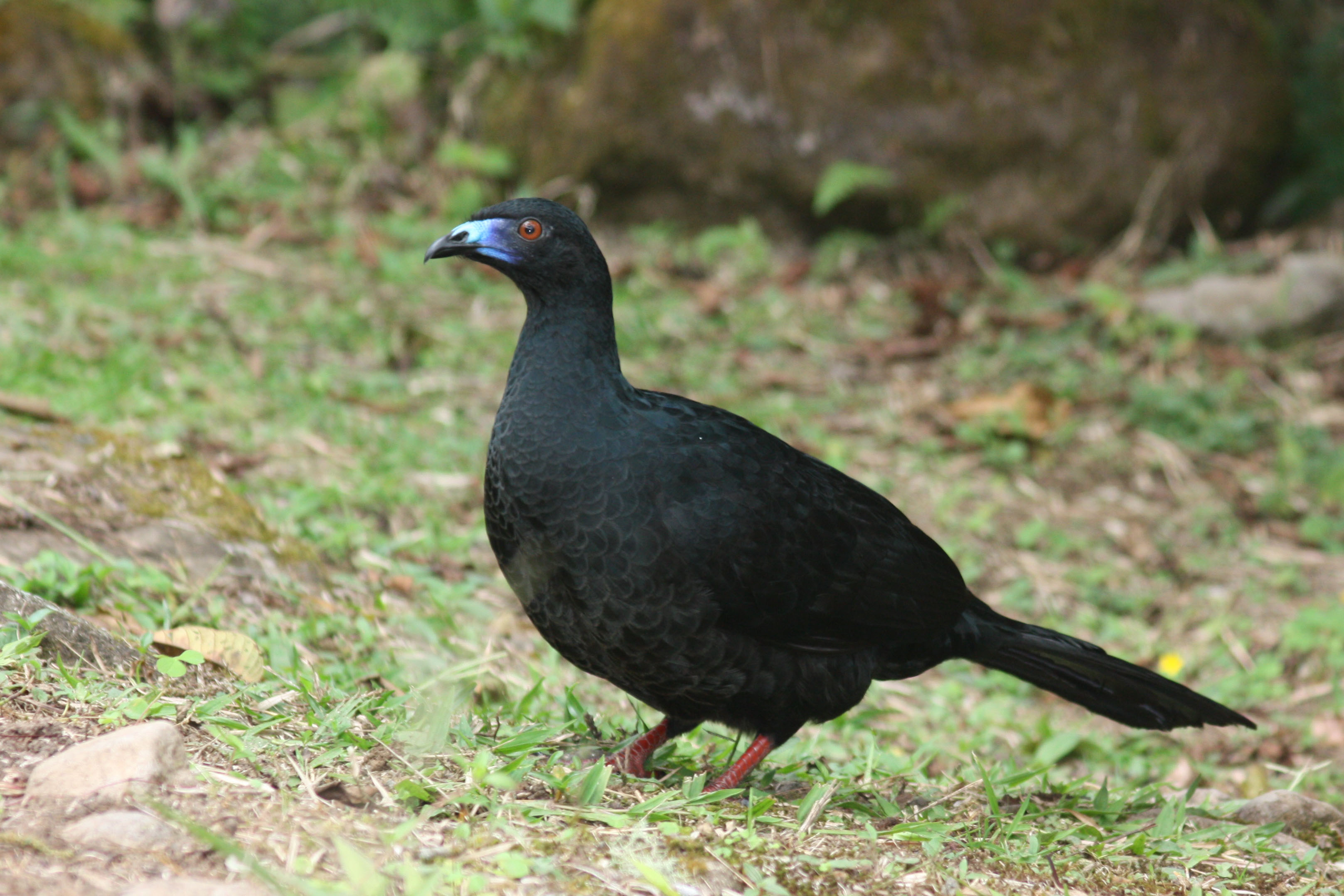

Conservation status
- Least Concern (IUCN 3.1)

Scientific classification
- Kingdom: Animalia
- Phylum: Chordata
- Class: Aves
- Order: Galliformes
- Family: Cracidae
- Genus: Chamaepetes
- Species: C. unicolor

Binomial name
- Chamaepetes unicolor Salvin, 1867

= Black guan =

Species of bird

The black guan (Chamaepetes unicolor) is a species of bird in the chachalaca, guan, and curassow family Cracidae. It is found in Costa Rica and Panama.

== Taxonomy and systematics ==
The black guan shares the genus Chamaepetes with the sickle-winged guan (C. goudotii) of western South America and may form a superspecies with it.

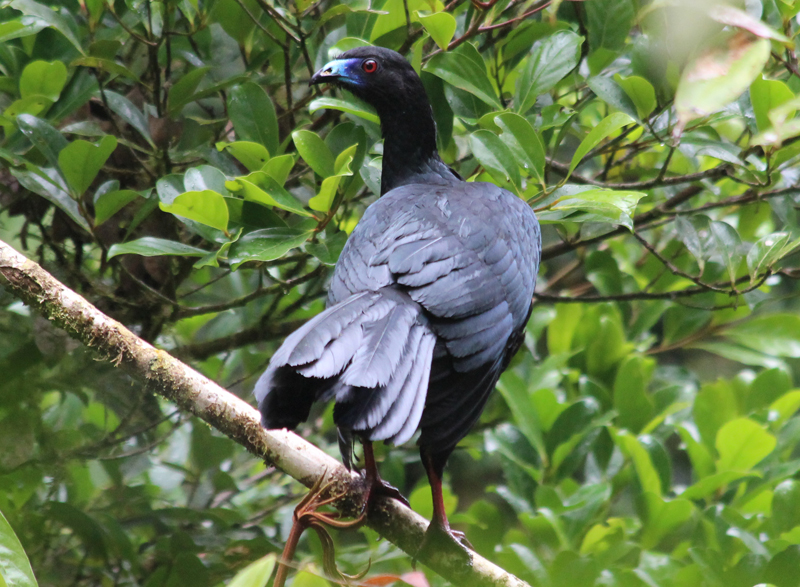
Monteverde, Costa Rica

== Description ==
The black guan is 62 to 69 cm (2.03 to 2.26 ft) long and weighs about 1,135 g (2.502 lb). Adults have all black plumage with contrasting bright blue facial skin around a red eye. Their legs and feet are pinkish-red. Juveniles are similar but less glossy and their underparts browner and their facial skin is blackish or dark brown.

== Distribution and habitat ==
The black guan is found from the Cordillera de Guanacaste in northern Costa Rica to western Coclé Province in Panama. It inhabits cloudforest in the Talamancan montane forest ecozone. It prefers steep terrain in the temperate, subtropical, and tropical zones, usually between about 1,000 and 2,250 m (3,280 and 7,380 ft) of elevation, but in some areas as low as 800 m (2,600 ft) and in others as high as 3,000 m (9,800 ft).

== Behavior ==
=== Movement ===
The black guan is thought to be mainly sedentary but there is some evidence of seasonal elevation changes.

=== Feeding ===
The black guan forages singly, in pairs, or in small groups. Its primary diet is fruits; studies in Costa Rica have identified at least 35 different species eaten. It mostly feeds in trees but will also eat fallen fruit on the ground.

=== Breeding ===
The black guan's breeding season is believed to span from February to June. The one described nest was a small platform of twigs and leaves placed in a clump of epiphytes in a tree 4.5 m (15 ft) above the ground. The clutch size is two or three eggs.

=== Vocal and non-vocal sounds ===
The black guan's vocalizations include piping calls in the breeding season, a "a low, deep 'ro-rooo' or coughing 'kowr' if disturbed", and a "tsik tsik..." alarm call. At dawn and dusk it gives a "loud, sharp, crackling" wing-rattling display.

== Status ==
The IUCN has assessed the black guan as being of Least Concern. In Costa Rica it is fairly common in protected areas but in Panama only locally "rather numerous". However, even where nominally protected it is heavily hunted for food.
