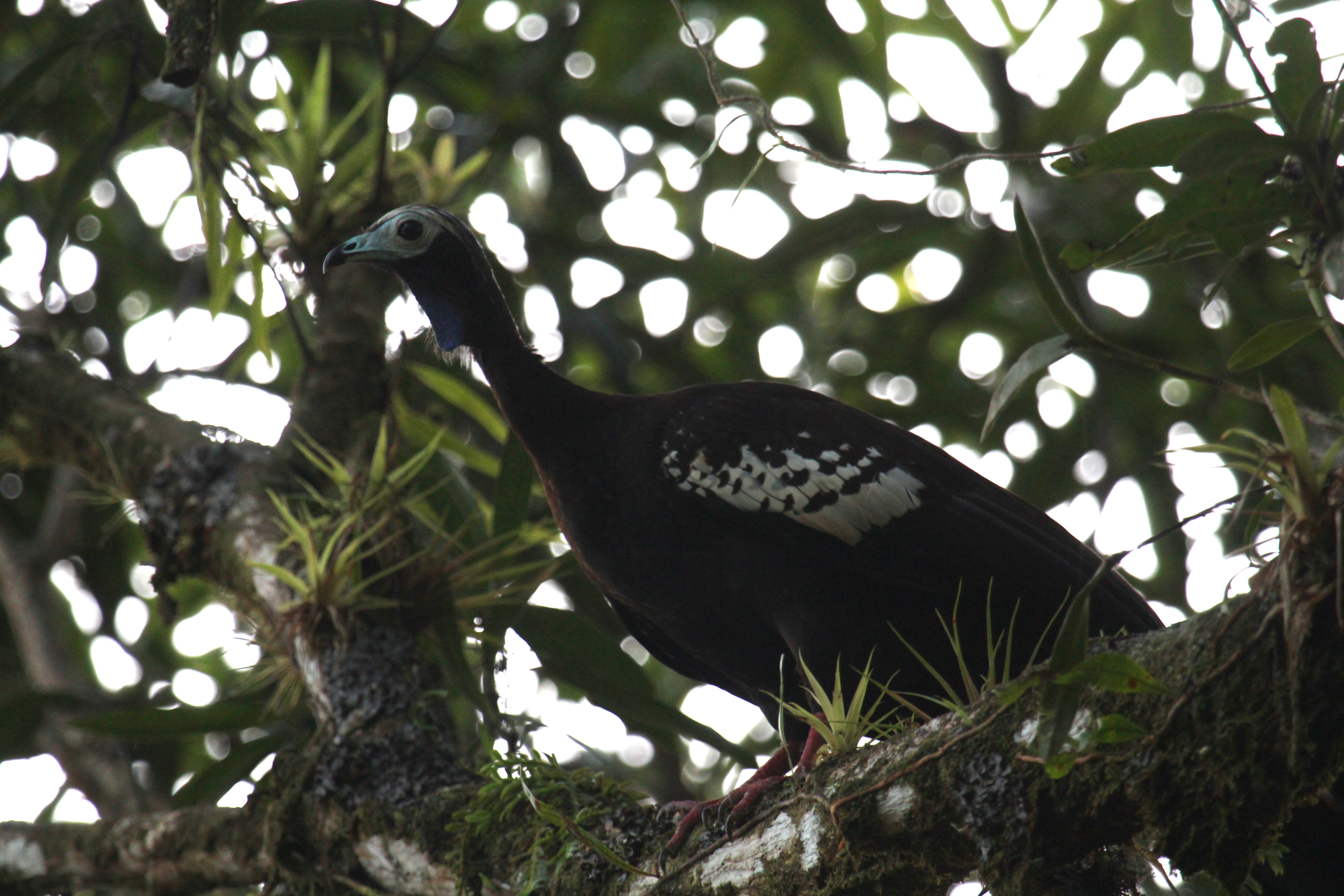

Conservation status
- Critically Endangered (IUCN 3.1)
- CITES Appendix I

Scientific classification
- Kingdom: Animalia
- Phylum: Chordata
- Class: Aves
- Order: Galliformes
- Family: Cracidae
- Genus: Pipile
- Species: P. pipile

Binomial name
- Pipile pipile (Jacquin, 1784)

= Trinidad piping guan =

Species of bird

The Trinidad piping guan (Pipile pipile) locally known as the pawi, is a bird in the chachalaca, guan and curassow family Cracidae, endemic to the island of Trinidad. It is a large bird, somewhat resembling a turkey in appearance, and research has shown that its nearest living relative is the blue-throated piping guan from South America. It is a mainly arboreal species feeding mostly on fruit, but also on flowers and leaves. At one time abundant, it has declined in numbers and been extirpated from much of its natural range and the International Union for Conservation of Nature has rated the bird as "critically endangered".

== Description ==
This is a medium-sized cracid, 60 cm in length, and similar in general appearance to a turkey, with a thin neck and small head. It is mainly black with a purple gloss. The large crest is blackish, edged with white, and there are large white wing patches. The bare face and wattle are blue, and the legs are red.

The Trinidad piping guan's call is a thin piping. The wings whirr in flight.

== Ecology ==
They are forest birds, and the nest is built in a tree. Three large white eggs are laid, the female alone incubating. This arboreal species feeds on fruit and berries (such as those from the fragrant nutmeg and baboonwood), as well as flowers and leaves. The confirmation of small insects being a part of their diet has not been made yet.

== Taxonomy ==
Data confirms that the other blue-wattled species, the blue-throated piping guan, is the Trinidad species' closest living relative. The same data suggests that these diverged some 400,000 years ago at latest, perhaps as early as 1.6 mya, whereas Trinidad has been an island only since the end of the last ice age. This indicates that the Trinidad piping guan evolved in mainland South America, being driven to its relict island range in more recent times. The holotype of this species was supposedly collected in the "Orinoco River [region] near Cumaná" (del Hoyo 1994a,b). This locality has usually been considered erroneous. However, as it indicates an area on the mainland roughly opposite Trinidad, it might actually be correct and indicate that the Trinidad piping guan was not extirpated from Venezuela until around 1800. In South America, the form cumanensis has a greenish gloss to the plumage, a white face and crest, and a blue wattle, cujubi has a blue face and a red wattle, and jacutinga has a black face and a red wattle."

== Status ==
This species is found only in Trinidad where it was once abundant throughout the Northern Range and the southern Trinity Hills, and also occurred in lowland areas such as the Nariva Swamp and Aripo Savannas. It is threatened by illegal hunting and to a lesser extent by habitat destruction. It is now absent from the lowlands, and almost certainly extinct in the Trinity Hills where surveys have failed to find it since 1994. There is a credible report of a sighting in 2000 in the Northern Range and there are 200 to 350 km^{2} (77 to 135 mi^{2}) of suitable habitat there so the International Union for Conservation of Nature has rated the bird as "critically endangered".
