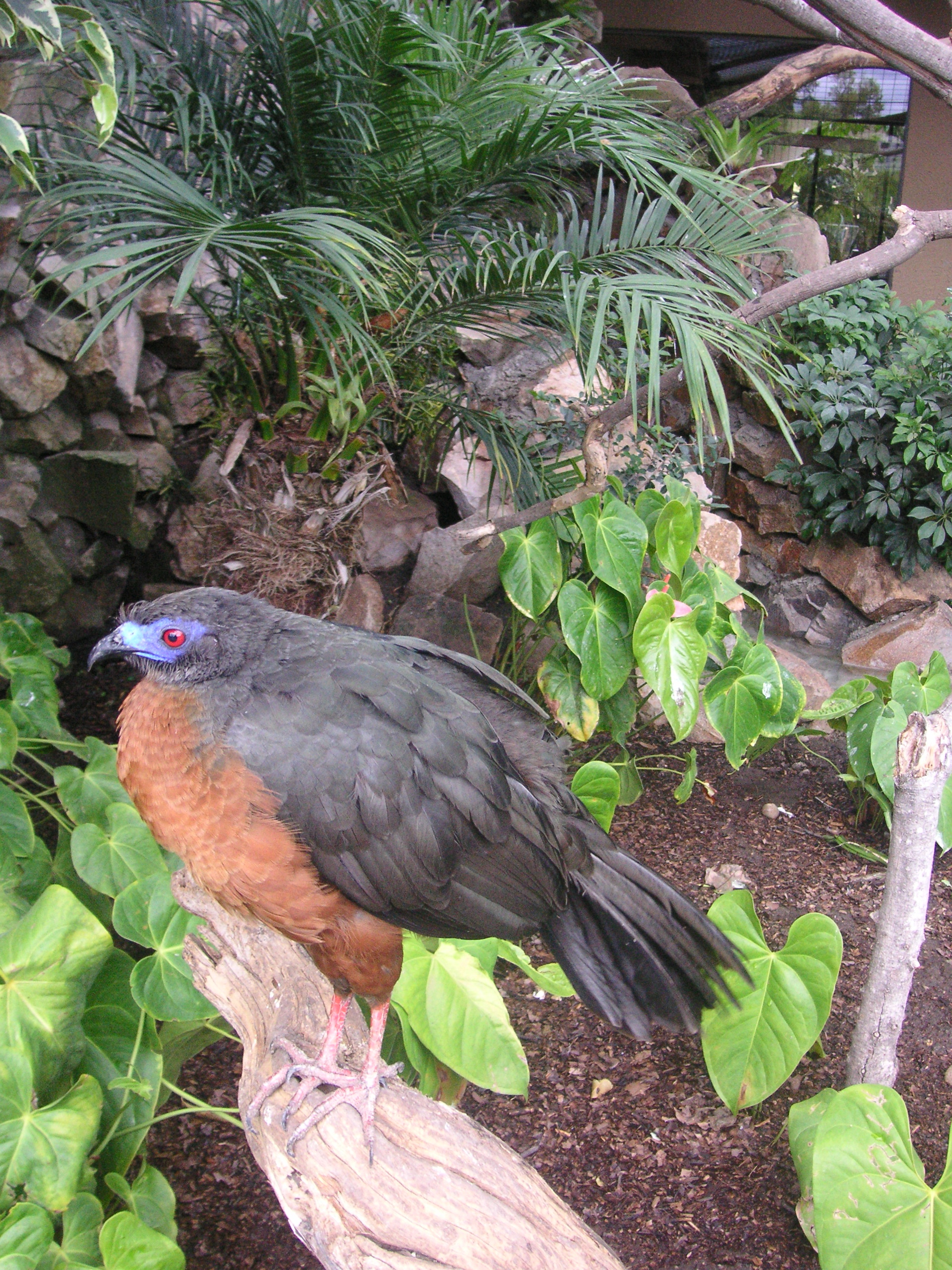
- Chamaepetes goudotii

Scientific classification
- Kingdom: Animalia
- Phylum: Chordata
- Class: Aves
- Order: Galliformes
- Family: Cracidae
- Subfamily: Penelopinae
- Genus: Chamaepetes; Wagler, 1832

Type species
- Ortalida goudotii Lesson, 1828

= Chamaepetes =

Genus of birds

Chamaepetes is a genus of bird in the family Cracidae. It contains the following species:

| Image | Scientific name | Common name | Distribution |
|---|---|---|---|
| | Chamaepetes goudotii | Sickle-winged guan | Bolivia, Colombia, Ecuador, and Peru |
| | Chamaepetes unicolor | Black guan | Costa Rica and Panama |
