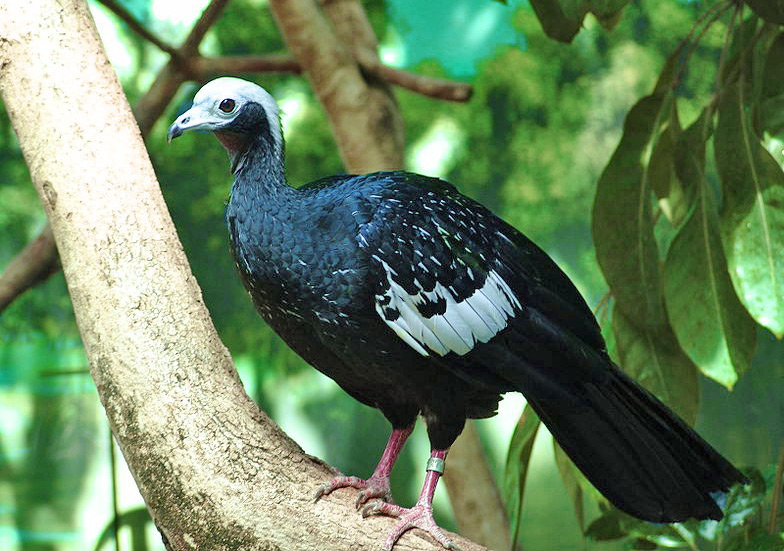

Conservation status
- Least Concern (IUCN 3.1)

Scientific classification
- Kingdom: Animalia
- Phylum: Chordata
- Class: Aves
- Order: Galliformes
- Family: Cracidae
- Genus: Pipile
- Species: P. cumanensis

Binomial name
- Pipile cumanensis (Jacquin, 1784)

= Blue-throated piping guan =

Species of bird

The blue-throated piping guan (Pipile cumanensis) is a species of bird in subfamily Penelopina of family Cracidae, the guans, chachalacas, and curassows. It is found in Bolivia, Brazil, Colombia, Ecuador, the Guianas, Peru, and Venezuela.

== Taxonomy and systematics ==
The genus Pipile has been treated as including anywhere from one to five species depending on the criteria used by the various authors and taxonomic systems. At various times from one to four of them have been treated as subspecies of the Trinidad piping guan (P. pipile). By early 2023, major worldwide taxonomic systems had settled on five species including the white-throated piping guan (P. grayi), which had been considered a subspecies of the blue-throated. The blue-throated piping guan is now monotypic according to the worldwide systems. However, the South American Classification Committee of the American Ornithological Society retains the white-throated piping guan as a subspecies of the blue-throated.

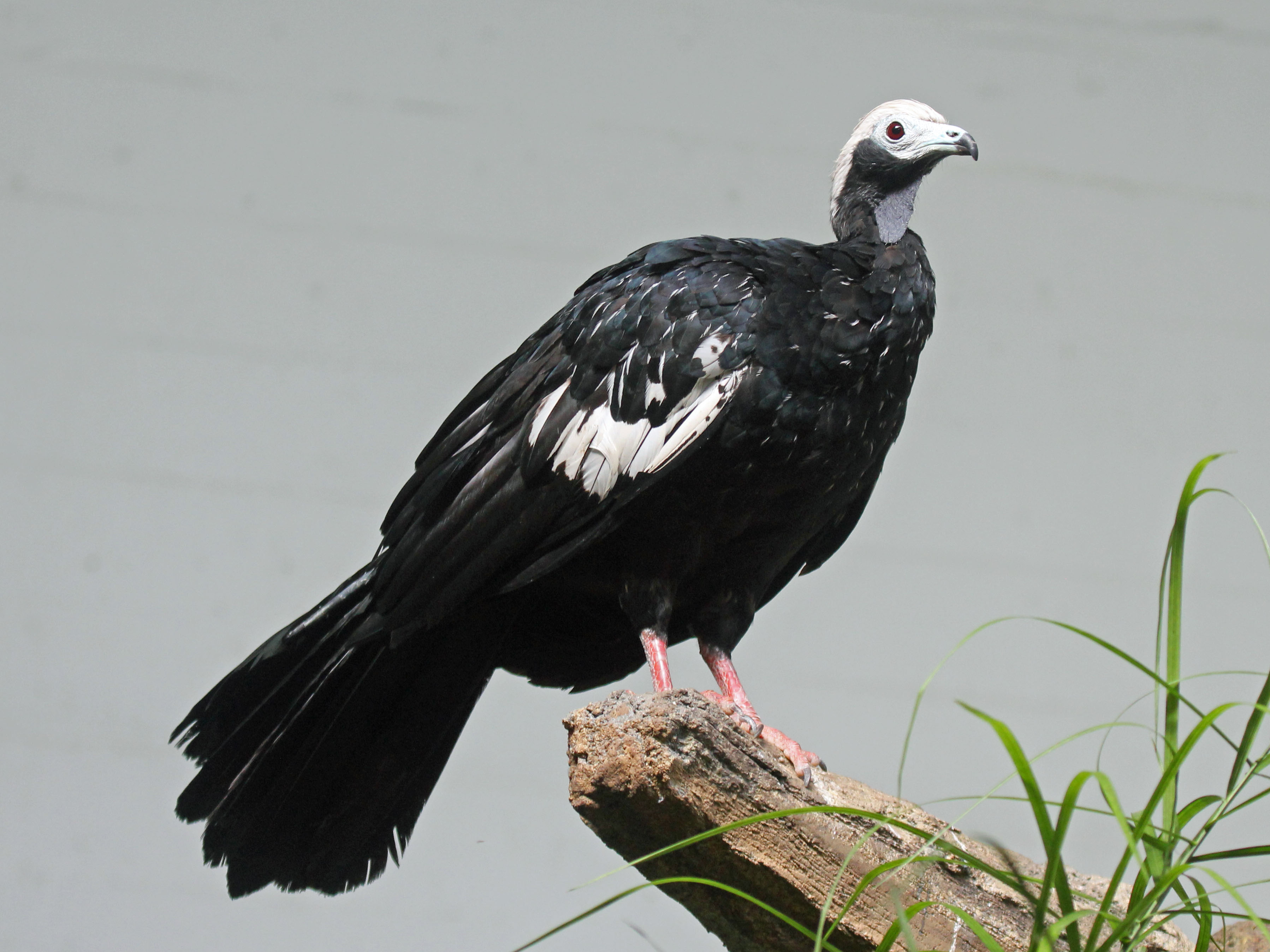
Blue-throated piping guan showing the blue throat

== Description ==
The blue-throated piping guan is described as "oddly 'prehistoric' (reptilian)" but "handsome". It is 60 to 69 cm (24 to 27 in) long and weighs about 970 to 1,350 g (2.14 to 2.98 lb). Its neck and tail are long, the neck and head disproportionately thin and small and the tail disproportionately long. The sexes are alike. Most of their plumage is blackish with a greenish blue gloss that is strongest on the shoulders, wings, and tail. Their forehead, crown, and nape are white, as are the fringes of their breast feathers. The outer wing coverts are also white and show as a large patch on the folded wing; the inner coverts have white spots. White to cobalt blue bare skin surrounds the dark reddish brown eye. Bare skin forming a dewlap can be white to cobalt blue, slaty purple, dark purplish gray, or black. Their bill can be pale blue with a black tip or black with a pinkish and blue base. Their legs are reddish, brownish red, or rose.

== Distribution and habitat ==
The blue-throated piping-guan is found in far northwestern Bolivia, eastern Peru and eastern Ecuador, central and eastern Colombia, southern and eastern Venezuela, the Guianas, and northwestern Brazil. It inhabits humid tropical forest of the Amazon Basin including terra firme, várzea, gallery, and semi-deciduous types. In the Guianas it is also found in less forested coastal areas. It almost always occurs within about 100 m (330 ft) of rivers. In elevation it reaches 300 m (980 ft) in Bolivia, 400 m (1,300 ft) in Ecuador, 500 m (1,600 ft) in Colombia, 1,000 m (3,300 ft) in Venezuela, and 1,100 m (3,600 ft) in Peru.

== Behavior ==
=== Movement ===
The blue-throated piping guan is thought to be mostly sedentary but it possibly makes local or elevational movements according to the availability of fruit.

=== Feeding ===
The blue-throated piping guan's diet is mostly fruits and leaves. The favored fruit is figs but those of many other plant families are also consumed. During the nesting season it forages in pairs or family groups but outside that season may gather in flocks of up to about 30 birds, especially at salt licks. It typically forages in the canopy or just below it but may feed on the ground under a fruiting tree. The species also engages in geophagy.

=== Breeding ===
The blue-throated piping guan's breeding season in general spans from August to possibly April; it appears to be during the local wet season. Its nest has not been described in detail but is built from twigs and usually placed high up in the dense canopy. The clutch size is one to three eggs. The incubation period is known only in captivity, where it ranges from 24 to 28 days. The time to fledging is not known.

=== Vocal and non-vocal sounds ===
The blue-throated piping guan is vocal mostly, and possibly solely, in the breeding season. It makes a flight display with one or two wing-claps followed by its song, "ca. 6‒10 slow, clear, slightly ascending whistles, with each note becoming progressively longer...rendered püüeee, püüeee, püüeee...". The display may be given above the forest canopy, and is usually made at dawn and dusk. Another display is "wing-whirring... two quick and often barely audible wing-claps, followed by two or three whirring rattles...using the wings, prrrrrrrip-purrrrrr" The sound has "been likened to a deck of cards being fanned backwards and forwards."

== Status ==
The IUCN has assessed the blue-throated piping guan as being of Least Concern. It has a very large range but its population size is not known and is believed to be decreasing. It is hunted for food and kept in captivity but no immediate threats have been identified. It varies from rare in a few areas to common. Its "preference for river edges and the species' conspicuous habits have apparently rendered it more vulnerable than other cracids of tropical forests." "It also suffers in places from habitat destruction, mainly for agriculture."
