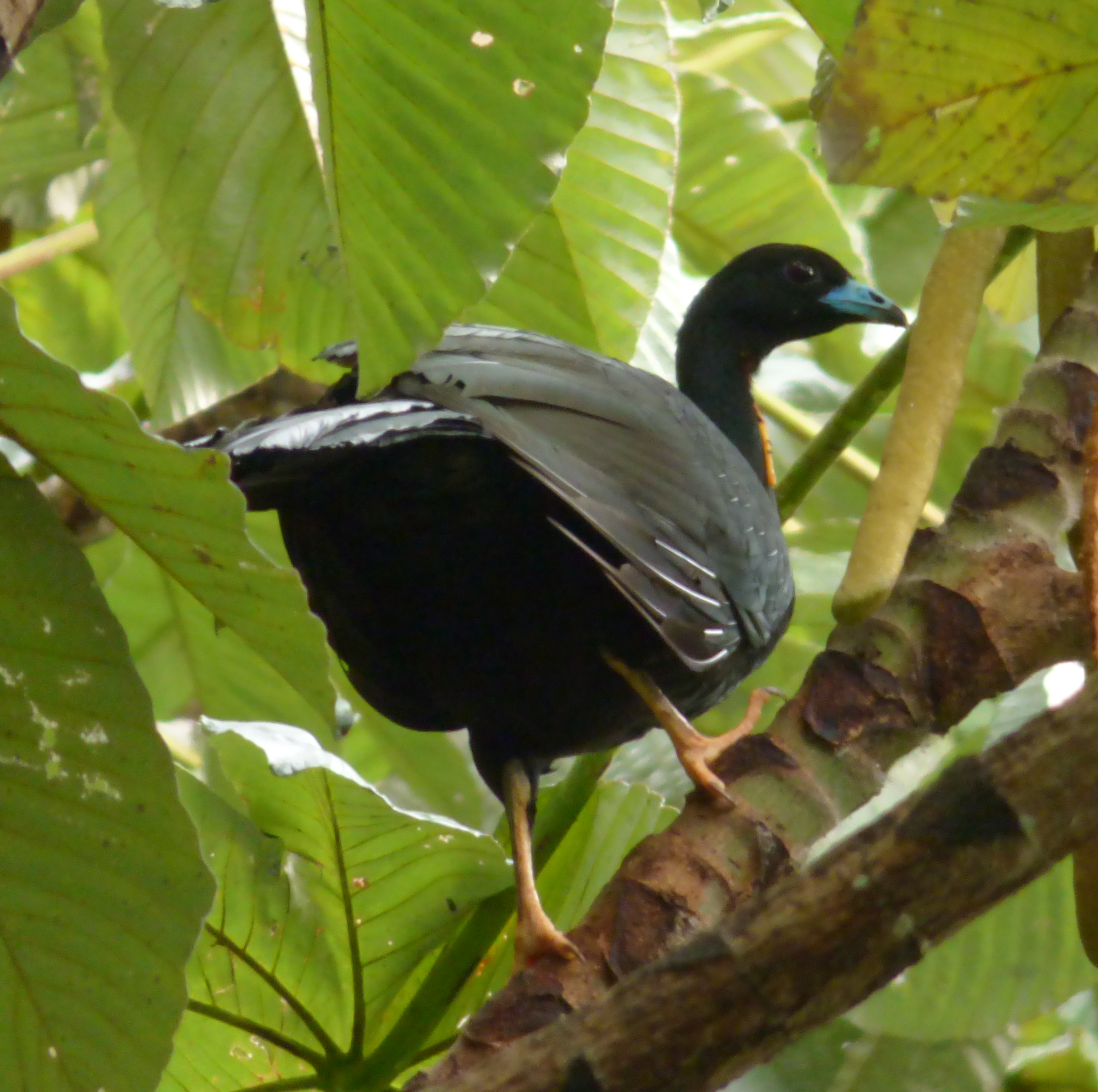

Conservation status
- Least Concern (IUCN 3.1)

Scientific classification
- Kingdom: Animalia
- Phylum: Chordata
- Class: Aves
- Order: Galliformes
- Family: Cracidae
- Genus: Aburria; Reichenbach, 1853
- Species: A. aburri

Binomial name
- Aburria aburri (Lesson, 1828)

Audio

= Wattled guan =

Species of bird

The wattled guan (Aburria aburri) is a species of bird in the family Cracidae. It is a fairly large black cracid with blue-based, black-tipped beak and a long, red-and-yellow wattle.

It is found in Colombia, Ecuador, Peru, and Venezuela. Its natural habitats are subtropical or tropical moist lowland forest and subtropical or tropical moist montane forest. The wattled guan is a fairly shy species that is mostly seen when it perches on the outer edge of the canopy from a distance. Like many tropical forest birds, it is heard more often than seen. It is threatened by habitat destruction but the IUCN assessed its conservation status as being "Least Concern" in 2023, though it was previously classified as "Near Threatened" since 2000.

== Description ==
The wattled guan is recognisable by the elongated red and yellow fleshy wattle that dangles from its throat. It is a large bird with a long tail, about 75 centimetres (30 in) long and weighing between 1,200 and 1,550 grams (42 and 55 oz). The plumage is black, the beak is blue and the feet are flesh-coloured.

== Distribution and habitat ==
The wattled guan is endemic to the foothills of the Andes in South America. Its range extends from northwestern Venezuela through Colombia, Ecuador and Bolivia to southern Peru. It used to be found on the western slopes of the Andes but this is believed no longer to be the case. On the eastern slopes it is rare in Venezuela but slightly more common in Colombia. Its natural habitat is wet mountain forest and woodland verges, and it also occurs in secondary forest. Its altitudinal range is 500 to 2,500 metres (1,600 to 8,200 ft).
