= Shahpuri dialect =

Dialect of Punjabi

Shahpuri
- شاہپوری
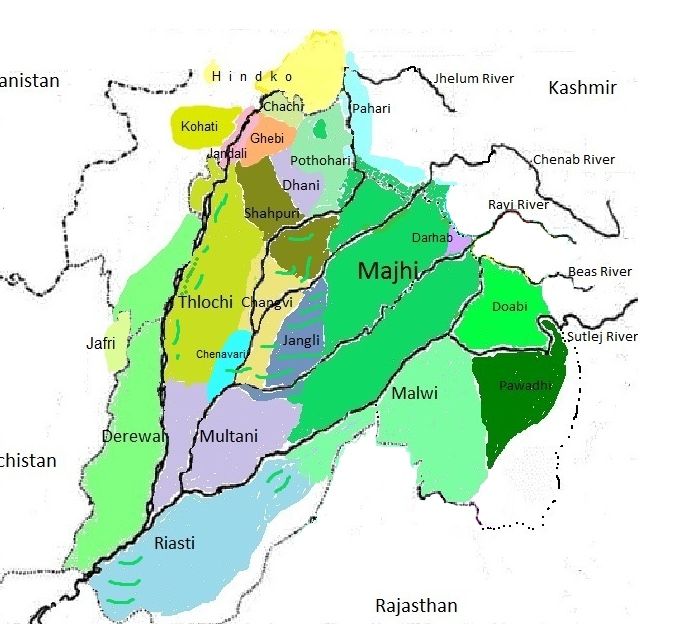
- Khalid Mahmood's map of Punjabi dialects
- Pronunciation: [ʃaː(ɦ)pʊɾi]
- Native to: Pakistan
- Region: Sargodha Division, Punjab
- Ethnicity: Punjabis
- Language family: Indo-European: Indo-Iranian; Indo-Aryan; Northwestern; Punjabi; Shahpuri
- Writing system: Shahmukhi

Language codes
- ISO 639-3: –
- Glottolog: shah1266

Shahpuri (شاہپوری; pronounced [ʃaː(ɦ)pʊɾi]) is a western dialect of Punjabi, primarily spoken in the former Shahpur District in what are now Sargodha and Khushab districts.

== Geographic distribution and classification ==
Its name is derived from the former Shahpur District. Grierson (1919) considered Shahpuri to be representative of Lahnda (Western Punjabi), but later opinions by Shackle (1976) and Masica (1991) have re-classified it as a general dialect of Punjabi, with certain Multani dialect features. Wagha (1997) rejects the validity of Shahpuri as a distinct linguistic entity, and instead suggests all the intermediate dialects spoken in the Bars from Sargodha to Pakpattan, including Jhangi, to be merged into one.

It is mostly spoken in Sargodha District and Khushab District. It is also spoken in the neighbouring districts of Jhang, Chiniot, Mandi Bahauddin, Khanewal, Sahiwal and Bhakkar. It is mainly spoken on western end of Sindh River to Chenab River, traversing the Jhelum River.

Jatki dialect is a common name for the Jhangvi dialect, Shahpuri dialect and Dhani dialect. Sometimes also termed as Rachnavi dialect, the glotlog codes for these are:

- shah1266
- jatk1238
- jang1253
- dhan1272

== Notable Features ==
In its phonology Shahpuri has the same tonal pattern as Standard Punjabi.

In common with Thali and Hindko, there is a class of two-syllable nouns that mark case distinctions by vowel alternation. The case suffixes of the older language have dropped, leaving the assimilated root vowels as the only indicator of the case: /jʌŋɡʊl/ ~ /jʌŋɡəl/ /jʌŋɡɪl/. Grierson explains this by substratal Dardic influence, whereas Shackle (1979) finds it more plausible that it is the result of Shahpuri's central position between areas favouring one or another vowel in these contexts.

== Grammar ==
=== Continuous Tense ===
Like most Punjabi dialects, Shahpuri also uses the past-tense inflections of paiṇā (peyā, paī, paye, paiyā̃) to signify the continuous tense.

| English | Jatki | | |
| English | Transliteration | Shahmukhi | Gurmukhi |
|---|---|---|---|
| I am doing | Mãi karda pya aan Mãi kareynda pya aan | میں کردا پیا آں میں کریندا پیا آں | ਮੈਂ ਕਰਦਾ ਪਿਆ ਆਂ ਮੈਂ ਕਰੇਂਦਾ ਪਿਆ ਆਂ |
| We are doing | Asī̃ karday paye haen Asī̃ kareynday paye haen ("aan" may also be used) | اسِیں کردے پئے ہائیں اسِیں کریندے پئے ہائیں | ਅਸੀਂ ਕਰਦੇ ਪਏ ਹਾਏਂ ਅਸੀਂ ਕਰੇਂਦੇ ਪਏ ਹਾਏਂ |
| You are doing (sing, m.) | Tū̃ karda pya ain Tū̃ kareynda pya ain | تُوں کردا پیا ایں تُوں کریندا پیا ایں | ਤੂੰ ਕਰਦਾ ਪਿਆ ਐਂ ਤੂੰ ਕਰੇਂਦਾ ਪਿਆ ਐਂ |
| You are doing (sing, f.) | Tū̃ kardi pyi ain Tū̃ kareyndi pyi ain | تُوں کردی پئی ایں تُوں کریندی پئی ایں | ਤੂੰ ਕਰਦੀ ਪਈ ਐਂ ਤੂੰ ਕਰੇਂਦੀ ਪਈ ਐਂ |
| You are doing (plural) | Tusī̃ karday paye o Tusī̃ kareynday paye o | تُسِیں کردے پئے او تُسِیں کردے پئے او | ਤੁਸੀਂ ਕਰਦੇ ਪਏ ਓ ਤੁਸੀਂ ਕਰੇਂਦੇ ਪਏ ਓ |
| He is doing | Ó karda pya ae Ó kareynda pya ae | اوہ کردا پیا اے اوہ کریندا پیا اے | ਉਹ ਕਰਦਾ ਪਿਆ ਐ ਉਹ ਕਰੇਂਦਾ ਪਿਆ ਐ |
| She is doing | Ó kardi pyi ae Ó kareyndi pyi ae | اوہ کردی پِئی اے اوہ کریندی پِئی اے | ਉਹ ਕਰਦੀ ਪਈ ਐ ਉਹ ਕਰੇਂਦੀ ਪਈ ਐ |
| They are doing (m.) | Ó karday paye no Ó kareynday paye hin | اوہ کردے پئے نوں اوہ کریندے پئے ہِن | ਉਹ ਕਰਦੇ ਪਏ ਉਹ ਕਰੇਂਦੇ ਪਏ |
| They are doing (f.) | Ó kardiyan pyian no Ó kareyndiyan pyian hin | اوہ کردِیاں پئِیاں نوں اوہ کردِیاں پئِیاں ہِن | ਉਹ ਕਰਦੀਆਂ ਪਈਆਂ ਨੋਂ ਉਹ ਕਰੇਂਦੀਆਂ ਪਈਆਂ ਹਿਨ |

The place of "pyā" may sometimes be switched with respect to the verb.

"Tusī̃ bahoon changā kamm paye karenday o", meaning "You (plural) are doing a very good thing"

"Tū̃ bahoon changā kamm krendā ain pyā", meaning "You (sing, m) are doing a very good thing"

"Sāḍā hāl kehṛā puchhdā ãi, mar mar ke paye aan jeenday, meaning "What do you ask about us? We are living in great distress" (a song by Mansoor Malangi)

"Paye aapna vanjeynday visaah o", meaning "You are wasting the trust people have in you" (from "Tusi changean naseeban de shah")

"Eh dohven aape vich larde hin paye". meaning "These two are fighting amongst themselves"

"Ethay seklaan pyiaan vikkdiyaan hin" or "Ethay seklaan vikkdiyaan ne pyiaan", meaning "Bicycles are being sold here"

=== Future Tense ===
The future tense in Jatki Punjabi is formed by adding -s as opposed to the Eastern Punjabi gā.

This tense is also utilized in Pothwari, Hindko, Saraiki and other Western Punjabi dialects.

| English | Jatki | | |
| English | Transliteration | Shahmukhi | Gurmukhi |
|---|---|---|---|
| I will do | Mãi karsā̃ Mãi kareysā̃ | میں کرساں میں کریساں | ਮੈਂ ਕਰਸਾਂ ਮੈਂ ਕਰੇਸਾਂ |
| We will do | Asī̃ karsā̃ / Asī̃ karsā̃e Asī̃ kareysā̃ / Asī̃ kareysā̃e | اسِیں کرساں / اسِیں کرسائیں اسِیں کریساں / اسِیں کریسائیں | ਅਸੀਂ ਕਰਸਾਂ / ਅਸੀਂ ਕਰਸਾਏਂ ਅਸੀਂ ਕਰੇਸਾਂ / ਅਸੀਂ ਕਰੇਸਾਏਂ |
| You will do (singular) | Tū̃ karsãi Tū̃ kareysãi | تُوں کرسیں تُوں کریسیں | ਤੂੰ ਕਰਸੈਂ ਤੂੰ ਕਰੇਸੈਂ |
| You will do (plural) | Tusī̃ karso Tusī̃ kareyso | تُسِیں کرسو تُسِیں کریسو | ਤੁਸੀਂ ਕਰਸੋ ਤੁਸੀਂ ਕਰੇਸੋ |
| He/She will do | Ó karsi Ó kaeyrsi | اوہ کرسی اوہ کریسی | ਓਹ ਕਰਸੀ ਓਹ ਕਰੇਸੀ |
| They will do | Ó karsan Ó kareysan | اوہ کرسن اوہ کریسن | ਓਹ ਕਰਸਨ ਓਹ ਕਰੇਸਨ |

=== Past Tense ===
The past tense in the Jatki dialects differs from that of Eastern Punjabi.

| English | Jatki | | Pothohari | Majhi |
| English | Shahpuri/Jhangochi | Dhanni | Pothohari | Majhi |
|---|---|---|---|---|
| I was doing | میں کریندا پیا ہمُوں (جھنگوچی) میں کردا پیا ہاسُو (شاہپُوری) ਮੈਂ ਕਰੇਂਦਾ ਪਿਆ ਹਮੂੰ (ਝੰਗਵੀ) ਮੈਂ ਕਰਦਾ ਪਿਆ ਹਾਸੂ (ਸ਼ਾਹਪੂਰੀ) | میں کریندا پیا اوس ਮੈਂ ਕਰੇਂਦਾ ਪਿਆ ਓਸ | میں کرنا پیا ساں ਮੈਂ ਕਰਨਾ ਪਿਆ ਸਾਂ | میں کردا پیا ساں ਮੈਂ ਕਰਦਾ ਪਿਆ ਸਾਂ |
| We were doing | اسِیں کریندے/کردے پئے ہاسے ਅਸੀਂ ਕਰਦੇ/ਕਰੇਂਦੇ ਪਏ ਹਾਸੇ | اسِیں کریندے پئے اوس ਅਸੀਂ ਕਰੇਂਦੇ ਪਏ ਓਸ | اساں کرنے پئے سیاں اساں کرنے پئے ساں ਅਸਾਂ ਕਰਨੇ ਪਏ ਸਿਆਂ/ਸਾਂ | اسِیں کردے پئے ساں ਅਸੀਂ ਕਰਦੇ ਪਏ ਸਾਂ |
| You were doing (sing.) | تُوں کردا/کردیندا پیا ہائیں ਤੂੰ ਕਰਦਾ/ਕਰੇਂਦਾ ਪਿਆ ਹਾਏਂ | تُوں کریندا پیا ایاں ਤੂੰ ਕਰੇਂਦਾ ਪਿਆ ਅਇਆਂ | تُوں کرنا پیا سَیں ਤੂੰ ਕਰਨਾ ਪਿਆ ਸੈਂ | تُوں کردا پیا سیں ਤੂੰ ਕਰਦਾ ਪਿਆ ਸੈਂ |
| You were doing (pl.) | تُسِیں کردے/کریندے پئے ہائے (جھنگوچی) تُسِیں کردے/کریندے پئے ہاؤ (شاہپُوری) ਤੁਸੀਂ ਕਰਦੇ/ਕਰੇਂਦੇ ਪਏ ਹਾਏ (ਝੰਗਵੀ) ਤੁਸੀਂ ਕਰਦੇ/ਕਰੇਂਦੇ ਪਏ ਹਾਓ (ਸ਼ਾਹਪੂਰੀ) | تُسِیں کریندے پئے اَو ਤੁਸੀਂ ਕਰੇਂਦੇ ਪਏ ਆਓ | تُساں کرنے پئے سیو تُساں کرنے پِئے سو ਤੁਸਾਂ ਕਰਨੇ ਪਏ ਸਿਓ/ਸੋ | تُسِیں کردے پئے سو ਤੁਸੀਂ ਕਰਦੇ ਪਏ ਸੋ |
| He was doing | اوہ کردا/کریندا پیا ہا ਉਹ ਕਰਦਾ/ਕਰੇਂਦਾ ਪਿਆ ਹਾ | اوہ کریندا پیا آیا ਉਹ ਕਰੇਂਦਾ ਪਿਆ ਆਇਆ | اوہ کرنا پیا سا اوہ کرنا پیا سی ਉਹ ਕਰਨਾ ਪਿਆ ਸਾ/ਸੀ | اوہ کردا پیا سی ਉਹ ਕਰਦਾ ਪਿਆ ਸੀ |
| She was doing | اوہ کردی/کریندی پئی ہائی ਉਹ ਕਰਦੀ/ਕਰੇਂਦੀ ਪਈ ਹਾਈ | اوہ کریندی پئی آئی ਉਹ ਕਰੇਂਦੀ ਪਈ ਆਈ | اوہ کرنی پئی سی ਉਹ ਕਰਨੀ ਪਈ ਸੀ | اوہ کردی پئی سی ਉਹ ਕਰਦੀ ਪਈ ਸੀ |
| They were doing (m.) | اوہ کردے/کریندے پئے ہان ਉਹ ਕਰਦੇ/ਕਰੇਂਦੇ ਪਏ ਹਾਨ | اوہ کریندے پئے آہے ਉਹ ਕਰਦੇ/ਕਰੇਂਦੇ ਪਏ ਆਏ | اوہ کرنے پئے سے اوہ کرنے پئے سن ਉਹ ਕਰਨੇ ਪਏ ਸੇ/ਸਨ | اوہ کردے پئے سن ਉਹ ਕਰਦੇ ਪਏ ਸਨ |
| They were doing (f.) | اوہ کردِیاں/کریندِیاں پئیاں ہان ਉਹ ਕਰਦੀਆਂ/ਕਰੇਂਦੀਆਂ ਪਈਆਂ ਹਾਨ | اوہ کریندِیاں پئیاں آئیاں ਉਹ ਕਰੇਂਦੀਆਂ ਪਈਆਂ ਆਈਆਂ | اوہ کرنِیاں پئیاں سِیاں اوہ کرنِیاں پئیاں سن ਉਹ ਕਰਨੀਆਂ ਪਈਆਂ ਸੀਆਂ/ਸਨ | اوہ کردِیاں پئیاں سن ਉਹ ਕਰਦੀਆਂ ਪਈਆਂ ਸਨ |

=== Present Tense ===
The present tense of non-causative verbs in Jatki may involve the addition of -eyndā, while causative verbs may attain either -eyndā or -āandā. The future tense changes accordingly.

Verbs that have a causative form, rarely acquire -eyndā, for example, Mardā (dies) cannot become Mareyndā (kills/hits) as that is the present form of Maarnā (killing/hitting).

However, Mannnā (to be convinced) and Mannāvnā (to convince) both can be said as Maneyndā in the present form.

Verbs like āvan (to come) and lyāvan (to bring) will not take -eyndā, as they lack a passive form, so they are either said as -āndā or -aundā

| English | Jatki Punjabi | | |
| English | Present | Future | Present Passive |
|---|---|---|---|
| Dividing | Vanḍeyndā / Vanḍdā | Vanḍeysi / Vanḍdsi | Vanḍeendā |
| Doing | Kareyndā / Kardā | Kareysi / Karsi | Kareendā |
| Throwing | Saṭṭeyndā / Saṭṭdā | Saṭṭeysi / Saṭṭsi | Saṭṭeendā |
| Removing | Kaḍḍheyndā / Kaḍḍhdā | Kaḍḍheysi / Kaḍḍhsi | Kaḍḍheendā |
| Scattering | Ruleyndā / Roldā | Ruleysi / Rolsi | Roleendā |
| To be making one cry | Ruveyndā / Ruvaandā | Ruveysi / Ruvaasi | Ruvāveedā |
| To feed | Khaveyndā / Khavaandā | Khaveysi / Khavaasi | Khaveendā |
| Beating | Mareyndā / Maardā | Mareysi / Maarsi | Mareendā/Māreendā |
| Moving | Ṭureyndā / Ṭordā | Ṭureysi / Ṭorsi | Ṭureendā |
| Using | Varteyndā / Vartdā | Varteysi / Vartsi | Varteendā |
| Cutting | Kapeyndā / Kappdā | Kapeysi / Kappsi | Kapeendā |
| Chopping | Vaḍḍheyndā / Vaḍḍhdā | Vaḍḍheysi/ Vaḍḍhsi | Vaḍḍheendā |
| To be making one understand | Samjheyndā / Samjhaandā | Samjheysi / Samjhaasi | Samjhaaveedā |
| Raising/Lifting | Cheyndā / Chaandā | Cheysi / Chaasi | Chaveendā |
| Putting/Pouring/Adding | Peyndā / Paandā | Peysi / Paasi | Paveendā |
| Bringing | Aaṅdā / Aṅeydā | Aaṅsi / Aṅeysi | Aaṅeā veyndā |
| Being | Hondā | Hosi | Hoveendā |
| Giving | Deyndā | Deysi | Deyveendā (is given) Ḍheendā (is obtained) |
| Calls | Sadd'da / Sadeynda | Sadeysi | Sadeenda |

The progressive tense is built upon the present tense, and is used in all Punjabi dialects. It is made by ending the verb with -eān in the present form.

For example, "to be doing" or "while doing", can be either kardeān or kareyndeān.

=== Passive Tense ===
The Jatki dialects have a special passive tense for most verbs.

The present passive is made by adding -eendā, past passive by adding -eevyā/eeyā, subjunctive by adding -eevay (s.) and -eevan (pl), progressive by adding -eendeān, gerundive passive by adding -eevna/eejna and future passive by adding -eesi. The continuous passive is built upon the present passive by adding pyā, while perfect passive is built by adding gyā to the past passive.

Varteendā (is used), Varteenday (are used), Varteevay/Varteejay (to be used, sing), Varteevan/Varteejan (to be used, pl), Varteevyā (was used), Vartee-gyā (has been used), Varteenda-pyā (is being used), Varteendeān (while being used), Varteevna/Varteejna (its "being used"), Varteesi (will be used), Vartee-veysi or Vartee-jaasi (will have been used/will end up being used), Vartee-veynda or Vartee-jaanda (gets used).

Note: The past passive in Shahpuri is made by adding -eevyā, in Jhangochi by adding -eeyaā, Dhani is made by adding -eetā, and in Thalochi it is made by adding -eechā.

| Active | | Passive | |
| English | Jatki Punjabi | English | Jatki Punjabi |
|---|---|---|---|
| Is cutting | کٹّدا پیا اے / کٹیندا پیا اے ਕੱਟਦਾ ਪਿਆ ਐ / ਕਟੇੰਦਾ ਪਿਆ ਐ | Is being cut | کٹِیندا پیا اے ਕਟੀਂਦਾ ਪਿਆ ਐ |
| To cut | کٹّنا ਕੱਟਣਾ | To be cut | کٹِیوَنا / کٹِیجنا ਕਟੀਵਣਾ / ਕਟੀਜਣਾ |
| If he cuts | جے اوہ کٹّے ਜੇ ਉਹ ਕੱਟੇ | If it is cut | جے اوہ کٹِیوے/کٹِیجے ਜੇ ਉਹ ਕਟੀਵੇ/ਕਟੀਜੇ |
| Shall I cut? | میں کٹّاں؟ ਮੈਂ ਕੱਟਾਂ? | Shall I be cut? | میں کٹِیواں/کٹِیجاں؟ ਮੈਂ ਕਟੀਵਾਂ? |
| Will cut (sing.) | کٹّسی / کٹیسی ਕੱਟਸੀ / ਕਟੇਸੀ | Will be cut (sing.) | کٹِیسی ਕੱਟੀਸੀ |
| He cut it | اُس کٹیا ਉਸ ਕੱਟਿਆ | Was cut by him | اوہندے کولُوں کٹِیا (کٹی آ) / کٹِیجا ਓਂਹਦੇ ਕੋਲੂੰ ਕਟੀਆ/ਕਟੀਜਾ |
| I will beat | میں مارساں / میں مریساں ਮੈਂ ਮਾਰਸਾਂ / ਮੈਂ ਮਰੇਸਾਂ | I will be beaten | میں مرِیساں ਮੈਂ ਮਰੀਸਾਂ |
| I did not hear | میں سُنیا نہیں ਮੈਂ ਸੁਣਿਆ ਨਹੀਂ | Was not heard by me | مینُوں سُنِیجا نہیں ਮੈਨੂੰ ਸੁਣੀਜਾ ਨਹੀਂ |
| Let him use first | اوہ پہلوں ورتے تاں سہی ਉਹ ਪਹਿਲੋਂ ਵਰਤੇ ਤਾਂ ਸਹੀ | Let it be used first | اوہ پہلوں ورتِیوے تاں سہی ਉਹ ਪਹਿਲੋਂ ਵਰਤੀਵੇ ਤਾਂ ਸਹੀ |
| Uses | ورتدا / ورتیندا ਵਰਤਦਾ/ਵਰਤੇਂਦ | Under use | ورتِیندا ਵਰਤੀਂਦਾ |
| Does not give | نہیں دیندا ਨਹੀਂ ਦੇਂਦਾ | Is not to be given | نہیں دیوِیندا / نہیں دیوی دا ਨਹੀਂ ਦੇਵੀਂਦਾ/ਨਹੀਂ ਦੇਵੀਦਾ |
| Does not give | نہیں دیندا ਨਹੀਂ ਦੇਂਦਾ | Is not obtained | نہیں ڈھِیندا ਨਹੀਂ ਢੀਂਦਾ |
| They (f.) uproot it | اوہ پٹّدِیاں نو / اوہ پٹیندِیاں ہِن ਉਹ ਪੱਟਦੀਆਂ ਨੋਂ ਉਹ ਪਟੇਂਦੀਆਂ ਹਿਨ | They (f.) are to be uprooted | او اجے پٹِیونِیاں نو ਉਹ ਅਜੇ ਪਟੀਵਣੀਆਂ ਨੋਂ |
| Friends do not agree | سنگّی نہیں منّدے/منیندے ਸੰਗੀ ਨਹੀਂ ਮੰਨਦੇ/ਮਨੇਂਦੇ | Friends cannot be convinced | سنگّی نہیں منِیندے ਸੰਗੀ ਨਹੀਂ ਮੰਨੀਂਦੇ |
| He came and chopped it | اوہ وڈھّ گیا ਉਹ ਵੱਢ ਗਿਆ | It was chopped | اوہ وڈھی گیا / وڈھِیج گیا ਉਹ ਵੱਢੀ/ਵੱਢੀਜ ਗਿਆ |
| He catches | اوہ پھڑدا اے ਉਹ ਫੜਦਾ ਐ | They were caught | اوہ پھڑی/پھڑِیج گئے ਉਹ ਫੜੀ/ਫੜੀਜ ਗਏ |
| I am not reading | میں پڑھدا نہیں پیا ਮੈਂ ਪੜ੍ਹਦਾ ਨਹੀਂ ਪਿਆ | It is not being read by me (I cannot understand it) | میتھُوں پڑھِیندا نہیں پیا ਮੈਥੂੰ ਪੜ੍ਹੀਂਦਾ ਨਹੀਂ ਪਿਆ |
| When will he use? | کدوں ورتسی/ورتیسی؟ ਕਦੋਂ ਵਰਤਸੀ/ਵਰਤੇਸੀ? | When will it be used? | کدوں ورتِیسی؟ ਕਦੋਂ ਵਰਤੀਸੀ? |
| He wil come and use it tomorrow | کلّ ورت ویسی ਕੱਲ੍ਹ ਵਰਤ ਵੇਸੀ | It will end up being used tomorrow | کلّ ورتی ویسی ਕੱਲ੍ਹ ਵਰਤੀ ਵੇਸੀ |
| He is not eating or driking | اوہ کُجھ کھاندا پِیندا نہیں پیا ਓਹ ਕੁਝ ਖਾਂਦਾ ਪੀਂਦਾ ਨਹੀਂ ਪਿਆ | Nothing is being eaten or drunk by him | اوہندے کولُوں کُجھ وی کھوِیندا پِوِیندا نہیں پیا ਓਂਹਦੇ ਕੋਲੂੰ ਕੁਝ ਵੀ ਖਵੀਂਦਾ ਪਵੀਂਦਾ ਨਹੀਂ ਪਿਆ |
| To forgive | بخشنا ਬਸ਼ਣਾ | To be forgiven | بخشِیوݨا ਬਖ਼ਸ਼ੀਵਣਾ |

Some verbs may attain this form without any change in usage or meaning, such as:

ਬਵ੍ਹਣਾ ਉਠੀਵਣਾ / بہوَنا اُٹھِیونا, being the same as ਉੱਠਣਾ / اُٹھّنا

ਦਿਸੀਂਦਾ / دِسِیندا, being the same as ਦਿੱਸਦਾ / دِسّدا

Proverb example: Heṭṭhon utton vaḍḍheeveeye taan ḍakk sadeendaa (ہیٹھوں اُتّوں وڈھِیوِیئے تاں ڈکّ سدِیندا)

(If we are cut from top to bottom, then are to be called a cane)

Note: The past tense of Marnā is Moyā (dead) and the past passive tense is Mareejā (killed)

=== Agentive Tense ===
The agentive tense of verb in Punjabi is either shown in the standard manner by adding the words "āalā" or "laggeā".

For example, "He is to come" or "He is about to come" is spoken as Oh aavan aalā/laggeā ae.

In Jatki, another manner exists where the root verb is suffixated by adding -oo

Examples:

Tun kitthay jaaoo/vanjoo ain? (Where are you to go?)

Oh kay karoo ae? (What is he up to)

Ajj mein tuhānu hik ehjihi gall sunāoo aan (Today I am about to tell you such a thing...)

Tuseen ohnu deoo o ke menu deoo o? (You are to give him or me?)

Ghaabarda kyon pya ain? Saanu vi miloo ae (Why are you worried? We too are to get it)

== Vocabulary ==
=== Present Plural Marker ===
The dialects of Jatki Punjabi use Hin (ہِن) or No (نو) to signify the present plural tense. These are dialectal forms of "Han" (ہَن) and "Ne" (نے) respectively.

"Do janey hin/no" (دو جنے ہِن/نو), meaning "There are two people".

The word "hin" may be attached with the verb colloquially.

"Oh menū̃ dassdin" (اوہ مینُوں دسّدِن), meaning "They tell me".

"Bahū̃ vādey keetin" (بہُوں وعدے کِیتِن)، meaning "Made many promises"

The word Heņ (ہَیڻ) may also be used.

=== Words for "Then/Again" ===
Words like Vatt (وتّ) or Muṛ (مُڑ) and its variant pronunciation Munṛ (مُنڑ) are used instead of the Standard Punjabi Phir (پھیر).

"Halā vatt ki hoya?" (ہلا وتّ کی ہویا؟), meaning "Alright, what happened then?".

"Tenu vatt vii aas praai rahi" (تَینُوں وتّ وی آس پرائی رہی), meaning "Even then, you had hopes for some other", a lyric from "Changean Naseeban de Shah", by Talib Hussain Dard

=== Words for "Going" ===
Words like Vaj̈aṇ (ونجن) and Jāwaṇ (جاوَن) are both used.

"Kithay vendā/jāndā pyā ain?" (کِتھّے ویندا/جاندا پیا ایں؟), meaning "Where are you going?"

=== Words for "Someone" and "What" ===
For "what", Jatki either uses the common word Kii (کی) or the Western word Kay (کے)

For "someone", Jatki may use either the standard Kisay (کِسے) or another word that is Kaheeṇ (کہِیں)

=== Words for "That" ===
Ba, Bai or Jo are used, as opposed to ke in Standard Punjabi. (بہ، بئی، جو)

Mein tuhaanu dassaan bai (ke) aes ton changga mein pehlon kaday nhi vekhya

(Let me tell you that I have never seen one better than this)

Kaday vi mein nahi aakhya jo (ke) tun menu kujh desein taahin mein tenu kujh desaan

(Never did I say that you must first give only then to receive from me)

Tuseen inj keeta karo ba (ke) menu dass ditta karo

(You should do it as such that you should inform me)

Menu pata ae ba (ke) khoon rattaa ae, tey hetna rattaa ae jo (ke) teray hatthaan tey mehndi lagsi

(I know that blood is red, and it is so much that it will look like henna on your hands)

Similarly, Kyunjo (or Kyunjay) is used for Kyunke, and Taanjo (or Taanjay) is used for Taake.

=== Supporting Verbs ===
In Jatki, many verbs exist to support the adjoining verb, giving the same meaning as de/dittaa/devay/desi.

De chaa (دے چا), is the same as De de (دے دے), meaning "Give it"

Rakkh chhaḍḍ (رکھّ چھڈّ), is the same as Rakkh de (رکھّ دے), meaning "Place it"

Chaa karay (چا کرے), is the same as Kar devay (کر دیوے), meaning "Someone do it"

Other examples:

Chaa keetaa (چا کیتا), meaning "Done it"

Mukaa chhoryaa (مُکا چھوڑیا), meaning "Finished it"

Pivaa chaa (پِوا چا), meaning "Get me (something) to drink"

Laah satto (لاہ سٹّو), meaning "Remove it"

Bhann sattyaa (بھنّ سٹّیا), meaning "Broke it"

Hun dass vi chhaḍḍo (ہُن دسّ وی چھڈّو), meaning "Now tell already"

Koi ghatt chhaḍḍay (کوئی گھتّ چھڈّے), meaning "Someone come and pour it"

Mein ohnu de chhaḍḍsaan (میں اوہنُوں دے چھڈّساں), meaning "I will give him"

Maar ghattsan (مار گھتّسن), meaning "Will come and beat"

=== The verb "Vattnā" ===
In its past form Vadā, it can either show continuous action (like pyā) or a state of being (like hoyā), depending on the main verb's form.

In the latter case, Khalā and Khlotā (both meaning "standing") may also be used.

Menu bhukkh laggi vadi/khali/pyi ae (I have hunger)

Menu bhukkh laggdi vadi/pyi ae (I am getting hungry)

Oh chendā vadā/pyā ae (He is picking it up)

Oh chaai vadā/khalā ae (He has it picked up)

Ukkā moye vaday āen (We are completely dead)

Oh khādhi khalā hosi (He must have eaten)

Ohnu treh laggi vadi/khloti ae (He has thirst)

Mein kamm mukaai vadā/khalā/khlotā aa'n (I have finished the work)

Mein dhammi da progam keeti khalā/vadā/khlotā/pyā aa'n (I have decided it for morning)

Rujjhay vaday o, naveān saangeān vich (You are busy in your new attachments, a lyric from "Tusi Changean Naseeban de Shah", a song by Talib Hussain Dard)

In other forms, the verb Vattnā, (literally meaning "to wander") depicts a continuity in an action, and is synonymous with the word Phirnā.

Hyaati saari nassdyān vattnā/phirnā (Running for all life)

Oh tenu kay kujh ghalldā vattdā/phirdā ee? (What does he keep on sending you?)

Beyli ruṭṭhā vadā hove tey aseen jeende vateeye/phireeye? (The friend is unhappy and we are to keep on living?)

Mein injay tue'n magar laggya vattaa'n/phiraa'n? (I should stay after you for no reason?)

=== Personal Pronouns ===
Jatki uses special personal pronouns such as Kãi (Kihne/Kis), and Jãi (Jihne/Jis).

Kãi aakhya? کَیں آکھیا؟, meaning "Says who?"

Jãi vii aakhya hovay جَیں وی آکھیا ہووے, meaning "Whomsoever might have said it"

Eh kãinda ghar ae? ایہہ کَیندا گھر اے؟, meaning "Whose house is this?"

Kãi kãi janay eh aali kheyḍ kheyḍi ee?, کیں کیں جنڑے ایہہ آلی کھیڈ کھیڈی ہئی؟ meaning "Who has played this game?"

Jãi kahen vii karna hovay جَیں کہیں وی کرنا ہووے or Jis kisay vii karna hovay جِس کِسے وی کرنا ہووے, meaning "Whomsoever wants to do"

Jainda vii mann kareynda or Jain kahen da vii mann kareynda

=== Pronominal Affixes ===
Eh ki keetum (What have I done?)

Eh ki keeto-ee (What have you done?)

Eh ki keeta-nhay (What have you done? plural/respect)

Eh ki keeta-nay (What have they done?)

Eh ki keeto-say (What have we done?)

Eh ki keetus (What has he done?)

Kii naa'n-us? (What is his name?)

Nisay keeta (We did not do)

Nimoo keeta (I did not do)

Tenu aakhyam (I have told you)

Bhiraa nisay? (Are we not brothers?)

Jehri naveen film kaddhi nay, ḍiṭṭhi hayi? (The new film they released, have you seen it?)

Punjabi aapni dhi nu sikhaai koi nhoo'n? (You did not teach your daughter Punjabi?)

Bhalla honay (respectfully, "Thank you")

Bhalla hovi (Thankh you)

=== Counting ===
Counting is generally the same throughout Punjabi dialects, but with some notable deviations being:

| English | | Jatki Punjabi | | Standard Punjabi | |
| Numbers | Numerals | Transliteration | Shahmukhi | Transliteration | Shahmukhi |
|---|---|---|---|---|---|
| One | 1 | Hikk | ہِکّ | Ikk | اِکّ |
| Three | 3 | Trae | ترَے | Tinn | تِنّ |
| Ten | 10 | Dāh | داہ | Das | دس |
| Eleven | 11 | Yārā̃ | یاراں | Gyārā̃ | گیاراں |
| Twenty three | 23 | Trei | ترئی | Tei | تئی |
| Twenty four | 24 | Chavvhi | چوّھی | Chauvi | چَووی |
| Twenty five | 25 | Panji | پنجی | Pachchi | پچّی |
| Thirty | 30 | Trih | ترِیہہ | Tih | تِیہہ |
| Forty four | 44 | Churtāli | چُرتالی | Chotaali | چوتالی |
| Forty six | 46 | Chhatāli | چھتالی | Chhiāli | چھیالی |
| Fifty six | 56 | Chhivanjā | چھِوَنجا | Chhapanjā | چھپنجا |
| Eighty five | 85 | Panjāsi | پنجاسی | Pachāsi | پچاسی |

Note:

- The counting used in Jhangochi, Shahpuri and Dhanni is almost the same as in Majhi and Pothohari with the main difference being the use of "**Dāh**" for 10 instead of **"Das"**.
- Standard Punjabi in the above table is more closer to the Malvai dialect (which also uses Biatāli instead of Batāli)

==== Oblique form ====
The numbers in their oblique form function the same throughout Punjabi dialects.

| English | Pothohari | Jhangochi | Majhi |
|---|---|---|---|
| I got it for forty-four | میں ایہہ چُرتالیاں نا آندا آ | میں ایہہ چُرتالیاں دا آندا اے | میں ایہہ چوتالیاں دا آندا آ |
| Above twenty-five or thirty | پنجِیاں ترِیہاں توں اپّر | پنجِیاں ترِیہاں توں اُتّے | پنجِیاں ترِیہاں توں اُتّے |
| After two or four days | دوَنہہ چَونہہ دیہاڑیاں بعد | دَونہہ چَونہہ دیہاڑیاں پِچھّوں | دَونہہ چَونہہ دیہاڑیاں پِچھّوں |
| At 8:46 | اٹھّ چھتالیاں اپّر | اٹھّ چھتالیاں تے | اٹھّ چھتالیاں تے |
| For almost five lac | پنجاں اِک لکھّاں نا | پنجاں اِک لکھّاں دا | پنجاں اِک لکھّاں دا |
| Nearing twenty | وِیہاں نے نیڑے | وِیہاں دے نیڑے | وِیہاں دے نیڑے |

=== General Vocabulary ===
Jatki dialects have several words that differ from Standard Punjabi.

| English | Jatki | | Standard Punjabi | |
| English | Shahmukhi | Gurmukhi | Shahmukhi | Gurmukhi |
|---|---|---|---|---|
| Many | بہُوں | ਬਹੂੰ | بہت | ਬਹੁਤ |
| Cried / To Cry | رُنّا، رووَنا | ਰੁੰਨਾ, ਰੋਵਣਾ | رویا، رونا | ਰੋਇਆ, ਰੋਣਾ |
| Happening | ہووَنا | ਹੋਵਣਾ | ہونا | ਹੋਣਾ |
| Lifting | چاوَنا | ਚਾਵਣਾ | چُکّنا | ਚੁੱਕਣਾ |
| Again/Then | وتّ / مُڑ | ਵੱਤ / ਮੁੜ | پھیر | ਫੇਰ |
| Wandering | وتّنا | ਵੱਤਣਾ | پھِرنا | ਫਿਰਨਾ |
| Day | دینْہہ | ਦੇਂਹ | دِن | ਦਿਨ |
| Quickly | ٹھَوہ / جھب | ਠਹੁ / ਝਬ | چھیتی | ਛੇਤੀ |
| More | چوکھا / گھنا | ਚੋਖਾ / ਘਣਾ | زیادہ | ਜ਼ਿਆਦਾ |
| To sleep | سَیں ونج | ਸੈਂ ਵੰਜ | سَوں جا | ਸੌਂ ਜਾ |
| Placing | پیا، پوَنا، پوندا، پوسی | ਪਿਆ, ਪਵਣਾ, ਪੋਂਦਾ, ਪੋਸੀ | پیا، پینا، پَیندا، پویگا | ਪਿਆ, ਪੈਣਾ, ਪੈਂਦਾ, ਪਵੇਗਾ |
| To lose | ونجاوَنا | ਵੰਞਾਵਣਾ | گواؤنا | ਗਵਾਉਣਾ |
| Going | ونج، ویندا، ویسی جا، جاندا، جاسی | ਵੰਜ, ਵੇਂਦਾ, ਵੇਸੀ ਜਾ, ਜਾਂਦਾ, ਜਾਸੀ | جا، جاندا، جاویگا | ਜਾ, ਜਾਂਦਾ, ਜਾਵੇਗਾ |
| Alright / Okay | ہلا | ਹਲਾ | اچھا | ਅੱਛਾ |
| Wife | سوانی، ٹبّری | ਸਵਾਣੀ, ਟੱਬਰੀ | زنانی | ਜ਼ਨਾਨੀ |
| Boy | چھوہَر / جاتک | ਛੋਹਰ / ਜਾਤਕ | مُنڈا | ਮੁੰਡਾ |
| Life | حیاتی | ਹਿਆਤੀ | زندگی | ਜ਼ਿੰਦਗੀ |
| To pull | چھِکّنا | ਛਿੱਕਣਾ | کھِچّنا | ਖਿੱਚਣਾ |
| To beat | ماردا / مریندا مارسی / مریسی | ਮਾਰਦਾ / ਮਰੇਂਦਾ ਮਾਰਸੀ / ਮਰੇਸੀ | ماردا، ماریگا | ਮਾਰਦਾ / ਮਾਰੇਗਾ |
| To cut | کپّنا / وڈھّنا | ਕੱਪਣਾ / ਵੱਢਣਾ | کٹّنا | ਕੱਟਣਾ |
| For | کاݨ / آسطے | ਕਾਣ / ਆਸਤੇ | لئی | ਲਈ |
| Due to | پارُوں | ਪਾਰੂੰ | کرکے / کارن | ਕਰਕੇ / ਕਾਰਨ |
| May | شالا | ਸ਼ਾਲਾ | رب کرے | ਰੱਬ ਕਰੇ |
| Lest | متاں | ਮਤਾਂ | کِتّے ایہہ نہ ہووے | ਕਿੱਤੇ ਇਹ ਨਾ ਹੋਵੇ |
| Friendship | سن٘گت | ਸੰਗਤ | دوستی | ਦੋਸਤੀ |

=== Words for "Taking" and "Bringing" ===
Commonly observed in the Lahnda dialects is the use of Ghinṇā (گھِننا) and Aaṇnā (آننا) instead of the Eastern Punjabi words Laiṇā (لَینا) and Lyāṇā (لیانا).

Jatki makes usage of both sets. The Dhani dialect however, seems to lean more towards the former.

| English | Jatki | | Pothohari | Hindko | Saraiki |
| English | Shahpuri/Jhangochi | Dhanni | Pothohari | Hindko | Saraiki |
|---|---|---|---|---|---|
| From tomorrow onwards, I'll also bring it for you, just cope for today. | کلّ توں میں تُہانُوں وی لیا دِتّا کرساں، اجّ گُزارہ کر لوو ਕੱਲ੍ਹ ਤੋਂ ਮੈਂ ਤੁਹਾਨੂੰ ਵੀ ਲਿਆ ਦਿੱਤਾ ਕਰਸਾਂ, ਅੱਜ ਗੁਜ਼ਾਰਾ ਕਰ ਲਵੋ | کلّ توں میں تُسانُوں وی آݨ دِتّا کریساں، اجّ گُزارہ کر گھِنو ਕੱਲ੍ਹ ਤੋਂ ਮੈਂ ਤੁਸਾਂ ਨੂੰ ਵੀ ਆਣ ਦਿੱਤਾ ਕਰੇਸਾਂ, ਅੱਜ ਗੁਜ਼ਾਰਾ ਕਰ ਘਿਨੋ | کلّ توں میں تُساں کی وی آݨی دیا کرساں، اجّ گُزارہ کری گھِنو ਕੱਲ੍ਹ ਤੋਂ ਮੈਂ ਤੁਸਾਂ ਕੀ ਵੀ ਆਣੀ ਦਿਆ ਕਰਸਾਂ, ਅੱਜ ਗੁਜ਼ਾਰਾ ਕਰੀ ਘਿਨੋ | کلّ توں میں تُساں آں وی آݨ دیا کرساں، اجّ گُزارہ کر گھِنو ਕੱਲ੍ਹ ਤੋਂ ਮੈਂ ਤੁਸਾਂ ਆਂ ਵੀ ਆਣ ਦਿਆ ਕਰਸਾਂ, ਅੱਜ ਗੁਜ਼ਾਰਾ ਕਰ ਘਿਨੋ | کلّ توں میں تُہاکُوں وی آݨ ڈِتّا کریساں، اجّ گُزارہ کر گھِنو ਕੱਲ੍ਹ ਤੋਂ ਮੈਂ ਤੁਹਾਕੂੰ ਵੀ ਆਣ ਡਿੱਤਾ ਕਰੇਸਾਂ, ਅੱਜ ਗੁਜ਼ਾਰਾ ਕਰ ਘਿਨੋ |
| Bring him along as well. | اوہنُوں وی نال لَے آوو ਓਹਨੂੰ ਵੀ ਨਾਲ ਲੈ ਆਵੋ | اوہنُوں وی نال گھِن آوو ਓਹਨੂੰ ਵੀ ਨਾਲ ਘਿਨ ਆਵੋ | اُسکی وی نال گھِنی اچھو ਉਸਕੀ ਵੀ ਨਾਲ ਘਿਨੀ ਅਛੋ | اُساں وی نال گھِن آؤ ਉਸਾਂ ਵੀ ਨਾਲ ਘਿਨ ਆਓ | اُوکُوں وی نال گھِن آوو ਊਕੂੰ ਵੀ ਨਾਲ ਘਿਨ ਆਵੋ |
| They took it from me as well | اُنھاں میرے کولُوں وی لَے لیا ਉਨ੍ਹਾਂ ਮੇਰੇ ਕੋਲੂੰ ਵੀ ਲੈ ਲਿਆ | اُنھاں مینڈھے کولُوں وی گھِن گھِدا ਉਨ੍ਹਾਂ ਮੈਂਢੇ ਕੋਲੂੰ ਵੀ ਘਿਨ ਘਿਦਾ | اُنھاں مہاڑے کولُوں وی گھِنی گھِدا ਉਨ੍ਹਾਂ ਮਹਾੜੇ ਕੋਲੂੰ ਵੀ ਘਿਨੀ ਘਿਦਾ | اُنھان مڑھے کولُوں وی گھِن گھِدا ਉਨ੍ਹਾਂ ਮੜ੍ਹੇ ਕੋਲੂੰ ਵੀ ਘਿਨ ਘਿਦਾ | اُنھاں میڈے کولُوں وی گھِن گھِدا ਉਨ੍ਹਾਂ ਮੈਂਡੇ ਕੋਲੂੰ ਵੀ ਘਿਨ ਘਿਦਾ |
| He is bringing | اوہ لیاندا پیا اے ਓਹ ਲਿਆਂਦਾ ਪਿਆ ਐ | اوہ اݨیدا پیا اے ਓਹ ਅਣੇਦਾ ਪਿਆ ਐ | اوہ آݨنا پیا اے ਓਹ ਆਣਨਾ ਪਿਆ ਐ | اوہ آݨدا پیا اے ਓਹ ਆਣਦਾ ਪਿਆ ਐ | اوہ اݨیدا پیا اے ਓਹ ਅਣੇਦਾ ਪਿਆ ਐ |
| We will also have to bring them back | اُنھاں نُوں واپس وی لیاوَݨا ہوسی ਉਨ੍ਹਾਂ ਨੂੰ ਵਾਪਿਸ ਵੀ ਲਿਆਵਣਾ ਹੋਸੀ | اُنھاں نُوں واپس وی آݨنا ہوسی ਉਨ੍ਹਾਂ ਨੂੰ ਵਾਪਿਸ ਵੀ ਆਣਨਾ ਹੋਸੀ | اُنھاں کی واپس وی آݨنا ہوسی ਉਨ੍ਹਾਂ ਕੀ ਵਾਪਿਸ ਵੀ ਆਣਨਾ ਹੋਸੀ | اُنھاں آں واپس وی آݨنا ہوسی ਉਨ੍ਹਾਂ ਆਂ ਵਾਪਿਸ ਵੀ ਆਣਨਾ ਹੋਸੀ | اُنھاں کُوں واپس وی آݨنا ہوسی ਉਨ੍ਹਾਂ ਕੂੰ ਵਾਪਿਸ ਵੀ ਆਣਨਾ ਹੋਸੀ |
| Eat it | کھا لَے ਖਾ ਲੈ | کھا گھِن ਖਾ ਘਿਨ | کھائی گھِن ਖਾਈ ਘਿਨ | کھا گھِن ਖਾ ਘਿਨ | کھا گھِن ਖਾ ਘਿਨ |
| Bring it Brought it | چا لیاؤ چا لیاندا ਚਾ ਲਿਆਓ ਚਾ ਲਿਆਂਦਾ | چا آݨو چا آندا ਚਾ ਆਣੋ ਚਾ ਆਂਦਾ | چائی آݨو چائی آندا ਚਾਈ ਆਣੋ ਚਾਈ ਆਂਦਾ | چا آݨو چا آندا ਚਾ ਆਣੋ ਚਾ ਆਂਦਾ | چا آݨو چا آندا ਚਾ ਆਣੋ ਚਾ ਆਂਦਾ |
| Take it Took it | چا لوو چا لیا ਚਾ ਲਵੋ ਚਾ ਲਿਆ | چا گھِنو چا گھِدا ਚਾ ਘਿਨੋ ਚਾ ਘਿਦਾ | چائی گھِنو چائی گھِدا ਚਾਈ ਘਿਨੋ ਚਾਈ ਘਿਦਾ | چا گھِنو چا گھِدا ਚਾ ਘਿਨੋ ਚਾ ਘਿਦਾ | چا گھِنو چا گھِدا ਚਾ ਘਿਨੋ ਚਾ ਘਿਦਾ |

=== Retention of the irrgeular past tense ===
In Jatki Punjabi, as well as in Saraiki, the irregular Punjabi past tense form of verbs is retained when used with the verb Karnā, a feature that is not present in Eastern dialects such as Majhi, or even in other Lahnda varieties such as Pothohari and Hindko.

The irregular past tense is generally the same throughout the Punjabi dialects (e.g. khādhā, peetā, nahātā, dhotā, moyā, latthā, khalotā, ḍaṭṭhā, suttā, keetā, dittā, ghidā, seetā, baddhā).

Jatki does seem to have some additional ones as well, such as runnā for royā (cried) ḍiṭṭhā for vekhya (seen), and syātā for syāneā (recognized).

Examples:

| English | Jatki | Majhi | Pothohari |
|---|---|---|---|
| Eat less rotis | روٹِیاں گھٹّ کھادھِیاں کرو ਰੋਟੀਆਂ ਘੱਟ ਖਾਧੀਆਂ ਕਰੋ | روٹِیاں گھٹّ کھایا کرو ਰੋਟੀਆਂ ਘੱਟ ਖਾਇਆ ਕਰੋ | روٹِیاں گھٹّ کھایا کرو ਰੋਟੀਆਂ ਘੱਟ ਖਾਇਆ ਕਰੋ |
| I will also be taking tea with you from tomorrow onwards | کلّ توں میں وی تُہاڈے نال چاء پِیتی کرساں ਕੱਲ੍ਹ ਤੋਂ ਮੈਂ ਵੀ ਤੁਹਾਡੇ ਨਾਲ ਚਾਹ ਪੀਤੀ ਕਰਸਾਂ | کلّ توں میں وی تُہاڈے نال چاء پیا کرانْگا ਕੱਲ੍ਹ ਤੋਂ ਮੈਂ ਵੀ ਤੁਹਾਡੇ ਨਾਲ ਚਾਹ ਪੀਆ ਕਰਾਂਗਾ | کلّ توں میں وی تُساں نال چاء پیا کرساں ਕੱਲ੍ਹ ਤੋਂ ਮੈਂ ਵੀ ਤੁਸਾਂ ਨਾਲ ਚਾਹ ਪੀਆ ਕਰਸਾਂ |
| You should also do it as such | تُسِیں وی اِنج/ایویں کِیتا کرو ਤੁਸੀਂ ਵੀ ਇੰਜ/ਐਵੇਂ ਕੀਤਾ ਕਰੋ | تُسِیں وی اِنج/ایویں کریا کرو ਤੁਸੀਂ ਵੀ ਇੰਜ/ਐਵੇਂ ਕਰਿਆ ਕਰੋ | تُساں وی اِسراں کریا کرو ਤੁਸਾਂ ਵੀ ਇਸਰਾਂ ਕਰਿਆ ਕਰੋ |
| Don't be giving me such tasks. | مینُوں اِنج دے/ایجہے کمّ نہ دِتّے کرو ਮੈਨੂੰ ਇੰਜ ਦੇ/ਅਜਿਹੇ ਕੱਮ ਨਾ ਦਿੱਤੇ ਕਰੋ | مینُوں اِنج دے/ایجِہے کمّ نہ دیا کرو ਮੈਨੂੰ ਇੰਜ ਦੇ/ਅਜਿਹੇ ਕੱਮ ਨਾ ਦਿਆ ਕਰੋ | میکی ایہے جِہے کمّ نہ دیا کرو ਮਿਕੀ ਇਹੇ ਜਿਹੇ ਕੱਮ ਨਾ ਦਿਆ ਕਰੋ |
| Tell him that he needs to eat and drink well. | اوہنُوں آکھو بہ اوہ کُجھ کھادھا پِیتا کرے ਓਹਨੂੰ ਆਖੋ ਬਾ ਓਹ ਕੁਝ ਖਾਧਾ ਪੀਤਾ ਕਰੇ | اوہنُوں آکھو کہ اوہ کُجھ کھایا پیا کرے ਓਹਨੂੰ ਆਖੋ ਕਿ ਓਹ ਕੁਝ ਖਾਇਆ ਪੀਆ ਕਰੇ | اُسکی آکھو کہ اوہ کُجھ کھایا پیا کرے ਉਸਕੀ ਆਖੋ ਕਿ ਓਹ ਕੁਝ ਖਾਇਆ ਪੀਆ ਕਰੇ |
| He wants that I should sleep on time | اوہ چاہندا اے میں ویلے نال سُتّا کراں ਉਹ ਚਾਹੰਦਾ ਐ ਮੈਂ ਵੇਲੇ ਨਾਲ ਸੁੱਤਾ ਕਰਾਂ | اوہ چاہندا اے میں ویلے نال سَونْیا کراں ਉਹ ਚਾਹੰਦਾ ਐ ਮੈਂ ਵੇਲੇ ਨਾਲ ਸੌਂਇਆ ਕਰਾਂ | اوہ چاہنا اے میں ویلے نال سیا کراں ਉਹ ਚਾਹਣਾ ਐ ਮੈਂ ਵੇਲੇ ਨਾਲ ਸਿਆ ਕਰਾਂ |
| Do talks of truth | گلّاں سچّیاں کیتِیاں کرو ਗੱਲਾਂ ਸੱਚੀਆਂ ਕੀਤੀਆਂ ਕਰੋ | گلّاں سچّیاں کریا کرو ਗੱਲਾਂ ਸੱਚੀਆਂ ਕਰਿਆ ਕਰੋ | گلّاں سچّیاں کریا کرو ਗੱਲਾਂ ਸੱਚੀਆਂ ਕਰਿਆ ਕਰੋ |
| You should listen to what I have to say | کدے میری گلّ وی سُن لئی کر کدے مینڈی گلّ وی سُن گھِدی کر ਕਦੇ ਮੇਰੀ ਗੱਲ ਵੀ ਸੁਣ ਲਈ ਕਰ ਕਦੇ ਮੈਂਡੀ ਗੱਲ ਵੀ ਸੁਣ ਘਿਦੀ ਕਰ | کدے میری گلّ وی سُن لیا کر ਕਦੇ ਮੇਰੀ ਗੱਲ ਵੀ ਸੁਣ ਲਿਆ ਕਰ | کدے مہاڑی گلّ وی سُنی گھِنیا کر ਕਦੇ ਮਹਾੜੀ ਗੱਲ ਵੀ ਸੁਣੀ ਘਿਨਿਆ ਕਰ |

==== This is also observed with the verbs "Rakkhnā" and "Jānā/Vanjnā". ====
Examples:

Asī̃ ohnū̃ ditti rakhie? (اسِیں اوہنُوں دِتّی رکھّیئے؟) instead of Asī̃ ohnū̃ dei rakhie? (اسِیں اوہنُوں دئی رکھّیئے؟)

(meaning, "Shall we keep on giving him?")

and

Oh keeti jāndā ae (اوہ کِیتی جاندا اے) instead of Oh kari jāndā ae (اوہ کری جاندا اے)

(meaning, "He keeps on doing")

Kalla mai-aan kamm keeti jaavan? instead of Kalla maiiyon kamm kari jaavan?

(meaning, "I alone am to keep on doing?)

==== This can be further observed with the verbs Aanā (to come) and Jānā/Vanjnā (to go), when used in this manner. ====
Ohnu ohndey pesay taan ditti aa (اوہنُوں اوہندے پیسے تاں دِتّی آ), meaning "Give him his money and come back"

Pesay taan mere ditti vanj (پیسے تاں میرے دِتّی ونج), meaning "Give my money as you go"

Pesay taan ditti veynda/jaanda (پیسے تاں دِتّی ویندا/جانا), meaning "You could have at least given the money as you went"

Mein hikk kamm keeti aavaan (میں ہِکّ کمّ نہ کیتی آواں), meaning "I'll be back after one task"

Mein veyndean do trae moṭian moṭian gallaan bas keeti jaavan (میں ویندیاں دو ترۓ گلّاں بس کیتی جاواں), meaning "I'm just going to say a few things as I go"

Ajj kujh baahroon na khaadhi aaveeye? (اجّ کُجھ باہرُوں نہ کھادی آوِیئے؟), meaning "Shouldn't we eat something from outside today?"

Aseen gall kareynde haaen, pehlon booha taan band keeti aa (اسِیں گلّ کریندے ہائیں، پہلوں بُوہا تاں بند کیتی آ), meaning "We will talk, first go close the door"

Booha band keeti jaaveen (بُوہا بند کیتی جاوِیں), meaning "Close the door when you go"

Oh ditti aaya karay (اوہ دِتّی آیا کرے), meaning "He can give (and come back)"

Oh ditti jaaya karay (اوہ دِتّی کرے), meaning "He can give give (while he is passing/leaving)"

Mein ḍiṭṭhi aavaan (میں ڈِتھّی آواں), meaning "I'll be back after a look"

Jaa nahaati aa (جا نہاتی آ), meaning "Go take a bath"

The words in bold would be "de", "kar", "khaa", "dekhya", and "nahaaya" in Standard Punjabi as well as in Urdu-Hindi translation.

==== With the verb Baiṭhnā ====
"Hun taan mein keeti baitha aan" instead of "Hun taan mein karii baitha aan".

(meaning, "Now I have done it" [So now what?])

"Peeti baitha ae" instead of "Pee baitha ae"

(meaning, "He has drunk")

== Bibliography ==
- Shackle, Christopher (1976). The Siraiki language of central Pakistan : a reference grammar. London: School of Oriental and African Studies.
- Shackle, Christopher (1979). "Problems of classification in Pakistan Panjab". Transactions of the Philological Society. 77 (1): 191–210. doi:10.1111/j.1467-968X.1979.tb00857.x. ISSN 0079-1636.
- Masica, Colin P. (1991). The Indo-Aryan languages. Cambridge language surveys. Cambridge University Press. ISBN 978-0-521-23420-7.
- Wagha, Muhammad Ahsan (1997). The development of Siraiki language in Pakistan (Ph.D.). School of Oriental and African Studies. Archived from the original on 14 February 2017. (requires registration)
