= Jhangvi dialect =

Dialect of Punjabi

Jhangvi
- جھنگوی; رچناوی
- Native to: Pakistan
- Region: Bar region of Punjab
- Ethnicity: Punjabis
- Language family: Indo-European: Indo-Iranian; Indo-Aryan; Northwestern; Lahnda (Western Punjabi); Jhangvi

Language codes
- ISO 639-3: –
- Glottolog: jatk1238

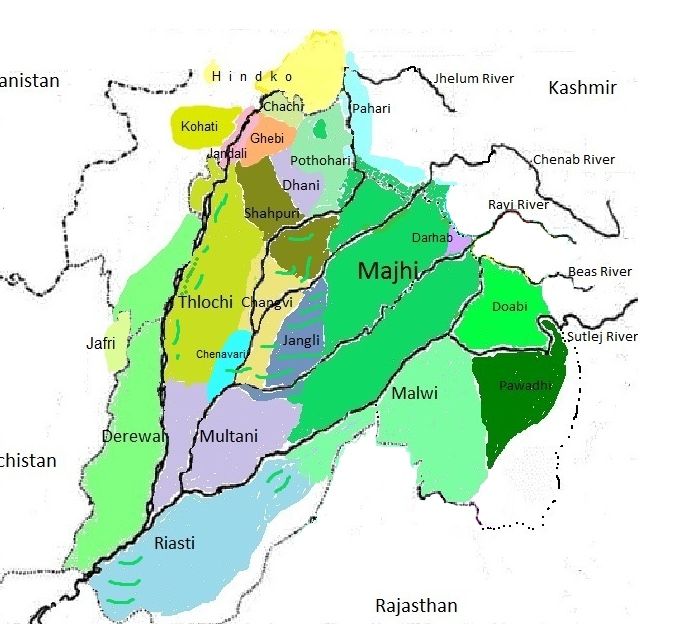
Map of dialects of Punjabi.

Jhangvi (/ˈdʒæŋvi/; جھنگوی; Punjabi pronunciation: [ˈd͡ʒàŋ.gᵊ.ʋi]), also known as Jhangochi (جھنگوچی), is a western dialect of Punjabi, predominantly spoken in central Punjab, Pakistan. Its name is derived from Jhang, its main city. It is spoken throughout a widespread area, starting from Khanewal to Jhang District at either end of Ravi and Chenab. It is also spoken in Chinot, Okara, Sahiwal, Toba Tek Singh, Hafizabad, Mandi Bahauddin, Pakpattan, Bahawalnagar and Faisalabad.

It is intermediate between Majhi and Multani. The similar Shahpuri dialect is spoken in Sargodha and Mandi Bahauddin, while Dhanni is spoken in Chakwal, Talagang and Khushab.

== Phonology ==
Jangli's sound inventory includes implosive consonants, but unlike in Saraiki these do not have phonemic status, as they do not contrast with plain voiced consonants. The implosives are more common than in Saraiki, and their set contains an unusual and highly rare consonant, a dental implosive /ɗ̪/, which contrasts with the regular retroflex implosive /ᶑ/.

== Similar dialects ==
Glottolog shows Jatki, Shahpuri and Dhanni as other dialects of Lahnda (Western Punjabi).

== Grammar ==
=== Continuous tense ===
Similar to Pothohari, Hindko, and other Western Punjabi dialects, Jhangochi also uses pyā to signify the continuous tense.

Many Majhi sub-dialects also utilize this tense.

English	Jatki		
English	Transliteration	Shahmukhi	Gurmukhi
I am doing	Mãi karda pya aan Mãi kareynda pya aan	میں کردا پیا آں میں کریندا پیا آں	ਮੈਂ ਕਰਦਾ ਪਿਆ ਆਂ ਮੈਂ ਕਰੇਂਦਾ ਪਿਆ ਆਂ
We are doing	Asī̃ karday paye haen Asī̃ kareynday paye haen ("aan" may also be used)	اسِیں کردے پئے ہائیں اسِیں کریندے پئے ہائیں	ਅਸੀਂ ਕਰਦੇ ਪਏ ਹਾਏਂ ਅਸੀਂ ਕਰੇਂਦੇ ਪਏ ਹਾਏਂ
You are doing (sing, m.)	Tū̃ karda pya ain Tū̃ kareynda pya ain	تُوں کردا پیا ایں تُوں کریندا پیا ایں	ਤੂੰ ਕਰਦਾ ਪਿਆ ਐਂ ਤੂੰ ਕਰੇਂਦਾ ਪਿਆ ਐਂ
You are doing (sing, f.)	Tū̃ kardi pyi ain Tū̃ kareyndi pyi ain	تُوں کردی پئی ایں تُوں کریندی پئی ایں	ਤੂੰ ਕਰਦੀ ਪਈ ਐਂ ਤੂੰ ਕਰੇਂਦੀ ਪਈ ਐਂ
You are doing (plural)	Tusī̃ karday paye o Tusī̃ kareynday paye o	تُسِیں کردے پئے او تُسِیں کردے پئے او	ਤੁਸੀਂ ਕਰਦੇ ਪਏ ਓ ਤੁਸੀਂ ਕਰੇਂਦੇ ਪਏ ਓ
He is doing	Ó karda pya ae Ó kareynda pya ae	اوہ کردا پیا اے اوہ کریندا پیا اے	ਉਹ ਕਰਦਾ ਪਿਆ ਐ ਉਹ ਕਰੇਂਦਾ ਪਿਆ ਐ
She is doing	Ó kardi pyi ae Ó kareyndi pyi ae	اوہ کردی پِئی اے اوہ کریندی پِئی اے	ਉਹ ਕਰਦੀ ਪਈ ਐ ਉਹ ਕਰੇਂਦੀ ਪਈ ਐ
They are doing (m.)	Ó karday paye no Ó kareynday paye hin	اوہ کردے پئے نوں اوہ کریندے پئے ہِن	ਉਹ ਕਰਦੇ ਪਏ ਉਹ ਕਰੇਂਦੇ ਪਏ
They are doing (f.)	Ó kardiyan pyian no Ó kareyndiyan pyian hin	اوہ کردِیاں پئِیاں نوں اوہ کردِیاں پئِیاں ہِن	ਉਹ ਕਰਦੀਆਂ ਪਈਆਂ ਨੋਂ ਉਹ ਕਰੇਂਦੀਆਂ ਪਈਆਂ ਹਿਨ

The place of "pyā" may sometimes be switched with respect to the verb.

"Tusī̃ bahoon changā kamm paye karenday o", meaning "You (plural) are doing a very good thing"

"Tū̃ bahoon changā kamm krendā ain pyā", meaning "You (sing, m) are doing a very good thing"

"Sāḍā hāl kehṛā puchhdā ãi, mar mar ke paye aan jeenday, meaning "What do you ask about us? We are living in great distress" (a song by Mansoor Malangi)

"Paye aapna vanjeynday visaah o", meaning "You are wasting the trust people have in you" (from "Tusi changean naseeban de shah")

"Eh dohven aape vich larde hin paye". meaning "These two are fighting amongst themselves"

"Ethay seklaan pyiaan vikkdiyaan hin" or "Ethay seklaan vikkdiyaan ne pyiaan", meaning "Bicycles are being sold here"

=== Future tense ===
The future tense in Jatki Punjabi is formed by adding -s as opposed to the Eastern Punjabi gā.

This tense is also utilized in Pothwari, Hindko, Saraiki and other Western Punjabi dialects.

English	Jatki		
English	Transliteration	Shahmukhi	Gurmukhi
I will do	Mãi karsā̃ Mãi kareysā̃	میں کرساں میں کریساں	ਮੈਂ ਕਰਸਾਂ ਮੈਂ ਕਰੇਸਾਂ
We will do	Asī̃ karsā̃ / Asī̃ karsā̃e Asī̃ kareysā̃ / Asī̃ kareysā̃e	اسِیں کرساں / اسِیں کرسائیں اسِیں کریساں / اسِیں کریسائیں	ਅਸੀਂ ਕਰਸਾਂ / ਅਸੀਂ ਕਰਸਾਏਂ ਅਸੀਂ ਕਰੇਸਾਂ / ਅਸੀਂ ਕਰੇਸਾਏਂ
You will do (singular)	Tū̃ karsãi Tū̃ kareysãi	تُوں کرسیں تُوں کریسیں	ਤੂੰ ਕਰਸੈਂ ਤੂੰ ਕਰੇਸੈਂ
You will do (plural)	Tusī̃ karso Tusī̃ kareyso	تُسِیں کرسو تُسِیں کریسو	ਤੁਸੀਂ ਕਰਸੋ ਤੁਸੀਂ ਕਰੇਸੋ
He/She will do	Ó karsi Ó kaeyrsi	اوہ کرسی اوہ کریسی	ਓਹ ਕਰਸੀ ਓਹ ਕਰੇਸੀ
They will do	Ó karsan Ó kareysan	اوہ کرسن اوہ کریسن	ਓਹ ਕਰਸਨ ਓਹ ਕਰੇਸਨ

=== Past Tense ===
The past tense in the Jatki dialects differs from that of Eastern Punjabi.

English	Jatki		Pothohari	Majhi
English	Shahpuri/Jhangochi	Dhanni	Pothohari	Majhi
I was doing	میں کریندا پیا ہمُوں (جھنگوچی) میں کردا پیا ہاسُو (شاہپُوری) ਮੈਂ ਕਰੇਂਦਾ ਪਿਆ ਹਮੂੰ (ਝੰਗਵੀ) ਮੈਂ ਕਰਦਾ ਪਿਆ ਹਾਸੂ (ਸ਼ਾਹਪੂਰੀ)	میں کریندا پیا اوس ਮੈਂ ਕਰੇਂਦਾ ਪਿਆ ਓਸ	میں کرنا پیا ساں ਮੈਂ ਕਰਨਾ ਪਿਆ ਸਾਂ	میں کردا پیا ساں ਮੈਂ ਕਰਦਾ ਪਿਆ ਸਾਂ
We were doing	اسِیں کریندے/کردے پئے ہاسے ਅਸੀਂ ਕਰਦੇ/ਕਰੇਂਦੇ ਪਏ ਹਾਸੇ	اسِیں کریندے پئے اوس ਅਸੀਂ ਕਰੇਂਦੇ ਪਏ ਓਸ	اساں کرنے پئے سیاں اساں کرنے پئے ساں ਅਸਾਂ ਕਰਨੇ ਪਏ ਸਿਆਂ/ਸਾਂ	اسِیں کردے پئے ساں ਅਸੀਂ ਕਰਦੇ ਪਏ ਸਾਂ
You were doing (sing.)	تُوں کردا/کردیندا پیا ہائیں ਤੂੰ ਕਰਦਾ/ਕਰੇਂਦਾ ਪਿਆ ਹਾਏਂ	تُوں کریندا پیا ایاں ਤੂੰ ਕਰੇਂਦਾ ਪਿਆ ਅਇਆਂ	تُوں کرنا پیا سَیں ਤੂੰ ਕਰਨਾ ਪਿਆ ਸੈਂ	تُوں کردا پیا سیں ਤੂੰ ਕਰਦਾ ਪਿਆ ਸੈਂ
You were doing (pl.)	تُسِیں کردے/کریندے پئے ہائے (جھنگوچی) تُسِیں کردے/کریندے پئے ہاؤ (شاہپُوری) ਤੁਸੀਂ ਕਰਦੇ/ਕਰੇਂਦੇ ਪਏ ਹਾਏ (ਝੰਗਵੀ) ਤੁਸੀਂ ਕਰਦੇ/ਕਰੇਂਦੇ ਪਏ ਹਾਓ (ਸ਼ਾਹਪੂਰੀ)	تُسِیں کریندے پئے اَو ਤੁਸੀਂ ਕਰੇਂਦੇ ਪਏ ਆਓ	تُساں کرنے پئے سیو تُساں کرنے پِئے سو ਤੁਸਾਂ ਕਰਨੇ ਪਏ ਸਿਓ/ਸੋ	تُسِیں کردے پئے سو ਤੁਸੀਂ ਕਰਦੇ ਪਏ ਸੋ
He was doing	اوہ کردا/کریندا پیا ہا ਉਹ ਕਰਦਾ/ਕਰੇਂਦਾ ਪਿਆ ਹਾ	اوہ کریندا پیا آیا ਉਹ ਕਰੇਂਦਾ ਪਿਆ ਆਇਆ	اوہ کرنا پیا سا اوہ کرنا پیا سی ਉਹ ਕਰਨਾ ਪਿਆ ਸਾ/ਸੀ	اوہ کردا پیا سی ਉਹ ਕਰਦਾ ਪਿਆ ਸੀ
She was doing	اوہ کردی/کریندی پئی ہائی ਉਹ ਕਰਦੀ/ਕਰੇਂਦੀ ਪਈ ਹਾਈ	اوہ کریندی پئی آئی ਉਹ ਕਰੇਂਦੀ ਪਈ ਆਈ	اوہ کرنی پئی سی ਉਹ ਕਰਨੀ ਪਈ ਸੀ	اوہ کردی پئی سی ਉਹ ਕਰਦੀ ਪਈ ਸੀ
They were doing (m.)	اوہ کردے/کریندے پئے ہان ਉਹ ਕਰਦੇ/ਕਰੇਂਦੇ ਪਏ ਹਾਨ	اوہ کریندے پئے آہے ਉਹ ਕਰਦੇ/ਕਰੇਂਦੇ ਪਏ ਆਏ	اوہ کرنے پئے سے اوہ کرنے پئے سن ਉਹ ਕਰਨੇ ਪਏ ਸੇ/ਸਨ	اوہ کردے پئے سن ਉਹ ਕਰਦੇ ਪਏ ਸਨ
They were doing (f.)	اوہ کردِیاں/کریندِیاں پئیاں ہان ਉਹ ਕਰਦੀਆਂ/ਕਰੇਂਦੀਆਂ ਪਈਆਂ ਹਾਨ	اوہ کریندِیاں پئیاں آئیاں ਉਹ ਕਰੇਂਦੀਆਂ ਪਈਆਂ ਆਈਆਂ	اوہ کرنِیاں پئیاں سِیاں اوہ کرنِیاں پئیاں سن ਉਹ ਕਰਨੀਆਂ ਪਈਆਂ ਸੀਆਂ/ਸਨ	اوہ کردِیاں پئیاں سن ਉਹ ਕਰਦੀਆਂ ਪਈਆਂ ਸਨ

=== Present tense ===
The present tense of non-causative verbs in Jatki may involve the addition of -eyndā, while causative verbs may attain either -eyndā or -āandā. The future tense changes accordingly.

Verbs that have a causative form, rarely acquire -eyndā, for example, Mardā (dies) cannot become Mareyndā (kills/hits) as that is the present form of Maarnā (killing/hitting).

However, Mannnā (to be convinced) and Mannāvnā (to convince) both can be said as Maneyndā in the present form.

Verbs like āvan (to come) and lyāvan (to bring) will not take -eyndā, as they lack a passive form, so they are either said as -āndā or -aundā

English	Jatki Punjabi		
English	Present	Future	Present Passive
Dividing	Vanḍeyndā / Vanḍdā	Vanḍeysi / Vanḍdsi	Vanḍeendā
Doing	Kareyndā / Kardā	Kareysi / Karsi	Kareendā
Throwing	Saṭṭeyndā / Saṭṭdā	Saṭṭeysi / Saṭṭsi	Saṭṭeendā
Removing	Kaḍḍheyndā / Kaḍḍhdā	Kaḍḍheysi / Kaḍḍhsi	Kaḍḍheendā
Scattering	Ruleyndā / Roldā	Ruleysi / Rolsi	Roleendā
To be making one cry	Ruveyndā / Ruvaandā	Ruveysi / Ruvaasi	Ruvāveedā
To feed	Khaveyndā / Khavaandā	Khaveysi / Khavaasi	Khāaveedā
Beating	Mareyndā / Maardā	Mareysi / Maarsi	Mareendā/Māreendā
Moving	Ṭureyndā / Ṭordā	Ṭureysi / Ṭorsi	Ṭureendā
Using	Varteyndā / Vartdā	Varteysi / Vartsi	Varteendā
Cutting	Kapeyndā / Kappdā	Kapeysi / Kappsi	Kapeendā
Chopping	Vaḍḍheyndā / Vaḍḍhdā	Vaḍḍheysi/ Vaḍḍhsi	Vaḍḍheendā
To be making one understand	Samjheyndā / Samjhaandā	Samjheysi / Samjhaasi	Samjhaaveedā
Raising/Lifting	Cheyndā / Chaandā	Cheysi / Chaasi	Chaveendā
Putting/Pouring/Adding	Peyndā / Paandā	Peysi / Paasi	Paveendā/Pāveedā
Bringing	Aaṅdā / Aṅeydā	Aaṅsi / Aṅeysi	Aaṅeā veyndā
Being	Hondā	Hosi	Hoveendā
Giving	Deyndā	Deysi	Deyveendā (is given) Ḍheendā (is obtained)
Calls	Sadd'da / Sadeynda	Sadeysi	Sadeenda

The progressive tense is built upon the present tense, and is used in all Punjabi dialects. It is made by ending the verb with -eān in the present form.

For example, "to be doing" or "while doing", can be either kardeān or kareyndeān.

=== Passive tense ===
The Jatki dialects have a special passive tense for most verbs.

The present passive is made by adding -eendā, past passive by adding -eejā/eeyā, subjunctive by adding -eevay (s.) and -eevan (pl), progressive by adding -eendeān, gerundive passive by adding -eevna/eejna and future passive by adding -eesi. The continuous passive is built upon the present passive by adding pyā, while perfect passive is built by adding gyā to the past passive.

Varteendā (is used), Varteenday (are used), Varteevay/Varteejay (to be used, sing), Varteevan/Varteejan (to be used, pl), Varteejā/Varteeyā (was used), Vartee-gyā (has been used), Varteenda-pyā (is being used), Varteendeān (while being used), Varteevna/Varteejna (its "being used"), Varteesi (will be used), Vartee-veysi or Vartee-jaasi (will have been used/will end up being used), Vartee-veynda or Vartee-jaanda (gets used).

Note: The past passive in Shahpuri is made by adding -eevyā, in Jhangochi by adding -eeyaā, Dhani is made by adding -eetā, and in Thalochi and it is made by adding -eechā. In Saraiki it is also added with -eechā/-eejā.

Active		Passive	
English	Jatki Punjabi	English	Jatki Punjabi
Is cutting	کٹّدا پیا اے / کٹیندا پیا اے ਕੱਟਦਾ ਪਿਆ ਐ / ਕਟੇੰਦਾ ਪਿਆ ਐ	Is being cut	کٹِیندا پیا اے ਕਟੀਂਦਾ ਪਿਆ ਐ
To cut	کٹّنا ਕੱਟਣਾ	To be cut	کٹِیوَنا / کٹِیجنا ਕਟੀਵਣਾ / ਕਟੀਜਣਾ
If he cuts	جے اوہ کٹّے ਜੇ ਉਹ ਕੱਟੇ	If it is cut	جے اوہ کٹِیوے/کٹِیجے ਜੇ ਉਹ ਕਟੀਵੇ/ਕਟੀਜੇ
Shall I cut?	میں کٹّاں؟ ਮੈਂ ਕੱਟਾਂ?	Shall I be cut?	میں کٹِیواں/کٹِیجاں؟ ਮੈਂ ਕਟੀਵਾਂ?
Will cut (sing.)	کٹّسی / کٹیسی ਕੱਟਸੀ / ਕਟੇਸੀ	Will be cut (sing.)	کٹِیسی ਕੱਟੀਸੀ
He cut it	اُس کٹیا ਉਸ ਕੱਟਿਆ	Was cut by him	اوہندے کولُوں کٹِیا (کٹی آ) / کٹِیجا ਓਂਹਦੇ ਕੋਲੂੰ ਕਟੀਆ/ਕਟੀਜਾ
I will beat	میں مارساں / میں مریساں ਮੈਂ ਮਾਰਸਾਂ / ਮੈਂ ਮਰੇਸਾਂ	I will be beaten	میں مرِیساں ਮੈਂ ਮਰੀਸਾਂ
I did not hear	میں سُنیا نہیں ਮੈਂ ਸੁਣਿਆ ਨਹੀਂ	Was not heard by me	مینُوں سُنِیجا نہیں ਮੈਨੂੰ ਸੁਣੀਜਾ ਨਹੀਂ
Let him use first	اوہ پہلوں ورتے تاں سہی ਉਹ ਪਹਿਲੋਂ ਵਰਤੇ ਤਾਂ ਸਹੀ	Let it be used first	اوہ پہلوں ورتِیوے تاں سہی ਉਹ ਪਹਿਲੋਂ ਵਰਤੀਵੇ ਤਾਂ ਸਹੀ
Uses	ورتدا / ورتیندا ਵਰਤਦਾ/ਵਰਤੇਂਦ	Under use	ورتِیندا ਵਰਤੀਂਦਾ
Does not give	نہیں دیندا ਨਹੀਂ ਦੇਂਦਾ	Is not to be given	نہیں دیوِیندا / نہیں دیوی دا ਨਹੀਂ ਦੇਵੀਂਦਾ/ਨਹੀਂ ਦੇਵੀਦਾ
Does not give	نہیں دیندا ਨਹੀਂ ਦੇਂਦਾ	Is not obtained	نہیں ڈھِیندا ਨਹੀਂ ਢੀਂਦਾ
They (f.) uproot it	اوہ پٹّدِیاں نو / اوہ پٹیندِیاں ہِن ਉਹ ਪੱਟਦੀਆਂ ਨੋਂ ਉਹ ਪਟੇਂਦੀਆਂ ਹਿਨ	They (f.) are to be uprooted	او اجے پٹِیونِیاں ہِن ਉਹ ਅਜੇ ਪਟੀਵਣੀਆਂ ਹਿਨ
Friends do not agree	سنگّی نہیں منّدے/منیندے ਸੰਗੀ ਨਹੀਂ ਮੰਨਦੇ/ਮਨੇਂਦੇ	Friends cannot be convinced	سنگّی نہیں منِیندے ਸੰਗੀ ਨਹੀਂ ਮੰਨੀਂਦੇ
He came and chopped it	اوہ وڈھّ گیا ਉਹ ਵੱਢ ਗਿਆ	It was chopped	اوہ وڈھی گیا / وڈھِیج گیا ਉਹ ਵੱਢੀ/ਵੱਢੀਜ ਗਿਆ
He catches	اوہ پھڑدا اے ਉਹ ਫੜਦਾ ਐ	They were caught	اوہ پھڑی/پھڑِیج گئے ਉਹ ਫੜੀ/ਫੜੀਜ ਗਏ
I am not reading	میں پڑھدا نہیں پیا ਮੈਂ ਪੜ੍ਹਦਾ ਨਹੀਂ ਪਿਆ	It is not being read by me (I cannot understand it)	میتھُوں پڑھِیندا نہیں پیا ਮੈਥੂੰ ਪੜ੍ਹੀਂਦਾ ਨਹੀਂ ਪਿਆ
When will he use?	کدوں ورتسی/ورتیسی؟ ਕਦੋਂ ਵਰਤਸੀ/ਵਰਤੇਸੀ?	When will it be used?	کدوں ورتِیسی؟ ਕਦੋਂ ਵਰਤੀਸੀ?
He wil come and use it tomorrow	کلّ ورت ویسی ਕੱਲ੍ਹ ਵਰਤ ਵੇਸੀ	It will end up being used tomorrow	کلّ ورتی ویسی ਕੱਲ੍ਹ ਵਰਤੀ ਵੇਸੀ
He is not eating or driking	اوہ کُجھ کھاندا پِیندا نہیں پیا ਓਹ ਕੁਝ ਖਾਂਦਾ ਪੀਂਦਾ ਨਹੀਂ ਪਿਆ	Nothing is being eaten or drunk by him	اوہندے کولُوں کُجھ وی کھوِیندا پِوِیندا نہیں پیا ਓਂਹਦੇ ਕੋਲੂੰ ਕੁਝ ਵੀ ਖਵੀਂਦਾ ਪਵੀਂਦਾ ਨਹੀਂ ਪਿਆ
To forgive	بخشنا ਬਸ਼ਣਾ	To be forgiven	بخشِیوݨا ਬਖ਼ਸ਼ੀਵਣਾ

Some verbs may attain this form without any change in usage or meaning, such as:

ਬਵ੍ਹਣਾ ਉਠੀਵਣਾ / بہوَنا اُٹھِیونا, being the same as ਉੱਠਣਾ / اُٹھّنا

ਦਿਸੀਂਦਾ / دِسِیندا, being the same as ਦਿੱਸਦਾ / دِسّدا

Proverb example: Heṭṭhon utton vaḍḍheeveeye taan ḍakk sadeeenda (ہیٹھوں اُتّوں وڈھِیوِیئے تاں ڈکّ سدِیندا)

(If we are cut from top to bottom, only then may we be called as a cane)

Note: The past tense of Marnā is Moyā (dead) and the past passive tense is Mareejā (killed)

=== Agentive Tense ===
The agentive tense of verb in Punjabi is either shown in the standard manner by adding the words "āalā" or "laggeā".

For example, "He is to come" or "He is about to come" is spoken as Oh aavan aalā/laggeā ae.

In Jatki, another manner exists where the root verb is suffixated by adding -oo

Examples:

Tun kitthay jaaoo/vanjoo ain? (Where are you to go?)

Oh kay karoo ae? (What is he up to)

Ajj mein tuhānu hik ehjihi gall sunāoo aan (Today I am about to tell you such a thing...)

Tuseen ohnu deoo o ke menu deoo o? (You are to give him or me?)

Ghaabarda kyon pya ain? Saanu vi miloo ae (Why are you worried? We too are to get it)

== Vocabulary ==
=== Present plural marker ===
The dialects of Jatki Punjabi use Hin (ہِن) or No (نو) to signify the present plural tense. These are dialectal forms of "Han" (ہَن) and "Ne" (نے) respectively.

"Do janay hin/no" (دو جنے ہِن/نو), meaning "There are two people".

The word "hin" may be attached with the verb colloquially.

"Oh menu dassdin" (اوہ مینُوں دسّدِن), meaning "They tell me".

"Bahoon vāday keetin" (بہُوں وعدے کِیتِن)، meaning "Made many promises"

The word Hen (ہَینڑ) may also be used.

=== Words for "then/again" ===
Words like Vall, Valla, Vatt (وتّ) or Muṛ (مُڑ) and its variant pronunciation Munṛ (مُنڑ) are used instead of the Standard Punjabi Phir (پھیر).

"Halā vatt ke/kya hoya/thiya?" (ہلا وتّ کے ہویا؟), meaning "Alright, what happened then?".

"Tenu vatt vii aas praai rahi" (تَینُوں وتّ وی آس پرائی رہی), meaning "Even then, you had hopes for some other", a lyric from "Changean Naseeban de Shah", by Talib Hussain Dard

=== Words for "Going" ===
Words like Vaj̈an (ونجن), Jāwaṇ and Vehna (جاوَن) are both used.

"Kiddey vendā/jāndā pyā ain?" (کِتھّے ویندا/جاندا پیا ایں؟), meaning "Where are you going?"

=== Words for "Someone" and "What" ===
For "what", Jatki either uses the common word Kii (کی) or the Western word Ke (کے) or Kya.

For "someone", Jatki may use either the standard Kisay (کِسے) or another word that is Kahee'ṇ (کہِیں)

=== Words for "That" ===
Ba, Bai or Jo are used, as opposed to ke in Standard Punjabi. (بہ، بئی، جو)

Mein tuhaanu dassaan bai (ke) aes ton changga mein pehla KaDDe nhi dditha

(Let me tell you that I have never seen one better than this)

KaDDe vi mein nahi aakhya jo (ke) tun menu kujh desein taahin mein tenu kujh desaan

(Never did I say that you must first give only then to receive from me)

Tusi'n inj keeta karo ba (ke) menu dass ditta karo

(You should do it as such that you should inform me)

Menu pata ae ba (ke) khoon rattaa ae, tey hetna rattaa ae jo (ke) teray hatthaan tey mehndi lagsi

(I know that blood is red, and it is so much that it will look like henna on your hands)

Similarly, Kyunjo (or Kyunjay) is used for Kyunke, and Taanjo (or Taanjay) is used for Taake.

=== Supporting verbs ===
In Jatki, many verbs exist to support the adjoining verb, giving the same meaning as de/dittaa/devay/devaan/denda/desi.

De chaa (دے چا), is the same as De de (دے دے), meaning "Give it"

Rakkh chhaḍḍ (رکھّ چھڈّ), is the same as Rakkh de (رکھّ دے), meaning "Place it"

Chaa karay (چا کرے), is the same as Kar devay (کر دیوے), meaning "Someone do it"

Other examples:

Chaa keetaa (چا کیتا), meaning "Done it"

Mukaa chhoryaa (مُکا چھوڑیا), meaning "Finished it"

Pivaa chaa (پِوا چا), meaning "Get me (something) to drink"

Laah satto (لاہ سٹّو), meaning "Remove it"

Bhann sattyaa (بھنّ سٹّیا), meaning "Broke it"

Hun dass vi chhaḍḍo (ہُن دسّ وی چھڈّو), meaning "Now tell already"

Koi ghatt chhaḍḍay (کوئی گھتّ چھڈّے), meaning "Someone come and pour it"

Mein ohnu de chhaḍḍsaan (میں اوہنُوں دے چھڈّساں), meaning "I will give him"

Maar ghattsan (مار گھتّسن), meaning "Will come and beat"

=== The verb "Vattnā" ===
In its past form Vadā, it can either show continuous action (like pyā) or a state of being (like hoyā/thiya), depending on the main verb's form.

In the latter case, Khalā and Khlotā (both meaning "standing") may also be used.

Menu bhukkh laggi vadi/khali/pyi ae (I have hunger)

Menu bhukkh laggdi vadi/pyi ae (I am getting hungry)

Oh chendā vadā/pyā ae (He is picking it up)

Oh chaai vadā/khalā ae (He has it picked up)

Ukkā moye vaday āen (We are completely dead)

Oh khādhi khalā hosi (He must have eaten)

Ohnu treh laggi vadi/khloti ae (He has thirst)

Mein kamm mukaai vadā/khalā/khlotā aa'n (I have finished the work)

Mein dhammi da progam keeti khalā/vadā/khlotā/pyā aa'n (I have decided it for morning)

Rujjhay vade o, naveān saangeān vich (You are busy in your new attachments, a lyric from "Tusi Changean Naseeban de Shah", a song by Talib Hussain Dard)

In other forms, the verb Vattnā, (literally meaning "to wander") depicts a continuity in an action, and is synonymous with the word Phirnā.

Hyaati saari nassdyān vattnā/phirnā (Running for all life)

Oh tenu kay kujh ghalldā vattdā/phirdā ee? (What does he keep on sending you?)

Beyli ruṭṭhā vadā hove tey aseen jeende vateeye/phireeye? (The friend is unhappy and we are to keep on living?)

Mein injay tue'n magar laggya vattaa'n/phiraa'n? (I should stay after you for no reason?)

=== Personal pronouns ===
Jatki uses special personal pronouns such as Kãi'n (Kihne/Kis), and Jãi'n (Jihne/Jis).

Kãi aakhya? کَیں آکھیا؟, meaning "Says who?"

Jãi vii aakhya hove/thive جَیں وی آکھیا ہووے, meaning "Whomsoever might have said it"

Eh kãi'nda ghar ae? ایہہ کَیندا گھر اے؟, meaning "Whose house is this?"

Kãi kãi janay eh aali kheyḍ kheyḍi ee?, کیں کیں جنڑے ایہہ آلی کھیڈ کھیڈی ہئی؟ meaning "Who has played this game?"

Jãi kahe'n vii karna hove/thive جَیں کہیں وی کرنا ہووے or Jis kise vii karna hove/thive جِس کِسے وی کرنا ہووے, meaning "Whomsoever wants to do"

Jainda vii mann kareynda or Jai'n kahee'n da vii mann kareynda

=== Pronominal affixes ===
Eh kay keetum (What have I done?)

Eh kay keeto-ee (What have you done?)

Eh kay keeta-nhay (What have you done? plural/respect)

Eh kay keeta-nay (What have they done?)

Eh kay keeto-say (What have we done?)

Eh kay keetus (What has he done?)

Kii naa'n-us? (What is his name?)

Nisay keeta (We did not do)

Nimoo keeta (I did not do)

Tenu aakhyam (I have told you)

Bhiraa nisay? (Are we not brothers?)

Jehri naveen film kaddhi nay, ḍiṭṭhi hayi? (The new film they released, have you seen it?)

Punjabi aapni dhi nu sikhaai koi nhoo'n? (You did not teach your daughter Punjabi?)

Bhalla hone (respectfully, "Thank you")

Bhalla hovi (Thank you)

=== Counting ===
Counting is generally the same, but with some notable deviations being:

English		Jatki Punjabi		Standard Punjabi	
Numbers	Numerals	Transliteration	Shahmukhi	Transliteration	Shahmukhi
One	1	Hikk	ہِکّ	Ikk	اِکّ
Three	3	Trae	ترَے	Tinn	تِنّ
Ten	10	Dāh	داہ	Das	دس
Eleven	11	Yārā̃	یاراں	Gyārā̃	گیاراں
Twenty three	23	Trei / Trevi	ترئی / تریوی	Tei	تئی
Twenty four	24	Chavhi	چوّھی	Chauvi	چَووی
Twenty five	25	Panjhi / Panjhvi	پنجھی / پنجھوی	Panji	پچّی
Twenty six	26	Chhavvi	چھوی	Chhabbi	چھبّی
Thirty	30	Trih	ترِیہہ	Tih	تِیہہ

=== Addition of "v" in verb forms ===
The usage of the "v" sound in Jhangochi is far more present that other Punjabi dialects.

English	Jhangochi		Standard Punjabi	
English	Shahmukhi	Gurmukhi	Shahmukhi	Gurmukhi
Happening	ہووَنا	ਹੋਵਣਾ	ہونا	ਹੋਣਾ
Going	جاوَنا	ਜਾਵਣਾ	جانا	ਜਾਣਾ
Eating	کھاوَنا	ਖਾਵਣਾ	کھانا	ਖਾਣਾ
Drinking	پِیوَنا	ਪੀਵਣਾ	پِینا	ਪੀਣਾ
Giving	دیوَنا	ਦੇਵਣਾ	دینا	ਦੇਣਾ
Taking	لوَنا	ਲਵਣਾ	لَینا	ਲੈਣਾ
It is our job to give	ساڈا کمّ اے اسِیں دیوِیئے	ਸਾਡਾ ਕੰਮ ਐ ਅਸੀਂ ਦੇਵੀਏ	ساڈا کمّ اے اسِیں دیِئے	ਸਾਡਾ ਕੰਮ ਐ ਅਸੀਂ ਦੇਈਏ
Coming	آوَنا	ਆਵਣਾ	آؤنا	ਆਉਣਾ
Staying	رہوَنا	ਰਵ੍ਹਣਾ	رہنا	ਰਹਿਣਾ
They should allow some work	کوئی کمّ تاں ہوون دیون	ਕੋਈ ਕੰਮ ਤਾਂ ਹੋਵਣ ਦੇਵਣ	کوئی کمّ تاں ہون دین	ਕੋਈ ਕੰਮ ਤਾਂ ਹੋਣ ਦੇਣ
Shall we come?	اسِیں آوِیئے؟	ਅਸੀਂ ਆਵੀਏ?	اسِیں آیِئے؟	ਅਸੀਂ ਆਈਏ?
Bringing	لیاوَنا	ਲਿਆਵਣਾ	لیاؤنا	ਲਿਆਉਣਾ
Hold	پھڑاوِیں	ਫੜਾਵੀਂ	پھڑائیں	ਫੜਾਈਂ
Shall I let it happen?	میں ایہنُوں ہووَن دیواں؟	ਮੈਂ ਇਹਨੂੰ ਹੋਵਣ ਦੇਵਾਂ?	میں ایہنُوں ہون دیاں؟	ਮੈਂ ਇਹਨੂੰ ਹੋਣ ਦਿਆਂ?
May he live	جِیوندا رہوے	ਜਿੰਦਾ, ਰਵ੍ਹੇ	جِیوندا رہے	ਜਿਉਂਦਾ ਰਹੇ
Is not to be given	نہیں دیوِیندا	ਨਹੀਂ ਦੇਵੀਂਦਾ	نہیں دئی دا	ਨਹੀਂ ਦੇਈਦਾ

=== General vocabulary ===
Jatki dialects have several words that differ from Standard Punjabi.

English	Jatki		Standard Punjabi	
English	Shahmukhi	Gurmukhi	Shahmukhi	Gurmukhi
Many	بہُوں	ਬਹੂੰ	بہت	ਬਹੁਤ
Cried / To Cry	رُنّا، رووَنا	ਰੁੰਨਾ, ਰੋਵਣਾ	رویا، رونا	ਰੋਇਆ, ਰੋਣਾ
Happening	ہووَنا	ਹੋਵਣਾ/ਥੀਣਾ	ہونا	ਹੋਣਾ
Lifting	چاوَنا	ਚਾਵਣਾ/ਚਾਣਾ	چُکّنا	ਚੁੱਕਣਾ
Again/Then	وتّ / مُڑ	ਵੱਤ / ਮੁੜ / ਵੱਲ / ਵੱਲਾ	پھیر	ਫੇਰ
Wandering	وتّنا	ਵੱਤਣਾ	پھِرنا	ਫਿਰਨਾ
Day	دینْہہ	ਦੇਂਹ	دِن	ਦਿਨ
Quickly	ٹھَوہ / جھب	ਠਹੁ / ਝਬ	چھیتی	ਛੇਤੀ
More	چوکھا / گھنا	ਚੋਖਾ / ਘਣਾ	زیادہ	ਜ਼ਿਆਦਾ
To sleep	سَیں ونج	ਸੈਂ ਵੰਜ/ ਸਾਮ੍ਹ ਵੰਜ	سَوں جا	ਸੌਂ ਜਾ
Placing	پیا، پوَنا، پوندا، پوسی	ਪਿਆ, ਪਵਣਾ, ਪੋਂਦਾ, ਪੋਸੀ	پیا، پینا، پَیندا، پویگا	ਪਿਆ, ਪੈਣਾ, ਪੈਂਦਾ, ਪਵੇਗਾ
To lose	ونجاوَنا	ਵੰਞਾਵਣਾ	گواؤنا	ਗਵਾਉਣਾ
Going	ونج، ویندا، ویسی جا، جاندا، جاسی	ਵੰਜ, ਵੇਂਦਾ, ਵੇਸੀ ਜਾ, ਜਾਂਦਾ, ਜਾਸੀ	جا، جاندا، جاویگا	ਜਾ, ਜਾਂਦਾ, ਜਾਵੇਗਾ/ਜਾਊਗਾ ਵਗ, ਵਗਦਾ ਵਾਗੂਗਾ
Alright / Okay	ہلا	ਹਲਾ	اچھا	ਅੱਛਾ
Wife	سوانی، ٹبّری	ਸਵਾਣੀ, ਟੱਬਰੀ	زنانی	ਜ਼ਨਾਨੀ
Boy	چھوہَر / جاتک	ਛੋਹਰ / ਜਾਤਕ	مُنڈا	ਮੁੰਡਾ
Life	حیاتی	ਹਿਆਤੀ	زندگی	ਜ਼ਿੰਦਗੀ
To pull	چھِکّنا	ਛਿੱਕਣਾ	کھِچّنا	ਖਿੱਚਣਾ
To beat	ماردا / مریندا مارسی / مریسی	ਮਾਰਦਾ / ਮਰੇਂਦਾ ਮਾਰਸੀ / ਮਰੇਸੀ	ماردا، ماریگا	ਮਾਰਦਾ / ਮਾਰੂਗਾ
To cut	کپّنا / وڈھّنا	ਕੱਪਣਾ / ਵੱਢਣਾ	کٹّنا	ਕੱਟਣਾ
For	کاݨ / آسطے	ਕਾਣ / ਆਸਤੇ	لئی	ਲਈ / ਵਾਸਤੇ
Due to	پارُوں	ਪਾਰੂੰ	کرکے / کارن	ਕਰਕੇ / ਕਾਰਨ
May	شالا	ਸ਼ਾਲਾ	رب کرے	ਰੱਬ ਕਰੇ
Lest	متاں	ਮਤਾਂ	کِتّے ایہہ نہ ہووے	ਕਿੱਤੇ ਇਹ ਨਾ ਹੋਵੇ
Friendship	سن٘گت	ਸੰਗਤ	دوستی	ਦੋਸਤੀ

=== Words for "taking" and "bringing" ===
Commonly observed in the Lahnda dialects is the use of GhinNā (گھِننا) and AaṇNā (آننا) instead of the Eastern Punjabi words Laiṇā (لَینا) and Lyāṇā (لیانا).

Jhangochi and Shahpuri make use of the first set. The Dhani dialect however, seems to lean more towards the former.

English	Jatki		Pothohari	Hindko	Saraiki
English	Shahpuri/Jhangochi	Dhanni	Pothohari	Hindko	Saraiki
From tomorrow onwards, I'll also bring it for you, just cope for today.	کلّ توں میں تُہانُوں وی لیا دِتّا کرساں، اجّ گُزارہ کر لوو ਕੱਲ੍ਹ ਤੋਂ ਮੈਂ ਤੁਹਾਨੂੰ ਵੀ ਲਿਆ ਦਿੱਤਾ ਕਰਸਾਂ, ਅੱਜ ਗੁਜ਼ਾਰਾ ਕਰ ਲਵੋ	کلّ توں میں تُسانُوں وی آݨ دِتّا کریساں، اجّ گُزارہ کر گھِنو ਕੱਲ੍ਹ ਤੋਂ ਮੈਂ ਤੁਸਾਂ ਨੂੰ ਵੀ ਆਣ ਦਿੱਤਾ ਕਰੇਸਾਂ, ਅੱਜ ਗੁਜ਼ਾਰਾ ਕਰ ਘਿਨੋ	کلّ توں میں تُساں کی وی آݨی دیا کرساں، اجّ گُزارہ کری گھِنو ਕੱਲ੍ਹ ਤੋਂ ਮੈਂ ਤੁਸਾਂ ਕੀ ਵੀ ਆਣੀ ਦਿਆ ਕਰਸਾਂ, ਅੱਜ ਗੁਜ਼ਾਰਾ ਕਰੀ ਘਿਨੋ	کلّ توں میں تُساں آں وی آݨ دیا کرساں، اجّ گُزارہ کر گھِنو ਕੱਲ੍ਹ ਤੋਂ ਮੈਂ ਤੁਸਾਂ ਆਂ ਵੀ ਆਣ ਦਿਆ ਕਰਸਾਂ, ਅੱਜ ਗੁਜ਼ਾਰਾ ਕਰ ਘਿਨੋ	کلّ توں میں تُہاکُوں وی آݨ ڈِتّا کریساں، اجّ گُزارہ کر گھِنو ਕੱਲ੍ਹ ਤੋਂ ਮੈਂ ਤੁਹਾਕੂੰ ਵੀ ਆਣ ਡਿੱਤਾ ਕਰੇਸਾਂ, ਅੱਜ ਗੁਜ਼ਾਰਾ ਕਰ ਘਿਨੋ
Bring him along as well.	اوہنُوں وی نال لَے آوو ਓਹਨੂੰ ਵੀ ਨਾਲ ਲੈ ਆਵੋ	اوہنُوں وی نال گھِن آوو ਓਹਨੂੰ ਵੀ ਨਾਲ ਘਿਨ ਆਵੋ	اُسکی وی نال گھِنی اچھو ਉਸਕੀ ਵੀ ਨਾਲ ਘਿਨੀ ਅਛੋ	اُساں وی نال گھِن آؤ ਉਸਾਂ ਵੀ ਨਾਲ ਘਿਨ ਆਓ	اُوکُوں وی نال گھِن آوو ਊਕੂੰ ਵੀ ਨਾਲ ਘਿਨ ਆਵੋ
They took it from me as well	اُنھاں میرے کولُوں وی لَے لیا ਉਨ੍ਹਾਂ ਮੇਰੇ ਕੋਲੂੰ ਵੀ ਲੈ ਲਿਆ	اُنھاں مینڈھے کولُوں وی گھِن گھِدا ਉਨ੍ਹਾਂ ਮੈਂਢੇ ਕੋਲੂੰ ਵੀ ਘਿਨ ਘਿਦਾ	اُنھاں مہاڑے کولُوں وی گھِنی گھِدا ਉਨ੍ਹਾਂ ਮਹਾੜੇ ਕੋਲੂੰ ਵੀ ਘਿਨੀ ਘਿਦਾ	اُنھان مڑھے کولُوں وی گھِن گھِدا ਉਨ੍ਹਾਂ ਮੜ੍ਹੇ ਕੋਲੂੰ ਵੀ ਘਿਨ ਘਿਦਾ	اُنھاں میڈے کولُوں وی گھِن گھِدا ਉਨ੍ਹਾਂ ਮੈਂਡੇ ਕੋਲੂੰ ਵੀ ਘਿਨ ਘਿਦਾ
He is bringing	اوہ لیاندا پیا اے ਓਹ ਲਿਆਂਦਾ ਪਿਆ ਐ	اوہ اݨیدا پیا اے ਓਹ ਅਣੇਦਾ ਪਿਆ ਐ	اوہ آݨنا پیا اے ਓਹ ਆਣਨਾ ਪਿਆ ਐ	اوہ آݨدا پیا اے ਓਹ ਆਣਦਾ ਪਿਆ ਐ	اوہ اݨیدا پیا اے ਓਹ ਅਣੇਦਾ ਪਿਆ ਐ
We will also have to bring them back	اُنھاں نُوں واپس وی لیاوَݨا ہوسی ਉਨ੍ਹਾਂ ਨੂੰ ਵਾਪਿਸ ਵੀ ਲਿਆਵਣਾ ਹੋਸੀ	اُنھاں نُوں واپس وی آݨنا ہوسی ਉਨ੍ਹਾਂ ਨੂੰ ਵਾਪਿਸ ਵੀ ਆਣਨਾ ਹੋਸੀ	اُنھاں کی واپس وی آݨنا ہوسی ਉਨ੍ਹਾਂ ਕੀ ਵਾਪਿਸ ਵੀ ਆਣਨਾ ਹੋਸੀ	اُنھاں آں واپس وی آݨنا ہوسی ਉਨ੍ਹਾਂ ਆਂ ਵਾਪਿਸ ਵੀ ਆਣਨਾ ਹੋਸੀ	اُنھاں کُوں واپس وی آݨنا ہوسی ਉਨ੍ਹਾਂ ਕੂੰ ਵਾਪਿਸ ਵੀ ਆਣਨਾ ਹੋਸੀ
Eat it	کھا لَے ਖਾ ਲੈ	کھا گھِن ਖਾ ਘਿਨ	کھائی گھِن ਖਾਈ ਘਿਨ	کھا گھِن ਖਾ ਘਿਨ	کھا گھِن ਖਾ ਘਿਨ
Bring it Brought it	چا لیاؤ چا لیاندا ਚਾ ਲਿਆਓ ਚਾ ਲਿਆਂਦਾ	چا آݨو چا آندا ਚਾ ਆਣੋ ਚਾ ਆਂਦਾ	چائی آݨو چائی آندا ਚਾਈ ਆਣੋ ਚਾਈ ਆਂਦਾ	چا آݨو چا آندا ਚਾ ਆਣੋ ਚਾ ਆਂਦਾ	چا آݨو چا آندا ਚਾ ਆਣੋ ਚਾ ਆਂਦਾ
Take it Took it	چا لوو چا لیا ਚਾ ਲਵੋ ਚਾ ਲਿਆ	چا گھِنو چا گھِدا ਚਾ ਘਿਨੋ ਚਾ ਘਿਦਾ	چائی گھِنو چائی گھِدا ਚਾਈ ਘਿਨੋ ਚਾਈ ਘਿਦਾ	چا گھِنو چا گھِدا ਚਾ ਘਿਨੋ ਚਾ ਘਿਦਾ	چا گھِنو چا گھِدا ਚਾ ਘਿਨੋ ਚਾ ਘਿਦਾ

=== Retention of the irrgeular past tense ===
In Jatki Punjabi, as well as in Saraiki, the irregular Punjabi past tense form of verbs is retained when used with the verb Karnā, a feature that is not present in Eastern dialects such as Majhi, or even in other Lahnda varieties such as Pothohari and Hindko.

The irregular past tense is generally the same throughout the Punjabi dialects (e.g. khādhā, peetā, nahātā, dhotā, moyā, latthā, khalotā, ḍaṭṭhā, suttā, keetā, dittā, ghidā, seetā, baddhā).

Jatki does seem to have some additional ones as well, such as runnā for royā (cried) ḍiṭṭhā for vekhya (seen), and syātā for syāneā (recognized).

Examples:

English	Jatki	Majhi	Pothohari
Eat less rotis	روٹِیاں گھٹّ کھادھِیاں کرو ਰੋਟੀਆਂ ਘੱਟ ਖਾਧੀਆਂ ਕਰੋ	روٹِیاں گھٹّ کھایا کرو ਰੋਟੀਆਂ ਘੱਟ ਖਾਇਆ ਕਰੋ	روٹِیاں گھٹّ کھایا کرو ਰੋਟੀਆਂ ਘੱਟ ਖਾਇਆ ਕਰੋ
I will also be taking tea with you from tomorrow onwards	کلّ توں میں وی تُہاڈے نال چاء پِیتی کرساں ਕੱਲ੍ਹ ਤੋਂ ਮੈਂ ਵੀ ਤੁਹਾਡੇ ਨਾਲ ਚਾਹ ਪੀਤੀ ਕਰਸਾਂ	کلّ توں میں وی تُہاڈے نال چاء پیا کرانْگا ਕੱਲ੍ਹ ਤੋਂ ਮੈਂ ਵੀ ਤੁਹਾਡੇ ਨਾਲ ਚਾਹ ਪੀਆ ਕਰਾਂਗਾ	کلّ توں میں وی تُساں نال چاء پیا کرساں ਕੱਲ੍ਹ ਤੋਂ ਮੈਂ ਵੀ ਤੁਸਾਂ ਨਾਲ ਚਾਹ ਪੀਆ ਕਰਸਾਂ
You should also do it as such	تُسِیں وی اِنج/ایویں کِیتا کرو ਤੁਸੀਂ ਵੀ ਇੰਜ/ਐਵੇਂ ਕੀਤਾ ਕਰੋ	تُسِیں وی اِنج/ایویں کریا کرو ਤੁਸੀਂ ਵੀ ਇੰਜ/ਐਵੇਂ ਕਰਿਆ ਕਰੋ	تُساں وی اِسراں کریا کرو ਤੁਸਾਂ ਵੀ ਇਸਰਾਂ ਕਰਿਆ ਕਰੋ
Don't be giving me such tasks.	مینُوں اِنج دے/ایجہے کمّ نہ دِتّے کرو ਮੈਨੂੰ ਇੰਜ ਦੇ/ਅਜਿਹੇ ਕੱਮ ਨਾ ਦਿੱਤੇ ਕਰੋ	مینُوں اِنج دے/ایجِہے کمّ نہ دیا کرو ਮੈਨੂੰ ਇੰਜ ਦੇ/ਅਜਿਹੇ ਕੱਮ ਨਾ ਦਿਆ ਕਰੋ	میکی ایہے جِہے کمّ نہ دیا کرو ਮਿਕੀ ਇਹੇ ਜਿਹੇ ਕੱਮ ਨਾ ਦਿਆ ਕਰੋ
Tell him that he needs to eat and drink well.	اوہنُوں آکھو بہ اوہ کُجھ کھادھا پِیتا کرے ਓਹਨੂੰ ਆਖੋ ਬਾ ਓਹ ਕੁਝ ਖਾਧਾ ਪੀਤਾ ਕਰੇ	اوہنُوں آکھو کہ اوہ کُجھ کھایا پیا کرے ਓਹਨੂੰ ਆਖੋ ਕਿ ਓਹ ਕੁਝ ਖਾਇਆ ਪੀਆ ਕਰੇ	اُسکی آکھو کہ اوہ کُجھ کھایا پیا کرے ਉਸਕੀ ਆਖੋ ਕਿ ਓਹ ਕੁਝ ਖਾਇਆ ਪੀਆ ਕਰੇ
He wants that I should sleep on time	اوہ چاہندا اے میں ویلے نال سُتّا کراں ਉਹ ਚਾਹੰਦਾ ਐ ਮੈਂ ਵੇਲੇ ਨਾਲ ਸੁੱਤਾ ਕਰਾਂ	اوہ چاہندا اے میں ویلے نال سَونْیا کراں ਉਹ ਚਾਹੰਦਾ ਐ ਮੈਂ ਵੇਲੇ ਨਾਲ ਸੌਂਇਆ ਕਰਾਂ	اوہ چاہنا اے میں ویلے نال سیا کراں ਉਹ ਚਾਹਣਾ ਐ ਮੈਂ ਵੇਲੇ ਨਾਲ ਸਿਆ ਕਰਾਂ
Do talks of truth	گلّاں سچّیاں کیتِیاں کرو ਗੱਲਾਂ ਸੱਚੀਆਂ ਕੀਤੀਆਂ ਕਰੋ	گلّاں سچّیاں کریا کرو ਗੱਲਾਂ ਸੱਚੀਆਂ ਕਰਿਆ ਕਰੋ	گلّاں سچّیاں کریا کرو ਗੱਲਾਂ ਸੱਚੀਆਂ ਕਰਿਆ ਕਰੋ
You should listen to what I have to say	کدے میری گلّ وی سُن لئی کر کدے مینڈی گلّ وی سُن گھِدی کر ਕਦੇ ਮੇਰੀ ਗੱਲ ਵੀ ਸੁਣ ਲਈ ਕਰ ਕਦੇ ਮੈਂਡੀ ਗੱਲ ਵੀ ਸੁਣ ਘਿਦੀ ਕਰ	کدے میری گلّ وی سُن لیا کر ਕਦੇ ਮੇਰੀ ਗੱਲ ਵੀ ਸੁਣ ਲਿਆ ਕਰ	کدے مہاڑی گلّ وی سُنی گھِنیا کر ਕਦੇ ਮਹਾੜੀ ਗੱਲ ਵੀ ਸੁਣੀ ਘਿਨਿਆ ਕਰ

This is also observed with the verbs "Rakkhnā" and "Jāvnā/Vanjnā". Examples:

Asī̃ ohnū̃ ditti rakhie? (اسِیں اوہنُوں دِتّی رکھّیئے؟) instead of Asī̃ ohnū̃ dei rakhie? (اسِیں اوہنُوں دئی رکھّیئے؟)

(meaning, "Shall we keep on giving him?")

and

Oh keeti jāndā ae (اوہ کِیتی جاندا اے) instead of Oh kari jāndā ae (اوہ کری جاندا اے)

(meaning, "He keeps on doing")

Kalla maiiyon kamm keeti jaavan? instead of Kalla maiiyon kamm kari jaavan?

(meaning, "I alone am to keep on doing?)

This can be further observed with the verbs Aanā (to come) and Jānā/Vanjnā (to go), when used in this manner:

Ohnu ohndey pesay taan ditti aa (اوہنُوں اوہندے پیسے تاں دِتّی آ), meaning "Give him his money and come back"

Pesay taan mere ditti vanj (پیسے تاں میرے دِتّی ونج), meaning "Give my money as you go"

Pesay taan ditti veynda/jaanda (پیسے تاں دِتّی ویندا/جانا), meaning "You could have at least given the money as you went"

Mein hikk kamm keeti aavaan (میں ہِکّ کمّ نہ کیتی آواں), meaning "I'll be back after one task"

Mein veyndean do trae moṭian moṭian gallaan bas keeti jaavan (میں ویندیاں دو ترۓ گلّاں بس کیتی جاواں), meaning "I'm just going to say a few things as I go"

Ajj kujh baahroon na khaadhi aaveeye? (اجّ کُجھ باہرُوں نہ کھادی آوِیئے؟), meaning "Shouldn't we eat something from outside today?"

Aseen gall kareynde haaen, pehlon booha taan band keeti aa (اسِیں گلّ کریندے ہائیں، پہلوں بُوہا تاں بند کیتی آ), meaning "We will talk, first go close the door"

Booha band keeti jaaveen (بُوہا بند کیتی جاوِیں), meaning "Close the door when you go"

Oh ditti aaya karay (اوہ دِتّی آیا کرے), meaning "He can give (and come back)"

Oh ditti jaaya karay (اوہ دِتّی کرے), meaning "He can give give (while he is passing/leaving)"

Mein ḍiṭṭhi aavaan (میں ڈِتھّی آواں), meaning "I'll be back after a look"

Jaa nahaati aa (جا نہاتی آ), meaning "Go take a bath"

The words in bold would be "de", "kar", "khaa", "dekhya", and "nahaaya" in Standard Punjabi as well as in Urdu-Hindi translation.

With the verb Baiṭhnā:

"Hun taan mein keeti baitha aan" instead of "Hun taan mein karii baitha aan".

(meaning, "Now I have done it" [So now what?])

"Peeti baitha ae" instead of "Pee baitha ae"

(meaning, "He has drunk")

== See also ==
- Heer Ranjha
- Bar region

== Bibliography ==
- Bahl, Parmanand (1936). Étude de phonetique historique et experimentale des consonnes injectives du Multani, dialecte panjabi occidental. Paris: Adrien-Maisonneuve.
- Shackle, Christopher (1976). The Siraiki language of central Pakistan : a reference grammar. London: School of Oriental and African Studies.
- Wagha, Muhammad Ahsan (1997). The development of Siraiki language in Pakistan (Ph.D.). School of Oriental and African Studies. Archived from the original on 2017-02-14.
- Wilson, J. (1898). Grammar and Dictionary of Western Punjabi as spoken in the Shahpur District. Lahore: Punjab Government Press. OCLC 254680092.
- Jukes, A. (1900). Dictionary of the Jatki or Western Panjábi Language. Lahore: Religious Book and Tract Society. OCLC 1128095742.
