= Thali dialect =

Dialect of Saraiki

Thali
- Native to: Pakistan
- Region: northern Thal Desert, southwestern Khyber Paktunkhwa
- Language family: Indo-European: Indo-Iranian; Indo-Aryan; Northwestern; Lahnda; Saraiki; Thali

Language codes
- ISO 639-3: –
- Glottolog: thal1241
- Location within Pakistan
- Coordinates: 31°N 71°E

Thaḷī is a dialect of Saraiki language spoken in parts of the Pakistani provinces of Punjab and Khyber Pakhtunkhwa. Thali is an alternative term for Derawali dialect of Saraiki, although it has also been described as transitional between Saraiki and Jhangvi-Shahpuri. Its name derives from the Thal Desert, in which it is spoken.

The vocabulary of Thali is similar to Jhangvi-Shahpuri spoken to the east, but often the forms are closer to that of Saraiki.

== Geographical distribution ==
As defined in the Linguistic Survey of India, the Thali dialect is spoken in parts of the Sindh Sagar Doab south of the Salt Range from Pind Dadan Khan tehsil in Jhelum district in the northeast to present Layyah district in the south, and is also spoken west of the Indus in Bannu, Dera Ismail Khan and Tank districts of Khyber Pakhtunkhwa.

In Dera Ismail Khan District, it goes by the name of "Ḍerāwāl" or "Derawali", and in Mianwali and Bannu districts it is known as "Hindko" or "Mulkī". Prior to Partition, this was the predominant dialect used by Hindus in Bannu district. A dialect of Thali spoken in the northeast is known as "Kacchī". Inhabitants of Dera Ismail Khan District, where this dialect is spoken, variously identify their language as Hindko Saraiki. Likewise those living in Mianwali District primarily identify their language as Saraiki or Hindko.

== Bibliography ==
- Bahri, Hardev (1963). Lahndi Phonetics : with special reference to Awáṇkárí. Allahabad: Bharati Press.
- Grierson, George A. (1919). "Thali". Linguistic Survey of India. Vol. VIII, Part 1, Indo-Aryan family. North-western group. Specimens of Sindhī and Lahndā. Calcutta: Office of the Superintendent of Government Printing, India.
- Masica, Colin P. (1991). The Indo-Aryan languages. Cambridge language surveys. Cambridge University Press. ISBN 978-0-521-23420-7.
- Rensch, Calvin R. (1992). "The Language Environment of Hindko-Speaking People". In O'Leary, Clare F.; Rensch, Calvin R.; Hallberg, Calinda E. (eds.). Hindko and Gujari. Sociolinguistic Survey of Northern Pakistan. Islamabad: National Institute of Pakistan Studies, Quaid-i-Azam University and Summer Institute of Linguistics. ISBN 969-8023-13-5.
- Shackle, Christopher (1976). The Siraiki language of central Pakistan : a reference grammar. London: School of Oriental and African Studies.
- Singh, Atam (1970). "An introduction to the dialects of Punjabi". Pākhā sanjam. 3 (1). ISSN 0556-4417. The account of Thali here is based entirely on Grierson's Linguistic Survey of India.
- Wagha, Muhammad Ahsan (1997). The development of Siraiki language in Pakistan (Ph.D.). School of Oriental and African Studies. Archived from the original on 2017-02-14. (requires registration).
