= Jatki language =

Indo-Aryan language name

Jatki, Jadgali, and other related terms have sometimes been used to refer to one or another of the Indo-Aryan languages spoken in Balochistan and neighbouring parts of Sindh and Punjab.

- Jatki (Punjabi pronunciation: [ˈd͡ʒə.ʈə̆.kiː]), also called Jaangli or Baar di boli, is a term collectively applied to a group of Lahnda Punjabi dialects spoken in western Punjab. It consists of the Jhangvi and Shahpuri dialects as well as the rest of the Lahnda varieties spoken between Majha and South Punjab, and is sometimes said to include Dhanni. It is spoken in the broader Bar region, including the following districts: Sargodha, Mandi Bahauddin, Hafizabad (western parts), Chiniot, Jhang, Faisalabad, Toba Tek Singh, Layyah, Okara, Sahiwal, Pakpattan, Bahawalnagar, Khanewal and Vehari. The term was also used to refer to Saraiki historically.

The Glottolog codes for the dialects of Jatki (Western Punjabi) are:

- Jatki (Western Punjabi): jatki1238
- Jhangvi: jang1253
- Shahpuri: shah1266
- Jatki was used in 19th-century British sources for what would later be called Saraiki, as well as for Khetrani. Jaṭkī is also attested in local use in Balochistan as a name for these two languages as well as for Sindhi. Jataki was used by 19th-century British writer Richard Francis Burton for a variety of the Punjabi language.
- Jakati is a possibly spurious name used in the Ethnologue encyclopedia for either a Romani (Gypsies) variety of Ukraine, or for the Inku language of Afghanistan.
- Jaḍgālī (Jadgali pronunciation: [dʒaɖɡaːliː]) is the common name for the Jadgali language spoken in Iranian Balochistan and western parts of Pakistani Balochistan. Related to the above are Jagdālī (جگدالی), and Jaghdali, in use among the Balochi speakers of Dera Ghazi Khan District of southwestern Punjab for the Punjabi variety spoken there. The Arabic terms az-Zighālī and az-Zijālī refer to speakers of the Jadgali language in the diaspora in Oman and the United Arab Emirates.

Jatki/Jātki: are two small distinct dialects of Sindhi language, one is spoken by Sindhi Jats of southern Sindh. The other is spoken by some northern Sindhi Jats, which is also spoken in Balochistan province.

== Bibliography ==
- Abdul Haq, Mehr (1967). Multānī zabān aur us kā Urdū se taʻalluq (in Urdu). Bahāvalpūr: Urdū Akādamī.
- Delforooz, Behrooz Barjasteh (2008). "A sociolinguistic survey among the Jagdal in Iranian Balochistan". In Jahani, Carina; Korn, Agnes; Titus, Paul Brian (eds.). The Baloch and others: linguistic, historical and socio-political perspectives on pluralism in Balochistan. Wiesbaden: Reichert Verlag. pp. 23–44. ISBN 978-3-89500-591-6.
- Elfenbein, Josef H. (1990). An Anthology of classical and modern Balochi literature. Vol. II: Glossary. Wiesbaden: O. Harrassowitz. ISBN 3447030305.
- Hammarström, Harald; Forkel, Robert; Haspelmath, Martin (2020). "Inku". Glottolog 4.2.1. Jena, Germany: Max Planck Institute for the Science of Human History.
- Masica, Colin P. (1991). The Indo-Aryan languages. Cambridge language surveys. Cambridge University Press. ISBN 978-0-521-23420-7.
- Wagha, Muhammad Ahsan (1990). The Siraiki language : its growth and development. Islamabad: Derawar Publications.
