= Ahiri language =

Ahiri may refer to either of the following Indo-Aryan language varieties of India:

- Ahīrī, a Bhili dialect spoken in Kutch, Gujarat
- Ahīrī or Ahirī, another name for the Malvi language of Uttar Pradesh and Madhya Pradesh

== See also ==
- Ahirani language, also known as Khandeshi, spoken in Maharashtra
- Ahirwati dialect, spoken in south Haryana and north Rajasthan

== Bibliography ==
- Masica, Colin P. (1991). The Indo-Aryan languages. Cambridge language surveys. Cambridge University Press. pp. 421–2. ISBN 978-0-521-23420-7.
