= Lahnda =

Group of Indo-Aryan language varieties

- Western Punjabi
- (classification disputed)
- Geographic distribution: West Punjab; Hazara; Azad Jammu and Kashmir
- Ethnicity: Punjabis (Note: including all ethnographic groups such as Hindkowans, Paharis, and Saraikis)
- Native speakers: 118 million (2025) (Note: Includes almost all dialects indigenous to Pakistan, including Majhi; but excludes the Eastern Punjabi dialects which are indigenous to India)
- Linguistic classification: Indo-European: Indo-Iranian; Indo-Aryan; Northwestern; Punjabi; Lahnda
- Subdivisions: classification disputed: Dhanni (Note: The dialect's status is that of being transitional between Western Punjabi and Central Punjabi.); Hindko; Inku †; Jhangvi; Majhi (Note: Although regarded as a separate group as Central Punjabi by many, the Pakistani subdialects of Majhi are regarded by Ethnologue and others to be included in the Lahnda group.); Pahari-Pothwari/Pakistani Pahari; Sarazi; Saraiki; Shahpuri; Thali

Language codes
- ISO 639-2 / 5: lah
- ISO 639-3: lah

Lahnda (Punjabi: Laehndā, pronounced [lɛ˦n.d̪äː], lit. 'western'), (Note: /ˈlɑːndə/; Shahmukhi: لہندا, Gurmukhi: ਲਹਿੰਦਾ) also known as Lahndi or Western Punjabi, is a group of Indo-Aryan language varieties, spoken in the Punjab, Hazara, and Azad Kashmir regions of Pakistan. It is defined in the ISO 639 standard as a "macrolanguage" or as a "series of dialects" by other authors. (Note: For the difficulties in assigning the labels "language" and "dialect", see Shackle (1979) for Punjabi and Masica (1991, pp. 23–27) for Indo-Aryan generally.) Its validity as a linguistic genetic grouping is not certain. The terms "Lahnda" and "Western Punjabi" are exonyms employed by linguists, and are not used by the speakers themselves.

Lahnda includes the following language varieties: Saraiki (spoken mostly in southern Pakistani Punjab by about 26 million people); the Jatki Punjabi dialects (spoken by ~40 million people across the Bar region of western Punjab); the diverse varieties of Hindko (with almost five million speakers in north-western Punjab and neighbouring regions of Khyber Pakhtunkhwa, especially Hazara); Pahari/Pothwari (with 3.5 million speakers predominantly on the Pothohar Plateau of northern Punjab, as well as Azad Kashmir and parts of Indian-administered Jammu and Kashmir); Khetrani (transitional with Sindhi, 20,000 speakers in Balochistan); and Inku (a possibly extinct language of Afghanistan). Ethnologue also subsumes under Lahnda a group of varieties that it labels as "Western Punjabi" (ISO 639-3 code: pnb) – the Majhi dialects transitional between Lahnda and Eastern Punjabi; these are spoken by about 66 million people. Glottolog, however, regards only the Shahpuri, Dhanni and Jatki dialects as "Western Punjabi" within the "Greater Panjabic" family, distinguishing it from the Lahnda language varieties ("Hindko-Siraiki" and "Paharic").

== Name ==
Lahnda means "western" in Punjabi. It was coined by William St. Clair Tisdall (in the form Lahindā) probably around 1890 and later adopted by a number of linguists — notably George Abraham Grierson — for a dialect group that had no general local name. This term has currency only among linguists.

== Development ==
Baba Farid (c. 1188–1266), a celebrated and revered Punjabi Sufi saint of the 12th century, composed poetry in the Lahnda lect.

Mian Muhammad Bakhsh (c. 1830 – 1907) is another Punjabi poet who composed poetry in a mixture of both the Eastern and Lahnda varieties of Punjabi.

Saraiki (in the south) and Hindko (in the northwest) have been cultivated as literary standards. The development of the standard written Saraiki began in the 1960s. The national census of Pakistan has counted Saraiki speakers since 1981, and Hindko speakers from 2017, prior to which both were represented by Punjabi in general.

== Classification ==
Lahnda has several traits that distinguish it from other Punjabi linguistic groups, such as a future tense in -s-. Like Sindhi, Saraiki retains breathy-voiced consonants, has developed implosives, and lacks tone. Hindko, also called Panjistani or (ambiguously) Pahari, is more like Central Punjabi in this regard, though the equivalent of the low-rising tone of Central Punjabi is a high-falling tone in Peshawar Hindko.

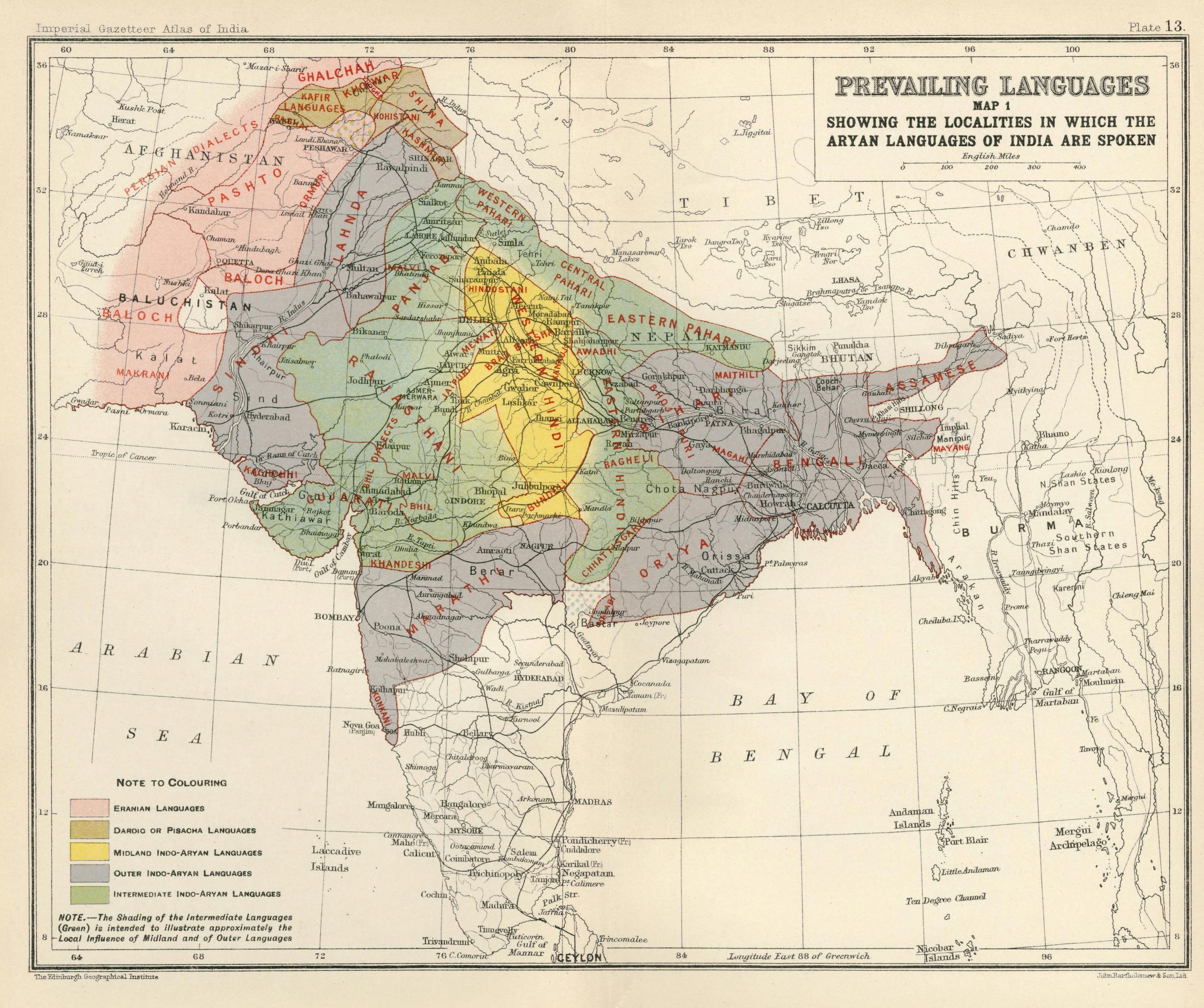
Lahnda depicted on a linguistic map of India, showing the areas where Indo-Aryan languages are spoken, published in the 'Imperial Gazetteer of India' (Vol. XXVI, Atlas; 1931 revised edition; plate no. 13).

Sindhi and Punjabi groups (including Lahnda) form a dialect continuum with no clear-cut boundaries. Ethnologue classifies the western forms of Central Punjabi and the dialects transitional between Lahnda and Central Punjabi as Lahnda, so that the Lahnda–Eastern Punjabi isogloss approximates the Pakistani–Indian border.

== Script ==
Lahndi-speaking Sikhs employ the Gurmukhi script for recording the language rather than the Perso-Arabic-based Shahmukhi script.

== Bibliography ==
- Javaid, Umbreen (2004). "Saraiki political movement: its impact in south Punjab" (PDF). Journal of Research (Humanities). 40 (2). Lahore: Department of English Language & Literature, University of the Punjab: 45–55. (This PDF contains multiple articles from the same issue.)
- Masica, Colin P. (1991). The Indo-Aryan languages. Cambridge language surveys. Cambridge University Press. ISBN 978-0-521-23420-7.
- Rahman, Tariq (1997). "Language and Ethnicity in Pakistan". Asian Survey. 37 (9): 833–839. doi:10.2307/2645700. JSTOR 2645700.
- Shackle, Christopher (1977). "Siraiki: A Language Movement in Pakistan". Modern Asian Studies. 11 (3): 379–403. doi:10.1017/s0026749x00014190. ISSN 0026-749X. JSTOR 311504. S2CID 144829301.
- Shackle, Christopher (1979). "Problems of classification in Pakistan Panjab". Transactions of the Philological Society. 77 (1): 191–210. doi:10.1111/j.1467-968X.1979.tb00857.x. ISSN 0079-1636.
