= Modern Standard Punjabi =

Standardized form of the Punjabi language used in India

Modern Standard Punjabi (MSP) is a standardized form of the Punjabi language used in Punjab, India. Punjabi was originally a heterogeneous language which was later formalised and standardised by Christian missionaries and Sikh revivalists. The standardized register's evolution during the 20th century was closely related to the Sikhs. In recent times, it is exhibiting increased Sanskritization and decreased Persianization. The standard register has been described by linguists such as Harjeet Singh Gill and Henry A. Gleason, Duni Chandra, and Kali Charan Bahl. The standard language is used in education, media, and literature. While it is often misunderstood and oversimplified as being based upon Majhi (especially the variety originally spoken in the Lahore, Amritsar, and Gurdaspur districts), it exhibits a variety of dialectal influences, including Lahndi, Malwai, and Doabi. The Standard Punjabi used in India and Pakistan has slight differences. In India, it excludes many of the dialect-specific features of Majhi. In Pakistan, the standard is closer to the Majhi spoken in the urban parts of Lahore.

== Terminology ==
Various names are used to refer to standard Punjabi, including Taksali Punjabi, Kendri Punjabi, or Markazi Punjabi.

== Characteristics ==
A unified standard Punjabi orthography is yet to be realized. As per Bahl, Modern Standard Punjabi's spelling is chaotic. Individual scholars and institutions have attempted to standardize its spelling. The register consists of a literary standard and colloquial standard, which differ from each other. Standard Punjabi is tonal. It mostly relies upon classical Sanskrit to enrich lexical stock.

== History ==
=== Pre-colonial ===
In pre-colonial Punjab, there was no standardised form of the Punjabi language (with it being primarily oral and lacking a formal grammar and lexicon) but rather several dialects and variants were utilised and built upon a linguistically heterogenous literary tradition. The scenario is described as a diglossia, where peoples' language varied depending on setting, such as if at home or in the bazaar, and medium, whether written or spoken. There was a difference between classical and vernacular registers. The inhabitants likely had degrees of intelligibility with neighbouring languages due to shared linguistic features and roots. The region was historically influenced by a variety of Punjabi dialects and other languages, such as Persian, Arabic, Sanskrit, Kashmiri, Balochi, Pashto, Khariboli, and Braj. A Sanskritic background became influence by Perso-Islamicate culture. A variety of scripts were in use for a variety of purposes, such as Perso-Arabic, Gurmukhi, and Landa, with spellings varying for words based upon individual preference or region. Persian was historically the administrative language of the Mughals and their successor states, including the Sikhs. The British East India Company replaced Persian for administration with English and local Indian vernaculars in 1837. Punjab was annexed by the British in 1849.

=== Colonial ===
Due to the lack of a standardised register of Punjabi, a colonial-era belief that Punjabi was spoken by illiterates (due to its literary tradition being primarily oral and folklore-based rather than a written tradition), and its seemingly similar grammatical structure and vocabulary with Urdu, Urdu was selected as the administrative language of British Punjab rather than Punjabi. Punjabi was regarded by the early colonial administration as a dialect of Urdu. Some British administrators, such as Robert Needham Cust in the 1860s, believed that translating the Bible into a language would help standardise the language's grammar and lead to the development of a rich literary tradition. According to Jeffrey M. Diamond, Christian missionaries had a better understanding of Punjabi linguistics than colonial administrators. Christian missionary institutions, such as the Serampore Mission Press and especially the Ludhiana Mission Press, played a role in the standardisation of Punjabi sets. John Newton's 1851 grammatical work on Punjabi provided the initial impetus for the formation of a standard Punjabi, as he promoted "explicit grammatical structures" for the language, Romanisations, and particular rules (such as for syntax) and styles. The press worked mostly in a standardised form of an eastern Punjabi dialect spoken in the Ludhiana region, which was regarded as 'European Standard Punjabi'. Grierson (1916) regarded the Majhi of Lahore and Amritsar as "pure" or "standard" Punjabi. Despite early attempts by Christian missionaries to formulate a Punjabi standard, regional variations persisted for the most part and the language was not fully standardised. As per Shackle, standard Punjabi did not take true shape until the 20th century under the Sikh reformers.

According to Christopher Shackle, the standardization of Punjabi in Gurmukhi by Sikhs can be traced back to Sikh authors of the 1890s. Modern Standard Punjabi arose in circa 1900 primarily as a result of a "Punjabi-Gurmukhi-Sikh equation", with proponents highlighting the Gurmukhi script's role. Modern Standard Punjabi arose in Indian Punjab as a result of the Singh Sabha and Punjabi Suba movements, associated with a revitalization of Sikhism. Punjabi underwent a separate standardization process from Hindustani, which developed into standard Urdu and Hindi, or the case of Bengali. It developed in an environment where Urdu was the official language while the Arya Samaj promoted Hindi. Shackle divides its evolution into three phases:

1. Formative (c. 1900–1914): promoted by reformist Sikhs, especially Bhai Vir Singh, as a religious need. Much basis for the standardized form was initially centred on the sacred language of the Sikhs. Dialectal influences included Majhi and Lahnda.
2. Overlapping (c. 1914 – 1947): usage shifts from a mainly religious purpose to non-religious writings around the time of the First World War. The language itself is characterized as Majha norms with Lahnda influence but also influence from Urdu and English due to the educational background of authors of the period. Writers who exhibit this stage include Teja Singh, Nanak Singh, Mohan Singh, Kartar Singh Duggal, and Kulvant Singh Virk.
3. Post-independence (1947 onwards): usage shifts from mostly spirituality and poetry to becoming used as a language of education and government, being cultivated by universities and the state government's language department, especially post-trifucation. It bears more influence from eastern Punjab dialects, such as Malwai and Doabi, owing to the shifting of the Punjabi Sikh and Hindu populations from Western Punjab to Eastern Punjab after 1947, where Eastern Punjabi dialects are spoken. It is also characterized by decreased Persianization, which differs it from Punjabi spoken in Pakistan. Some neologisms have been coined from Punjabi tadbhavas, however there is a trend of Sanskritization (tatsamas).

Meanwhile, Duni Chandra iterated that MSP arose in the .

=== Post-independence ===
The usage of standardized Punjabi has led to a decline in the usage of dialectal Punjabi.

Due to the Punjabi diaspora, interest in formulating a standardised approach to studying and learning Punjabi was invested in by a number scholars and institutions in the United States, Canada, the United Kingdom, and Singapore.

== Situation in Pakistan ==
In Pakistan, there have been proposals for a Pakistani Standard Punjabi. In December 1951, Faqeer Muhammad Faqeer advocated for the Pakistani standard to be based upon the dialect of the Gujranwala region due to its central location and literary history. Later, Sardar Muhammad Khan made the case for the usage of the Lahndi variety spoken in Warzirabad as the basis for a Pakistani Standard Punjabi. He also advocated for the usage of Perso-Arabic script. Khan believed that the standard Punjabi used in India was at risk of Hindization, with him making the following polemical statement:

Nowadays the literary Punjabi of the Hindus and Sikhs living in East Punjab is slipping dangerously into the mold of modern Hindi. Mohan Singh, at a session of the Punjabi Society of Government College in Lahore in 1930 had declared that Muslims, by mixing Arabic and Persian with Urdu had created a language that should be named ‘afārdū. ... But if we look at the present situation in East Punjab it does not seem that Hindi is influenced by Punjabi to the point that one can call it p’hindī. On the contrary we are witnessing the gradual transformation of Punjabi into hanumān Panjābī.

— Sardar Muhammad Khan

Waqar Ambalvi supported an Urduized form of Punjabi, which he termed Pāk Panjābī ("Pure/Pakistani Punjabi"), which incorporated Urduisms, considering it "beautiful" and "flavourful", however purists like Sardar Khan disapproved of this approach. As per K. R. Dikshit and Jutta K. Dikshit (2025), the standard Punjabi used in Pakistan is based upon the dialect of the districts of Lahore, Gujranwala, Sheikhupura, Kasur, Sialkot, Narowal, Gujrat, Okara and neighbouring districts.
