= Dhani dialect =

Dialect of Punjabi

Dhani
- دھنّی
- Pronunciation: [təˈni]
- Native to: Pakistan
- Region: Rawalpindi Division
- Ethnicity: Punjabis
- Language family: Indo-European: Indo-Iranian; Indo-Aryan; Northwestern; Punjabi; Lahnda (Western Punjabi); Dhani

Language codes
- ISO 639-3: –
- Glottolog: dhan1272

Dhani or Dhanni (دھنّی; pronounced [ˈd̥ə˥˩n.niː]) is a western dialect of the Punjabi language spoken in the southern region of the Pothohar Plateau in Punjab, Pakistan. It is predominantly spoken in the Chakwal and Talagang districts; as well as in the southern portions of Attock and Jhelum districts. Its name is derived from Dhan valley, located 35 km away from Rawalpindi. It has many subdialects including Sohāī̃ (سوہائیِں), spoken west of the Soan River, in the tehsils of Fateh Jang and Pindi Gheb in Attock District.

== Classification ==
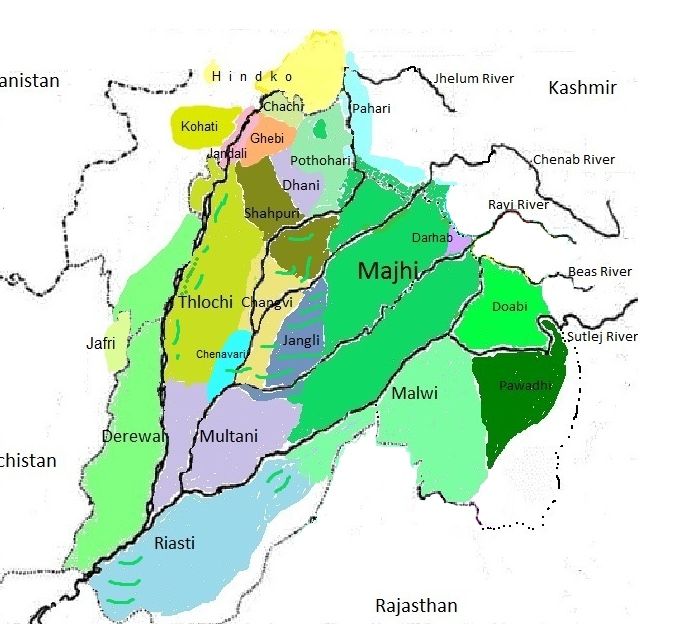
Map of Punjabi dialects and languages, including Dhani in the north-west

In the 1920s G.A. Grierson in his Linguistic Survey of India called this group North-Western Lahnda. The glotlog code for Dhani:

- dhan1272

Grierson has distinguished three forms of Lahndi:

- North-Western dialects consisting of (Hindko, Sohain, Dhanni, etc.)
- North-Eastern dialects (Pothowari, Chibali, Awankari, Ghebi, etc.)
- Southern Dialects (Shahpuri, Jhangi, Multani, Derawali, Thali, etc.)

Bahri, H. (1962). Lahndi Phonology, with Special Reference to Awánkárí.

== Dialect speaking areas ==
Chakwal district of Punjab Province of Pakistan and neighboring districts speak this dialect.

- Chakwal District
- Talagang District
- Jhelum District (in southern parts)
- Attock District (in southern parts)

== Bibliography ==
- Shackle, Christopher (1980). "Hindko in Kohat and Peshawar". Bulletin of the School of Oriental and African Studies. 43 (3): 482–510. doi:10.1017/S0041977X00137401. ISSN 0041-977X. S2CID 129436200.
