= Colin Masica =

American scholar of Indo-Aryan languages (1931–2022)

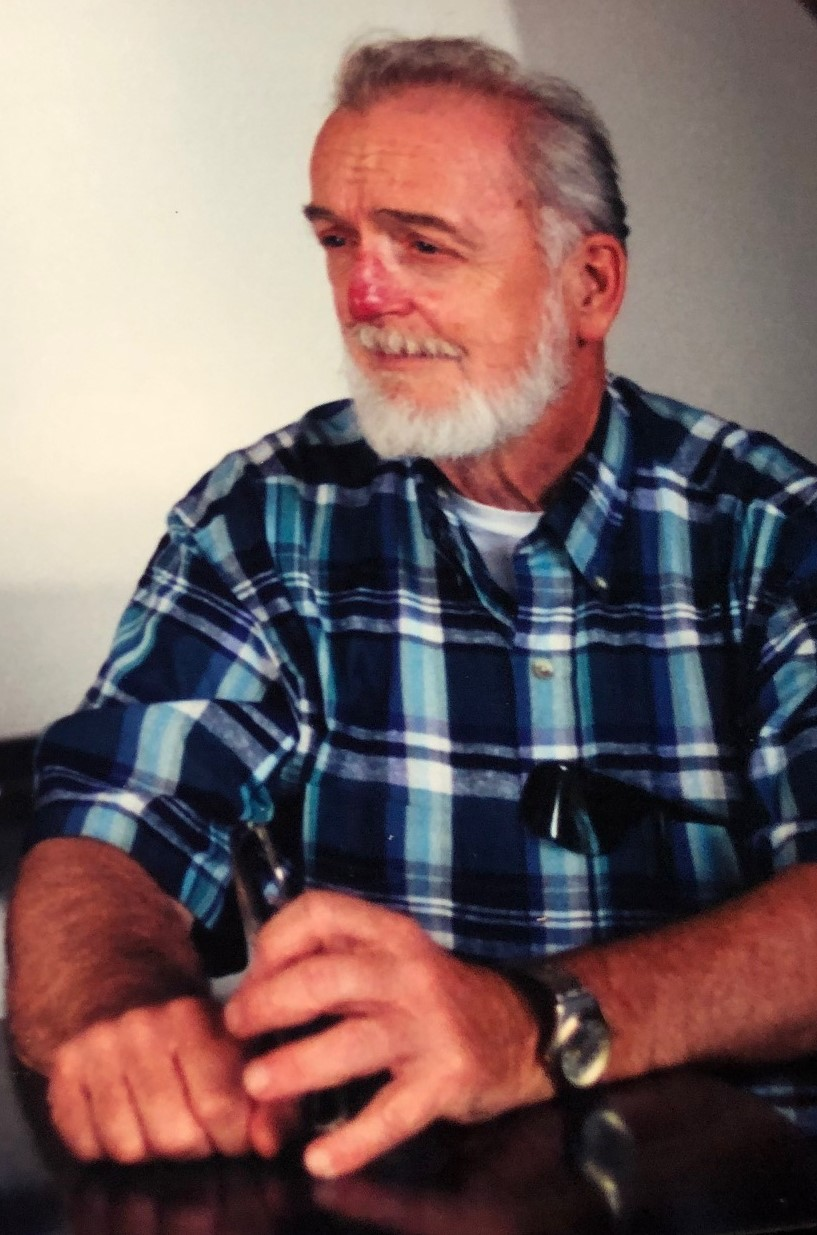
Colin P. Masica

Colin Paul Masica (June 13, 1931 – February 23, 2022) was an American linguist who was professor emeritus in the Department of South Asian Languages and Civilizations and the Department of Linguistics at the University of Chicago. Besides being a specialist in Indo-Aryan languages, much of his work was on the typological convergence of languages belonging to different linguistic families in South Asia and beyond (see below), more broadly on this phenomenon in general, and on possible explanations for and implications of it in connection with both linguistic and cultural history.

At the University of Chicago, he taught Hindi at all levels, and occasionally other South Asian languages, along with North Indian cultural history and literature, for three decades. He published on both Indo-Aryan and Dravidian languages. His magna opera are Defining a Linguistic Area: South Asia and The Indo-Aryan Languages. The latter surveyed more than a century of linguistic research on the many Indo-Aryan languages and dialects of North India, Pakistan, Afghanistan, Nepal, and Sri Lanka. It was written as part of the University of Cambridge's surveys of the language families of the world. The former has had a profound influence on the study of India as a linguistic area.

In his seminal Defining a Linguistic Area: South Asia and other writings, Masica drew on studies and grammars of both South Asian and non-South Asian languages by various European (especially Russian), British, American, Indian and other Asian scholars, to demonstrate the typological parallels among the Indo-Aryan, Dravidian, Munda, Tibeto-Burman languages of South Asia and with the Iranian and Altaic languages (including Korean and Japanese) of Central and Northeast Asia, in comparison with types prevalent beyond this zone.

Masica was born in Wahpeton, North Dakota. He served in the United States Army. Masica went to the University of Minnesota and to University of Pennsylvania. After retiring, he lived in Boscobel, Wisconsin, where he owned a farm. He died in Fennimore, Wisconsin, on February 23, 2022, at the age of 90.

== Publications ==
- Masica, Colin: "Postverbal subjects in Telugu and other languages", pages 246–73 in Masica, Colin (2007). Old and New Perspectives on South Asian Languages: Grammar and Semantics. Motilal Banarsidass Publishers. ISBN 978-81-208-3208-4.
- Masica, Colin: "The definition and significance of linguistic areas", pages 205–67 in Singh, Rajendra (2004). The Yearbook of South Asian Languages and Linguistics. Walter de Gruyter. ISBN 978-3-11-017989-7.
- Masica, Colin: Alternative embedding strategy in Gujarati. In P. J. Mistry and Bharati Modi, Eds. Vidyopāsanā: Studies in honor of Harivallabh C. Bhayāni. Mumbai-Ahmedabad: Image Publications. 1999. pp. 135–56.
- Masica, Colin (1993). The Indo-Aryan Languages. Cambridge University Press. ISBN 978-0-521-29944-2.
- Masica, Colin: Definiteness marking in South Asian languages. In Krishnamurti, B., Colin P. Masica, Anjani K. Sinha. South Asian Languages: Structure, Convergence and Diglossia Delhi: Motilal Banarsidass. 1986. pp. 123–46.
- Masica, Colin: Aryan and Non-Aryan elements in North Indian agriculture. In Deshpande, M. M., and P. E. Hook, Eds. Aryan and Non-Aryan in India. Ann Arbor: Karoma. 1979. pp. 55–151.
- Masica, Colin (2005). Defining a Linguistic Area: South Asia. Orient Blackswan. ISBN 978-81-8028-022-1.
- Zide, N. H.; Masica, Colin; Bahl, K. C. (1965). A Premchand Reader. South Asia Language and Area Center, University of Chicago.
