= Christopher Shackle =

British academic

Christopher Shackle, FBA (born 4 March 1942) is Emeritus Professor of Modern Languages of South Asia at the University of London.

== Life and career ==
Christopher Shackle was born on 4 March 1942. He was educated at Haileybury and Imperial Service College, and went up to Merton College, Oxford in 1959 to read Oriental Studies, graduating with a first class degree in 1963. He then went on to study as a postgraduate at St Antony's College.

In 1969 Shackle took up an appointment as a Lecturer in Urdu and Punjabi at SOAS University of London, a position he held for the next 10 years. In January 1979 he moved to Birkbeck College to become Reader in Modern Languages of South Asia, returning in 1985 to SOAS as Professor of Modern Languages of South Asia.

He is furthermore the head of the Urdu department at the School of Oriental and African Studies of London, Project Leader at the Arts and Humanities Research Council's Centre for Asian and African Literatures, and a member of the Centre of South Asian Studies.

He has written many books, and published over 19 book chapters and journal articles in the field of Urdu literature. He served as Head of Department from 1983 to 1987 and as Pro-Director of SOAS from 1997 until 2003. He also served as a Humanities jury member for the Infosys Prize 2020.

In 2021, his translation of the classical Punjabi poet Bulleh Shah was published by Harvard University Press.

== Awards ==
- Fellow of the British Academy (elected 1990)
- Pakistan's highest award for the arts, the Sitara-i-Imtiaz (2004)
- The Royal Asiatic Society Award (2006)
- Latif Award (2019)

== Selected publications ==
- Teach Yourself Punjabi
- The Siraiki Language of Central Pakistan; A Reference Grammar
- From Wuch to Southern Lahnda: A Century of Siraiki Studies in English
- (with A. Mandair) Teachings of the Sikh Gurus: Selections from the Sikh Scriptures, 214 pp., Routledge (UK & US). ISBN 0-415-26604-1. 2005.
- Siraiki Marsiya, 94 pp. Bazm-e Saqafat (Pakistan). ISBN none. 2003.
- (with D. J. Matthews, S. Husain) Urdu Literature, 288 pp., Alhamra (Pakistan). ISBN 969-516-119-7. 2003.
- (with J. Majeed) Hali's Musaddas: The Flow and Ebb of Islam, 262 pp., Oxford University Press (Delhi). ISBN 0-19-564091-8. 1997.
- Edited books: 2003. SOAS Since the Sixties, 185 pp. SOAS (UK). ISBN 0-7286-0353-5.
- Teachings of Khawaja Farid (Translation of Isharat-i-Faridi), 1978: Bazm-i-Saqafat-Multan
- Fifty Poems of Khawaja Farid: Translation in English Verse of Poems of Khawaja Farid, published 1973: Bazm-i-Saqafat-Multan Pakistan.
