= Punjabi dialects =

Dialects of the Punjabi language

Punjabi
- Panjabi
- Geographic distribution: Punjab, Azad Jammu and Kashmir, Jammu and Kashmir, Khyber Pakhtunkhwa, Haryana, Rajasthan and Himachal Pradesh
- Ethnicity: Punjabis
- Linguistic classification: Indo-European: Indo-Iranian; Indo-Aryan; Northwestern; Punjabi
- Early form: Old Punjabi (Note: Sources:)
- Subdivisions: Eastern Punjabi (Charhda); Western Punjabi (Lahnda)
- Writing system: Gurmukhi, Shahmukhi

Language codes
- ISO 639-1: pa
- ISO 639-2 / 5: pan, lah
- Glottolog: lahn1241 Greater Panjabic
- Linguasphere: 59-AAF-e

The Punjabi language has a variety of dialects (bōlīyāṁ) which form a dialect continuum and are primarily subdivided into two groups: Eastern Punjabi in the east, and Lahnda (Western Punjabi) in the west. The dialects vary based on geographical, cultural, and historical factors. Punjabi may also be considered as a pluricentric language with more than one standard variety (mi'ārī bōlī).

There was a historic disagreement on whether they form part of a single language group within the Indo-Aryan language family, with early classifications assigning the western dialects to the Northwestern zone and the eastern ones to the Central zone; but broadly all modern classifications agree on their forming a single group within the Northwestern zone. A number of classification schemes have been devised by individual scholars and linguistic institutions regarding the Punjabi dialects.

== Classification ==
Map of Punjabi dialects

Nearly all scholars agree that Punjabi is an Indo-Aryan language, (Note: Prem Prakash Singh, Kala Singh Bedi, Sant Singh Sekhon, Vidya Bhasker Arun, Piara Singh Padam, and Duni Chand all supported the classification of Punjabi as Indo-Aryan. Only the fringe opinion of Ainul Haq Faridkhoti disagrees with Punjabi being an Indo-Aryan language, based upon flawed reasoning as per S. S. Joshi (1998).) however the precise Prakrit or Apabrahmsha that Punjabi derived from is disputed. An attempt to enumerate and geographically describe the spoken areas of Punjabi dialects was undertaken by the Linguistic Survey of India, chiefly by George A. Grierson. Greierson made a distinction between what he called "Lahnda" (spoken in western Punjab, which he grouped with Sindhi) from "Punjabi proper" (spoken in central and eastern Punjab, which he grouped with Western Hindi). Grierson's demarcation of an outer and inner sub-branches of Indo-Aryan was critiqued later by Chatterjee in 1926. Cardona (1974) devised a new classification scheme of Modern (New) Indo-Aryan, placing Punjabi (incl. Lahndi) and Sindhi in a northwestern-zone.

The basis for classifying Punjabi dialects is not purely linguistic as political, social, and emotive factors play a role as well. Furthermore, the term "dialect" is defined variously in linguistics with no clear dilineation between what constitutes a dialect versus a language. Other terms used in linguistics include accents, registers, styles, varieties, and lects. The word "language" is often used to refer to standardised languages while "dialect" often refers to non-standard varieties. The words "variety" and "lect" refer to a specific form of a language or language cluster. According to Bahl, the dialect classification of Punjabi attracts socio-political controversies.

The Punjabi dialects are divided into two broad classifications: Eastern and Western (Lahnda) dialects. The Lahnda of western Punjab is often differentiated from what is termed "Punjabi proper" that is spoken in central and eastern Punjab. Lahnda is internally diverse, consisting of North-Western (Hindko, Peshawari), North-Eastern (Pothwari/Pothohari, Awankari), and Southern (Siraiki or Multani) divisions. The number of dialects is not in agreement and varies by source. Most Indian Punjabi scholars (such as Jodh Singh, Duni Chandra, and Mangat Bhardwaj) reject Grierson's earlier classification which excluded Lahandi varieties from Punjabi. According to Mangat Bhardwaj, Eastern Punjabi is more similar to Lahnda than it is to Hindi-Urdu. He further states: "Most native speakers of both the eastern and the western dialects of Panjabi believe that they speak the same language". Harkirat Singh takes a similar position regarding the Lahnda-Punjabi distinction.

However, Lahnda is a diverse grouping and lects once subsumed under its label have since been recognised as more distinct varieties, such as Saraiki. Meanwhile, Hindko is often also placed under the Lahnda label but the Hindko varieties are internally diverse and differ from one another. What was originally termed Northern Lahnda is now known generally as Hindko while what was formerly called Southern Lahnda is now called Saraiki. In Pakistan, Hindko and Saraiki are recognized as independent languages. In 1981 Pakistani census classified Saraiki as a separate language from Punjabi. Saraiki is spoken by around 12–20 million people. The Saraiki movement or South Punjab movement advocates for a separate identity for the language and is characterized as a political demand, coming to the forefront during elections. This linguistic separatist movement involving Saraiki arose in the 1960s, being motivated by cultural, economic, political, and literary factors. "Saraiki" was adopted as a term for the language by the movement, replacing earlier labels like Multani and Riyasati. However, a counter-push against this asserts that Saraiki is a dialect of Punjabi. Shackle states that Saraiki is linguistically intermediate between Sindhi and Punjabi. Shackle considers Hindko to be intermediary between Punjabi and Saraiki. Hindko and Pothwari may also be viewed as distinct languages. In India, the speakers of Dogri and other Pahari languages campaigned for a separate linguistic identity. Some sources include Bagri as a dialect.

=== Standard Punjabi ===
- Modern Standard Punjabi, used in Indian Punjab and was initially primarily based upon Majhi and Lahnda but later bore influence from eastern dialects such as Malwai and Doabi.
- Pakistani Standard Punjabi, various proposals have been made for the formation of a Pakistani standard, such as by Faqeer Muhammad Faqeer (based on Gujranwali dialect) and Sardar Muhammad Khan (based on Wazirabadi dialect)

=== Eastern Punjabi ===
- Majhi: spoken in Majha region. (Note: According to Mangat Bhardwaj, Majhi is an Eastern Punjabi dialect.)
- Doabi: originated from and spoken in Doaba region in Punjab, India; also spoken in parts of urban Punjab, Pakistan, specifically Faisalabad
- Malwai: spoken in Malwa region
- Puadhi: spoken in Puadh region
- Pahari: spoken in Northern parts.
- Rai boli: spoken in Fazilka district.

=== Western Punjabi ===
- Dhanni: spoken in Chakwal, Talagang and southern parts of Attock and Jhelum districts
- Jhangochi: spoken in Bar region, from Jhang to Pakpattan
- Shahpuri: spoken in Sargodha and Khushab
- Thalochi: spoken in the Thal region.
- Pahari-Pothwari: spoken in Rawalpindi and much of Azad Jammu and Kashmir.
- Hindko
  - Southern Hindko:
    - Awankari: spoken in Talagang
    - Chachi: spoken in the Chach
    - Ghebi: spoken in Pindi Gheb
    - Kohati: spoken in Kohat
    - Peshawari: spoken in Peshawar, forms basis for literary Hindko
  - Hazara Hindko: spoken in Hazara region, also known as Northern Hindko or Hazarvi
- Saraiki
  - Derawali: spoken in Derajat region
  - Multani: spoken in the region around Multan, forms basis for literary Saraiki
  - Riasti: spoken in Rahim Yar Khan and Rajanpur districts
- Khetrani: spoken in Barkhan and Dera Ghazi Khan

=== Classification schemes ===
==== Greirson (early 20th century) ====
George Abraham Grierson of the Linguistic Survey of India authored two works examining the eastern and western dialects of Punjabi separately, in 1916 and 1919 respectively. His list of dialects includes Majhi, Doabi (incl. Ludhiani), Puadhi, Rathi, Malwai, Bhattiani, Rechna Doab dialect, Gujari, and Dogri. Grierson's classification was as follows:

- Proto-Punjabi derived languages:
  - Punjabi, including the following dialects:
    - Majhi
    - Ludhiani
    - Powadhi
    - Rathi
    - Malwai
    - Bhattiani
    - Recha Doab dialect
  - Dogri
- Lahnda

A key factor in Grierson's classification scheme was a demarcation between Western and Eastern Punjabi varieties. Grierson categorized Eastern Punjabi as part of the central group of Indo-Aryan languages while Western Punjabi was categorized as part of the northwestern or outer group of Indo-Aryan languages. Grierson used the term "Proto-Punjabi" to describe the language that Dogri and Punjabi evolved from and notes Punjabi and Lahnda as separate linguistic phenomenons. However, this paradigm is ignored by later analyses by Gill and Gleason (1962), which Kali Charan Bahl attributes the reason being that it was un-scientific, included Dogri in the Punjabi group, and that Lahnda was placed separately from Punjabi despite no proper survey being conducted on it as per Gill and Gleason. Furthermore, Grierson's analysis was admittedly based upon vocabulary rather than other factors, such as grammar. The Linguistic Survey of India's Punjabi dialectology maps and schemes were criticized by the later Linguistic Atlas of Punjab (1973).

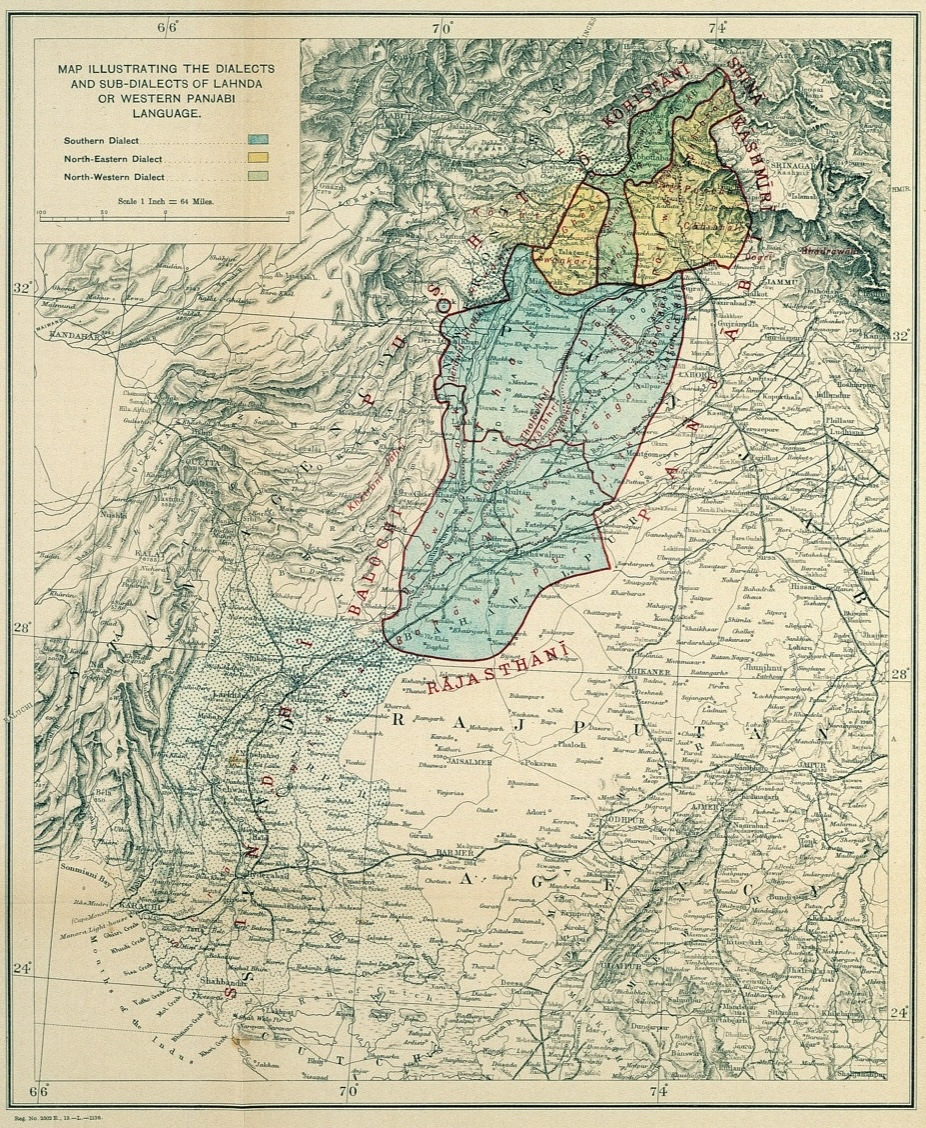
Grierson's mapping of the Western Punjabi dialects (1919)

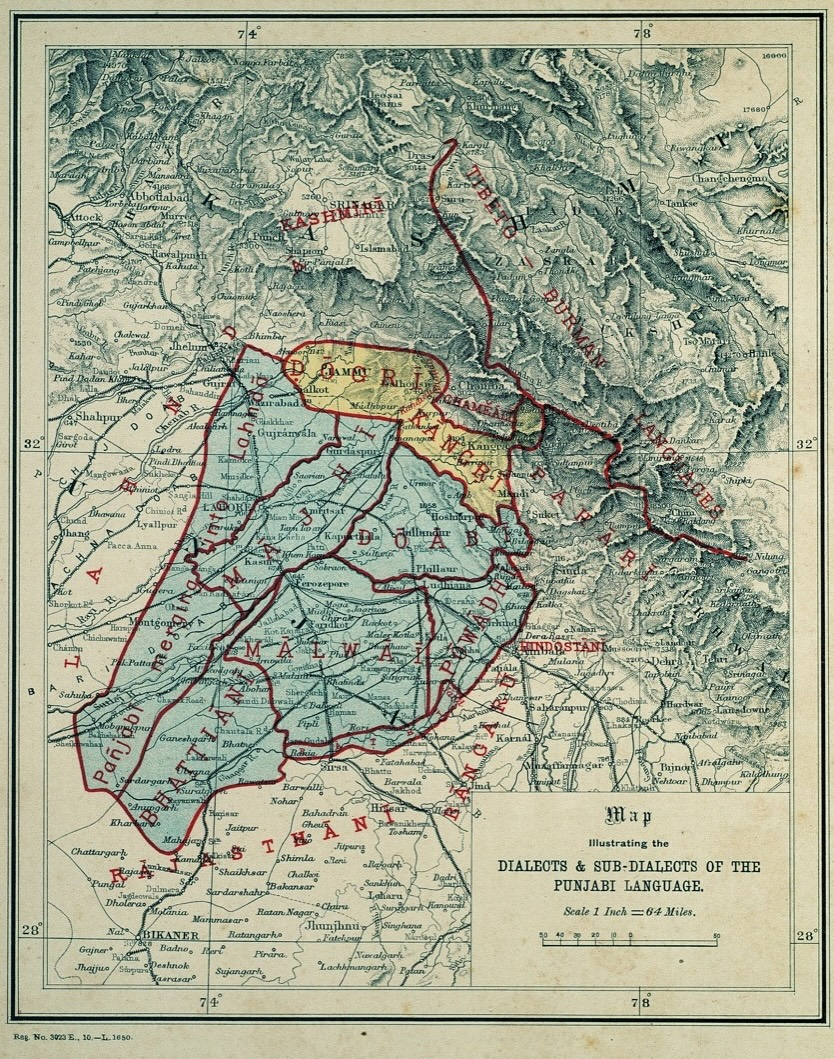
Grierson's mapping of the Eastern Punjabi dialects (1916)

==== Padam (1954) ====
Piara Singh Padam believed the Punjabi dialects consisted of the following six main dialects:

- Potohari, spoken in the hilly part of Rawalpindi, which is bounded by Suhan to the north, the Jhelum river to the east, and Jhelum district to the south, and Attock district to the west, influenced by Pashto
- Multani, spoken in Multan, Jhang, Shahpur, and Mianwali, influenced by Sindhi
- Lahori, spoken across a wide span from Gujarat to Ludhiana to Ambala, with him believing that the influence of this dialect led Majhi, Doabi, and Malwai to no longer be as distinctive from one another
- Puadhi, spoken past in an area past the Sirhand canal, including much of then Ambala district adjacent to the Ghaggar, and some part of Patiala, Ludhiana, and Hisar districts, with it being influenced by Western Hindi via Bangru
- Bhatiani, spoken in a traditional area called Bhattiana (or Bhatti Des), comprising of some parts of Ferozepur district and the adjoining part of the north Bikaner, eventually blending with the Rajasthani border dialect Bagri. He traces the language to the Bhatti Rajputs of the region, with the Muslim Bhattis of the area being known as the Rathor/Rathore. Padam considered Rathi, a lect observed by Grierson earlier, to be a sub-dialect of Bhatiani, as he believed that those Muslims who settled in the Ghaggar Valley of Hisar (known as Rath) originated from the west of that area, with the difference being that Rathi was influenced by Bangru while Bhatiani was influenced by Bagri.
- Dogri, spoken in the montane area of north-east to the north-west of Punjab and the Jammu region

==== Gill and Gleason (1962) ====
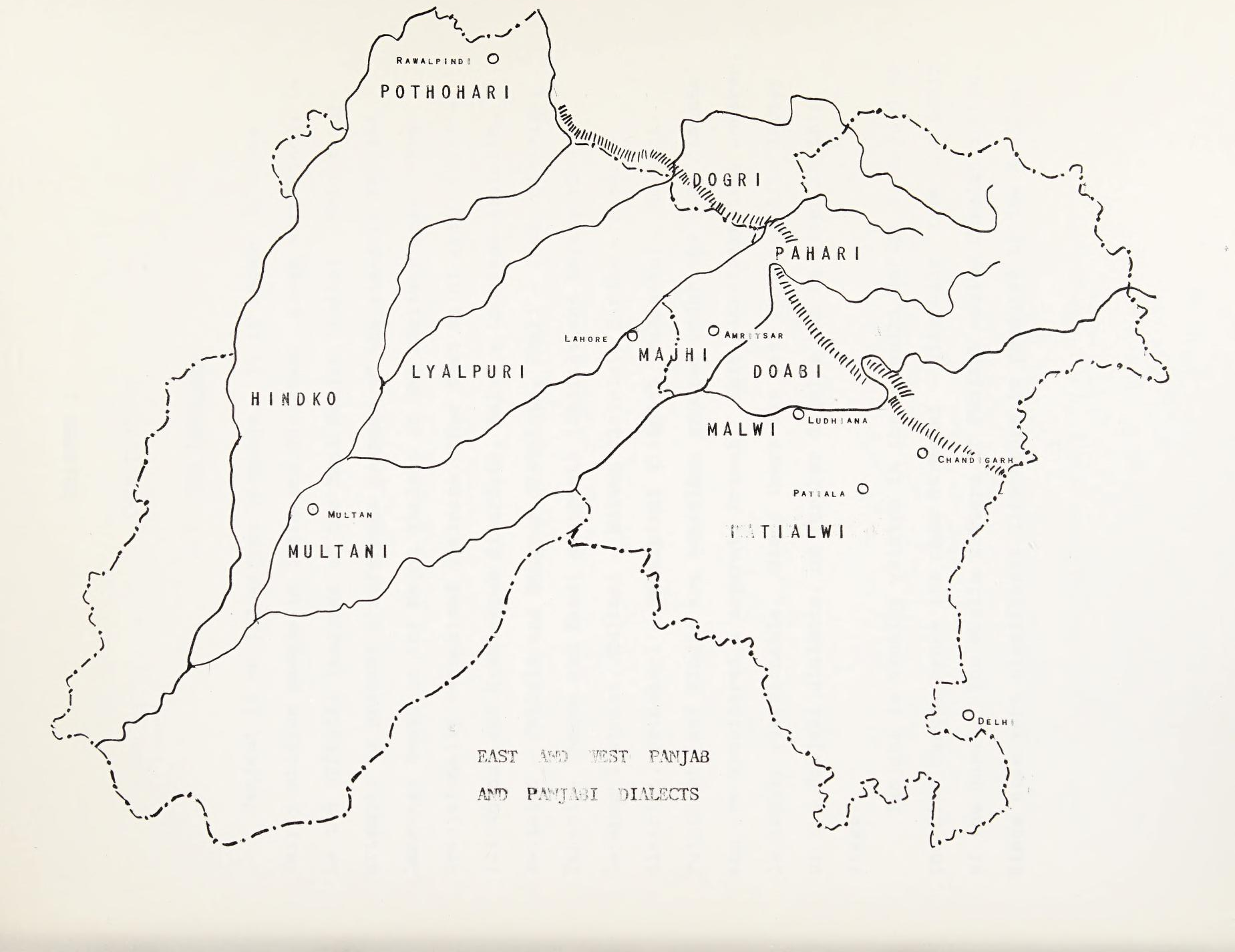
Map of the Punjabi dialects, titled 'East and West Panjab and Panjabi Dialects', published in A Reference Grammar of Punjabi (1962) by Harjeet Singh Gill and Henry Allan Gleason

The classification of Harjeet Singh Gill and Henry A. Gleason (1962) of the Punjabi dialects is as follows:

- Majhi, spoken in Amritsar district
- Doabi, spoken in the Jalandhar and Hoshiarpur districts
- Malwai, spoken in Ludhiana district
- Patialvi, spoken in Patiala and Sangrur districts
- Dogri, spoken in Jammu district
- Pahari, spoken in Chamba and Mandi districts
- Layalpuri, spoken in Layalpur district
- Lahnda varieties:
  - Multani, spoken in Multan district
  - Hindko, spoken in Hazara district
  - Pothohari, spoken Rawalpindi district

The authors in addition to the dialects noted by Grierson included the likes of Layalpuri, Patialvi, Multani, Pothohari, Hindko, and Pahari (of Chamba and Mandi). This scheme is criticized by Bahl as of "questionable linguistic relevance".

==== Sardar Muhammad Khan (1964) ====
Sardar Muhammad Khan believed in a broad classification into a western and eastern group with the Chenab River as the border between the two that included a buffer or transitional zone, with the following classification scheme:

- Western (Lahnda):
  - Multani/Siraiki
  - Pothohari
  - Hindko
- Eastern:
  - Sant Bhasha (which he called Sikhī), main dialect
  - Majhi, spoken in the Lahore and Amritsar regions
- Buffer/transitional zone (which he called Punjabi Lahnda, described as an admixture of Majhi and Lahnda), with the boundaries being Sialkot, northern Bahawalpur district, including the districts of Wazirabad, Gujranwala, Sheikhupura, Okara, and Pak Pattan

==== Bahl (1976) ====
Bahl believed that Grierson's classification scheme was "essentially correct" but disagrees with including Dogri under Punjabi and believed that Lahnda should be considered entirely separate from Punjabi.

==== Harkirat Singh (1997) ====
Harkirat Singh in the third volume of The Encyclopaedia of Sikhism (1997) classifies the Punjabi dialects into three main dialects, which are further divided into sub-dialects. His scheme was as follows:

- Eastern Punjabi
  - Majhi
  - Malwai
  - Doabi
  - Puadhi
- Western Punjabi (Lahndi)
  - Multani
  - Shahpuri-Jhangi
  - Pothohari
  - Hindko
- Pahari/Dogri
  - Kangri
  - Bhattiali
  - Jammuali
  - Poonchi

==== Bhardwaj (2016) ====
Mangat Bhardwaj classifies the Punjabi dialects into two broad groups: Eastern and Western (Lahandi) varieties, with transitional and outlying areas.

- Eastern (or Central/Kendri Panjabi):
  - Majhi
  - Doabi
  - Puwadhi
  - Malwai
- Outlying dialects of Eastern Punjabi:
  - Bhatiani
  - Rathi
  - Dogari
  - Kangri
- Western (Lahandi dialects)
- Transitional area between Eastern and Western varieties, a tract of land from Gujranwala in the north to Okara in the south

==== Dikshit and Dikshit (2025) ====
As per K. R. Dikshit and Jutta K. Dikshit (2025), the Punjabi dialects spoken in Pakistani Punjab consisted of the following:

- Standard Punjabi, spoken in Lahore, Gujranwala, Sheikhupura, Kasur, Sialkot, Narowal, Gujrat, Okara districts and neighbouring districts (north-central and north-eastern Pakistani Punjab)
- Jhangvi, spoken in Jhang district
- Potwari, spoken in the Potwar region (hinterland of Rawalpindi)
- Hindko, a cluster of dialects spoken in Attock and far-northern and north-western Pakistani Punjab, and southern Hazara Division of Khyber Pakhtunkhwa
- Shahpuri, spoken south of the Potwar region and in the Salt Range, marked by Sargodha in the south and Mianwali and Bhakkar in the west
- Jhangochi, spoken in Jhang region
- Multani, spoken in the hinterland of Multan
- Jatki, they hypothesize that it was once spoken by a large amount of the population of central Pakistani Punjab prior to the British and their agricultural reforms and projects but now relegated to agricultural labourers and downtrodden sections of society
- Saraiki, spoken around Multan with influences from Bahawalpuri and Thari

==== Linguistic institutions ====
===== Glottolog =====
Glottolog classifies the language cluster as follows (with the Punjabi varieties ["Greater Panjabic"] belonging to the "Sindhi-Lahnda" macro-grouping):

- Greater Panjabic
  - Eastern Panjabic
    - Eastern Panjabi
      - Bhattiyani
      - Doabi
      - Ludhianwi
      - Majhi (Panjabi)
      - Malwai
      - Patialwi
      - Powadhi
      - Rathi (Panjabi)
    - Sansi
      - Sochi
  - Western Panjabi
    - Dhanni
    - Jatki
    - Shahpuri
  - Paharic
    - Pahari Potwari
      - Chibhali
      - Mirpur Panjabi
      - Pahari
      - Pothwari
      - Punchic
        - Punchhi
        - Shah-Mansuri
        - Zaghloli
        - Zirak-Boli
    - Sirajic
      - Rambani
      - Siraji of Doda
  - Hindko-Siraiki
    - Hindko
      - Northern Hindko
        - Kaghani
        - Tinauli
      - Southern Hindko
        - Attock Hindko
        - Avankari Hindko
        - Ghebi
        - Kohat Hindko
        - Western Hindko
          - Peshawar Hindko
          - Rural Peshawar Hindko
    - Siraikic
      - Inku
      - Saraiki
        - Bahawalpuri
        - Central Siraiki
          - Derawali
          - Multani
        - Jhangi
        - Sindhi Siraiki
        - Thali

===== Ethnologue =====
Ethnologue classifies the Punjabi varieties as follows (with three-letter codes, with † marking extinct lects):

- Panjabi
  - Eastern Panjabi (pan)
  - Western Panjabi (Lahnda) (lah)
    - Punjabi, Western (pnb)
    - Northern Hindko (hno)
    - Southern Hindko (hnd)
    - † Inku (jat)
    - Khetrani (xhe)
    - Pahari-Potwari (phr)
    - Saraiki (skr)

===== Linguasphere =====
Linguasphere lists a variety of dialects and varieties of Punjabi (with alternative names and codes):

- Panjābi; Pendjabi; Penjabi; Punjabi (59-AAF-e Panjābi)
  - Formal Panjābi; Panjābi-F.; Formal Panjabi; Standard Panjabi (59-AAF-ea Panjābi-F.)
    - Muslim-Panjābi; Panjābi-Musalmani (59-AAF-eaa Muslim-Panjābi)
    - Sikh-Panjābi (59-AAF-eab Sikh-Panjābi)
    - Hindu-Panjābi (59-AAF-eac Hindu-Panjābi)
  - Colloquial General Panjabi; Panjābi-G.; Current Generalised Panjabi; Generalised Panjābi (59-AAF-eb Panjābi-G.)
    - Panjābi-Pakistan (59-AAF-eba Panjābi-Pakistan)
    - Panjābi-India (59-AAF-ebb Panjābi-India)
    - Panjābi-Fiji (59-AAF-ebc Panjābi-Fiji)
    - Panjābi-England (59-AAF-ebd Panjābi-England)
  - Majhi; Panjabi-East; Traditional Panjabi-Central (59-AAF-ec Majhi)
    - Lāhore (59-AAF-eca Lāhore)
    - Amritsar (59-AAF-ecb Amritsar)
    - Gurdāspur (59-AAF-ecc Gurdāspur)
  - Lahndā; Lahanda; Lahndi; West Panjabi; Traditional West Panjabi (59-AAF-ed Lahndā)
    - Potohāri; Potohri; Potwar; Rawalpindi (59-AAF-eda Potohāri)
    - Bālmiki; Attock Sweepers; Valmiki (59-AAF-edb Bālmiki)
    - Jhelum (59-AAF-edc Jhelum)
    - Sargodhā (59-AAF-edd Sargodhā)
    - Gujrāt (59-AAF-ede Gujrāt)
    - Gujrānwālā (59-AAF-edf Gujrānwālā)
    - Siālkot (59-AAF-edg Siālkot)
    - Shekhupurā (59-AAF-edh Shekhupurā)
    - Lāyalpuri (59-AAF-edi Lāyalpuri)
    - Chinawari (59-AAF-edj Chinawari)
    - Niswāni (59-AAF-edk Niswāni)
    - Bardi-Boli (59-AAF-edl Bardi-Boli)
    - Jatatardi-Boli (59-AAF-edm Jatatardi-Boli)
  - Doābi; Doab (59-AAF-ee Doābi)
    - Hoshiārpur (59-AAF-eea Hoshiārpur)
    - Jullundur (59-AAF-eeb Jullundur)
  - Malwāi; Jangali; Malwa (59-AAF-ef Malwāi)
  - Patiālwi (59-AAF-eg Patiālwi)
    - Patiālā (59-AAF-ega Patiālā)
    - Sangrur (59-AAF-egb Sangrur)
  - Awankāri-Ghebi (59-AAF-eh Awankāri-Ghebi)
    - Salt-Range (59-AAF-eha Salt-Range)
    - Awankāri (59-AAF-ehb Awankāri)
    - Ghebi (59-AAF-ehc Ghebi)
  - Gaddi; Gaddi-Chamba; Gadi; Gadyali (59-AAF-ei Gaddi)
    - Churāhi; Churahi Gadi; Curahi (59-AAF-eia Churāhi)
    - Bharmauri; Bharmaudi Bhadi; Bharmauri Pahari; Panchi Brahmauri Rajput (59-AAF-eib Bharmauri)
  - Bhateāli; Bhateali Gadi; Bhattiani; Bhatyiana (59-AAF-ej Bhateāli)
  - Dogri; Dhogaryali; Dogari; Dogri Jammu; Dongari; Hindi-Dogri; Tokkaru (59-AAF-ek Dogri)
    - Bhatbali (59-AAF-eka Bhatbali)
    - Dogri-North (59-AAF-ekb Dogri-N.)
    - Dogri-East (59-AAF-ekc Dogri-E.)
    - Kandiāli (59-AAF-ekd Kandiāli)
  - Kāngri (59-AAF-el Kāngri)
  - Mirpuri; Mirpur Panjabi (59-AAF-em Mirpuri)
  - Hindko-North; Hindki; Hindki-North (59-AAF-en Hindki)
    - Hazārā-Hindko (59-AAF-ena Hazārā-Hindko)
    - Kohāti (59-AAF-enb Kohāti)
    - Tinauli (59-AAF-enc Tinauli)
  - Hindko-South; Hindko; Peshawar; Peshawari Hindko (59-AAF-eo Hindko)
  - Kahlūri; Bilaspuri; Bilaspuri Pahari; Kehloori; Kehloori Paheri; Pacchmi (59-AAF-ep Kahlūri)
  - Sirāiki; Multani; Panjabi-Southwest (59-AAF-eq Sirāiki)
    - Derāwāli; Hindki-South (59-AAF-eqa Derāwāli)
    - Multāni; Multan (59-AAF-eqb Multāni)
    - Bahawalpuri; Reasiti; Riasiti (59-AAF-eqc Bahawalpuri)
    - Khetrāni (59-AAF-eqd Khetrāni)
    - Jangli (59-AAF-eqe Jangli)
    - Jafiri (59-AAF-eqf Jafiri)
    - Thāli-North; Thāli-N.; Jatki-West; Sindh-Sagar-Doab (59-AAF-eqg Thāli-N.)
    - Sirāiki-Sindhi; Sindh-Hindki; Panjabi + Sindhi Transitional (59-AAF-eqh Sirāiki-Sindhi)

== Dialectology ==
The Linguistic Survey of India (completed in 1927) overseen by George A. Grierson conducted research onto Punjabi and Lahnda, however its linguistic veracity is questionable as per S. N. Gajendragadkar due to its data collection and processing being by the colonial establishment (including by un-trained patwaris) rather than linguists. Furthermore, it became outdated as newer dialects were discussed in academia. However, despite this it was a foundational work in the field of Punjabi linguistics. Most academic research on Punjabi dialects focus on the Eastern varieties, with there being less research being done on western varieties. Scientific study of dialectal phonology has mostly been conducted on eastern Punjabi varieties, such as by scholars Jain (1934), Arun (1961), Gill and Gleason (1962), Singh (1971), Dulai and Koul (1980), Bhatia (1993), Malik (1995), Shackle (2003), and Dhillon (2010). A few scholars who have researched the phonology of western Punjabi varieties include the likes of Bahri (1962) and Baart (2003, 2014). Linguists and other writers who studied Saraiki specifically include Burton (1849), O' Brien (1881), Bomford (1895), Jukes (1900), Wilson (1899), Grierson (1919), Smirnov (1975), and Shackle (1972, 1976, 2007), Mehr (1967), Fikri (1971), Zimi (1963, 1970), Wagha (1990, 1998), and Mughal (1990, 1996, 2000, 2003).

The creation of a dictionary for Lahndi and Malwai dialects was proposed in 1958. Ved Kumari Ghai researched tonality in Dogri (1968). In regards to dialectal linguistics, a reference grammar by Balbir Singh Sandhu on the Puadhi dialect was published in 1969, with another work by him on the same dialect's vowel, consonents, and suprasegmental phenomenon in 1974. S. S. Joshi did a dissertation on Doabi dialect's pitch, sentence and word intonation, and other aspects (using acoustic phonetics) that was published in 1972.

A major work that documented the dialects of Punjabi in a comprehensive manner was The Linguistic Atlas of Punjab (1972), the largest such study on Punjabi since the earlier Linguistic Survey of India. The accuracy of the atlas' dialectology, which challenged traditional dialect classifications, was praised by scholars like Christopher Shackle and R. K. Sprigg. Within the Linguistic Atlast of Punjab, the text of the folktale of Puran Bhagat is compared across locations, consisting of the vernacular spoken in Rawalpindi, Dhudial, Talagang, Mianwali, Sargodha, Jhang, Shujabad, Upper Mahasu, Lower Mahasu, Kangra, Kulu, Mandi, Chamba, Punch, Akhnur, Udhampur, Jammu-Tawi, Basoli, Samba, Kathua, Tarn Taran, Phagwara, Patiala, Barnala, and Rohtak.

E. B. A. Awan did his PhD dissertation in 1974 on the phonology and verbal phrases of Hindko dialect. Mukhtiar Singh Gill in 1975 conducted research on phonology and word formation regarding the dialect spoken in Barnala tehsil. In 1975, Atam Singh did phonological research on the Kharar vernacular. Manjit Singh Chahal conducted work on the lexis, tones, and inflexions of the Bawri dialect spoken by the Bouria tribe. In 1978, Joshi wrote a work on Doabi dialect's phonology and verbal phrases using a polysystemic method, published as a book in 1989. In 1982, Madhu Bala conducted phonological research on Kangri. In 1986, Punjabi University published a work on Puadhi dialect's consonants via instrumental analysis. Daljeet Kaur Dhandli and Neeta Sood conducted phonological research on Puadhi and Bahawalpuri (as spoken in Patiala), respectively. Sudhinder Kaur studied Patialvi. Research on the Lyallpuri Punjabi of Faisalabad has been carried out by Hussain (2015, 2017, 2019). Bashir & Conners (2019) is a grammatical description comparing Punjabi with Saraiki and Hindko.

== History ==
=== Origin ===
According to Jagtar Singh Grewal, the Punjabi dialects started emerging between the fall of the empire of Harsha in the 7th century and the rise of the Delhi Sultanate in the 13th century. Padam (1954) believed that eastern Punjabi emerged from Shauraseni while Lahnda emerged from Paishachi. According to Mangat Bhardwaj, it is possible that the Western and Eastern Punjabi zones may have originally spoken different Apabhraṁśas, with the Lahnda zone being primarily Paiśāchī Apabhraṁśa while the Eastern Punjabi area consisted of a transitional zone of Śaurasenī merging into Paiśāchī, with Śaurasenī being spoken in the neighbouring Western Hindi zone. As per Suniti Kumar Chatterji (1926), the protoform of Sindhi, Lahndi, and Punjabi was Udicya (north-western dialects) while Punjabi also bore influence from Sourseni. According to Prabodh Pandit, the Indo-Aryan languages was initially split into three groups, with Punjabi, Lahndi, Sindhi, Kachchi, Kashmiri, and Pahari forming out of the north (north-western) group. As per this formulization, eastern Punjabi (originally very similar to Lahndi) was later influenced by the central zone, first by Śaurasenī and later by Braj, leading it to deviate from Lahndi. Glottolog identifies Paiśāchī as the ancestral language that the Punjabi dialects derived from. According to Padam, the Punjab dialects arose due to limited means of transportion and communication between peoples in pre-modern times, and also due to geographical boundaries caused by natural features like mountains and rivers, thus insular communities evolved their own variety overtime, causing further dialectal diversity. Dialectal variation also takes caste, profession, and creed into account. Amir Khusrau referred to the language spoken in the Lahore region as Lahauri, which later became known as Punjabi. Farid composed works in his Multani dialect. Guru Nanak's native lect was Shekhupuri. There was a long period of literary interaction between Western (Lahnda) and Eastern Punjabi in the subsequent period, showcased in the works of Muslim Sufis and Sikhs.

=== Mediaeval period ===
In pre-colonial Punjab, there was no standardised form of the Punjabi language (with it being primarily oral and lacking a formal grammar and lexicon) but rather several dialects and variants were utilised and built upon a linguistically heterogenous literary tradition. The scenario is described as a diglossia, where peoples' language varied depending on setting, such as if at home or in the bazaar, and medium, whether written or spoken. There was a difference between classical and vernacular registers. The inhabitants likely had degrees of intelligibility with neighbouring languages due to shared linguistic features and roots. The region was historically influenced by a variety of Punjabi dialects and other languages, such as Persian, Arabic, Sanskrit, Kashmiri, Balochi, Pashto, Khariboli, and Braj. A Sanskritic background became influence by Perso-Islamicate culture. A variety of scripts were in use for a variety of purposes, such as Perso-Arabic, Gurmukhi, and Landa, with spellings varying for words based upon individual preference or region. Persian was historically the administrative language of the Mughals and their successor states, including the Sikhs. In the 18th century, a special type of vernacular called Khalsa Bole developed amongst the Sikhs.

=== Colonial period ===
The British East India Company replaced Persian for administration with English and local Indian vernaculars in 1837. Punjab was annexed by the British in 1849. Due to the lack of a standardised register of Punjabi, a colonial-era belief that Punjabi was spoken by illiterates (due to its literary tradition being primarily oral and folklore-based rather than a written tradition), and its seemingly similar grammatical structure and vocabulary with Urdu, Urdu was selected as the administrative language of British Punjab rather than Punjabi. Punjabi was regarded by the early colonial administration as a dialect of Urdu. Christian missionary institutions, such as the Serampore Mission Press and especially the Ludhiana Mission Press, played a role in the standardisation of Punjabi sets. The press worked mostly in the eastern Punjabi dialect spoken in the Ludhiana region, which was regarded as 'European Standard Punjabi'. Grierson (1916) regarded the Majhi of Lahore and Amritsar as "pure" or "standard" Punjabi. Another influential dialect was Siraiki, spoken in the southwest and Multan area. The District Gazatteers produced by the colonial administration documented the local dialects of various Punjabi districts. Despite early attempts by the Christian missionaries, dialectal and regional variation of Punjabi remained prevalent and a standardised form was not fully realised. A standard Punjabi took on a more complete formulation under the Sikh reformers.

During the British colonial period, certain districts were made up of speakers of various dialects of Punjabi. Most areas under the control of the princely states of colonial Punjab were located in Malwai-speaking areas (other areas were in Haryanvi-speaking areas, not classified as a Punjabi dialect while Kapurthala had an estate in Awadh, a Hindustani area). However, certain areas of British Punjab contained speakers of other language groups, such as Haryanvi in parts of Ambala division and Pahari (such as Kangri) in Kangra district and other parts of Jalandhar division. The Punjab canal colonies project in the late 19th century brought many Eastern Punjabi speaking settlers into Western Punjabi speaking areas, with the reverse occurring in 1947. After the partition of 1947, refugees speaking various dialects resettled in different dialect areas, leading to influence on the local dialects and the transplantation of dialects. Eastern Punjabis settled in Gujranwala, Faisalabad, Lahore, and Sahiwal in Western Punjab after partition. Eastern Punjab came to be known as Charhda Punjab while Western Punjab became known as Lehnda Punjab. Furthermore, a term for united Punjab was coined, being Sanjha Punjab.

=== Modern period ===
==== India ====
Dialectal Punjabi is now in decline, being surmounted by Standard Punjabi, known as Taksali Punjabi, Kendri Punjabi , or Markazi Punjabi. In India, Modern Standard Punjabi is both spoken and written in Gurmukhi and is primarily based upon the Majhi dialect of Lahore, Amritsar, and Gurdaspur districts but also bears influence from other dialects. However, as per Bahl, it is a misconception that Modern Standard Punjabi is based primarily upon the Majhi dialect of Lahore, Amritsar, and Gurdaspur districts. According to Shackle, Modern Standard Punjabi's formation and evolution is closely tied with socio-religious movements associated with the Sikhs. Modern Standard Punjabi of the Sikhs was originally based on Majhi and Lahnda but after the partition of Punjab, it was later influenced by Malwai and Doabi, also being increasingly Sanskritized and de-Persianized. Eastern Punjabi is also being further influenced by Hindi.

==== Pakistan ====
In Pakistan, there have been proposals for a Pakistani Standard Punjabi. In December 1951, Faqeer Muhammad Faqeer advocated for the Pakistani standard to be based upon the dialect of the Gujranwala region due to its central location and literary history. Later, Sardar Muhammad Khan made the case for the usage of the Lahndi variety spoken in Warzirabad as the basis for a Pakistani Standard Punjabi. He also advocated for the usage of Perso-Arabic script. Waqar Ambalvi supported an Urduized form of Punjabi, which he termed Pāk Panjābī ("Pure/Pakistani Punjabi"), which incorporated Urduisms, considering it "beautiful" and "flavourful", however purists like Sardar Khan disapproved of this approach. As per K. R. Dikshit and Jutta K. Dikshit (2025), the standard Punjabi used in Pakistan is based upon the dialect of the districts of Lahore, Gujranwala, Sheikhupura, Kasur, Sialkot, Narowal, Gujrat, Okara and neighbouring districts. In Pakistan, a Saraiki identity has arisen which advocates for a separate linguistic identity. The Saraiki movement arose in the 1960s and has adopted historical figures like Shaikh Farid Shakarganj and Khwaja Ghulam Farid as literary antecedents.

== Characteristics ==
The varieties of "Greater Punjabi" have a number of characteristics in common, for example the preservation of the Prakrit double consonants in stressed syllables. Other features of Punjabi dialects include an SOV word order, postpositions, gender and case systems, being concatenative language with agreement, and gender for nouns (animate or inanimate), verbs, postpositions, and most notably, phonemic tones. A feature that Punjabi has that somewhat differs it from other standard languages of India is tone as per Gleason and Gill. However, J. D. Singh notes that neighbouring vernaculars like Kangri, Bangru (Haryanvi), and Rajasthani also exhibit tonality. Tones developed in Punjabi via tonogenesis. However, there is a diversity within the Punjabi dialects regarding tonal features, such as:

- Loss of voiced aspirated stops (/bʰ d̪ʰ ɖʰ gʰ/) in eastern Punjab varieties
- Arising of contrastive tones in eastern Punjabi lects
- Loss of lost voiced aspirates and developed tones, seen in the western Punjabi dialects spoken in Lahore, Faisalabad, and Sargodha areas and neighboring regions
- Preservation of reserved voiced aspirates and contrast tones, such as in the case of the Awankari variety of Lahndi and the vernacular spoken in Jhelum and nearby
- Undergoing transition of a loss of aspiration contrast but without gaining contrastive tone, such as seen in the Jangli lect, especially the variety spoken in rural Faisalabad

Lahnda and to a lesser extent Eastern Punjabi both preserve Sanskrit case markers on nouns and pronouns, some Sanskrit markers on verb (including TMA, Tense Mood Aspect) and passive voice. A key difference between Western Punjabi (Lahnda) and Eastern Punjabi is that the former preserves breathy voiced consonants, which are no longer present in Eastern Punjabi. Hindko and Pothwari are mutually intelligible with Punjabi. Saraki is mutually intelligible with Punjabi. However, Saraiki has distinguishing features from Punjabi varieties, such as four distinctive implosive consonants (/b/, /d/, /g/, and /j/), that are pronounced with indrawn breath and contrast phonemically with the usual /b/, /d/, /g/, and /j/ of Punjabi. Furthermore, Saraiki has the typical Indo-Aryan aspirates, which are uniquely realized as tones in Punjabi. Saraiki also has five-way laryngeal contrast (/p pʰ b bʱ ɓ/) to differentiate it. Punjabi dialects have historically been influenced by other languages, such as Arabic, Persian, English, and Hindi-Urdu. In modern-times, Eastern Punjabi varieties are influenced by Sanskritisation (through Hindi) while Western Punjabi varieties are influenced by Urduisation. Some dialects have been considered transitional between other language groups, such as. Puadhi between Punjabi and Bangru (Haryanvi), in the south between Lahndi and Sindhi, and Bhattiani from Punjabi and Bagri (Rajasthani).

== Geographic distribution ==
The Punjabi dialects do not have well-defined boundaries and generally merge into one another in a surreptitious fashion. As per a popular Punjabi idiom, the local language changes every twelve kohs.: As per Qandeel Hussain on Punjabi dialects, "There are no well-defined boundaries of modern Punjabi dialects. Each city has a slightly distinct dialect which merges with the neighboring cities". Christopher Shackle stated the following regarding the dialect continuum situation in Punjab:

In most other parts of the Indo-Aryan area, the continuum of related dialects has been overlaid in the modern period by carefully defined standard languages, but this process has not taken place in Punjab, where the British policy of using Urdu instead of any form of local speech as the official language has been continued in Pakistan.

— Christopher Shackle (5 October 2015), Siraiki language, Encyclopedia Britannica

Generally, eastern Punjabi dialects are primarily spoken in Indian Punjab while western Punjabi dialects are found in Pakistani Punjab. However, some dialects have been transplanted from their autochthonous area due to refugee movement during the 1947 partition. In India, Punjabi is spoken in Punjab State and parts of Haryana, Himachal Pradesh, Jammu and Kashmir and Rajasthan (specifically Ganganagar tehsil). In Pakistan, it is spoken in Punjab Province and parts of the North-Western Frontier Province (now KPK), Sindh, and some territories of Jammu and Poonch. Inku, classified as part of the Punjabi macro-family by Ethnologue, was historically spoken in Afghanistan.

The literary standards that have developed on the basis of dialects are: Majhi-based Standard Punjabi in eastern and central Punjab, Saraiki in the southwest, and Pahari-Pothwari and Hindko in the northwest. A distinction is usually made between Eastern Punjabi in the east and Lahnda (Western Punjabi) in the west. Lahnda typically subsumes the Saraiki and Hindko varieties, with Jhangvi, Shahpuri, and Dhanni being intermediate between other Lahnda varieties and Eastern Punjabi. Pahari-Pothwari shares features with both Lahnda and Central/Eastern Punjabi. Khalsa Bole is a unique composite vernacular spoken by some Sikh groups that draws upon "a mixture of Punjabi, Old Hindi, Persian and other dialects used in various regions of India" for its vocabulary.

=== Pakistan ===
Punjabi, Hindko and Saraiki are listed separately in the census enumerations of Pakistan. According to the 2017 Census of Pakistan, there are 80,536,390 Punjabi speakers; 25,324,637 Saraiki speakers and 5,065,879 Hindko speakers. Saraiki was added to the census in 1981, and Hindko was added in 2017, prior to which both were represented by "Punjabi" in general. In areas such as Gujar Khan and Rawalpindi where Pothwari is the spoken variety, speakers significantly selected "Punjabi" instead of "Other" in all previous census enumeration. Saraiki is spoken in southern Punjab, Pakistan with some speakers in India.

==== Azad Jammu and Kashmir ====
In a statistical survey carried about by a proxy of the Government of Azad Kashmir, most speakers of Azad Kashmir spoke a variety of Pahari-Pothwari, while Majhi (represented simply as "Punjabi") attained a plurality in the Bhimber district. Some Pahari-Pothwari speakers in Azad Kashmir, like the ones in Pothohar, simply refer to their mother tongue as "Punjabi".

=== India ===
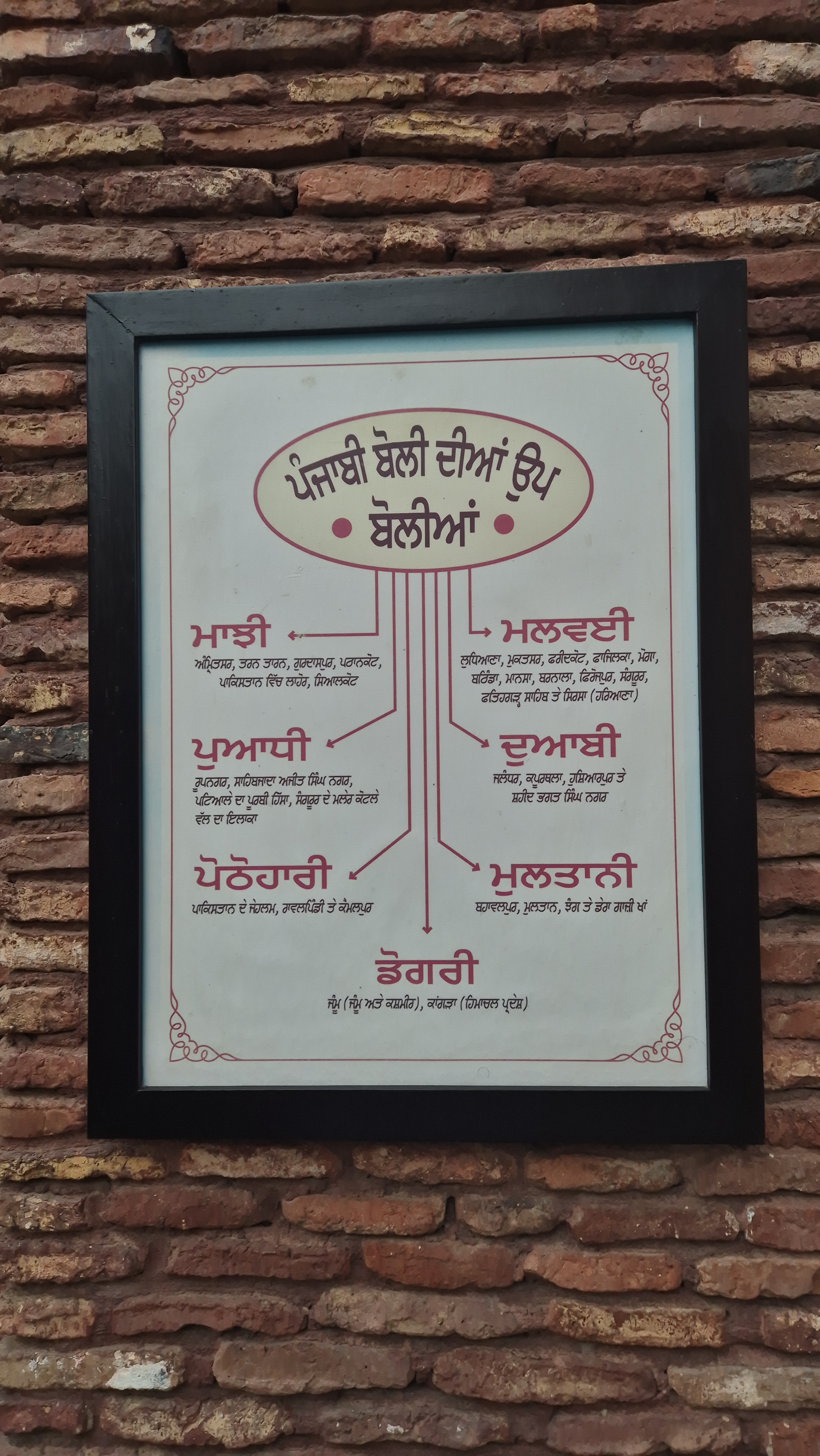
Poster claiming to depict dialects of Punjabi, displayed at Sadda Pind, Amritsar, Punjab, India

In India, Punjabi is listed as a constitutional language and is counted in the census returns. According to the 2011 Census of India, there are 33,124,726 Punjabi speakers which includes the varieties of Bagri (1,656,588 speakers) Bilaspuri (295,805 speakers) and Bhateali (23,970 speakers). Bagri is spoken in parts of Punjab, Haryana and Rajasthan. Doabi spoken in lower parts of Una district in Himachal Pradesh. The status of Bagri is split between Punjabi and Rajasthani in the census returns with options available under Punjabi and Rajasthani. Gusain (1991) places Bagri as a Rajasthani dialect. Similarly, the identities of Bilaspuri and Bhateali are also split, in their case, between Punjabi and Dogri.

Lahnda (Western Punjabi) varieties are enumerated separately in the census returns in India with 108,791 speakers listed in the 2011 census. The varieties listed under Lahnda are 'Bahawalpuri' (29,253 speakers); 'Multani' which is described as 'Hindi Multani' (61,722 speakers) and unclassified (17,816 speakers). 'Poonchi' is spoken in Jammu; and is listed under Lahnda as it, together with 'Bahwalpuri' and 'Multani' satisfies the "criterion of 10,000 or more speakers at the all India level".

Historically, Dogri was considered to be a dialect of Punjabi spoken primarily in Jammu. In the 1941 Census, Dogri was listed under Punjabi. Since 2003, Dogri is listed as an independent language in the constitution of India. According to the 2011 Census - India, there are 2,596,767 Dogri speakers. Similar to Dogri, the Kangri language spoken in Himachal Pradesh was regarded as a Punjabi dialect but since 1971, it has been reclassified under Hindi. There were 1,117,342 Kangri speakers listed in the 2011 Census- India. Despite the independent status of Dogri and reclassification of Kangri, both languages are claimed to fall within Punjabi by some writers. Others place Dogri and Kangri within the Western Pahari group. Eberle et al. (2020) believe Dogri and Kangri are related to Eastern Punjabi and place these languages in a group of related languages descended from an intermediate division of Indo-Aryan languages.

== Extinct lects ==
Extinct dialects include Lubanki, formerly spoken by the Labana, and Inku, formerly spoken by a peripatetic groups of Afghanistan.

== See also ==
- Punjabi grammar
- Punjabi dictionary
- Bengali dialects
- Sindhi languages
- Hindi Belt
- Bazigar language
- Baahar di boli, term used to refer to diasporic Punjabis use of the language
- Khalsa bole, coded language of Nihang Sikhs largely based on Punjabi

== Sources ==
- Birmani, Ali H.; Ahmed, Fasih (2017). "Language of the Khetrans of Barkhan of Pakistani Balochistan: A preliminary description". Lingua. 191–192: 3–21. doi:10.1016/j.lingua.2016.12.003. ISSN 0024-3841.
- Burling, Robbins. 1970. Man's many voices. New York: Holt, Rinehart and Winston.
- Ethnologue. Indo-Aryan Classification of 219 languages that have been assigned to the Indo-Aryan grouping of the Indo-Iranian branch of the Indo-European languages.
- Ethnologue. Languages of India
- Ethnologue. Languages of Pakistan
- Grierson, George A. (1903–1928). Linguistic Survey of India. Calcutta: Office of the Superintendent of Government Printing, India. Online database
- Masica, Colin P. (1991). The Indo-Aryan languages. Cambridge language surveys. Cambridge University Press. ISBN 978-0-521-23420-7.
- Rahman, Tariq (1996). Language and politics in Pakistan. Oxford University Press. ISBN 978-0-19-577692-8.
- Rahman, Tariq. 2006. The role of English in Pakistan with special reference to tolerance and militancy. In Amy Tsui et al., Language, policy, culture and identity in Asian contexts. Routledge. 219–240.
- Rensch, Calvin R. (1992). "The Language Environment of Hindko-Speaking People". In O'Leary, Clare F.; Rensch, Calvin R.; Hallberg, Calinda E. (eds.). Hindko and Gujari. Sociolinguistic Survey of Northern Pakistan. Islamabad: National Institute of Pakistan Studies, Quaid-i-Azam University and Summer Institute of Linguistics. ISBN 969-8023-13-5.
- Shackle, C. 1970. Punjabi in Lahore. Modern Asian Studies, 4 (3):239–267. Available online at JSTOR.
- Shackle, Christopher (1979). "Problems of classification in Pakistan Panjab". Transactions of the Philological Society. 77 (1): 191–210. doi:10.1111/j.1467-968X.1979.tb00857.x. ISSN 0079-1636.
- Shackle, Christopher (2003). "Panjabi". In Cardona, George; Jain, Dhanesh (eds.). The Indo-Aryan languages. Routledge language family series. Y. London: Routledge. pp. 581–621. ISBN 978-0-7007-1130-7.
- Wagha, Muhammad Ahsan (1997). The development of Siraiki language in Pakistan (Ph.D.). School of Oriental and African Studies. (requires registration)
