= Punjabi Sikhs =

Ethnic group of the Indian subcontinent

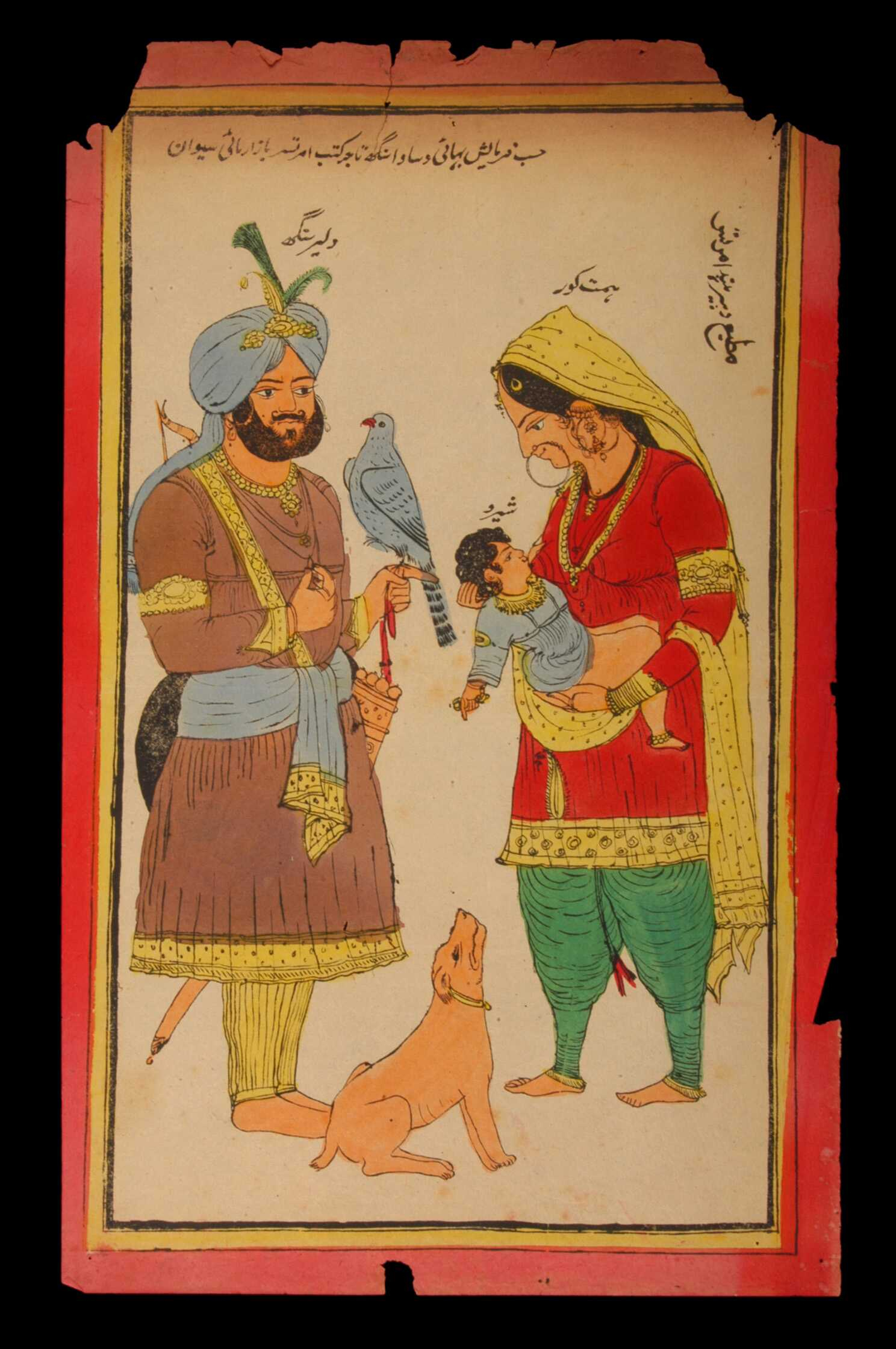
- A painting of a Punjabi Sikh family, circa late 19th century

Total population
- c. 25-28 million approx. (Worldwide)

Regions with significant populations
- Punjab, India: 16,004,754 (2011 census) (Note: Figure is total Sikh population on census.)
- Haryana: 1,243,752 (2011)
- Rajasthan: 872,930 (2011)
- Uttar Pradesh: 643,500 (2011)
- Delhi: 570,581 (2011)
- Uttarakhand: 236,340 (2011)
- Maharashtra: 223,247 (2011)
- Madhya Pradesh: 151,412 (2011)
- Chandigarh: 138,329 (2011)
- Himachal Pradesh: 79,896 (2011)

Religions
- Sikhism

Languages
- Sacred language Sant Bhasha Ethnic language Punjabi and its dialects Code language Khalsa bole Other languages Hindi, English

Punjabi Sikhs are an ethnoreligious group of Punjabis who adhere to Sikhism. The global Sikh population is primarily composed of Punjabis. Punjabi Sikhs primarily inhabit and form the largest religious community in the Indian state of Punjab, the only Sikh-majority administrative division in the world. Punjabi Sikhs make up 57.69% of the state’s population. Apart from Indian Punjab, Punjabi Sikhs are found in large numbers across the Indian states of Haryana, Himachal Pradesh, Uttarakhand, Delhi, Chandigarh, Rajasthan, Madhya Pradesh, Uttar Pradesh and Maharashtra. Large numbers are also found in the United States, Canada, Australia, New Zealand, Britain, and Malaysia due to various immigration waves over the centuries.

The majority of Sikhs are of an ethnic Punjabi-background and Sikhism today is a non-proselytizing religion. Throughout Sikhism's history, it remained mostly a Punjabi-affair, despite some inclinations of Sindhis and other South Asian ethnic groups becoming associated with the religion on the boundaries, such as in the form of the Nanakpanthi tradition. Sikhism became a "global" religion in the migration-period, but this is due to emigration from the Punjab and intermarying with non-Punjabis. Thus, non-Punjabi conversion to Sikhism has been limited mostly to solitary conversions.

== History ==
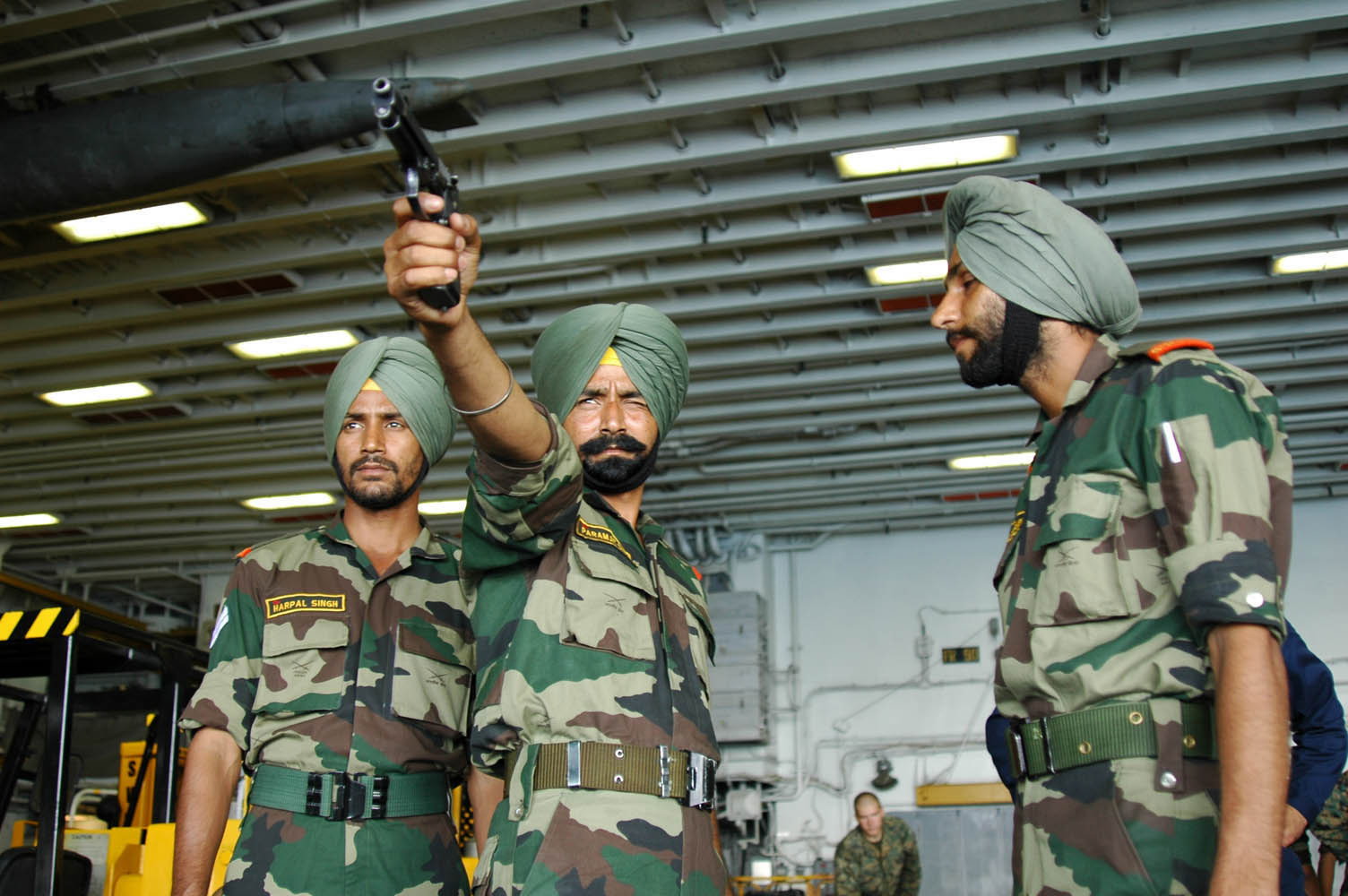
Indian Punjabi Sikh soldiers during their military training

The Sikh religion founder, Guru Nanak (1469–1539), was roughly a contemporary of the founder of Mughal Empire Babur in India. Guru Nanak was born in a Punjabi Hindu Khatri family, which was initially a community of scribes and traders. In the Punjab region, the eldest son of every Punjabi Hindu families was nominated and was represented a sardar who protected his family and Indic communities from the tyrannies of Mughal rulers and their torture. A large number of peasants from Hindu and Muslim backgrounds in Punjab have converted to Sikhism for various motives (such as conviction, fear, or economic) since the starting of new faith. The militarization of Punjabi Sikhs began after the execution of Guru Arjan (5th guru in Sikhism). Following his execution, a conflict erupted between the Mughal Empire and Sikhs which led to the last guru, Gobind Singh, establishing a militarized order known as the Khalsa, in 1699.

Due to persecution in the Mughal Empire under Aurangzeb in the 17th century, the Khalsa was formed. The region of Punjab was invaded by Nader Shah and Ahmad Shah Abdali in the 18th-century. A Sikh kingdom formed in the Punjab under Maharaja Ranjit Singh in 1799.

After Ranjit Singh's death, the kingdom was annexed by the British Empire in India. Punjabi Sikh soldiers constituted a significant chunk of the British Indian Army due to their distinguished service in action.

After the Second World War, India gained its independence in 1947. The independence was marked by the partition of India, which led many Sikhs in what would become Pakistan migrating eastward, leaving their properties behind.

In the 1980s, an insurgency over the Khalistan issue arose in the Punjab. The demand for Khalistan as a separate homeland for Sikhs is championed by a segment of the Punjabi Sikh population, various advocacy groups, and certain Non-Resident Indians (NRIs) who demand secession of Indian Punjab from India. This movement, rooted in historical, political, and religious factors, emerged prominently in the 1970s and 1980s. Key advocates include local organizations in Punjab and Sikhs abroad, particularly in Canada, the UK, and the US. They seek to safeguard Sikh identity, achieve political autonomy, and address historical grievances such as Operation Blue Star and the 1984 anti-Sikh riots. However, not all Sikhs support this idea, with many preferring integration within India to address issues through democratic means. While the Khalistan movement does not dominate mainstream Sikh politics today, it remains a contentious issue with varying levels of support.

Despite being only around 2% of India's population, Punjabi Sikhs constitute around 20% of the Indian Armed Forces, with the Punjab state being the 2nd largest contributor for manpower after Uttar Pradesh.

== Language ==
Punjabi Sikhs speak the Punjabi language as their mother tongue. Various dialects of the Punjabi language such as Bagri, Bilaspuri, Bhateali, Majhi, Doabi, Malwai, and Puadhi are spoken by Punjabi Sikhs across India and abroad as their mother tongue. In Indian Punjab, Punjabi is written in the Indic Gurmukhi script (the Perso-Arabic Shahmukhi script is used in Pakistani Punjab). The use of Gurmukhi script generally started and developed during the time of second Sikh guru, Guru Angad Dev (1504–1552) who standardized it. It is commonly regarded as a Sikh script.

== Culture ==
=== Festivals ===
Punjabi Sikhs observe historic festivals such as Lohri, Basant and Vaisakhi as seasonal and cultural festivals in Punjab and outside of it. Other seasonal Punjabi festivals in India include Maghi and Teeyan respectively. Teeyan is also known as festival of females, as women enjoy it with their close friends. On the day of maghi, people fly kites and eat the traditional dish khichdi. Other festivals observed by Punjabi Sikhs includes the festivals of Sikhism like- Gurupurab, Bandi Chhor Divas, etc.
