= Punjabi dictionary =

Compilations of words and phrases used in the Punjabi-language

Punjabi dictionaries are compilations of words and phrases used in the Punjabi-language and its dialects. Punjabi dictionaries were first published in the 19th century by printing presses operated by Christian missionaries. Punjabi dictionaries exist in romanized Punjabi, Gurmukhi, and Shahmukhi, or combinations of the three. Both monolinguial and bilingual dictionaries exist, including Punjabi and another language (such as English, Hindi, Russian, etc.). Also existing are dialectal and technical dictionaries. The dictionaries have impacted the field of Punjabi lexicography. A large number of such dictionaries have been published, especially by the Languages Department in Patiala, various universities, textbook boards, and individual scholars. Due to interactions with contact languages, Punjabi contains loanwords from languages like Arabic, English, Hindi-Urdu, Persian, Sanskrit, Turkish, and others, with most of these words having been adapted while English loanwords (usually relating to science and technology) have yet to be adapted to Punjabi fully.

== Terminology and structure ==
In the Punjabi language, the word nirukat refers to an etymology, pariyay/priya/prayais refers to a glossary, and kosh refers to a dictionary.

Many Punjabi dictionaries do not merely classify words as tatsamas, tadbhavas, or ardhatatsamas, but go beyond and use additional categorizations:

1. Sanskritic tatsamas
2. Ardhatatsamas
3. Prakrit tadbhavas
4. Braj tadbhavas
5. Punjabic tadbhavas
6. Borrowed – (a) from Perso-Arabic, (b) others, including English, French, Portuguese, as well as words of unknown origin

Prakrit tadbhavas and Braj tadbhavas mostly occur in Sikh scriptures. Punjabi has adopted a high amount of Perso-Arabic borrowings. Perso-Arabic borrowings (nouns and adjectives in-particular) being used as proper names for both Sikhs and Hindus is a unique trait that Punjabi has amongst Indo-Aryan languages. There often exists a Sanskritic tatsama, Perso-Arabic borrowing, and Punjabic tadbhava for synonymous words.

== Dictionaries translating between Punjabi and English ==
=== Background ===
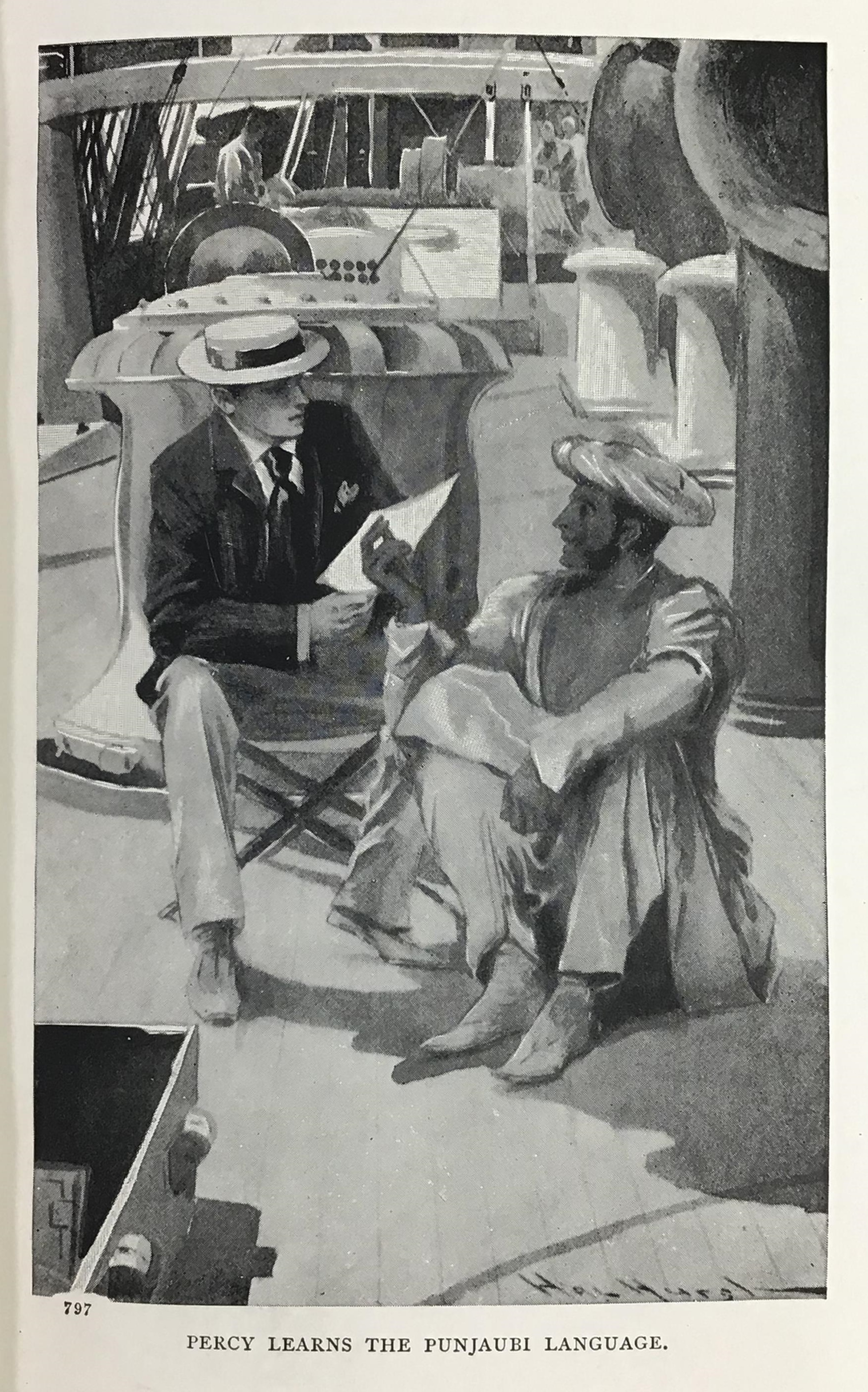
Illustration captioned 'Percy learns the Punjaubi language.', published in 'Through the Sikh War, A Tale of the Conquest of the Punjaub', by George Alfred Henty, ca.1900's

Punjabi lexicography can be traced back to the efforts by Christian missionaries. According to Jeffrey M. Diamond, the Christian missionaries had a better understanding of Punjabi linguistics than the colonial administrators. Punjabi, in Gurmukhi-script, was first printed by printing presses run by Christian missionaries, such as the Serampore Mission Press in Bengal and the Ludhiana Mission Press in Punjab. They established these printing presses to spread Christianity amongst the natives of the Indian subcontinent. In May 1806, the Serampore Mission Press began to experiment with printing in Punjabi, employing Gurmukhi script. In early reports by the Serampore Mission, they referred to the Punjabi-language and Gurmukhi-script as "Seek" (a reference to Sikhs, a term used interchangeably by the printing press for the Punjabi-language in Gurmukhi script and for Sikhs). By 1808, a type of Gurmukhi had already been developed by the press. The first Punjabi work printed in Gurmukhi characters with movable type began as early as 1809. The European missionaries were likely assisted by native pundits (for translating, punchcutting, and printing) and craftsmen in the creation of design or production of these types and the creation of letterforms. The first known Gurmukhi metal types were cut by Monohur (of the Karmakāra caste) or by unknown Indian assistants under the supervision of William Ward of the Serampore Mission Press. A Sikh man, named Ajnaram, assisted William Carey by translating the first ninety-two hymns of the Guru Granth Sahib. Ajnaram was paid a sum of five gold mohurs for his translation work. Ajnaram likely assisted the missionaries by translating texts into Punjabi and the development of printing types.

Regarding the Punjabi-language, the Serampore Mission Press stated the following in one of its memoirs:

The language of the Seeks is a modification of the Hindee, and has nearly the same affinity with the Sungskrit. Although so nearly allied to the Hindee, however, its grammatical terminations are different, and it has a different character, to which the Seeks are so much attached, that the mere circumstance of a book being written in it, recommends it strongly to their notice. These considerations have determined us to attempt alluring this nation to the perusal of the sacred word by presenting it to them in their vernacular language and character. A learned Seek, eminently skilled in Sungskrit has been for some time retained for this purpose, and the translation has advanced to the Gospel by John. [sic]

— J. W. Morris (Dunstable, 1808), First Serampore memoir relative to the translations of the sacred Scriptures to the Baptist Missionary Society in England

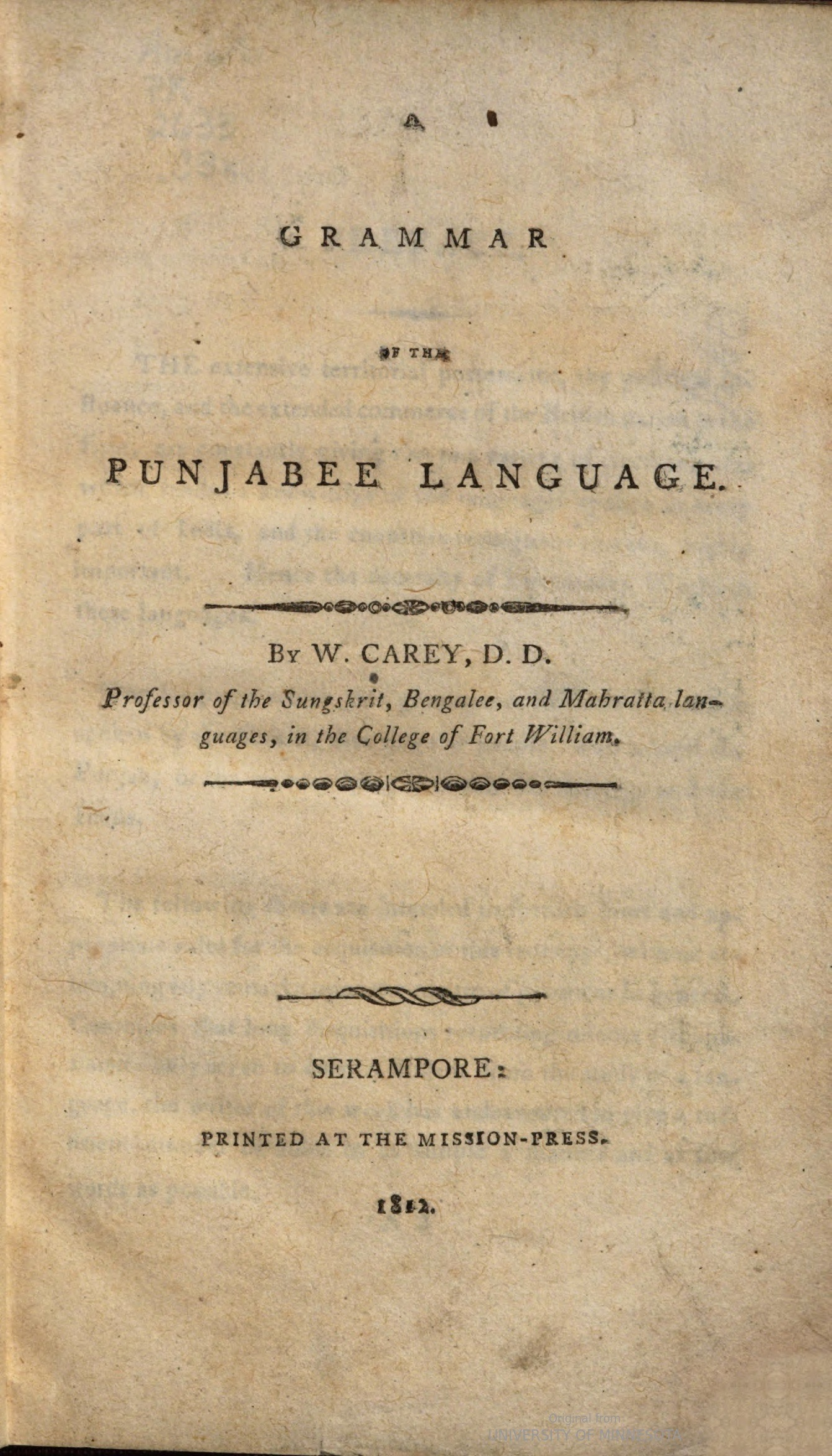
Title-page of 'A Grammar of the Punjabee Language' (1812) by William Carey of the Serampore Mission Press, actually published in early 1813

The New Testament was translated into Gurmukhi Punjabi by the Serampore Mission in 1811. The first non-religious book printed in Punjabi (Gurmukhi) was a grammar book (containing vocabulary), titled A Grammar of the Punjabee Language, by the Serampore Mission Press, published in early 1813 (although the published print bears the year 1812). Whilst Carey had begun printing the grammar book in 1811, a fire broke out at the Serampore Mission Press in 1812 that destroyed most of the work that had already been completed up til that point, so he again had to work alongside pundits, whom re-translated the work so a new edition could be brought-out. The Serampore Mission established various schools, such as the Serampore School (est. 1818), for the original purpose of spreading Christianity in India but later for theological studies and education of native Indians. These educational pursuits led the Serampore Mission to start publishing dictionaries, grammars, and scholastic textbooks, relating to local Indian languages.

The following sheets are intended to furnish short and appropriate rules for acquisition of this language, without attempting any remarks upon the nature of grammar in general. Conscious that long disquisitions respecting minute circumstances only serve to deter a student from the study of a language, the writer of this work has endeavoured to give a sufficient number of rules in as simple a manner and as few words as possible. The Shikhs [sic] follow the religion founded by Nanuka, the precepts of which are contained in a large volume, called, emphatically, the Gruntha, or The Writing, which is written in a peculiar character called Gooroo-Mokhee Naguree; on which account they have a peculiar veneration for that character, and, with few exceptions, use it in all their transactions. That character is therefore used in the following work, as that which properly belong to the language.

— William Carey (Serampore, Serampore Mission Press, 1812), A Grammar of the Punjabee Language, Preface

In 1838, another grammar book on Punjabi, also titled A Grammar of the Punjabee Language, by Lieutenant John Leech of the Bombay Engineers, was published. Leech's Punjabi grammar book utilizes romanized Punjabi, with some Devanagari and Perso-Arabic usage as well. Leech must have published his grammar book without knowledge of the previous Punjabi grammar book of the same name that had earlier been published by William Carey. This publication was followed in 1849 by yet another grammar book on Punjabi by Captain Samuel Cross Starkey, whom was a British Colonial Officer in India. Starkey's grammar book only employs romanized Punjabi with no usage of native scripts. These early works showcase that not only were there merely religious motivations for improving communication between Europeans and Indians and producing literature on Indian languages, but there were also military reasons for doing-so.

Later, the Ludhiana Mission was established in the Punjab due to the "almost total lack of a Christian presence". The missionaries associated with the Ludhiana Mission brought with them Persian, Gurmukhi, Devanagari, and Latin fonts to the Punjab from Calcutta, which allowed them to print literature in the various lects found in the Punjab. The Ludhiana Mission used the same kind of Gurmukhi font that had been previously cast and used by the earlier Serampore Mission. In 1846, during the First Anglo-Sikh War, the Ludhiana Mission Press published a work titled Idiomatic Sentences in English and Panjabi, which mostly covered military concerns, judicial situation, and medical information. However, the printing press faced difficulties in compiling this 1846 publication as there was still no established translating scheme between the English and Punjabi languages in use by the missionaries at Ludhiana.

The Ludhiana Mission Press, under the supervision of Reverend James Porter, published a grammar book on Punjabi by John Newton, titled A Grammar of the Panjabi Language; With Appendices in 1851. The motivation for publishing this grammar book was due to the aftermath of the annexation of much of Punjab in 1849 after the downfall of the Sikh Empire resulting from the Second Anglo-Sikh War. Many British colonial officials, only familiar with Urdu, began coming into Punjab after the 1849 annexation, so this work attempts to instruct them in the local Punjabi-language. Newton's Punjabi grammar book does make explicit mention of the previous grammar book that was written by William Carey, however whilst being sympathetic, Newton does note inaccuracies in Carey's earlier work. Newton's grammar book focuses mostly on how Punjabi grammar differs from Urdu grammar, rather than being solely dedicated to the comprehensive study of Punjabi's grammar itself. Newton's grammar book is divided into two main partitions: orthography and orthoepy (including syntax), with these main sections being divided into smaller parts based on adjectives, nouns, adverbs, pronouns, interjections, conjunctions, verbs, etc. Newton's Punjabi grammar book would later be republished in 1866, owing to its acclaim and popularity.

A push for compiling the Punjabi dictionary may have come from the East India Company's language policies, as they were long eager to replace the Persian-language as the language of administration with local vernacular languages instead, requesting assistance from mission presses to publish grammar books and dictionaries to assist with this effort to move toward local vernaculars from Persian.

=== First Punjabi dictionaries ===
The first Punjabi dictionary was A Dictionary, English and Punjabee, Outlines of Grammar, Also Dialogues, English and Punjabee, With Grammar and Explanatory Notes published in Calcutta in 1849. This dictionary authored by Captain Samuel Cross Starkey, whom was assisted in its compilation by jemadar Bussawa Singh. This dictionary was 256-pages and gave the Punjabi translation for 11,000 English words, all in the Latin script.

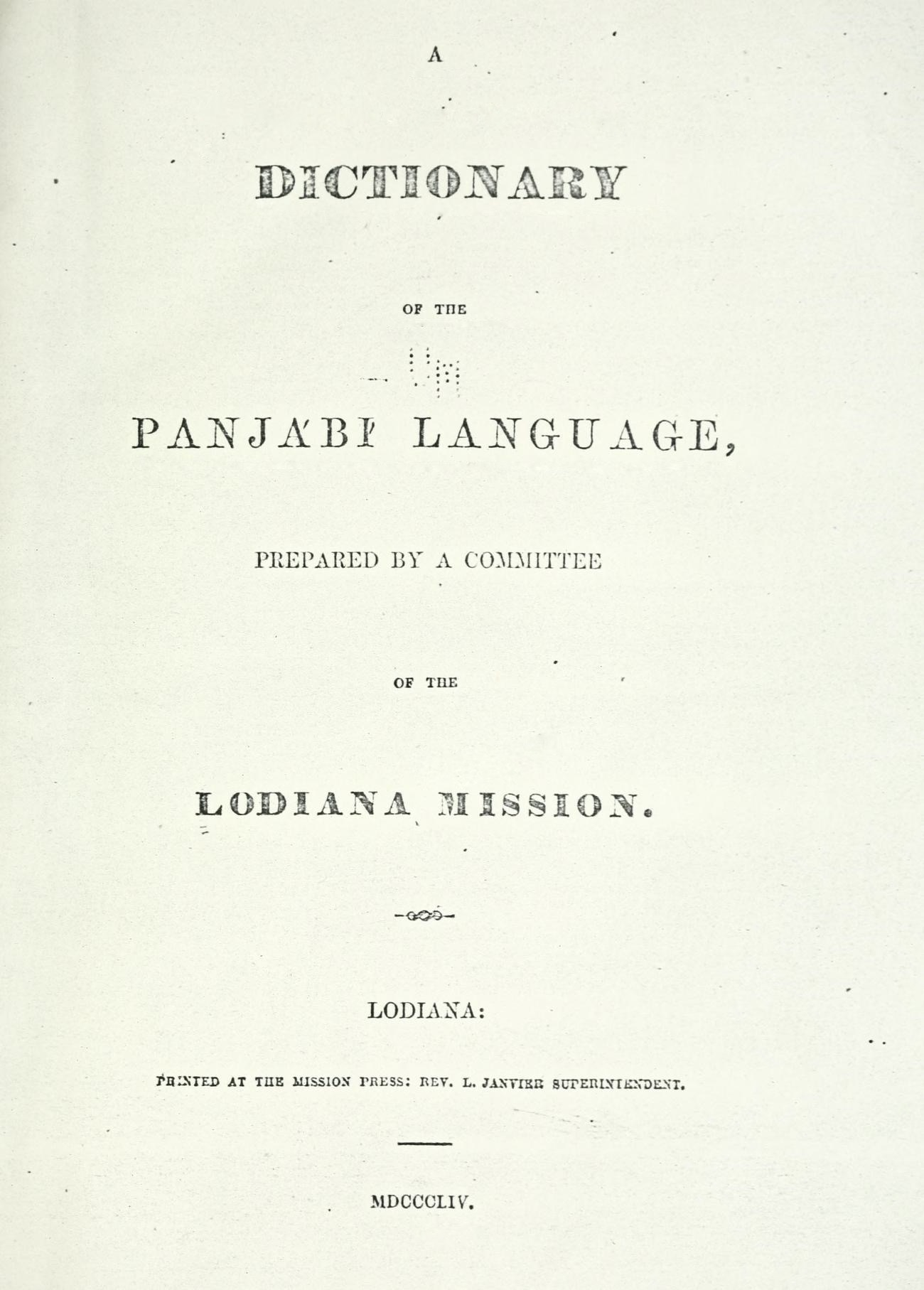
Title-page of 'A Dictionary of the Panjabi Language' by the Ludhiana Mission (1854)

The grammar book of the Ludhiana Press was followed in 1854 by the publication of a Punjabi dictionary, titled A Dictionary of the Panjabi Language, also published by the Ludhiana Mission Press in 1854. This Punjabi dictionary published by the Ludhiana Mission Press had been a work a long time in the making, with it first being worked on by John Newton James Porter and Levi Janiver also assisted with the compilation of the dictionary. In 1841, the annual meeting of the mission gave Newton approval to begin compiling a Punjabi dictionary to assist those wanting to learn the Punjabi language, however Newton had already been collecting material to assist with compiling such a dictionary before this. However, John Newton was preoccupied with other duties of running the printing press and it was tedious work compiling the dictionary, leading to the dictionary being pushed-back by twelve years. Progress of the dictionary was also effected by the departure of prominent missionaries at the press, such as the loss of Reese Morris, and a fire that occurred at the printing press, shortage of funds, and difficulties acquiring printing paper. When the press finally recuperated its losses and restored itself, Newton resumed work on compiling a Punjabi dictionary. In the Twelfth annual report of the Board of Foreign Missions of the Presbyterian Church, the missionaries of the press happily reported that almost 20,000 Punjabi words had been collected and arranged, with there being 8,000 fully complete translations into English of these collected words, with 6,000 partial translations yet to be completed, with the rest of the word remaining to have any translation work conducted on them.

The labour involved in this work is exceedingly arduous. Mr Newton has been engaged in it, more or less, for several years, and is, no doubt, better qualified than any other person, to do justice to such an undertaking. It will form a valuable contribution to the general literature of the Hindus, and an indispensable auxiliary to all foreigners, whether missionaries or others, with that portion of the people of the Punjab who speak the Sikh language. In the meantime, Mr Newton has nearly ready for the press a Grammar and a Vocabulary of the same language [sic].

— Board of Missions (New York, 1849), Report of the Board of the Foreign Mission of the Presbyterian Church in the United States of America (annual report no. 12)

However, in 1850 work on the dictionary yet again was stalled due to the opening of the Lahore Mission, with many missionaries that were posted at the Ludhiana Mission being transferred there, including Newton himself. The dictionary was finally published in 1854 under the supervision of Levi Janiver, with a note in its preface written by John Newton noting four noteworthy remarks about the dictionary:

1. The dictionary does not contain all the words used in the Punjabi language (the entirety of the Punjabi lexis is not fully represented).
2. Some words found in the dictionary might not be in common circulation anymore.
3. He describes the romanization style as being "Shakespearean modified to suit the peculiarities of the Panjábí language", which is similar to the precursor grammar book.
4. The ਅ (áiṛá) and ਉ (uṛá) glyphs of Gurmukhi script have swapped places in-order, similar to how they arranged in the previous grammar book, whilst the rest of the thirty-five Gurmukhi letters (known as the paintí) are arranged the same way as they are locally by natives.

The Lahore Mission's 1854 Punjabi dictionary contained 438 triple-columned pages filled with around 25,000 words, mostly sourced from the dialect of Punjabi that was then spoken in and around Ludhiana. The dictionary contained both Latin and Gurmukhi scripts and was arranged according to the traditional ordering of the Gurmukhi letters (apart from the exception noted above involving the first two letters). John Newton and Levi Janiver were both praised by the mission after the publication of the dictionary, with the cost of producing the work almost being fully recuperated by its sales, proving that it was a useful resource for Christian missionaries and other people interested in learning the Punjabi-language. The 1854 Ludhiana Mission dictionary would inspire later colonial-era Punjabi vocabularies, glossaries, and dictionaries.

=== Later colonial-era dictionaries ===
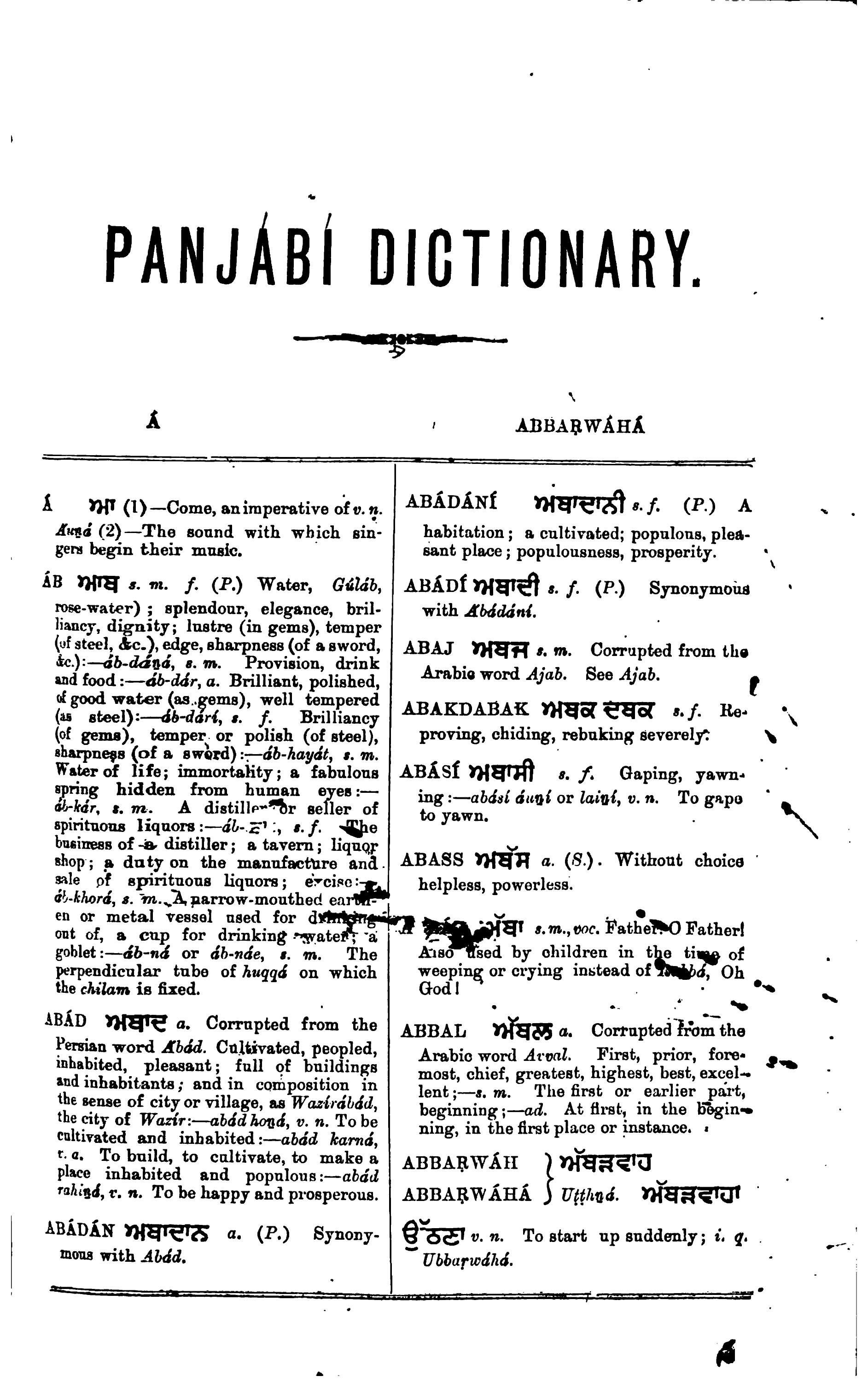
First content-page of definitions from Maya Singh's dictionary ('The Panjábí Dictionary', Munshi Gulab Singh & Sons, 1895)

Later colonial-era Punjabi dictionaries were either published as stand-alone books, as part of district settlement reports, or as an appendice adjoined to district gazetteers. Maya Singh, whom was an early member of the Lahore Singh Sabha and an editor of the Khalsa Gazette, was requested by Denzil Ibbetson to produce a lengthy Punjabi dictionary. Maya Singh's dictionary was eventually compiled and published in 1895 as a brief-entry dictionary, titled simply as The Panjábí Dictionary, under the supervision of the Punjab Textbook Committee, Lahore. Maya Singh's dictionary was mostly based upon the 1854 Ludhiana Mission dictionary, however it was ground-breaking in that it was a wide-ranging lexicography that was carried-out in a methodical manner. Maya Singh's dictionary was printed with 1221 large-sized, double-columned pages representing around 40,000 Punjabi words. Furthermore, it also contained usages, idioms, and dialectal variations for each entry. The information for the dialectal variations of Punjabi words utilized existing glossaries published on various dialects, with nearly all of the Punjabic dialects being represented in the work. Maya Singh's dictionary utilized both Latin and Gurmukhi scripts and it was arranged as per the order of the English alphabet, with the Punjabi headword being written in both Gurmukhi and Latin scripts. Addendums of Maya Singh's dictionary were later made by Horace Arthur Rose and also Thomas Grahame Bailey. A Shahmukhi version of Maya Singh's dictionary was prepared by Maqsood Saqib and published by Vanguard Books at Lahore in 1983.

In 1918, the University of Punjab, Lahore began a project of compiling a fully complete, consolidated, and comprehensive Punjabi-English dictionary due to solicitations, by George Abraham Grierson and the Punjab Government, of such a volume needing to be created. This effort was taken-on by Banarsidas, whom was supervised by Alfred Cooper Woolner. Banarsidas, Woolner, and their assistant spent the next 10 years compiling this dictionary by collecting the required materials and following a scientific method. Punjabi words were arranged according to the alphabetical order of English. Four scripts would be employed in this dictionary: Latin, Gurmukhi, Devanagari, and Persian scripts. When nearing completion, the dictionary was divided into twenty-six volumes, containing around 80,000 Punjabi words and idioms in-sum across all the volumes. Between 1941–42, Banarsidas updated the draft of the dictionary and Teja Singh revised it between 1943–45 at Khalsa College, Amritsar. However, just when the printing of the dictionary finally began in 1947, pre-partition riots broke-out in Lahore, which led to the cancellation of the publishing of the dictionary. The unpublished manuscript of the dictionary remains locked-up at the Punjabi University's library in Lahore to this day.

==== List of later colonial-era dictionaries ====
A list of other later colonial-era Punjabi dictionaries are as follows:

- In 1895, A Vocabulary of Two Thousand Words from English Into Punjabi, by munshi Jawahar Singh, was published at Lahore. (Note: The name of the compiler of the 1895 dictionary is alternatively spelt as 'Jawahir Singh'.) Jawahar Singh's work was mostly meant to be used by army officers.
- In 1897, a dictionary, titled Anglo-Gurmukhi Dictionary, by Lala Saligram Bajaj, was an early attempt at creating a regular English-Punjabi dictionary. Lala Saligram Bajaj's dictionary featured 649 double-columned pages where Punjabi translations of English words are offered in Gurmukhi script. This dictionary was printed at Lahore.
- In 1898, another Punjabi dictionary published in Ludhiana by the Ludhiana Mission, titled Panjábí Grammar, With Exercises and Vocabulary, authored by Reverend E. P. Newton, was released.
- In 1919, a Punjabi dictionary, simply titled as English-Punjabi Dictionary, was published at Calcutta, being authored by Reverend Thomas Grahame Bailey of the Scottish Mission in Wazirabad. This dictionary contained 5,800 words, including their Latin script equivalents, to assist Europeans learning the Punjabi language to converse with locals.
- In 1929, an English-to-Punjabi dictionary, titled An English-Punjabi Dictionary, by Rev. Canon Walter Pullin Hares (of the Church Missionary Society, Gojra), was published by the Civil and Military Gazette press. This dictionary was a landmark achievement in Punjabi lexicography, as it contains 15,000 English words with around 55,000 romanized Punjabi equivalents.
- Angrezi-Punjabi Kosh by Khush Lal Singh.
- Punjabi Arthawali by Amar Nath, an English-to-Punjabi dictionary featuring Punjabi translations of English words in both Latin and Persian scripts.
- Punjabi-Angrezi Kosh by Khushhal Singh (Lahore, 1946). Based upon Maya Singh's dictionary.
- Punjabi-English Vocabulary, a small lexicon published by the Sri Guru Singh Sabha, Lahore. Mostly derived from Maya Singh's dictionary.

==== Dialect or region-specific colonial-era dictionaries ====
Missionaries and officers of British India also produced Punjabi dictionaries focusing on Punjabic lects spoken in particular regions. Some examples are as follows:

- Glossary of the Multani Language Compared with Punjábi and Sindhi (Lahore, 1880) by Edward O'Brien – covering the Multani lect found in southwestern Punjab (now classified as a dialect of Saraiki). This work features a series of thematic glossaries and a Punjab-English glossary.
- Grammar and Dictionary of Western Panjabi, as Spoken in the Shahpur District, With Proverbs, Sayings, & Verses (Lahore, 1899) by James Wilson – covering the Shahpuri dialect.
- Dictionary of the Jatki or Western Panjábi Language (London, 1900) by Reverend Andrew Jukes of the Church Missionary Society of Derajats – covering the Jatki dialect.

=== Post-independence dictionaries ===
After the independence of India and Pakistan, the Punjabi dictionaries that had been published during the colonial-era were unsuitable for the demands of that time. This is because earlier dictionaries were limited in scope as they had been mostly compiled to serve foreigners, such as the colonial administration/officials and Christian missionaries. These earlier dictionaries neglected special areas of interest, which were to the detriment of developing Punjabi into a language of administration, scholarship, and instruction, in post-independence India. In 1948, the Publication Bureau of Punjab University in Shimla began working on compiling a comprehensive English-Punjabi dictionary to meet the requirements of the day, with the Concise Oxford Dictionary serving as its English vocabulary base. This project was undertaken by Teja Singh with the assistance of Harnam Singh 'Shan'. Due to the sudden decline of Teja Singh's health, only the first part of the dictionary was published in 1953, titled as The Standard English-Punjabi Dictionary. However, a comprehensive Punjabi-English lexicon, to the same magnitude as the unpublished draft manuscript that was prepared by the University of Punjab (Lahore), has yet to be completed post-1947. Many Punjabi dictionaries, both reprints and new works, are published by universities located in the state. Punjabi lexicographers, unlike grammarians, utilize older dictionaries when compiling new ones, attempting to maximize their coverage of the language. An English-Punjabi online dictionary, containing around 40,000 head-words (including scientific and technological jargon), was released by Punjabi University, Patiala in 2011, after having been developed by the university's Department of Linguistics and Punjabi Lexicography. In 2016, a software called Akhar, developed by the team of Gurpreet Singh Lehal from the Centre for Punjabi Language Technology of Punjabi University, was released. The 2021 version of Akhar, known as Akhar-2021, features a Punjabi-English dictionary function and a Gurmukhi-to-Shahmukhi transliterator. Many Punjabi dictionaries available today are digital, app-based dictionaries, such as U-Dictionary. PILAC in Pakistan is planning on compiling a Punjabi-English dictionary.

A list of some Punjabi dictionaries from post-1947 are as follows:

- Punjabi-Angreji Shabadkosh (Amritsar, 1954) – jointly compiled by Saran Singh, Gurcharan Singh, and Tara Singh Sethi. It was mostly based on Maya Singh's 1895 dictionary and utilized for general purposes by students.
- Anglo-Punjabi Dictionary (Teja Singh, Ludhiana, 1955) – this dictionary was prepared by Teja Singh after his health got better. It is a concise version of the earlier dictionary he began working on with Harnam Singh 'Shan'. This dictionary contains 504 double-columned pages and was very influential in the future path of modern English-Punjabi dictionaries.
- Many practical Punjabi dictionaries, meant for students, were authored by S. S. Amole, Nihal Singh 'Ras', Bakhshish Singh, and Sant Ram Grover.
- English-Punjabi Dictionary (Department of Punjabi Literary Studies, Punjabi University, Patiala, 1968) – this dictionary features 703 double-columned pages. A revised edition, led by Gurdit Singh 'Premi', was published in 1971.
- PSUTB English-Punjabi Dictionary (Punjab State University Textbook Board, 1982) – this large-scale, brief-entry dictionary was the finalization of The Standard English-Punjabi Dictionary project that had been begun by Punjab University, Chandigarh. The stalled project was eventually revived and taken over by a collaborative effort between the department of lexicography and the Punjab State University Textbook Board. The chief-editors of this dictionary were Attar Singh and Balbir Singh Sandhu. It is a very large dictionary, containing 1407 large-sized, double-columned pages. The pronunciation of English words is displayed in Gurmukhi in bold-face that is aligned to the right-side of every colomn.
- Panjabi-Angrezi Lughat (Kanwal Bashir and Abbas Kazmi, Dunwoody Publishing & Press, 2012) – a Punjabi-English dictionary. The first edition of the dictionary features 2,500 main word entries arranged according to their frequency of use. Each entry features the head-word written in Shahmukhi, a romanization, pronunciation, parts of speech, and the definition. The end of the dictionary features appendices, such as a verb chart and a grammar.

== Dictionaries translating between Punjabi and non-English languages ==
- Kosh Gurmukhī Zabān Malāī (Lahore, 1909), a Malay-Gurmukhi dictionary by Ramji Das Sehgal
- Hindi-Punjabi Kosh (Patiala, 1953) – a Hindi-Punjabi dictionary that was compiled by Sant Indar Singh Chakarvarti and published by the Punjabi Department, PEPSU, Patiala (now called the Languages Department of the Punjab Government). It contains 862 large-sized, double-columned pages that provide Punjabi translations for 60,000 Hindi words. The Hindi words are written using Devanagari whilst the Punjabi translations are written in Gurmukhi.
- Hindi Words Common to Other Indian Languages: Hindi-Punjabi (Central Hindi Directorate of the Ministry of Education, Government of India, New Delhi, 1960)
- Urdu-Punjabi-Hindi Kosh (Languages Department, Punjab Government, 1968)
- Punjabi Hindi-Kosh (1974)
- Romani-Punjabi-Angrezi Dictionary (1981) by Weer Rajendra Rishi.
- Punjabi-Urdu Dictionary (Sachal Studios and the Punjabi Adabi Board, 2009) by Sardar Mohammad Khan. A Punjabi-Urdu dictionary that covers 64 varieties of Punjabi over around 3,600 pages, containing idioms, riddles, and treatises related to Punjabi traditions and customs. The author is an ethnic Pathan. A small part of the dictionary was published as Punjabi Urdu Lughat in 1965 under his wife's name.
- Punjabi Urdu Lughat (Urdu Science Board, Lahore, 2008) – by Tanvir Bokhari.
- Pothohari Urdu Lughat (Zauraiz Publications, Multan, 2008) – a Pothohari-Urdu dictionary by Muhammad Sharif Shad.

== Monolingual Punjabi dictionaries ==
Whilst examples of pre-1947 Punjabi-Punjabi dictionaries do exist, they mostly began to be produced after independence in 1947. The most notable Punjabi dictionary of this type was one that began to be worked upon initially for the purpose of cultivating Punjabi as a state language of PEPSU (Patiala and East Punjab States Union). This project began in 1948, with the task of compiling such a dictionary being the responsibility of Ranjit Singh Gill and Giani Lal Singh, with the projected being assigned to Banarsidas. However, Banarsidas retired in 1954, so this responsibility was transferred to Jit Singh Sital, and after him to Dalip Singh. Dalip Singh had a group of scholars and linguists to help him compile the dictionary. In 1955, the first volume of the dictionary was published. It took until 1983 for the sixth and final volume of the dictionary to be published by the Language Department of Punjab in Patiala. This dictionary is titled as Punjabi Kosh and it contains 3500 large-sized, double-columned pages which contain around 150,000 entries. Its entries cover subsidiary formations, usages, idioms, proverbs, and other linguistic aspects. The system of the dictionary is as follows: forms of the head-word give grammatical form, etymology, semantic distinction, dialectical formation, various shades of meaning, and providing many illustrations to describe the words. The creation of a dictionary for Lahndi and Malwai dialects was proposed in 1958. On 26 February 2014, Punjabi University launched Punjabipedia, a Punjabi-language encyclopedia website that features entries from Punjabi dictionaries. The Punjab Institute of Language, Art and Culture (PILAC) in Pakistan has published a large Punjabi-Punjabi dictionary. PILAC's dictionary spans seven volumes and was compiled over two years by a team of 10–15 researchers under the purview of Sughra Sadaf.

=== List of monolingual Punjabi dictionaries ===
Examples of dictionaries of this type are as follows:

- Punjabi Shabad Bhandar (Lahore, 1922) – compiled by Bhai Bishandas Puri under the supervision of the Punjab Textbook Committee, Lahore.
- Punjabi Shabad-Joar by Teja Singh (Punjabi Department of PEPSU, Patiala, 1951) – a spelling dictionary.
- Shabad Ratnakar Arthat Punjabi Shabadkosh by Giani Nihal Singh Ras (Jalandhar, 1954).
- Parmanik Punjabi Kosh by Kartar Singh (first part published in Ludhiana, 1963).
- Punjabi Shabad-Rup Te Shabad-Joar Kosh compiled by Harkirat Singh (Punjabi University, Patiala, published in separate fascicle installments in 1966, 1968, 1980, and 1982) – a spelling dictionary.
- Punjabi Paryaye Ate Viparayaye by Gulwant Singh, Prem Parkash Singh, and Jeet Singh Sital (Punjabi University, Patiala, 1968) – a dictionary covering synonyms and antonyms, containing 192 pages.
- Punjabi Ucharan Dictionary by Mohammad Khan (1982) – spelling dictionary published in Pakistani Punjab that contains 12,000 Punjabi words written in Perso-Arabic script over 176 pages.
- Vaddi Panjabi Lughat: Panjabi Tun Panjabi (Aziz Publishers, Lahore, 2002) – a comprehensive Punjabi-Punjabi dictionary by Muhammad Iqbal Salah-ud-Din. It was published in three volumes.

==== Dialects and regional languages ====
Punjabi dictionaries covering dialects and regional languages (some formerly classified as Punjabic) include:

- Pothohari Shabad Kosh (Language Department, Punjab Government, 1960) – covering Pothohari dialect.
- Puedhi Shabad Kosh (Language Department, Punjab Government, 1960) – covering Puadhi dialect.
- Kangri Shabad-Sangrah (Language Department, Punjab Government, 1964) – covering Kangri, now classified as part of the Western Pahari languages.
- Malwai Shabad Kosh by Manmandar Singh – covering the Malwai dialect.
- Lehndi Kosh by Hardev Bahri – covering Lahnda (Western Punjabi).
- Khalsaee Bole by Jawala Singh – covering the Khalsa Bole lect spoken by Nihang Sikhs.
- Lughat-e-Saraiki – Saraiki dictionary by Bashir Ahmad Zami Bahawlpuri.
- Saraiki Samal – Saraiki dictionary by Jamshed Kamtar Rasoolpur.
- Pehli Wadi Saraiki Lughat (Saraiki Area Study Centre, Bahauddin Zakriya University, Multan, 2007) – a comprehensive Saraiki dictionary by Mohammad Saadullah Khan Khetran.

== Specialized and technical dictionaries ==
Punjabi dictionaries, including monolingual, bilingual, and trilingual types, covering jargon from specialized fields and technical aspects, were published by individual authors and institutions. The publishing of specialized Punjabi dictionaries increased after independence in 1947 as Punjabi was refined for the purpose of being used as an administrative, legal, medical, educational, and academic language. The Book Board of Chandigarh has published a technical dictionary covering various fields.

=== List of specialized and technical dictionaries ===
==== Medical ====
- Chakitsa Kosh by Sadhu Gurdit Singh (published in four parts, Amritsar, 1888) – medical dictionary containing the Punjabi translations of yunani and ayurvedic terminology and medicine names).
- Aukhadh Parkash Arthat Yunani Vaidikda Kosh by Giani Gurbakhsh Singh (Amritsar, 1890) – medical dictionary.
- Nighant Vaidik Kosh by Sewa Singh Grover (Amritsar) – medical dictionary.
- Nighant Yunani Kosh by Surat Singh (Ludhiana, 1911) – medical dictionary.
- Doktorki Shabdavali (Punjabi University, Patiala) – medical science dictionary for higher-education.

==== Legal ====
- Qanuni Sanket Kosh by justices Lachmandas Kaushal and Ranjit Singh Sarkaria (Patiala, 1950) – a bilinguial dictionary giving meanings in both Hindi and Punjabi of around 10,000 legal words/terms over 570 pages.
- Anglo-Punjabi Dictionary of Legal Terms by sessions judge Bhagat Singh (Patiala, 1953) – covering around 20,000 legal terms.
- Qanuni Shabdavali by Rajinder Singh (Bhasha Vibhag, Patiala, 1970) – law dictionary.

==== Financial ====
- Shabad Kosh (Patiala, 1949) – an English-Punjabi dictionary of terms for the PEPSU state budget of 1949–50.

==== Administration ====
- Angrezi-Hindi-Punjabi Parbandhiki Shabdavali (Bhasha Vibhag, Patiala, 1968).
- Lokparshasan (Punjab State University Textbook Board, Chandigarh, 1976) – public administration dictionary for university students.
- Lok Parshasan Shabdavali (Punjabi University, Patiala) – public administration dictionary for higher-education.

==== Education ====
- Angrezi-Punjabi Takniki Shabadavali: Itihas (Bhasha Vibhag, Patiala, 1969) – English-Punjabi glossary to be used for history students.
- Angrezi-Punjabi Takniki Shabdavali: Itihas (Punjab State University Textbook Board, Chandigarh, 1973) – history dictionary for university students.
- Bhugolik Shabdavali (Punjabi University, Patiala) – geography dictionary for higher-education.

==== Literature ====
- Sahitya Sanket by Diwan Singh and Premparkash Singh (Jalandhar, 1956) – dictionary on literary terms.

==== Miscellaneous ====
- Handbook of the Economic Products and of the Manufactures and Arts of the Punjab by B. H. Baden-Powell (published in two volumes, first in Roorkee, 1868, second in Lahore, 1872) – combined index and glossary of technical vernacular words.
- A Complete Dictionary of the Terms Used by the Criminal Tribes of the Punjab by Mohammad Abdul Ghafur (Lahore, 1879) – also containing concise histories of each tribe.
- A Detailed Analysis of Abdul Ghafur's Dictionary of the Terms Used by the Criminal Tribes of the Punjab by W. G. Leitner (Lahore, 1880).
- Glossary of Punjabi religious terms by Horace Arthur Rose (published in Indian Antiquary, volume 33, 1904).
- Technical Terms in Punjabi (Punjab Textbook Committee, Lahore, 1930) – an English-Punjabi dictionary on technical terms.
- Angrezi Punjabi Sanketavali (Patiala, 1951) – a Punjabi dictionary covering eleven disciplines.
- Punjabi Klasiki Lughat (Punjabi Science Board, Lahore, 1993) – a Punjabi classical dictionary by Jamil Paul.

== Sikh scriptural dictionaries ==
The origins of Sikh religious-based Punjabi dictionaries can be traced back to early lexicons, dictionaries, and glossaries meant to record and describe the lexis of Sikh scriptures, mainly the primary canon which is the Guru Granth Sahib. An early sample of such a kind of dictionary are three glossary manuscripts known as Paryaye that are preserved in the Bavarian State Library in Munich. These manuscripts were collected by Ernest Trumpp during his time at Lahore in 1871. The Paryaye describe archaic and obsolete local words but also loanwords from Arabic and Persian, that were employed in Sikh scripture. Trumpp would later publish his own dictionary of the Sikh scriptures, titled A Dictionary of the Adi-Granth (Lahore-Munich, 1872), however the manuscript is lost. Trumpp would publish a full translation of the Guru Granth Sahib into English in 1877 but his translation was strongly rebuked and criticized by Sikhs as being biased against their religion. In 1892, Visnu Das Udasi published the Ādi Granthdā Kōsha, a glossary of the scripture. In 1893–94, Bawa Bishan Das published Ād Śrī Gurú Granth Sāhib Jí dá Kosh, covering the meanings of words occurring in the scripture. Many of the Sikh dictionaries are monolingual Punjabi works.

=== List of Sikh scriptural dictionaries ===
Other Sikh dictionaries are as follows:

- Paryaye Sri Guru Granth Sahibji-ke by Daya Singh (Amritsar, 1887).
- Sri Guru Granth Kosh by Giani Hazara Singh (Amritsar, 1889) – this dictionary would be revised numerous times into further editions, with a 2nd (nine small parts, Amritsar, 1923), 3rd (expanded and revised into three volumes of double-columned pages, Amritsar, 1927), and 4th edition (two volumes, Amritsar, 1950 and 1954, later consolidated into one volume in Amritsar, 1982) being published. Vir Singh compiled its third edition. It covers the classical Punjabi-language used in the Guru Granth Sahib. The name of the dictionary translates to "dictionary of the holy book".
- A variety of manuscripts known respectively as Guru Gira Padarthavali Kosh, Sankhep Ekakhari Kosh, and Guru Granth Anekarthi Kosh, by Pandit Bhagwan Singh (Amritsar, circa 1890).
- Adi-Granth Da Kosh by Vishnudas Udasi (Amritsar, 1892).
- Sri Guru Granth Sahibji-ke Madh Se Paryaye Farsi Padan De Jo Ati Kathan The by Giani Bhai Chanda Singh (Amritsar, 1894).
- Guru Girarath Kosh by Tara Singh Narotam (compiled in 1889, published at Patiala State in 1895) – this was the first completed dictionary of the Guru Granth Sahib. It consisted of 717 large-sized pages and influenced the Sikh dictionaries compiled thereafter.
- Paryaye Adi Sri Guru Granth Sahibji-de by Sant Sute Parkash (Amritsar, 1898).
- Kosh Adi Sri Guru Granth Sahibji by Sadhu Bishan Das Udasi, in two volumes (Amritsar, 1898).
- Guru Shabad Ratnakar Mahan Kosh, popularly referred to simply as Mahan Kosh, by Kahn Singh Nabha (1930) – dictionary on classical Sikh literature. It is fully in Punjabi.
- Sri Guru Bani Parkash by Sodhi Teja Singh, in two volumes (1932–1952) – 2nd edition published at Amritsar in 1953 by the Shiromani Gurdwara Parbandhak Committee.
- Kosh Adi Granth Sahib by Giani Lal Singh Sangrur (Patiala, 1949).
- Kosh Sri Dasam Granth Sahib by Giani Lal Singh Sangrur, in two volumes (Amritsar, 1954) – dictionary of the Dasam Granth.
- Kosh Adi Guru Granth Sahib by Giani Partap Singh Jotshi (Amritsar, 1958).
- Gurbani Kosh by Piara Singh Padam (Patiala, 1960).
- Varan Bhai Gurdas: Shabad Anukarmnika Ate Kosh by Rattan Singh Jaggi (Patiala, 1966) – dictionary of the Varan of Bhai Gurdas Bhalla.
- Nirukat Sri Guru Granth Sahib by Balbir Singh, with assistance by Mohindar Kaur and G. S. Anand (in two volumes, Patiala, 1972 and 1975)– the first etymological dictionary of the Guru Granth Sahib, published by Punjabi University, Patiala. It contains 484 pages of 22 x 28 size. The first efforts to compile such a work was begun by Vir Singh in his Santhya Sri Guru Granth Sahib (nine volumes), later the effort was taken over and completed by his brother, Balbir Singh.

== Scholarly analysis ==
Punjabi lexicography still remains a nascent field lacking depth due to a variety of organizational and inherent factors. Punjabi dictionaries tend to over-represent nouns and under-represent other word classes, like verbs and adjectives. Punjabi lexicographers give little attention to compound or conjunct verbs. They also tend to group nouns together which may have subtle differences in nuance, misleading the readers into assuming they are the same. Punjabi dictionaries also often enforce particular grammatical gender of nouns and voices of verbs which are not so rigid in the actual language and can vary considerably. Punjabic tadbhavas (including the various patterns of word derivation) tend to be overlooked in Punjabi literature, including dictionaries, due to scholars pursuing literary formalism. In Pakistan, regional languages are neglected in the lexicographical field, with the number of dictionaries available for Punjabi (and Saraiki) lacking, despite the large amounts of people who speak these tongues. According to Kali Charan Bahl, newer Punjabi dictionaries repeat the same fundamental errors as older lexicographers. Sardar Muhammad Khan criticized the adoption of Hindi neologisms by Punjabi Sikh lexicographers in their dictionaries and believed it was causing a Hindization of the Punjabi language in India but also rejected the Urduization of the Punjabi language and its adoption of Urduisms in Pakistan. According to Basil Dogra, the lack of recent publications of comprehensive Punjabi dictionaries has led to the loss of lexical stock.

== See also ==
- Punjabi grammar
