= Sant Bhasha =

Language of Sikh scripture

- ਸੰਤ-ਭਾਸ਼ਾ संत-भाषा
- Region: Northern Indian subcontinent
- Era: Medieval-period to present-day
- Language family: Indo-European: Indo-Iranian; Indo-Aryan; Sant Bhasha
- Early forms: Proto-Indo-European: Proto-Indo-Iranian; Proto-Indo-Aryan; Vedic Sanskrit; Classical Sanskrit; debated Prakrit (Note: Paishachi, Saurasheni, or Gandhari Prakrits have been proposed as the ancestor Middle Indo-Aryan language to Punjabi.); debated Apabhraṃśa; Old Punjabi
- Writing system: Gurmukhi (including Anandpur Lipi)
- Sources: Punjabi (various dialects); regional Prakrits; Apabhramsa; Sanskrit; Hindi languages (Braj, Kauravi, Bangru, Awadhi, Old Hindi, Deccani); Persian; Arabic; Bhojpuri; Sindhi; Marathi; Gujarati; Marwari; Bengali

Language codes
- ISO 639-3: –

Sant Bhasha (Gurmukhi: ਸੰਤ-ਭਾਸ਼ਾ; Devanagari: संत-भाषा; romanized: Sant Bhāṣā; lit. 'language of saints') is a liturgical and scriptural language composed of vocabulary common to northern Indian languages, which was extensively used by saints and poets to compose religious verses. It can be understood by readers with a background in either Punjabi, Hindustani (Hindi-Urdu) and all its associated dialects. Shackle terms it "the sacred language of the Sikhs". Sardar Mohammad Khan uses the word Sikhī to name the language composite.

== Features ==
Sant Bhasha is notable for its high usage of inherited tadbhava and deshaj vocabulary in comparison to Sanskritic tatsama borrowings.

== In Sikhism ==
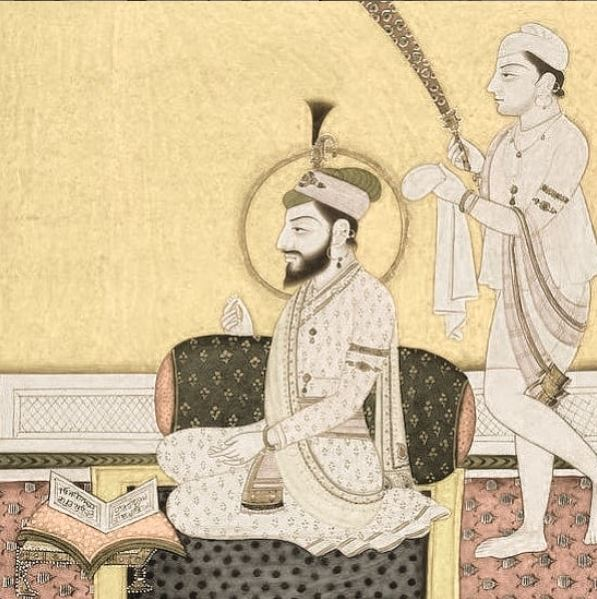
Painting of Guru Arjan being fanned with a book before him. The Sikh gurus employed the Sant Bhasha language for their poetic compositions in the Sikh scriptures.

Sant Bhasha is most prominently used in the central Sikh scripture, the Guru Granth Sahib. The languages used include Punjabi and its dialects, Lahnda, regional Prakrits, Apabhramsa, Sanskrit, Hindustani languages (Braj Bhasha, Bangru (Haryanvi), Awadhi, Old Hindi, Hindi-Urdu, Deccani), Bhojpuri, Sindhi, Marathi, Gujarati, Marwari, Bengali, Persian, and Arabic. While vocabulary from all of these languages is used, Sant Bhasha here is only written in the Gurmukhi script. Guru Nanak likely adopted the vernacular so his works could be more accessible to a larger audience located in the Hindi zone, with Nanak's version of it bearing influences from Punjabi (specifically the central zone of both western and eastern Punjabi influences) and older Apabhraṁśa. According to Christopher Shackle, the language of the Guru Granth Sahib was not Old Punjabi but had been influenced by it. After Guru Arjan, the scriptural language of the Sikhs became more influenced by Braj and Persian.

== See also ==
- Sadhukkari
- Sadhu Bhasha
- Khalsa bole, coded language of Nihang Sikhs
- Sikh scriptures
- Guru Granth Sahib
- Dasam Granth
- Sarbloh Granth
- Sikh culture
- History of Sikhism
