= Baahar di boli =

Baahar di boli (Punjabi: Bāhar dī bōlī, lit. 'language of the outside'), (Note: Gurmukhi: ਬਾਹਰ ਦੀ ਬੋਲੀ, Shahmukhi: باہر دی بولی) also known in English as Diasporic Punjabi, refers to the manner the Punjabi language is spoken outside of its native India and Pakistan, particularly by the Punjabi diaspora. There is no agreed term relating to how to describe the diaspora's manner of speaking Punjabi, as it is littered with words mostly from English (to a greater extent, especially nouns, than is Punjabi in Punjab, which is ṭhēṭh) and occasionally other languages, depending upon where the immigrants ended up. Most came to the West or Southeast Asia. The Western Punjabis have either settled in the United Kingdom (the highest concentration anywhere in the world outside of South Asia), Canada, and the United States. Commonly the literature written in this type of Punjabi is referred to as Parvasi, which literally means "émigré".

The Punjabi immigrants' children speak Punjabi as a second language and have codified it to the grammatical patterns of English. This has resulted in a language often referred to as Hinglish, Urdish, Pinglish (or Punglish). Punjabis settled in the west are known as Vilaytis, and some refer to Baahar di boli as Vilayti (see below). However this is a term that is used by academics in Punjab to describe the diaspora's version of Punjabi. In reality most occidental Punjabis do see it as Punjabi. However the differences are apparent when one reads Western Punjabi novels such as Neela Noor by Rupinderpal Singh Dhillon, or listens to Bhangra mixes by DCS and Bally Sagoo.

In their Anglo-Indian dictionary, Hobson-Jobson, published in 1886, Sir Henry Yule and Arthur Coke Burnell explained that the word came to be used in British India for several things the British had brought into the country, such as the tomato (bilayati baingan, whose literal translation is "foreign aubergine") and soda water, which was commonly called bilayati pani ("foreign water").

There have been several studies that have proven that the Second Generation Punjabis do codify the language to English structure. A sample of children were observed in Birmingham, UK. One such study shows the importance of their heritage language to them. This was conducted by Jean Mills of Brigham University (See references Below). Ramesh Krishnamurthy carried out one of the studies on this as well. There is currently a push to teach Punjabi as a second language to the western born generation.

From their perspective it is Punjabi, Vilayti Punjabi rather than Baahar di boli.
