= Doabi dialect =

Dialect of Punjabi

Doabi
- ਦੁਆਬੀ; دوآبی
- Native to: Punjab; Himachal Pradesh
- Region: Doaba
- Language family: Indo-European: Indo-Iranian; Indo-Aryan; Northwestern; Punjabi; Eastern Punjabi; Doabi

Language codes
- ISO 639-3: –
- Glottolog: doab1238
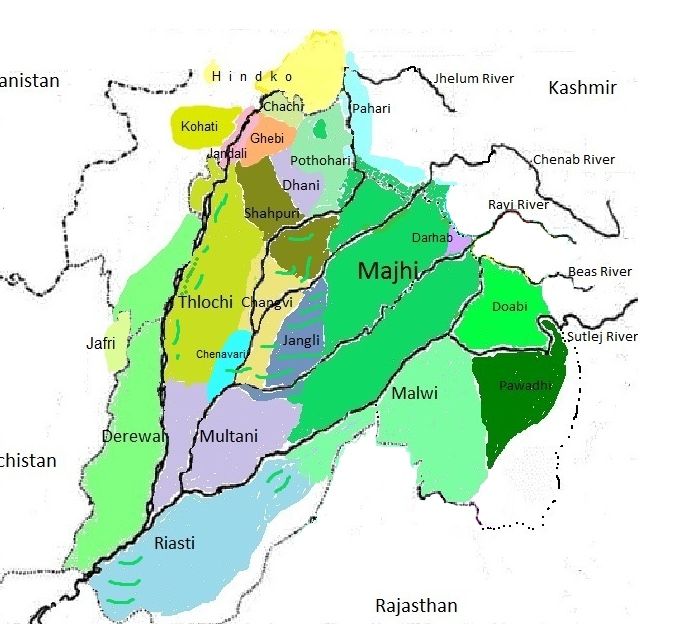
- Doabi in lime

Doabi (Standard: [doːaːˈbi]. Doabi: [dʊʋaːˈbi]), also known as Bist Doabi or Jalandhari, is an eastern dialect of the Punjabi language. The dialect is named after the region in which it originated, Doaba or Bist Doab, between the Beas and Sutlej. Its occurrence in parts of Pakistani Punjab owes to post-1947 migration of Punjabi Muslim populace from East Punjab. The region it is now spoken includes: the Jalandhar, Hoshiarpur, Kapurthala and Nawanshahr districts of Punjab and in lower parts of Una district of Himachal Pradesh.

The sub dialects of Doabi include Dona and Manjki.

== History ==
During the British colonial period, Doabi was spoken in the Jalandhar and Hoshiarpur districts of the Jalandhar division. Doabi was also spoken in parts of Kapurthala State, such as at Kapurthala. Since the 1947 partition, Majhi speakers (such as from Sialkot and Lahore) have settled in the cities of Jalandhar, Nakodar, Kartarpur, and Kapurthala leading to influences on the local Doabi spoken there.

== Phonology ==
=== Consonants ===
Consonantal Inventory of Punjabi
| | | Labial | Dental/Alveolar | Postalveolar | Retroflex | Velar | Glottal |
|---|---|---|---|---|---|---|---|
| Plosive/Affricate | Tenuis | p | t̪ | t͡ʃ | ʈ | k | |
| Plosive/Affricate | Aspirated | pʰ* | t̪ʰ | t͡ʃʰ* | ʈʰ | kʰ | |
| Plosive/Affricate | Voiced | b | d | d͡ʒ* | ɖ | g | |
| Fricative | | f | s*, z* | ʃ | | x* | |
| Approximant | | ʋ | | j* | | ɣ* | ɦ |
| Nasal | | m | n | | ɳ* | | |
| Lateral | | | l | | ɭ* | | |
| Tap/Flap | | | ɾ | | ɽ | | |

Spirantisation of /pʰ/ and /t͡ʃʰ/ is quite common in Punjabi, but this is less apparent in Doaba. Similarly, other Persian-borrowed phonemes are also pronounced in a more indigenous manner. /z, x, ɣ,/ are pronounced /d͡ʒ ,kʰ, g/ respectively. Another surprising aspect is that /j/ is almost always pronounced as /d͡ʒ/.

Debuccalisation of /s/, to /ɦ/ in between vowels also occurs.

Among youngsters, /ɳ/ and /ɭ/ are often replaced with /n/ and /l/. Though, some will replace all instances of alveolar /n/ and /l/ with retroflex /ɳ/ and /ɭ/ as a form of hypercorrection.

Consonants /ɳ/ and /ɭ/ are often realised as nasal and lateral flaps respectively.

Doabi's fortition /ʋ/ at the start of a stressed syllable to [b] as in /'ʋə̀ɖ:a:/ (big) to ['bə̀ɖ:a:].

Doabis often substitute /z/ with /d͡ʒ/, especially in uneducated speech.

Also, the vowel /ʊ/ is pronounced [o]. Accordingly, /'kʰʊʃ/ (happy) becomes ['kʰoʃ] or /'kʊʈ/ (to beat - noun form) becomes ['koʈ]. In Doabi, any word beginning with stressed /ɪ/ is pronounced [e]. For example, the word /'kʰɪt͡ʃ/ (to pull - noun form) is pronounced as ['kʰet͡ʃ] or the word /'ʋɪt͡ʃ/ (in [something]) is pronounced as ['bet͡ʃ]. Similarly, /ʋ/ can be realised as [o] in certain environments, such as in /'kʰʋa:b/ (dream) to ['kʰoa:b].

The Doabi dialect in its eastern part blends with the Malwai dialect of Ludhiana District, and in its Northern side, it shares the linguistic features of Pahari.

| Consonant | Doabi word | English translation |
|---|---|---|
| p ⟨ਪ/پ⟩ | /pəl/ | ‘moment’ (ਪਲ/پل) |
| pʰ ⟨ਫ/پھ⟩ | /pʰəl/ | ‘fruit’ (ਫਲ/پھل) |
| b ⟨ਬ/ب⟩ | /baːləɳ / | ‘firewood’(ਬਾਲਣ/بالݨ) |
| t̪ ⟨ਤ/ت⟩ | /taːɾ/ | ‘wire’ (ਤਾਰ/تار) |
| t̪ʰ ⟨ਥ/تھ⟩ | /tʰaːl/ | ‘round tray’(ਥਾਲ/تھال) |
| d̪ ⟨ਦ/د⟩ | /daːl/ | ‘pulse’ (ਦਾਲ/دال) |
| ʈ ⟨ਟ/ٹ⟩ | /ʈaːl/ | ‘pile’ (ਟਾਲ/ٹال) |
| ʈʰ ⟨ਠ/ٹھ⟩ | /ʈʰiːk/ | ‘correct’ (ਠੀਕ/ٹھیک) |
| ɖ ⟨ਡ/ڈ⟩ | /ɖaːk/ | ‘mail’ (ਡਾਕ/ڈاک) |
| t͡ʃʰ ⟨ਛ/چھ⟩ | /t͡ʃʰa:p/ | ‘imprint’ (ਛਾਪ/چھپ) |
| d͡ʒ ⟨ਜ/ج⟩ | /d͡ʒoːk/ | leech (ਜੋਕ/جوک) |
| k ⟨ਕ/ک⟩ | /kaːɡ/ | ‘crow’ (ਕਾਗ/کاگ) |
| kʰ ⟨ਖ/کھ⟩ | /kʰoːl/ | ‘open’ (ਖੋਲ/کھول) |
| ɡ ⟨ਗ/گ⟩ | /ɡaːɭ/ | ‘abuse’ (ਗਾਲ਼/گالؕ) |
| m ⟨ਮ/م⟩ | /moːɾ/ | ‘peacock’ (ਮੋਰ/مور) |
| n ⟨ਬ/ن⟩ | /nəɾ/ | ‘male’ (ਬੰਦਾ/نر) |
| ɳ* ⟨ਣ/ݨ⟩ | /ɦoɳ / | ‘now’ (ਹੁਣ/ہݨ) |
| l ⟨ਲ/ل⟩ | /laːl/ | ‘red’ (ਰੱਤਾ/رتہ) |
| ɭ* ⟨ਲ਼/لؕ⟩ | /koːɭ / | ‘near’ (ਕੋਲ਼/کولؕ) |
| (s ⟨ਸ/س⟩) | /soɳ / | ‘hear’ (ਸੁਣ/سݨ) |
| (ʃ ⟨ਸ਼/ش⟩) | /ʃeːɾ/ | ‘lion’ (ਸ਼ੇਰ/شیر) |
| (z ⟨ਜ਼/ز⟩) | /zoːɾ/ | ‘strength’ (ਜ਼ੋਰ/زور) |
| (f ⟨ਫ਼/ف⟩) | /fa:sla:/ | ‘distance’ (ਫ਼ਾਸਲਾ/فاصلہ) |
| ɦ ⟨ਹ/ح/ہ⟩ | /ɦoːɾ/ | ‘more’ (ਹੋਰ/ہور) |
| ɾ ⟨ਰ/ر⟩ | /ɾoːɡ/ | ‘disease’ (ਰੋਗ/روگ) |
| ɽ* ⟨ੜ/ڑ⟩ | /piːɽ/ | ‘pain’ (ਪੀੜ/پِیڑ) |

* does not occur word initially

=== Vowels ===
| | Front | | Center | Back | |
| | Long | Short | Center | Long | Short |
|---|---|---|---|---|---|
| Close | iː | ɪ | | uː | ʊ |
| Mid-close | eː | | | oː | |
| Mid-open | ɛː | | ə | ɔː | |
| Open | | | aː | | |

Doabi has ten vowels. These are /ə, ɪ, ʊ, aː, ɛː, eː, iː, ɔː, oː, uː/

Nasalisation in Punjabi is phonemic too, with nasal equivalents of all peripheral vowels vowels.

For example:

| Vowel | Word | Translation |
|---|---|---|
| /ə/ ਅ | ਅੱਖ /əkʰ.kʰ/ | 'eye' |
| /ʊ/ ਉ | ਉਠ /oʈʰ/ | ‘awake’ |
| /ɪ/ ਇ | ਇੱਟ /eʈ:/ | ‘brick’ |
| /aː/ ਆ | ਆਸ /aːs/ | ‘hope’ |
| /ɛː/ ਐ | ਐਨਕ /ɛːnək/ | spectacles’ |
| /uː/ ਊ | ਊਠ /uːʈʰ/ | ‘camel’ |
| /eː/ ਏ | ਸ਼ੇਰ /ʃeːɾ/ | ‘lion’ |
| /oː/ ਓ | ਮੋਰ /moːɾ/ | ‘peacock’ |
| /ɔː/ ਔ | /ɦɔːl/ | ‘fear’ |
| /iː/ ਈ | ਤੀਰ /tiːɾ/ | ‘arrow’ |

One of the most distinctive features of Doabi is how its short close vowels are pronounced. Phonemically, they are:

- /ʊ/
- /ɪ/

But are phonetically:

- [o]
- [e]

=== Tone ===
Three tones are used in Doabi: low, mid and high. For example;

| Tone | Doabi word | English translation |
|---|---|---|
| Falling | ਭਾ pà | ‘rate’ |
| Neutral | ਪਾ pa | ‘put’ |
| Rising | ਪਾਹ pá | ‘harsh’ |

This tonogenesis occurred from the historic loss of breathy voiced consonants. Word-initially, they became voiceless plosives, but remained voiced word-medially and finally. This loss of phonemes led to tone to distinguish between similar morphemes.

When the consonant (that was breathy-voiced) is word initial, the vowel that follows has a falling tone. When the consonant is medial or word-final, it has a rising tone.

Loss of word-final /ɦ/ also led to a rising tone in the preceding vowel.

Stress, however can change what tone on what syllable is present.

=== Stress ===
Stress in Doabi is realized in two ways, syntagmatically and paradigmatically.

Syntagmatically, stress-shift results in change of meaning. This kind of stress is often orthographically unmarked, and may shift any tone present in a word to the stressed syllable.

For example:

| Doabi word | English translation |
|---|---|
| ਘੜਾ /'kə̀ɽa:/ | ‘pitcher’ |
| ਘੜਾ /kə'ɽà:/ | ‘to shape, sculpt, mold’ |

Paradigmatically, Doabi has stressed and unstressed syllables;

| Unstressed | Doabi word | English translation |
|---|---|---|
| s | satt | ‘essence’ |
| | sirnawa | ‘address’ |

| Stressed | Doabi word | English translation |
|---|---|---|
| s | sat | ‘seven’ |
| tt | patta | ‘leaf’ |

== Grammar ==
=== Sentence structure ===
Doabi's end sentences with "aa" (present tense) and "sigey" (past —tense), instead of "han" (present tense) and "san" or "si" (past tense). "Aiddan", "Jiddan", "Kiddan" are all commonly used adverbs in Doabi as opposed to the "Aistaran/Enj," "Jistaran/Jivven," and "Kistaran/Kivven," used in Punjabi's prestige dialect, Majhi.

Present Tense: Usage of aa (sing.) and aa (plu.)

Examples:

| Phrase | Doabi | Standard Punjabi |
| He is doing | Oh kardā ā ਉਹ ਕਰਦਾ ਆ اوہ کردا آ | Oh kardā ɛ̀/e* ਉਹ ਕਰਦਾ ਹੈ/ਏ* اوہ کردا ہے/اے |
| They are doing | Oh karde (y)ā ਉਹ ਕਰਦੇ ਆ اوہ کردے آ | Oh karde han ਉਹ ਕਰਦੇ ਹਨ اوہ کردے ہِن |
| | *spoken forms | |

Past Tense: Uninflected sī, or number- and gender-inflected sīgā/sīgī/sīge/sīgīā, in Doabi

Examples:

| Phrase | Doabi | Standard Punjabi |
| He was doing | oh kardā sī/sīgā ਉਹ ਕਰਦਾ ਸੀ/ਸੀਗਾ اوہ کردا سی/سیگا | oh kardā sī ਉਹ ਕਰਦਾ ਸੀ اوہ کردا سی |
| They were doing | oh karde sī/sīge ਉਹ ਕਰਦੇ ਸੀ /ਸੀਗੇ اوہ کردے سی/سیگے | oh karde san ਉਹ ਕਰਦੇ ਸਨ (also ਸਣ in spoken Majhi) اوہ کردے سن |
| You (sing. m.) were doing | tũ kardā sī/sīgā ਤੂੰ ਕਰਦਾ ਸੀ/ਸੀਗਾ توں کردا سی/سیگا | tũ kardā sɛ̃ ਤੂੰ ਕਰਦਾ ਸੈਂ توں کردا سیں |
| You (pl.) were doing | tusī̃ karde sī/sīge ਤੁਸੀਂ ਕਰਦੇ ਸੀ/ਸੀਗੇ تسی کردے سی/سیگے | tusī̃ karde so ਤੁਸੀਂ ਕਰਦੇ ਸੋ تسی کردے سو |
| I (m.) was doing | mɛ̃ kardā sī/sīgā ਮੈਂ ਕਰਦਾ ਸੀ/ਸੀਗਾ میں کردا سی/سیگا | mɛ̃ kardā sã ਮੈਂ ਕਰਦਾ ਸਾਂ میں کردا ساں |
| We were doing | āppā karde sī/sīge ਆਪਾਂ ਕਰਦੇ ਸੀ/ਸੀਗੇ آپاں کردے سی/سیگے | asī̃ karde sã ਅਸੀਂ ਕਰਦੇ ਸਾਂ اسیں کردےساں |

== Vocabulary ==
| Doabi | English | Standard Punjabi |
|---|---|---|
| ਹੋਊਗਾ "hōūgā" | Will Happen | "hōvēgā" |
| "bāɽa" | Cow shed | "havelī" |
| ਧੌਣ "dhauṇ" | Neck | "gardan" |
| "pāḷā " | Cold | "thand" |
| "kunjī" | Key | "chābbī" |
| "gaṭhe" | Onions | "ganḍē" |
| "niāṇe" | Children | "bacche" |
| "Dekhṇa" | To See | "Vekhṇā" |
| "kardā sī | To Be Doing | "kar ría ɛ̀" |
| "gábbe" | Middle | "vichkār" |
| "līre/talle" | Clothes | "kappaṛe" |
| "lītā" | Bought | "Leyayea" |

=== Some basic vocabulary items ===
| Doabi word | English translation |
|---|---|
| ਪੇਅ /peːə/ | ‘father’ |
| ਭੈਣ /pɛːɳ/ | ‘sister’ |
| ਭਰਾ /pəɾɑː/ | ‘brother’ |
| ਸੇਂਅ /sẽə/ | ‘apple’ |
| ਝੋੱਨਾ /t͡ʃoːn.nɑː/ | ‘paddy’ |
| ਬੱਡਾ /bəɖ.ɖɑː/ | ‘elder’ |

== Orthography ==
Doabi uses the Gurmukhi script.

Tone that occurs from the loss of breathy voiced consonants is shown through the following characters in orthography:

- ਘ
- ਝ
- ਢ
- ਧ
- ਭ
- ੜ੍ਹ

== See also ==
- Languages of Pakistan
- Languages of India
- List of Indian languages by total speakers
- Malwi dialect
- Puadhi dialect
- Omission of word-final shwa in Indo-Aryan languages
