= Kali Charan Bahl =

Indian linguist

Kali Charan Bahl is an associate professor emeritus in two departments: South Asian Languages and Civilizations and Linguistics at the University of Chicago. He specialized in Hindi and related languages or dialects.

Bahl has published more than half a dozen books, in both Hindi and English, about the grammar, semantics, and dialectology of Hindi. He also did research in the 1960s on Korwa, a Munda language.

Upon retirement, he made a large donation of his personal collection of books and documents to Regenstein Library.

== Works ==
- Norman H. Zide, Colin P. Masica, Kalicharan Bahl and Anoop C. Chandola, Editors. A Premchand Reader. Honolulu: East-West Center Press. 1962.
- 1963. Korwa Vocabulary. Mimeo., Chicago.
- Reference grammar of Hindi (a study of some selected topics in Hindi grammar, 1967
- On the present state of modern Rajasthani grammar, Rājasthānī Sódha Saṃsthāna, 1972
- Ādhunika Rājasthānī kā saṃracanātmaka vyākaraṇa, Rājasthānī Śodha Saṃsthāna, 1980
- Studies in the semantic structure of Hindi: synonymous nouns and adjectives with karana, Motilal Banarsidass, 1974
- Study in the transformational analysis of the Hindi verb, 196u.
- The concept of person as a relational category in Modern Standard Hindi and interpersonal speech-behavior on the parts of its partakers, University of Chicago, 2007.
