= Sardar Mohammad Khan =

Pakistani researcher of linguistics

Sardar Muhammad Khan

Sardar Mohammad Khan (1 January 1915 – 26 May 1998), also known by the abbreviation SMK, was a Pakistani researcher of linguistics. He attempted to standardize the Punjabi language in Pakistan. He was against what he perceived to be Sikh linguistic hegemony over the Punjabi language and therefore he rejected Gurmukhi and Sanskrit/Hindi-borrowings in regards to Pakistani Punjabi and instead advocated for the Perso-Arabic script. He was also against what he perceived to be the Urduization of Punjabi.

== Early life ==
He was born into a family of Pathan descent at Basti Danishmandan, Jalandhar. After doing his secondary and higher secondary education, he received his B.A. degree from the University of the Punjab, Lahore in 1934. He joined united Indian Army as a civilian employee and retired as a civilian gazetted officer from the Pakistan Army General Headquarters (GHQ), Rawalpindi in 1969. Being a government servant, under the rules, he could not publish any book until his retirement.

== Work ==
Sardar Muhammad Khan gave fifty years of his life to writing the largest Punjabi-Urdu dictionary in the history of the Punjabi language. This dictionary, which has been published by the Pakistan Academy of Letters along with Punjabi Adabi Board in 2009, consists of two volumes of more than 3,500 pages each. He advocated for the development of a Pakistani Standard Punjabi based upon the Lahndi variety spoken in Warzirabad and written in Perso-Arabic script.

It has been written with a scholarly approach, and besides giving meanings and explanations of Punjabi words in Urdu, it also explains idioms, riddles, children's games, traditions, customs and religious terms. His love for dictionaries was evident from the fact that he remembered all the contents of Oxford Dictionary. He said, "it is the spelling that makes a dictionary: the pronunciation can differ from Peshawar to Sindh, but once you agree on a spelling, one word shall suffice for all". This Punjabi-Urdu dictionary has been proven to be the most detailed and authoritative on the subject as of 2015.

Khan could write and speak in Arabic, English, Urdu and Persian fluently. He had also thoroughly studied the Quran and Islam.

He also wrote a specialised book on phonetics, Aswatiat in Urdu. It was printed in a small press that he himself ran.

His love for songs that brought him into the subjects of sounds/phonetics and dialects, and formed the basis of his philological research in literature. This love also made him a scholar of music and he learned to sing 'raags' (a kind of music) and play the sitar.

He had a passion for working on his family history. He worked to give details of his ancestors' migration from one place to another with genealogy of the family of the past three hundred years.

== Bibliography ==
- Kuliatee Aswaatiaat (1972)
- Zabanain aur Rasm-ul-Khat (1972)
- Punjabi Zaban aur is ki Boliaan
- Kashmiri Zaban ka Qaeda
- Gurmukhi Lipi
- Punjabi Ucharan Dictionary
- Tazkara-tul-Ansaar (Urdu translation)

== Death ==
Khan died on May 26, 1998.
