= Majhail =

People from Majha, Punjab

Majhail (Note: Punjabi: مجھیل (Shahmukhi), ਮਝੈਲ (Gurmukhi)) (Punjabi pronunciation: [məˈdʒ(ʱ)eːl]) is a term applied as a demonym for a subgroup of Punjabi people from the Majha region of Punjab — split between Pakistan and India. They natively speak the Majhi dialect of Punjabi.
