= Punjabi nationalism =

Ethnonationalist ideology

Punjab, with its colonial era borders, within the modern subcontinent

Punjabi nationalism (Note: Western Punjabi: پنجابی قوم پرستی, romanized: Panjābī qaum-parastī Eastern Punjabi: ਪੰਜਾਬੀ ਰਾਸ਼ਟਰਵਾਦ, romanized: Panjābī rāśaṭaravāda) is an ethnonationalist ideology that focuses on Punjabis as a single nation, emphasising their cultural, social and political unity (Punjabiyat) around the world, especially in their native Punjab — split between Pakistan and India. Its demands range from cultural and political rights to greater autonomy or an independent state. (Note: Sources:)

With its origins in post-Mughal Punjab, early forms of Punjabi nationalism spurred the coalescence of Punjabis into a broader common "Punjabi" national identity in the wake of Afghan and Maratha invasions of Punjab. Various independent Punjabi states arose during the Mughal decline, including several Muslim states (most notably Bahawalpur, Pakpattan, Pothohar, Sial State) and twelve Sikh Misls.

Punjabi nationalism arose as a prominent ideology during the process of Punjabi Unification initiated by Ranjit Singh under which foreign powers such as the Durrani Empire were forced to retreat from Punjab. As Maharaja of Punjab, Ranjit Singh established an inclusive and secular Punjabi state under the Sikh Empire. During the British colonial era, Punjabi nationalism was largely driven by the Unionist Party, and other Punjab-based anti-colonial movements.

Punjabi nationalism — closely linked with Sikh nationalism in India — arose under the Singh Sabha Movement to protect the Punjabi language and Gurmukhi script, due to the advent of the notion of Hindi and Devanagari's association with Hindu nationalism, with the Arya Samaj advocating for the use of Devanagari. Following the partition of Punjab in 1947, the prior Sikh movement culminated in the Punjabi Suba movement in East Punjab where Sikhs who mostly identified Punjabi as their mother tongue — with Hindus identifying with Hindi in the census — demanded a separate state leading to the trifurcation of East Punjab on a linguistic basis in 1966 and the formation of the sole Sikh-majority and Punjabi state in India. The Shiromani Gurdwara Parbandhak Committee had declared the Punjab region as the natural homeland of Sikhs in 1946; with the Anandpur Sahib Resolution of 1973 also linking Sikhism to Punjab as a Sikh homeland. During the Khalistan movement, Sikh militants enforced the Punjabi language, the Gurmukhi script, and traditional Punjabi clothing in Punjab. (Note: Sources:)

In Pakistan, Punjabi nationalism emerged in the 1980s as a reaction to the Saraiki movement, a political movement which sought to separate the southern Punjabi dialects from the Punjabi language, and to instead declare them to constitute a separate language for which the term Saraiki was adopted — separating erstwhile southern Punjabis from their Punjabi ethnic identity and subsequently giving rise to the Saraikistan province movement. Punjabi intellectuals considered the Saraiki movement as "an attack on Punjabi"; with Punjabi nationalists, and by extension many Punjabis, still refusing to recognise Saraiki as a separate language, citing its linguistic status as a variety of Punjabi. The Punjabi Language Movement, driven by Punjabiyat and Punjabi nationalism, demands official recognition of the Punjabi language in Pakistan.

The goals of Punjabi nationalist movement are widespread, but the promotion Punjabi culture, language and unity is common to all. Supporters in the Punjabi diaspora also focus on the promotion of a shared ethnocultural heritage.

== Pre-colonial history ==
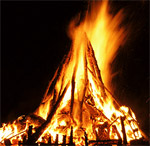
Lohri Bonfire, it is celebrated in the wider Punjab region in remembrance of Dulla Bhatti

The coalescence of the various tribes, castes and the inhabitants of the Punjab region into a broader common "Punjabi" identity initiated from the onset of the 18th century CE. Historically, the Punjabi people were a heterogeneous group and were subdivided into a number of clans called biradari (literally meaning "brotherhood") or tribes, with each person bound to a clan. With the passage of time, tribal structures became replaced with a more cohesive and holistic society, as community building and group cohesiveness form the new pillars of Punjabi society.

The Punjab region's history of warfare and foreign invasions has contributed to a culture of engaging in warfare to protect the land. During the Mughal rule, Dulla Bhatti, a Punjabi folk hero led the Punjabis to a revolt against Mughal rule during the reign of the Mughal emperor Akbar. He is entirely absent from the recorded history of the time, and the only evidence of his existence comes from Punjabi folklore, and took the form of social banditry. According to Ishwar Dayal Gaur, although he was "the trendsetter in peasant insurgency in medieval Punjab", he remains "on the periphery of Punjab's historiography".

Both his father, Farid, and his grandfather, variously called Bijli or Sandal, (Note: Surinder Singh's analysis of regional folklore names Bhatti's grandfather as Sandal and suggests the possibility, given the influence that he had in the region, that the area of Sandal Bar is named after him.) were executed for opposing the new and centralised land revenue collection scheme imposed by the Mughal emperor Akbar.

His general anti-authoritarian, rebellious nature is described to "crystallise" with the Akbar regime as its target, although not as a means of revenge specifically for the deaths of his relatives but in the wider sense of the sacrifices made by rural people generally. Bhatti saw this, says Gaur, as a "peasant class war". Bhatti's class war took the form of social banditry, taking from the rich and giving to the poor. (Note: Social bandit is a concept devised by Eric Hobsbawm, defined as "peasant outlaws whom the lord and state regard as criminals, but who remain within peasant society, and are considered by their people as heroes, as champions.") Folklore gave him a legendary status for preventing girls from being abducted and sold as slaves.

His efforts may have influenced Akbar's decision to pacify Guru Arjan Dev Ji, and through Guru Arjan Dev Ji's influence the people of Bari Doab, by exempting the area from the requirement to provide land revenues.

The end for Bhatti came in 1599 when he was hanged in Lahore. Shah Hussain, a contemporary Sufi poet who wrote of him, recorded his last words as being "No honourable son of Punjab will ever sell the soil of Punjab". The memory of Bhatti as a saviour of Punjabi girls is recalled at the annual Lohri celebrations in the region to this day, although those celebrations also incorporate many other symbolic strands.

During the rule of the Mughal Empire in India, two Sikh gurus were martyred. (Guru Arjan was martyred on suspicion of helping in betrayal of Mughal Emperor Jahangir and Guru Tegh Bahadur was martyred by the Mughal Emperor Aurangzeb) As the Sikh faith grew, the Sikhs subsequently militarized to oppose Mughal rule.

In the late 18th century, during frequent invasions of the Durrani Empire, the Sikh Misls were in close combat with the Durrani Empire, but they began to gain territory with the capture of Lahore, by Ranjit Singh, from its Afghan ruler, Zaman Shah Durrani, and the subsequent and progressive expulsion of Afghans from the Punjab, by capitalizing off Afghan decline in the Afghan-Sikh Wars, and the unification of the separate Sikh misls. Ranjit Singh was proclaimed as Maharaja of the Punjab on 12 April 1801 (to coincide with Vaisakhi), creating a unified political state.

Despite the religious diversity of the Sikh Empire, the people of Punjab were united by a shared identity as Punjabis and a growing sense of Punjabi nationalism.

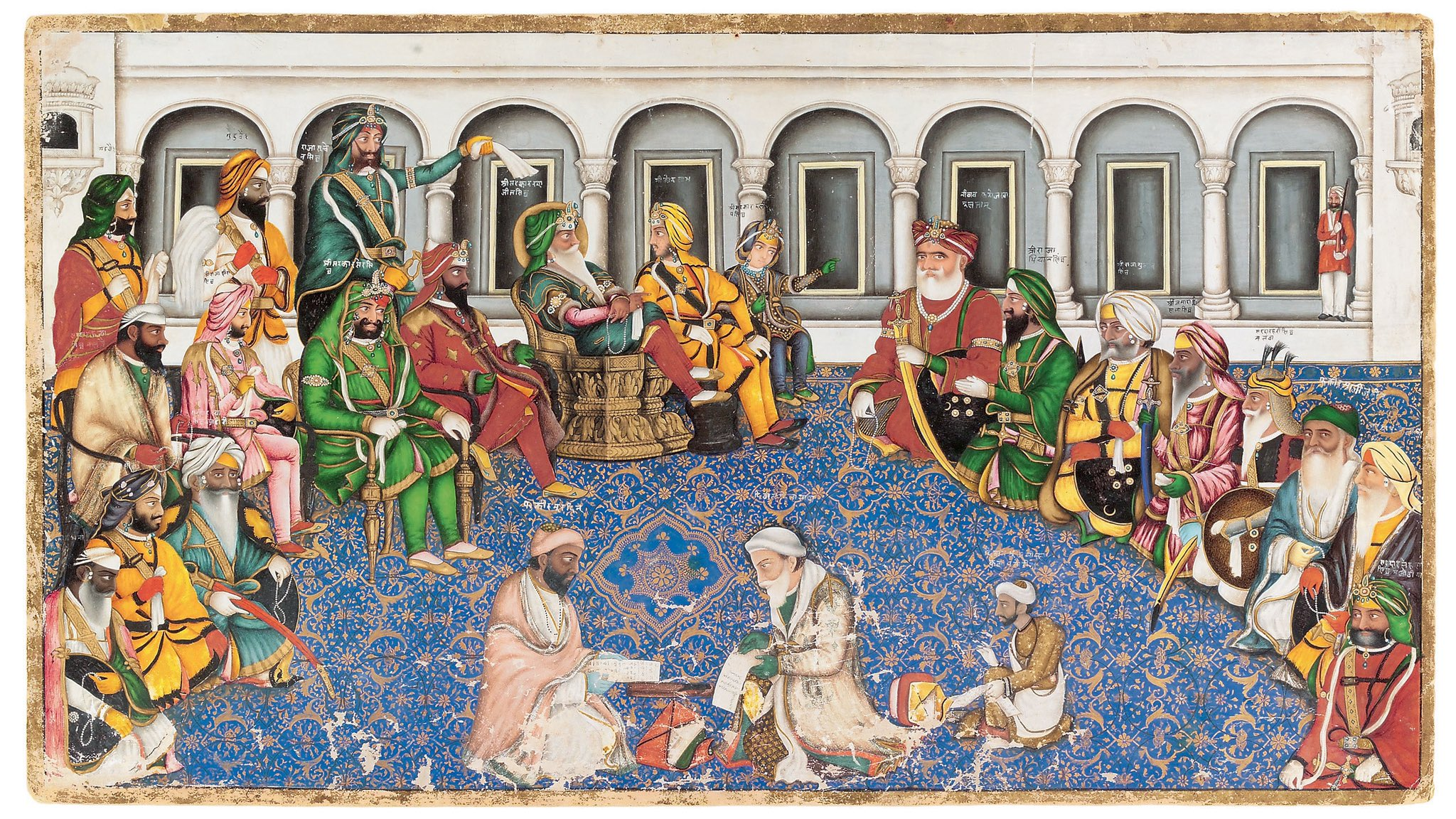
Punjabis of Sikh, Muslim and Hindu backgrounds gather together at the court of Maharaja Ranjit Singh. c.1850

In her 2022-book Muslims under Sikh Rule in the Nineteenth Century, Dr. Robina Yasmin, a Pakistani historian who teaches at the Islamia University Bahawalpur, tries to give a balanced picture of Ranjit Singh, between the contradictory images of "a great secular ruler" and that of "an extremist Sikh who was bent upon eliminating Islam in the Punjab", Dr. Robina Yasmin's own assessment after her study being that Ranjit Singh himself was tolerant and secular and that the mistreatment of the Muslim population often ascribed to him based on dubious anecdotes in fact came from his subordinates.

This sense of identity was bolstered by the secular rule of Maharaja Ranjit Singh, a Sikh Punjabi who had successfully expelled the Afghan invaders from Punjab and established a powerful Sikh kingdom in the region. As a result, Punjab was a secular nation with a strong sense of Punjabi nationalism.

== During British colonial rule ==
After the death of Maharaja Ranjit Singh, the empire weakened due to significant internal divisions and political mismanagement, factors that were further influenced by the policies of the British East India Company, the state was ultimately annexed following its defeat in the Second Anglo-Sikh War.

During the British Raj, Punjabis made up the third largest ethno-linguistic group in South Asia, and the region held strategic importance as a frontier province of British India. Consequently, colonial administration placed significant importance on maintaining stability within Punjab and its population.

The British imposed martial law in Punjab to govern the State and to control the rising sentiment of Punjabi nationalism, and implemented policies that eventually contributed to social identities shifting from the broader regional or cultural identity toward religious distinctions among Muslims, Hindus, and Sikhs.

British authorities often restricted the use of Punjabi in education and administration. Instead, Urdu was promoted by the British as an official language in Punjab. These developments contributed to sociopolitical changes within Punjabi society, including reconsideration of their language and identity.

During this period, sections of the Hindu Punjabi population largely started associating themselves with Hindi, while many Muslim Punjabis aligned with Urdu. This linguistic difference further reinforced religious identities over the shared regional ones. Over time, these processes contributed to broader communal differences within the subcontinent, culminating in the Partition of India, which divided Punjab between the newly formed states of India and Pakistan.

== Post-Partition ==
=== Pakistan ===
Punjabi nationalism in Pakistan largely emerged in the 1980s due to the emergence of the Saraiki language movement that looked to separate the Saraiki-speaking areas of the Punjab from the rest of the province. Alyssa Ayres, a cultural historian, suggests that many Punjabi intellectuals considered the Saraiki movement as "yet another attack on Punjabi." Punjabi nationalists accuse the elite sections made up of fellow Punjabis of neglecting the Punjabi language and forgetting the Punjabi culture to maintain their personal influence and power. Punjabi nationalism is a more recent phenomenon, and compared to other ethno-nationalisms in Pakistan, it is often overlooked due to the dominance of the Punjabi ethnic group in the country.

In August 2015, the Pakistan Academy of Letters, International Writer's Council (IWC) and World Punjabi Congress (WPC) organised the Khawaja Farid Conference and demanded that a Punjabi-language university should be established in Lahore and that Punjabi language should be declared as the medium of instruction at the primary level. In September 2015, a case was filed in Supreme Court of Pakistan against Government of Punjab, Pakistan as it did not take any step to implement the Punjabi language in the province. Additionally, several thousand Punjabis gather in Lahore every year on International Mother Language Day.

=== India ===
The Punjabi Suba movement was a long-drawn political agitation, launched by Punjabi speaking people (mostly Sikhs) demanding the creation of autonomous Punjabi Suba, or Punjabi-speaking state, in the post-independence Indian state of East Punjab. The movement is defined as the forerunner of Khalistan movement.

Borrowing from the pre-partition demands for a Sikh country, this movement demanded a fundamental constitutional autonomous state within India. Led by the Akali Dal, it resulted in the formation of the state of Punjab. The state of Haryana and the Union Territory of Chandigarh were also created and some Pahari-majority parts of the East Punjab were also merged with Himachal Pradesh following the movement. The result of the movement failed to satisfy its leaders.

From 1938 to 1947, Akali Dal led by Master Tara Singh proposed the whole Punjab region (Azad Punjab) as the ‘natural homeland’ of the Sikhs. This demand was raised throughout this period along with the 1946 SGPC resolution declaring the Punjab as homeland of the Sikhs. The image of Punjab region as an independent Sikh Homeland continues to exist in sections of the Sikh, particularly being advocated by Sikhs in the diaspora post 1947.

== Reunification proposals ==
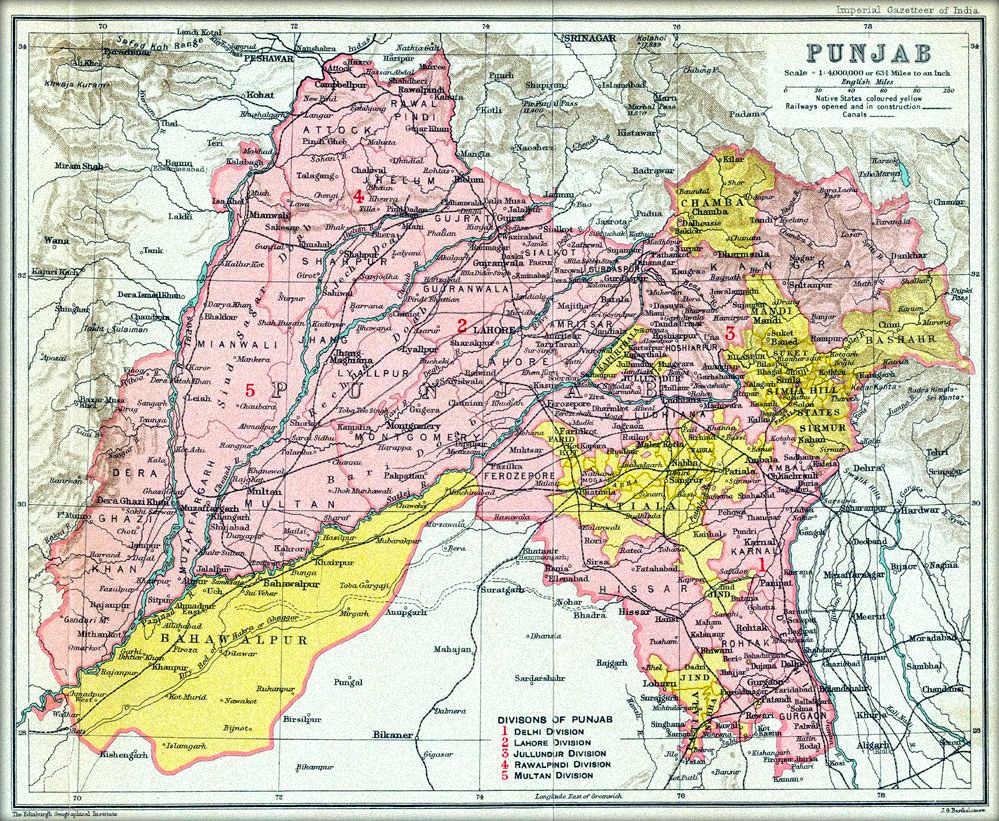
The Punjab Province of British India (1909)

Bhajan Lal proposed the idea of the Punjabi Reunification, in which the modern Indian states of Punjab, Haryana, and Himachal Pradesh would reunify into a single Punjab state within India, with its borders corresponding to the former East Punjab state. The idea of the reunification of these states with the area corresponding to West Punjab has not been one that has been heavily contemplated apart from the context of Indian reunification in general.

== See also ==
- Punjabization
- Punjabi culture
- Punjabi Culture Day
- Punjabi festivals
- Punjabi Language Movement (Pakistan)
- Punjabi Suba movement (India)
- Punjabi Wikipedia
