= Punjabi Language Movement =

Movement for recognition of Punjabi in Pakistan

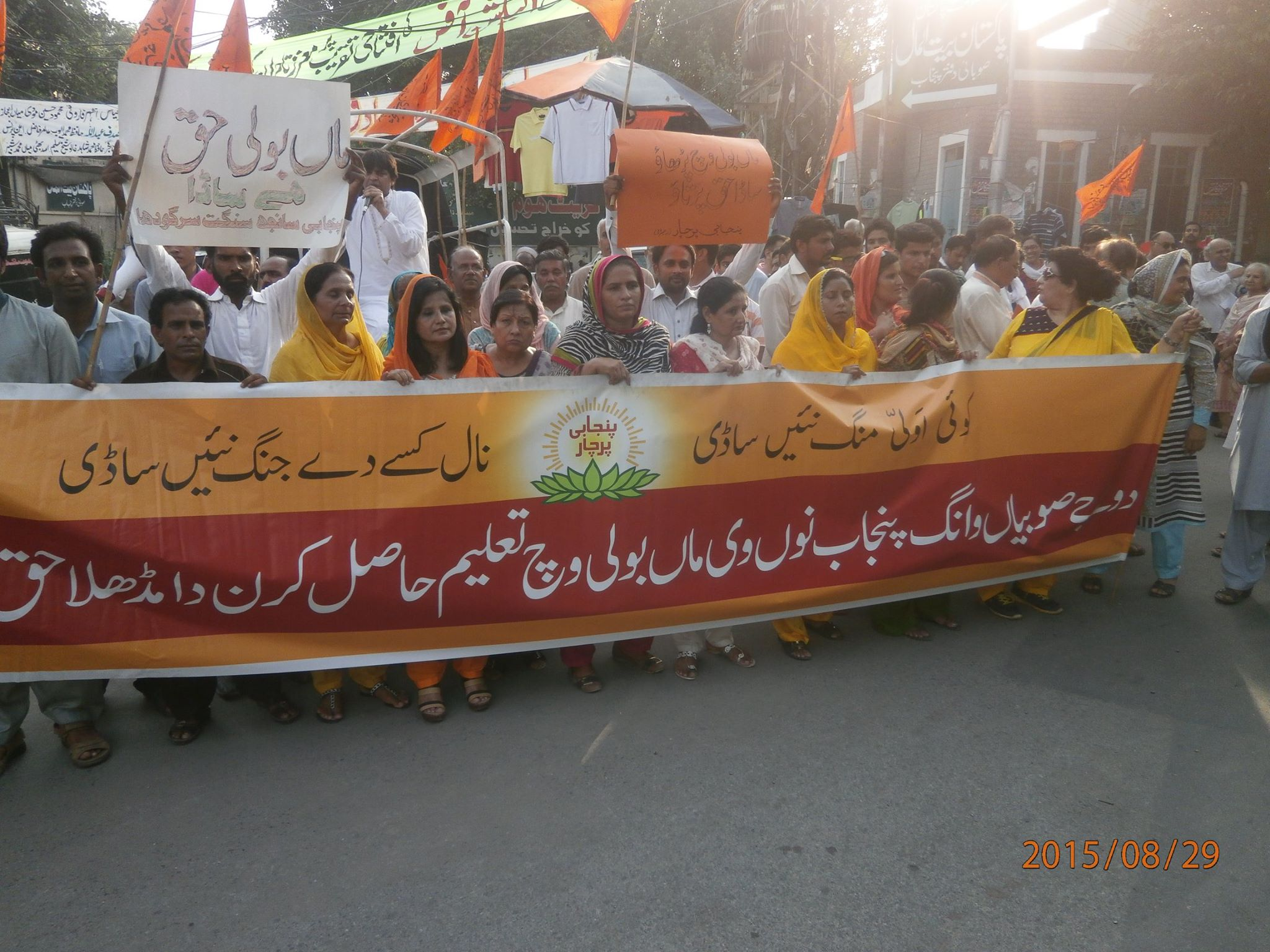
- Public demonstration in Lahore
- Location: Punjab, Pakistan
- Caused by: Marginalisation of Punjabi; Linguistic imposition of Urdu
- Methods: Political demonstration

Parties
Punjabi Parchar; World Punjabi Congress; Punjabi Khoj Garh; Punjabi Lok Sujag	Government of Pakistan; (Punjab, Pakistan) Government of Punjab

The Punjabi Language Movement (Punjabi: پنجابی زبان تحریک, romanized: Pañjābī zabān tahrīk, pronounced [pəɲˈd͡ʒaːbːi zəˈbaːn təɦˈɾik]; abbreviated as PLM) is a socio-political movement in Punjab, Pakistan, advocating the recognition of the Punjabi language, as well as culture and literature, in Pakistan to allow its use in government affairs, education, and media. From the 1960s–1980s, usage of Punjabi in Pakistan was discouraged. Punjabi became relegated to folklore and film whilst Urdu became prevalent in media and bureaucracy. In the 1990s, a grassroots movement began to alter public perception and promote the Punjabi language in the country as a means of reviving Punjabiyat. The decline of Punjabi is especially prevalent in urban areas.

Today, the Punjabi people constitute the largest ethnic group in the country, though Urdu was given status as the sole national language of the country, following independence. Unlike Indian Punjab, where reading and writing the Punjabi language is compulsory at every level from 2008, alongside a special Punjabi University at Patiala, Punjabi does not have any kind of official status in Pakistan and is merely recognised as a nominal "provincial language" in Pakistani Punjab. The PLM's ideologies are based on Punjabi nationalism.

== History ==
For centuries, the Punjabi language was sustained (through music and poetry) in western Punjab via Sufi institutions, known as khanqas, despite Persian being the administrative language for over 800 years. Persian remained the administrative language in Punjab during the rule of the Delhi Sultanates, Mughals, and Sikhs. After the annexation of Punjab by the British in 1849, they adopted Urdu as the province's official language rather than Punjabi. In 1908, Mian Shafi, a Muslim elite, opposed Prof. Mukherjee's comment that Punjabi should become the provincial language of the British province of Punjab, refuting that the language of Muslims was Urdu. Jinnah opposed Motilal Nehru's 1928 proposal that every province should have its own language alongside the Hindustani language as the national language, with Jinnah stating that Urdu was the language of Muslims in a communication to Jawaharlal Nehru. Liaqat Ali Khan opposed a 1937 proposal by Gandhi to deliver free education to children in their mother tongue.

When Pakistan was created in 1947, despite Punjabi being the majority language in West Pakistan and Bengali the majority in East Pakistan and Pakistan as whole, English and Urdu were chosen as the official languages. The selection of Urdu was due to its association with South Asian Muslim nationalism and because the leaders of the new nation wanted a unifying national language instead of promoting one ethnic group's language over another, due to this the Punjabi elites started identifying with Urdu more than Punjabi because they saw it as a unifying force on an ethnoreligious perspective. Broadcasting in Punjabi language by Pakistan Broadcasting Corporation decreased on TV and radio after 1947. Article 251 of the Constitution of Pakistan declares that these two languages would be the only official languages at the national level, while provincial governments would be allowed to make provisions for the use of other languages. However, in the 1950s the constitution was amended to include the Bengali language.

Punjabi is not a language of instruction for primary or secondary school students in Punjab Province (unlike Sindhi and Pashto in other provinces). Pupils in secondary schools can choose the language as an elective, while Punjabi instruction or study remains rare in higher education. One notable example is the teaching of Punjabi language and literature by the University of the Punjab in Lahore which began in 1970 with the establishment of its Punjabi Department.

In the cultural sphere, there are many books, plays, and songs being written or produced in the Punjabi-language in Pakistan. Until the 1970s, there were a large number of Punjabi-language films being produced by the Lollywood film industry, however since then Urdu has become a much more dominant language in film production. Additionally, television channels in Punjab Province (centred on the Lahore area) are broadcast in Urdu. The preeminence of Urdu in both broadcasting and the Lollywood film industry is seen by critics as being detrimental to the health of the language. Zia-ul Haq banned three works promoting the Punjabi language. Until the early 1990s, members of the Punjab Assembly were forbidden to address the house in Punjabi. However, this ban was lifted by Hanif Ramay yet was re-instated shortly after. Media was used for the promotion of Urdu. Local newspapers, such as Jang and Nawaiwaqt, explicitly promoted the usage of Urdu over regional languages in their top-banners. Politicians campaigning in Punjab would favour Urdu as well. In 1989, a public march for the promotion of Punjabi was held from Nasir Bagh to the Punjab Assembly in Lahore. Also in 1989, Ilyas Ghumman founded the Punjabi Science Board to develop Punjabi curricula via the translation of science books and the preservation of vaar works. The Punjabi language revitalization movement slowed in the 1990s. Further developments occurred in 2011, coinciding with International Mother Language Day. In late 2013, the Punjabi Parchar organisation was formed to promote the usage of Punjabi amongst the youth. In 2016, a private school system in Pakistan issued a circular notice to parents, requesting them to not allow their children to use "foul language and Punjabi" in school. This order was legally challenged in the courts by Punjabi language activists, which ruled that no authority has the right to ban the usage of a specific language on threat of penalties for future breaches.

The use of Urdu and English as the near-exclusive languages of broadcasting, the public sector, and formal education have led some to fear that Punjabi in Pakistan is being relegated to a low-status language and that it is being denied an environment where it can flourish. Several prominent educational leaders, researchers, and social commentators have echoed the opinion that the intentional promotion of Urdu and the continued denial of any official sanction or recognition of the Punjabi language amounts to a process of "Urdu-isation" that is detrimental to the health of the Punjabi language In August 2015, the Pakistan Academy of Letters, International Writer's Council (IWC) and World Punjabi Congress (WPC) organised the Khawaja Farid Conference and demanded that a Punjabi-language university should be established in Lahore and that Punjabi language should be declared as the medium of instruction at the primary level. In September 2015, a case was filed in Supreme Court of Pakistan against Government of Punjab, Pakistan as it did not take any step to implement the Punjabi language in the province. Additionally, several thousand Punjabis gather in Lahore every year on International Mother Language Day. Thinktanks, political organisations, cultural projects, and individuals also demand authorities at the national and provincial level to promote the use of the language in the public and official spheres. In 2018, language activists' lobbying led the government to officially mark the 1st of Chet (March 13–14) as Punjabi Culture Day. Due to a petition by language activists, in February 2019 Justice Karim Bakhsh of the Lahore High Court ordered the government to enact legislation making Punjabi a compulsory academic subject.

The proportion of people with Punjabi as their mother tongue in each Pakistani District as of the 2017 Pakistan Census

Despite being the most-widely spoken language in Pakistan, the language is in decline. The Punjabi language's decline in Pakistan has been attributed to various causes, such as lack of official recognition, lack of prestige, promotion of Urdu and English, to dispell fears of Punjabi domination by ethnic minorities, and other factors. The language has been relegated to informal communication, also as a means for crude humour, abuse, and to connect with uneducated masses. Parents who speak Punjabi opt to only communicate to their children in Urdu or English, with Punjabi being seen as paindu (shorthand for "backwardness" or "uneducated"). In June 2024, the Punjab Assembly passed a resolution to allow lawmakers to communicate in Punjabi. In October 2024, the Punjab province's assembly passed a resolution to make Punjabi an official subject across more sectors of the education system as a compulsory subject. In March 2024, Maryam Nawaz announced the introduction of Punjabi as a subject in schools. In November 2025, Maryam Nawaz again pushed for the inclusion of Punjabi language education in Pakistan's educational institutions. Rana Sikandar Hayat, Education Minister of the Punjab, has hinted at the introduction of Punjabi and Shahmukhi into the school education system as part of the official curriculum. Despite announcements and promises by government officials, little action has been taken.

There is currently a Punjabi language revitalisation movement in Pakistan. According to language activist Ahmad Raza Punjabi, out of a total population of 120 million in Pakistani Punjab, less than 10 million persons are active proponents of the Punjabi language. This is an increase in the proportion of the overall population, from 0.1% in past years to around 4-5% of Pakistani Punjabis. In order to increase public acceptance, appeals have been made to the Punjabi language's connection to Sufism and the musical traditions tied to the language, such as Qawwali. Festivals and events promoting the usage of Punjabi include Bulleh Shah Festival, the Punjab Festival, and the International Punjabi Conference.

== See also ==
- Punjabi nationalism
- Punjabi Suba movement
- Punjabiyat
- Anti-Hindi agitation of 1937–40
