= Majhi dialect =

Dialect of Punjabi

Majhi
- Central Punjabi
- ਮਾਝੀ; Mājhī; ماجھی
- Native to: Pakistan, India
- Region: Majha and surrounding areas
- Ethnicity: Punjabis
- Language family: Indo-European: Indo-Iranian; Indo-Aryan; Northwestern; Punjabi; Majhi
- Writing system: Shahmukhi; Gurmukhi

Language codes
- ISO 639-3: –
- Glottolog: majh1252

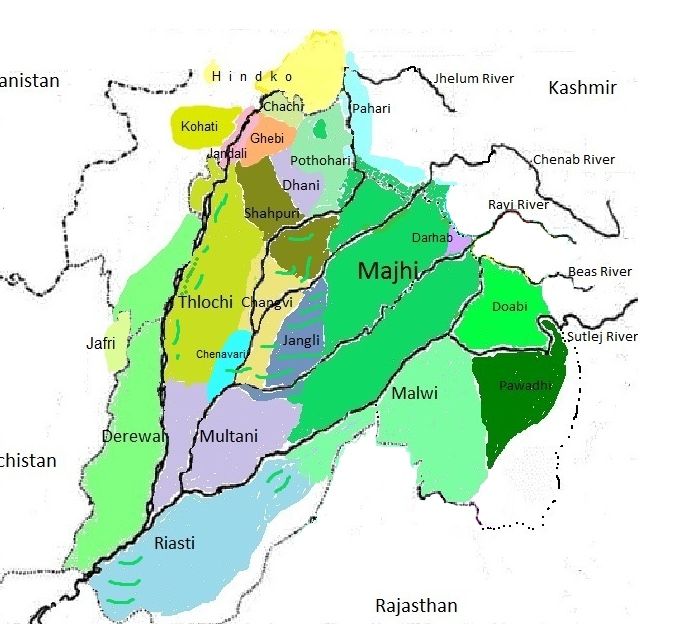
Dialects of Punjabi

Majhi (ماجھی, ਮਾਝੀ, Mājhī, pronounced [mä˩˥d̆.d͡ʒi]), also known as Central Punjabi, (Note: Known in Punjabi as Kendri Punjabi or Markazi Punjabi.) is a dialect of the Punjabi language. It is natively spoken in the Majha region and surrounding areas of Punjab in present-day Pakistan and India. Majhi is transitional between Eastern and Western Punjabi dialects. Bhardwaj (2016) classifies Majhi as an Eastern Punjabi dialect.

The native speakers of the dialect are known by the demonym 'Majhail'.

== History ==
There is a lack of a river boundary between Amritsar and Lahore, leading to the formation of a shared, cultural zone. Later, this area expanded to include the regions of Gujranwala, Sheikhupura, and Sialkot which lay beyond the Ravi river due to Ranjit Singh forming a polity with these core territories. Further consolidation occurred with improved transport infrastructure during colonial-rule, such as the construction of bridges. During British-rule, the Majhi dialect was spoken in the areas under the erstwhile Lahore division and its six constituent districts (Lahore, Amritsar, Gurdaspur, Gujranwala, and Sialkot districts). The Amritsari strand was spoken in parts of the former Kapurthala State. Due to close cultural, economic, and logistic ties during the colonial period, the local lect of Firozpur and Zira were influenced by Mahji despite not being in Majha. After the partition-related migration of Majhi-speaking refugees to various non-Majhi areas, certain cities' local vernaculars have become influenced by Majhi, such as Jalandhar (with refugees settling there from Lahore and Sialkot), Kapurthala, Kartarpur, and Nakodar. Majhi-speaking refugees from Lahore district were also settled in the then Muktsar tehsil, leading to influence on the local language.

== Subdialects and geographic distribution ==
Below is a list of several of the subdialects of Majhi. Due to limited documentation on specific regions, certain varieties and their respective districts have been omitted.

- Central Majhi, spoken in the Gujranwala, Lahore and Sheikhupura districts.
- Northeastern Majhi, spoken in the Amritsar, Gurdaspur, Pathankot, Narowal and Sialkot districts, as well the south of Indian-administered Jammu and Kashmir bordering Pakistan.
- Northwestern Majhi, spoken in the Gujrat and Jhelum districts, as well as southern Bhimber District in Azad Jammu and Kashmir.

Majhi varieties are also spoken natively in the districts of Hafizabad, Kasur, Mandi Bahauddin, Nankana Sahib, Tarn Taran and Wazirabad.

== General features ==
=== Personal pronouns ===
Majhi does not use the second-person oblique pronoun tē̃, and instead uses tū̃.

In urban Majhi, the plural oblique pronouns tusā̃ and asā̃, as well as the ablative pronouns, are sometimes lost.

=== Pronominal suffixes ===
One of Majhi's most noteworthy features is the usage of pronominal suffixes, which it shares with Western Punjabi.

Pronominal suffixes are auxiliary replacements of the copula which act like pronouns. They function as a particular thematic role and agree to it in person and number (as a pronoun would).

The thematic/syntactic roles a pronominal suffix can function as are:

- the direct case subject
- the ergative agent
- the possessive determiner
- the addressee

Majhi uses pronominal suffixes for the second and third persons and for both present and past tense.

Tense	Present		Past	
Person	Singular	Plural	Singular	Plural
2nd	ī ਈ ای	je ਜੇ جے	sāī ਸਾਈ سائی	sāje ਸਾਜੇ ساجے
3rd	sū ਸੂ سُو	ne ਨੇ نے	sāsū ਸਾਸੂ ساسُو	sāne ਸਾਨੇ سانے

Examples in perfect transitive verbs (marking the ergative agent):

Tense	Person	Number	Majhi	Standard Punjabi	Translation
present	2nd	sing.	kī kītā ī?	tē̃ kī kītā hē?	What hast thou done?
present	2nd	pl.	jinnā khādhā je	jinnā tusā̃ khādhā hē	As much as you have eaten
present	3rd	sing.	mēnū̃ suṇāī sū	os ne mēnū̃ suṇāī hē	He/She hath told me
present	3rd	pl.	pāṇī pītā ne	ehnā̃ ne pāṇī pītā hē	They have drunk water
past	2nd	sing.	jēs tarhā̃ ghalliyā̃ sāī	jis tarhā̃ tē̃ ghalliyā̃ san	In the way thou had sent them
past	2nd	pl.	cacer syātā sāje	tusā̃ cacer syātā sī	You had recognised cousin
past	3rd	sing.	aṉḍe nū̃ riddhe sāsū?	es ne aṉḍe nū̃ riddhe san?	Had he/she boiled the egg?
past	3rd	pl.	laṛāī kītī sāne	ehnā̃ ne laṛāī kītī sī	They had had a fight

=== Copula ===
Oftentimes, a pronominal suffix will entirely overtake the regular copula (of the same person and number) in Majhi.

This is most common with the third-person plural ne (ਨੇ / نے) or nẽ (ਨੇਂ / نیں), used instead of han. It has become so widespread that it is now regarded as a fundamental characteristic of Majhi, used to distinguish it from other dialects.

Phrase	Majhi	Standard Punjabi
They sleep	oh sōṉde ne ਓਹ ਸੌਂਦੇ ਨੇ اوہ سوندے نے	oh sōṉde han ਉਹ ਸੌਂਦੇ ਹਨ اوہ سوندے ہن

- Alternate auxiliary verbs

First person singular ā̃ or jē (ਆਂ, ਜੇ / آں، جے) is used. E.g. mẽ karnā ʷā̃ / jē (ਮੈਂ ਕਰਨਾ ਆਂ, ਮੈਂ ਕਰਨਾ ਜੇ / میں کرنا آں، میں کرنا جے)

Third person singular ī or è (ਏ, ਵੇ, ਈ / اے، وے، ای) is used. E.g. ṓ kardā ī (ਉਹ ਕਰਦਾ ਈ / اوہ کردا ای)

=== Other Features ===
hē(gā) sī is used instead of sīgā.

=== Adverbial pronouns ===
Majhi uses the kiññ and kivẽ classes of adverbial pronouns of manner, which, at their base, are common with Western Punjabi dialects.

Adverbial pronoun	Majhi	Malwai	Doabi	Pahari-Pothwari	Hindko	Saraiki	Jatki
like this	ēṉj, ēvẽ ਐਂਞ, ਐਵੇਂ اینج، ایویں	ēvẽ ਐਵੇਂ ایویں	ēdā̃ ਐਦਾਂ ایدّاں	iṉj ਇੰਞ اِنج	iṉjū ਇੰਞੂ اِنجوُ	hiṉj, īvẽ ਹਿੰਞ, ਈਵੇਂ اِیویں / ہِنج	iṉj ਇੰਞ اِنج
like that	oṉj, ovẽ ਓਂਞ, ਓਵੇਂ اُنج	ovẽ ਐਵੇਂ اوویں	odā̃ ਐਵੇਂ اودّاں	uṉj ਐਵੇਂ اُنج	uṉjū ਐਵੇਂ اُنجوُ	huṉj / ūvẽ ਐਵੇਂ اوویں / ہُنج	uṉj ਐਵੇਂ اُنج
how?	kiṉj, kivẽ ਕਿੰਞ, ਕਿਵੇਂ کنج، کویں	kivẽ ਕਿਵੇਂ کویں	kiddā̃ ਕਿੱਦਾਂ کداں	kiṉj ਕਿੰਞ کنج	kiṉjū ਕਿੰਞੂ کنجو	kiṉj, kīvẽ ਕਿੰਞ, ਕੀਵੇਂ کنج، کیویں	kiṉj ਕਿੰਞ کنج
how	jiṉj, jivẽ ਜਿੰਞ, ਜਿਵੇਂ کنج، کویں	jivẽ ਜਿਵੇਂ کویں	jiddā̃ ਜਿੱਦਾਂ کداں	jiṉj ਜਿੰਞ کنج	jiṉjū ਜਿੰਞੂ کنجو	jiṉj, jīvẽ ਜਿੰਞ, ਜੀਵੇਂ کنج، کیویں	jiṉj ਜਿੰਞ کنج

- Use of -na verb ending instead of -da ending for first-person and second-person point of view

Phrase	Majhi	Standard Written Punjabi
I do	mẽ karnā ʷā̃̀ ਮੈਂ ਕਰਨਾ ਆਂ میں کرنا آں	mẽ kardā hā̃ ਮੈਂ ਕਰਦਾ ਹਾਂ میں کردا ہاں
Let's (m.) go home	asī kàr jāne ā̃̀ (Note: kàr, meaning "home", is often said as kār in Northwestern Majhi (spoken in Gujrat, Jhelum, and Bhimber districts) as the vowel is elongated.) ਅਸੀ ਘਰ ਜਾਨੇ ਆਂ اسی گھر جانے آں	asī̃ kàr jānde hā̃ ਅਸੀਂ ਘਰ ਜਾਂਦੇ ਹਾਂ اسی گھر جاندے ہاں
We (f.) do	asī̃ karniyā̃ ʷā̃̀ ਅਸੀ ਕਰਨੀਆਂ ਆਂ اسی کرنِیاں واں	asī̃ kardiyā̃ hā̃ ਅਸੀਂ ਕਰਦੀਆਂ ਹਾਂ اسی کردِیاں ہاں
You (sing.) do	tū̃ karnā aĩ̀ ਤੂੰ ਕਰਨਾ ਐਂ تُوں کرنا ایں	tū̃ kardā haĩ ਤੂੰ ਕਰਦਾ ਹੈਂ تُوں کردا ہیں
You (f.pl.) do	tusī karniyā̃ ò/je ਤੁਸੀ ਕਰਨੀਆਂ ਓ/ਜੇ تسی کرنِیاں او/جے	tusī̃ kardiyā̃ ho ਤੁਸੀਂ ਕਰਦੀਆਂ ਹੋ تسی کردِیاں ہو

=== Examples of Majhi ===
Sentence		Transliteration	Translation
Shahmukhi	Gurmukhi	Transliteration	Translation
تُوں لہور جاندا سیں	ਤੂੰ ਲਹੌਰ ਜਾਂਦਾ ਸੈਂ	tū̃ lahaur jāndā saĩ	You used to go to Lahore
میں پہلوں ہی آکھدا ساں	ਮੈਂ ਪਹਿਲੋਂ ਹੀ ਆਖਦਾ ਸਾਂ	maĩ pahlõ hī ākhdā sā̃	I've already said it
اودݨ بھرجائی کتھے سن	ਓਦਣ ਭਰਜਾਈ ਕਿੱਥੇ ਸਨ	oddaṇ bharjāī kitthe san	Where were the sisters-in-law that day?

== Subdialectal differences ==
=== Northeastern Majhi ===
Northeastern Majhi refers to the subdialect spoken in a belt from the Sialkot District to the Ravi River.

It has considerable Doabi influence.

Northeastern Majhi uses the past-tense inflection of the verb ḍahṇā (ਡਹਿਣਾ / ڈہݨا) to form continuous tenses, rather than pēṇā (ਪੈਣਾ/ پَیݨا) which is used by other Majhi subdialects and Punjabi dialects.

Phrase	Eastern Majhi	General Majhi	Standard Punjabi
He^{(prox.)} was doing	eh karaṇ ḍahyā sī ਏਹ ਕਰਣ ਡਹਿਆ ਸੀ اوہ کرݨ ڈہیا سی	eh kardā pyā sī ਏਹ ਕਰਦਾ ਪਿਆ ਸੀ اوہ کردا پیا سی	eh kar rahyā sī ਇਹ ਕਰ ਰਿਹਾ ਸੀ اوہ کر رہیا سی
She^{(dist.)} is doing	oh karaṇ ḍahī hē ਓਹ ਕਰਣ ਡਹੀ ਹੈ اوہ کرݨ ڈہی اے	oh kardī paī hē ਓਹ ਕਰਦੀ ਪਈ ਹੈ اوہ کردی پئی ہے	oh kar rahī hē ਉਹ ਕਰ ਰਹੀ ਹੈ اوہ کر رہی ہے

In Northeastern Majhi, on top of the copula-replacement by ne, it is also common for the second-person plural pronominal suffix je (ਜੇ / جے) to overtake ho.

Phrase	Northeastern Majhi	General Majhi
You will go home	tusī̃ ghar jāṉde je ਤੁਸੀਂ ਘਰ ਜਾਂਦੇ ਜੇ تسیں گھر جاندے جے	tusī̃ ghar jāṉde ho ਤੁਸੀਂ ਘਰ ਜਾਂਦੇ ਹੋ تسیں گھر جاندے ہو

This variety of Majhi also tends to debuccalize all its non-initial non-geminated voiceless alveolar fricatives (/s/) into glottal fricatives (/ɦ/); i.e. the s sound is heard as a h. This h is distinguished from the regular phonetic h by its lack of tonality.

Word	Punjabi spelling	General pronunciation	Northeastern pronunciation	Translation
tusī̃	ਤੁਸੀਂ تسیں	[tʊsĩ]	[tʊɦĩ]	you (pl./honorific)
asāḍā	ਅਸਾਡਾ اساڈا	[ɐ̆saˑɖˑa]	[ɐ̆ɦaˑɖˑa]	our(s) / my/mine (honorific)
paise	ਪੈਸੇ پیسے	[pɛˑsˑe]	[pɛːɦe]	money

=== Northwestern Majhi ===
Northwestern Majhi refers to the subdialect spoken in the northwestern side of the Majha region in Pakistan, primarily in the districts of Gujrat, Jhelum, and Bhimber.

In these areas, word-initial 'h' is fainter and more tonal, eventually disappearing in upper Punjabi dialects like Pahari-Pothwari and Hazarewal Hindko, as well as Dogri. I.e., words like hatth (ਹੱਥ / ہَتّھ) "hand" are said more as àtth.

Another notable difference is the use of the suffix dā instead of gā for indicative future tense:

General Majhi	Northwestern Majhi	Translation
kare gā ਕਰੇਗਾ کرے گا	kare dā ਕਰੇਦਾ کرے دا	[he] will do
khāṇ giyā̃ ਖਾਣਗੀਆਂ کھاݨ گیاں	khāṇ diyā̃ ਖਾਣਦੀਆਂ کھاݨ دیاں	[they] (f.) will eat
jāvo ge ਜਾਵੋਗੇ جاوو گے	jāvo de ਜਾਵੋਦੇ جاوو دے	[you] (pl. m.) will go
samjhā̃ gī ਸਮਝਾਂਗੀ سمجھاں گی	samjhā̃ dī ਸਮਝਾਂਦੀ سمجھاں دی	[I] (f.) will understand

Northwestern Majhi also has its own past-tense copula, which declines on gender and number, unlike other Majhi subdialects, whose copula declines on person and number.

General Majhi	Northwestern Majhi	Translation
tū̃ nhāyā sēṉ ਤੂੰ ਨ੍ਹਾਇਆ ਸੈਂ توں نھایا سیں	tū̃ nhāyā āhā ਤੂੰ ਨ੍ਹਾਇਆ ਆਹਾ توں نھایا آہا	You (s. m.) had bathed
oh kiddhar sī? ਓਹ ਕਿੱਧਰ ਸੀ? اوہ کدھر سی؟	oh kiddhar āhī? ਓਹ ਕਿੱਧਰ ਆਹੀ? اوہ کدھر آہی؟	Where was she?
mēṉ paṉchī vekhe san ਮੈਂ ਪੰਛੀ ਵੇਖੇ ਸਨ میں پنچھی ویکھے سن	mēṉ paṉchī vekhe āhe ਮੈਂ ਪੰਛੀ ਵੇਖੇ ਆਹੇ میں پنچھی ویکھے آہے	I had seen birds
bakkriyāṉ mamyāiyāṉ san ਬੱਕਰੀਆਂ ਮਮਿਆਈਆਂ ਸਨ بکریاں ممیائیاں سن	bakkriyāṉ mamyāiyāṉ āhiyāṉ ਬੱਕਰੀਆਂ ਮਮਿਆਈਆਂ ਆਹੀਆਂ بکریاں ممیائیاں آہیاں	The goats had bleated

== See also ==
- Punjabi dialects
- Punjabi literature
- Jhangvi dialect
- Shahpuri dialect
- Dhanni dialect
