= Punjabi language =

Indo-Aryan language

Punjabi
- Panjābī
- پنجابی; ਪੰਜਾਬੀ
- 'Punjabi' written in Shahmukhi script (top) and Gurmukhi script (bottom)
- Pronunciation: [pəɲˈd͡ʒaːbːi]
- Native to: Pakistan and India
- Region: Punjab
- Ethnicity: Punjabis
- Native speakers: 156.7 million (2011–2023) (Note: 2011 Indian Census and 2023 Pakistani Census; The figure includes the Saraiki and Hindko varieties which have been separately enumerated in Pakistani censuses since 1981 and 2017 respectively; 88.9 million [Punjabi, general], 28.8 million [Saraiki], 5.5 million [Hindko] in Pakistan (2023), 31.1 in India (2011), 0.8 in Saudi Arabia (Ethnologue), 0.6 in Canada (2016), 0.3 in the United Kingdom (2011), 0.3 in the United States (2017), 0.2 in Australia (2016) and 0.2 in the United Arab Emirates. See § Geographic distribution below.)
- Language family: Indo-European: Indo-Iranian; Indo-Aryan; Northwestern; Punjabi
- Early forms: Prakrit (debated) (Note: Paishachi, Saurasheni, or Gandhari Prakrits have been proposed as the ancestor Middle Indo-Aryan language to Punjabi.): Apabhraṃśa (debated); Old Punjabi (Note: Around 10th century); Middle Punjabi; Early Modern Punjabi (Note: 16th century onwards)
- Standard forms: Standard Punjabi
- Dialects: See Punjabi dialects
- Writing system: Shāhmukhī (official, Pakistan) (Note: As mandated by the Punjab Institute of Language, Art and Culture (PILAC) under the Government of Punjab.); Gurmukhī (official, India); Punjabi Braille; Historical: Laṇḍā (Multani); Tākri; Devanāgarī; Anandpur Lipi

Official status
- Official language in: India; Punjab; Haryana (additional); Delhi (additional); West Bengal (additional) (Note: In blocks and divisions with at least 10% Punjabi speakers)
- Regulated by: Pakistan: Punjab Institute of Language, Art and Culture; India: Department of Languages

Language codes
- ISO 639-1: pa
- ISO 639-2: pan
- ISO 639-3: pan – inclusive code Individual codes: pan – Eastern Punjabi pnb – Western Punjabi
- Glottolog: lahn1241
- Linguasphere: 59-AAF-e
- Geographic distribution of Punjabi (all varieties) in South Asia

Punjabi (sometimes spelled Panjabi) (Note: /pʌnˈdʒɑːbi/ pun-JAH-bee; Shahmukhi: پنجابی; Gurmukhi: ਪੰਜਾਬੀ, Punjabi: [pə̞ˈɲd͡ʒaːbːi].; Punjabi is the British English spelling, and Panjābī is the romanized spelling from the native scripts.) is an Indo-Aryan language belonging to the Indo-Iranian branch of the Indo-European language family. It is primarily spoken by the Punjabi people native to the Punjab region of Pakistan and India. With over 156 million speakers across all its varieties, it is the seventh most spoken native language and the twelfth most spoken language by the total number of speakers in the world. (Note: This ranking is attained when all of its varieties (Western Punjabi, Eastern Punjabi, and the various dialects as a whole) are taken as one, which are otherwise sometimes ranked separately.)

Punjabi is the third most spoken native language in South Asia (after Hindi and Bengali). It is the most widely-spoken native language in Pakistan, with 123.2 million speakers across all its language varieties, (Note: Punjabi: 88.9 million Saraiki: 28.8 million Hindko: 5.5 million) according to the 2023 census; and the 11th most widely-spoken in India, with 31.1 million native speakers, according to the 2011 census. It is also spoken among a significant overseas diaspora, particularly in Canada, the United Kingdom, the United States, Australia, the Gulf states, and Southeast Asia.

Being classified under the Northwestern branch of the Indo-Aryan languages, Punjabi is most closely related to Sindhi. It is the only Indo-Aryan language thought to have descended from more than one Prakrit, which gradually developed into Old Punjabi. The language's earliest writings can be traced to the Nath jogis of the Pothohar Plateau from the 9th century. It further developed during the Islamic period in South Asia, undergoing lexical expansion from Arabic and Persian influence; and raising poets like Baba Farid. Middle Punjabi produced the great literary works of Punjabi folklore, alongside strengthening the Islamic mystic literary tradition, and playing a vital role in the development of Sant Bhasha, the language of the Guru Granth Sahib – the holiest book in Sikhism. Modern Punjabi arose in the colonial era out of Early Modern Punjabi, which helped establish a literary standard spread widely by poets including Bulleh Shah and Waris Shah among many.

Being a diagraphic language, it is written using two standard scripts: Shahmukhi, based on the Perso-Arabic script, in Pakistan; and Gurmukhi, based on the Indic scripts, in India. Punjabi is an inflected language, with six cases for noun, three for personal pronoun, five for third-person pronoun; two genders (masculine, feminine); and two numbers (singular, plural). It is also a tonal language – specifically employing lexical tone – which makes it unusual among the Indo-Aryan languages and its broader Indo-European language family where tonalisation is not common. The base of its vocabulary is derived from Sanskrit in the form of Prakrit, while a significant portion of its high-register speech is derived from Persian and Arabic, (Note: The ratio of Persian and Arabic vocabulary is higher in the Pakistani dialects.) along with a number of recent loanwords borrowed from English and Portuguese among other European languages. It has also had minor influence from and on neighbouring languages such as Sindhi, Hindi–Urdu, Pashto, Dogri, and Kashmiri.

Punjabi has many dialects spread throughout the Punjab region and its surroundings, which are grouped into two main categories – Eastern Punjabi and Western Punjabi; with the Majhi dialect (Central Punjabi) being intermediate between both and forming the basis of Standard Punjabi in both Pakistan and India. It is the official language in the Indian state of Punjab, and carries nominal provincial status in the Pakistani province of Punjab.

== Etymology ==
The word Punjabi (also spelled Panjābī, from the native pronunciation) has been derived from the word Panj-āb, Persian for 'Five Waters', referring to the five major eastern tributaries of the Indus River which flow through the Punjab region. The name of the region was introduced by the Turko-Persian conquerors of South Asia and was a translation of the Sanskrit and Ancient Greek names Panchanada and Pentapotamia, respectively, meaning 'Land of the Five Rivers'.

Panj is cognate with other Indo-European languages' words for five, like Sanskrit pañca (पञ्च), Greek pénte (πέντε) and Lithuanian penki, but also English five; āb is cognate with Sanskrit áp (अप्) and with the Av- of Avon. The historical Punjab region, now divided between India and Pakistan, is defined physiographically by the Indus River and these five tributaries. One of the five, the Beas River, is a tributary of another, the Sutlej.

== History ==
=== Overview ===
Nearly all scholars agree that Punjabi is an Indo-Aryan language, (Note: Prem Prakash Singh, Kala Singh Bedi, Sant Singh Sekhon, Vidya Bhasker Arun, Piara Singh Padam, and Duni Chand all supported the classification of Punjabi as Indo-Aryan. Only the fringe opinion of Ainul Haq Faridkhoti disagrees with Punjabi being an Indo-Aryan language, based upon flawed reasoning as per S. S. Joshi (1998).) however the precise Prakrit or Apabrahmsha that Punjabi derived from is disputed. Punjabi belongs to the Indic branch of the Indo-Iranian languages, deriving from Old Indic. Old Indic lasted until 500 BCE, being succeeded by regional Prākrits, with the Earlier Middle Indic period lasting from 500 BCE – 500 CE. This initial period was succeeded by the Later Middle Indic period, lasting from 500 CE – 1000 CE, consisting of later Prakrits (Apabhraṁśa), such as Śaurasenī and Paiśachī. Modern Indic languages derived from these Apabhraṁśas from roughly 1000 CE onwards, with there being no clear delineation between the Later Middle Indic and Early New Indic stages.

Punjabi itself is divided into four stages of development by Padam (1954) and Bhardwaj (2016):

- First phase (1000–1400 CE, also called Old Punjabi) - with surviving works authored by Addahmāṇ (Abdul Rahman) and other works attributed to Fariduddin Ganjshakar (however the attribution is disputed and Ganjshakar's claimed works in the Sikh scripture may date to a later period by a different author named Farid Sani/Ibrahim Farid)
- Second phase (1400–1700 CE, also called Medieval Punjabi) - with surviving works authored by Farid Sani/Ibrahim Farid and the Sikh gurus
- Third phase (1700–1850 CE, also called Middle Punjabi)
- Fourth phase (1850 CE to present, also called Modern Punjabi)

Alternatively, the stages are trifucated as follows by Bhatia (1993):

- The precursor stage of Punjabi between the 10th and 16th centuries is termed 'Old Punjabi'.
- The stage between the 16th and 19th centuries is termed as 'Medieval Punjabi'.
- Modern Punjabi emerged in the 19th century from the Medieval Punjabi stage.

=== Origin ===
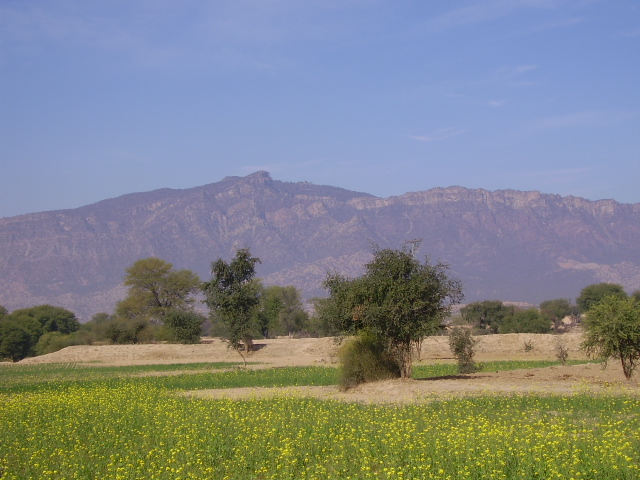
Tilla Jogian, Dina, Jhelum District, Punjab, Pakistan, a hilltop associated with many Nath jogis (considered among compilers of earlier Punjabi works)

Punjabi developed from Prakrit languages and later Apabhraṃśa (Sanskrit: अपभ्रंश, 'deviated' or 'non-grammatical speech') From 600 BC, Sanskrit developed as the standard literary and administrative language and Prakrit languages evolved into many regional languages in different parts of India. All these languages are called Prakrit languages (Sanskrit: प्राकृत, prākṛta) collectively. Paishachi Prakrit was one of these Prakrit languages, which was spoken in north and north-western India and Punjabi developed from this Prakrit. Later in northern India Paishachi Prakrit gave rise to Paishachi Apabhraṃśa, a descendant of Prakrit. Punjabi emerged as an Apabhramsha, a form of Prakrit, in the 7th century AD and became stable by the 10th century. Padam (1954) believed that eastern Punjabi emerged from Shauraseni while Lahnda emerged from Paishachi. According to Mangat Bhardwaj, it is possible that now Western and Eastern Punjabi speaking zones may have originally spoken different Apabhraṁśas, with the Lahnda zone being primarily Paiśāchī Apabhraṁśa while the Eastern Punjabi area consisted of a transitional zone of Śaurasenī merging into Paiśāchī, with Śaurasenī being spoken in the neighbouring Western Hindi zone.

The earliest writings in Punjabi belong to the Nath Yogi-era from 9th to 14th century. The language of these compositions is morphologically closer to Shauraseni Apbhramsa, though vocabulary and rhythm is surcharged with extreme colloquialism and folklore. Writing in 1317–1318, Amir Khusrau referred to the language spoken by locals around the area of Lahore as Lahauri. There was a long period of literary interaction between Western (Lahnda) and Eastern Punjabi in the subsequent period, showcased in the works of Muslim Sufis and Sikhs.

=== Medieval period ===
The Arabic and Modern Persian influence in the historical Punjab region began with the late first millennium Muslim conquests in the Indian subcontinent. Sanskrit was replaced by Persian for the purpose of an unlocalised language used for administrative, secular, and religious-intellectual writings (although Sanskrit retained some usage in the last category). Usage of local Indo-Aryan languages for literature increased during the Mughal period, usually for spiritual poetry. Since then, many Persian words have been incorporated into Punjabi (such as zamīn, śahir etc.) and are used with a liberal approach. Through Persian, Punjabi also absorbed many Arabic-derived words like dukān, ġazal and more, as well as Turkic words like qēncī, sōġāt, etc. After the fall of the Sikh empire, Urdu was made the official language of Punjab under the British (in Pakistani Punjab, it is still the primary official language) and influenced the language as well, replacing Persian. Sikhs in the 17th, 18th and early 19th centuries primarily composed literature in Persian and Braj rather than Punjabi. Thus, during the mediaeval period, the development of written Punjabi was primarily done by Muslim Sufis, written in Persian script. Religious practices remained mostly conducted in Punjabi, especially with the Sufis.

In pre-colonial Punjab, there was no standardised form of the Punjabi language (with it being primarily oral and lacking a formal grammar and lexicon) but rather several dialects and variants were utilised and built upon a linguistically heterogenous literary and oral tradition. The scenario is described as a diglossia, where peoples' language varied depending on setting, such as if at home or in the bazaar, and medium, whether written or spoken. There was a difference between classical and vernacular registers. The inhabitants likely had degrees of intelligibility with neighbouring languages due to shared linguistic features and roots. The region was historically influenced by a variety of Punjabi dialects and other languages, such as Persian, Arabic, Sanskrit, Kashmiri, Balochi, Pashto, Khariboli, and Braj. A Sanskritic background became influence by Perso-Islamicate culture. A variety of scripts were in use for a variety of purposes, such as Perso-Arabic, Gurmukhi, and Landa, with spellings varying for words based upon individual preference or region.

==== Influence of and on other languages ====
Due to the influence of Islam, some Arabic words sourced from the Quran along with aiyas (verses) found its way into the Punjabi lexicon. Sufi traditions exhibited Persinate influences on Punjabi. Meanwhile, Sanskrit had influence due to Puranic and Itihasic literature. In the second millennium, Punjabi was lexically influenced by Portuguese (words like almārī), Greek (words like dām), Japanese (words like rikśā), Chinese (words like cāh, līcī, lukāṭh) and English (words like jajj, apīl, māsṭar), though these influences have been minor in comparison to Persian and Arabic. In fact, the sounds /z/ (ਜ਼ / ز ژ ذ ض ظ), /ɣ/ (ਗ਼ / غ), /q/ (ਕ਼ / ق), /ʃ/ (ਸ਼ / ش), /x/ (ਖ਼ / خ) and /f/ (ਫ਼ / ف) are all borrowed from Persian, but in some instances the latter three arise natively. Later, the letters ਜ਼ / ز, ਸ਼ / ش and ਫ਼ / ف began being used in English borrowings, with ਸ਼ / ش also used in Sanskrit borrowings.

Punjabi has also had minor influence from and on neighbouring languages such as Sindhi, Haryanvi, Pashto and Hindustani.

=== Colonial period ===
The Mughal Empire and its later successor states in the 18th century, including the Sikhs (such as the Sikh Empire) used Persian for administration in the region rather than Punjabi. In 1837 with Act XXIX, the British East India Company discarded usage of Persian for governance and replaced it with English and local Indian languages. With the onset of colonial-rule in Punjab in 1849, the British promoted Urdu and adopted it as their administrative language in British Punjab rather than Punjabi. The reasons for this are multifactoral, such as:

- because Urdu already had more standardisation (based on the Delhite variety) while a standardised Punjabi was still a work in the making
- while Urdu was not spoken by many in the region, it was still mostly intelligible and comprehensible to the Punjabi population, while Punjabi was viewed as fragmented with varying dialectal variations and forms
- Urdu was viewed as the rightful successor of Persian for Indian administration (especially in the North-Western Province), being seen as a "vulgar" form of the latter with a similar grammar, lexis, script, etc.
- more British administrators were already familiar with Urdu (being taught it at Haileybury College), which was used for administration in other regions of India, rather than Persian or Punjabi
- Indian (such as Bengalis) assistants of the British who came to the Punjab were not familiar with Punjabi and more proficient in Urdu
- them mistakenly believing Punjabi was a dialect of Urdu (due to similar grammar and vocabulary), a view first proposed by Robert Leech in his 1849 work
- believing Punjabi was primarily an oral rather than a literary linguistic tradition, which they viewed as "uncivilised"
- Punjabi and Gurmukhi was associated with the Sikhs and the British wanted to rid the Punjab of structures and authorities associated with the former, indigenous Sikh-rule (an idea developed under the Punjab School of Administration), plus that the Sikhs were a religious minority while most Punjabis were Muslims, thus using a script associated with the Sikhs was problematic

Urdu was immediately adopted after annexation in Lahore and Jhelum divisions, and parts of Multan division. Persian persisted for a short while in early British administration of the region between 1849–1851, especially in much of Multan and Peshawar, who strongly advocated for continued use of Persian. An 1851–54 report noted the following regarding the language: "Punjabee as a spoken language, is also losing its currency, and degenerating into a mere provincial and rustic dialect." Usage of Punjabi for official purposes was not considered until the early 1860s., with a proponent for the usage of Punjabi for legal purposes being Robert Needham Cust. However, N. W. Elphinstone disagreed with the usage of Punjabi for the courts and believed Urdu was more suitable for the new generation of the educated-class. Thomas Douglas Forsyth believed that Punjabi was not suitable for written records due to a perceived paucity of literature and grammar regarding the language. In 1862 when the Director of Public Instruction in Punjab, A. R. Fuller, was asked by the Secretary Government of the Punjab if Punjabi could be used in legal settings, he stated a characteristically negative view of Punjabi that was common in the early colonial period:

Punjabee is merely a dialect of Urdoo ... As a written language it makes its appearance only in the Goormookhee Character, a bastard form of the Nagree, almost as bad as the Kuyasthe of the N.W. Provinces."

— A. R. Fuller, 22 July 1862, No. 32, in, Nazir Ahmad Chaudhry. Punjab Government Record Office Publications. Development of Urdu as Official Language in the Punjab (1849-1947). Lahore: Evergreen Press, 1977, p. 37

The Lawrence school of administrators continued to serve in governining positions in Punjab up until the 1870s, influencing the administration's views on the Punjabi language. The 1868 census claimed that only around 380,000 people (around 2% of the population, mostly men) were literate in Punjab. Despite the adoption of Urdu as the administrative language, the population remained largerly Punjabi-speaking, with 95% of the population of Punjab province speaking Punjabi as per the 1881 census. Christian missionary institutions, such as the Serampore Mission Press and Ludhiana Mission Press, published works in Punjabi in Gurmukhi script (such as translations of Christian literature) and conducted linguistic research on the language by producing grammars and dictionaries. Standardisation and formalisation of the Punjabi language is attributed initially to Christian missionaries and more successfully by Sikh revalivists, notably the Singh Sabha movement. Shackle believes that standard Punjabi took on a true and more complete formulation starting in the 20th century under the Sikh reformers.

=== Modern times ===
Modern Punjabi has two main varieties, Western Punjabi and Eastern Punjabi, which have many dialects and forms, altogether spoken by over 150 million people. The Majhi dialect, which is transitional between the two main varieties, has been adopted as standard Punjabi in India and Pakistan for education and mass media. The Majhi dialect originated in the Majha region of the Punjab.

English	Gurmukhi-based (Punjab, India)	Shahmukhi-based (Punjab, Pakistan)
President	ਰਾਸ਼ਟਰਪਤੀ (rāshtarpatī)	صدرمملکت (sadar-e mumlikat)
Article	ਲੇਖ (lēkh)	مضمون (mazmūn)
Prime Minister	ਪਰਧਾਨ ਮੰਤਰੀ (pardhān mantarī)*	وزیراعظم (vazīr-e aʿzam)
Family	ਪਰਵਾਰ (parvār)* ਟੱਬਰ (ṭabbar)	خاندان (kḥāndān) ٹبّر (ṭabbar)
Philosophy	ਫ਼ਲਸਫ਼ਾ (falsafā) ਦਰਸ਼ਨ (darshan)	فلسفہ (falsafah)
Capital city	ਰਾਜਧਾਨੀ (rājdhānī)	دارالحکومت (dār-al ḥakūmat)
Viewer	ਦਰਸ਼ਕ (darshak)	ناظرین (nāzarīn)
Listener	ਸਰੋਤਾ (sarotā)	سامع (sāmaʿ)

Note: In more formal contexts, hypercorrect Sanskritized versions of these words (ਪ੍ਰਧਾਨ pradhān for ਪਰਧਾਨ pardhān and ਪਰਿਵਾਰ parivār for ਪਰਵਾਰ parvār) may be used.

==== India ====
Modern Standard Punjabi, written in Gurmukhi script, emerged in the post-independent India as a standardized form of the language in Indian Punjab, being largely based upon Majhi and Lahnda but also influenced by other dialects after 1947, namely Malwai and Doabi. According to Christopher Shackle, Modern Standard Punjabi arose in Punjab in around 1900 as a result of the Singh Sabha movement, associated with a revitalization of Sikhism. It later developed further during the Punjabi Suba movement. Punjabi written in Gurmukhi script was adopted as the official language and script of Punjab, India on 18 April 1968. However, usage of English remains prevalent in Indian Punjab in legal, legislative, administrative, and commercial settings, especially by the federal/central government in its written communications where as the state government uses Punjabi more frequently in its writings. In regards to oral communication in such administrative settings, Punjabi is more dominant. Furthermore, there is a lack of quality education in the language, especially in lower sections of the schooling system. A number of educational and government institutions work for the promotion and cultivation of Punjabi in the state, such as by having dedicated Punjabi departments. Punjabi's status was regarded as stable in 1989.

In India, Punjabi is written in the Gurmukhī script in offices, schools, and media. Gurmukhi is the official standard script for Punjabi, though it is often unofficially written in the Latin scripts due to influence from English, one of India's two primary official languages at the Union-level. In India, between 1961–1981, an estimated 5,282 Punjabi works were published in Punjab, Haryana, Rajasthan, Uttar Pradesh, Chandigarh, and Delhi. Furthermore, there were 27 newspapers and 671 magazines and journals in Punjabi by 1989. Punjabi cinema is also active, with 2,377 short-films and 117 feature-films being produced by 1989. In regards to Punjabi music, 331 music-records and 47 music-tapes were known by 1989. Punjabi also has dedicated radio and television programs. Between 20–22 February 2026, a conference was held at Guru Nanak Dev University on the occasion of the World Punjabi Conference regarding the usage of artificial intelligence for the development of the Punjabi language by helping making the language's content more accessible to the public.

==== Pakistan ====
In Pakistan, Punjabi is generally written using the Shahmukhī script, which in literary standards, is identical to the Urdu alphabet, however various attempts have been made to create certain, distinct characters from a modification of the Persian Nastaʿlīq characters to represent Punjabi phonology, not already found in the Urdu alphabet. In Pakistan, Punjabi loans technical words from Persian and Arabic, just like Urdu does. In Pakistan, there have been proposals for a Pakistani Standard Punjabi. In December 1951, Faqeer Muhammad Faqeer advocated for the Pakistani standard to be based upon the dialect of the Gujranwala region due to its central location and literary history. Later, Sardar Muhammad Khan made the case for the usage of the Lahndi variety spoken in Warzirabad as the basis for a Pakistani Standard Punjabi. He also advocated for the usage of Perso-Arabic script. In recent decades, the Punjabi language has been in decline in Pakistan. However, a language revitalization movement started in earnest in the 1990s to revive it.

==== Abroad ====
Due to the Punjabi diaspora settling in a plethora of countries abroad, the study of the Punjabi language increased overseas and educational programs and learning books were developed by a number of institutions to accommodate this and develop a standardised format, especially in the United States, Canada, the United Kingdom, and Singapore. Punjabi began being taught at the University of California, Berkeley in the early 1990s. Punjabi language courses began being taught at Beijing Foreign Studies University (BFSU) in China in 2026. Punjabi became available for professional study in New Zealand in 2026 via the Institute of Sikh Studies New Zealand. Punjabi courses were considered at the University of Ottawa in 2018. Hockey Night in Canada had a Punjabi edition which was broadcast from 2008–2016. Due to the decline of immigrant languages with subsequent generations, Surrey, Canada has increased access to Punjabi content and resources to help assist with the continuation of the language in the locality. Diaporic Canadian Punjabi poetry, film, and theatre has been created.

== Geographic distribution ==
Punjabi is the most widely spoken language in Pakistan, the eleventh-most widely spoken in India, and also present in the Punjabi diaspora in various countries.

Approximate distribution of native Punjabi speakers (inc. Lahndic dialects) (assuming a rounded total of 157 million) worldwide.
1. Pakistan (inc. all Pakistani provinces) (78.6%)
2. India (inc. all Indian states) (19.8%)
3. Other Countries (1.60%)

According to Bhardwaj (2016), Punjabi is spoken by around 102 million people, if including both Eastern and Western dialectal varieties.

=== Pakistan ===
Punjabi is the most widely spoken language in Pakistan, being the native language of 88.9 million people, or approximately 37% of the country's population.

Census history of Punjabi speakers in Pakistan
Year	Population of Pakistan	Percentage	Punjabi speakers
1951	33,740,167	57.08%	22,632,905
1961	42,880,378	56.39%	28,468,282
1972	65,309,340	56.11%	43,176,004
1981	84,253,644	48.17%	40,584,980
1998	132,352,279	44.15%	58,433,431
2017	207,685,000	38.78%	80,540,000
2023	240,458,089	36.98%	88,915,544

Beginning with the 1981 and 2017 censuses respectively, speakers of the Western Punjabi's Saraiki and Hindko varieties were no longer included in the total numbers for Punjabi, which explains the apparent decrease. Pothwari speakers however are included in the total numbers for Punjabi.

=== India ===
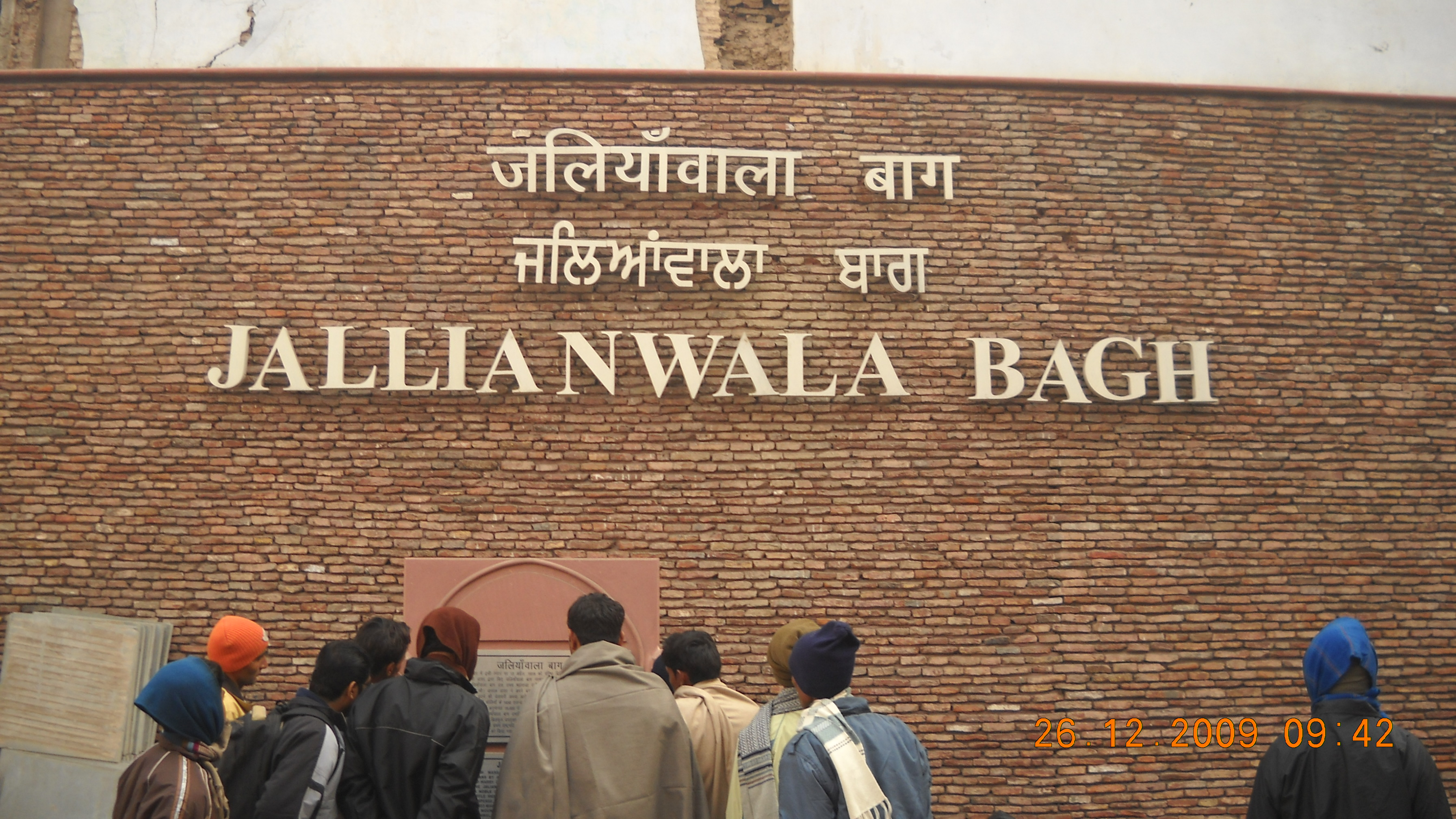
"Jallianwala Bagh" written in Hindi, Punjabi, and English in Amritsar, India.

Punjabi is the official language of the Indian state of Punjab, and has the status of an additional official language in Haryana and Delhi. Some of its major urban centres in northern India are Amritsar, Ludhiana, Chandigarh, Jalandhar, Ambala, Patiala, Bathinda, Hoshiarpur, Firozpur and Delhi.

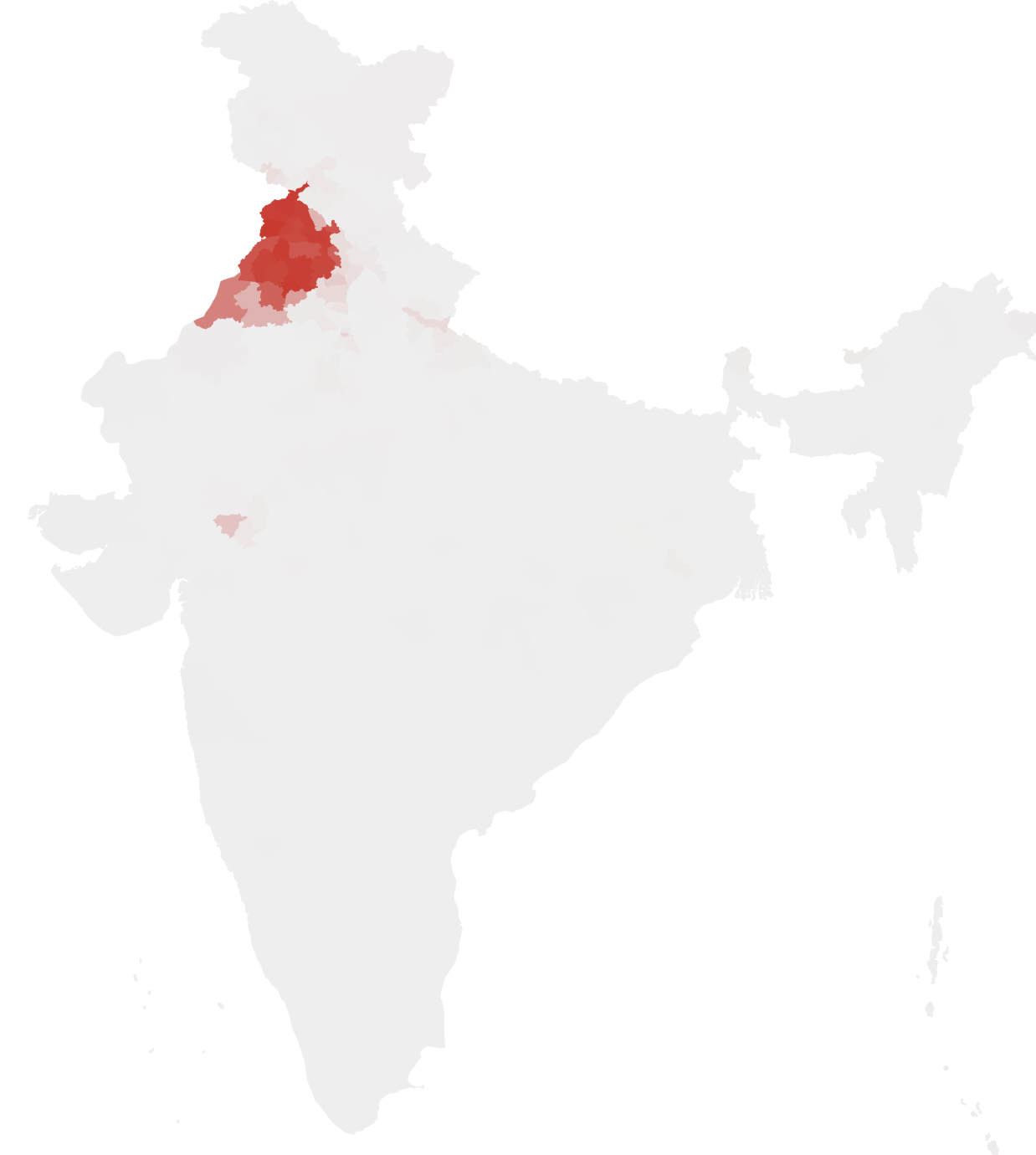
Punjabi in India

In the 2011 census of India, 31.14 million reported their language as Punjabi. The census publications group this with speakers of related "mother tongues" like Bagri and Bhateali to arrive at the figure of 33.12 million.

Census history of Punjabi speakers in India
Year	Population of India	Punjabi speakers in India	Percentage
1971	548,159,652	14,108,443	2.57%
1981	665,287,849	19,611,199	2.95%
1991	838,583,988	23,378,744	2.79%
2001	1,028,610,328	29,102,477	2.83%
2011	1,210,193,422	33,124,726	2.74%

=== Punjabi diaspora ===
Percentage of people in each Australian Bureau of Statistics (ABS) statistical area 1 (SA1) in the coastal New South Wales town of Woolgoolga and nearby Sandy Beach and Safety Beach who reported speaking Punjabi at home in the 2021 census. 0–5% 5–10% 10–15% 15–20% 20–25% 25–30% 30–35% 35–40%

Punjabi is also spoken as a minority language in several other countries where Punjabi people have emigrated in large numbers, such as the United States, Australia, the United Kingdom, and Canada.

There were 670,000 native Punjabi speakers in Canada in 2021, 300,000 in the United Kingdom in 2011, 280,000 in the United States and smaller numbers in other countries.

=== Punjabi speakers by country ===
Approximate number of Punjabi speakers by country
Country	Native number of speakers	Source
Pakistan	88,915,544	Census
India	33,124,726	Census
Saudi Arabia	777,000	Ethnologue
Canada	670,000	Census
UK	291,000	Census
USA	280,867	Census
Australia	239,033	Census
UAE	201,000	Ethnologue

== Major dialects ==
=== Standard Punjabi ===
Standard Punjabi (sometimes referred to as Majhi) is the standard form of Punjabi used commonly in education and news broadcasting, and is based on the Majhi dialect. Such as the variety used on Google Translate, Standard Punjabi is also often used in official online services that employ Punjabi. It is widely used in the TV and entertainment industry of Pakistan, which is mainly produced in Lahore.

The Standard Punjabi used in India and Pakistan has slight differences. In India, it excludes many of the dialect-specific features of Majhi. In Pakistan, the standard is closer to the Majhi spoken in the urban parts of Lahore.

=== Eastern Punjabi ===
"Eastern Punjabi" refers to the varieties of Punjabi spoken in Pakistani Punjab (specifically Northern Punjabi), most of Indian Punjab, the far-north of Rajasthan and on the northwestern border of Haryana. It includes the dialects of Majhi, Malwai, Doabi, Puadhi and the extinct Lubanki.

=== Western Punjabi ===
"Western Punjabi" or "Lahnda" (لہندا, lit. 'western') is the name given to the diverse group of Punjabi varieties spoken in the majority of Pakistani Punjab, the Hazara region, most of Azad Jammu and Kashmir and small parts of Indian Punjab such as Fazilka. These include groups of dialects like Saraiki, Pahari-Pothwari, Hindko and the extinct Inku; common dialects like Jhangvi, Shahpuri, Dhanni and Thali which are usually grouped under the term Jatki Punjabi; and the mixed variety of Punjabi and Sindhi called Khetrani.

Depending on context, the terms Eastern and Western Punjabi can simply refer to all the Punjabi varieties spoken in India and Pakistan respectively, whether or not they are linguistically Eastern/Western.

== Phonology ==
While a vowel length distinction between short and long vowels exists, reflected in modern orthographical conventions, it is secondary to the vowel quality contrast between centralised vowels /ɪ ə ʊ/ and peripheral vowels /iː eː ɛː aː ɔː oː uː/ in terms of phonetic significance.

Vowels
	Front	Near-front	Central	Near-back	Back
Close	iː ਈ اِی				uː ਊ اُو
Near-close		ɪ ਇ اِ		ʊ ਉ اُ	
Close-mid	eː ਏ اے				oː ਓ او
Mid			ə ਅ اَ		
Open-mid	ɛː ਐ اَے				ɔː ਔ اَو
Open			aː ਆ آ		

The peripheral vowels have nasal analogues. There is a tendency with speakers to insert an /ɪ̯/ between adjacent "a"-vowels as a separator. This may change to an /ʊ̯/ if either vowel is nasalised.

Consonants
		Labial	Dental/ Alveolar	Retroflex	Post-alv./ Palatal	Velar	Uvular	Glottal
Nasal		m ਮ م	n ਨ ن	ɳ ਣ ݨ	(ɲ) ਞ ن٘	(ŋ) ਙ ن٘		
Stop/ Affricate	tenuis	p ਪ پ	t̪ ਤ ت	ʈ ਟ ٹ	t͡ʃ ਚ چ	k ਕ ک	(q ਕ਼ ق)	
Stop/ Affricate	aspirated	pʰ ਫ پھ	tʰ ਥ تھ	ʈʰ ਠ ٹھ	t͡ʃʰ ਛ چھ	kʰ ਖ کھ		
Stop/ Affricate	voiced	b ਬ ب	d̪ ਦ د	ɖ ਡ ڈ	d͡ʒ ਜ ج	ɡ ਗ گ		
Stop/ Affricate	tonal	ਭ بھ	ਧ دھ	ਢ ڈھ	ਝ جھ	ਘ گھ		
Fricative	voiceless	(f ਫ਼ ف)	s ਸ س		ʃ ਸ਼ ش	(x ਖ਼ خ)		
Fricative	voiced		(z ਜ਼ ز)			(ɣ ਗ਼ غ)		ɦ ਹ ہ
Rhotic			ɾ~r ਰ ر	ɽ ੜ ڑ				
Approximant		ʋ ਵ و	l ਲ ل	ɭ ਲ਼ ࣇ	j ਯ ی			

Note: for the tonal stops, refer to the next section about Tone.

The three retroflex consonants /ɳ, ɽ, ɭ/ do not occur initially, and the nasals [ŋ, ɲ] most commonly occur as allophones of /n/ in clusters with velars and palatals (there are few exceptions). The well-established phoneme /ʃ/ may be realised allophonically as the voiceless retroflex fricative [ʂ] in learned clusters with retroflexes. Due to its foreign origin, it is often also realised as [s], in e.g. shalwār /salᵊ.ʋaːɾᵊ/. The phonemic status of the consonants /f, z, x, ɣ, q/ varies with familiarity with Hindustani norms, more so with the Gurmukhi script, with the pairs /f, pʰ/, /z, d͡ʒ/, /x, kʰ/, /ɣ, g/, and /q, k/ systematically distinguished in educated speech, /q/ being the most rarely pronounced. The retroflex lateral is most commonly analysed as an approximant as opposed to a flap. Some speakers soften the voiceless aspirates /t͡ʃʰ, pʰ, kʰ/ into fricatives /ɕ, f, x/ respectively.

In rare cases, the /ɲ/ and /ŋ/ phonemes in Shahmukhi may be represented with letters from Sindhi. The /ɲ/ phoneme, which is more common than /ŋ/, is written as نی or نج depending on its phonetic preservation, e.g. نیاݨا /ɲaːɳaː/ (preserved ñ) as opposed to کنج /kiɲd͡ʒ/ (assimilated into nj). /ŋ/ is always written as نگ.

=== Diphthongs ===
Like Hindustani, the diphthongs /əɪ/ and /əʊ/ have mostly disappeared, but are still retained in some dialects.

Phonotactically, long vowels /aː, iː, uː/ are treated as doubles of their short vowel counterparts /ə, ɪ, ʊ/ rather than separate phonemes. Hence, diphthongs like ai and au get monophthongised into /eː/ and /oː/, and āi and āu into /ɛː/ and /ɔː/ respectively.

The phoneme /j/ is very fluid in Punjabi. /j/ is only truly pronounced word-initially (even then it often becomes /d͡ʒ/), where it is otherwise /ɪ/ or /i/.

=== Tone ===
Unusually for an Indo-Aryan language, Punjabi distinguishes lexical tones. Two are distinguished in Punjabi: falling and rising. These are tone contours, but are often mislabelled as "low" and "high" tones, and sometimes as "high-falling" and "low-rising", although there is no evidence that Punjabi tones begin or end at a consistent pitch. About 75% of Punjabi words have no rising or falling tone, and this absence of tone is described with a third label called “level” tone. The transcriptions and tone annotations in the examples below are based on those provided in Punjabi University, Patiala's Punjabi-English Dictionary.

Examples		Pronunciation			Meaning
Gurmukhi	Shahmukhi	Transliteration	IPA	Tone	Meaning
ਘਰ	گھر	ghar	/kə̀.rᵊ/ (Note: Standard or Eastern dialect. Pakistani Majhi and Western dialects usually pronounce it as /käː˨ɾᵊ/.)	falling	house
ਕਰ੍ਹਾ	کرھا	karhā	/kə́.ra/	rising	powdered remains of cow-dung cakes
ਕਰ	کر	kar	/kər/	level	do, doing
ਝੜ	جھڑ	jhaṛ	/t͡ʃə̀.ɽᵊ/	falling	shade caused by clouds
ਚੜ੍ਹ	چڑھ	chaṛh	/t͡ʃə́.ɽᵊ/	rising	rise to fame, ascendancy
ਚੜ	چڑ	caṛ	/t͡ʃəɽ/	level	hangnail

There are some words which are said to have rising tone in the first syllable and falling in the second (some writers describe this as a fourth tone). However, an acoustic study of six Punjabi speakers in the United States found no evidence of a separate falling tone following a medial consonant.

- ਮੋਢਾ / موڈھا, móḍà (rising-falling), "shoulder"

Some Punjabi distinct tones for gh, jh, ḍh, dh, bh

It is considered that these tones arose when voiced aspirated consonants (gh, jh, ḍh, dh, bh) lost their aspiration.

==== Mechanics ====
In Punjabi, tone is induced by the loss of [h] in tonal consonants. Tonal consonants are any voiced aspirates /ʱ/ and the voiced glottal fricative /ɦ/. These include the five voiced aspirated plosives bh, dh, ḍh, jh and gh (which are represented by their own letters in Gurmukhi), the h consonant itself and any voiced consonants appended with [h] (Gurmukhi:੍ਹ "perī̃ hāhā", Shahmukhi: ھ "dō-caśmī hē"); usually ṛh, mh, nh, rh and lh.

- Tonal consonants induce a rising tone (also called "high tone") before them or a falling tone (also called "low tone") after them.
  - E.g. kaḍḍh > káḍḍ "remove", he > è "is"
- Tone is always induced onto the stressed syllable of a word.
  - E.g. paṛhāī > paṛā̀ī "study", mōḍhā > mṓḍā "shoulder"

The five tonal plosives also become voiceless word-initially. E.g. ghar > kàr "house", ḍhōl > ṭṑl "drum" etc.

Tonogenesis in Punjabi forfeits the sound of [h] for tone. Thus, the more [h] is realised, the less "tonal" a word will be pronounced, and vice versa. Tone is sometimes withheld when words are spoken emphatically or on their own as a form of identification.

Sequences with the consonant h have some additional gimmicks:

- The sequences ih, uh, ahi and ahu change into the vowels /eː˩˥/, /oː˩˥/, /ɛː˩˥/ and /ɔː˩˥/ respectively and acquire a rising tone.
  - E.g. muhrā > mṓrā "chessman", rahiṇ > réṇ "stay"
- In the stressed sequence ah, the vowel lengthens (ā) and acquires a rising tone /aː˩˥/.
  - E.g. qahvā > qā́vā "coffee", dah > dā́ "ten"
- In the final unstressed sequence ah, the vowel becomes nasalised and long (ā̃).
  - E.g. bā́rah > bā́rā̃ "twelve", tárah > tárā̃ "way"
- When h is preceded by a short vowel, proceeded by a long vowel and the latter is stressed, the former vowel becomes weak or blends into the latter.
  - E.g. pahāṛ > păā̀ṛ /pə̯aː˥˩.ɽə̆/ "mountain", tuhāḍā > tŭā̀ḍā /tʊ̯aː˥˩ɖ.ɖaː/ "your"

The consonant h on its own is now silent or very weakly pronounced except word-initially. However, certain dialects which exert stronger tone, particularly more northern Punjabi varieties and Dogri, pronounce h as very faint (thus tonal) in all cases. E.g. hatth > àtth.

The Jhangvi and Shahpuri dialects of Punjabi (as they transition into Saraiki) show comparatively less realisation of tone than other Punjabi varieties, and do not induce the devoicing of the main five tonal consonants (bh, dh, ḍh, jh, gh).

The Gurmukhi script which was developed in the 16th century has separate letters for voiced aspirated sounds, so it is thought that the change in pronunciation of the consonants and development of tones may have taken place since that time.

Some other languages in Pakistan have also been found to have tonal distinctions, including Burushaski, Gujari, Hindko, Kalami, Shina, and Torwali, though these (besides Hindko) seem to be independent of Punjabi.

=== Gemination ===
Gemination of a consonant (doubling the letter) is indicated with adhak in Gurmukhi and tashdīd in Shahmukhi. Its inscription with a unique diacritic is a distinct feature of Gurmukhi compared to Brahmic scripts.

All consonants except six (ṇ, ṛ, h, r, v, y) are regularly geminated. The latter four are only geminated in loan words from other languages. (Note: /jː/ is found in one other instance, for the name of the Gurmukhi letter ਯ (yayyā ਯੱਯਾ))

There is a tendency to irregularly geminate consonants which follow long vowels, except in the final syllable of a word, e.g.menū̃ > mennū̃. (Note: This never occurs with /ɳ/ and /ɽ/, and is rare before /ʋ, ɾ, ɦ/) It also causes the long vowels to shorten but remain peripheral, distinguishing them from the central vowels /ə, ɪ, ʊ/. This gemination is less prominent than the literarily regular gemination represented by the diacritics mentioned above.

Before a non-final prenasalised consonant, (Note: bindī/ṭippī or nūn ġunna before a consonant often causes it to be pre-nasalised, except where there is a true nasal vowel.) long vowels undergo the same change but no gemination occurs.

The true gemination of a consonant after a long vowel is unheard of but is written in some English loanwords to indicate short /ɛ/ and /ɔ/, e.g. ਡੈੱਡ ڈَیڈّ /ɖɛɖː/ "dead".

== Grammar ==
The 35 traditional characters of the Gurmukhi script

Punjabi has a canonical word order of SOV (subject–object–verb). Function words are largely postpositions marking grammatical case on a preceding nominal.

Punjabi distinguishes two genders, two numbers, and six cases, direct, oblique, vocative, ablative, locative, and instrumental. The ablative occurs only in the singular, in free variation with oblique case plus ablative postposition, and the locative and instrumental are usually confined to set adverbial expressions.

Adjectives, when declinable, are marked for the gender, number, and case of the nouns they qualify. There is also a T-V distinction. Upon the inflectional case is built a system of particles known as postpositions, which parallel English's prepositions. It is their use with a noun or verb that is what necessitates the noun or verb taking the oblique case, and it is with them that the locus of grammatical function or "case-marking" then lies. The Punjabi verbal system is largely structured around a combination of aspect and tense/mood. Like the nominal system, the Punjabi verb takes a single inflectional suffix, and is often followed by successive layers of elements like auxiliary verbs and postpositions to the right of the lexical base.

== Vocabulary ==
Being an Indo-Aryan language, the core vocabulary of Punjabi is derived from two categories of Sanskrit borrowings. Tadbhav, which are Sanskrit words that evolved naturally through the Apabhramsa dialects of regional Prakrits languages into Old Punjabi. Tatsama, which are direct borrowings from Sanskrit with pronunciation adapted to Punjabi phonetics. Tatsama is more common in literature, religious texts, and academic texts.

Pakistani Punjabi borrows more from Urdu, Persian, and Arabic, from Urdu's lingua franca and Islamic cultural influences on the language. Whereas Indian Punjabi, with its influence from the Hindu language and religion, has more borrowings from Hindi and Sanskrit, as well as older and regional Persian and Arabic borrowings of its own.

== Writing systems ==
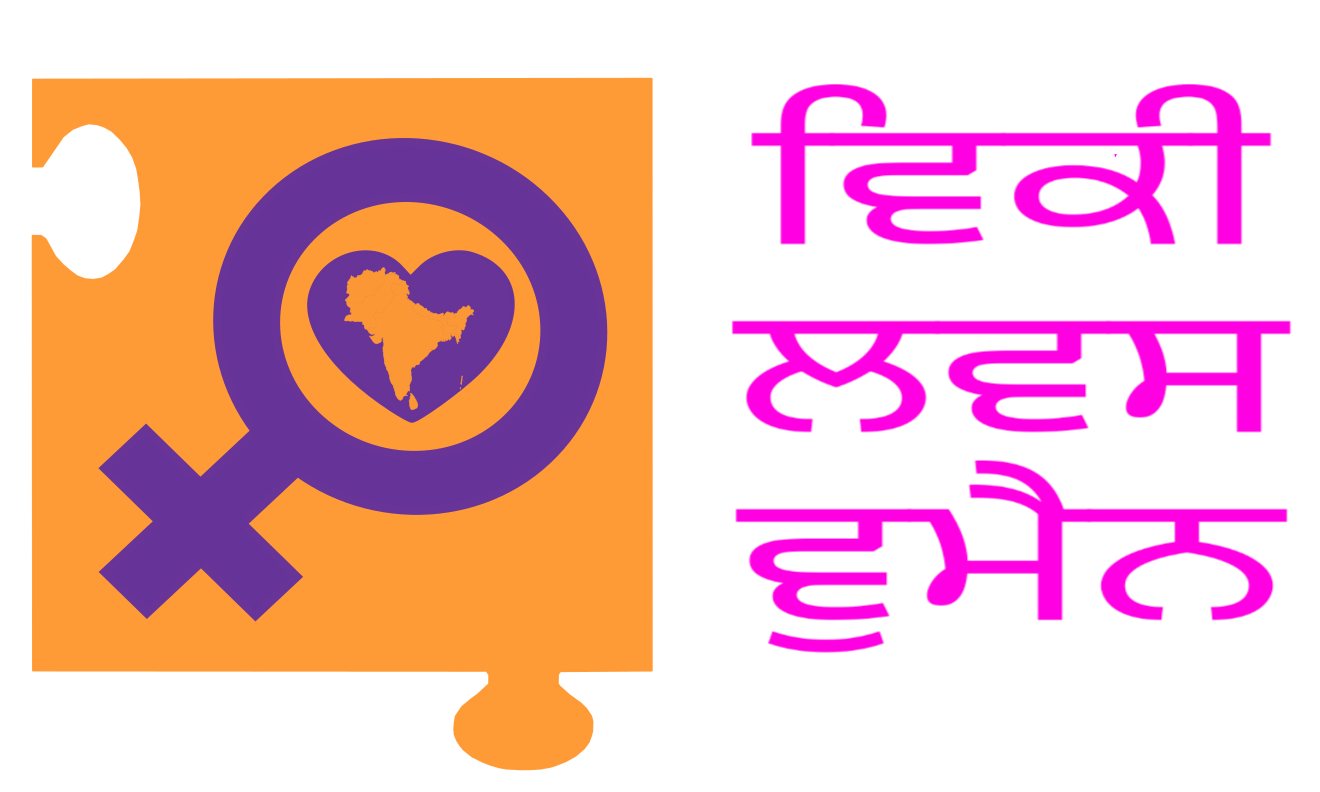
Gurmukhi writing system on a sample logo

The Punjabi language is written in multiple scripts (a phenomenon known as synchronic digraphia). Each of the major scripts currently in use is typically associated with a particular religious group, although the association is not absolute or exclusive. In India, Punjabi Sikhs use Gurmukhi, a script of the Brahmic family, which has official status in the state of Punjab. In Pakistan, Punjabi Muslims use Shahmukhi, a variant of the Perso-Arabic script and closely related to the Urdu alphabet. Sometimes Punjabi is recorded in the Devanagari script in India, albeit rarely. The Punjabi Hindus in India had a preference for Devanagari, another Brahmic script also used for Hindi, and in the first decades since independence raised objections to the uniform adoption of Gurmukhi in the state of Punjab, but most have now switched to Gurmukhi and so the use of Devanagari is rare. Often in literature, Pakistani Punjabi (written in Shahmukhi) is referred as Western-Punjabi (or West-Punjabi) and Indian Punjabi (written in Gurmukhi) is referred as Eastern-Punjabi (or East-Punjabi), although the underlying language is the same with a very slight shift in vocabulary towards Islamic and Sikh words respectively.

The written standard for Shahmukhi also slightly differs from that of Gurmukhi, as it is used for western dialects, whereas Gurumukhi is used to write eastern dialects.

Historically, various local Brahmic scripts including Laṇḍā and its descendants were also in use.

The Punjabi Braille is used by the visually impaired. There is an altered version of IAST often used for Punjabi in which the diphthongs ai and au are written as e and o, and the long vowels e and o are written as ē and ō.

== Sample text ==
This sample text was adapted from the Punjabi Wikipedia article on Lahore.

=== Gurmukhi ===
ਲਹੌਰ ਪਾਕਿਸਤਾਨੀ ਪੰਜਾਬ ਦੀ ਰਾਜਧਾਨੀ ਹੈ। ਲੋਕ ਗਿਣਤੀ ਦੇ ਨਾਲ਼ ਕਰਾਚੀ ਤੋਂ ਬਾਅਦ ਲਹੌਰ ਦੂਜਾ ਸਭ ਤੋਂ ਵੱਡਾ ਸ਼ਹਿਰ ਹੈ। ਲਹੌਰ ਪਾਕਿਸਤਾਨ ਦਾ ਸਿਆਸੀ, ਕਾਰੋਬਾਰੀ ਅਤੇ ਪੜ੍ਹਾਈ ਦਾ ਗੜ੍ਹ ਹੈ ਅਤੇ ਇਸੇ ਲਈ ਇਹਨੂੰ ਪਾਕਿਸਤਾਨ ਦਾ ਦਿਲ ਵੀ ਕਿਹਾ ਜਾਂਦਾ ਹੈ। ਲਹੌਰ ਰਾਵੀ ਦਰਿਆ ਦੇ ਕੰਢੇ ’ਤੇ ਵੱਸਦਾ ਹੈ। ਇਸਦੀ ਲੋਕ ਗਿਣਤੀ ਇੱਕ ਕਰੋੜ ਦੇ ਨੇੜੇ ਹੈ।

=== Shahmukhi ===
لہور پاکستانی پنجاب دی راجدھانی ہے۔ لوک گݨتی دے نالؕ کراچی توں بعد لہور دوجا سبھ توں وڈا شہر ہے۔ لہور پاکستان دا سیاسی، رہتلی کاروباری اتے پڑھائی دا گڑھ ہے اتے، ایسے لئی ایہنوں پاکستان دا دل وی کہا جاندا ہے۔ لہور راوی دریا دے کنڈھے تے وسدا ہے۔ ایسدی لوک گݨتی اک کروڑ دے نیڑے ہے۔

==== Transliteration ====
Lahaur Pākistānī Panjāb dī rājtā̀ni ài. Lok giṇtī de nāḷ Karācī tõ bāad Lahaur dūjā sáb tõ vaḍḍā šáir ài. Lahaur Pākistān dā siāsī, kārobāri ate paṛā̀ī dā gáṛ ài te ise laī ínū̃ Pākistān dā dil vī kihā jāndā ài. Lahaur Rāvī dariā de káṇḍè te vassdā ài. Isdī lok giṇtī ikk karoṛ de neṛe ài.

==== IPA ====
/lɐɔ̂ːɾᵊ paˑkˑɪ̽sᵊˈtaˑnˑi pɐɲˈd͡ʒaːbᵊ di ɾaːd͡ʒᵊ ˈd̥âˑnˑi ɛ̂ ‖ loːkᵊ ˈɡɪɳᵊti de naːɭᵊ kɐ̆ɾaˑt͡ʃˑi tõ bǎːdᵊ lɐɔ̂ːɾᵊ duˑd͡ʒˑa sɐ̌bᵊ tõ ʋɐɖːa ʃɛ̌ːɾᵊ ɛ̂ ‖ lɐɔ̂ːɾᵊ paˑkˑɪ̽sᵊˈtaːnᵊ da sɐ̆ˈjaˑsˑi | kaːɾoˈbaːɾi ˈɐte pɐ̆ˈɽâːi da ɡɐ̌ɽᵊ ɛ̂ ˈɐte ˈɪse lɐi ˈěːnˑũ paˑkˑɪ̽sᵊˈtaːnᵊ da dɪlᵊ ʋi kɛ̌ːja d͡ʒaːnda ɛ̂ ‖ lɐɔ̂ːɾᵊ ˈɾaːʋi ˈdɐɾɐ̆ja de kɐ̌ɳɖe te ʋɐsːᵊda ɛ̂ ‖ ɪsᵊ di loːkᵊ ˈɡɪɳᵊti ɪkːᵊ kɐ̆ɾoːɽᵊ de neːɽe ɛ̂ ‖/

=== Translation ===
Lahore is the capital city of Pakistani Punjab. After Karachi, Lahore is the second largest city. Lahore is Pakistan's political, cultural, and educational hub, and so it is also said to be the heart of Pakistan. Lahore lies on the bank of the Ravi River. Its population is close to ten million people.

== Literature development ==
=== Medieval period ===
- Fariduddin Ganjshakar (1179–1266) is generally recognised as the first major poet of the Punjabi language. Roughly from the 12th century to the 19th century, many great Sufi saints and poets preached in the Punjabi language, the most prominent being Bulleh Shah. Punjabi Sufi poetry also developed under Shah Hussain (1538–1599), Sultan Bahu (1630–1691), Shah Sharaf (1640–1724), Ali Haider (1690–1785), Waris Shah (1722–1798), Saleh Muhammad Safoori (1747–1826), Mian Muhammad Baksh (1830–1907) and Khwaja Ghulam Farid (1845–1901).
- The Sikh religion originated in the 15th century in the Punjab region and Punjabi is the predominant language spoken by Sikhs. Most portions of the Guru Granth Sahib use the Punjabi language written in Gurmukhi, though Punjabi is not the only language used in Sikh scriptures.

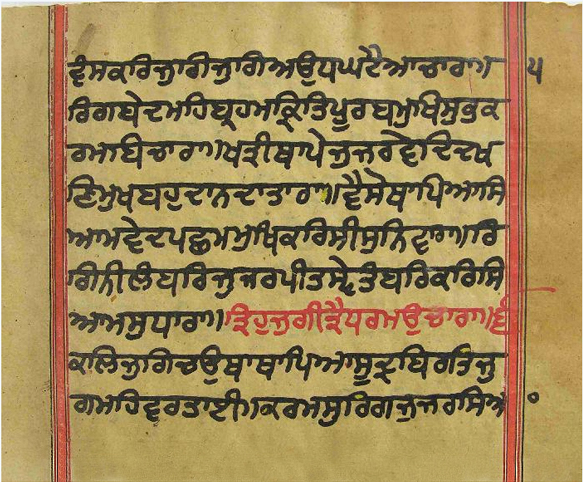
Varan Gyan Ratnavali by 16th-century historian Bhai Gurdas.

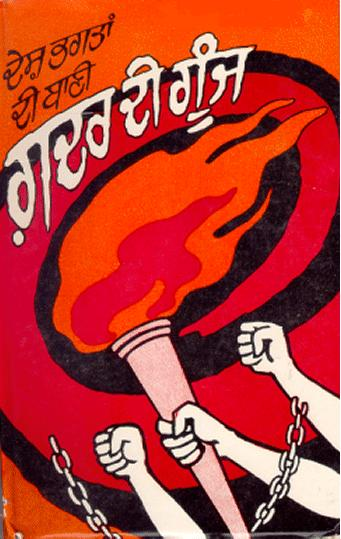
Ghadar di Gunj 1913, newspaper in Punjabi of Ghadar Party, US-based Indian revolutionary party.

The Janamsakhis, stories on the life and legend of Guru Nanak (1469–1539), are early examples of Punjabi prose literature.

- The Punjabi language is famous for its rich literature of qisse, most of which are about love, passion, betrayal, sacrifice, social values and a common man's revolt against a larger system. The qissa of Heer Ranjha by Waris Shah (1706–1798) is among the most popular of Punjabi qissas. Other popular stories include Sohni Mahiwal by Fazal Shah, Mirza Sahiban by Hafiz Barkhudar (1658–1707), Sassui Punnhun by Hashim Shah (c. 1735–c. 1843), and Qissa Puran Bhagat by Qadaryar (1802–1892).
- Heroic ballads known as Vaar enjoy a rich oral tradition in Punjabi. Famous Vaars are Chandi di Var (1666–1708), Nadir Shah Di Vaar by Najabat and the Jangnama of Shah Mohammad (1780–1862).

=== Colonial period ===
The Victorian novel, Elizabethan drama, free verse and Modernism entered Punjabi literature through the introduction of British education during the Raj. Nanak Singh (1897–1971), Vir Singh, Ishwar Nanda, Amrita Pritam (1919–2005), Puran Singh (1881–1931), Dhani Ram Chatrik (1876–1957), Diwan Singh (1897–1944) and Ustad Daman (1911–1984), Mohan Singh (1905–78) and Shareef Kunjahi are some legendary Punjabi writers of this period.

=== Modern period ===
After independence of Pakistan and India, Najm Hossein Syed, Fakhar Zaman and Afzal Ahsan Randhawa, Shafqat Tanvir Mirza, Ahmad Salim, and Najm Hosain Syed, Munir Niazi, Ali Arshad Mir, Pir Hadi Abdul Mannan enriched Punjabi literature in Pakistan, whereas Jaswant Singh Kanwal (1919–2020), Amrita Pritam (1919–2005), Jaswant Singh Rahi (1930–1996), Shiv Kumar Batalvi (1936–1973), Surjit Patar (1944–) and Pash (1950–1988) are some of the more prominent poets and writers from India.

== Status ==
Despite Punjabi's rich literary history, it was not until 1947 that it would be recognised as an official language. Previous governments in the area of the Punjab had favoured Persian, Hindustani, or even earlier standardised versions of local registers as the language of the court or government. After the annexation of the Sikh Empire by the British East India Company following the Second Anglo-Sikh War in 1849, the British policy of establishing a uniform language for administration was expanded into the Punjab. The British Empire employed Urdu in its administration of North-Central and Northwestern India, while in the North-East of India, Bengali language was used as the language of administration. Despite its lack of official sanction, the Punjabi language continued to flourish as an instrument of cultural production, with rich literary traditions continuing until modern times. The Sikh religion, with its Gurmukhi script, played a special role in standardising and providing education in the language via gurdwaras, while writers of all religions continued to produce poetry, prose, and literature in the language. Ethnologue classifies the language's status as EGIDS 4 (Institutional).

=== In Pakistan ===
The proportion of people with Punjabi as their mother tongue in each Pakistani District as of the 2017 Pakistan Census

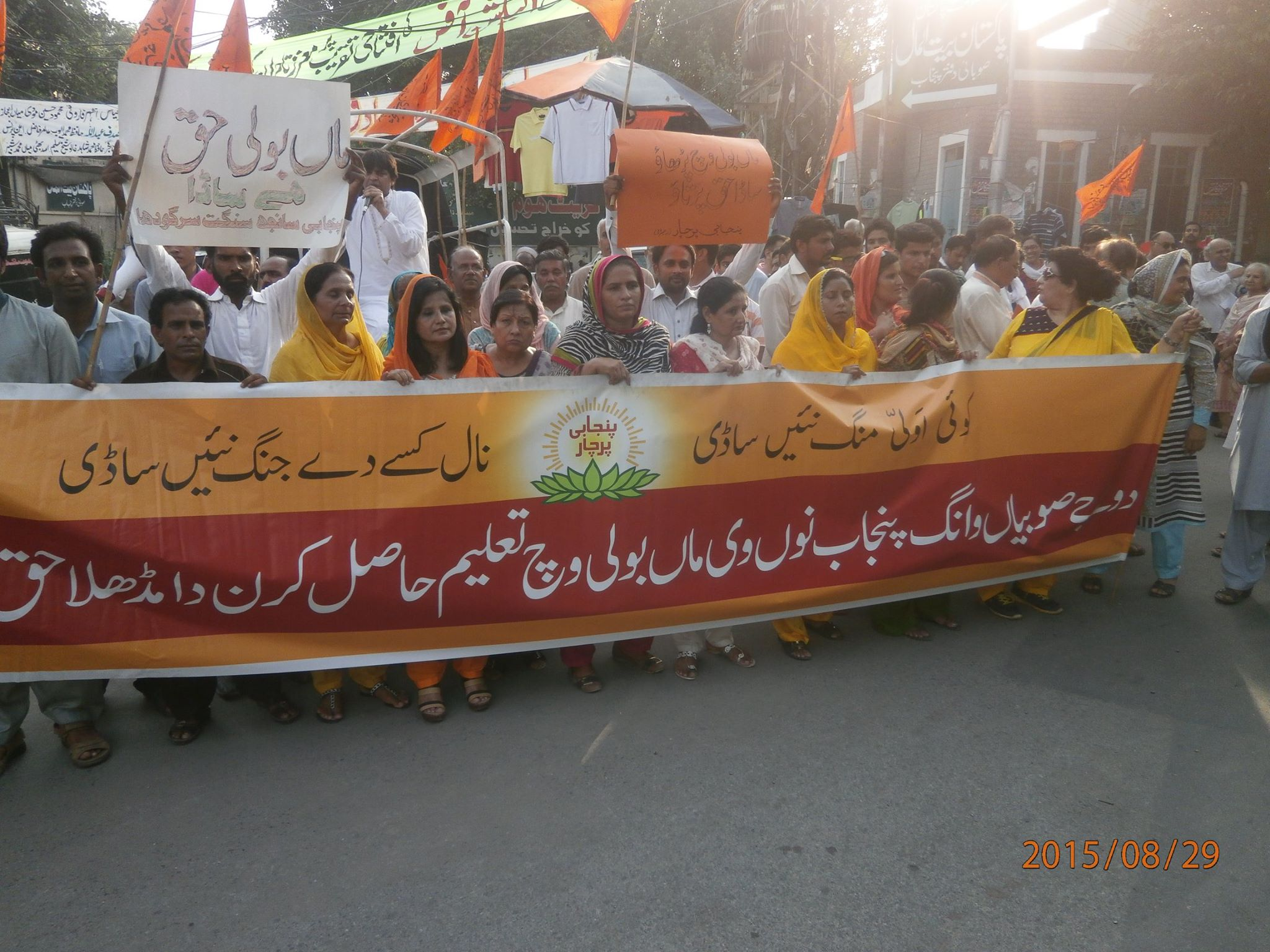
A demonstration by Punjabis at Lahore, Pakistan, demanding to make Punjabi as official language of instruction in schools in Punjab

In 1908, Mian Shafi, a Muslim elite, opposed Prof. Mukherjee's comment that Punjabi should become the provincial language of the British province of Punjab, refuting that the language of Muslims was Urdu. Jinnah opposed Motilal Nehru's 1928 proposal that every province should have its own language alongside the Hindustani language as the national language, with Jinnah stating that Urdu was the language of Muslims in a communication to Jawaharlal Nehru. Liaqat Ali Khan opposed a 1937 proposal by Gandhi to deliver free education to children in their mother tongue.

When Pakistan was created in 1947, despite Punjabi being the majority language in West Pakistan and Bengali the majority in East Pakistan and Pakistan as whole, English and Urdu were chosen as the official languages. The selection of Urdu was due to its association with South Asian Muslim nationalism and because the leaders of the new nation wanted a unifying national language instead of promoting one ethnic group's language over another, due to this the Punjabi elites started identifying with Urdu more than Punjabi because they saw it as a unifying force on an ethnoreligious perspective. Broadcasting in Punjabi language by Pakistan Broadcasting Corporation decreased on TV and radio after 1947. Article 251 of the Constitution of Pakistan declares that these two languages would be the only official languages at the national level, while provincial governments would be allowed to make provisions for the use of other languages. However, in the 1950s the constitution was amended to include the Bengali language.

Punjabi is not a language of instruction for primary or secondary school students in Punjab Province (unlike Sindhi and Pashto in other provinces). Pupils in secondary schools can choose the language as an elective, while Punjabi instruction or study remains rare in higher education. One notable example is the teaching of Punjabi language and literature by the University of the Punjab in Lahore which began in 1970 with the establishment of its Punjabi Department.

In the cultural sphere, there are many books, plays, and songs being written or produced in the Punjabi-language in Pakistan. Until the 1970s, there were a large number of Punjabi-language films being produced by the Lollywood film industry, however since then Urdu has become a much more dominant language in film production. Additionally, television channels in Punjab Province (centred on the Lahore area) are broadcast in Urdu. The preeminence of Urdu in both broadcasting and the Lollywood film industry is seen by critics as being detrimental to the health of the language. Zia-ul Haq banned three works promoting the Punjabi language. Until the early 1990s, members of the Punjab Assembly were forbidden to address the house in Punjabi. However, this ban was lifted by Hanif Ramay yet was re-instated shortly after.

The use of Urdu and English as the near-exclusive languages of broadcasting, the public sector, and formal education have led some to fear that Punjabi in Pakistan is being relegated to a low-status language and that it is being denied an environment where it can flourish. Several prominent educational leaders, researchers, and social commentators have echoed the opinion that the intentional promotion of Urdu and the continued denial of any official sanction or recognition of the Punjabi language amounts to a process of "Urdu-isation" that is detrimental to the health of the Punjabi language In August 2015, the Pakistan Academy of Letters, International Writer's Council (IWC) and World Punjabi Congress (WPC) organised the Khawaja Farid Conference and demanded that a Punjabi-language university should be established in Lahore and that Punjabi language should be declared as the medium of instruction at the primary level. In September 2015, a case was filed in Supreme Court of Pakistan against Government of Punjab, Pakistan as it did not take any step to implement the Punjabi language in the province. Additionally, several thousand Punjabis gather in Lahore every year on International Mother Language Day. Thinktanks, political organisations, cultural projects, and individuals also demand authorities at the national and provincial level to promote the use of the language in the public and official spheres.

Despite being the most-widely spoken language in Pakistan, the language is in decline. The Punjabi language's decline in Pakistan has been attributed to various causes, such as lack of official recognition, lack of prestige, promotion of Urdu and English, to dispell fears of Punjabi domination by ethnic minorities, and other factors. The language has been relegated to informal communication, also as a means for crude humour, abuse, and to connect with uneducated masses. Parents who speak Punjabi opt to only communicate to their children in Urdu or English, with Punjabi being seen as paindu (shorthand for "backwardness" or "uneducated"). In June 2024, the Punjab Assembly passed a resolution to allow lawmakers to communicate in Punjabi. In October 2024, the Punjab province's assembly passed a resolution to make Punjabi an official subject across more sectors of the education system as a compulsory subject. In March 2024, Maryam Nawaz announced the introduction of Punjabi as a subject in schools. In November 2025, Maryam Nawaz again pushed for the inclusion of Punjabi language education in Pakistan's educational institutions. There is currently a Punjabi language revitalisation movement in Pakistan.

In Pakistan, no regional ethnic language has been granted official status at the national level, and as such Punjabi is not an official language at the national level, even though it is the most spoken language in Pakistan. It is widely spoken in Punjab, Pakistan, the second largest and the most populous province of Pakistan, as well as in Islamabad Capital Territory. The only two official languages in Pakistan are Urdu and English. In Pakistani Punjab, Punjabi is mostly used in informal settings. Language shift is occurring toward English and Urdu (especially amongst among upper-class and higher social-status families), which have a higher perceieved social prestige associated with them while Punjabi is considered paindu ("yokel"). Punjabi is not taught in lower levels of the Pakistani Punjabi education system, however it is an optional course at the high school, college, and university levels. The decline of Punjabi is especially prevalent in urban areas. Khokhlova (2014) considered Pakistani Punjabi to be "endangered majority language" due to a lack of official recognition for the language. Hussain cautions against such a conclusion and recommends further research to assess the status of Punjabi and its dialects.

=== In India ===
The Indian National Congress' annual open session of 1920, as per Motilal Nehru’s report of 1928, committed to organise states on a linguistic basis. However, Punjabi, Sindhi and Urdu were not considered for statehood. Since January 1948 after meeting B.R. Ambedkar, the Sikhs advocated for a Punjabi Suba. This was carried out by the Akali Dal in 1953 requesting the establishment of a Punjabi-speaking state to the States Reorganisation Commission, which declined the proposal and stated that Punjabi was not a distinct language. The commission stated:

The Hindus as a whole, it is argued, have never accepted Punjabi as their medium of expression, to the exclusion of Hindi, because while at home they speak the Punjabi language, in their religious ceremonies and festivals, in their schools and colleges, they use Hindi. In any case, they have never accepted the Gurmukhi script.

— Justice S. Fazl Ali, Report of the States Reorganization Committee (1955), p. 142

Hukam Singh and Giani Kartar Singh perceieved this as discrimination, including on a religious basis, due to the role that Punjabi and Gurmukhi plays in Sikhism. The Sachar Commission (1949) suggested to make Punjabi the medium of instruction till matriculation in Punjabi-speaking areas while Hindi was to be a compulsorary subject while in Hindi-speaking areas of the state, the reverse was suggested by the commission. Rather than solving the linguistic divide, this suggestion exacerbated it. Both Punjabi and Hindi were made official mediums of instructions in schools in 1948. However, Panjab University and the Municipal Committee of Jalandhar declined the use of Punjabi owing to Arya Samaji influence. The Jan Sangh and Arya Samaj requested Hindus to declare Hindi as their mother-tongue in the 1951, 1961, and 1971 censuses. Baath and Takhar claim the Green Revolution led to a declining prestige and opinion on the Punjabi language amongst the population due to brain-drain and environmental issues.

Within India, Punjabi is used in official, formal, informal, and religious settings. In India, Punjabi is one of the 22 scheduled languages of India enshrined in the Indian constitution. It is the first official language of the Indian State of Punjab. Punjabi also has second language official status in Delhi along with Urdu, and in Haryana. At the federal level, Punjabi has official status via the Eighth Schedule to the Indian Constitution, earned after the Punjabi Suba movement of the 1950s. At the state level, Punjabi is the sole official language of the state of Punjab, while it has secondary official status in the states of Haryana and Delhi. In 2012, it was also made additional official language of West Bengal in areas where the population exceeds 10% of a particular block, sub-division or district. Both union and state laws specify the use of Punjabi in the field of education. The state of Punjab uses the Three Language Formula, and Punjabi is required to be either the medium of instruction, or one of the three languages learnt in all schools in Punjab. Punjabi is also a compulsory language in Haryana, and other states with a significant Punjabi speaking minority are required to offer Punjabi medium education. The Panjab Official Language Act of 1967 made Panjabi, written in Gurmukhi script, as Punjab state's official language, mandating all legislative documents to be published in Panjabi within the state. The act was amended in 2008 to mandate that Punjabi be the administrative language for the official work of civil and criminal courts under the Panjab and Haryana High Court, and administrative departments of the state government, including schools, offices, and universities. It also introduced provisional penalties for officers for non-compliance. In 2022 another amendment was made to allow fines for non-compliance with the act. Despite this act and its amendments, enforcement of it is lax due to flaws and ambiguities. For example, public signs are sometimes not properly displayed in Punjabi, rather being Gurmukhi transliterations of Hindi words rather than Punjabi ones. Despite the Punjab Learning of Panjabi and Other Languages Act, 2008, and its 2021 amendment declaring that Punjabi language be taught in all schools from class 1–10, in-reality through formal and unformal rules some schools in Punjab ban the usage of Punjabi. This was documented to be occurring in both private and public schools by I. P. Singh. Passing a Punjabi language test is now required by the Punjab government for officer-grade posts.

There are vibrant Punjabi language movie and news industries in India, however Punjabi serials have had a much smaller presence within the last few decades in television up to 2015 due to market forces. Despite Punjabi having far greater official recognition in India, where the Punjabi language is officially admitted in all necessary social functions, while in Pakistan it is used only in a few radio and TV programs, attitudes of the English-educated elite towards the language are ambivalent as they are in neighbouring Pakistan. There are also claims of state apathy towards the language in non-Punjabi majority areas like Haryana and Delhi.

Despite legal protections, Punjabi's usage in India is declining amongst the youth owing to factors related to employment, social acceptability, and class status. In urban areas, Punjabi's status is more precarious. Joga Singh of Director of the Centre for Diaspora Studies at Punjabi University Patiala classified Punjabi's status as "endangered" by using the criteria of UNESCO's 2003 report on Language Vitality and Endangerment, claiming that outside of Indian Punjab, Punjabi will become extinct within the next few decades while being at "significant risk" within Indian Punjab. However, UNESCO’s list of endangered languages does not include Punjabi. In 2021, the Central Board of Secondary Education relegated Panjabi to a minor language status due to a declining interest of students studying the language. Issues related to the vitality of the language are declining lexical stock, lesser amounts of speakers, and decreasing interest in the language by youth. Furthermore, the Punjabi-speaking population is in natural decline due to demographic shift. English is favoured over Punjabi in socio-educational spheres. Within Punjab, a linguistic shift is underway toward English (especially in Hoshiarpur, Ludhiana, Pathankot, and Jalandhar amongst the youth) due to the higher perceieved social-status and scientific/educational vitality of the latter, with English being seen as having more prestige and giving off a more educated and respected impression (attributed by Baath and Takhar to linguistic and cultural alienation due to former colonisation). Linguistic affiliation is somewhat related to religious affiliation in some aspects. Hindi newspapers are more prevalent in circulation in Punjab than Punjabi ones, as per Priyadarshi Dutta they are tailored for a Hindu readership. K. David Harrison states that while Punjabi Sikh religious identity is strongly tied to the Punjabi language, this is less the case for Punjabi Hindus, who do not tie their religion to the Punjabi language to the same degree. Hindi is preferred in commercial and business settings rather than Punjabi owing to feelings related to modernity and class dynamics. Furthermore, in some families children reply in Hindi to their parents despite the latter speaking Punjabi. Punjabi remains especially prevalent in Malwa (as per Mohinderpal Singh of Patiala) and Gurdaspur and Amritsar (both associated with Sikh history and religious learning). Meanwhile, Punjabi is waning more in Ludhiana, Jalandhar, and Hoshiarpur, owing to a larger population having had settled abroad and a declining youth population.

In 2026, controversy arose after the Army Public Schools in Punjab made Sanskrit a compulsory subject and Punjabi an optional one. The apparatus for teaching the Punjabi language in the state's educational system has been described as lacking. The State of Punjab faces a shortage of Punjabi language teachers, with students increasingly failing the subject. Reasons attributed to declining Punjabi proficiency is a lack of digital content in the language and the view that it is not helpful for securing employment. The lack of employment opportunities in the state has been attributed by R. S. Ghuman to a lack of public and private sector investment. Furthermore, the quality of private university degrees in the state is of questionable quality, leading to low utility for job-hunting and that both public and private curricula in educational institutions are outdated.

=== Diaspora ===
In the Punjabi diaspora, the language tends to be lost overtime due to succeeding diasporic generations shifting to other languages.

== Linguistic development, research, and management ==
=== Linguistic study ===
Academic study of the Punjabi language is traced back to the efforts of Christian missionaries and colonial administrators. Some early academics or researchers include the likes of Carey (1812), Beames (1872, 1875), Wilson (1899), Bailey (1904, 1914, 1926), and Grierson (1916). The Linguistic Survey of India (completed in 1927) overseen by George A. Grierson conducted research onto Punjabi and Lahnda, however its linguistic veracity is questionable as per S. N. Gajendragadkar due to its data collection and processing being by the colonial establishment (including by un-trained patwaris) rather than linguists. However, despite this it was a foundational work in the field of Punjabi linguistics. Later the Oriental College, Lahore offered Punjabi courses in Romanisation and Gurmukhi in Vidwan, Budhiman, and Gyani.

Post-independence in India, Punjabi's inclusion in the Eighth Schedule allowed for government-sponsored research into the language. Punjab University, the only university in the state after independence shifted to Shimla and then Chandigarh. In the mid-1950s due to the influence of the Summer Schools in Linguistics, Pune, scholars began applying more Western linguistic methods toward the study of Punjabi, such as Bahl (1957, based upon the method of K. L. Pike) on the language's tonality. Piara Singh Padam investigated the history of the Punjabi language in his 1954 book on the subject. A conferrence of Vice-Chancellors and Linguists in Pune in 1959 stressed the need for a newer Punjabi linguistic survey using up to date linguistic methodology and tools. The governments of Punjab State and PEPSU invested in the development of the language in order to use it for administration and education, especially after the reorganisation of Punjab in 1966. Universities and other educational institutions sponsored and conducted linguistic research into the language in the following period. Various aspects of the language were investigated, such as its history, classification, phonetics, phonology, pedagogy, morphology, lexicography, script, syntax, socio-linguistics, and stylistics. Many of the linguistic works from the 1960s onwards covered tonality (as it is a rather unique feature of Punjabi in regards to Indo-Aryan languages) or analyzed specific dialects. Names of some later scholars who published research on Punjabi include Jain (1934), Bahl (1957, 1969), Gill (1960, 1962), Arun (1961), Gleason (1962), Vatuk (1964), Clivio (1966), Singh (1971), Bhatia (1975, 1993), Grainger (1980), Tolstaya (1981), Sandhu (1986), Dulai (1989), Malik (1995), Shackle (2003), Dhillon (2010), Bowden (2012), Kanwal & Ritchart (2015), Hussain (2015, 2017, 2019), Bhardwaj (2016), Evans (2018), Kochetov (2019), and Bashir & Conners (2019). A number of theses and dissertations have been conducted on Punjabi linguistics.

A major undertaking was the compilation of The Linguistic Atlas of the Punjab (1972), which began in 1968 and was completed by a team of scholars. The survey was published by Punjabi University. It was the largest such study on Punjabi since the earlier Linguistic Survey of India in the early 20th century. One of the first comparative studies involving Punjabi was one done in 1975 by Baldev Raj Gupta regarding Punjabi and Tamil. A Japanese scholar named Tomio Mizokami also conducted linguistic research into Punjabi. In 1980, a phonetic reader on Punjabi was published by The Northern Regional Language Centre (NRLC) of the Central Institute of Indian Languages (CIIL). Pákha Sanjam is a bilinguual English and Punjabi periodical dedicated to Punjabi linguistics. Natural Language Processing (NLP) resources for Punjabi were prepared by Punjabi University.

=== Governmental academies and institutes ===
Various institutions published academic literature on the language in both India and Pakistan, especially by Punjabi departments of universities. In India specifically, various educational institues produce research and publications on the language, with the prominent ones being namely Panjab University (Chandigarh, Department of Punjabi and Department of Punjabi Lexicography,), Punjabi University (Patiala, various departments), Kurukshetra University (Kurukshetra, Department of Punjabi), Guru Nanak Dev University (Amritsar, School of Punjabi Studies), and Jammu University (Jammu, Department of Punjabi). Other educational institutions include: Central University of Himachal Pradesh (Department of Punjabi and Dogri), CT University (Department of Punjabi), Eternal University (Department of Punjabi), Guru Kashi University (Department of Punjabi), Lovely Professional University (Department of Punjabi), RIMT University (Department of Punjabi), Central University of Punjab (Department of Punjabi), Sri Guru Granth Sahib World University (Department of Punjabi), Tantia University (Department of Punjabi), and University of Delhi (Department of Punjabi). State government bodies include the Language Department and the Department of Education of the Government of Punjab, India and the Punjab State Text Book Board, Chandigarh. Two further bodies include the Punjabi Munch, Delhi Sahitya Kala Parisad on Asaf Ali Road, Delhi and the Western Regional Language Centre (C.I.I.L., Mysore) in Patiala.

The Punjabi Sahit Academy, Ludhiana, established in 1954 is supported by the Punjab state government and works exclusively for promotion of the Punjabi language, as does the Punjabi academy in Delhi. The Jammu and Kashmir academy of art, culture and literature in Jammu and Kashmir UT, India works for Punjabi and other regional languages like Urdu, Dogri, Gojri etc. Institutions in neighbouring states as well as in Lahore, Pakistan also advocate for the language.

Punjabi University was established on 30 April 1962, and is only the second university in the world to be named after a language, after Hebrew University of Jerusalem. The university actively promotes the Punjabi language. The university has a number of departments covering various aspects of the language, such as the Department of Punjabi, the Department of Linguistics and Punjabi Lexicography, , the Encyclopaedia Department, and the Department of History and Punjab Studies. The Research Centre for Punjabi Language Technology, Punjabi University, Patiala is working for development of core technologies for Punjabi, Digitisation of basic materials, online Punjabi teaching, developing software for office use in Punjabi, providing common platform to Punjabi cyber community. Punjabipedia, an online encyclopaedia was also launched by Patiala university in 2014.

The Dhahan Prize was created to award literary works produced in Punjabi around the world. The Prize encourages new writing by awarding $25,000 CDN annually to one "best book of fiction" published in either of the two Punjabi scripts, Gurmukhi or Shahmukhi. Two second prizes of $5,000 CDN are also awarded, with the provision that both scripts are represented among the three winners. The Dhahan Prize is awarded by Canada India Education Society (CIES).

Punjabi Sahit Academy, Ludhiana, 1954

Punjabi Academy, Delhi, 1981–1982

Jammu and Kashmir Academy of Art, Culture and Literature

Punjab Institute of Language, Art and Culture, Lahore, 2004

=== Software ===
- Software is available for the Punjabi language on almost all platforms. This software is mainly in the Gurmukhi script. Nowadays, nearly all Punjabi newspapers, magazines, journals, and periodicals are composed on computers via various Punjabi software programmes, the most widespread of which is InPage Desktop Publishing package. Microsoft has included Punjabi language support in all the new versions of Windows and both Windows Vista, Microsoft Office 2007, 2010 and 2013, are available in Punjabi through the Language Interface Pack support. Most Linux Desktop distributions allow the easy installation of Punjabi support and translations as well. Apple implemented the Punjabi language keyboard across Mobile devices. Google also provides many applications in Punjabi, like Google Search, Google Translate and Google Punjabi Input Tools.

== Demographics ==
In 1916 and 1919 respectively, the LSI estimated (including dialects) that eastern Punjabi was spoken by 12,564,139 people while western Punjabi was spoken by 7,779,138 people. Presently, Punjabi is spoken by over 100 million people, making it the 10th most spoken language. According to Qandeel Hussain (2020), Western Punjabi is spoken by 92,721,700 people while Eastern Punjabi is spoken by 29,258,970 people.

== Gallery ==
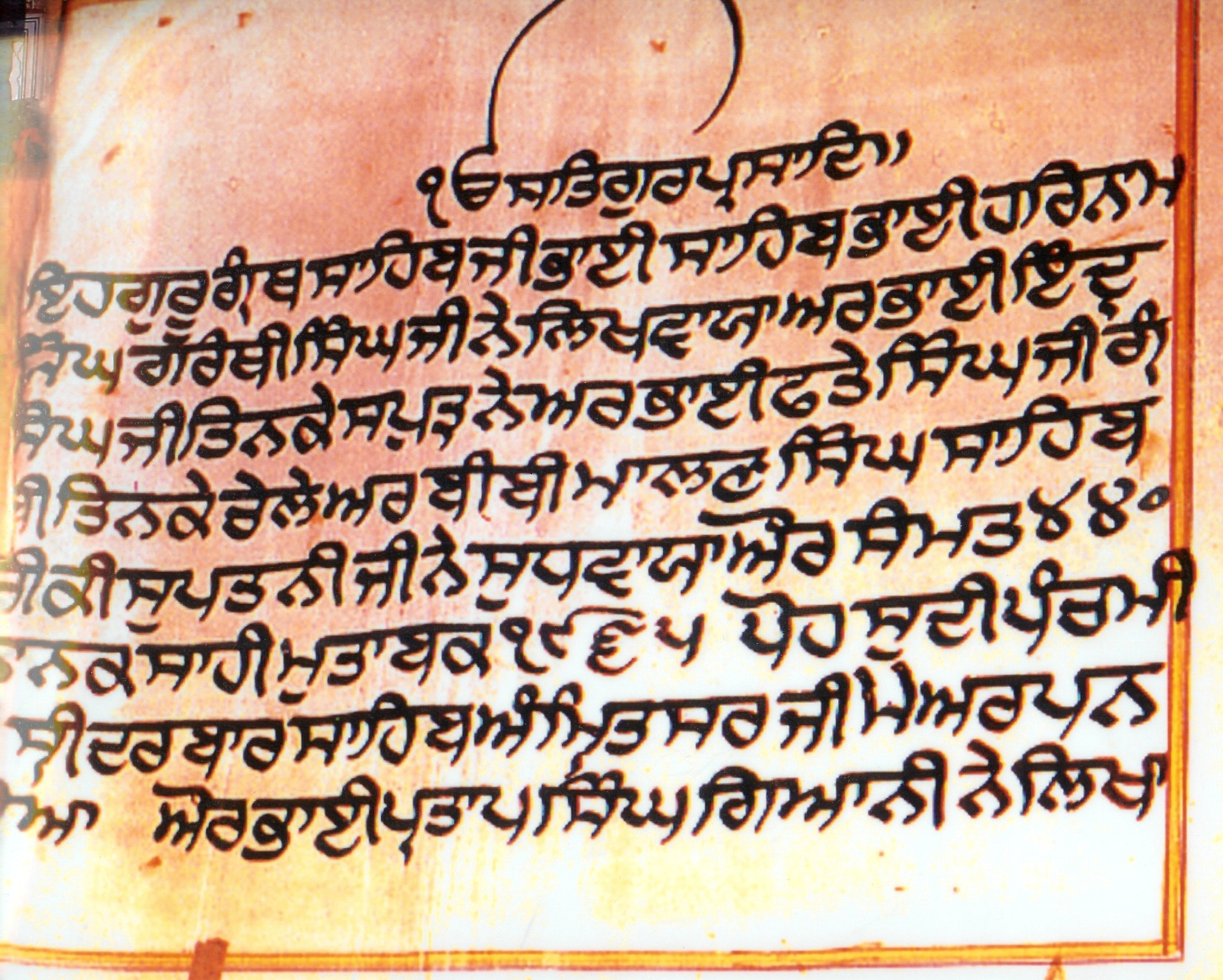
Guru Granth Sahib in Gurmukhi

Punjabi Gurmukhi script

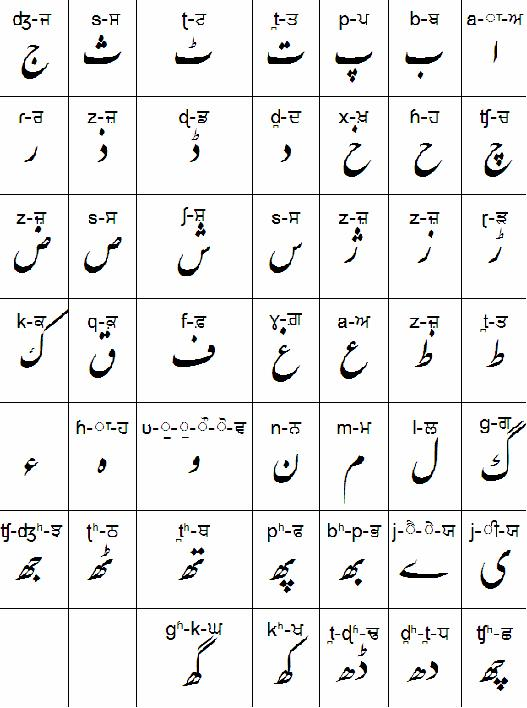
Punjabi Shahmukhi script

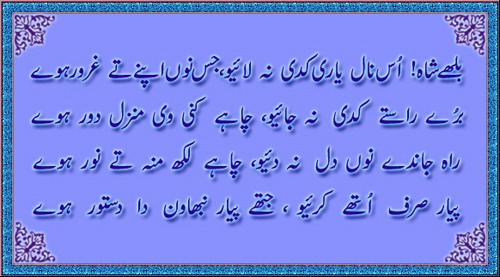
Bulleh Shah poetry in Punjabi (Shahmukhi script)

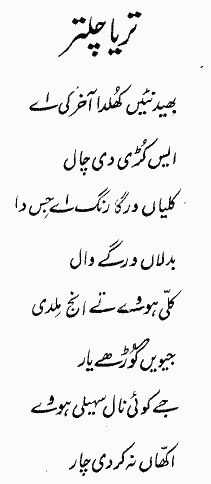
Munir Niazi poetry in Punjabi (Shahmukhi script)

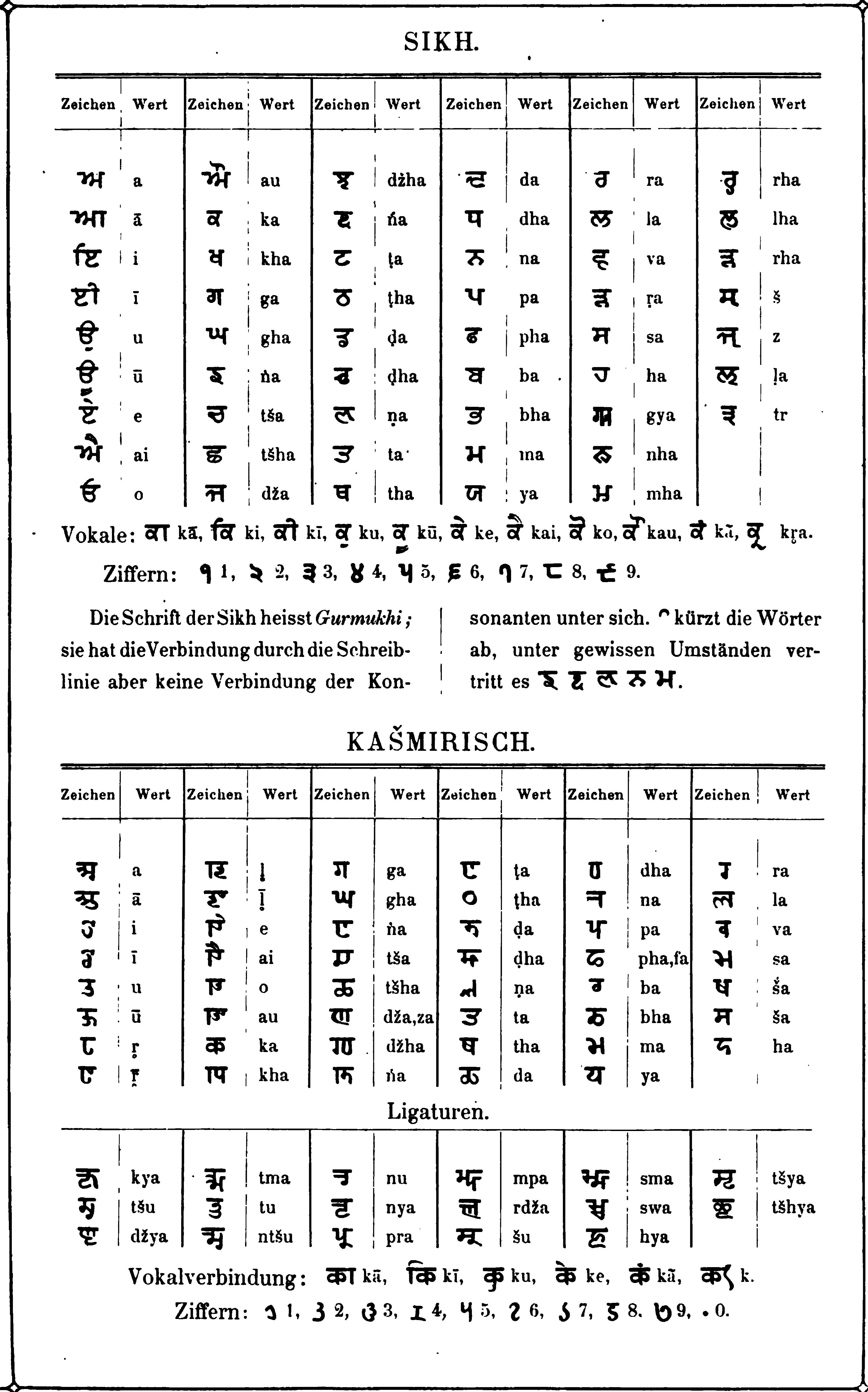
Gurmukhi alphabet

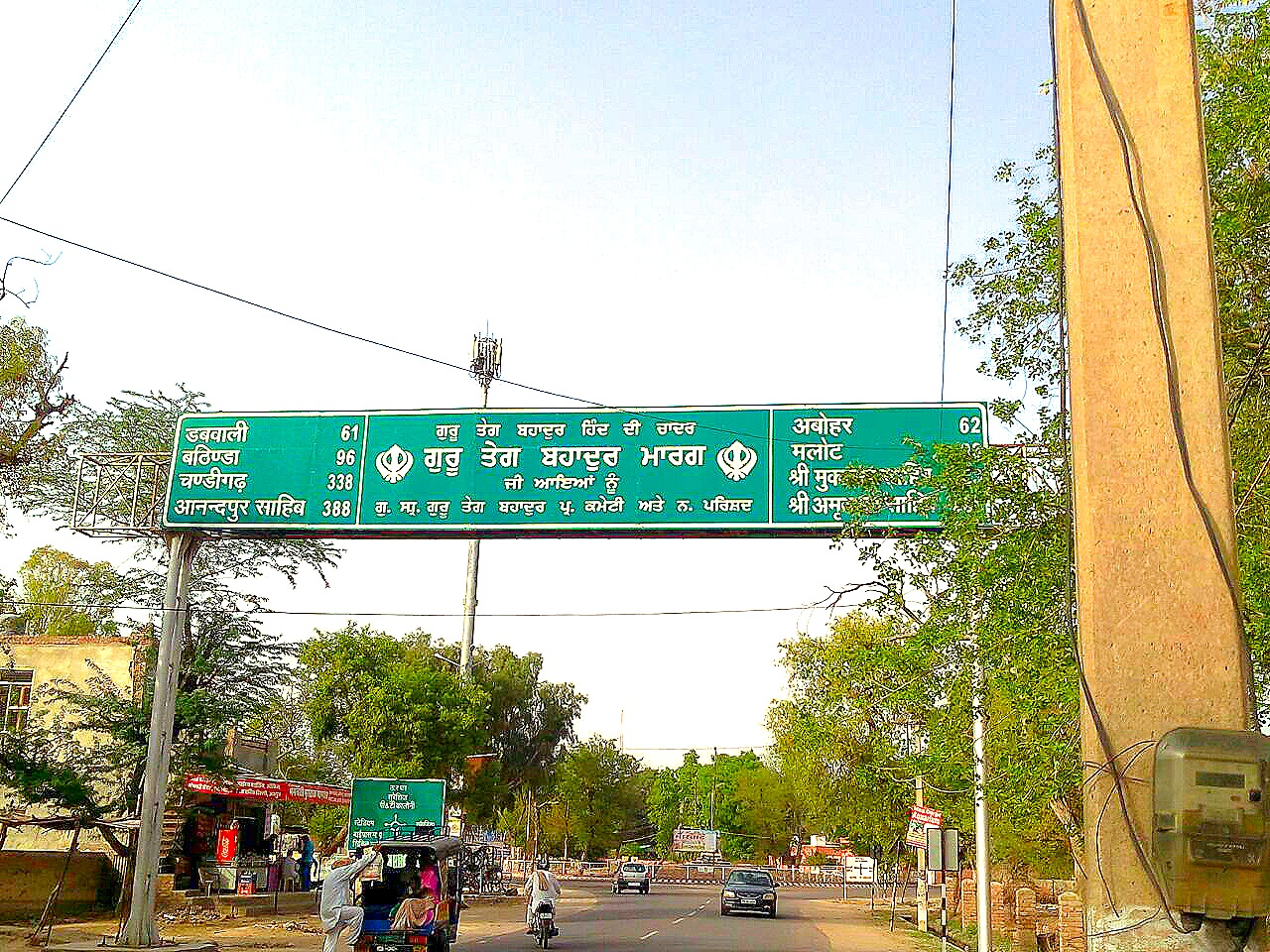
A sign board in Punjabi language along with Hindi at Hanumangarh, Rajasthan, India

== See also ==
- Bhangra (music) – Type of popular music associated with Punjabi culture
- Khalsa bole – coded language of Nihang Sikhs largely based on Punjabi
- List of Punjabi-language newspapers
- Punjabi cinema
- Punjabi Language Movement
