= Khalsa bole =

Coded language of Nihang Sikhs

- gaṛgajjă bole, nihaṅgă siṅghă de bole, khālsā de bole
- ਖਾਲਸਈ ਬੋਲੇ, ਖਾਲਸਾ ਬੋਲੀ, ਗੜਗੱਜ ਬੋਲੇ
- Pronunciation: khālăsaī bōlē, khālăsā bōlī
- Era: Early 18th century–present
- Language family: Indo-European: Indo-Iranian; Indo-Aryan; Northwestern; Punjabi; Khalsa bole
- Early forms: Proto-Indo-European: Proto-Indo-Iranian; Proto-Indo-Aryan; Vedic Sanskrit; Classical Sanskrit; debated Prakrit (Note: Paishachi, Saurasheni, or Gandhari Prakrits have been proposed as the ancestor Middle Indo-Aryan language to Punjabi.); debated Apabhraṃśa; Old Punjabi
- Writing system: Gurmukhi
- Sources: Punjabi and its dialects (mostly), Old Hindi, Persian

Language codes
- ISO 639-3: –

Khalsa bole (Gurmukhi: ਖਾਲਸਈ ਬੋਲੇ or ਖਾਲਸਾ ਬੋਲੀ; khālăsaī bōlē, khālăsā bōlī; meaning "words of Khalsa"; alternatively transcribed as Khalsa boli) is a bravado-based language variety developed and spoken by members of the Akali-Nihang sect of Sikhism. It has also been described as a coded language. Sant Singh Sekhon describes the lect as a "grandiloquent patois" that "comprises euphemisms and jargon symbolic of high-spirited confidence and courage". The Nihangs use certain vocabulary with distinct semantics.

== Names ==
Other common names for the lect are gaṛgajjă bole (ਗੜਗੱਜ ਬੋਲੇ; meaning "words that thunder"), nihaṅgă siṅghă de bole ("words of the Nihang Sikhs"), nihaṅgă bolā ("Nihang speak"), and Khalsā de bole ("words of the Khalsa").

== Purpose ==
The dialect encompasses the Sikh philosophical concept of remaining ever optimistic, known as Chardi kala. The unique dialect serves martial and mental objectives, such as helping the speaker and listeners remain in high-spirits in the face of adversity. It serves as a verbal act of dissent in the face of troubling circumstances.

"There is a great degree of general Sikh ambivalence towards the Nihangs and their deras. There is no real knowledge but through the construction of the Sikh past by ragis and dhadis and others involved in the invention of Sikh tradition, they seem to have made sacrifices for the faith and qaum. One possible consequence of their relative isolation could be the development of coded language. Sekhon (1997: 229) attributes these different meanings of the words as metaphors of optimism and belief in the inevitable achievement of the goal: 'Taking a meal of parched gram of necessity a Nihang would describe himself as eating almonds. Even now onions for Nihangs are silver pieces, rupees on the other hand mere pebbles, and a club the repository of wisdom.’ "

— Pashaura Singh, Louis E. Fenech, The Oxford Handbook of Sikh Studies (2014), page 380

An account of Khalsa bole published in 1903 is as follows:

"One branch of them [Nihangs] will never use a word of the feminine gender, and others will add the word Singh or lion -the distinctive suffix of Sikh names) [sic] after almost every substantive they use. The Akáli is full of memories of the glorious days of the Khálsa: he is nothing if not a soldier-a soldier of the Guru. He dreams of armies, and he think in lakhs [hundred of thousands]. Often if an Akáli wishes to imply that five of his order are present, he will say 'Five lakhs are before you'; or if he would explain that he is alone, he will say that he is with 'one and a quarter lakhs of the Khálsa.' You ask him how he is, and he replies that 'the army is well'; you enquire where he has come from, and he says, ' The troops marched from Lahore.' At the end of his prayers he shouts. 'Sat Srí Akál' ('God the Immortal is True') as loud as he can, and if he is given money to buy 'karah parshad and requested to do so', he utters this Jaikára or cry of victory, as it is called."

— Guide to the Darbar Sahib or Golden Temple of Amritsar (1903), page 34

== History ==
=== Origin ===
Some claim it was invented by Banda Singh Bahadur, the early 18th century Sikh general and martyr. particularly within the 50-year period following a Mughal edict on 10 December 1710. The dialect developed during the period of intense persecution of the Sikhs by the Mughal and Durrani empires in the 18th century. During that period, Sikhs vacated for the mountains, jungles, and deserts to escape the genocidal policies enacted against them.

"Guru Gobind Singh would rename some of the smaller or weaker Singhs in the ranks of the Khalsa Army. He would bestow them with lofty titles such as ‘Dharti-Hallaa Singh' (literally, the Earth-shaker). This would not only send fear and doubt deep within the ranks of the enemy soldiers, but encouraged the Singhs in the Khalsa Army to fight heroically with courage and confidence and honour the names given to them by the Guru."

— Nihang Darshan Singh, audio recording, July 2006

Jasbir Singh Sarna claims the language variety evolved during the time-period of Nawab Kapur Singh. Piara Singh Padam claims it originated in the 18th century.

The Nihangs developed the special vocabulary full of euphemisms and parallels to common words and phrases to complement their martial role and character. The terms were used by Nihangs to "make light of hardships", to describe enemies in a bold and provocative manner, and to belittle/ridicule things of worldly comfort. Khalsai Bole encapsulates the core aspects of the Nihang way of life: self-respect, wisdom, aesthetics, and fearlessness.

=== Present-day ===
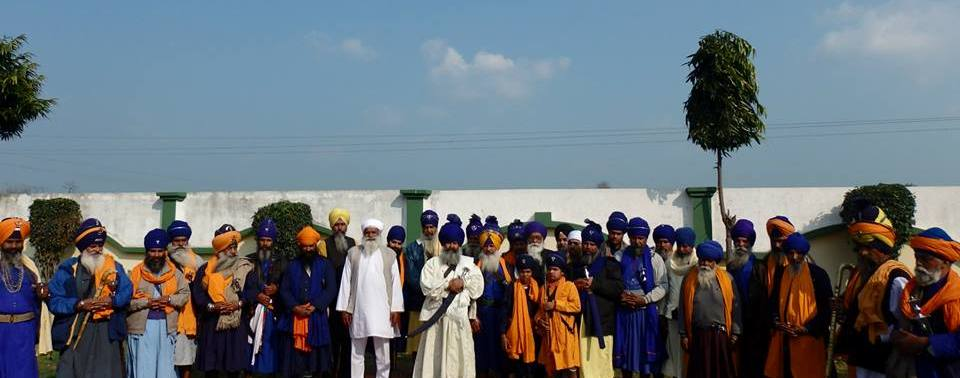
Group of Nihang Sikhs

The dialect is still used by some modern Sikhs, especially the Akali-Nihangs. Nihangs still employ Khalsa Bole in their encampments and also when they talk to members of the general public. The Khalsa Bole used by Nihangs today with the public are for the purpose of comedy but also secrecy. The euphemisms used by the Nihangs can be interpreted as derogatory.

Many modern Nihangs are ridiculed for using their dialect. They are often the target for jokes by outsiders. While many of the terms of Khalsa Bole have been forgotten and lost, new ones continue to be coined, referring to modern concepts.

"As a result of this brave spirit, there grew up among the Sikhs a peculiar slang, which is called the Vocabulary of Heroes. In it the things connected with the difficulties of life were expressed in terms of such cheerfulness and bravado, as if, for the Sikhs pain and suffering had lost all meaning....
"There is a superb humor in all this, which breathes a full and healthy spirit. It shows that our ancestors knew, how much better than we do at present, that religion is not incompatible with brightness and vigour."

— Teja Singh, Humour In Sikhism (1929), page 34

== Linguistic sources ==
Khalsa bole sources its vocabulary from "a mixture of Punjabi, Old Hindi, Persian and other dialects used in various regions of India".

== List of vocabulary examples ==
Khalsa bole words and phrases with figurative and literal meanings
Word or phrase	Literal meaning	Khālsā bole meaning
adālatīā ਅਦਾਲਤੀਆ	judge	winnowing basket ਛੱਜ
aflātūn ਅਫਲਾਤੂਨ	eccentric, braggart	quilt ਰਜਾਈ, ਲੇਫ
aflātūnī ਅਫਲਾਤੂਨੀ	eccentric, braggart	mattress or light quilt ਤੁਲਾਈ
āhū lāhuṇe ਆਹੂ ਲਾਹੁਣੇ	an idiom, literally "to take off gazelles"	to commit a great massacre ਘੱਲੂਘਾਰਾ ਕਰਨਾ, ਕੱਟ ਵੱਢ, ਵੱਢ ਟੁੱਕ
airāvata,airāpati ਐਰਾਵਤ, ਐਰਾਪਤਿ	legendary elephant	he-buffalo ਝੋਟਾ
akal dān ਅਕਲ ਦਾਨ	dispenser/repository of wisdom	wooden club; a baton ਸੋਟਾ, ਡੰਡਾ
akāl bāṅgā ਅਕਾਲ ਬਾਂਗਾ	timeless call	victory cry 'ਸਤਿ ਸ੍ਰੀ ਅਕਾਲ' ਦਾ ਜਕਾਰਾ
akāl buṅgā ਅਕਾਲ ਬੁੰਗਾ	"timeless dwelling," former name of the Akal Takht	Akal Takht ਅਕਾਲ ਤਖਤ
akālī ਅਕਾਲੀ	of the timeless/deathless	fearless Sikh, Nihang Singh ਕਾਲ ਦੇ ਭੌ ਬਾਝੋਂ ਸਿਖ, ਅਕਾਲ ਦਾ ਉਪਾਸ਼ਕ, ਨੀਲਾ ਬਾਣਾ ਧਾਰੀ/ਨੀਲੰਬਰਧਾਰੀ ਨਿਹੰਗ ਸਿੰਘ
ākkaṛbhannă ਆਕੜਭੰਨ	that which shatters arrogance	disease, especially fever, bodily illness ਬੁਖਾਰ, ਰੋਗ, ਬਿਮਾਰੀ
akāśparī ਅਕਾਸ਼ਪਰੀ	sky fairy, fairy of heaven	she-goat ਬੱਕਰੀ
akāsī dīvā ਅਕਾਸੀ ਦੀਵਾ	celestial lamp	sun or moon, ਸੂਰਜ, ਚੰਨ
akāsī faujăgaibī faujă ਅਕਾਸੀ ਫੌਜ, ਗੈਬੀ ਫੌਜ	celestial army, hidden army	martyred army ਸ਼ਹੀਦੀ ਫ਼ੌਜ, ਗੈਬੀ ਦਲ, ਸ਼ਹੀਦਾਂ ਦੀ ਗੁੱਝੀ ਫੌਜ, ਸ਼ਹੀਦੀ ਸਿੰਘ
ākkī hoṇā ਆਕੀ ਹੋਣਾ	to be a rebel	to go to jail ਬੰਦੀ ਖਾਨੇ ਪੈਣਾ, ਹਵਾਲਾਤ ਵਿੱਚ ਪੈਣਾ, ਜੇਲ੍ਹ ਜਾਣਾ ਜਾਂ ਵਿੱਚ ਹੋਣਾ
ammrit vellā ਅੰਮ੍ਰਿਤ ਵੇਲਾ	ambrosial hour	predawn ਤੜਕਾ, ਤੜਕਸਾਰ, ਮੂੰਹ ਹਨੇਰਾ, ਪ੍ਰਾਤਹਕਾਲ, ਭੁਨਸਾਰ
ammritī ਅਮਰਤੀ, ਅੰਮ੍ਰਿਤੀ	name of sweetmeat, "ambrosial"	broth of gram flour ਕੜ੍ਹੀ, ਸਲੂਣੀ
ammritīā ਅੰਮ੍ਰਿਤੀਆ	of the Amrit	one who has undergone Amrit Sanskar ਜਿਨ ਖੰਡੇ ਦਾ ਅੰਮ੍ਰਿਤ ਛਕਿਐ
anamatīā ਅਨਮਤੀਆ	follower of another religion	non-Sikh ਸਿੱਖ ਧਰਮ ਨੂੰ ਨਾ ਮੰਨਣ ਵਾਲਾ, ਸਿੰਘ ਧਰਮ ਤੋਂ ਭਿੰਨ ਧਰਮ ਧਾਰਨ ਵਾਲਾ
anandă ਅਨੰਦ	happiness	Sikh wedding ਸਿੱਖ ਧਰਮ ਅਨੁਸਾਰ ਵਿਆਹ
āṇḍe ਆਂਡੇ	eggs	potatoes ਆਲੂ
anhat śabad ਅਨਹਤ ਸ਼ਬਦ	sourceless sound	snore ਘੁਰਾੜਾ
aṅgă saṅgă ਅੰਗ ਸੰਗ	ever-present, always accompanying	God ਕਰਤਾਰ, ਵਾਹਿਗੁਰੂ
aṅgīṭṭhā ਅੰਗੀਠਾ	fireplace	funeral pyre ਸਿਵਾ, ਚਿਖਾ
añjanī ਅੰਜਨੀ	antimony powder	night ਰਾਤ
annhā ਅੰਨ੍ਹਾ	blind	idol worshipper ਮੂਰਤੀ ਪੂਜਕ
arākkā, rākkā, arākkī, irākkī ਅਰਾਕਾ, ਰਾਕਾ, ਅਰਾਕੀ, ਇਰਾਕੀ	Arabian horse, thoroughbred from Iraq, literally "Iraqi"	stallion of poor quality ਮਾੜਾ ਘੌੜਾ, ਟੱਟੂ
arākkaṇ ਅਰਾਕਣ	Arabian horse, thoroughbred from Iraq, literally "female Iraqi"	mare equivalent of arākkā ਘੌੜੀ, ਟੈਰ, ਟੈਰਾ
āṛband ਆੜਬੰਦ	garment wrapped around waist and groin	loincloth ਲੰਗੋਟਾ
ardāsā ਅਰਦਾਸਾ	great prayer	prayer ਪ੍ਰਾਰਥਣਾ
ardāsā sodhaṇā ਅਰਦਾਸਾ ਸੋਧਣਾ	to lustrate a great prayer	prayer performed when commencing or concluding a task ਕਿਸੇ ਕੰਮ ਦੇ ਆਰੰਭ ਜਾਂ ਸਮਾਪਤੀ ਤੇ ਕਰਤਾਰ ਅੱਗੇ ਬੇਨਤੀ, ਪ੍ਰਾਰਥਨਾ ਕਰਨੀ
ardāsīā ਅਰਦਾਸੀਆ	Sikh prayer leader ਅਰਦਾਸ ਕਰਨ ਵਾਲਾ ਸਿੰਘ	
aṛiṅgă baṛiṅgă ਅੜਿੰਗ ਬੜਿੰਗ	wrestling ਘੋਲ, ਛਿੰਝ	lying down, sleeping ਲੇਟਵਾਂ, ਸੁੱਤਾ
asvārā ਅਸਵਾਰਾ	rider	the Guru Granth Sahib, or departure to the next world ਸ੍ਰੀ ਗੁਰੂ ਗਰੰਥ ਸਾਹਿਬ ਜੀ ਦੀ ਬੀੜ, ਕੂਚ, ਪ੍ਰਸਥਾਨ
asvārā karnā ਅਸਵਾਰਾ ਕਰਨਾ	to ascend an incline	to pass away ਚੜ੍ਹਾਈ ਕਰਨਾ, ਸੁਰਗ ਬਾਸ ਹੌਣਾ, ਕੂਚ ਕਰਨਾ, ਪ੍ਰਲੋਕ ਗਮਨ
asvārā sāhib prakāsăṇā ਅਸਵਾਰਾ ਸਾਹਿਬ ਪ੍ਰਕਾਸਨਾ	to bring forth the esteemed rider	to unwrap and open the Guru Granth Sahib ਸ੍ਰੀ ਗੁਰੂ ਗ੍ਰੰਥ ਸਾਹਿਬ ਜੀ ਦਾ ਰੁਮਾਲ ਖੋਲ੍ਹ ਕੇ ਪ੍ਰਕਾਸ਼ ਕਰਨਾ।
athakkă ਅੱਥਕ	tireless	emaciated pony ਮਰੀਅਲ, ਦੁਬਲਾ ਟੱਟੂ, ਹਾਰਿਆ ਹੋਇਆ ਘੋੜਾ
athakkă savārī ਅਥੱਕ ਸਵਾਰੀ	tireless mount	pair of shoes or slippers ਜੁੱਤੀ, ਜੋੜਾ
atī akhaṇḍă pāṭh ਅਤੀ ਅਖੰਡ ਪਾਠ	extreme Akhand Path recitation	a full recitation of the Guru Granth Sahib done by one reciter within 8 or 9, instead of 13 to 16, 3-hour periods ਅਖੰਡ ਪਾਠ ਜਿਹਨੂੰ ਇਕੱਲਾ ਪਾਠੀਆ ਇੱਕੋ ਥਾਏਂ ਬੈਠ ਕੇ ਲਗਾਤਾਰ ਕਰਦਿਆਂ ਅੱਠ-ਨੌਂ ਪਹਿਰੀਂ ਨਬੇੜੇ।
atī akhaṇḍă pāṭṭhī ਅਤੀ ਅਖੰਡ ਪਾਠੀ	extreme Akhand Path performer	one who performs the above ਅਤੀ ਅਖੰਡ ਪਾਠ ਕਰਨ ਵਾਲਾ
babbarū ਬੱਬਰੂ	a type of puri	bread leavened with yeast ਖਮੀਰੀ ਰੋਟੀ
badāmă ਬਦਾਮ	almonds	chickpeas, gram, parched gram ਭੁੱਜੇ ਛੋਲੇ, ਚਣੇ
badāṇā ਬਦਾਣਾ	mulberry, a type of sweet	fruit of Capparis decidua, ripe or unripe ਕਰੀਰ ਦਾ ਫਲ, ਡੇਲੇ
bahiśtī ਬਹਿਸ਼ਤੀ	heavenly	water-carrier, deaf ਮਾਸ਼ਕੀ, ਬੋਲ਼ਾ
bahuguṇā ਬਹੁਗੁਣਾ	of many qualities	a type of flower ਗੰਦਾਲਾ
bājă ਬਾਜ	hawk	a trowel, scraper ਖੁਰਪਾ, ਰੰਬਾ
bālī faujă ਬਾਲੀ ਫੌਜ	woman troop	girls ਕੂੜੀਆਂ
bāmmhaṇă ਬਾਮ੍ਹਣ	Brahmin	pippal tree, Ficus religiosa ਪਿੱਪਲ
bāmmhaṇī ਬਾਮ੍ਹਣੀ	female Brahmin	rice pudding, kheer ਖੀਰ, ਤਸਮਈ
basantă kaur ਬਸੰਤ ਕੌਰ	a woman's name, "Spring Kaur" "spring damsel"	corn, maize ਮੱਕੀ
basantară ਬਸੰਤਰ	a great fire	fire ਅੱਗ
basāvā ਬਸਾਵਾ		a tava, cooking pan ਤਵਾ
baṭerā, ikk ṭaṅgī baṭerā ਬਟੇਰਾ, ਇੱਕ ਟੰਗੀ ਬਟੇਰਾ	quail, partridge, one-legged quail	eggplant ਵੈਂਗਣ, ਬਤਾਉਂ
bāṭṭā ਬਾਟਾ	iron bowl ਸਰਬਲੋਹ ਦਾ ਕੌਲਾ	
bāṭṭe dā sānjhī ਬਾਟੇ ਦਾ ਸਾਂਝੀ	shareholder of the iron bowl	an initiated Sikh ਅੰਮ੍ਰਿਤਧਾਰੀ ਖਾਲਸਾ
bhagāutī ਭਗਉਤੀ	sword ਤਲਵਾਰ, ਖੜਗ	
bhājjā ਭਾਜਾ	derivative of bhaji	vegetables, often fried ਸਬਜੀ, ਤਰਕਾਰੀ
bhāṇā ਭਾਣਾ	will, especially God's	God's will ਰੱਬੀ ਹੁਕਮ
bhartharī ਭਰਥਰੀ	a mythical king	bull ਢੱਟਾ, ਸਾਨ੍ਹ
bhoiṅsūr ਭੋਇੰਸੁਰ	soil pig	turnip ਗੋਂਗਲੂ/ਸ਼ਲਗਮ
bhujaṅgībhuchanger ਭੁਜੰਗੀ	snake	son, youngster ਸਿੰਘਾਂ ਦਾ ਮੁੰਡਾ, ਬਾਲ, ਬਾਲਾ
bhūtanī ਭੂਤਨੀ	female ghost, witch	locomotive, dust storm, last cart of a train ਰੇਲ ਇੰਞਣ, ਹਨੇਰੀ, ਰੇਲ ਦੀ ਆਖਰੀ ਗੱਡੀ
bhuṭerā ਭੁਟੇਰਾ	a ball of flour parched in fire ਅੱਗ ਵਿੱਚ ਭੂੰਨਿਆ ਆਟੇ ਦਾ ਪਿੰਨਾ	
bemuhārī ਬੇਮੁਹਾਰੀ	uncontrolled	train engine ਰੇਲ ਗੱਡੀ
bemuhtājī ਬੇਮੁਹਤਾਜੀ	independent, self-sufficient	small ladle ਕੜਛੀ
bibekă ਬਿਬੇਕ	discernment	discussion or improvement of the Sikh code of conduct ਰਹਿਤ ਮਰਿਆਦਾ ਬਾਰੇ ਵਿਚਾਰ ਵਟਾਂਦਰਾ, ਸੋਧ, ਰਹਿਤ ਮਰਿਯਾਦਾ ਅਨੁਸਾਰ ਵਿਚਾਰ
bibekkī, bibekkī siṅghă ਬਿਬੇਕੀ, ਬਿਬੇਕੀ ਸਿੰਘ	of discernment	deliberator or improver of the Sikh code of conduct ਵਿਚਾਰਵਾਨ, ਸੋਧੀ ਸਿੰਘ, ਵਿਚਾਰਵਾਨ ਸਿੰਘ, ਖਾਲਸਾ ਧਰਮ ਅਨੁਸਾਰ ਪਵਿਤ੍ਰਤਾ ਰੱਖਣ ਵਾਲਾ
bihaṅgam ਬਿਹੰਗਮ	wandering, detached	wandering Nihang ਰਮਤਾ ਸਿੰਘ, ਵਿਚਰਨ ਵਾਲਾ ਸਿੰਘ
bikhiā ਬਿਖਿਆ	poisonous, sinful	tobacco ਤਮਾਕੂ
billā ਬਿੱਲਾ	tomcat	Englishman ਅੰਗਰੇਜ਼
birājṇā ਬਿਰਾਜਣਾ	holding court, to sit at ease, to preside	to sit ਬੈਠਣਾ, ਲੇਟਣਾ
bird, bidar ਬਿਰਦ, ਬਿਦਰ	custom, practice, garb	garb ਪਹਿਰਾਵਾ, ਲਿਬਾਸ
bidarbāṇā ਬਿਦਰਬਾਣਾ	custom, practice, garb	Khalsa garb ਖਾਲਸਾਈ ਪਹਿਰਾਵਾ
bollā ਬੋਲਾ	masculinized form of ਬੋਲੀ bollī, "language, speech"	language, speech
brahmras ਬ੍ਰਹਮਰਸ	Godly drink	sugarcane, its juice ਗੰਨਾ, ਇੱਖ ਦਾ ਰਸ, ਕਮਾਦ
buddhă avătār ਬੁੱਧ ਅਵਤਾਰ	incarnation of Buddha	crippled; legless and handless ਲੰਗੜਾ, ਲੂਲ੍ਹਾ, ਟੁੰਡਾ
buḍḍhīe ਬੁੱਢੀਏ	vocative of ਬੁੱਢੀ buḍḍhī, "old woman"	woman, often regardless of age
bundī ਬੁੰਦੀ	sweets	boiled gram or grain ਉਬਲੀ ਦਾਲ, ਬੱਕਲੀਆਂ
buṅgā ਬੁੰਗਾ	dwelling	dwelling of Nihangs; a tall dumalla ਸਿੰਘਾਂ ਦਾ ਨਿਵਾਸ ਥਾਂ; ਨਿਹੰਗ ਸਿੰਘਾਂ ਦਾ ਉੱਚਾ ਦੁਮਾਲਾ
cakrailă ਚਕ੍ਰੈਲ	related to the term ਚੱਕਰਵਰਤੀ cakkarvartī, "sovereign"	wandering, roaming, sovereign Sikh ਚੱਕਰਵਰਤੀ ਸਿੰਘ, ਰਮਤਾ ਬਿਹੰਗਮ
calākā ਚਲਾਕਾ	clever, crafty man	thick needle ਸੂਆ
calākaṇ ਚਲਾਕਣ	clever, crafty woman	small needle, spud, hoe (tool) ਸੂਈ, ਖੁਰਪਾ, ਰੰਬੀ
cāndănī-pulāo ਚਾਂਦਨੀ ਪੁਲਾਓ	dish of cooked rice	parched millet ਭੁੰਨੀ ਜਵਾਹ, ਖਿੱਚੜੀ
caṇḍī ਚੰਡੀ	Chandi	sword, fire, fight ਅੱਗ, ਤਲਵਾਰ, ਲੜਾਈ
carandāsī ਚਰਨਦਾਸੀ	maidservant, attached to the master's feet	shoes ਜੁੱਤੀ
caṛhāī ਚੜ੍ਹਾਈ	incline, ascent, charge	march, departure ਕੂਚ
caṛhāī karnā ਚੜ੍ਹਾਈ ਕਰਨਾ	to invade, proceed on an expedition (into the next world), conquer the enemy post, ਹੱਲਾ ਬੋਲਣਾ	to die ਮਰਨਾ
cataṇa pulāu ਚਟਣ ਪਲਾਉ	(finger-)licking rice	chutney ਚਟਣੀ
catauṛă toṛnā, gaṛhă toṛnā,kilā dhāhuṇā ਗੜ੍ਹ ਤੋੜਨਾ, ਕਿਲਾ ਢਾਹੁਣਾ	collapse a fort, Chittor or Multan	to answer the call of nature ਮੂਤਰਨਾ/ਮੂਤਣਾ, ਹੱਗਣਾ, ਔੌਖਾ ਕੰਮ ਸਿਰੋਂ ਚੜ੍ਹਾਉਣਾ
cautthā ਚੌਥਾ	fourth	salt ਲੂਣ
cautthā pauṛā ਚੌਥਾ ਪਉੜਾ	fourth rung, class	Mazhabi Sikh ਮਜ਼ਹਬੀ ਸਿੱਖ
chakăṇā ਛਕਣਾ	to dine	to eat, drink ਖਾਣਾ, ਪੀਣਾ
chāndā ਛਾਂਦਾ	a portion, share ਹਿੱਸਾ	
chāppā mārnā ਛਾਪਾ ਮਾਰਨਾ	to ambush, surprise attack	showing up spontaneously to the homes of friends or relatives
chararā chaḍḍăṇa ਛਰਰਾ ਛੱਡਣਾ	to discharge a bullet	to urinate ਮੂਤਣਾ
chattardhārā ਛੱਤਰਧਾਰਾ	imperial	opium ਅਫੀਮ
chāuṇī ਛਾਉਣੀ	encampment, cantonment	the camp of Nihaṅgs, kacchera (Note: According to Khushwant Singh, their kachere were " notoriously large in size and, when hung out to dry, from a far distance would appear to enemy scouts as tents of the Khalsa warriors; suggesting the Khalsa warriors numbered far greater than they did. Sava lakh - a hundred thousand! - to be precise.") ਨਿਹੰਗਾਂ ਜਾਂ ਸਿੰਘਾਂ ਦਾ ਡੇਰਾ, ਸਿੰਘਾਂ ਦਾ ਅੱਡਾ, ਕਛਹਿਰਾ
chevā̃ ਛੇਵਾਂ	sixth	(cooking) oil ਤੇਲ
chillaṛ ਛਿੱਲੜ	tree bark, husk	money, rupee, coin ਰੁਪਈਆ
cimanī begum ਚਿਮਨੀ ਬੇਗਮ	humorous name for a woman	opium ਅਫ਼ੀਮ
cīta bhajāuṇā ਚੀਤਾ ਭਜਾਉਣਾ	to drive away a cheetah	to urinate ਮੂਤਣਾ
cobăcīnī ਚੋਬਚੀਨੀ	a medicinal root, Smilax china	red pepper ਲਾਲ ਮਿਰਚ
corbattī ਚੋਰਬੱਤੀ	thief-lamp	flashlight ਟਾਰਚ, ਬੈਟਰੀ
cubāre caṛhiā	climbed the upper storey	deaf person ਬੋਲ਼ਾ
cugal ਚੁਗਲ	back-biter, tattler	mirror, poppy husk ਸ਼ੀਸ਼ਾ, ਪੌਸਤ ਡੋਡਾ
cūnnā ਚੂਨਾ	limestone powder, lime	flour ਆਟਾ
cuppă ਚੁੱਪ	silence	sugar ਖੰਡ
curāssī ਚੁਰਾਸੀ	eighty-four	worldly people, referring to the cycle of 84 lakh (8.4 million) reincarnations ਦਨਿਆਵੀ ਲੋਕ
cūrmā ਚੂਰਮਾ	churma	wheat chaff ਭੋ, ਤੂੜੀ
cuṭăkā parsādă ਚੁਟਕਾ ਪ੍ਰਸਾਦ	offering of a large handful	ground salt and pepper ਰਗੜੀ ਲੂਣ ਮਿਰਚ
dasnambarīā ਦਸਨੰਬਰੀਆ	numbered ten	tubewell ਨਲਕਾ
dast panjā ਦਸਤ ਪੰਜਾ	handshake	tongs, pincers ਚਿਮਟਾ, ਸੰਨ੍ਹੀ
dastār ਦਸਤਾਰ	dastar, Sikh turban ਪੱਗ	
DC		limper
dabṛū ghusṛū ਦਬੜੂ ਘੁਸੜੂ	homebody out of timidity, unassertive, unremarkable ਦੁਬਕ ਕੇ ਘਰ ਵਿੱਚ ਵੜ ਜਾਣ ਵਾਲਾ; ਕਾਇਰ	individual lacking in Sikh conduct, coward, self-willed ਰਹਿਤ ਮਰਿਆਦਾ ਵਿੱਚ ਢਿੱਲਾ, ਡਰਾਕਲ, ਮਨਮਤੀਆ
ḍaiṇ ਡੈਣ	witch	maya, illusion ਮਾਇਆ
dākh ਦਾਖ	grape	fruit of Salvadora persica ਪੀਲੂ
dal ਦਲ	army	army of Singhs ਸਿੰਘਾਂ ਦੀ ਫੌਜ
ḍalā ਡਲਾ	large lump	piece of boiled meat ਰਿੱਧੇ ਮਾਸ ਦਾ ਟੁਕੜਾ
damaṛā ਦਮੜਾ	coin or small money, from ਦੰਮ damm, money	a single rupee ਰੁਪਈਆ
degă, deggā ਦੇਗ, ਦੇਗਾ	cauldron	Karah Parshad, laṅgar ਪ੍ਰਸਾਦ ਪਾਣੀ, ਕੜਾਹ ਪ੍ਰਸਾਦ, ਲੰਗਰ
degă mast ਦੇਗ ਮਸਤ	ecstacy of the cauldron	for laṅgar to run out, or not be made ਲੰਗਰ ਘਟਣਾ ਜਾਂ ਨਾ ਪੱਕਣਾ
ḍhahindī kalā ਢਹਿੰਦੀ ਕਲਾ	opposite of chardi kala, collapsing spirits	pessimism ਡਿੱਗਿਆ ਹੋਇਆ ਮਨ
dhanantar ਧਨੰਤਰ	Dhanvantari	neem ਨਿੰਮ
dharamrāj dā puttar ਧਰਮਰਾਜ ਦਾ ਪੁੱਤ, ਪੁੱਤਰ	son of the mythical Dharamrāj, dispenser of divine justice	fever ਬੁਖਾਰ, ਤਾਪ
dharamrāj dī dhī ਧਰਮਰਾਜ ਦੀ ਧੀ	daughter of the angel of death	sleep ਨੀਂਦ
dharamrāj dī dhī dī sevā ਧਰਮਰਾਜ ਦੀ ਧੀ ਦੀ ਸੇਵਾ	being cared for by the angel of death's daughter	being ill ਜੁਰ ਚੜ੍ਹਿਆ ਹੋਣਾ
ḍhiḍḍă phūkăṇī ਢਿੱਡ ਫੂਕਣੀ	stomach destroyer	tea ਚਾਹ
dhokkhe bājă ਧੋਖੇਬਾਜ	imposter	spoon ਚਮਚਾ
dhullay		meat
dhură dī ṭikaṭ ਧੁਰ ਦੀ ਟਿਕਟ	ticket to the extremity or ends	death ਮੌਤ
dhūṛkoṭ ਧੂੜਕੋਟ, ਧੂੜ ਕੋਟਾ	dust fort	woman's heavy skirt ਘੱਗਰਾ
diāl kaur ਦਿਆਲ ਕੌਰ	kind lady	ladle ਕੜਛੀ
didārā siṅghă ਦਿਦਾਰਾ ਸਿੰਘ, ਦਿਦਾਰਾ	a man's name, "sighted Singh"	mirror ਸ਼ੀਸ਼ਾ
duburjī ਦੁਬੁਰਜੀ	two-towered	sutthan (a type of salwār) ਸੁੱਥਣ
dumallā ਦੁਮੱਲਾ	dumalla, a style of turban, or the fluttering cloth on its top ਉੱਚਾ ਸਜਾਇਆ ਦੁਹਰਾ ਦਸਤਾਰਾ, ਦਮੱਲੇ ਵਿੱਚ ਫਰਹਰਾ	
dumbā ਦੁੰਬਾ	fat-tailed	peṭṭhā (candied wax gourd) ਪੇਠਾ
dunālī ਦੁਨਾਲੀ	double-barreled	pitchfork ਸਾਂਗੀ, ਸਲੰਘ
dusāṅgā ਦੁਸਾਂਗਾ	two-pronged	trousers ਪਤਲੂਨ, ਪਜਾਮਾ
dushāllā ਦੂਸ਼ਾਲਾ	double shawl	blanket ਕੰਬਲ
fateh kumait ਫਤਿਹ ਕੁਮੈਤ	winning bay horse	black-coloured club ਸੋਟੀ
faujă ਫੌਜ	army	one Nihang, one Singh ਇੱਕ ਬਿਹੰਗਮ ਸਿੰਘ, ਇੱਕ ਸਿੰਘ
faujā̃ ਫੌਜਾਂ	armies	many Singhs ਕਈ ਸਿੰਘ
gaḍḍī cāṛhnā ਗੱਡੀ ਚਾੜ੍ਹਨਾ	to lift onto a cart	to kill an enemy ਵੈਰੀ ਨੂੰ ਮਾਰ ਦੇਣਾ
gahirā gapphā ਗਹਰਾ ਗੱਫਾ	deep mouthful	to obtain a great amount of victuals ਤ੍ਰਿਪਤ ਹੋਕੇ ਭੋਜਨ ਛਕਣਾ
gajăgāh ਗਜਗਾਹ	an ornament placed on the forehead of an elephant or horse	a weapon or emblem worn on a dumalla ਵੱਡਾ ਚੰਦ ਤੋੜਾ ਜਿਹੜਾ ਦੁਮਾਲੇ ਤੇ ਸਜਾਈਦੈ
gajjăṇā ਗੱਜਣਾ	to roar	to speak, or speak loudly ਬੋਲਣਾ, ਉੱਚੀ ਅਵਾਜ਼ ਨਾਲ ਬੋਲਣਾ
gaṇḍhală ਗੰਢਲ	knotted, gnarled	a lapsed Sikh who repeats Khalsa initiation ਜੌ ਪਤਿਤ ਹੋਣ ਉਪਰੰਤਤ ਦੁਬਾਰਾ ਅੰਮ੍ਰਿਤ ਧਾਨ ਕਰਕੇ ਗੁਰੂ ਨਾਲ ਗੰਢਦਾ ਹੈ
gaṅgā jal ਗੰਗਾ ਜਲ	water of the Ganges	liquor ਸ਼ਰਾਬ
gapphā lāuṇā ਗੱਫਾ ਲਾਉਣਾ	to take mouthfuls	to dine heartily ਰੱਜ ਕੇ ਖਾਜਾ ਛਕਣਾ
garam jal	hot water	beverage concoction made of cannabis and dry fruit
garaṛe ਗਰੜੇ	dust	rice ਚਉਲ
garaṛā ਗਰੜਾ	piebald horse	rice of good quality ਵਧੀਆ ਚੌਲ
ghallūghārā ਘੱਲੂਘਾਰਾ	massacre	terrible war ਅਤਿ ਭਿਆਨਕ ਜੰਗ
ghoṛā,ghoṛe ਘੋੜਾ, ਘੋੜੇ	horse(s)	shoe(s) ਜੁੱਤਾ, ਜੁੱਤੇ
ghoṛā kājje karnā ਘੋੜਾ ਕਾਜੇ ਕਰਨਾ	to rein a horse	to be sexually abstinent, self-disciplined ਜਤ ਸਤ ਧਾਰਨਾ
ghoṛā duṛāuṇā ਘੋੜਾ ਦੁੜਾਉਣਾ	to run a horse	to engage in coitus ਸੰਭੋਗ ਕਰਨਾ
ghusmusā ਘੁਸਮੁਸਾ	dusk, dim, obscure	whisper in the ear ਕੰਨਾਬਾਤੀ, ਘੁਸਰ-ਮੁਸਰ
giānī siṅghă ਗਿਆਨੀ ਸਿੰਘ	a man's name, "Sage Singh"	Sikh preacher ਬਾਣੀ ਦੀ ਕਥਾ ਵਿਚਾਰ ਕਰਨ ਵਾਲਾ
giddaṛă ਗਿੱਦੜ	jackal	coward ਕੈਰ, ਡਰਾਕਲ
giddaṛă raṅgā ਗਿੱਦੜ ਰੰਗਾ	jackal-colored	saffron-wearing sadhu ਭਗਵਾ ਪਹਿਣਨ ਵਾਲਾ ਸਾਧ
giṭṭe vaḍḍhī ਗਿੱਟੇ ਵੱਢੀ	ankle-chop	sutthaṇ, a sort of trouser ਸੁੱਥਣ
gobindā ਗੋਬਿੰਦਾ, ਗੁਬਿੰਦਾ	a man's name	watermelon, melon, cantaloupe ਹਦਵਾਣਾ, ਖਰਬੂਜਾ
gobindī ਗੋਬਿੰਦੀ, ਗੁਬਿੰਦੀ	a woman's name	carrot ਗਾਜਰ
golakă ਗੋਲਕ	donation box at gurdwaras ਜਿਸ ਵਿੱਚ ਗੁਰੂ ਨਮਿਤ ਦਿੱਤੀ ਭੇਟ ਰੱਖੀਦੀ ਹੈ	
golī	bullet	medicinal pill, tablet, or capsule
guddaṛă ਗੁੱਦੜ	old tattered clothes	cream ਮਲਾਈ
guṛă ਗੁੜ	jaggery (unrefined cane sugar)	
gurmatā ਗੁਰਮਤਾ	resolution adopted by consensus of the Sikh congregation ਸਿਖ ਸੰਗਤ ਵਿੱਚ ਵਿਚਾਰ ਪਿੱਛੋਂ ਕੀਤਾ ਨਿਰਣਾ	
gurmukhī parshad ਗੁਰਮੁਖੀ ਪ੍ਰਸਾਦਿ	blessed sacrament of the Gurmukhs	coarse grain
gupāl phal, gupāl laḍḍū ਗੁਪਾਲਫਲ, ਗੁਪਾਲ ਲੱਡੂ	cowherd fruit or sweetmeat	egg ਆਂਡਾ
guptā ਗੁਪਤਾ	secretive	dumb, unable to speak ਗੁੰਗਾ
hajār mekhī ਹਜਾਰ ਮੇਖੀ	of a thousand tacks	worn-out scarf, bedding, quilt ਪਾਟੀ ਪੁਰਾਣੀ ਗੋਦੜੀ
hajūr sāhib ਹਜ਼ੂਰ ਸਾਹਿਬ	Hazur Sahib ਨਾਂਦੇੜ ਵਿੱਚ ਗੁਰੂ ਗੋਬਿੰਦ ਸਿੰਘ ਜੀ ਦੇ ਜੌਤੀ ਜੋਤਿ ਸਮਾਉਣ ਦਾ ਅਸਥਾਨ	
hajūrīā ਹਜ਼ੂਰੀਆ	one in presence	a cloth or towel in use worn on a sevādār's shoulder ਸੇਵਾ ਵਿੱਚ ਰਹਿਣ ਵਾਲਾ ਪਰਨਾ, ਤੌਲੀਆ
haṅkāriā ਹੰਕਾਰਿਆ, ਹੰਕਾਰਿਆ ਹੋਇਆ	arrogant	torn ਪਾਟਿਆ ਹੋਇਆ
hannā ਹੰਨਾ	pommel of a saddle	male part ਲਿੰਗ
harā ਹਰਾ	green, verdant	dried ਸੁੱਕਾ
harā karnā ਹਰਾ ਕਰਨਾ	to make green	to dry hair ਕੇਸ ਸੁਕਾਉਣਾ
harā pallā ਹਰਾ ਪੱਲਾ	green rice	grass
harn hoṇā ਹਰਨ ਹੋਣਾ	to become a deer ਭੱਜ ਜਾਣਾ	to flee ਭੱਜਣਾ, ਦੌੜਨਾ
harnī	doe	fly ਮੱਖੀ
hīrāhīre ਹੀਰਾ, ਹੀਰੇ	diamond(s)	white hair(s) ਧੌਲਾ, ਧੌਲੇ
holā̃ ਹੋਲਾਂ, ਹੋਲ੍ਹਾਂ	half ripe pulse parched in the pod	cardamoms ਇਲੈਚੀਆਂ
holā ਹੋਲਾ	Hola Mohalla	fight ਲੜਾਈ
holā muhallā ਹੋਲਾ ਮੁਹੱਲਾ	Hola Mohalla, an observance on which martial arts are exhibited ਸ਼ਸਤਰ ਵਿਦਿਆ ਦੀ ਪ੍ਰਦਰਸ਼ਨੀ ਦਾ ਤਿਹਾਰ	
hukam sati ਹੁਕਮ ਸਤਿ	true order	to die, dead ਚਲਾਣਾ ਕਰਨਾ, ਮਰਨਾ
hullā ਹੁੱਲਾ	blast of the East Wind	hurry ਕਾਹਲੀ
hūnjhā ਹੂੰਝਾ	sweeper, sweeping thing, sweeping	lungi ਤੰਬਾ, ਤਹਿਮਤ
ilācī ਇਲਾਚੀ	cardamom	a twig of phalāhī or acacia chewed to cleanse teeth ਫਲਾਹੀ ਦੀ ਦਾਤਣ
indar ਇੰਦਰ	Indra	rain, clouds, rainclouds ਬੱਦਲ, ਮੀਂਹ
indarāṇī ਇੰਦਰਾਣੀ	Indra's consort	emaciated mare, wind ਮਰੀਅਲ ਘੋੜੀ, ਪੌਣ
īśar kaur ਈਸ਼ਰ ਕੌਰ	a woman's name, Godly	ladle ਕੜਛੀ
jagat jūṭh ਜਗਤ ਜੂਠ	universal pollution/leftovers	hukkā; hubble-bubble ਹੁੱਕਾ, ਤੰਬਾਕੂ
jagannāthī ਜਗਨਨਾਥੀ	little Jagannath	earthen cooking pot ਤੌੜੀ
jahājă ਜਹਾਜ	ship	cart, bullock-cart ਗੱਡਾ
jahāje caṛhnā ਜਹਾਜੇ ਚੜ੍ਹਨਾ	to board the ship	to be initiated as a Khalsa ਅੰਮ੍ਰਿਤ ਛਕ ਕੇ ਸਿੰਘ ਸਜਣਾ
jakārā ਜਕਾਰਾ, ਜੈਕਾਰਾ	cry of victory	loud exclamation of "Sat Sri Akal" -ਸਤਿ ਸ੍ਰੀ ਅਕਾਲ ਦਾ ਉੱਚੀ ਅਵਾਜ ਨਾਲ ਲਾਇਆ ਨਾਅਰਾ
jakkā ਜੱਕਾ		dahi ਦਹੀਂ
jalebbī ਜਲੇਬੀ	jalebi	pod of prosopis cineraria ਜੰਡਫਲੀ, ਜੰਡ ਦੀ ਫਲੀ
jalkhică siṅghă ਜਲਖਿਚ ਸਿੰਘ	a man's name, "water-pull Singh"	a water-carrying Jhinwar ਪਾਣੀ ਢੋਣ ਵਾਲਾ ਝੀਰ
jaltorī ਜਲਤੋਰੀ	water luffa	fish ਮੱਛੀ
jān bhāī ਜਾਨ ਭਾਈ	dear brother, blood brother	personal horse ਆਪਣੀ ਸਵਾਰੀ ਦਾ ਘੋੜਾ
jaṅgal pāṇī jāṇā ਜੰਗਲ ਪਾਣੀ ਜਾਣਾ	to answer the call of nature, "to go jungle-water"	to go defecate ਟੱਟੀ ਜਾਣਾ
jaṛ puṭṭ ਜੜ ਪੁੱਟ	root-tear	tweezers ਮੋਚਣਾ
jatthā ਜੱਥਾ	band, flock	group of Sikhs ਸਿੰਘਾਂ ਦਾ ਟੋਲਾ
jatthedār ਜੱਥੇਦਾਰ	band leader, flock holder	leader of a group of Sikhs ਸਿੰਘ ਮੰਡਲੀ ਦਾ ਮੁਖੀ
jhaṭakā,cuṭaṅgā ਝਟਕਾ	jhatka	to behead with one swing ਇਕੇ ਵਾਰ ਧੜੋਂ ਸਿਰ ਵੱਖ ਕਰਨਾ
jhaṭaṅgā ਝਟੰਗਾ, ਚੁਟੰਗਾ	four-legged, with possible semantic influence from jhatka	goat ਬੱਕਰਾ
joṛ mel ਜੋੜ ਮੇਲ	join-meet	gathering of Sikhs ਸਿੱਖਾਂ ਦਾ ਇਕੱਠ
joṛ melṇī ਜੋੜ ਮੇਲਣੀ	match-maker	sewing needle ਕੱਪੜਾ ਬੁਣਨ ਵਾਲੀ ਸੁਈ
jū̃ā̃ dī pīṅgh ਜੂੰਆਂ ਦੀ ਪੀਂਘ	a swing for lice	janeu ਮੋਚਣਾ
juāllā vamaṇī ਜੁਆਲਾ ਵਮਣੀ	from ਜੁਆਲਾ juāllā or ਜਵਾਲਾ javāllā meaning "flame"	firearm ਬੰਦੂਕ
kābalī kuttā ਕਾਬਲੀ ਕੁੱਤਾ	dog of Kabul	Ahmad Shah Abdali ਅਹਿਮਦ ਸ਼ਾਹ ਅਬਦਾਲੀ
kaccā pillā ਕੱਚਾ ਪਿੱਲਾ	not fully cooked or ripened	not solid in Sikh conduct ਰਹਿਤ ਮਰਿਆਦਾ ਦਾ ਢਿੱਲਾ
kaccā bollā ਕੱਚਾ ਬੋਲਾ	unripe words	false or frivolous speech, non-khalsa bole speech ਝੂਠਾ ਬਚਨ, ਹਲਕੀ ਗੱਲ, ਖਾਲਸਈ ਬੋਲਿਆਂ ਤੋਂ ਬਾਹਰਲੀ ਗੱਲ
kaccī bāṇī ਕੱਚੀ ਬਾਣੀ	unripe verse	verse not considered authentic gurbani ਗੁਰਬਾਣੀ ਬਿਨਾ ਹੋਰ ਕਾਵਿ-ਰਚਨਾ
kalgā, kalgā siṅghă ਕਲਗਾ, ਕਲਗਾ ਸਿੰਘ	plume; a man's name, "Plume SIngh"	bald person ਗੰਜਾ
kanūṅgo ਕਾਨੂੰਗੋ	a revenue official	stick, walking-stick ਸੋਟੀ, ਖੂੰਡਾ
kājī ਕਾਜੀ	judge in the field of Islamic jurisprudence, interpreter of Islamic law	cockerel (Note: This is due to the Qazis being associated with the Islamic call to prayer (azhan), a likeness is made to the call of a cockerel, and having "encouraged many atrocities on the Sikhs during the Mughal rule in India.") (Note: "ਏਸੇ ਗੁੱਸੇ ਵਿੱਚ ਉਨ੍ਹਾਂ ਜੇ ਜੰਗਲ ਪਾਣੀ ਜਾਣਾ ਪਵੇ ਤਾਂ ਕਹਿਣਾ: ਕਾਜ਼ੀ ਨੂੰ ਰਸਦ ਦੇਣ ਚੱਲੇ ਹਾਂ..." ("In this very anger, if they had to go answer the call of nature then it was to say: "We're off to give the qazi a ration...")) ਕੁੱਕੜ, ਮੁਰਗਾ
kājjā ਕਾਜਾ	act of binding the reins of a horse to a pommel	hungry ਭੁੱਖਾ
kājjā kholhaṇā ਕਾਜਾ ਖੌਲ੍ਹਣਾ	to unbind the reins of a horse from a pommel	to consume food ਅੰਨ ਪਾਣੀ ਖਾਣਾ
kamarkassā karnā ਕਮਰਕੱਸਾ ਕਰਨਾ	to don waist-belt body armor	to stay ever-prepared, to go to the afterlife ਤਿਆਰ ਬਰ ਤਿਆਰ ਹੋਣਾ, ਪਰਲੋਕ ਗਮਨ ਕਰਨਾ, ਕਿਸੇ ਪਾਸੇ ਤਿਆਰੀ ਕਰਨੀ
kamarkassā khulhāuṇā ਕਮਰਕੱਸਾ ਖੁਲ੍ਹਾਉਣਾ	to have waist-belt body armor opened	to house and manage a guest ਆਏ ਪਰਾਹੁਣੇ ਨੂੰ ਟਿਕਾਣਾ ਦੇਣਾ ਤੇ ਸੰਭਾਲ ਕਰਨਾ
kappaṛ bījă ਕੱਪੜ ਬੀਜ	cloth seed	cotton seed ਵੜੇਵਾਂ
kār bheṭ ਕਾਰ ਭੇਟ	work offering	money or items donated for the sake of the Guru ਗੁਰੁ ਨਮਿਤ ਦਿੱਤੀ ਮਾਇਆ ਜਾਂ ਵੱਥ
kaṛākkā ਕੜਾਕਾ	a cracking or snapping sound, or describing severe cold weather	hunger ਭੁੱਖ
kaṛākkā kaṭṭăṇā ਕੜਾਕਾ ਕੱਟਣਾ	to wait out the cold	to stay hungry ਭੁੱਖਿਆਂ ਰਹਿਣਾ
karāṛī ਕਰਾੜੀ	a type of weed	radish ਮੂਲੀ
kardāră ਕਾਰਦਾਰ	official or agent	wooden instrument for scraping and removing manure from a stall ਫੌੜ੍ਹਾ
kardaunā ਕਰਦੌਨਾ		a small kirpan ਨਿੱਕੀ ਕਿਰਪਾਨ
karellā ਕਰੇਲਾ	bitter gourd	partridge ਤਿੱਤਰ
kastūrā ਕਸਤੂਰਾ	musk-deer	pig ਸੂਰ
kaṭṭā ਕੱਟਾ	young buffalo-calf	elephant ਹਾਥੀ
kaṭhautā ਕਠੌਤਾ	wide wooden dish ਕਾਠ ਦਾ ਭਾਂਡਾ	
kāṭhăgaṛh ਕਾਠਗੜ੍ਹ	wood fort	pyre ਸਿਵਾ, ਚਿਖਾ
kesăkī ਕੇਸਕੀ	small turban ਨਿੱਕੀ ਪੱਗ	
kesar ਕੇਸਰ	saffron	turmeric ਹਲਦੀ
khakkhā ਖੱਖਾ	the Gurmukhi letter khakkhā	Khatri ਖੱਤਰੀ
khajūr ਖਜੂਰ	date fruit	jujube, half ripe pulse parched in the pod ਬੇਰ, ਹੋਲ੍ਹਾਂ
khālsā ਖਾਲਸਾ	Khalsa	an initiated Sikh in full preparation ਤਿਆਰ ਬਰ ਤਿਆਰ ਅੰਮ੍ਰਿਤਧਾਰੀ
khaṇḍă ਖੰਡ	sugar	ashes ਸੁਆਹ
khār samundar ਖਾਰ ਸਮੁੰਦਰ	alkali ocean	lassi ਲੱਸੀ
khicaṛ pulāu ਖਿਚੜ ਪੁਲਾਉ	khichri rice	khichri ਸਾਦੀ ਖਿਚੜੀ
khisăkū ਖਿਸਕੂ	truant, shirker, malingerer; inconsistent, fickle, inconstant	loincloth ਲੰਗੋਟਾ
khurmā ਖੁਰਮਾ	date fruit, a kind of sweetmeat	berry, jujube ਬੇਰ
khottī, gadhī ਖੋਤੀ, ਗਧੀ	jenny donkey	piece of a hookah pipe, hookah, cigarette ਚਿਲਮ, ਹੁੱਕਾ, ਸਿਗਰਟ
khottī cuṅghăṇāgadhī cuṅghaṇā ਖੋਤੀ ਚੁੰਘਣਾ, ਗਧੀ ਚੁੰਗਣਾ	suckling a jenny donkey	smoking hukkā, pipe ਬੀੜੀ ਸਿਗਰਟ ਪੀਣਾ, ਹੁੱਕਾ ਪੀਣਾ
khuśī faujă ਖੁਸ਼ੀ ਫੌਜ	happiness army	group of women ਤਰੀਮਤਾਂ ਦਾ ਟੋਲਾ
khuśk pulāu ਖੁਸ਼ਕ ਪਲਾਉ	dehydrated rice	parched grains ਭੁੱਜੇ ਦਾਣੇ
kotală ਕੋਤਲ	well-bred horse	charpoy, bedstead ਮੰਜਾ, ਪਲੰਘ
kotvāl ਕੋਤਵਾਲ	policeman	dagger ਚਾਕੂ
kūcă ਕੂਚ	march	death ਮੌਤ
kuhī ਕੁਹੀ	bird of prey	sickle ਦਾਤੀ
kuṇăkā ਕੁਣਕਾ	presents; the leavings of food presented to great men, given to dependents; sacred relics	a piece of Karah Parshad ਕੜਾਹ ਪ੍ਰਸਾਦ ਦਾ ਭੋਰਾ
kurahită ਕੁਰਹਿਤ	bad conduct	conduct that breaches Rehat ਸਿੱਖੀ ਰਹਿਣੀ ਵਿਰੁੱਧ ਕੰਮ
kutabădīnă ਕੁਤਬਦੀਨ	Qutb ad-Din, a name of Muslim rulers	dog ਕੁੱਤਾ
kuṭṭhā ਕੁੱਠਾ	slaughtered	halal meat, meat prepared in the "Turk" (Muslim) way ਤੁਰਕ ਰੀਤਿ ਨਾਲ ਬਣਿਆ ਮਾਸ
lācīdāṇā ਲਾਚੀਦਾਣਾ	cardamom seeds	millet ਬਾਜਰਾ
laḍḍū ਲੱਡੂ	laddu	tinda ਟਿੰਡਾ, ਟਿੰਡੋ
lakhnetarā ਲਖਨੇਤਰਾ	one with 100,000 eyes	blind in one eye ਕਾਣਾ
lakhbā̃hā ਲਖਬਾਂਹਾ	one with 100,000 arms	missing a hand ਟੁੰਡਾ
laṇḍībuccī ਲੰਡੀਬੁੱਚੀ	common, unremarkable person	irreligious, codeless, sinful people ਧਰਮਹੀਣ, ਕੁਰਹਿਤੀਏ ਲੋਕ, ਸ਼ਰਾਰਤੀ, ਕੁਕਰਮੀ
lāṅgar ਲੰਗਰ	langar	food ਖਾਣਾ, ਖਾਜਾ
lāṅgciṛā ਲਾਂਗਚਿੜਾ, ਲੌਂਗਚਿੜਾ		garlic ਲੱਸਣ
laṛākī ਲੜਾਕੀ	shrew, quarrelsome woman	red chilli, green chilli ਮਿਰਚ
laverā ਲਵੇਰਾ	milk-giving animal	beardless or sparsely bearded ਅਲੂੰ, ਅਲੂੰਆਂ, ਖੋਦਾ, ਅਣਦਾੜ੍ਹੀਆ
loh ਲੋਹ	large iron plate ਤਵੀ	
loh laṅgar ਲੋਹ ਲੰਗਰ	langar of the iron plate	diet of the Khalsa ਖਾਲਸਾਈ ਦੇਗਾ ਅਤੇ ਖਾਜਾ
mahā̃parśādă ਮਹਾਂਪ੍ਰਸ਼ਾਦ	supreme dish	meat curry ਝਟਕੇ ਦਾ ਰਿੱਧਾ ਮਾਸ
mahikhāsar ਮਹਿਖਾਸਰ	Mahishasura	male buffalo ਝੋਟਾ
maidān mārnā ਮੈਦਾਨ ਮਾਰਨਾ	to hit the field	to go to the toilet ਪਖਾਨੇ ਜਾਣਾ
makhmalī farś ਮਖਮਲੀ ਫਰਸ਼	velvety floor	an especially full, verdant area of grass ਘਾਹ ਵਾਲੀ ਲਹਿਲਹਾਉਂਦਾ ਅਤੇ ਹਰਿਆ-ਭਰਿਆ ਥਾਂ
malăkā ਮਲਕਾ	queen	female cat ਬਿੱਲੀ
māmmā ਮਾਮਾ	maternal uncle	fever ਜੁਰ, ਬੁਖਾਰ
māmlā,muāmlā ਮਾਮਲਾ, ਮੁਆਮਲਾ	revenue	money, procured items ਮੰਗ ਕੇ ਲੀਤਾ ਸਮਾਨ
māmalā lainā ਮਾਮਲਾ ਲੈਣਾ	to collect land revenue ਮਾਲੀਆ ਉਗਰਾਹੁਣਾ	to collect victuals or donations ਧਰਮ ਦਾਨ ਦੀ ਉਗਰਾਹੀ
manmatīā ਮਨਮਤੀਆ	self-willed	renouncer of the Guru ਗੁਰਮਤਿ ਤਿਆਗ ਕੇ ਮਨਮਰਜ਼ੀ ਵਰਤਣ ਵਾਲਾ
mārā bakārā ਮਾਰਾ ਬਕਾਰਾ	striking and roaring	killing and plunder ਲੁੱਟਮਾਰ
marcaunā ਮਰਚੌਨਾ		back pepper ਕਾਲੀ ਮਿਰਚ
maṛolī ਮੜੋਲੀ	small temple	body ਦੇਹੀ
masāṇī ਮਸਾਣੀ	one who removes corpse remains after cremation	anus ਬੁੰਡ, ਗੁਦਾ
mast, mastānā, langar mast ਮਸਤਾਨਾ	in a state of ecstasy, carefree, intoxication, mad with prosperity ਆਪਣੇ ਰੰਗ ਵਿੱਚ ਵਿਚਰਨ ਵਾਲ਼ਾ	empty of personal supplies, empty of provisions, hunger, for laṅgar to run out or not be made ਖਤਮ ਹੋ ਜਾਣਾ (ਜਿਵੇਂ ਲੰਗਰ); ਸਮਾਨ ਵਿੱਚ ਘਾਟਾ, ਪਾਟਿਆ ਹੋਇਆ, ਬਿਮਾਰ, ਪੁਰਾਣਾ, ਲੰਗਰ ਘਟਣਾ ਜਾਂ ਨਾ ਪੱਕਣਾ
mastgaṛh ਮਸਤਗੜ੍ਹ	fort of ecstacy	a mosque converted into a gurdwara ਮਸਜਿਦ ਬਦਲਕੇ ਥਣਾਇਆ ਗੁਰ ਅਸਥਾਨ
mevaṛā ਮੇਵੜਾ	person of Mewar, whence mail couriers were first hired by Emperor Akbar	courier of a Sikh court or gurdwara ਗੁਰੂ ਦਰਬਾਰ ਦਾ ਅਰਦਾਸੀਆ ਹਲਕਾਰਾ
miṭhiāī ਮਿਠਿਆਈ	a sweet	sweet potato ਸ਼ੱਕਰਕੰਦੀ
miṭṭhā parśādā ਮਿੱਠਾ ਪ੍ਰਸ਼ਾਦਾ	sweet offering, sweet sacrament	old bread, leftover roti or chapati more than a day-old ਬੇਹੀ ਰੋਟੀ
miṭṭhat ਮਿੱਠਤ	sweetness	jujube ਬੇਰੀ
morcā (Note: "ਇਹ ਮਾਮੂਲੀ ਕੰਮ ਨੂੰ ਵੀ "ਮੋਰਚਾ ਫਤਿਹ ਆਖਦੇ..." ("They call [the completion of] even a minor task a "frontline victory..."") ਮੋਰਚਾ	front line	endeavour ਮੂਹਰਲੀ ਕਤਾਰ
morcā lāuṇā ਮੋਰਚਾ ਲਾਉਣਾ	to set up a front line	to prepare for any endeavor large or small, to confront the enemy ਜਰੂਰੀ ਕੰਮ ਲਈ ਉੱਦਮ ਕਰਨਾ, ਦੁਸ਼ਮਣ ਨਾਲ ਆਢਾ ਲਾਉਣਾ
mughal ਮੁਗਲ	Mughal	poppy plant, fart ਪੋਸਤ ਦੇ ਡੋਡੇ, ਪੱਦ
mughalastān (Note: "...ਜੇ ਕਿਤੇ ਪਖਾਨਾ ਪਿਆ ਦੇਖਣਾ ਤਾਂ ਕਹਿਣਾ, ਮੁਗਲ ਮਰਿਆ ਪਿਆ ਹੈ..." ("...if for instance a toilet had to be seen then it was to say, "a Mughal lies dead...") ਮੁਗਲਸਤਾਨ	Mughal land, Mughalistan	toilet ਪਖਾਨਾ
mughalāṇī ਮੁਗਲਾਣੀ	female Mughal	black pepper ਕਾਲੀ ਮਿਰਚ
mū̃htāṇī ਮੂੰਹਤਾਣੀ	stretched, warped face	scissors ਕੈਂਚੀ
muhammadī isnān ਮੁਹੰਮਦੀ ਇਸਨਾਨ	Mohammedan bath	bare bath ਨੰਗੇ ਨ੍ਹਾਉਣਾ
muhammadī savārī ਮੁਹੰਮਦੀ ਸਵਾਰੀ	Mohammedan ride	camel ਉੱਠ
muhammadī paulā ਮੁਹੰਮਦੀ ਪੌਲਾ	Mohammedan four-anna coin	razor ਉਸਤਰਾ
mukhmānjaṇā ਮੁਖਮਾਂਜਣਾ	face wipe	tooth-cleaning twig ਦਾਤਣ
murgā ਮੁਰਗਾ	rooster	qadi ਕਾਜ਼ੀ
murgābbī ਮੁਰਗਾਬੀ	tufted duck	fly ਮੱਖੀ
mulāhjā toṛ ਮੁਲਾਹਜ਼ਾ-ਤੋੜ	favoritism-break	rough guess ਸੱਟਾ
musălī yuddh ਮੁਸਲੀ ਯੁੱਧ	war with female Muslim	intercourse with a Turkess ਤੁਰਕਣੀ ਨਾਲ ਭਗ
nahernā siṅghă ਨਹੇਰਨਾ ਸਿੰਘ	a man's name, "Nailcutter Singh"	Nai Sikh, Sikh barber who keeps a nailcutter ਨਾਈ
nākhāṅ, nākhă ਨਾਖਾਂ, ਨਾਖ	pear(s)	fruit of banyan tree ਗੋਲ੍ਹ
nakkă vaḍḍhī ਨਕ ਵੱਢੀ	chopped nose	bus ਬੱਸ
naṛīmāră ਨੜੀਮਾਰ	pipe hitter	hookah smoker ਹੁੱਕਾ ਪੀਣ ਵਾਲਾ
nihkalaṅkă ਨਿਹਕਲੰਕ	without blemish	earthen pitcher ਘੜਾ
Nihāl Kaur, nihālkaur ਨਿਹਾਲ ਕੌਰ	woman's name, meaning "delighted"; satisfying woman	blanket ਕੰਬਲ
niśān sāhib' ਨਿਸ਼ਾਨ ਸਾਹਿਬ	Nishan Sahib, lit. "esteemed marker"	flag ਝੰਡਾ
pacraṅgă ਪਚਰੰਗ	five-color	camp bed ਮੰਜਾ
pahulă ਪਾਹੁਲ	Amrit Sanskar; literally "stirred forth"	ammrit stirred by the sword ਖੰਡੇ ਬਾਟੇ ਦਾ ਅੰਮ੍ਰਿਤ
pahulīā ਪਾਹੁਲੀਆ	of the Amrit Sanskar	initiated Sikh ਅਮ੍ਰਿਤਧਾਰੀ
pammā ਪੰਮਾ	scorning name for Brahmins	deceitful Brahmin ਕਪਟੀ ਬਾਮ੍ਹਣ
pancāmrită ਪੰਚਾਮ੍ਰਿਤ	five nectars	Karah Parshad ਕੜਾਹ ਪ੍ਰਸਾਦ
panjakkhā, panjakkhā siṅghă ਪੰਜੱਖਾ ਸਿੰਘ	argus-eyed lion, a man's name, "Five-Eyes Singh"	half-blind man, one-eyed ਕਾਣਾ
pañjă isnānā ਪੰਜ ਇਸਨਾਨਾ	five baths	washing of face, hands, and feet only ਮੂੰਹ ਹੱਥ ਧੋਣਾ, ਦੋ ਹੱਥ ਦੋ ਪੈਰ ਅਤੇ ਮੂੰਹ ਧੋਣਾ
pañjăvā̃ ਪੰਜਵਾਂ	fifth	clarified butter, ghee ਘਿਉ
pañjăratanā ਪੰਜਰਤਨਾ	five jewels	vegetable dish of carrot, oil, turnip, eggplant, and onion ਗਾਜਰ, ਮੂਲੀ, ਗੋਂਗਲੂ, ਵੈਂਗਣ ਤੇ ਗੰਢਾ ਜਾਂ ਕੱਦੂ ਮਿਲਾ ਕੇ ਬਣਾਇਆ ਭਾਜਾ
panthă ਪੰਥ	path (of faith)	the Khalsa ਖਾਲਸਾ ਕੌਮ
palṭā ਪਲਟਾ	an overturning	scraper ਖੁਰਚਣਾ
parī ਪਰੀ	fairy	sheep ਭੇਡ
pāṛhī ਪਾੜ੍ਹੀ	dove	carrot ਗਾਜਰ
parkaśā siṅghă ਪ੍ਰਕਾਸ਼ਾ ਸਿੰਘ	a man's name, "Illumination Singh"	day ਦਿਨ
parsā ਪਰਸਾ	a reference to water, from praśādi, "offering"	water ਜਲ
parsāddā ਪਰਸਾਦਾ	offering	Roti bread ਰੋਟੀ
parsram, parsuram ਪਰਸਰਾਮ, ਪਰਸੁਰਾਮ	Parashurama	axe ਕੁਹਾੜਾ
patālpurī, patāl mocnī ਪਤਾਲਪੁਰੀ, ਪਤਾਲ ਮੋਚਨੀ		hoe ਕਹੀ
Pathan sirī ਪਠਾਣ ਸਿਰੀ	Pashtun head (Note: "... ਜੇ ਜੁੱਤੀਆਂ ਟਕਰਾ ਕੇ ਝਾੜਨਾ ਤਾਂ ਕਹਿਣਾ, ਅਸੀਂ ਪਠਾਣਾਂ ਦੇ ਸਿਰ ਭਿੜਾ ਰਹੇ ਹਾਂ ਆਦਿਕ । ...if shoes were to be dusted off by beating them against each other, then it was to say, "We are clashing Pathan heads, etc." See Afghan-Sikh Wars for background information on historical Afghan-Sikh relations.)	cauliflower ਗੋਭੀ
patwari ਪਟਵਾਰੀ	tax-collector/village accountant	cat ਬਿੱਲਾ
pauṇ turaṅg ਪੌਣ ਤੁਰੰਗ	flying horse	jaded, worn-out pony ਮਰੀਅਲ ਟੱਟੂ
pauṇă parkāśă ਪੌਣ ਪ੍ਰਕਾਸ਼	lighter of wind	fan ਪੱਖਾ
phaṭă phaṭă ਫਟ ਫਟ	rapid	motorcycle ਮੋਟਰਸੈਕਲ
phaṭṭaṛ parsāddā ਫੱਟੜ ਪ੍ਰਸਾਦਾ	wounded offering	half a roti ਅੱਧੀ ਰੋਟੀ
phiraṅgaṇă ਫਿਰੰਗਣ	female Firangi (European)	automobile ਗੱਡੀ, ਕਾਰ
phirnā ਫਿਰਨਾ	to turn	animal-powered griding mill ਖਰਾਸ
phirnī ਫਿਰਨੀ	circulator	hand-operated millstone ਚੱਕੀ
rahiṇī bahiṇī ਰਹਿਣੀ ਬਹਿਣੀ	comportment, "ways of staying and sitting"	conduct and behavior ਰਹਿਤ ਅਤੇ ਵਿਹਾਰ
rajjī ਰੱਜੀ	satiated	small ladle ਕਰਛੀ
rāmbāgh ਰਾਮ ਬਾਗ	grand garden	forest ਜੰਗਲ
rāmcāunkā ਰਾਮਚੌਂਕਾ	grand kitchen	langar set up in a desolate area ਉਜਾੜ ਵਿੱਚ ਬਣਾਇਆ ਲੰਗਰ ਸਥਾਨ
rām ḍol ਰਾਮ ਡੋਲ	grand metal bucket	leather bucket for drawing wellwater ਬੋਕਾ
rāmjaṅgā ਰਾਮਜੰਗਾ	grand battle(r)	gun, musket ਬੰਦੂਕ
rāmlaḍḍū ਰਾਮ ਲੱਡੂ	grand sweetmeat	watermelon ਹਦਵਾਣਾ, ਮਤੀਰਾ
rām ras ਰਾਮ ਰਸ	grand juice	salt ਲੂਣ
raṇă siṅgā ਰਣ ਸਿੰਗਾ	battlefield horn	fart ਪੱਦ
raṇḍī kaṛhī ਰੰਡੀ ਕੜ੍ਹੀ	widowed kaṛhī	broth of gram flour without grain ਪਕੌੜਿਆਂ ਤੋਂ ਬਿਨਾਂ ਕੜ੍ਹੀ
raṅghaṛ ਰੰਘੜ	Ranghar	mulberry ਤੂਤ
raṅghăṛī ਰੰਘੜੀ	female Ranghar	ear of corn ਮੱਕੀ ਦੀ ਛੱਲੀ
raśamī nāḷā ਰਸ਼ਮੀ ਨਾਲਾ	silken drawstring	drawstring made of jute ਸਣ ਦਾ ਬਣਿਆ ਨਾਲਾ
reśam ਰੇਸ਼ਮ	silk	Jute (bast fibre) ਸਣ
roṛ ਰੋੜ	gravel, pebble	kidney bean, or moth bean ਮੋਠ
roṛū parshād ਰੋੜੂ ਪ੍ਰਸ਼ਾਦ	fast-rolling offering	achar of Capparis decidua; onion ਡੇਲਿਆਂ ਦਾਂ ਅਚਾਰ, ਗੰਢਾ
rūp kaur ਰੂਪ ਕੌਰ	beautiful form; woman's name	pitcher in which milk is boiled, wheat ਕਾੜ੍ਹਨੀ, ਕਣਕ
rupaīā ਰੁਪਈਆ	rupee currency	pebble
ruppā ਰੁੱਪਾ	silver piece	onion ਗੰਢਾ
rūp ras ਰੂਪ ਰਸ	silvery drink	salt, salt water ਲੂਣ, ਸਲੂਣਾ ਪਾਣੀ
sabajă mandar ਸਬਜ ਮੰਦਰ	green temple	shady tree ਛਾਇਆਦਾਰ ਬਿਰਛ
sabajă pulāosabaz palāa ਸਬਜ ਪੁਲਾਉ, ਸਬਜ਼ ਪਲਾਅ	green dish of rice	dish made of sarsoṅ (mustard) leaves ਸਾਗ
sacăkhaṇḍă ਸਚਖੰਡ	region of truth	heavenly abode ਸੁਰਗ
sacăkhaṇḍă vāssā ਸਚਖੰਡ ਵਾਸਾ	residence of the region of truth	heavenly abode ਗੁਰਪੁਰ ਨਿਵਾਸ
saccā pātăśāh ਸੱਚਾਪਾਤਸ਼ਾਹ	true king	God ਅਕਾਲ ਪੁਰਖ, ਸਤਿਗੁਰੂ ਜੀ
sadā gulābă ਸਦਾ ਗੁਲਾਬ	perennial rose	acacia tree ਕਿੱਕਰ
safājaṅgă ਸਫਾਜੰਗ	cleanser in battle	small hatchet to cut twigs from trees for toothbrushes ਟਕੂਆ, ਕੁਹਾੜੀ
saitānī carkhā ਸੈਤਾਨੀ ਚਰਖਾ	Satanic spinning wheel	bicycle ਸੈਕਲ
sajăṇā ਸਜਣਾ	to be decorated, befitting	to be prepared, comport oneself, well dressed ਸੌਹਣੀ ਤਰ੍ਹਾਂ ਬੈਠਣਾ, ਤਿਆਰ ਹੋਣਾ, ਬਣਨਾ, ਸ਼ਸਤਰ ਬਸਤਰ ਪਹਿਰਣੇ
salottară ਸਲੋਤਰ	veterinarian	thick club used by Nihangs ਮੋਟਾ ਸੋਟਾ
sākată ਸਾਕਤ	worshipper of money or power	one who has renounced the Gurus ਗੁਰੂ ਤੋਂ ਬੇਮੁਖ
samundară ਸਮੁੰਦਰ	ocean, sea	milk ਦੁੱਧ
sarb ras ਸਰਬ ਰਸ	essence of life, manifold flavour	salt ਲੂਣ
sarbloh ਸਰਬਲੋਹ	all-iron	God ਅਕਾਲ ਪੁਰਖ, ਸ਼ਸਤਰ
sarblohīā ਸਰਬਲੋਹੀਆ	of all-iron	a Singh who only takes food and drink in iron plates ਉਹ ਸਿੰਘ ਜਿਹੜਾ ਲੋਹੇ ਦੇ ਭਾਂਡਿਆਂ ਵਿੱਚੋਂ ਹੀ ਖਾਜਾ ਪਾਣੀ ਛਕਦੈ
sardāră ਸਰਦਾਰ	turbaned Sikh	Sikh in full attire ਸਜਿਆ ਵਜਿਆ ਸਿੱਖ
sardaunā ਸਰਦੌਨਾ	cold ਠੰਢ, ਪਾਲਾ	cold, shivering, trembling ਠੰਢ, ਕਾਂਬਾ
sarmaī dāl ਸਰਮਈ ਦਾਲ		lentils boiled in iron ਸਰਬਲੋਹ ਵਿੱਚ ਰਿੱਧੀ ਦਾਲ
saugī ਸਾਉਗੀ	dried grapes	green gram grain ਹਰਾ ਛੋਲੂਆ, ਕਣਕ
savā lakkhăsavā lakkhă faujă ਸਵਾ ਲੱਖ, ਸਵਾ ਲੱਖ ਫੌਜ, ਸਵਾ ਲੱਖ ਖਾਲਸਾ	(army of) 125,000	one, a single Nihang or Sikh ਇੱਕ, ਇੱਕੋ ਨਿਹੰਗ/ਸਿੱਖ
savāiā ਸਵਾਇਆ	one and a quarter	A little ਥੋੜਾ
sāvī ਸਾਵੀ	green	mung bean ਮੁੰਗੀ
sevā karnā ਸੇਵਾ ਕਰਨਾ	to do service	to beat up ਮਾਰ ਕੁਟਾਈ ਕਰਨਾ
sirkhiṇḍī ਸਿਰਖਿੰਡੀ	woman with untied scattered hair	raw sugar ਸ਼ੱਕਰ
sirgumm ਸਿਰਗੁੰਮ, ਸਿਰਘਸ	lost head	a baptized Sikh who has cut his hair ਸਿੰਘ ਜਿਨ ਸਜ ਕੇ ਫਿਰ ਕੇਸ ਕਟਾ ਲਏ ਹੌਣ, ਮੋਨਾ, ਰੋਡਾ
sirghasā ਸਿਰਘਸਾ	head grinder	one who shaves heads ਸਿਰ ਦਾ ਮੁੰਡਨ ਕਰਾਉਣ ਵਾਲਾ, ਰੋਂਡ ਮੋਂਡ
sirjoṛă ਸਿਰਜੋੜ	head joiner	jaggery ਗੁੜ
sirī sāhib, srī sāhib ਸਿਰੀ ਸਾਹਿਬ, ਸ੍ਰੀ ਸਾਹਿਬ	glorious master	large sword ਵੱਡੀ ਤਲਵਾਰ, ਕਿਰਪਾਨ
siroppā ਸਿਰੋਪਾ	robe of honour	a beating ਕੁਟਾਪਾ
siu ਸਿਉ	apple	grafted jujube ਪਿਉਂਦੀ ਬੇਰ
sodhăṇāsodhā deṇā ਸੋਧਣਾ, ਸੋਧਾ ਦੇਣਾ	to apply correction	to punish; to beat ਦੰਡ ਦੇ ਕੇ ਠੀਕ ਕਰਨਾ, ਮਾਂਜਣਾ, ਕੁਟਾਈ ਕਰਕੇ ਸਿੱਧੇ ਰਸਤੇ ਲਿਆਉਣਾ
sūbedār ਸੂਬੇਦਾਰ	governor/warrant officer	sweeper ਝਾੜੂਬਰਦਾਰ, ਗੁੜ
sūbedārnī ਸੂਬੇਦਾਰਨੀ	female subedār	gram flour boiled with buttermilk ਕੜ੍ਹੀ
sucāllā ਸੁਚਾਲਾ	one with a good pace	strider, cripple ਪੁਲਾਂਘ ਮਾਰਕੇ ਚਲਣ ਵਾਲਾ, ਲੰਙਾ
sucettā ਸੁਚੇਤਾ	the act of attending to one's bodily needs, washing, cleaning and dressing, call of nature	act of defecation ਟੱਟੀ ਜਾਣਾ
sujākkhā, sujākkhī ਸੁਜਾਖਾ, ਸਜਾਖੀ	well-sighted	ਛਾਲਣਾ, ਛਾਲਣੀ
sukhdeī ਸੁਖਦੇਈ	woman, bringer of comfort	mattress ਤਲਾਈ, ਗੁਦੈਲੀ
sukhdev siṅghă ਸੁਖਦੇਵ ਸਿੰਘ	a man's name, "Comfort-of-God Singh"	pillow ਸਿਰ੍ਹਾਣਾ
sukhnidhān ਸੁਖਨਿਧਾਨ	treasure-house of comforts and happiness	drink of hemp ਭੰਗ
sukkhā ਸੁੱਖਾ	peace of mind, happiness, pleasurable	Cannabis beverage (bhang), tranquilizer ਭੰਗ
sukkămānjă ਸੁੱਕਮਾਂਜ	vigorously cleaned utensil	hungry ਭੁੱਖਾ
sunahirīā ਸੁਨਹਿਰੀਆ	brother of the gilded cup	A Singh who was baptised at the same time and/or dines from the same plate ਅੰਮ੍ਰਿਤ ਛਕਾ ਕੇ ਪੂਰਨ ਸਰੂਪ ਸਿੱਖ ਸਾਜਣਾ; ਉਹ ਗੁਰਭਾਈ ਜਿਨ੍ਹਾਂ ਇਕੱਠਿਆਂ ਅੰਮਿਤਪਾਨ ਕੀਤਾ ਹੋਵੇ ਜਾਂ ਜੋ ਇੱਕੋ ਵਰਤਨ ਵਿੱਚ ਇਕੱਠੇ ਛਕਦੇ ਹੌਣ ।
sundarī ਸੁੰਦਰੀ	beautiful woman	broom ਝਾੜੂ, ਸੂਹਣ
surgă ਸੁਰਗ	heaven	calamity, sleep ਬਿਪਤਾ, ਨੀਂਦ
surgă duārīā ਸੁਰਗ-ਦੁਆਰੀਆ	at heaven's door	noseless ਨਕਟਾ
surgăvās hoṇā ਸੁਰਗਵਾਸ ਹੋਣਾ	to reside in Heaven	to be sound asleep ਘੂਕ ਸੁੱਤਾ ਹੋਣਾ
sūrmā ਸੂਰਮਾ	(wide-awake) hero, hero, warrior	blind person ਅੰਨ੍ਹਾ
śāh jahāṅ ਸ਼ਾਹ ਜਹਾਂ	Shah Jahan, "king of the world"	poppy plant ਅਫੀਮ ਦਾ ਬੂਟਾ, ਪੋਸਤ ਦਾ ਪੌਦਾ
śahīdă ਸ਼ਹੀਦ	martyr	one who has died for faith ਧਰਮ ਖਾਤਰ ਮਰ ਮਿਟਣ ਵਾਲਾ
śahīdă ganjă ਸ਼ਹੀਦ ਗੰਜ	martyr heap/place	where a Singh is martyred ਜਿੱਥੇ ਸਿੰਘ ਸ਼ਹੀਦ ਹੋਏ ਹੋਣ
śahīdī degă ਸ਼ਹੀਦੀ ਦੇਗ	martyr's cauldron	drink prepared from hemp ਸੁੱਖੇ ਦੀ ਮਿੱਠੀ ਸ਼ਰਦਾਈ
śahīdī faujă ਸ਼ਹੀਦੀ ਫੌਜ	martyrdom army	troop of martyred Singhs ਸਿੰਘਾਂ ਦਾ ਉਹ ਜੱਥਾ ਜਿਨ ਮਰਨਾ ਮਡਿਆ ਹੋਵੇ, ਅਕਾਲ ਪੁਰਖ ਜੀ ਦੀ ਗੁੱਝੀ ਫੌਜ
śahīdī māră ਸ਼ਹੀਦੀ ਮਾਰ	a martyr's beating	punishment to the guilty
śahīdī prasādi ਸ਼ਹੀਦੀ ਪ੍ਰਸਾਦਿ	martyrdom offering	Karah Parshad ਕੜਾਹ ਪ੍ਰਸਾਦਿ
śīś mahal ਸ਼ੀਸ਼ਮਹਿਲ	palace of mirrors, glass palace	shanty, crumbling shack through which the sky peeps ਟੁੱਟਾ ਛੱਪਰ, ਝੁੱਗਾ, ਟੁੱਟੀ ਛੰਨ ਜਿਸ ਅੰਦਰੋਂ ਅਕਾਸ ਦਿੱਸੇ
śer de kann ਸ਼ੇਰ ਦੇ ਕੰਨ	lion's ears	hems of cloth used to strain sukkhā, leaves of Calotropis procera ਸੁੱਖਾ ਪੁਣਨ ਵਾਲ਼ੇ ਪੌਣੇ ਦੇ ਲੜ, ਅੱਕ ਦੇ ਪੱਤੇ
śikărī ਸ਼ਿਕਰੀ		noseclamp, pincers for livestock ਨਕਚੂੰਢੀ, ਚਿਮਟੀ
śikārī ਸ਼ਿਕਾਰੀ	hunter	adulterous man ਵਿਭਚਾਰੀ
ṭahilā ਟਹਿਲਾ	draught made of milk, ghee, almonds, and flour ਘਿਉ ਦਾ ਤੜਕਾ ਲਾ ਕੇ ਬਣੀ ਬਦਾਮਾਂ ਦੀ ਸਰਦਾਈ	
ṭahilūā ਟਹਿਲੂਆ	attendant, servant	rumāl headcloth, seva volunteer ਰੂਮਾਲ, ਸੇਵਾਦਾਰ, ਮੂਹ ਪੈਰ ਸਾਫ਼ ਕਰਨ ਵਾਲਾ ਪਰਨਾ
tahitoṛă ਤਹਿਤੋੜ	torrential downpour	a type of paratha ਪਰਾਉਠਾ
takht ਤਖਤ	throne	one of the Panj Takhts ਗੁਰੁ ਸਾਹਿਬਾਨ ਦੇ ਸਿੰਘਾਸਣ, ਮੁਖ ਪੰਜ ਗੁਰਧਾਮ
ṭāṅgū ਟਾਂਗੂ	from the verb ਟੰਗਣਾ ṭaṅgăṇā meaning "to hang," one that hangs	a lookout or sentinel in a high, concealed location ਉੱਚੀ ਥਾਂ ਜਾਂ ਮਚਾਣ ਬੈਠਾ ਆਦਮੀ ਜੋ ਵੈਰੀ ਦੀ ਖਬਰ ਦਿੰਦਾ ਰਹਿੰਦਾ ਹੈ
tar pulaw, tar pulāo	aromatic gravied rice, juicy dish of rice	dry bread or meal ਬਿਨਾਂ ਸਲੂਣੇ ਦੇ ਰੁੱਖੀ-ਸੁੱਖੀ ਰੋਟੀ
tankhāh ਤਨਖਾਹ	salary	penalty for breach of religious code ਧਾਰਮਿਕ ਉਕਾਈ ਕਾਰਣ ਲੱਗਾ ਦੰਡ/ਡੰਡ; ਗ਼ੁਨਾਹਗਾਰ ਸਿੱਖ ਨੂੰ ਲਾਈ ਜਾਣ ਵਾਲੀ ਸਜ਼ਾ
tankhāhīā ਤਨਖਾਹੀਆ	salaried	one subject to a penalty for breach of religious code ਜੋ ਰਹਿਤ ਮਰਿਆਦਾ ਦੀ ਉਕਾਈ ਕਾਰਣ ਡੰਡ ਦਾ ਭਾਗੀ ਹੋਵੇ
tattā ਤੱਤਾ	heated	Turk ਤੁਰਕ
tattă khālsā ਤੱਤ ਖਾਲਸਾ	true khalsa, Tat Khalsa	Sikh who abides firmly by the Sikh code ਸਿੱਖੀ ਰਹਿਤ ਅਨੁਸਾਰ ਤਿਆਰ ਬਰ ਤਿਆਰ ਸਿੰਘ, ਦਸਮੇਸ਼ ਦੀ ਰਹਿਤ ਉਨਸਾਰ ਚੱਲਣ ਵਾਲਾ
tehsīldār ਤਹਿਸੀਲਦਾਰ	tax official of a tehsil (administrative unit)	intelligent, clever ਹੁਸ਼ਿਆਰ, ਖਚਰਾ
tejā siṅghă ਤੇਜਾ ਸਿੰਘ	a man's name, meaning "brilliant/radiant/lightning" Singh	train engine ਰੇਲ ਗੱਡੀ ਦਾ ਇੰਞਣ
ṭhākkară ਠਾਕਰ	lord, master, owner	scrotum ਅੰਡਕੋਸ਼
ṭhāṇedāră, thāṇedāră ਠਾਣੇਦਾਰ / ਥਾਣੇਦਾਰ	station house officer	donkey ਖੋਤਾ, ਗਧਾ (Note: reflecting a "carefree disregard for worldly authorities, which the police represent")
ṭhīkkară ਠੀਕਰ	shell, broken piece of pottery	body ਸਰੀਰ, ਦੇਹ, ਦੇਹੀ
ṭhīkarī ਠੀਕਰੀ	shard, empty crust	coin, rupee ਰੁਪਈਆ/ਪੈਸਾ
ṭhippară ਠਿੱਪਰ	dialectal word for turnip	turnip ਗੋਂਗਲੂ
tiār bar tiār ਤਿਆਰ ਬਰ ਤਿਆਰ, ਤਿਆਰ ਸਭ ਤਿਆਰ	fully prepared	fully abiding by the Sikh code of conduct, armed ਸਿੰਘ ਰਹਿਤ ਮਰਿਆਦਾ ਵਿੱਚ ਪੂਰਣ, ਸ਼ਸਤਰ ਧਾਰੀ, ਰਹਿਤ ਵਿੱਚ ਪੱਕਾ
timar laṅgīā ਤਿਮਰ ਲੰਗੀਆ	Tamerlane	clubfooted, crippled ਡੁੱਡਾ, ਲੰਙਾ
tiṭaṅgī ਤਿਟੰਗੀ	three-legged	Gayatri ਗਾਇਤਰੀ
tittară ਤਿੱਤਰ	partridge	bitter melon, Momordica charantia ਕਰੇਲਾ
toṛā ਤੋੜਾ	gun fuse; beam or rafter	firearm strap ਬੰਦੁਕ ਦਾ ਫੀਤਾ, ਦੁਮਾਲੇ ਤੇ ਸਜਾਉਣ ਵਾਲੀ ਸਰਬਲੋਹ ਦੀ ਸੰਗਲੀ
toṛā jhāṛnā ਤੋੜਾ ਝਾੜਨਾ	to shake off gun fuse; beam or rafter	to fire a firearm ਬੰਦੂਕ ਚਲਾਉਣਾ
ṭukkar ਟੁੱਕਰ	piece of bread	royal estate ਸ਼ਾਹੀ ਜਗੀਰ
turk ਤੁਰਕ	Turk	Muslim ਮੁਸਲਮਾਨ
turk bakkarī ਤੁਰਕ ਬੱਕਰੀ	Turk's goat	prostitute ਕੰਜਰੀ
turat pulāu ਤੁਰਤ ਪਲਾਉ	instant rice	ground salt and pepper ਰਗੜਿਆ ਲੂਣ ਮਿਰਚ, ਚਟਣੀ
uḍaṇăkhaṭolā ਉਡਣਖਟੋਲਾ	glider or sailplane that flies using air currents	cart ਗੱਡਾ
ugarāhī ਉਗਰਾਹੀ	collection	begging ਪਿੰਨਣਾ, ਭਿੱਖ੍ਯਾ, ਗਜਾ ਕਰਨਾ
ujāgară ਉਜਾਗਰ	well-known, manifest, shining	earthen lamp ਦੀਵਾ
ujāgarī ਉਜਾਗਰੀ	well-known, manifest, shining (diminutive), awareness	lantern ਲਾਲਟੈਣ
vaḍḍă bābbā ਵੱਡ ਬਾਬਾ	"big father," an elder, a grandfather ਵਡੇਰਾ, ਦਾਦਾ	largest copy of the Guru Granth Sahib opened on the upper story of the Darbar Sahib ਗੁਰੂ ਗ੍ਰੰਥ ਸਾਹਿਬ ਜੀ ਦੀ ਸੱਭ ਤੋਂ ਵੱਡੀ ਬੀੜ, ਜਿਹੜੀ ਦਰਬਾਰ ਸਾਹਿਬ ਦੀ ਉਤਲੇਰੀ ਮਜਲ ਤੇ ਖੋਲ੍ਹੀਦੈ
vahīră ਵਹੀਰ	procession ਕਾਫ਼ਲਾ	mobile camp ਸਿੰਘਾਂ ਦਾ ਫਿਰਨ ਤੁਰਨ ਵਿਚਰਨ ਵਾਲਾ ਜੱਥਾ
vahīră pāuṇā ਵਹੀਰ ਪਾਉਣਾ	to do a procession	to march ਕੂਚ ਕਰਨੀ
vahīrīā ਵਹੀਰੀਆ	member of a procession	participant or leader of a mobile camp ਵਹੀਰ ਦਾ ਮੈਂਬਰ, ਜੱਥੇਦਾਰ
vakīlă ਵਕੀਲ	lawyer, advocate	big stick
valait pās ਵਲੈਤ ਪਾਸ	one who passed through foreign lands	one who has been to jail ਜੇਲ ਯਾਤਰਾ ਆਦਿ
vartāvā ਵਰਤਾਵਾ	one who distributes food at events	large ladle ਕੜਛਾ
vihlā sir ਵਿਹਲਾ ਸਿਰ	idle, vacant head	one who does not keep kes ਜਿਸਦੇ ਸਿਰੇ ਕੇਸ ਨਾ ਹੋਣ
vīră ਵੀਰ	brave	brother

== See also ==
- Chardi kala
- Punjabi language
- Punjabi dialects and languages
- Sant Bhasha
