= Chaubis Avtar =

Composition

- Dasam Granth
- ← Gian Prabodh Brahma Avtar →
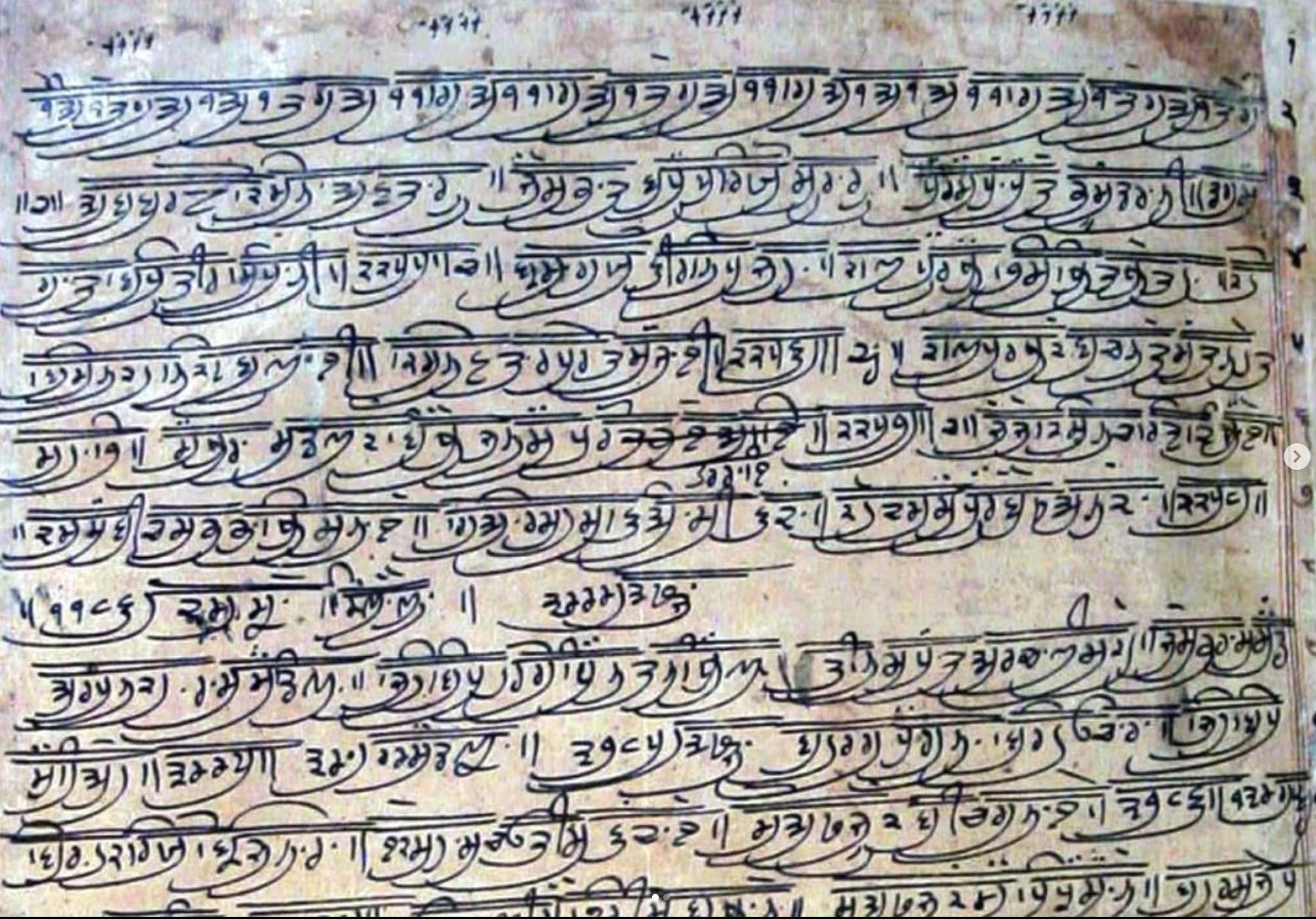
- Beginning part of the Krishna Avtar composition (part of the Chaubis Avtar section) of the Dasam Granth in the penmanship of Guru Gobind Singh.

Information
- Religion: Sikhism
- Author: Guru Gobind Singh
- Period: 1688–1698
- Chapters: 24
- Verses: 5571

Chaubis Avtar (Punjabi: ਚੌਬੀਸ ਅਵਤਾਰ, lit. 'the twenty four incarnations', pronunciation: [t͡ʃɔbiːs äːʋt̪aɾ]) is a composition in Dasam Granth containing history of 24 incarnations (avatars) of Vishnu. The chapter is positioned after the Chandi Charitras and after it follows Brahma Avtar and Rudra Avtar. The text was written to explain Sikh theology using existing pre-existing religious and regional culture.

== Synopsis ==
It is traditionally and historically attributed to Guru Gobind Singh. However, the opening lines of the work use a pen-name of Siām, which some argue was one of the court poets of the Guru whilst others believe it was one of the Guru's pen-names. The composition covers 30% of the Dasam Granth containing 5571 verses with longest sub compositions being Krishna Avtar and Rama avtar, having 2492 and 864 verses each. The Kalki avtar chapter contains 588 verses.

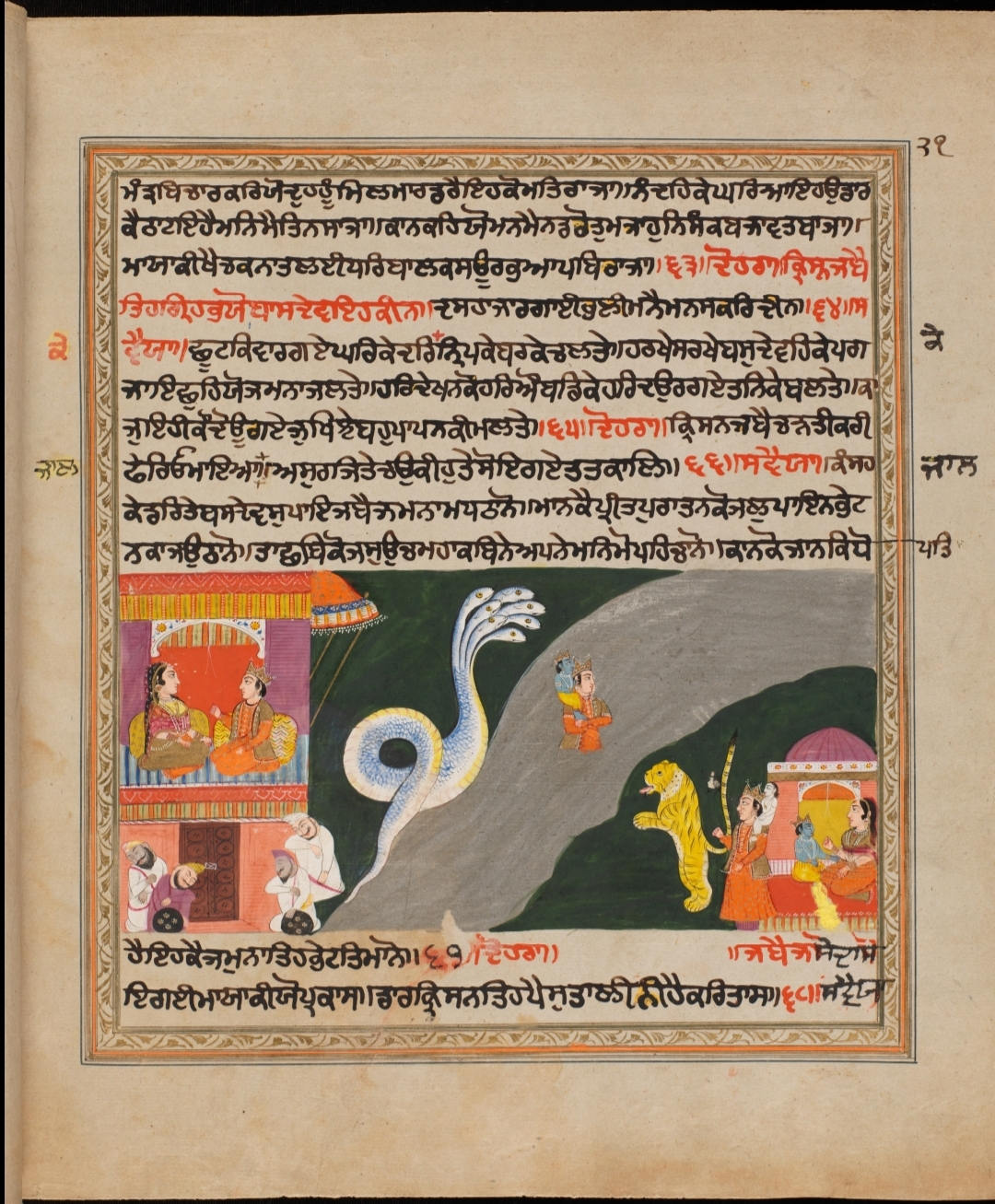
Page from a Dasam Granth manuscript showing Krishna and Vasnudev

The Chaubis Avtar is part of all five known major historical variants of Dasam Granth, but they are sequenced differently in these editions.

The text is notable for naming Jaina Arihanta as an avatar of Vishnu who practiced asceticism, forbade Yajna and Himsa. The text names Buddha as the 23rd avatar of Vishnu, adds Brahma also as avatar of Vishnu, the last two in a manner similar to the Puranas tradition of Hinduism. However, unlike many regional Hindu texts, the Chaubis Avtar avatar mentions many more Vishnu avatars. It also is unique in that it lists Brahma, Shiva, and Mahidi as avatars of Vishnu, which differentiates it from other works of literature on the avatars of Vishnu, whom generally do not list these entities as one of Vishnu's incarnations. The verses and composition is martial, stating that avatar of Vishnu appears in the world to restore good and defeat evil, but asserts that these avatars are not God, but agents of the God that is never born nor dies. The predominant part of the text is in Braj language of north India.

Chandi is eulogized at various points in the work of literature, such as at the beginning between verses no.5–8. The deity Krishna is stated to be a devotee of Chandi himself in the text and that he recites hymns praising Durga, such as the Durga Saptasati, after a morning ritual bath and offering.

As per verse no.3 of the text, Kal is responsible for the dispatching and destruction of the avatars. Most accounts of the various avatars are condensed to a short description of brevity in the work.

The composition itself states on verse no.861 that it was "completed on the bank of the Sutlej River on the base of Naina Devi".

The text claims it was written for the purpose of espousing the tenets of dharamyudh. Some sections retell tales from Indic literature very briefly, such as the story from the Ramayana of Rām killing a Shudra who was practicing austerities that endangered the life of a Brahmin's son, which is retold in the Ram Avtar section of the Chaubis Avtar chapter in only two sentences, not including further discussion, unlike the original tale told in the Ramayana.

=== Rejection of preexisting religious paradigms ===
Various quotations from the text reject the religions of Hindus and Muslims:

Since I grabbed hold of your feet, I lower my eyes before no one else.

The Puranas speak of Ram, and the Qur'an of Rahim, but I don't believe in either of them.

The Smrtis, the Shastras [Śāstras], the Vedas, all proclaim various mysteries, but I do not recognize a single one of them.

O Revered Sword-Bearing Lord [asipāni], it was through your grace that this story was told.

— Guru Gobind Singh, Chaubis Avtar (Ram Avtar section), verse no.863

The text further states:

I will not first honor Ganesha [Ganesa], nor do I ever meditate upon Krishna or Vishnu (kisan bisan).

I have heard of but do not recognize them. I am absorbed in contemplation at His feet. (434)

Mahakal is my protector....

— Guru Gobind Singh, Chaubis Avtar (Krishna Avtar section), verse no.434

== List of 24 Avatars ==
Guru Gobind Singh gives the life account of following Avatars in the composition:

1. Mach Avtar
2. Kacch Avtar
3. Nar Avtar
4. Narayan Avtar
5. Maha Mohini Avtar
6. Bairah Avtar
7. Narasingh Avtar
8. Bavan Avtar
9. Parasram Avtar
10. Brahma Avtar
11. Rudra Avtar
12. Jalandhar Avtar
13. Bisan (Dattatreya) Avtar
14. Bisan Avtar
15. Arihant Dev (Rishabh Dev) Avtar
16. Manu Raja Avtar
17. Dhanantar Vaid Avtar
18. Suraj Avtar
19. Chandra Avtar
20. Ram Avtar
21. Krishna Avtar
22. Nar (Arjuna) Avtar
23. Baudh Avtar
24. Nihkalanki (Kalki) Avtar

== Historicity ==
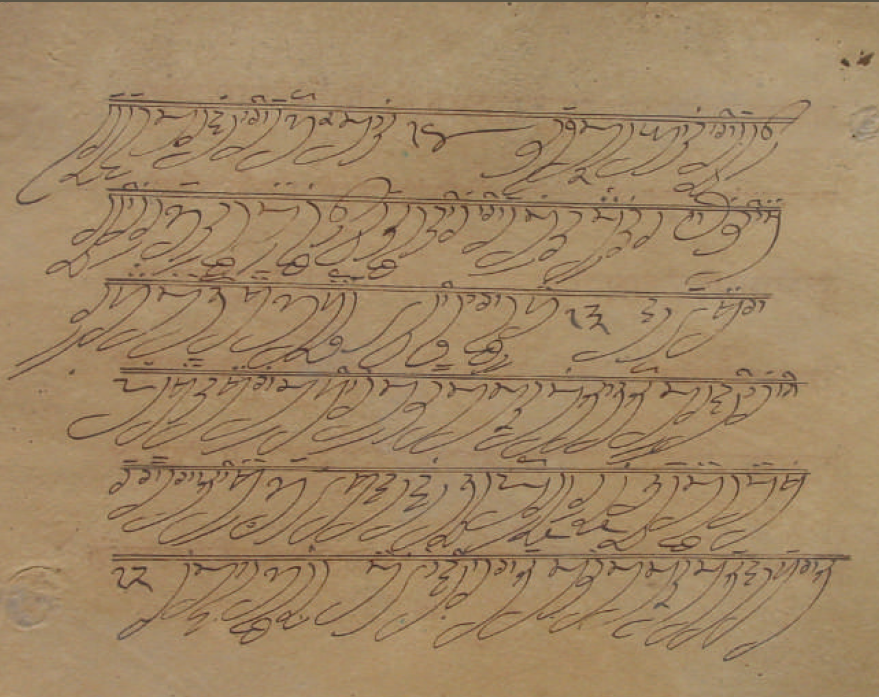
Chaubis Avtar in the Hand of Guru Gobind Singh - the 'Mach Avatar' Section

Per internal references of Dasam Granth, Krishna Avtar was composed in Vikram Samvat 1745/ 1688 AD at Paonta Sahib when Guru Gobind Singh was residing there where Rama Avtar was finished at Anandpur Sahib in 1755 VS/1698 AD.

Following are historical references of 18th century serves as evidences that Guru Gobind Singh had written this composition at Anandpur as well as at Paunta Sahib:

- Letter to Mata Sundri, Bhai Mani Singh: The letter was written by Bhai Mani Singh to Mata Sundri, after 5 years of demise of Guru Gobind Singh. This manuscript provides evidence of writing of Krishna Avtar by Guru Gobind Singh also includes 303 Charitars and Shastar Nam Mala. This manuscript was written before compilation of dasam granth during collections of various compositions. Among critics Gyani Harnam Singh Balabh believes that only 303 Charitars were written by Guru Gobind Singh among 404 Charitars in Charitropakhyan.
- Parchi Gobind Singh - Bava Sevadas: This manuscript was finished sometime in the second quarter of the eighteenth century (around 1741) by Seva Das, an Udasi. He mentioned famous quote from Rama Avtar, a composition within Chaubis Avtar.
- Mahima Parkash, Sarup Das Bhalla: This book was completed by Sarup Das, who belonged to lineage of Guru Amar Das, in 1776. He had access to the complete Dasam Granth and mentioned that Chaubis Avtar was written by Guru Gobind Singh.

== Controversies ==
- Mahima Parkash, Sarup Das Bhalla: This book was completed by Sarup Das, who belonged to lineage of Guru Amar Das, in 1776. He had access to the complete Dasam Granth and He mentions that many texts including 4 Vedas, 18 Puranas, 6 Smriti/Shastar, Chaubis Avtar and 404 chartiras were among various texts translated by scholars to Gurmukhi script. After all the Sanskrit Language was translated and recited to Guru Gobind Singh, Guru Gobind Singh was happy and then everything added to the Vidya Sagar Granth:

Full text below:

ਦੋਹਰਾ॥
ਬੇਦ ਬਿਦਿਆ ਪ੍ਰਕਾਸ਼ ਕੋ ਸੰਕਲਪ ਧਰਿਓ ਮਨ ਦਿਆਲ ॥
ਪੰਡਤ ਪੁਰਾਨ ਇੱਕਤ੍ਰ ਕਰ ਭਾਖਾ ਰਚੀ ਬਿਸਾਲ ॥

ਚੋਪਈ॥
ਆਗਿਆ ਕੀਨੀ ਸਤਗੁਰ ਦਿਆਲਾ ॥
ਬਿਦਿਆਵਾਨ ਪੰਡਤ ਲੇਹੁ ਭਾਲ ॥
ਜੋ ਜਿਸ ਬਿਦਾਆ ਗਿਆਤਾ ਹੋਇ ॥
ਵਹੀ ਪੁਰਾਨ ਸੰਗ ਲਿਆਵੇ ਸੋਇ ॥
ਦੇਸ ਦੇਸ ਕੋ ਸਿਖ ਚਲਾਏ ॥
ਪੰਡਤ ਪੁਰਾਨ ਸੰਗਤਿ ਲਿਆਏ ॥
ਬਾਨਾਰਸ ਆਦ ਜੋ ਬਿਦਿਆ ਠੌਰਾ ॥

ਪੰਡਤ ਸਭ ਬਿਦਿਆ ਸਿਰਮੌਰਾ ॥
ਸਤਿਗੁਰ ਕੇ ਆਇ ਇਕਤ੍ਰ ਸਭ ਭਏ ॥
ਬਹੁ ਆਦਰ ਸਤਗੁਰ ਜੀ ਦਏ ॥
ਮਿਰਜਾਦਾਬਾਧ ਖਰਚ ਕੋ ਦਇਆ ॥
ਖੇਦ ਬਿਭੇਦ ਕਾਹੂ ਨਹੀਂ ਭਇਆ ॥
ਗੁਰਮੁਖੀ ਲਿਖਾਰੀ ਨਿਕਟ ਬੁਲਾਏ ॥
ਤਾ ਕੋ ਸਭ ਬਿਧ ਦਈ ਬਣਾਏ ॥
ਕਰ ਭਾਖਾ ਲਿਖੋ ਗੁਰਮੁਖੀ ਭਾਇ ॥
ਮੁਨਿਮੋ ਕੋ ਦੇਹੁ ਕਥਾ ਸੁਨਾਇ ॥

ਦੋਹਰਾ ॥
ਨਨੂਆ ਬੈਰਾਗੀ ਸ਼ਿਆਮ ਕਬ ਬ੍ਰਹਮ ਭਾਟ ਜੋ ਆਹਾ ॥
ਭਈ ਨਿਹਚਲ ਫਕੀਰ ਗੁਰ ਬਡੇ ਗੁਨਗ ਗੁਨ ਤਾਹਾ॥
ਅਵਰ ਕੇਤਕ ਤਿਨ ਨਾਮ ਨ ਜਾਨੋ ॥
ਲਿਖੇ ਸਗਲ ਪੁਨਿ ਕਰੇ ਬਿਖਾਨੋ ॥
ਚਾਰ ਬੇਦ ਦਸ ਅਸ਼ਟ ਪੁਰਾਨਾ ॥
ਛੈ ਸਾਸਤ੍ਰ ਸਿਮ੍ਰਤ ਆਨਾ ॥

ਚੋਪਈ॥
ਚੋਬਿਸ ਅਵਤਾਰ ਕੀ ਭਾਖਾ ਕੀਨਾ॥
ਚਾਰ ਸੋ ਚਾਰ ਚਲਿਤ੍ਰ ਨਵੀਨਾ॥
ਭਾਖਾ ਬਣਾਈ ਪ੍ਰਭ ਸ੍ਰਵਣ ਕਰਾਈ॥
ਭਏ ਪ੍ਰਸੰਨ ਸਤਗੁਰ ਮਨ ਭਾਈ॥
ਸਭ ਸਹੰਸਕ੍ਰਿਤ ਭਾਖਾ ਕਰੀ ॥
ਬਿਦਿਆ ਸਾਗਰ ਗ੍ਰਿੰਥ ਪਰ ਚੜੀ ॥

- Chaubees Avtar: Inside Chaubees Avtar, first page mentions that Kavi Shyam is narrating this as per his understanding.

ਬਰਨਤ ਸ੍ਯਾਮ ਜਥਾਮਤਿ ਭਾਈ॥੧॥
Barnta Saiaam Jathaamti Bhaaeee॥1॥
The poet Shyam is narrating it according or his own under-standing.1.
੨੪ ਅਵਤਾਰ ਮੱਛ - ੧/(੪) - ਸ੍ਰੀ ਦਸਮ ਗ੍ਰੰਥ ਸਾਹਿਬ

Further in the Chheera Samuaandar Mathan, there is reference to Poet Shyam:

ਕਬਿ ਸ੍ਯਾਮ ਕਵਿਤਨ ਮਧਿ ਕਥਿਯੋ॥
Kabi Saiaam Kavitan Madhi Kathiyo॥
Both the gods and demons unitedly churned the ocean, which hath been narrated in verse by the poet Shyam.
੨੪ ਅਵਤਾਰ ਸਮੁੰਦ੍ਰ ਮਥਨ - ੧/੨ - ਸ੍ਰੀ ਦਸਮ ਗ੍ਰੰਥ ਸਾਹਿਬ

== Relation with Puranas ==
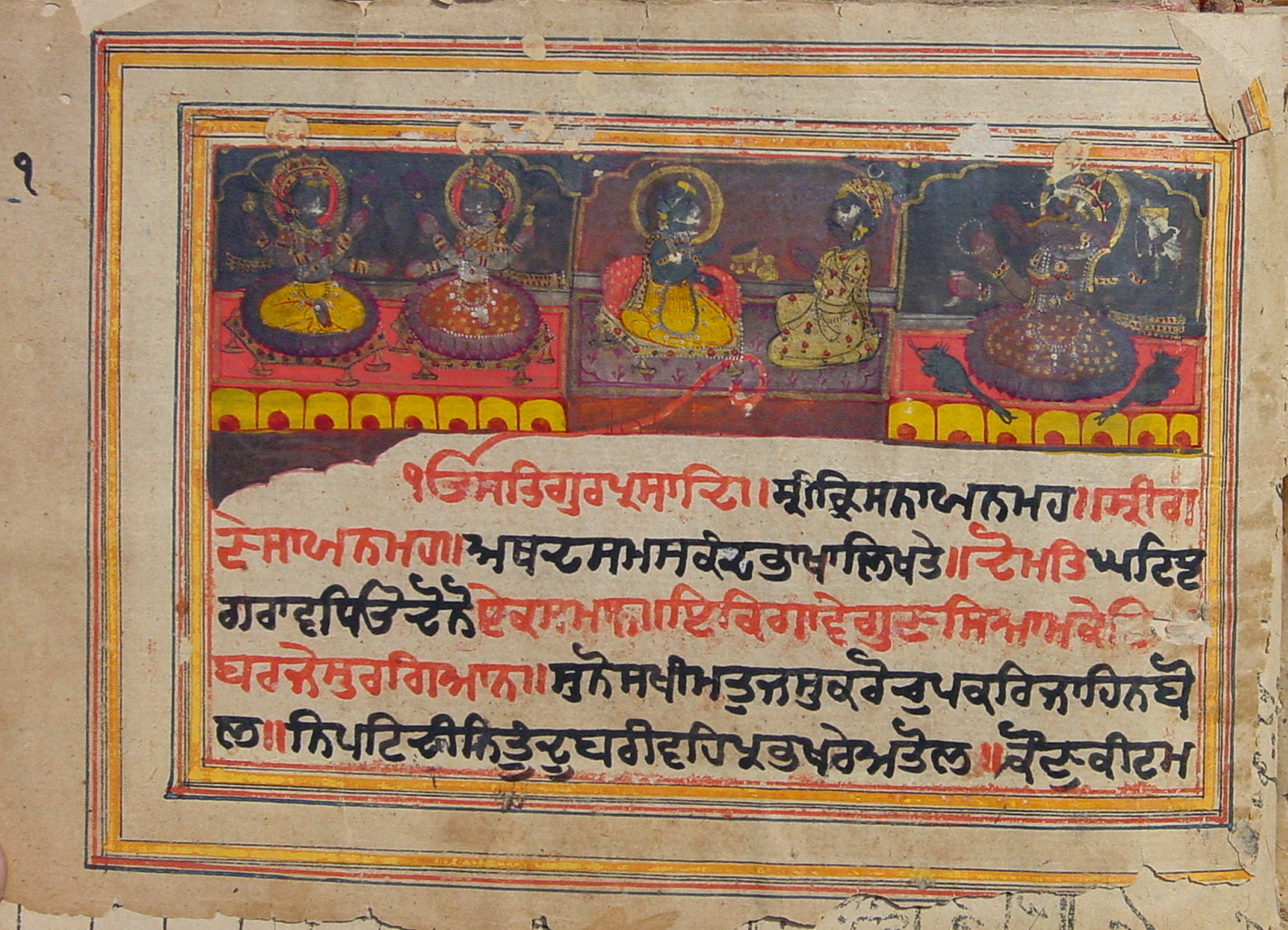
Illustrated folio of an 18th century Bhagavata Purana manuscript written in Gurmukhi.

The major difference between the Puranas and Chaubis Avtar is that Chaubis Avtar believes in monotheism. It preaches almighty is beyond Birth and treats all incarnations as agents working for God.

Krishna Avtar was written on the basis of the Dasam Skand of Srimad Bhagwat Puran, with many sanctifications and comments by poet.

Among different versions of Ramayana, Guru Gobind Singh also wrote his version under the title Rama Avtar.

== Reception ==
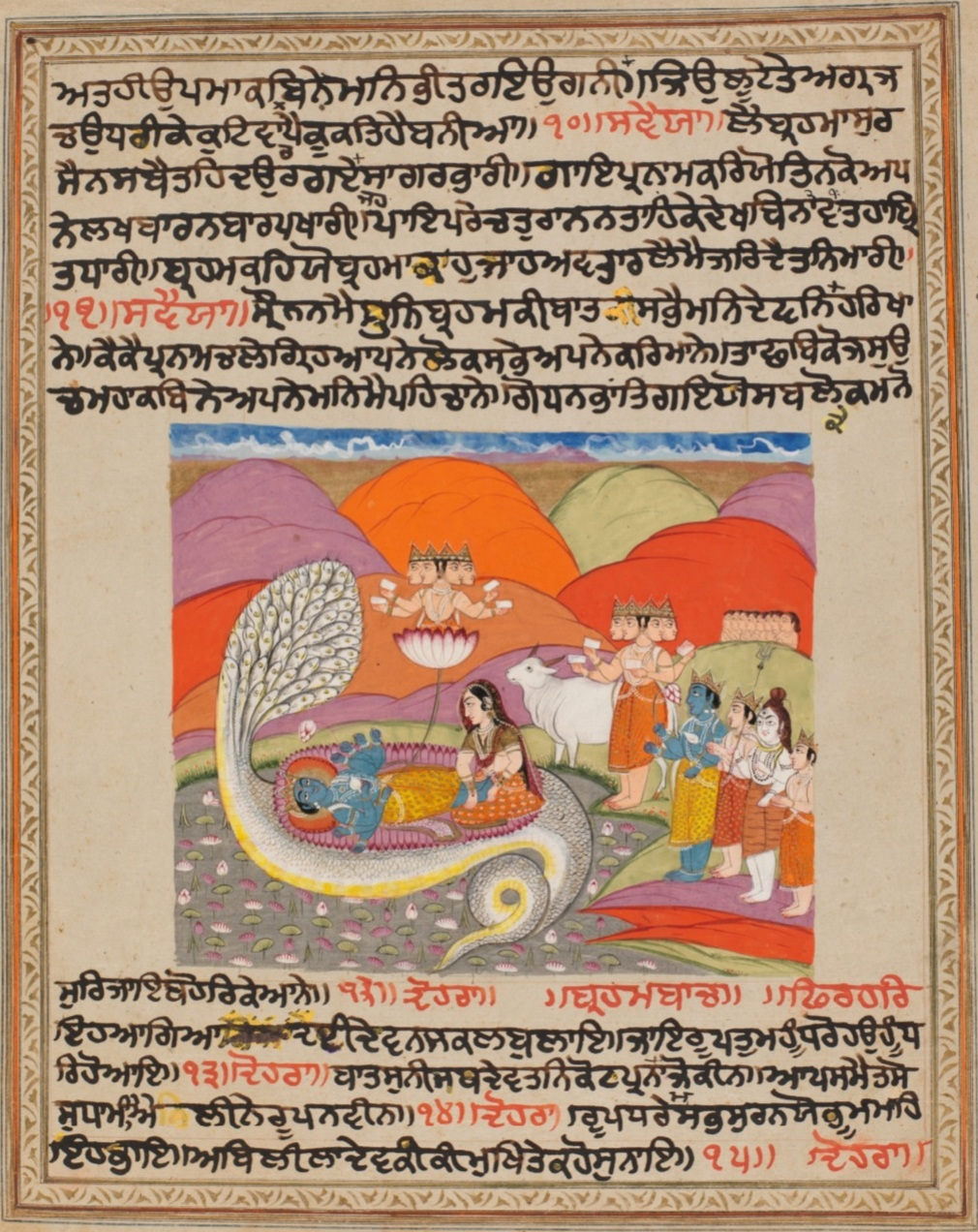
Illustrated page from an old Dasam Granth codex

The two avatars of Vishnu, Rama and Krishna, comprise the longest part of the Chaubis Avtar. Modern era scholars state that verse 863 of the Rama Avatar section of the text rejects worship of particular gods, reject the scriptures of both Hinduism and Islam, and instead reveres the "Sword-bearing lord" (Asipani). The verse, translates Robin Rinehart, states, "Since I grabbed hold of your feet, I lower my eyes before no one else. The Puranas speak of Ram, and the Quran of Rahim, but I don't believe in either of them". Similarly, in verse 434 of Krishna Avatar of the text reveres Mahakal, and asserts that "I will not first honor Ganesha", nor meditate of Krishna or Vishnu, and "I am absorbed in contemplation of His feet. Mahakal is my protector." The verses in the text, states Rinehart, praise Hindu goddesses (Devi) such as Chandi and Durga.

The framework of the Devi-related verses in the text, according to Harjot Oberoi, are the 6th-century Devi Mahatmya and the 12th-century Devi-Bhagavata Purana Hindu texts, which describe and revere the divine feminine. The theological import, states Oberoi, is not about deity reincarnation, but accepting the masculine and feminine dimension of Ultimate Reality. These verses on fierce goddesses Durga and Chandi have been interpreted in martial context, by many Sikh commentators, as meant to symbolize sword and to inspire Sikh warriors heading into battle during the Mughal Empire persecution.

== See also ==
- Rama in Sikhism
