= Chardi kala =

Sikh term for aspiring to maintain a mental state of eternal optimism

In Sikhism, Chardi Kala (Gurmukhi: ਚੜ੍ਹਦੀ ਕਲਾ caṛhadī kalā) or Charhdi Kala, is the Punjabi term for aspiring to maintain a mental state of eternal resilience, optimism and joy; an acceptance that life ebbs and flows with hardship and to rise above that adversity. Sikhs are ideally expected to be in this positive state of mind as a sign of their contentment with the will of God (bhana), even during times of suffering.

== Description ==
Chardi Kala can be translated as "positive attitude" or "ascending energy". It is also described as being in "high spirits" or “positive, buoyant and optimistic” attitude to life and to the future. Chardi kala is the state of mind in which a person has no negative emotions like fear, jealousy or enmity. Instead the mind has many positive feelings including joy, satisfaction and self-dignity.

Sikhs believe in the will of God (hukam). They also believe that God is without enemies (nirvair), and is always merciful. Hence, humans should accept his will even at times one suffers severe hardship and strive to work through it, to the betterment of others. Thus, chardi kala is the indicator of a Sikh's absolute faith in the Akal Purakh (The Timeless God). This attitude allows one to face the hardships with as little harm as possible. This also involves joining and helping others in their hour of need.

== Popular culture ==
In 2021, the Punjabi poet and singer Bir Singh launched a song called Charhdikala, which celebrates the resilience and strength of the farmers during the 2020-2021 protests.

== See also ==
- Khalsa bole
