= Rama in Sikhism =

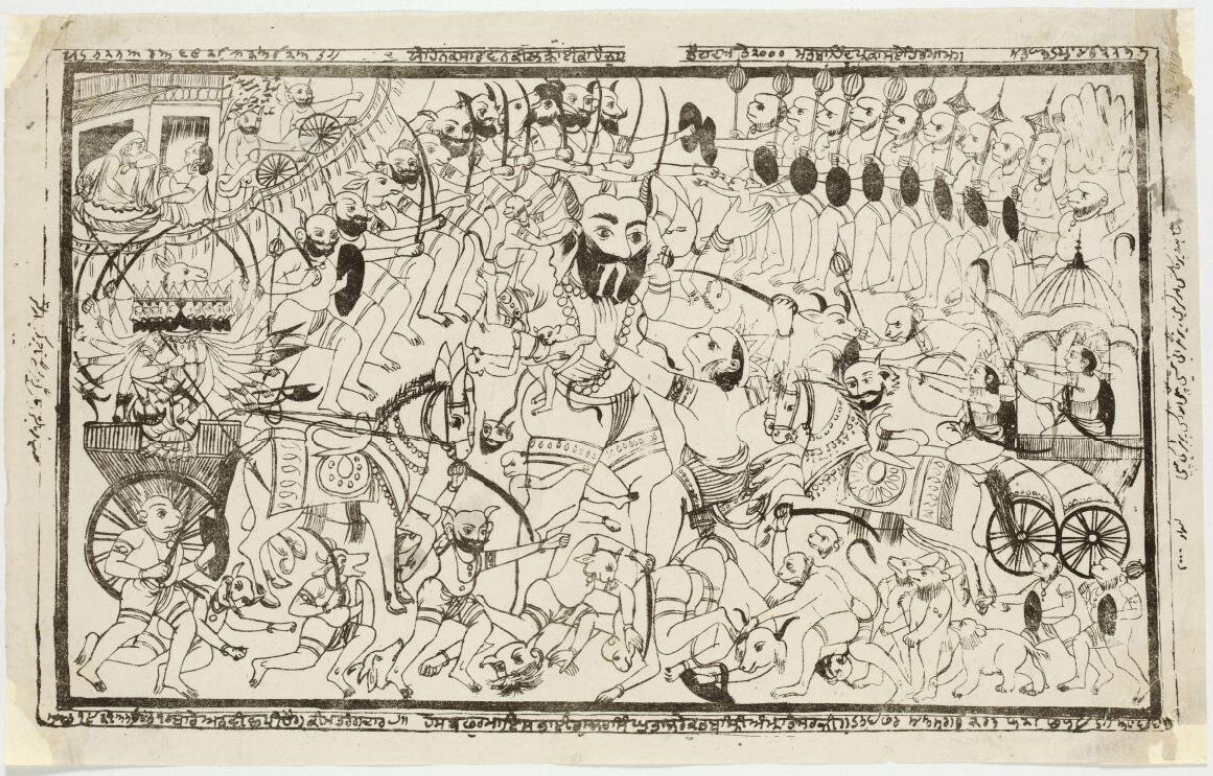
Sikh woodcut of a battle scene from the Ramayana, Lahore or Amritsar, about 1870

Rama (Punjabi: ਰਾਮ (Gurmukhi)), known as Ram Avatar (ਰਾਮ ਅਵਤਾਰ) (Note: Rama is described as Ram Avatar in the Dasam Granth by the 10th Sikh guru, Guru Gobind Singh.(Singh (Guru) 2005, p. 7)) or Raja Ram (ਰਾਜਾ ਰਾਮ), is considered an important figure in Sikhism, due to his inclusion as one among the 24 incarnations of Vishnu in the Chaubis Avtar, a composition in the Dasam Granth traditionally and historically attributed to Guru Gobind Singh. The discussion of Rama and Krishna is the most extensive in this section of the secondary Sikh scripture. The composition is martial, stating that the avatar of Vishnu appears in the world to restore good and defeat evil, but asserts that these avatars are not God, but agents of the God. God is beyond birth and death. The famous Savaiya and Dohra from the Rehras Sahib, read daily by devout Sikhs, comes from Ram Avatar Bani. However, it is not to be confused with Sikhs believing or worshipping Raja Ram or Krishan. It is clear from Guru Gobind Singh's verses in Chaupai Sahib, a part of Sikh Nitnem, or daily prayer.

There have been claims that the Ram in Sikhism is not related to the Rama described in the Ramayana. In Guru Granth Sahib, there are differences between Ram Chander (ਰਾਮ ਚੰਦਰ), the king of Ayodhya, and Ram, the all-prevailing God.

== Sources ==
=== Guru Granth Sahib ===
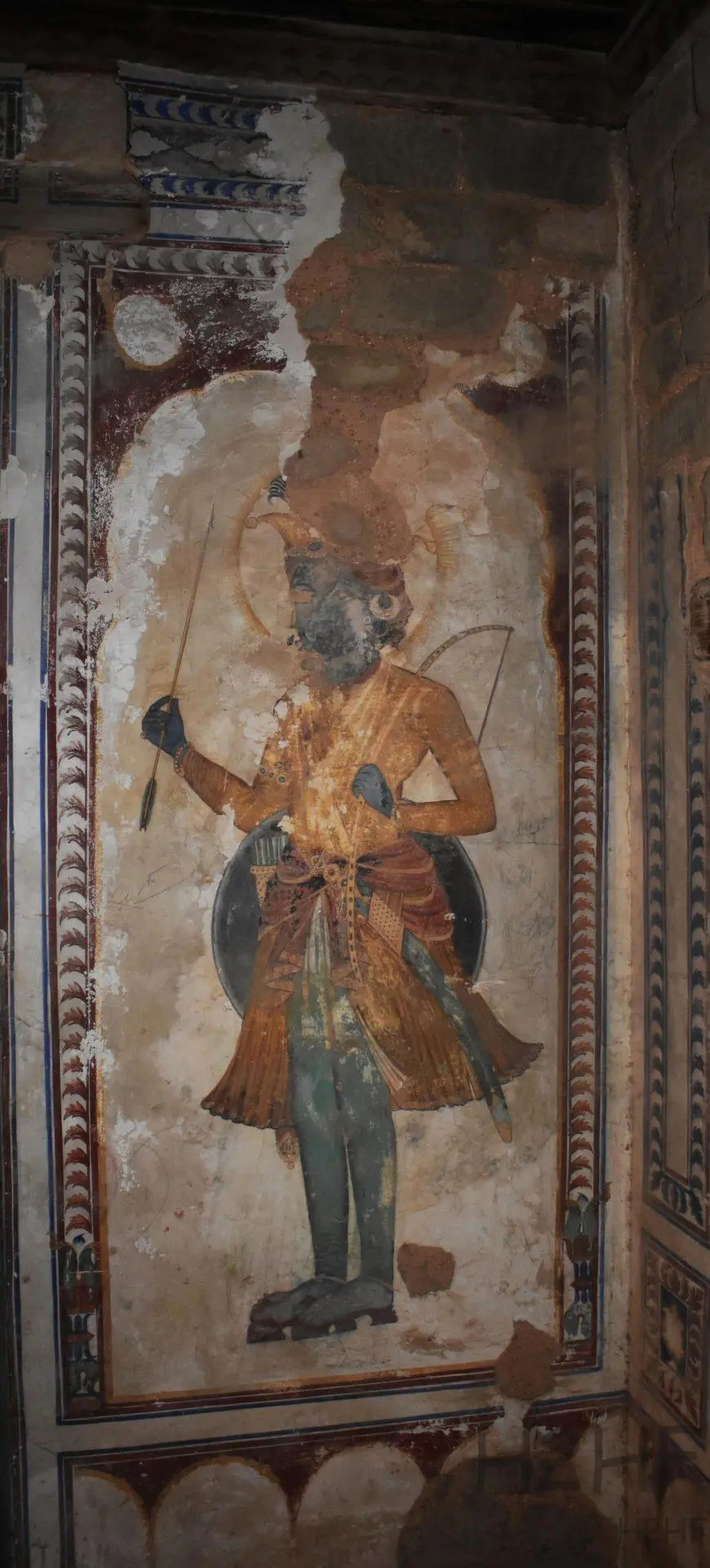
Fresco of Ram Chandar from the haveli of Khem Singh Bedi, ca.1850–1890

The word Rama (ˈraːmɐ) appears in the Guru Granth Sahib more than 2,500 times. Guru Nanak rejected the concept of divine incarnation as present in Hinduism but used words such as Ram, Mohan, Hari & Shiv as ways of referring to the divine together with Islamic words like Allah & Khuda. Bhagat Kabir makes it clear that there is a difference between Ram Chander (King of Ayodhya) and Ram (the all prevailing God).

Kabeer, it does make a difference, how you chant the Lord's name, 'Raam'. This is something to consider. Everyone uses the same word for the son of Dasrath and the wondrous Lord. Kabeer, use the word 'Raam', only to speak of the all-pervading Lord. You must make that distinction.

— Guru Granth Sahib 1374

=== Dasam Granth ===
Rama is mentioned as one among the 24 incarnations of Vishnu in the Chaubis Avtar, a composition in Dasam Granth traditionally and historically attributed to Guru Gobind Singh. (Note: Beesvan Ram Avtar Kathan or Ram Avtar is a composition in the second sacred Granth of Sikhs i.e. Dasam Granth, which was written by Guru Gobind Singh, at Anandpur Sahib. Guru Gobind Singh was not a worshiper of Sri Rama, as after describing the whole Avtar he cleared this fact that ਰਾਮ ਰਹੀਮ ਪੁਰਾਨ ਕੁਰਾਨ ਅਨੇਕ ਕਹੈਂ ਮਤ ਏਕ ਨ ਮਾਨਯੋ॥. Ram Avtar is based on Ramayana, but a Sikh studies the spiritual aspects of this whole composition.) Although the compositions of the Dasam Granth are traditionally accepted to be written by Guru Gobind Singh, there have been questions of the authenticity of the entirety of Dasam Granth from time of compilation.

== Importance ==
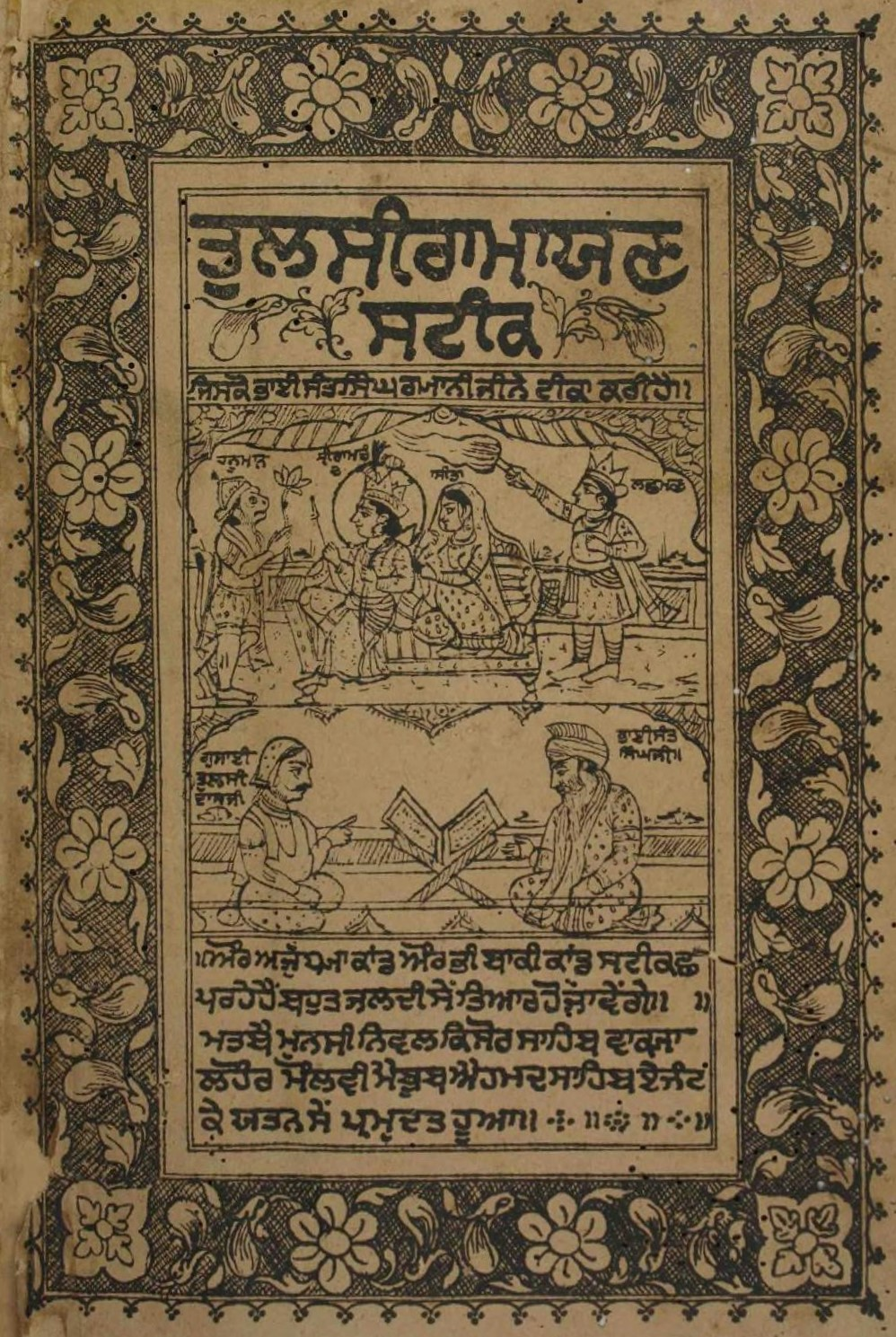
Illustrated page from a Ramcharitmanas commentary by Giani Sant Singh (former head granthi of Harmandir Sahib)

Rama is often depicted in Sikh myths as a source of inner peace, inspiration and bravery.

=== Ram Mandir ===
As per Rajinder Singh, a Sikh expert who was consulted by the five-member bench Court in the Ram Mandir case and was described in the judgement as "a person having an interest in the study of religious, cultural and historical books of a Sikh cult", the founder of Sikhism, Guru Nanak, took a pilgrimage to the Ram Janmabhoomi in c. 1520. The judgement also states that Rajinder Singh attached various janam sakhis to support his statements. Others have discredited the statements of Rajinder Singh on the basis of the janam sakhis attached dating from 18th century and later, which is stated to be a time period when Brahminical revivalism became evident in such works. The SGPC passed a resolution condemning this verdict. Sikh scholars have the view that Guru Nanak went to religious sites like Mecca and Ayodhya to preach and spread his message rather than for pilgrimage.

== See also ==
- Hinduism and Sikhism
- Rama in Jainism
- Chaubis Avtar

== Sources ==
=== References ===
- Singh (Guru), Gobind (2005). The Dasam Granth. Munshiram Manoharlal Publishers. ISBN 978-81-215-1044-8.
- ਜਪਜੀ [Japji]. Translated by Swami, Rama. University of Michigan: Himalayan Institute of Yoga. 2013 [1987]. pp. 8–87. ISBN 9-780-893-89107-7.
- Mehta, Ved (1996). Rajiv Gandhi and Rama's Kingdom. New Haven, Connecticut: Yale University Press. pp. 28–124. ISBN 9-780-300-06858-0.
- Jakobsh, Doris R. (2010). Sikhism and Women. Oxford: Oxford University Press. pp. 40–47. ISBN 9-780-198-06002-4.
- Syan, Hardip Singh (2014-09-18). "The merchant gurus: Sikhism and the development of the medieval Khatri merchant family". The Indian Economic & Social History Review. 51 (3): 303–330. doi:10.1177/0019464614536016. S2CID 143907555.
- Judge, Paramjit S.; Kaur, Manjit (2010). "The Politics of Sikh Identity: Understanding Religious Exclusion". Sociological Bulletin. 59 (3): 345–366. doi:10.1177/0038022920100303. ISSN 0038-0229. JSTOR 23620888. S2CID 152062554.
