= Grandiloquence =

a pompous or bombastic style of speech characterized by lofty language, pretentious phrasing, and superficial showiness
