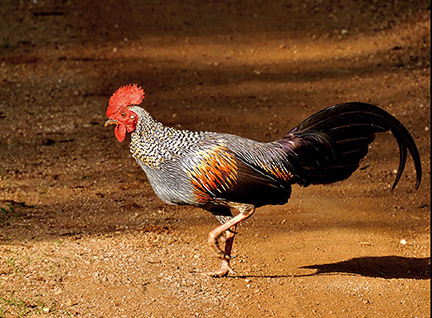
- Grey junglefowl (Gallus sonneratii)

Scientific classification
- Kingdom: Animalia
- Phylum: Chordata
- Class: Aves
- Order: Galliformes
- Family: Phasianidae
- Subfamily: Phasianinae
- Tribe: Gallini; Brehm, 1831

Genera
- Bambusicola; Gallus; Peliperdix; Ortygornis; Francolinus; Campocolinus; Scleroptila

= Gallini (bird) =

Tribe of birds

Gallini is a tribe of bird in the subfamily Phasianinae. It includes the bamboo partridges, francolins and junglefowl (including the chicken). Members of this tribe are found in both Asia and tropical Africa. This grouping was supported by a 2021 phylogenetic analysis of Galliformes, and has been accepted by the International Ornithological Congress. The tribe name is accepted by the Howard and Moore Complete Checklist of the Birds of the World.

== Species ==
Image	Genus	Living species
	Bambusicola Gould, 1863	Mountain bamboo partridge, Bambusicola fytchii; Chinese bamboo partridge, Bambusicola thoracicus; Taiwan bamboo partridge, Bambusicola sonorivox
	Gallus Brisson, 1760	Green junglefowl, Gallus varius; Red junglefowl, Gallus gallus; Domestic chicken, G. g. domesticus; Grey junglefowl, Gallus sonneratii; Sri Lanka junglefowl, Gallus lafayetii
	Peliperdix Bonaparte, 1856	Latham's francolin, Peliperdix lathami
	Ortygornis Reichenbach, 1852	Crested francolin, Ortygornis sephaena; Grey francolin, Ortygornis pondicerianus; Swamp francolin, Ortygornis gularis
	Francolinus Stephens, 1819	Chinese francolin, Francolinus pintadeanus; Black francolin, Francolinus francolinus; Painted francolin, Francolinus pictus
	Campocolinus Crowe et al, 2020	Coqui francolin, Campocolinus coqui; White-throated francolin, Campocolinus albogularis; Schlegel's francolin, Campocolinus schlegelii
	Scleroptila Blyth, 1852	Ring-necked francolin, Scleroptila streptophora; Red-winged francolin, Scleroptila levaillantii; Finsch's francolin, Scleroptila finschi; Moorland francolin, Scleroptila psilolaema; Grey-winged francolin, Scleroptila afra; Orange River francolin, Scleroptila gutturalis; Shelley's francolin, Scleroptila shelleyi; Whyte's francolin, Scleroptila whytei; Elgon francolin, Scleroptila elgonensis
