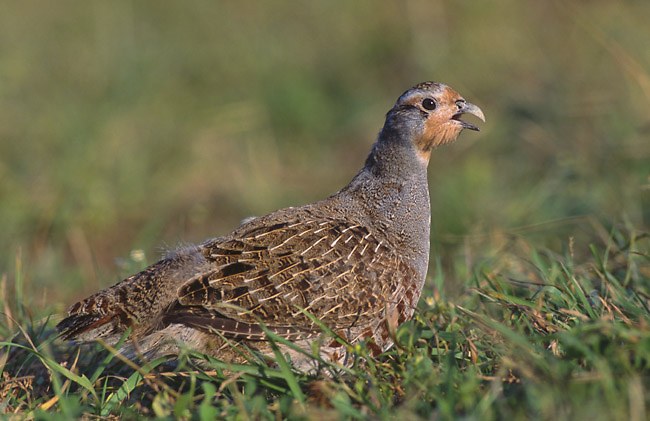
- Grey partridge (Perdix perdix)

Scientific classification
- Kingdom: Animalia
- Phylum: Chordata
- Class: Aves
- Order: Galliformes
- Family: Phasianidae
- Subfamily: Perdicinae; Horsfield, 1821

Genera
- Alectoris; Ammoperdix; Anurophasis; Arborophila; Bambusicola; Caloperdix; Campocolinus; Coturnix; Dendroperdix; Francolinus; Galloperdix; Haematortyx; Lerwa; Margaroperdix; Melanoperdix; Ophrysia; Ortygornis; Peliperdix; Perdicula; Perdix; Pternistis; Rhizothera; Rollulus; Scleroptila; Tetraogallus; Tetraophasis; Tropicoperdix; Xenoperdix

= Perdicinae =

Subfamily of birds

Perdicinae is a polyphyletic former subfamily of birds in the pheasant family, Phasianidae, regrouping the partridges, Old World quails, and francolins. Although this subfamily was considered monophyletic and separated from the pheasants, tragopans, junglefowls, and peafowls (Phasianinae) till the early 1990s, molecular phylogenies have shown that these two subfamilies actually constitute only one lineage. For example, some partridges (Perdix genus) are more closely affiliated to pheasants, whereas Old World quails and partridges from the Alectoris genus are closer to junglefowls. Due to this, the subfamily Perdicinae is no longer recognized by the International Ornithological Congress, with the species being split among 3 subfamilies.

Perdicinae is a non-migratory Old World group. These are medium-sized birds, and are native to Europe, Asia, Africa, and the Middle East. They are ground-nesting seed-eaters. The subfamily includes the partridges, the snowcocks, the francolins, the spurfowl and the Old World quail.

== Species list in taxonomic order ==
- Alectoris
  - Arabian partridge, Alectoris melanocephala
  - Przevalski's partridge, Alectoris magna
  - Rock partridge, Alectoris graeca
  - Chukar partridge, Alectoris chukar
  - Philby's partridge, Alectoris philbyi
  - Barbary partridge, Alectoris barbara
  - Red-legged partridge, Alectoris rufa
- Ammoperdix
  - See-see partridge, Ammoperdix griseogularis
  - Sand partridge, Ammoperdix heyi
- Arborophila, the hill partridges
  - Hill partridge, Arborophila torqueola
  - Sichuan partridge, Arborophila rufipectus
  - Chestnut-breasted partridge, Arborophila mandellii
  - White-necklaced partridge, Arborophila gingica
  - Rufous-throated partridge, Arborophila rufogularis
  - White-cheeked partridge, Arborophila atrogularis
  - Taiwan partridge, Arborophila crudigularis
  - Hainan partridge, Arborophila ardens
  - Chestnut-bellied partridge, Arborophila javanica
  - Grey-breasted partridge, Arborophila orientalis
  - Bar-backed partridge, Arborophila brunneopectus
  - Orange-necked partridge, Arborophila davidi
  - Chestnut-headed partridge, Arborophila cambodiana
  - Red-breasted partridge, Arborophila hyperythra
  - Red-billed partridge, Arborophila rubrirostris
  - Sumatran partridge, Arborophila sumatrana
  - Roll's partridge, Arborophila rolli
  - Malayan partridge, Arborophila campbelli
  - Vietnam partridge, Arborophila merlini
- Bambusicola
  - Mountain bamboo partridge, Bambusicola fytchii
  - Chinese bamboo partridge, Bambusicola thoracica
  - Taiwan bamboo partridge, Bambusicola sonorivox
- Caloperdix
  - Ferruginous partridge, Caloperdix oculea
- Campocolinus
  - Coqui francolin, Campocolinus coqui
  - White-throated francolin, Campocolinus albogularis
  - Schlegel's francolin, Campocolinus schlegelii
- Coturnix
  - Rain quail, Coturnix coromandelica
  - Harlequin quail, Coturnix delegorguei
  - Common quail, Coturnix coturnix
  - Japanese quail, Coturnix japonica
  - †New Zealand quail, Coturnix novaezelandiae (extinct)
  - Stubble quail, Coturnix pectoralis
- Francolinus
  - Black francolin, Francolinus francolinus
  - Painted francolin, Francolinus pictus
  - Chinese francolin, Francolinus pintadeanus
- Galloperdix
  - Red spurfowl, Galloperdix spadicea
  - Painted spurfowl, Galloperdix lunulata
  - Sri Lanka spurfowl, Galloperdix bicalcarata
- Haematortyx
  - Crimson-headed partridge, Haematortyx sanguiniceps
- Lerwa
  - Snow partridge, Lerwa lerwa
- Margaroperdix
  - Madagascar partridge, Margaroperdix madagarensis
- Melanoperdix
  - Black partridge, Melanoperdix nigra
- Ophrysia
  - Himalayan quail, Ophrysia monorthonyx
- Ortygornis
  - Crested francolin, Ortygornis sephaena
  - Grey francolin, Ortygornis pondicerianus
  - Swamp francolin, Ortygornis gularis
- Peliperdix
  - Latham's francolin, Peliperdix lathami
- Perdicula
  - Jungle bush quail, Perdicula asiatica
  - Rock bush quail, Perdicula argoondah
  - Painted bush quail, Perdicula erythrorhyncha
  - Manipur bush quail, Perdicula manipurensis
- Perdix
  - Grey partridge, Perdix perdix
  - Daurian partridge, Perdix dauurica
  - Tibetan partridge, Perdix hodgsoniae
- Rhizothera
  - Long-billed partridge, Rhizothera longirostris
  - Dulit partridge, ''Rhizothera dulitensis
- Pternistis
  - Hartlaub's spurfowl, Pternistis hartlaubi
  - Mount Cameroon spurfowl, Pternistis camerunensis
  - Handsome spurfowl, Pternistis nobilis
  - Swierstra's spurfowl, Pternistis swierstrai
  - Erckel's spurfowl, Pternistis erckelii
  - Djibouti spurfowl, Pternistis ochropectus
  - Chestnut-naped spurfowl, Pternistis castaneicollis
  - Black-fronted spurfowl, Pternistis atrifrons
  - Jackson's spurfowl, Pternistis jacksoni
  - Scaly spurfowl, Pternistis squamatus
  - Ahanta spurfowl, Pternistis ahantensis
  - Grey-striped spurfowl, Pternistis griseostriatus
  - Hildebrandt's spurfowl, Pternistis hildebrandti
  - Natal spurfowl, Pternistis natalensis
  - Red-billed spurfowl, Pternistis adspersus
  - Cape spurfowl, Pternistis capensis
  - Heuglin's spurfowl, Pternistis icterorhynchus
  - Double-spurred spurfowl, Pternistis bicalcaratus
  - Harwood's spurfowl, Pternistis harwoodi
  - Clapperton's spurfowl, Pternistis clappertoni
  - Yellow-necked spurfowl, Pternistis leucoscepus
  - Swainson's spurfowl, Pternistis swainsonii
  - Grey-breasted spurfowl, Pternistis rufopictus
  - Red-necked spurfowl, Pternistis afer
- Rollulus
  - Crested partridge, Rollulus rouloul
- Scleroptila
  - Ring-necked francolin, Scleroptila streptophora
  - Grey-winged francolin, Scleroptila afra
  - Red-winged francolin, Scleroptila levaillantii
  - Finsch's francolin, Scleroptila finschi
  - Shelley's francolin, Scleroptila shelleyi
  - Moorland francolin, Scleroptila psilolaema
  - Orange River francolin, Scleroptila levaillantoides
- Synoicus
  - Brown quail, Synoicus ypsilophorus
  - Snow Mountain quail, Synoicus monorthonyx
  - King quail, Synoicus chinensis
  - Blue quail, Synoicus adansonii
- Tetraogallus
  - Caucasian snowcock, Tetraogallus caucasicus
  - Caspian snowcock, Tetraogallus caspius
  - Himalayan snowcock, Tetraogallus himalayensis
  - Tibetan snowcock, Tetraogallus tibetanus
  - Altai snowcock, Tetraogallus altaicus
- Tetraophasis
  - Verreaux's monal-partridge, Tetraophasis obscurus
  - Szechenyi's monal-partridge, Tetraophasis szechenyii
- Tropicoperdix
  - Green-legged partridge, Tropicoperdix chloropus
  - Chestnut-necklaced partridge, Tropicoperdix charltonii
- Xenoperdix
  - Rubeho forest partridge, Xenoperdix obscuratus
  - Udzungwa forest partridge, Xenoperdix udzungwensis
