= Game (hunting) =

Wild animals under pursuit or taken in hunting

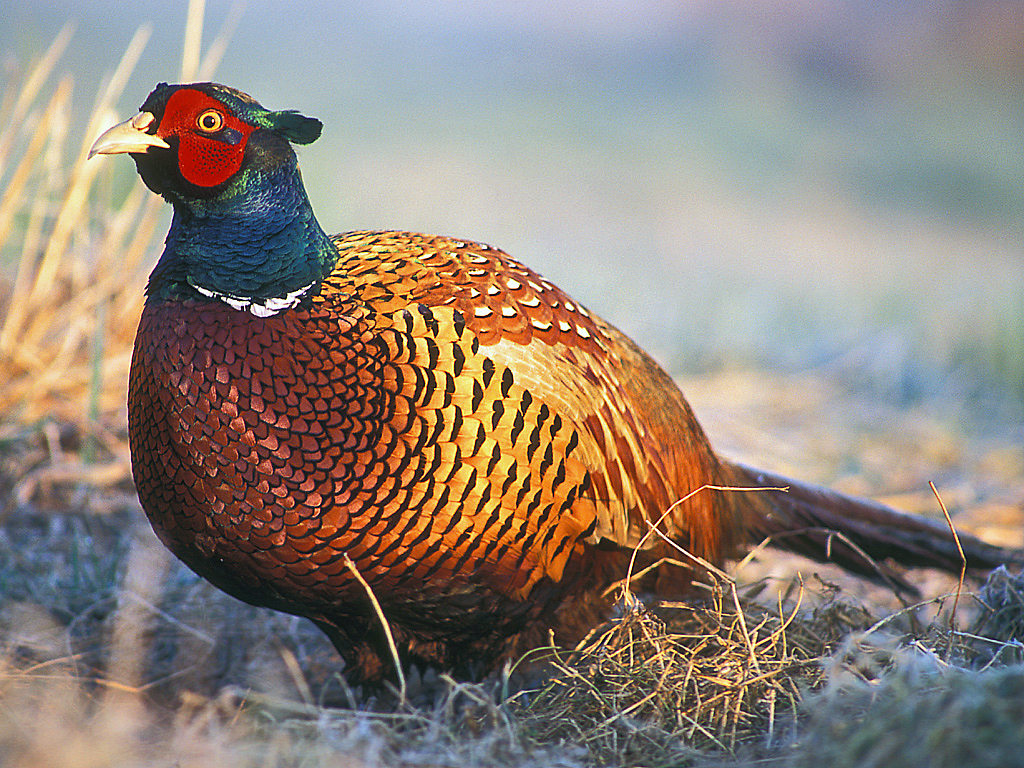
Common pheasant, widely introduced and hunted as game

Game or quarry are wild animals which are hunted for animal products (primarily meat), for recreation ("sporting"), or for trophies. The species of animals hunted as game varies in different parts of the world and by different local jurisdictions, though most are terrestrial mammals and birds. Fish caught non-commercially (recreational fishing) are also referred to as game fish.

== By continent and region ==
Game meat production

The range of animal species hunted by humans varies in different parts of the world. This is influenced by climate, faunal diversity, popular taste and locally accepted views about what can or cannot be legitimately hunted. Sometimes a distinction is also made between varieties and breeds of a particular animal, such as wild turkey and domestic turkey. The flesh of the animal, when butchered for consumption, is often described as having a "gamey" flavour. This difference in taste can be attributed to the natural diet of the animal, which usually results in a lower fat content compared to domestic farm-raised animals.

In some countries, game is classified, including legal classifications with respect to licenses required, as either "small game" or "large game". A single small game licence may cover all small game species and be subject to yearly bag limits. Large game are often subject to individual licensing where a separate permit is required for each individual animal taken (tags).

=== Africa ===
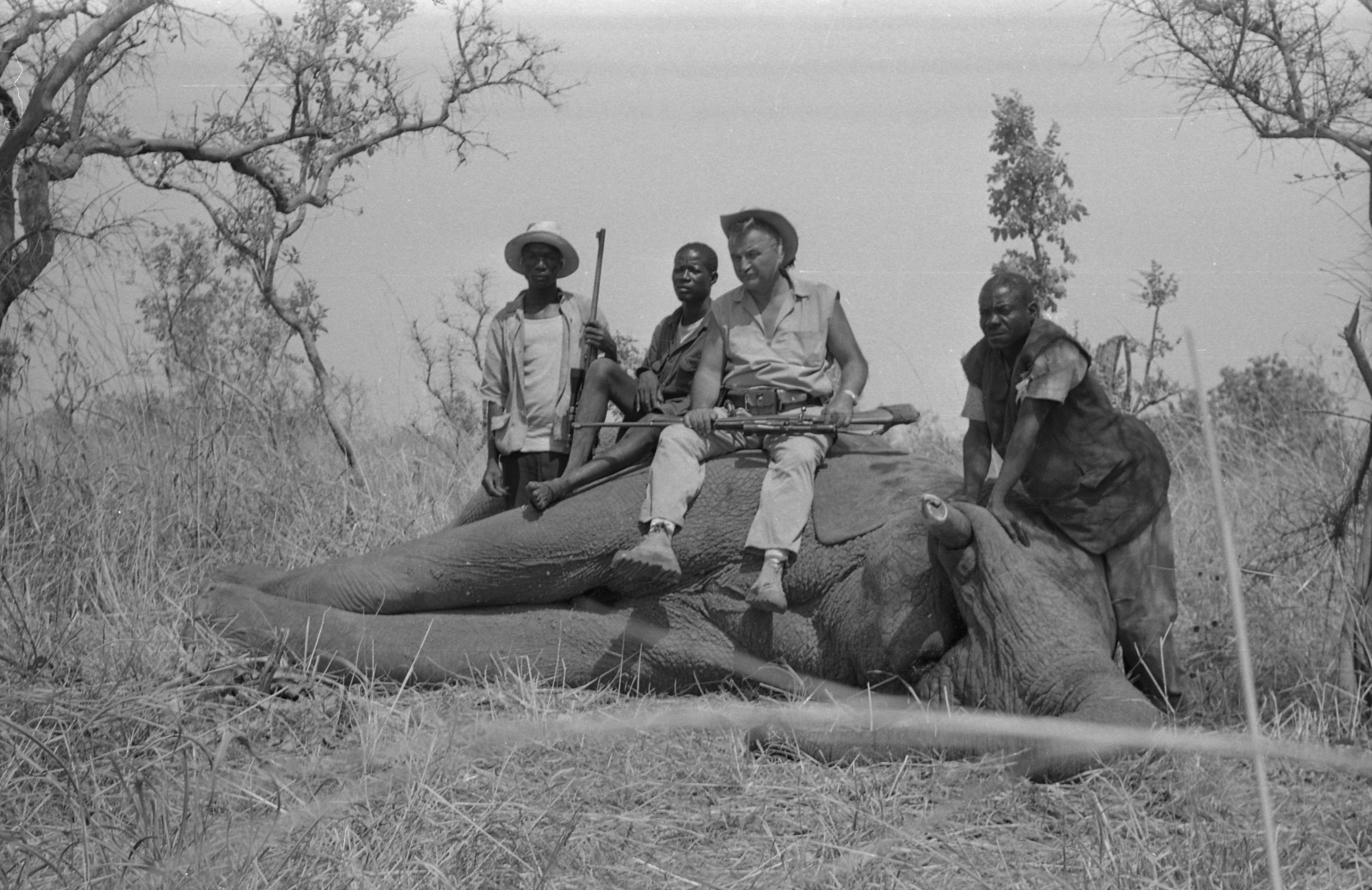
A hunter and local guides with his kill, 1970

In some parts of Africa, wild animals hunted for their meat are called bushmeat. Animals hunted for bushmeat include, but are not limited to:

- Various species of antelope, including duikers
- Various species of primates like mandrills or gorillas
- Rodents like porcupines or cane rats

Some of these animals are endangered or otherwise protected, and thus it is illegal to hunt them.

In Africa, animals hunted for their pelts or ivory are sometimes referred to as big game.

Also see the legal definition of game in Eswatini.

==== South Africa ====
South Africa is a famous destination for game hunting, with its large biodiversity and therefore impressive variety of game species. Many creatures have returned to former areas from which they were once taken as a result of being killed for big-game hunting. Commonly hunted species include:

- Springbok
- Impala
- Steenbok
- Oribi
- Bushbuck
- Nyala
- Greater kudu
- Common eland
- Blue wildebeest
- Black wildebeest
- Blesbok
- Bontebok
- Sable antelope
- Roan antelope
- Gemsbok
- Giraffe
- Cape buffalo
- Southern white rhinoceros
- Plains zebra

South Africa also has 62 species of gamebirds, including guineafowl, francolin, partridge, quail, sandgrouse, duck, geese, snipe, bustard and korhaan. Some of these species are no longer hunted, and of the 44 indigenous gamebirds that can potentially be utilised in South Africa, only three, namely the yellow-throated sandgrouse, Delegorgue's pigeon and the African pygmy goose warrant special protection. Of the remaining 41 species, 24 have shown an increase in numbers and distribution range in the last 25 years or so. The status of 14 species appears unchanged, with insufficient information being available for the remaining three species. The gamebirds of South Africa where the population status in 2005 was secure or growing are listed below:

- Helmeted guineafowl
- Greywing partridge
- Redwing partridge
- Orange River partridge
- Cape francolin
- Natal francolin
- Swainson's francolin
- Common quail
- Harlequin quail
- Namaqua sandgrouse
- Double-banded sandgrouse
- Burchell's sandgrouse
- White-faced duck
- Egyptian goose
- Yellow-billed duck
- Red-billed teal
- Cape shoveler
- Southern pochard
- Knob-billed duck
- Spur-winged goose

=== Oceania ===
==== Australia ====
In Australia, game includes:

- Deer and sambar
- Duck
- Magpie geese
- European rabbit
- Feral cat
- Red fox
- Wild pig
- Feral goat
- Kangaroo
- Emu
- Crocodile (Saltwater and Freshwater)
- Feral buffalo
- Banteng ("Scrub bull")
- Feral camel
- Australian feral horse
- Quail
- Wild bull
- Blackbuck
- Feral donkey
- Feral dog (not to be confused with the Dingo)

==== New Zealand ====
Game in New Zealand includes:

- Chamois
- Deer, multiple species
- Pig
- Tahr
- Duck, multiple species

=== North America ===
==== Canada and the United States ====
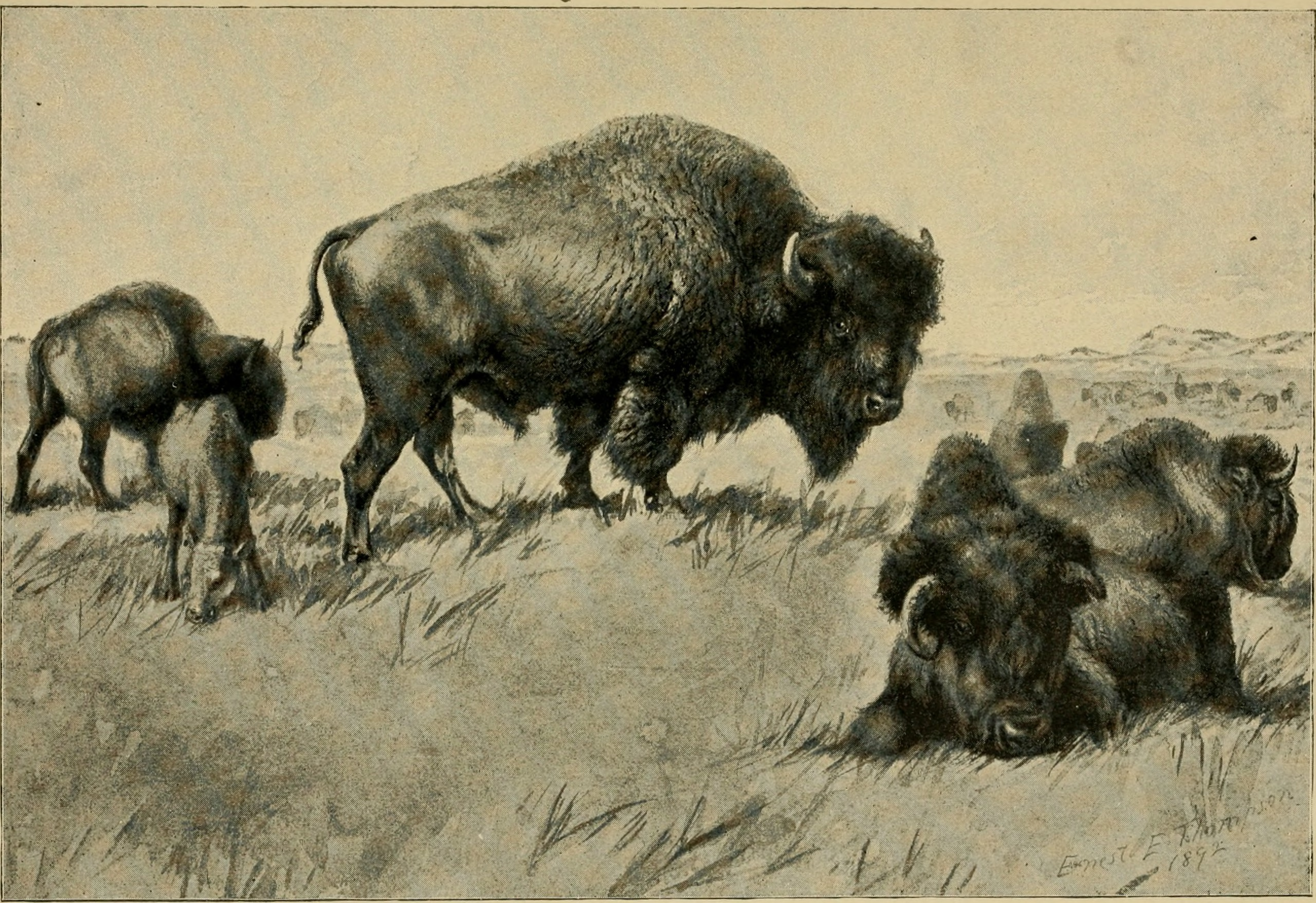
Big-game hunting

Wild game has historically been a major element in United States cooking, and was frequently stocked in markets until the late nineteenth century. Venison in particular made up a large portion of many diets, and was frequently listed alongside other meats rather than as part of a single category of "game". In the present game is however commonly eaten only as an occasional delicacy, and is rare except for small animals such as squirrel and rabbit. Small game birds such as American robin, thrush, snipe, and woodcock were also frequently hunted, and were commonly roasted with the digestive tract, referred to as the "tail", left in the body.

Brunswick stew is a dish from Virginia traditionally made using the meat of small game animals, such as squirrel, rabbit or opossum. In the present, however, chicken and domestic rabbit are sometimes substituted for hunted meat. Burgoo is another game stew from Indiana and Kentucky developed by frontiersmen, who made it from a mixture of whatever meats were available, frequently including squirrel and rabbit. Venison is also sometimes used. Modern recipes, however, also tend to use meat from domestic animals.

In the United States and Canada, white-tailed deer are the most commonly hunted big game. Other game species include:

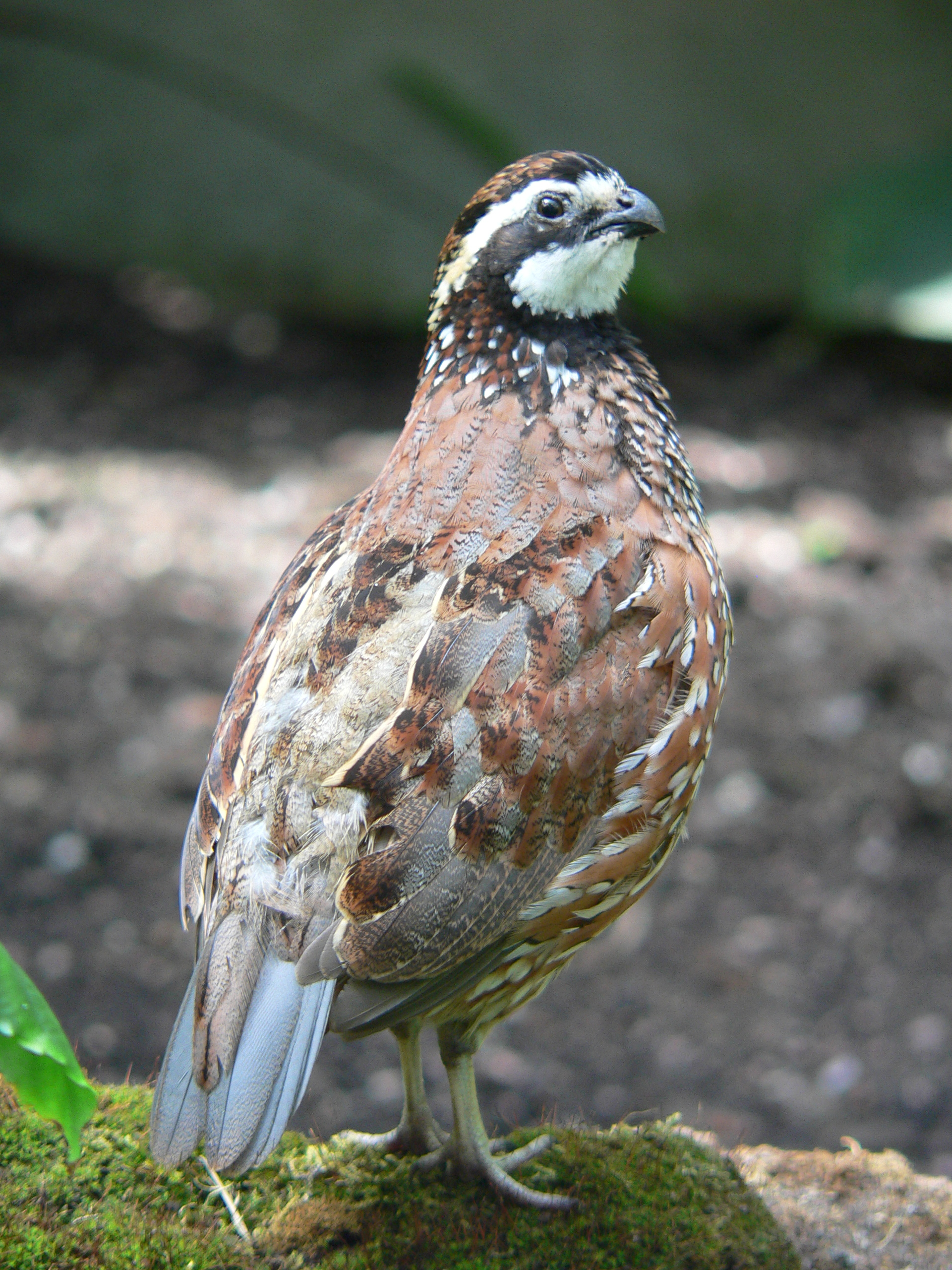
Bobwhite quail, an important North American gamebird

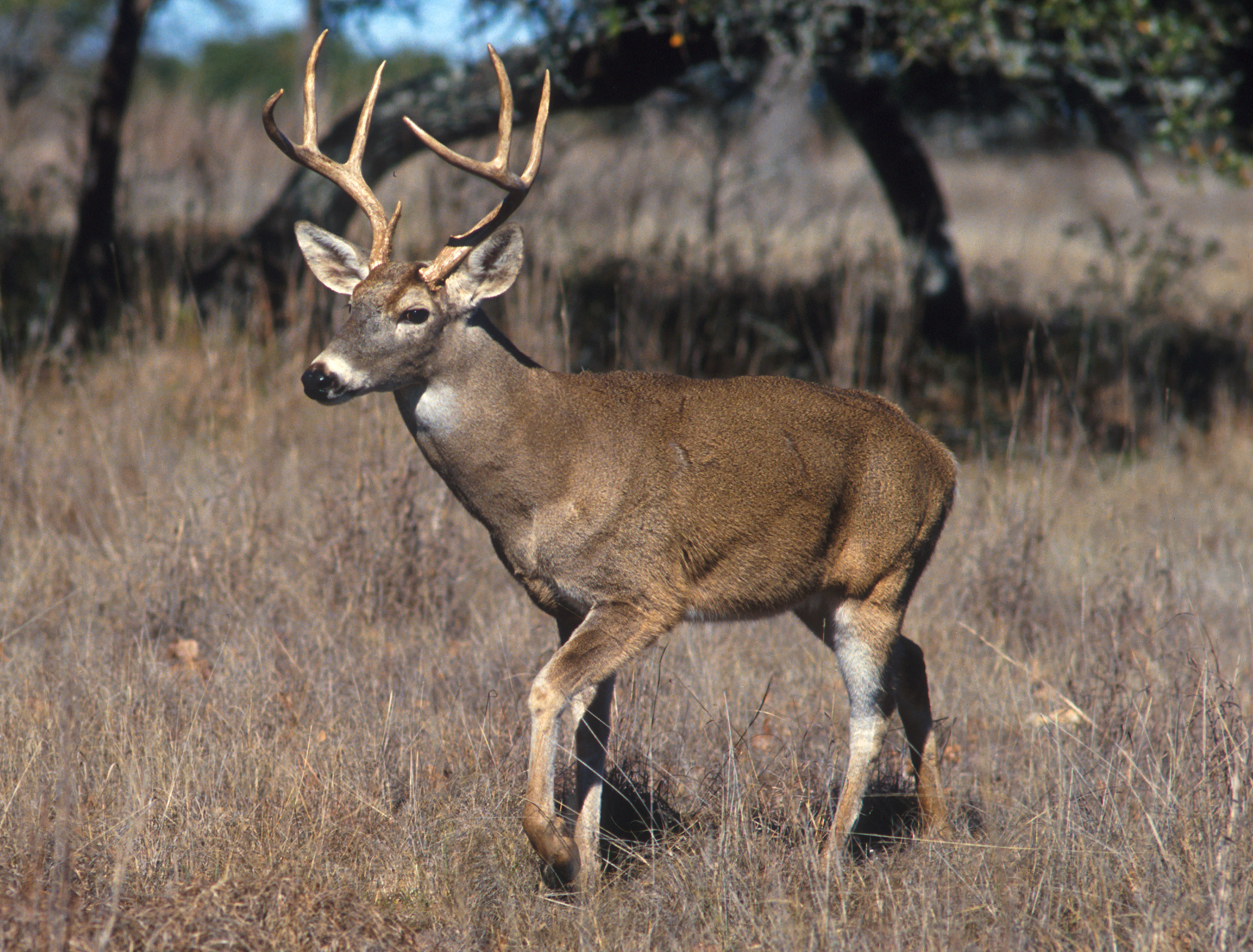
White-tailed deer

===== Reptiles and amphibians =====
- American alligator
- American bullfrog
- Common snapping turtle
- Rattlesnake
- Burmese python

===== Birds (predator) =====
- Crow
- Cowbird
- Raven

===== Birds (upland game birds) =====
- Dove
- Chukar partridge
- Grouse
- Gray partridge
- Ring-necked pheasant
- Ptarmigan
- Quail
- Turkey

===== Birds (waterfowl) =====
- Duck
- Goose

===== Birds (shorebirds) =====
- Wilson's snipe
- Woodcock

===== Ungulates =====
- American bison
- Bighorn sheep
- Dall sheep
- White-tailed deer
- Mule deer
- Elk
- Moose
- Mountain goat
- Muskox
- Pronghorn
- Caribou
- Feral hogs

===== Carnivores =====
- American black bear
- Bobcat
- Coyote
- Fox
- Grizzly bear
- Cougar
- Raccoon

===== Rodents =====
- Beaver
- Muskrat
- Nutria
- Squirrel

===== Misc. mammals =====
- Hare
- Rabbit
- Opossum

==== Caribbean ====
The Caribbean has various species, most of these species are considered delicacies.

===== Reptiles and amphibians =====
- Green iguana
- Spectacled caiman
- American bullfrog

===== Waterfowl =====
- Blue winged teal
- White cheeked pintail
- West indian whistling duck
- Masked duck
- Wood duck
- American coot
- Common gallinule
- Purple gallinule

===== Upland gamebirds =====
- Ring necked pheasant
- Northern bobwhite
- Helmeted guineafowl
- Rufous vented chachalaca
- Eurasian collared dove
- White winged dove
- Zenaida dove
- Mourning dove
- White crowned pigeon
- Scaly naped pigeon
- Plain pigeon
- Ruddy quail dove
- Crested quail dove

===== Wading birds =====
- Limpkin
- Whimbrel
- Lesser yellowlegs
- Greater yellowlegs
- Pectoral sandpiper
- White ibis

===== Mammals =====
- Common opossum
- Central American aguoti
- Red rumped aguoti
- Desmarest's Hutia
- Raccoon
- Feral dog
- White tailed deer
- Feral cattle
- Feral buffalo
- Feral goat
- Feral hog

=== Asia ===
==== People's Republic of China ====
In the PRC there is a special cuisine category called yewei, which includes animals in the wild.

==== Russia ====
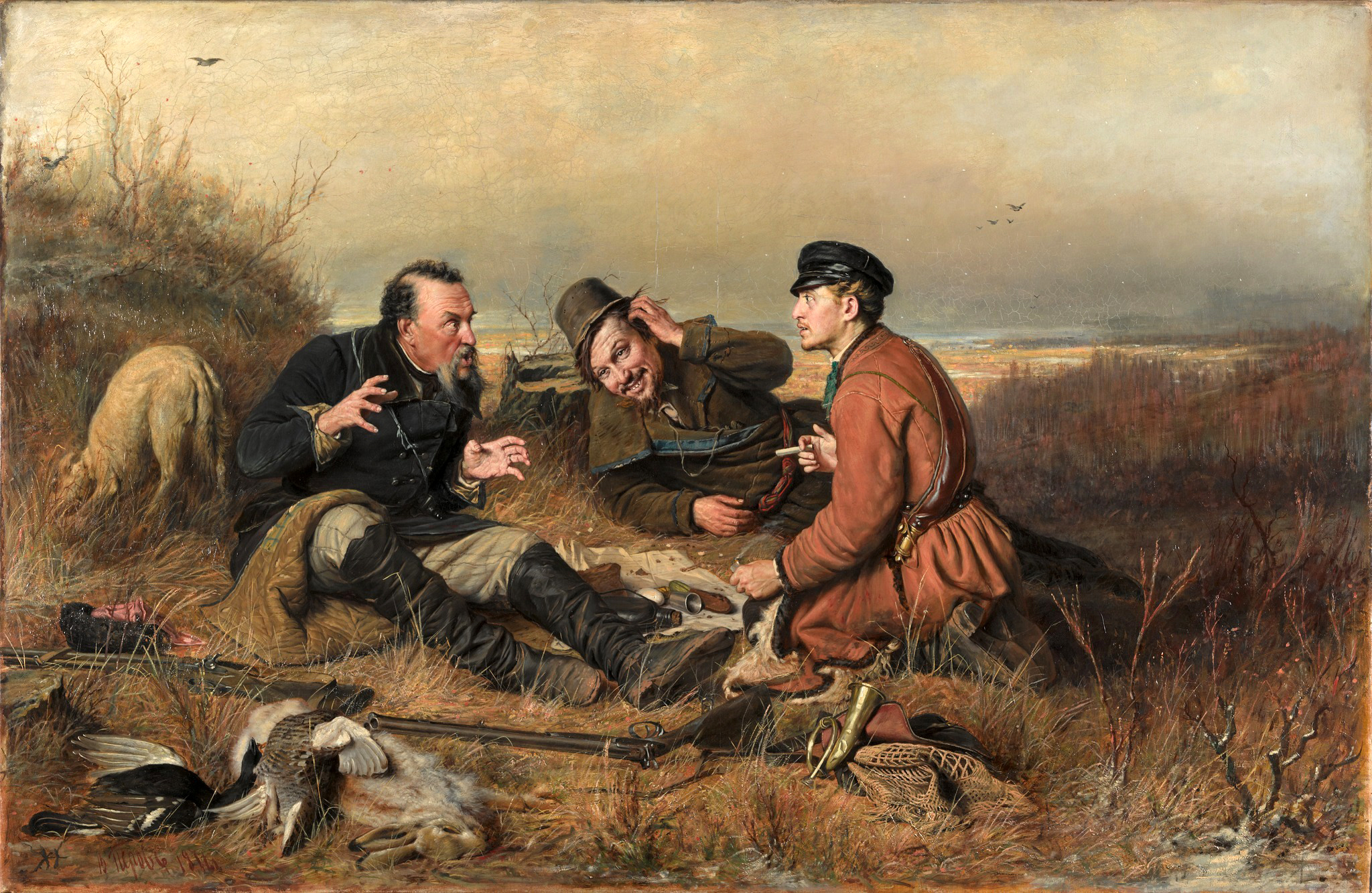
"The Hunters at Rest" by Vasily Perov, 1871

- Anser
- Beaver
- Black grouse
- Brown bear
- Common quail
- Deer
- Duck
- European hare
- Fox
- Ground squirrel
- Goose
- Hazel grouse
- Eurasian lynx
- Mountain hare
- Perdix
- Pheasant
- Rabbit
- Raven
- Siberian ibex
- Squirrel
- Wild boar
- Woodcock

=== Europe ===
==== United Kingdom ====
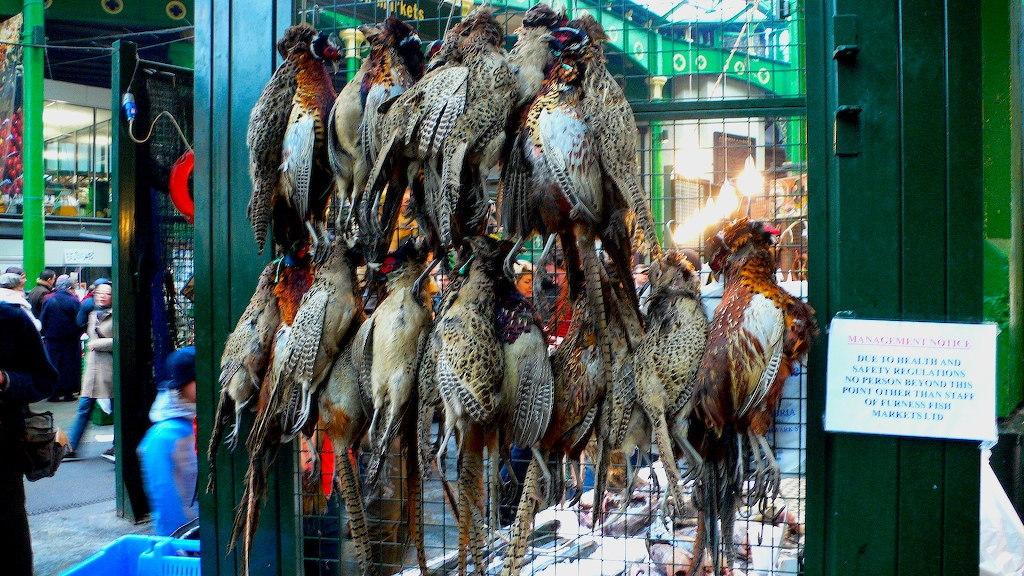
Game birds at Borough Market in London

In the UK, game is defined in law by the Game Act 1831 (1 & 2 Will. 4. c. 32). It is illegal to shoot game on Sundays or at night. Other non-game birds that are hunted for food in the UK are specified under the Wildlife and Countryside Act 1981. UK law defines game as including:

- Black grouse (No longer hunted due to decline in numbers)
- Red grouse
- Brown hare
- Rock ptarmigan
- Grey and red-legged partridges
- Common pheasant

Deer are not included in the definition, but similar controls provided to those in the Game Act apply to deer (from the Deer Act 1991). Deer hunted in the UK are:

- Red deer
- Roe deer
- Fallow deer
- Sika deer
- Muntjac deer
- Chinese water deer
- and hybrids of these deer

Other animals which are hunted in the UK include:

- Duck, including mallard, tufted duck, teal, northern pintail and common pochard
- Goose, including greylag goose, Canada goose and pink-footed goose
- Wood pigeon
- Cuckoo
- Eurasian woodcock
- Common snipe
- Eurasian golden plover
- Corncrake

Capercaillie are not currently hunted in the UK because of a recent decline in numbers and conservation projects towards their recovery. The ban is generally considered voluntary on private lands, and few birds live away from RSPB or Forestry Commission land allegedly.

==== Iceland ====
In Iceland game includes:

- Reindeer
- Rock ptarmigan, a popular Christmas dish in Iceland
- Puffin
- Auk
- Goose
- Mallard

==== Nordic countries ====
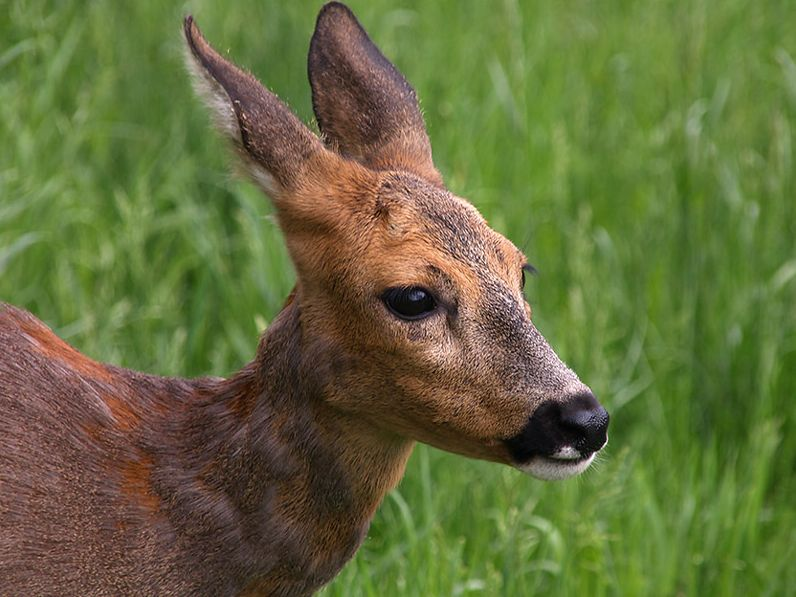
Roe deer

Game in Norway, Sweden, Denmark and Finland includes:

- Moose, Alces alces. Moose hunting season in October is close to a national pastime.
- Fallow deer
- Red deer
- Roe deer
- Mountain hare
- Boar in Denmark and southern Sweden. (Once hunted to extinction, boars were re-introduced in the late 20th century and are now considered a pest by farmers, but an asset by hunters.)
- Rock ptarmigan
- Willow ptarmigan
- Mallard
- Auk in Norway
- Black grouse
- Woodcock
- Common pheasant
- Common wood pigeon
- Goose

==== Poland ====
In Poland, legal game includes:
Big game

- Moose
- Red deer
- Sika deer
- Fallow deer
- Roe deer
- Wild boar
- European mouflon

Small game

- Fox
- Common raccoon dog
- Badger
- European pine marten
- Beech marten
- American mink
- Polecat
- (American) raccoon
- Muskrat
- European hare
- European rabbit
- Hazel grouse
- Common pheasant
- Grey partridge
- Greylag goose
- Bean goose
- Greater white-fronted goose
- Mallard
- Eurasian teal
- Common pochard
- Tufted duck
- Common wood pigeon
- Eurasian woodcock
- Eurasian coot

==== Germany ====
In Germany legal game includes:

- Roe deer (Capreolus capreolus L.) - most common.
- European fallow deer (Dama dama L.)
- Wild boar (Sus scrofa L.)
- Red deer (Cervus elaphus L.)
- Sika deer
- European mufflon
- Chamois (only lives in Bavaria)
- European hare and European rabbit
- Red fox
- Racoon dog
- European badger
- Stoat, European polecat, least weasel, pine marten and beech marten
- Racoon
- Greater rhea (only lives in Mecklenburg-Vorpommern)
- Mute swan
- Canada goose, Egyptian goose, greylag goose, bean goose, greater white-fronted goose, brent goose and ruddy shelduck
- Mallard, northern pintail, Eurasian teal, European wigeon, tufted duck, common pochard, greater scaup, velvet scoter and common scoter
- Ring-necked pheasant
- Grey partridge
- Wild turkey (only lives in North Rhine-Westphalia)
- Wood pigeon and Eurasian collared dove

The German hunting laws list animals like moose, European bison, brown bear, harbour seal, western capercaillie, greater bustard and birds of prey as game even though there are no hunting seasons for them as they're endangered in Germany. Hunting in Germany is very restricted, and it is really hard to practice without living in Germany for a long time.

== Meat preparation ==
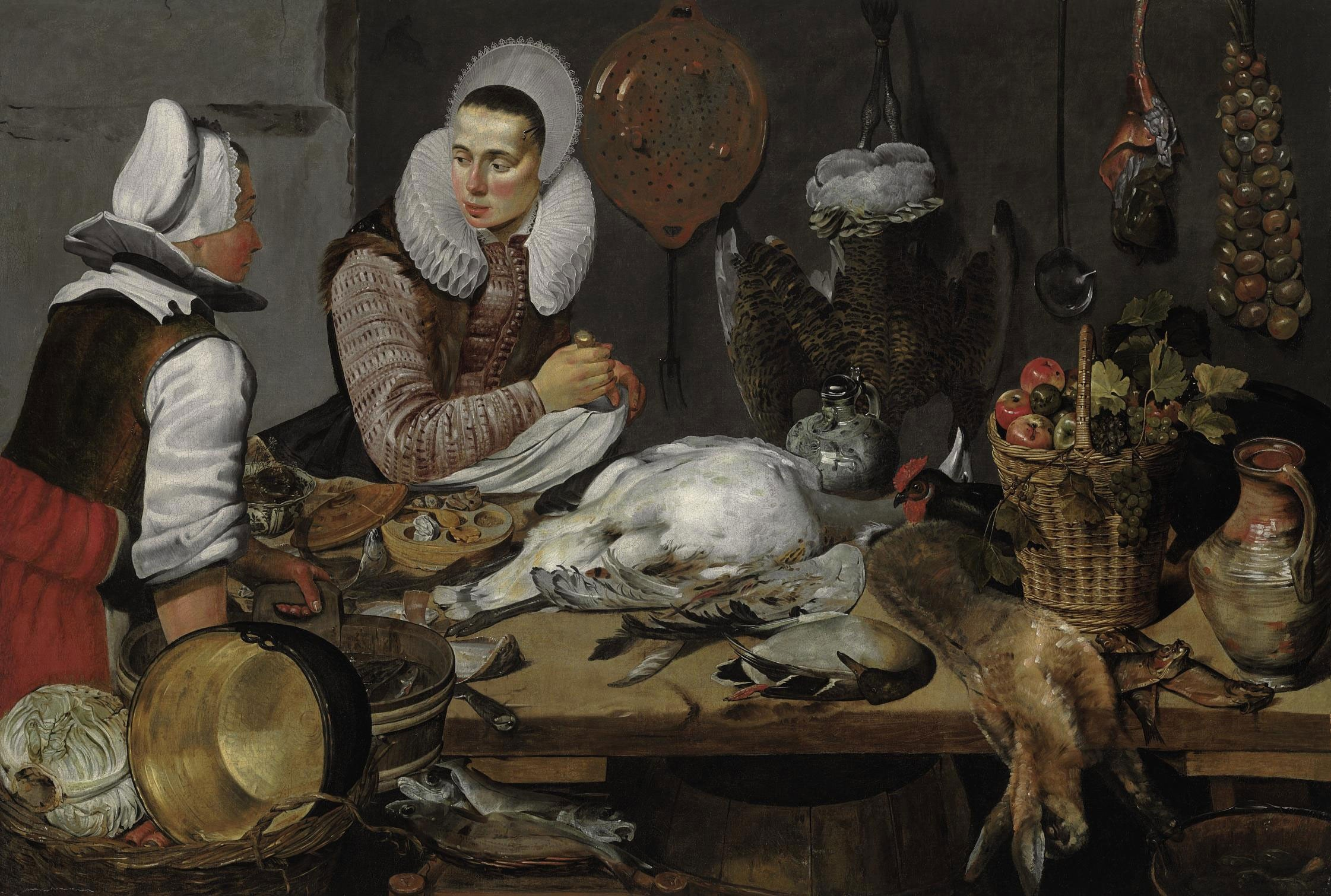
A kitchen interior with a maid and a lady preparing game, c. 1600

Game meat is obtained through the process of hunting animals in their natural habitat, typically with a gun or bow. Modern hunting practices aim to make the death of the animal as quick and painless as possible. Once obtained, game meat must be processed to avoid spoiling. The method of processing varies by game species and size. Small game and fowl may simply be carried home to be butchered. Large game such as deer is quickly field-dressed by removing the viscera in the field, while very large animals like moose may be partially butchered in the field because of the difficulty of removing them intact from their habitat. Commercial processors often handle deer taken during deer seasons, sometimes even at supermarket meat counters. Otherwise the hunter handles butchering. The carcass is kept cool to minimize spoilage.

Traditionally, game meat was hung until "high" or "gamey", that is, approaching a state of decomposition. However, this adds to the risk of contamination. Small game can be processed essentially intact, after gutting and skinning or defeathering (by species). Small animals are ready for cooking, although they may be disjointed first. Large game must be processed by techniques commonly practiced by commercial butchers.

== Cooking ==
Generally game is cooked in the same ways as farmed meat. Because some game meat is leaner than store-bought beef, overcooking is a common mishap which can be avoided if properly prepared. It is sometimes grilled or cooked longer or by slow cooking or moist-heat methods to make it more tender, since some game tends to be tougher than farm-raised meat. Other methods of tenderizing include marinating as in the dish Hasenpfeffer, cooking in a game pie or as a stew such as burgoo.

== Safety ==
The Norwegian Food Safety Authority considers that children, pregnant women, fertile-aged women, and people with high blood pressure should not consume game shot with lead-based ammunition more than once a month. Children who often eat such game might develop a slightly lower IQ, as lead influences the development of the central nervous system. This can be avoided by hunting with arrows or copper bullets.

== See also ==
- Animal trapping
- Big game hunting
- Big five game
- British Association for Shooting and Conservation
- Bushfood
- Bushmeat
- Endangered species
- Fishing
- Game fish
- Game & Wildlife Conservation Trust
- Game drive system
- Game preservation
- Hunter-gatherer
- Hunting horn
- Hunting and shooting in the United Kingdom
- Hunting
- Legislation on hunting with dogs
- Ornithology
- Overfishing
- Persistence hunting
- Taxidermy, the preserving of an animal's body for the purpose of display or study
- Varmint hunting
- Waterfowl hunting
- Wildlife
- Yewei
