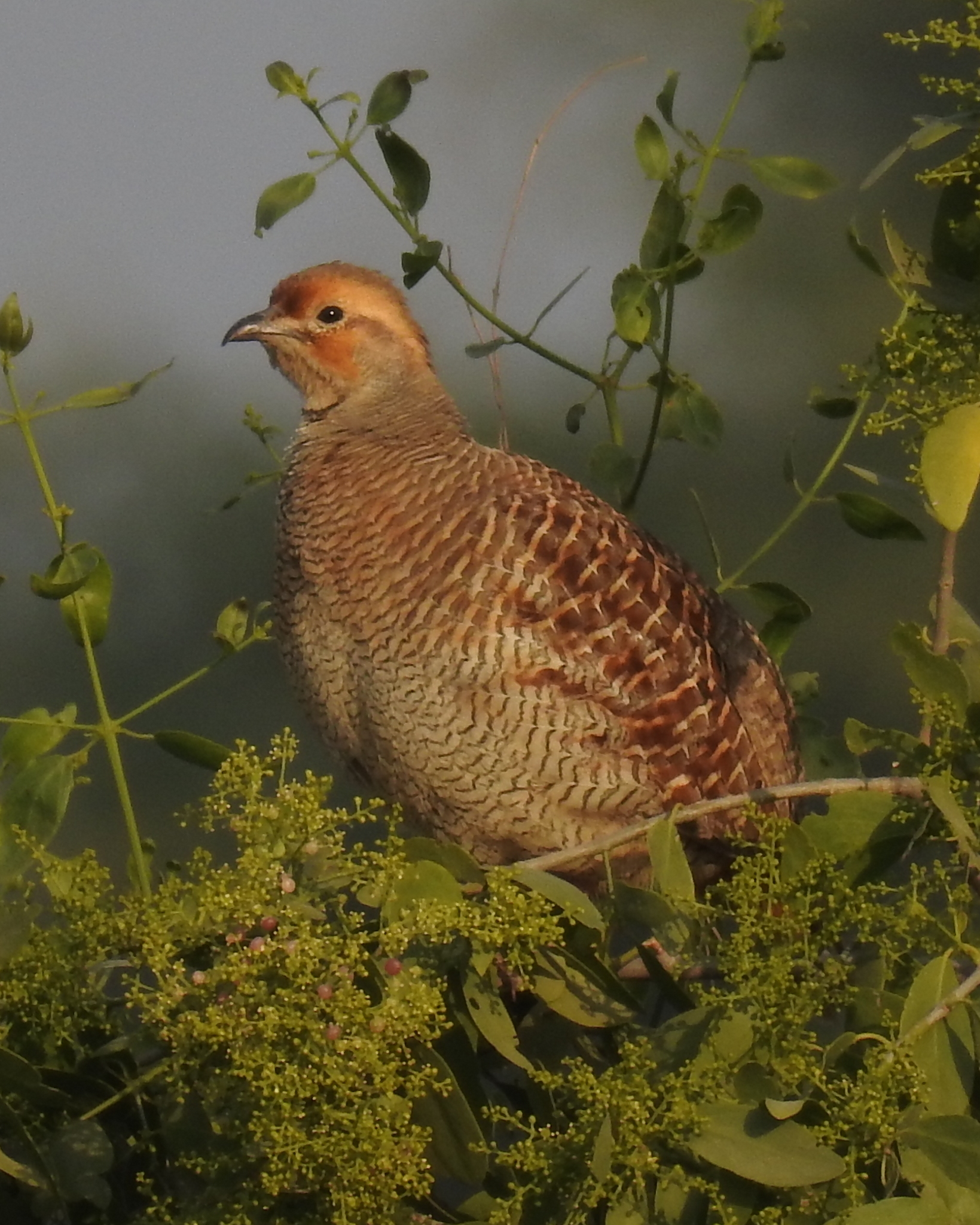
- Grey francolin

Scientific classification
- Kingdom: Animalia
- Phylum: Chordata
- Class: Aves
- Order: Galliformes
- Family: Phasianidae
- Subfamily: Phasianinae
- Tribe: Gallini

Genera
- Peliperdix; Ortygornis; Francolinus; Campocolinus; Scleroptila

= Francolin =

Group of birds

Francolins are birds in the tribe Gallini that traditionally have been placed in the genus Francolinus, but now commonly are divided into multiple genera.

As previously defined, they were paraphyletic as the genus Pternistis, which was previously included in Francolinus, is more closely related to Old World quails than it is to the other francolins. Beginning in 2004, various ornithologists have recommended that it would be clearer to use "spurfowl" for all members of the genus Pternistis and restrict the use of "francolin" to the other species presently or formerly classified in Francolinus. When Pternistis is excluded, the francolins form a monophyletic clade that is a sister group to a clade comprising the junglefowl (Gallus) and the bamboo partridges (Bambusicola); together, these clades compose the tribe Gallini.

Although formerly classified in the partridge subfamily Perdicinae, this classification is no longer supported, and they are now classified in the subfamily Pavoninae.

Francolins are terrestrial (though not flightless) birds that feed on insects, vegetable matter and seeds. Most of the members have a hooked upper beak, well-suited for digging at the bases of grass tussocks and rootballs. They have wide tails with fourteen rectrix feathers. Most species exhibit spurs on the tarsi.

== Distribution ==
Of the approximately 17 extant species, the natural range of five (composing the genus Francolinus and Ortygornis) are restricted to Asia, while the remaining genera are restricted to Africa. Several species have been introduced to other parts of the world, notably Hawaii.

Twelve of the species which occur in Africa are found in the subcontinental region of southern Africa; of these, seven occur in varying proportions within the political boundaries of Namibia and Zambia. Six southern African francolins are considered endemic to the subcontinent, of which three are found in Namibia and Zambia (the Hartlaub's, red-billed and Orange River francolins).

The Cape spurfowl, endemic to the Cape Province of South Africa, occurs marginally in southern Namibia and southwestern Zambia. A fossil francolin, Francolinus capeki, has been described from Late Pliocene deposits of Hungary; the contemporary fossil galliforms "Francolinus" minor and "F." subfrancolinus are now placed in Palaeocryptonyx.

== Taxonomy ==
Until the early 1990s, major authorities placed all francolins in the genus Francolinus. In 1992 it was suggested that this treatment was problematic, and the francolins should be split into four genera: Francolinus for the Asian species, and the African species divided into Peliperdix, Scleroptila and Pternistis. The crested francolin and Nahan's francolin were considered possibly quite distinct, but still maintained in Peliperdix and Pternistis respectively. Based on further evidence, the crested francolin was moved to the monotypic genus Dendroperdix in 1998, and the Nahan's francolin was moved to Ptilopachus in 2006. Though some still maintain all these in Francolinus, the split into multiple genera is becoming more widespread. In 2021, two species in Francolinus (the grey and swamp francolins) along with the crested francolin were moved into the genus Ortygornis, while three species from Peliperdix (the coqui, white-throated, and Schlegel's francolins) were moved into the new genus Campocolinus. Pternistis was moved to the tribe Coturnicini and, as with Nahan's "francolin", is no longer considered a francolin.

When split, the English name "francolin" is generally restricted to the members of the genera Francolinus, Ortygornis, Campocolinus, Peliperdix and Scleroptila, while the name "spurfowl" is used for Pternistis ("spurfowl" is also used for Galloperdix of the Indian subcontinent). As the Nahan's "francolin" is related to the stone partridge rather than the true francolins and spurfowl, its name is sometimes modified to Nahan's partridge.

In addition to the major changes proposed at genus level, the species level taxonomy among several francolins/spurfowl is disputed. For example, the distribution of the Orange River francolin (Scleroptila levaillantoides) is highly disjunct, leading some authorities to split the northern taxa (from Kenya and northwards) into a separate species, the acacia/Archer's francolin (S. gutturalis, with subspecies lorti), while maintaining the southern taxa (from Angola and southwards) in the Orange River francolin. Most authorities treat the Elgon francolin (S. psilolaema elgonensis) as a subspecies of the moorland francolin, but others have suggested it is a species (S. elgonensis), a subspecies of the Shelley's francolin, or even a hybrid between the moorland and red-winged francolins.

=== Species ===
- Peliperdix:
  - Latham's francolin, Peliperdix lathami
- Ortygornis:
  - Crested francolin, Ortygornis sephaena
  - Grey francolin, Ortygornis pondicerianus
  - Swamp francolin, Ortygornis gularis
- Francolinus:
  - Black francolin, Francolinus francolinus
  - Painted francolin, Francolinus pictus
  - Chinese francolin, Francolinus pintadeanus
- Campocolinus:
  - Coqui francolin, Campocolinus coqui
  - White-throated francolin, Campocolinus albogularis
  - Schlegel's francolin, Campocolinus schlegelii
- Scleroptila:
  - Ring-necked francolin, Scleroptila streptophora
  - Red-winged francolin, Scleroptila levaillantii
  - Finsch's francolin, Scleroptila finschi
  - Moorland francolin, Scleroptila psilolaema
  - Grey-winged francolin, Scleroptila afra
  - Orange River francolin, Scleroptila gutturalis
  - Shelley's francolin, Scleroptila shelleyi

With a paraphyletic classification, the genus Pternistis in the tribe Coturnicini is also considered a francolin; due to the resulting paraphyly, this classification is no longer supported and has been recommended against.
