= List of birds of Lesotho =

This is a list of the bird species recorded in Lesotho. The avifauna of Lesotho included a total of 361 species, as of October 2022, according to Avibase. Four species have been introduced by humans, and the statuses of six are under review.

This list's taxonomic treatment (designation and sequence of orders, families and species) and nomenclature (English and scientific names) are those of The Clements Checklist of Birds of the World, 2022 edition.

The following tags have been used to highlight several categories of occurrence

- (A) Accidental - a species that rarely or accidentally occurs in Lesotho
- (I) Introduced - a species introduced to Lesotho as a consequence, direct or indirect, of human actions
- (Ex) Extirpated - a species that no longer occurs in Lesotho although populations exist elsewhere
- (S) Status - a species whose status is under review

== Ducks, geese, and waterfowl ==
Order: Anseriformes Family: Anatidae

Anatidae includes the ducks and most duck-like waterfowl, such as geese and swans. These birds are adapted to an aquatic existence with webbed feet, flattened bills, and feathers that are excellent at shedding water due to an oily coating.

- White-faced whistling-duck, Dendrocygna viduata
- Fulvous whistling-duck, Dendrocygna bicolor (A)
- White-backed duck, Thalassornis leuconotus
- Knob-billed duck, Sarkidiornis melanotos
- Egyptian goose, Alopochen aegyptiacus
- South African shelduck, Tadorna cana
- Spur-winged goose, Plectropterus gambensis
- African pygmy-goose, Nettapus auritus
- Blue-billed teal, Spatula hottentota (A)
- Cape shoveler, Spatula smithii
- African black duck, Anas sparsa
- Yellow-billed duck, Anas undulata
- Cape teal, Anas capensis (A)
- Red-billed duck, Anas erythrorhyncha
- Southern pochard, Netta erythrophthalma (A)
- Maccoa duck, Oxyura maccoa

== Guineafowl ==
Order: Galliformes Family: Numididae

Guineafowl are a group of African, seed-eating, ground-nesting birds that resemble partridges, but with featherless heads and spangled grey plumage.

- Helmeted guineafowl, Numida meleagris

== Pheasants, grouse, and allies ==
Order: Galliformes Family: Phasianidae

The Phasianidae are a family of terrestrial birds which consists of quails, partridges, snowcocks, francolins, spurfowl, tragopans, monals, pheasants, peafowl, and jungle fowl. In general, they are plump (although they vary in size) and have broad, relatively short wings.

- Red-winged francolin, Scleroptila levaillantii
- Gray-winged francolin, Scleroptila afra
- Orange River francolin, Scleroptila gutturalis
- Common quail, Coturnix coturnix
- Harlequin quail, Coturnix delegorguei (A)
- Swainson's francolin, Pternistis swainsonii

== Flamingos ==
Order: Phoenicopteriformes Family: Phoenicopteridae

Flamingos are gregarious wading birds, usually 3 to 5 feet (0.9 to 1.5 m) tall, found in both the Western and Eastern Hemispheres. Flamingos filter-feed on shellfish and algae. Their oddly shaped beaks are specially adapted to separate mud and silt from the food they consume and, uniquely, are used upside-down.

- Greater flamingo, Phoenicopterus roseus
- Lesser flamingo, Phoeniconaias minor

== Grebes ==
Order: Podicipediformes Family: Podicipedidae

Grebes are small to medium-large freshwater diving birds. They have lobed toes and are excellent swimmers and divers. However, they have their feet placed far back on the body, making them quite ungainly on land.

- Little grebe, Tachybaptus ruficollis
- Great crested grebe, Podiceps cristatus (A)
- Eared grebe, Podiceps nigricollis

== Pigeons and doves ==
Order: Columbiformes Family: Columbidae

Pigeons and doves are stout-bodied birds with short necks and short slender bills with a fleshy cere.

- Rock pigeon, Columba livia (I)
- Speckled pigeon, Columba guinea
- Rameron pigeon, Columba arquatrix
- Red-eyed dove, Streptopelia semitorquata
- Ring-necked dove, Streptopelia capicola
- Laughing dove, Streptopelia senegalensis
- Namaqua dove, Oena capensis

== Sandgrouse ==
Order: Pterocliformes Family: Pteroclidae

Sandgrouse have small, pigeon-like heads and necks, but sturdy compact bodies. They have long pointed wings and sometimes tails and a fast direct flight. Flocks fly to watering holes at dawn and dusk. Their legs are feathered down to the toes.

- Namaqua sandgrouse, Pterocles namaqua (A)

== Bustards ==
Order: Otidiformes Family: Otididae

Bustards are large terrestrial birds mainly associated with dry open country and steppes in the Old World. They are omnivorous and nest on the ground. They walk steadily on strong legs and big toes, pecking for food as they go. They have long broad wings with "fingered" wingtips and striking patterns in flight. Many have interesting mating displays.

- Kori bustard, Ardeotis kori
- Ludwig's bustard, Neotis ludwigii
- Denham's bustard, Neotis denhami (A)
- White-bellied bustard, Eupodotis senegalensis
- Blue bustard, Eupodotis caerulescens
- Karoo bustard, Eupodotis vigorsii
- White-quilled bustard, Eupodoti afraoides

== Cuckoos ==
Order: Cuculiformes Family: Cuculidae

The family Cuculidae includes cuckoos, roadrunners, and anis. These birds are of variable size with slender bodies, long tails, and strong legs. The Old World cuckoos are brood parasites.

- White-browed coucal, Centropus superciliosus (A)
- Great spotted cuckoo, Clamator glandarius
- Pied cuckoo, Clamator jacobinus
- Dideric cuckoo, Chrysococcyx caprius
- Black cuckoo, Cuculus clamosus (A)
- Red-chested cuckoo, Cuculus solitarius
- Common cuckoo, Cuculus canorus (A)

== Nightjars and allies ==
Order: Caprimulgiformes Family: Caprimulgidae

Nightjars are medium-sized nocturnal birds that usually nest on the ground. They have long wings, short legs, and very short bills. Most have small feet, of little use for walking, and long pointed wings. Their soft plumage is camouflaged to resemble bark or leaves.

- Eurasian nightjar, Caprimulgus europaeus (A)
- Freckled nightjar, Caprimulgus tristigma
- Square-tailed nightjar, Caprimulgus fossii (A)

== Swifts ==
Order: Caprimulgiformes Family: Apodidae

Swifts are small birds which spend the majority of their lives flying. These birds have very short legs and never settle voluntarily on the ground, perching instead only on vertical surfaces. Many swifts have long swept-back wings which resemble a crescent or boomerang.

- Alpine swift, Apus melba
- Common swift, Apus apus
- African swift, Apus barbatus (S)
- Little swift, Apus affinis
- Horus swift, Apus horus
- White-rumped swift, Apus caffer

== Flufftails ==
Order: Gruiformes Family: Sarothruridae

The flufftails are a small family of ground-dwelling birds found only in Madagascar and sub-Saharan Africa.

- Striped flufftail, Sarothrura affinis

== Rails, gallinules, and coots ==
Order: Gruiformes Family: Rallidae

Rallidae is a large family of small to medium-sized birds which includes the rails, crakes, coots, and gallinules. Typically they inhabit dense vegetation in damp environments near lakes, swamps, or rivers. In general they are shy and secretive birds, making them difficult to observe. Most species have strong legs and long toes which are well adapted to soft uneven surfaces. They tend to have short, rounded wings and to be weak fliers.

- African rail, Rallus caerulescens
- Corn crake, Crex crex (A)
- African crake, Crex egregia
- Spotted crake, Porzana porzana
- Lesser moorhen, Paragallinula angulata
- Eurasian moorhen, Gallinula chloropus
- Red-knobbed coot, Fulica cristata
- Allen's gallinule, Porphyrio alleni
- African swamphen, Porphyrio madagascariensis
- Baillon's crake, Porzana pusilla

== Cranes ==
Order: Gruiformes Family: Gruidae

Cranes are large, long-legged, and long-necked birds. Unlike the similar-looking but unrelated herons, cranes fly with necks outstretched, not pulled back. Most have elaborate and noisy courting displays or "dances".

- Gray crowned-crane, Balearica regulorum (A)
- Blue crane, Anthropoides paradisea (A)
- Wattled crane, Bugeranus carunculatus (A)

== Thick-knees ==
Order: Charadriiformes Family: Burhinidae

The thick-knees are a group of waders found worldwide within the tropical zone, with some species also breeding in temperate Europe and Australia. They are medium to large waders with strong black or yellow-black bills, large yellow eyes, and cryptic plumage. Despite being classed as waders, most species have a preference for arid or semi-arid habitats.

- Spotted thick-knee, Burhinus capensis

== Stilts and avocets ==
Order: Charadriiformes Family: Recurvirostridae

Recurvirostridae is a family of large wading birds which includes the avocets and stilts. The avocets have long legs and long up-curved bills. The stilts have extremely long legs and long, thin, straight bills.

- Black-winged stilt, Himantopus himantopus
- Pied avocet, Recurvirostra avosetta (A)

== Plovers and lapwings ==
Order: Charadriiformes Family: Charadriidae

The family Charadriidae includes the plovers, dotterels, and lapwings. They are small to medium-sized birds with compact bodies, short thick necks, and long, usually pointed, wings. They are found in open country worldwide, mostly in habitats near water.

- Black-bellied plover, Pluvialis squatarola
- Blacksmith lapwing, Vanellus armatus
- Black-winged lapwing, Vanellus melanopterus
- Crowned lapwing, Vanellus coronatus (A)
- Wattled lapwing, Vanellus senegallus
- Kittlitz's plover, Charadrius pecuarius
- Common ringed plover, Charadrius hiaticula (A)
- Three-banded plover, Charadrius tricollaris

== Painted-snipes ==
Order: Charadriiformes Family: Rostratulidae

Painted-snipes are short-legged, long-billed birds similar in shape to the true snipes, but more brightly coloured.

- Greater painted-snipe, Rostratula benghalensis

== Jacanas ==
Order: Charadriiformes Family: Jacanidae

The jacanas are a group of waders found throughout the tropics. They are identifiable by their huge feet and claws which enable them to walk on floating vegetation in the shallow lakes that are their preferred habitat.

- African jacana, Actophilornis africanus

== Sandpipers and allies ==
Order: Charadriiformes Family: Scolopacidae

Scolopacidae is a large diverse family of small to medium-sized shorebirds including the sandpipers, curlews, godwits, shanks, tattlers, woodcocks, snipes, dowitchers, and phalaropes. The majority of these species eat small invertebrates picked out of the mud or soil. Variation in length of legs and bills enables multiple species to feed in the same habitat, particularly on the coast, without direct competition for food.

- Eurasian curlew, Numenius arquata (A)
- Ruddy turnstone, Arenaria interpres (A)
- Ruff, Calidris pugnax
- Curlew sandpiper, Calidris ferruginea (A)
- Little stint, Calidris minuta
- African snipe, Gallinago nigripennis
- Common sandpiper, Actitis hypoleucos
- Common greenshank, Tringa nebularia
- Marsh sandpiper, Tringa stagnatilis (A)
- Wood sandpiper, Tringa glareola

== Buttonquails ==
Order: Charadriiformes Family: Turnicidae

The buttonquails are small, drab, running birds which resemble the true quails. The female is the brighter of the sexes and initiates courtship. The male incubates the eggs and tends the young.

- Small buttonquail, Turnix sylvaticus (A)

== Pratincoles and coursers ==
Order: Charadriiformes Family: Glareolidae

Glareolidae is a family of wading birds comprising the pratincoles, which have short legs, long pointed wings, and long forked tails, and the coursers, which have long legs, short wings, and long, pointed bills which curve downwards.

- Burchell's courser, Cursorius rufus
- Temminck's courser, Cursorius temminckii
- Double-banded courser, Smutsornis africanus
- Collared pratincole, Glareola pratincola (A)
- Black-winged pratincole, Glareola nordmanni

== Gulls, terns, and skimmers ==
Order: Charadriiformes Family: Laridae

Laridae is a family of medium to large seabirds, the gulls, terns, and skimmers. Gulls are typically grey or white, often with black markings on the head or wings. They have stout, longish bills and webbed feet. Terns are a group of generally medium to large seabirds typically with grey or white plumage, often with black markings on the head. Most terns hunt fish by diving but some pick insects off the surface of fresh water. Terns are generally long-lived birds, with several species known to live in excess of 30 years.

- Gray-hooded gull, Chroicocephalus cirrocephalus (A)
- White-winged tern, Chlidonias leucopterus (A)
- Whiskered tern, Chlidonias hybrida (A)

== Storks ==
Order: Ciconiiformes Family: Ciconiidae

Storks are large, long-legged, long-necked wading birds with long, stout bills. Storks are mute, but bill-clattering is an important mode of communication at the nest. Their nests can be large and may be reused for many years. Many species are migratory.

- Black stork, Ciconia nigra
- Abdim's stork, Ciconia abdimii
- White stork, Ciconia ciconia
- Yellow-billed stork, Mycteria ibis

== Anhingas ==
Order: Suliformes Family: Anhingidae

Anhingas or darters are often called "snake-birds" because of their long thin neck, which gives a snake-like appearance when they swim with their bodies submerged. The males have black and dark-brown plumage, an erectile crest on the nape and a larger bill than the female. The females have much paler plumage especially on the neck and underparts. The darters have completely webbed feet and their legs are short and set far back on the body. Their plumage is somewhat permeable, like that of cormorants, and they spread their wings to dry after diving.

- African darter, Anhinga rufa

== Cormorants and shags ==
Order: Suliformes Family: Phalacrocoracidae

Phalacrocoracidae is a family of medium to large fish-eating waterbirds that includes cormorants and shags. Plumage colouration varies, with the majority having mainly dark plumage, some species being black-and-white, and a few being colourful.

- Long-tailed cormorant, Microcarbo africanus
- Great cormorant, Phalacrocorax carbo (S)

== Hamerkop ==
Order: Pelecaniformes Family: Scopidae

The hamerkop is a medium-sized bird with a long shaggy crest. The shape of its head with a curved bill and crest at the back is reminiscent of a hammer, hence its name. Its plumage is drab-brown all over.

- Hamerkop, Scopus umbretta

== Herons, egrets, and bitterns ==
Order: Pelecaniformes Family: Ardeidae

The family Ardeidae contains the bitterns, herons, and egrets. Herons and egrets are medium to large wading birds with long necks and legs. Bitterns tend to be shorter necked and more wary. Members of Ardeidae fly with their necks retracted, unlike other long-necked birds such as storks, ibises, and spoonbills.

- Great bittern, Botaurus stellaris
- Little bittern, Ixobrychus minutus (A)
- Gray heron, Ardea cinerea
- Black-headed heron, Ardea melanocephala
- Goliath heron, Ardea goliath
- Purple heron, Ardea purpurea
- Great egret, Ardea alba
- Intermediate egret, Ardea intermedia (A)
- Little egret, Egretta garzetta (S)
- Cattle egret, Bubulcus ibis
- Squacco heron, Ardeola ralloides (A)
- Rufous-bellied heron, Ardeola rufiventris
- Black-crowned night-heron, Nycticorax nycticorax

== Ibises and spoonbills ==
Order: Pelecaniformes Family: Threskiornithidae

Threskiornithidae is a family of large terrestrial and wading birds which includes the ibises and spoonbills. They have long, broad wings with 11 primary and about 20 secondary feathers. They are strong fliers and despite their size and weight, very capable soarers.

- Glossy ibis, Plegadis falcinellus (A)
- African sacred ibis, Threskiornis aethiopicus
- Southern bald ibis, Geronticus calvus
- Hadada ibis, Bostrychia hagedash
- African spoonbill, Platalea alba

== Secretarybird ==
Order: Accipitriformes Family: Sagittariidae

The secretarybird is a bird of prey but is easily distinguished from other raptors by its long crane-like legs.

- Secretarybird, Sagittarius serpentarius

== Osprey ==
Order: Accipitriformes Family: Pandionidae

The family Pandionidae contains only one species, the osprey. The osprey is a medium-large raptor which is a specialist fish-eater with a worldwide distribution.

- Osprey, Pandion haliaetus

== Hawks, eagles, and kites ==
Order: Accipitriformes Family: Accipitridae

Accipitridae is a family of birds of prey which includes hawks, eagles, kites, harriers, and Old World vultures. These birds have powerful hooked beaks for tearing flesh from their prey, strong legs, powerful talons, and keen eyesight.

- Black-winged kite, Elanus caeruleus
- African harrier-hawk, Polyboroides typus
- Palm-nut vulture, Gypohierax angolensis (A)
- Bearded vulture, Gypaetus barbatus
- Egyptian vulture, Neophron percnopterus (A)
- Cape griffon, Gyps coprotheres
- Bateleur, Terathopius ecaudatus (A)
- Black-chested snake-eagle, Circaetus pectoralis (A)
- Long-crested eagle, Lophaetus occipitalis (A)
- Booted eagle, Hieraaetus pennatus
- Tawny eagle, Aquila rapax (A)
- Verreaux's eagle, Aquila verreauxii
- African hawk-eagle, Aquila spilogaster
- Pale chanting-goshawk, Melierax canorus (A)
- Gabar goshawk, Micronisus gabar (A)
- African marsh-harrier, Circus ranivorus
- Black harrier, Circus maurus
- Pallid harrier, Circus macrourus (A)
- Montagu's harrier, Circus pygargus
- African goshawk, Accipiter tachiro
- Shikra, Accipiter badius (A)
- Little sparrowhawk, Accipiter minullus (A)
- Rufous-breasted sparrowhawk, Accipiter rufiventris
- Black goshawk, Accipiter melanoleucus (A)
- Black kite, Milvus migrans (S)
- African fish-eagle, Haliaeetus vocifer
- Common buzzard, Buteo buteo
- Jackal buzzard, Buteo rufofuscus

== Barn-owls ==
Order: Strigiformes Family: Tytonidae

Barn-owls are medium to large owls with large heads and characteristic heart-shaped faces. They have long strong legs with powerful talons.

- African grass-owl, Tyto capensis
- Western barn owl, Tyto alba

== Owls ==
Order: Strigiformes Family: Strigidae

The typical owls are small to large solitary nocturnal birds of prey. They have large forward-facing eyes and ears, a hawk-like beak, and a conspicuous circle of feathers around each eye called a facial disk.

- African scops-owl, Otus senegalensis (A)
- Cape eagle-owl, Bubo capensis (A)
- Spotted eagle-owl, Bubo africanus
- Verreaux's eagle-owl, Bubo lacteus (Ex)
- Marsh owl, Asio capensis

== Mousebirds ==
Order: Coliiformes Family: Coliidae

The mousebirds are slender greyish or brown birds with soft, hairlike body feathers and very long thin tails. They are arboreal and scurry through the leaves like rodents in search of berries, fruit and buds. They are acrobatic and can feed upside down. All species have strong claws and reversible outer toes. They also have crests and stubby bills.

- Speckled mousebird, Colius striatus
- White-backed mousebird, Colius colius (A)
- Red-faced mousebird, Urocolius indicus

== Trogons ==
Order: Trogoniformes Family: Trogonidae

The family Trogonidae includes trogons and quetzals. Found in tropical woodlands worldwide, they feed on insects and fruit, and their broad bills and weak legs reflect their diet and arboreal habits. Although their flight is fast, they are reluctant to fly any distance. Trogons have soft, often colourful, feathers with distinctive male and female plumage.

- Narina trogon, Apaloderma narina

== Hoopoes ==
Order: Coraciiformes Family: Upupidae

Hoopoes have black, white, and orangey-pink colouring with a large erectile crest on their head.

- Eurasian hoopoe, Upupa epops

== Woodhoopoes and scimitarbills ==
Order: Bucerotiformes Family: Phoeniculidae

The woodhoopoes and scimitarbills are related to the hoopoes, ground-hornbills, and hornbills. They most resemble the hoopoes with their long curved bills, used to probe for insects, and short rounded wings. However, they differ in that they have metallic plumage, often blue, green, or purple, and lack an erectile crest.

- Green woodhoopoe, Phoeniculus purpureus (A)

== Kingfishers ==
Order: Coraciiformes Family: Alcedinidae

Kingfishers are medium-sized birds with large heads, long pointed bills, short legs, and stubby tails.

- Malachite kingfisher, Corythornis cristatus
- Giant kingfisher, Megaceryle maximus
- Pied kingfisher, Ceryle rudis

== Bee-eaters ==
Order: Coraciiformes Family: Meropidae

The bee-eaters are a group of near passerine birds in the family Meropidae. Most species are found in Africa but others occur in southern Europe, Madagascar, Australia, and New Guinea. They are characterised by richly coloured plumage, slender bodies, and usually elongated central tail feathers. They have long downturned bills and pointed wings, which give them a swallow-like appearance when seen from afar.

- White-fronted bee-eater, Merops bullockoides (A)
- European bee-eater, Merops apiaster

== Rollers ==
Order: Coraciiformes Family: Coraciidae

Rollers resemble crows in size and build, but are more closely related to the kingfishers and bee-eaters. They share the colourful appearance of those groups with blues and browns predominating. The two inner front toes are connected, but the outer toe is not.

- European roller, Coracias garrulus
- Lilac-breasted roller, Coracias caudatus

== African barbets ==
Order: Piciformes Family: Lybiidae

The barbets are plump birds, with short necks and large heads. They get their name from the bristles which fringe their heavy bills. Most species are brightly coloured.

- Crested barbet, Trachyphonus vaillantii
- Red-fronted tinkerbird, Pogoniulus pusillus
- Pied barbet, Tricholaema leucomelas
- Black-collared barbet, Lybius torquatus (A)

== Honeyguides ==
Order: Piciformes Family: Indicatoridae

Honeyguides are among the few birds that feed on wax. They are named for the greater honeyguide which leads traditional honey-hunters to bees' nests and, after the hunters have harvested the honey, feeds on the remaining contents of the hive.

- Wahlberg's honeyguide, Prodotiscus regulus
- Lesser honeyguide, Indicator minor (A)
- Greater honeyguide, Indicator indicator (A)

== Woodpeckers ==
Order: Piciformes Family: Picidae

Woodpeckers are small to medium-sized birds with chisel-like beaks, short legs, stiff tails, and long tongues used for capturing insects. Some species have feet with two toes pointing forward and two backward, while several species have only three toes. Many woodpeckers have the habit of tapping noisily on tree trunks with their beaks.

- Rufous-necked wryneck, Jynx ruficollis (A)
- Cardinal woodpecker, Chloropicus fuscescens
- Ground woodpecker, Geocolaptes olivaceus

== Falcons and caracaras ==
Order: Falconiformes Family: Falconidae

Falconidae is a family of diurnal birds of prey. They differ from hawks, eagles, and kites in that they kill with their beaks instead of their talons.

- Lesser kestrel, Falco naumanni
- Rock kestrel, Falco rupicolus
- Greater kestrel, Falco rupicoloides
- Red-footed falcon, Falco vespertinus
- Amur falcon, Falco amurensis
- Eurasian hobby, Falco subbuteo (A)
- Lanner falcon, Falco biarmicus
- Peregrine falcon, Falco peregrinus

== Old World orioles ==
Order: Passeriformes Family: Oriolidae

The Old World orioles are colourful passerine birds. They are not related to the New World orioles though they appear similar.

- Eurasian golden oriole, Oriolus oriolus
- African black-headed oriole, Oriolus larvatus (A)

== Wattle-eyes and batises ==
Order: Passeriformes Family: Platysteiridae

The wattle-eyes, or puffback flycatchers, are small stout passerine birds of the African tropics. They get their name from the brightly coloured fleshy eye decorations found in most species in this group.

- Cape batis, Batis capensis
- Chinspot batis, Batis molitor

== Bushshrikes and allies ==
Order: Passeriformes Family: Malaconotidae

Bushshrikes are similar in habits to shrikes, hunting insects and other small prey from a perch on a bush. Although similar in build to the shrikes, these tend to be either colourful species or largely black; some species are quite secretive.

- Black-backed puffback, Dryoscopus cubla (A)
- Southern boubou, Laniarius ferrugineus
- Bokmakierie, Telophorus zeylonus

== Drongos ==
Order: Passeriformes Family: Dicruridae

The drongos are mostly black or dark grey in colour, sometimes with metallic tints. They have long forked tails, and some Asian species have elaborate tail decorations. They have short legs and sit very upright when perched, like a shrike. They flycatch or take prey from the ground.

- Fork-tailed drongo, Dicrurus adsimilis

== Monarch flycatchers ==
Order: Passeriformes Family: Monarchidae

The monarch flycatchers are small to medium-sized insectivorous passerines which hunt by flycatching.

- African paradise-flycatcher, Terpsiphone viridis

== Shrikes ==
Order: Passeriformes Family: Laniidae

Shrikes are passerine birds known for their habit of catching other birds and small animals and impaling the uneaten portions of their bodies on thorns. A shrike's beak is hooked, like that of a typical bird of prey.

- Red-backed shrike, Lanius collurio
- Lesser gray shrike, Lanius minor (A)
- Southern fiscal, Lanius collaris

== Crows, jays, and magpies ==
Order: Passeriformes Family: Corvidae

The family Corvidae includes crows, ravens, jays, choughs, magpies, treepies, nutcrackers, and ground jays. Corvids are above average in size among the Passeriformes, and some of the larger species show high levels of intelligence.

- Cape crow, Corvus capensis
- Pied crow, Corvus albus
- White-necked raven, Corvus albicollis

== Rockjumpers ==
Order: Passeriformes Family: Chaetopidae

This species is one of only two in its family; both are endemic to far southern Africa.

- Drakensberg rockjumper, Chaetops aurantius

== Fairy flycatchers ==
Order: Passeriformes Family: Stenostiridae

Most of the species of this small family are found in Africa, though a few inhabit tropical Asia. They are not closely related to other birds called "flycatchers".

- Fairy flycatcher, Stenostira scita

== Tits, chickadees, and titmice ==
Order: Passeriformes Family: Paridae

The Paridae are mainly small stocky woodland species with short stout bills. Some have crests. They are adaptable birds, with a mixed diet including seeds and insects.

- Ashy tit, Melaniparus cinerascens
- Gray tit, Melaniparus afer

== Larks ==
Order: Passeriformes Family: Alaudidae

Larks are small terrestrial birds with often extravagant songs and display flights. Most larks are fairly dull in appearance. Their food is insects and seeds.

- Spike-heeled lark, Chersomanes albofasciata (A)
- Eastern long-billed lark, Certhilauda semitorquata
- Chestnut-backed sparrow-lark, Eremopterix leucotis
- Gray-backed sparrow-lark, Eremopterix verticalis (A)
- Rudd's lark, Heteromirafra ruddi (A)
- Cape clapper lark, Mirafra apiata
- Rufous-naped lark, Mirafra africana
- Red-capped lark, Calandrella cinerea
- Pink-billed lark, Spizocorys conirostris (A)
- Large-billed lark, Galerida magnirostris

== African warblers ==
Order: Passeriformes Family: Macrosphenidae

African warblers are small to medium-sized insectivores which are found in a wide variety of habitats south of the Sahara.

- Cape crombec, Sylvietta rufescens (A)
- Cape grassbird, Sphenoeacus afer

== Cisticolas and allies ==
Order: Passeriformes Family: Cisticolidae

The Cisticolidae are warblers found mainly in warmer southern regions of the Old World. They are generally very small birds of drab brown or grey appearance found in open country such as grassland or scrub.

- Yellow-bellied eremomela, Eremomela icteropygialis
- Namaqua warbler, Phragmacia substriata (A)
- Bar-throated apalis, Apalis thoracica
- Yellow-breasted apalis, Apalis flavida
- Tawny-flanked prinia, Prinia subflava (A)
- Black-chested prinia, Prinia flavicans (A)
- Karoo prinia, Prinia maculosa
- Drakensberg prinia, Prinia hypoxantha
- Rock-loving cisticola, Cisticola aberrans
- Wailing cisticola, Cisticola lais
- Levaillant's cisticola, Cisticola tinniens
- Piping cisticola, Cisticola fulvicapillus
- Zitting cisticola, Cisticola juncidis
- Desert cisticola, Cisticola aridulus
- Cloud cisticola, Cisticola textrix
- Wing-snapping cisticola, Cisticola ayresii

== Reed warblers and allies ==
Order: Passeriformes Family: Acrocephalidae

The members of this family are usually rather large for "warblers". Most are rather plain olivaceous brown above with much yellow to beige below. They are usually found in open woodland, reedbeds, or tall grass. The family occurs mostly in southern to western Eurasia and surroundings, but it also ranges far into the Pacific, with some species in Africa.

- African yellow-warbler, Iduna natalensis
- Sedge warbler, Acrocephalus schoenobaenus
- Common reed warbler, Acrocephalus scirpaceus
- Lesser swamp warbler, Acrocephalus gracilirostris
- Great reed warbler, Acrocephalus arundinaceus

== Grassbirds and allies ==
Order: Passeriformes Family: Locustellidae

Locustellidae are a family of small insectivorous songbirds found mainly in Eurasia, Africa, and the Australian region. They are smallish birds with tails that are usually long and pointed, and tend to be drab brownish or buffy all over.

- Barratt's warbler, Bradypterus barratti
- Little rush warbler, Bradypterus baboecala

== Swallows ==
Order: Passeriformes Family: Hirundinidae

The family Hirundinidae is adapted to aerial feeding. They have a slender streamlined body, long pointed wings, and a short bill with a wide gape. The feet are adapted to perching rather than walking, and the front toes are partially joined at the base.

- Plain martin, Riparia paludicola
- Bank swallow, Riparia riparia (A)
- Banded martin, Neophedina cincta
- Rock martin, Ptyonoprogne fuligula
- Barn swallow, Hirundo rustica
- White-throated swallow, Hirundo albigularis
- Pearl-breasted swallow, Hirundo dimidiata
- Montane blue swallow, Hirundo atrocaerulea
- Greater striped swallow, Cecropis cucullata
- Lesser striped swallow, Cecropis abyssinica
- Rufous-chested swallow, Cecropis semirufa (A)
- South African swallow, Petrochelidon spilodera (A)
- Common house-martin, Delichon urbicum
- Black sawwing, Psalidoprocne pristoptera (A)

== Bulbuls ==
Order: Passeriformes Family: Pycnonotidae

Bulbuls are medium-sized songbirds. Some are colourful with yellow, red or orange vents, cheeks, throats or supercilia, but most are drab, with uniform olive-brown to black plumage. Some species have distinct crests.

- Common bulbul, Pycnonotus barbatus
- Black-fronted bulbul, Pycnonotus nigricans

== Leaf warblers ==
Order: Passeriformes Family: Phylloscopidae

Leaf warblers are a family of small insectivorous birds found mostly in Eurasia and ranging into Wallacea and Africa. The species are of various sizes, often green-plumaged above and yellow below, or more subdued with greyish-green to greyish-brown colours.

- Willow warbler, Phylloscopus trochilus

== Sylviid warblers, parrotbills, and allies ==
Order: Passeriformes Family: Sylviidae

The family Sylviidae ("Old World warblers") is a group of small insectivorous passerine birds. They mainly occur as breeding species, as one common name implies, in Europe, Asia, and, to a lesser extent, Africa. Most are of generally undistinguished appearance, but many have distinctive songs.

- Garden warbler, Sylvia borin (A)
- Bush blackcap, Sylvia nigricapilla
- Layard's warbler, Curruca layardi
- Chestnut-vented warbler, Curruca subcoerulea (A)
- Greater whitethroat, Curruca communis (A)

== White-eyes, yuhinas, and allies ==
Order: Passeriformes Family: Zosteropidae

The white-eyes are small and mostly undistinguished, their plumage above being generally some dull colour like greenish-olive, but some species have a white or bright yellow throat, breast, or lower parts, and several have buff flanks. As their name suggests, many species have a white ring around each eye.

- Orange River white-eye, Zosterops pallidus
- Cape white-eye, Zosterops virens

== Starlings ==
Order: Passeriformes Family: Sturnidae

Starlings are small to medium-sized passerine birds. Their flight is strong and direct and they are very gregarious. Their preferred habitat is fairly open country. They eat insects and fruit. Plumage is typically dark with a metallic sheen.

- European starling, Sturnus vulgaris (I)
- Wattled starling, Creatophora cinerea
- Common myna, Acridotheres tristis (I)
- Violet-backed starling, Cinnyricinclus leucogaster (A)
- Pale-winged starling, Onychognathus nabouroup
- Red-winged starling, Onychognathus morio
- African pied starling, Lamprotornis bicolor
- Cape starling, Lamprotornis nitens

== Thrushes and allies ==
Order: Passeriformes Family: Turdidae

The thrushes are a group of passerine birds that occur mainly in the Old World. They are plump, soft plumaged, small to medium-sized insectivores or sometimes omnivores, often feeding on the ground. Many have attractive songs.

- Kurrichane thrush, Turdus libonyana (A)
- Olive thrush, Turdus olivaceus
- Karoo thrush, Turdus smithi

== Old World flycatchers ==
Order: Passeriformes Family: Muscicapidae

Old World flycatchers are a large group of small passerine birds native to the Old World. They are mainly small arboreal insectivores. The appearance of these birds is highly varied, but they mostly have weak songs and harsh calls.

- African dusky flycatcher, Muscicapa adusta (A)
- Spotted flycatcher, Muscicapa striata
- Fiscal flycatcher, Melaenornis silens (A)
- Karoo scrub-robin, Tychaedon coryphoeus (A)
- Cape robin-chat, Cossypha caffra
- Sentinel rock-thrush, Monticola explorator
- Cape rock-thrush, Monticola rupestris
- African stonechat, Saxicola torquatus
- Buff-streaked chat, Campicoloises bifasciatus (A)
- Sickle-winged chat, Emarginata sinuata
- Mocking cliff-chat, Thamnolaea cinnamomeiventris (A)
- Southern anteater-chat, Myrmecocichla formicivora (A)
- Mountain wheatear, Myrmecocichla monticola
- Capped wheatear, Oenanthe pileata
- Familiar chat, Oenanthe familiaris

== Sugarbirds ==
Order: Passeriformes Family: Promeropidae

The two species in this family are restricted to southern Africa. They have brownish plumage, a long downcurved bill, and long tail feathers.

- Gurney's sugarbird, Promerops gurneyi

== Sunbirds and spiderhunters ==
Order: Passeriformes Family: Nectariniidae

The sunbirds and spiderhunters are very small passerine birds which feed largely on nectar, although they will also take insects, especially when feeding young. Flight is fast and direct on their short wings. Most species can take nectar by hovering like a hummingbird, but usually perch to feed.

- Collared sunbird, Hedydipna collaris (A)
- Amethyst sunbird, Chalcomitra amethystina
- Malachite sunbird, Nectarinia famosa
- Southern double-collared sunbird, Cinnyris chalybeus
- Greater double-collared sunbird, Cinnyris afer
- White-breasted sunbird, Cinnyris talatala

== Weavers and allies ==
Order: Passeriformes Family: Ploceidae

The weavers are small passerine birds related to the finches. They are seed-eating birds with rounded conical bills. The males of many species are brightly coloured, usually in red or yellow and black, though some species show variation in colour only in the breeding season.

- White-browed sparrow-weaver, Plocepasser mahali (A)
- Spectacled weaver, Ploceus ocularis (A)
- Cape weaver, Ploceus capensis
- Southern masked-weaver, Ploceus velatus
- Village weaver, Ploceus cucullatus
- Red-billed quelea, Quelea quelea
- Southern red bishop, Euplectes orix
- Yellow-crowned bishop, Euplectes afer
- Yellow bishop, Euplectes capensis
- White-winged widowbird, Euplectes albonotatus
- Red-collared widowbird, Euplectes ardens
- Fan-tailed widowbird, Euplectes axillaris (A)
- Long-tailed widowbird, Euplectes progne

== Waxbills and allies ==
Order: Passeriformes Family: Estrildidae

The estrildid finches are small passerine birds of the Old World tropics and Australasia. They are gregarious and often colonial seed eaters with short thick but pointed bills. They are all similar in structure and habits, but have wide variation in plumage colours and patterns.

- Swee waxbill, Coccopygia melanotis
- Common waxbill, Estrilda astrild
- Quailfinch, Ortygospiza fuscocrissa
- Red-headed finch, Amadina erythrocephala
- Zebra waxbill, Amandava subflava
- Red-billed firefinch, Lagonosticta senegala (A)

== Indigobirds ==
Order: Passeriformes Family: Viduidae

The indigobirds are finch-like species which usually have black or indigo predominating in their plumage. All are brood parasites which lay their eggs in the nests of estrildid finches.

- Pin-tailed whydah, Vidua macroura
- Village indigobird, Vidua chalybeata
- Parasitic weaver, Anomalospiza imberbis

== Old World sparrows ==
Order: Passeriformes Family: Passeridae

Sparrows are small passerine birds. In general, sparrows tend to be small, plump, brown, or grey birds with short tails and short powerful beaks. Sparrows are seed eaters, but they also consume small insects.

- House sparrow, Passer domesticus (I)
- Great rufous sparrow, Passer motitensis
- Cape sparrow, Passer melanurus
- Southern gray-headed sparrow, Passer diffusus
- Yellow-throated bush sparrow, Gymnoris superciliaris

== Wagtails and pipits ==
Order: Passeriformes Family: Motacillidae

Motacillidae is a family of small passerine birds with medium to long tails. They are slender ground-feeding insectivores of open country.

- Cape wagtail, Motacilla capensis
- Mountain wagtail, Motacilla clara
- African pied wagtail, Motacilla aguimp (A)
- African pipit, Anthus cinnamomeus
- Mountain pipit, Anthus hoeschi
- Nicholson's pipit, Anthus nicholsoni
- Plain-backed pipit, Anthus leucophrys (A)
- Buffy pipit, Anthus vaalensis
- Yellow-tufted pipit, Anthus crenatus
- Yellow-breasted pipit, Hemimacronyx chloris (S)
- Orange-throated longclaw, Macronyx capensis

== Finches, euphonias, and allies ==
Order: Passeriformes Family: Fringillidae

Finches are seed-eating passerine birds that are small to moderately large and have a strong beak, usually conical and in some species very large. All have twelve tail feathers and nine primaries. These birds have a bouncing flight with alternating bouts of flapping and gliding on closed wings, and most sing well.

- Yellow-fronted canary, Crithagra mozambicus (A)
- Black-throated canary, Crithagra atrogularis
- Brimstone canary, Crithagra sulphuratus (A)
- Yellow canary, Crithagra flaviventris
- White-throated canary, Crithagra albogularis
- Streaky-headed seedeater, Crithagra gularis
- Drakensberg siskin, Crithagra symonsi
- Cape canary, Serinus canicollis
- Black-headed canary, Serinus alario

== Old World buntings ==
Order: Passeriformes Family: Emberizidae

The emberizids are a large family of passerine birds. They are seed-eating birds with distinctively shaped bills. Many emberizid species have distinctive head patterns.

- Golden-breasted bunting, Emberiza flaviventris (A)
- Cape bunting, Emberiza capensis
- Lark-like bunting, Emberiza impetuani (A)
- Cinnamon-breasted bunting, Emberiza tahapisi

== See also ==
- List of birds
- Lists of birds by region
