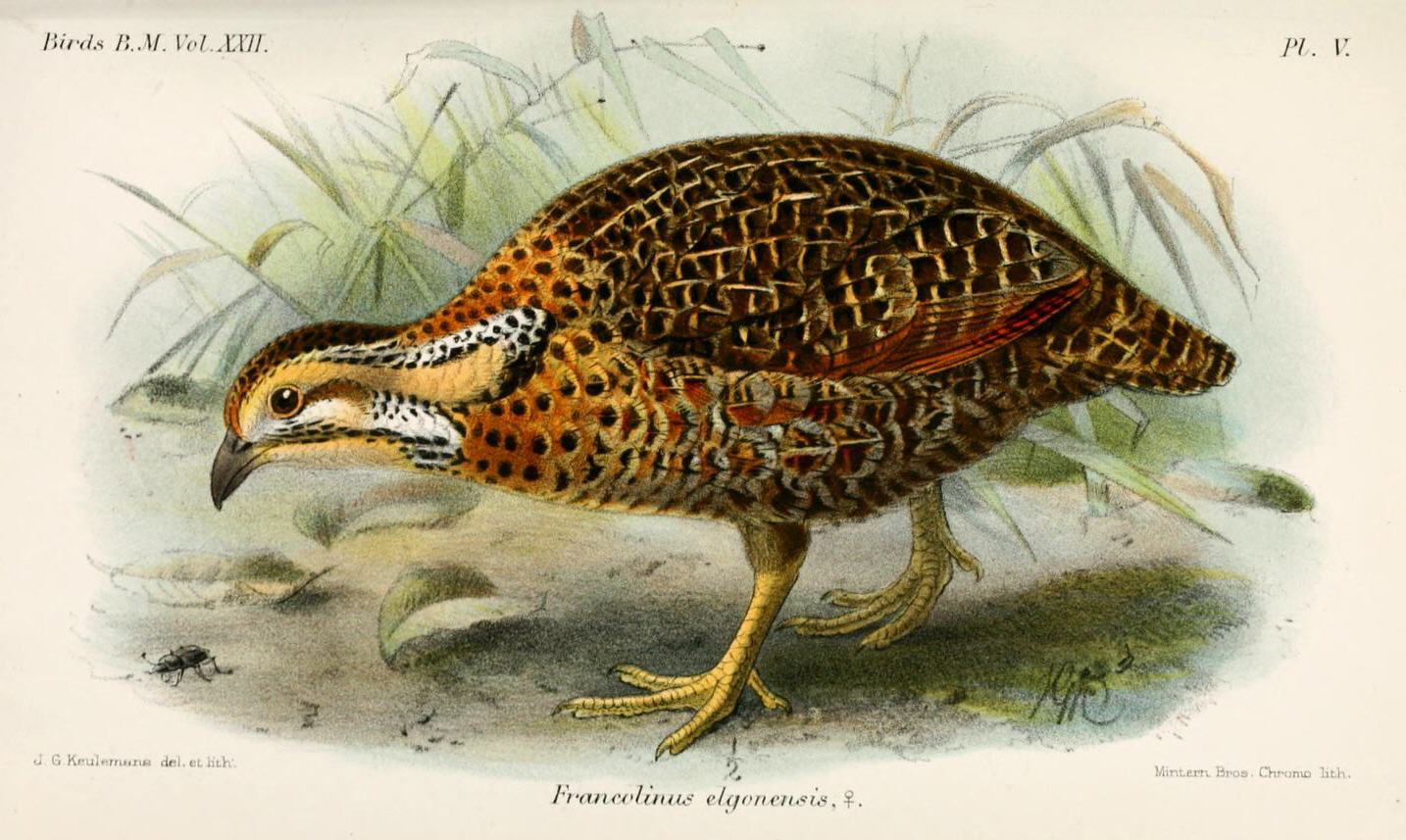
- Illustration by Keulemans, 1893
- In Central Province, Kenya

Conservation status
- Least Concern (IUCN 3.1)

Scientific classification
- Kingdom: Animalia
- Phylum: Chordata
- Class: Aves
- Order: Galliformes
- Family: Phasianidae
- Genus: Scleroptila
- Species: S. elgonensis

Binomial name
- Scleroptila elgonensis (Ogilvie-Grant, 1891)

Synonyms
- Scleroptila psilolaema elgonensis Scleroptila shelleyi elgonensis Francolinus elgonensis Francolinus psilolaema elgonensis Francolinus shelleyi elgonensis

= Elgon francolin =

Species of bird

The Elgon francolin (Scleroptila elgonensis) is a francolin found in moorland at altitudes above 2,300 metres (7,500 ft) from eastern Uganda (Mount Elgon) to central Kenya.

It was described by Ogilvie-Grant in 1891 as Francolinus elgonensis, and some authorities still use the genus Francolinus for all members otherwise placed in Scleroptila. It was previously considered a subspecies of the moorland francolin (S. psilolaema), which is now thought to be endemic to Ethiopia. Alternatively, it was suggested as a subspecies of the Shelley's francolin (S. shelleyi elgonensis), or even a hybrid between the moorland and red-winged francolins. However, it was split as a distinct species by the IUCN Red List and BirdLife International in 2014, and by the International Ornithological Congress in 2022 based on a 2019 study. The Elgon francolin resembles the moorland francolin, but the latter is duller (less rufescent) and has a black-dotted throat, and also differs in vocalizations.
