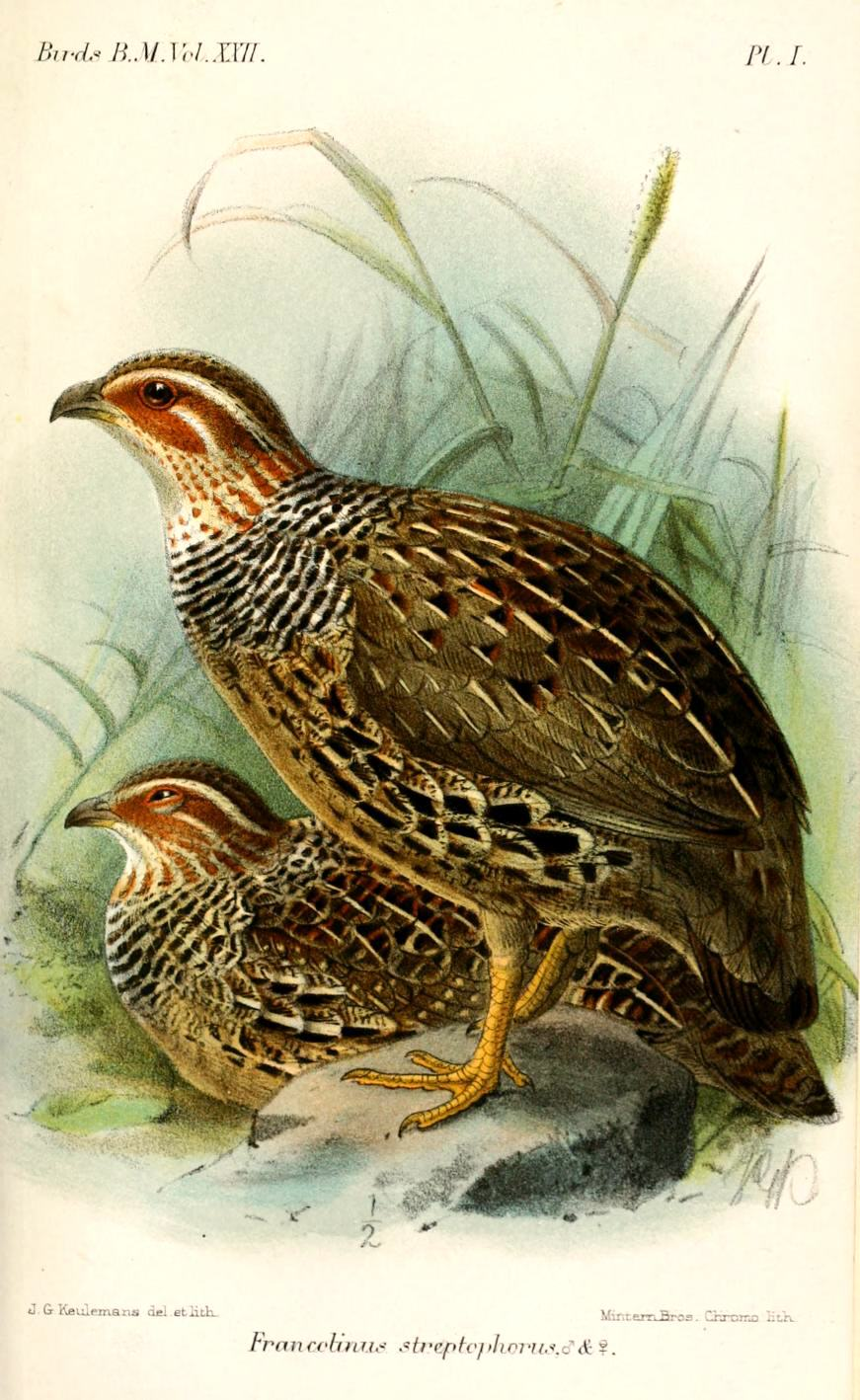
- Ring-necked francolin

Scientific classification
- Kingdom: Animalia
- Phylum: Chordata
- Class: Aves
- Order: Galliformes
- Family: Phasianidae
- Tribe: Gallini
- Genus: Scleroptila; Blyth, 1852

Type species
- Perdix levaillantii Valenciennes, 1825

Species
- See text

Synonyms
- Francolinus

= Scleroptila =

Genus of birds

Scleroptila is a genus of birds in the francolin group of the tribe Gallini of the pheasant family. Its nine species range through Sub-Saharan Africa.

== Taxonomy ==
The genus Scleroptila was introduced in 1852 by the English zoologist Edward Blyth. The genus name combines the Ancient Greek σκληρος/sklēros meaning "stiff" with πτιλον/ptilon meaning "feather". Blyth listed two species in the genus but did not specify the type. In 1893 William Robert Ogilvie-Grant designated the type as Perdix levaillantii Valenciennes, 1825, the red-winged francolin.

The genus contains nine species are:

Image	Common name	Scientific name	Distribution
	Ring-necked francolin	Scleroptila streptophora	Burundi, Cameroon, Kenya, Rwanda, Tanzania, and Uganda.
	Red-winged francolin	Scleroptila levaillantii	Angola, Burundi, Democratic Republic of the Congo, Kenya, Lesotho, Malawi, Rwanda, South Africa, Eswatini, Tanzania, Uganda, and Zambia
	Finsch's francolin	Scleroptila finschi	Angola, Republic of the Congo, Democratic Republic of the Congo, parts of Cameroon, and Gabon
	Moorland francolin	Scleroptila psilolaema	Ethiopia
	Grey-winged francolin	Scleroptila afra	Lesotho and South Africa
	Orange River francolin	Scleroptila gutturalis	Ethiopia, South Sudan, Somalia, Uganda and Kenya
	Shelley's francolin	Scleroptila shelleyi	Kenya, Mozambique, Rwanda, South Africa, Eswatini, Tanzania, Uganda, and Zimbabwe
	Whyte's francolin	Scleroptila whytei	Democratic Republic of the Congo, Malawi, and Zambia
	Elgon francolin	Scleroptila elgonensis	Uganda (Mount Elgon) to central Kenya
