= Whyte's francolin =

Conservation status
- Least Concern (IUCN 3.1)

Scientific classification
- Kingdom: Animalia
- Phylum: Chordata
- Class: Aves
- Order: Galliformes
- Family: Phasianidae
- Genus: Scleroptila
- Species: S. whytei

Binomial name
- Scleroptila whytei (Neumann, 1908)

Species of bird

Whyte's francolin (Scleroptila whytei) is a species of bird in the family Phasianidae. It is found in grassy woodlands and grasslands in Democratic Republic of the Congo, Malawi, and Zambia.
