= Yewei =

Form of game in Chinese cuisine

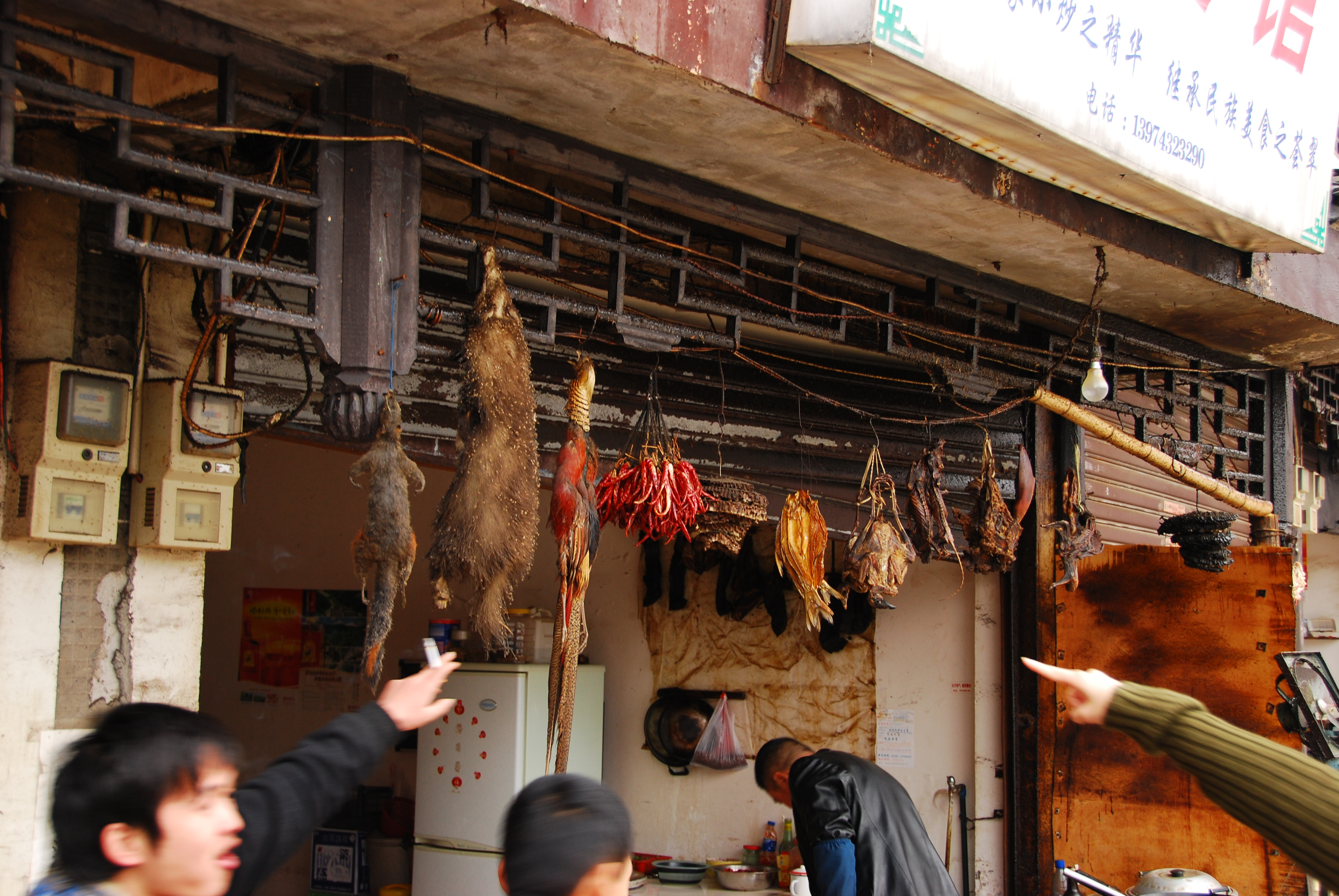
- Ye wei in Hunan
- Chinese: 野味
- Literal meaning: wild taste
Transcriptions
Standard Mandarin
- Hanyu Pinyin: yěwèi
Yue: Cantonese
- Jyutping: je5 mei6*2

Yewei (Chinese: 野味; pinyin: yě wèi; lit. 'wild taste') is a Chinese term that describes various types of bushmeat from wild animals.

== Terminology ==
The character 野 (pinyin: yě) means "wild", and is shortened from 野兽 (Traditional Chinese: 野獸; pinyin: yěshòu), which means "wild beasts".

The character 味 (pinyin: wèi) literally means "taste", and metaphorically refers to various delicacies that appeals to the popular palate.

== History ==
Historically, members of the imperial courts in Chinese dynastic eras requested grand animals for their meals. Famous examples include the Manchu Han Imperial Feast. Today, yewei can be eaten by anyone with access to wild animals, which can also be imported.

== Animals eaten ==
Yewei can include badgers, bats, beavers, civets, crocodiles, foxes, giant salamanders, hedgehog, marmots, ostrich, otters, pangolins, peacocks, pheasants, porcupines, rabbit and rabbit organs, rats, snakes (including many-banded krait), spotted deer, turtles and wolf pups.

== Culture ==
It has been reported that the consumption of wildlife appeals only to a minority of people in China. However, the topic of whether it should be consumed has had some mixed reactions. According to a 2006 survey by WildAid and the China Wildlife Conservation Association, about 70% of 24,000 people surveyed in 16 cities in mainland China had not eaten wild animals in the previous year, up from 51% in a similar 1999 survey.

In a 2014 survey of several cities in China, 52.7% of respondents agreed with the statement that wildlife should not be consumed.

According to The Guardian in an article back in 2014, some locals in Southern China sometimes boast that they will "eat anything with four legs except a table".

The consumption of exotic wildlife, especially in some provinces in the southern part of the nation, came under heavy criticism after the SARS epidemic. Following the outbreak of COVID-19, the Chinese government formally made the practice illegal, amidst growing calls inside China to permanently ban the wildlife trade.
