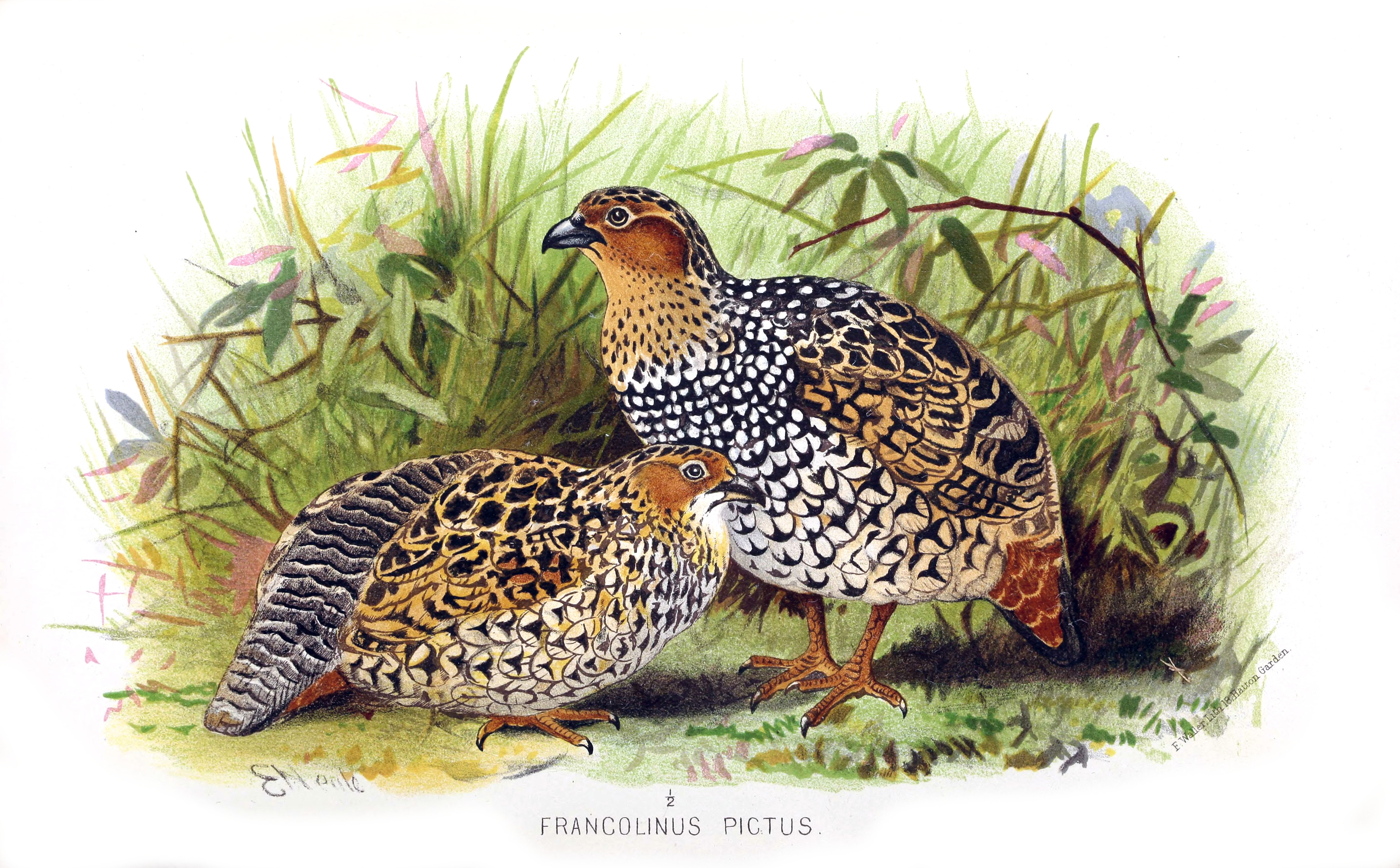
- Painted francolin

Scientific classification
- Kingdom: Animalia
- Phylum: Chordata
- Class: Aves
- Order: Galliformes
- Family: Phasianidae
- Tribe: Gallini
- Genus: Francolinus; Stephens, 1819

Type species
- Francolinus vulgaris Stephens, 1819 = Tetrao francolinus Linnaeus, 1766

Species
- See text

= Francolinus =

Genus of birds

Francolinus is a genus of birds in the francolin group of the tribe Gallini in the pheasant family.

== Species ==
Its three species range from western Asia and central Asia through to southern Asia and south-eastern Asia. The species are:

Genus Francolinus – Stephens, 1819 – three species
Common name	Scientific name and subspecies	Range	Size and ecology	IUCN status and estimated population
Black francolin Male Female	Francolinus francolinus (Linnaeus, 1766) Six subspecies: F. f. francolinus (Linnaeus, 1766); F. f. arabistanicus (Zarudny and Harms, 1913); F. f. asiae (Bonaparte, 1856); F. f. henrici (Bonaparte, 1856); F. f. bogdanovi (Zarudny, 1906); F. f. melanonotus (Hume, 1888)	south-eastern Turkey through Iran, Turkmenistan, northeast India, and Kazipara, Panchagarh of Bangladesh	Size: Habitat: Diet:	LC
Painted francolin	Francolinus pictus (Jardine & Selby, 1828)	central and southern India and southeastern Sri Lanka	Size: Habitat: Diet:	LC
Chinese francolin	Francolinus pintadeanus (Scopoli, 1786)	Cambodia, China, India, Laos, Myanmar, Philippines, Thailand, and Vietnam. Introduced to Mauritius, the Philippines, Madagascar, United States, Chile and Argentina.	Size: Habitat: Diet:	LC
