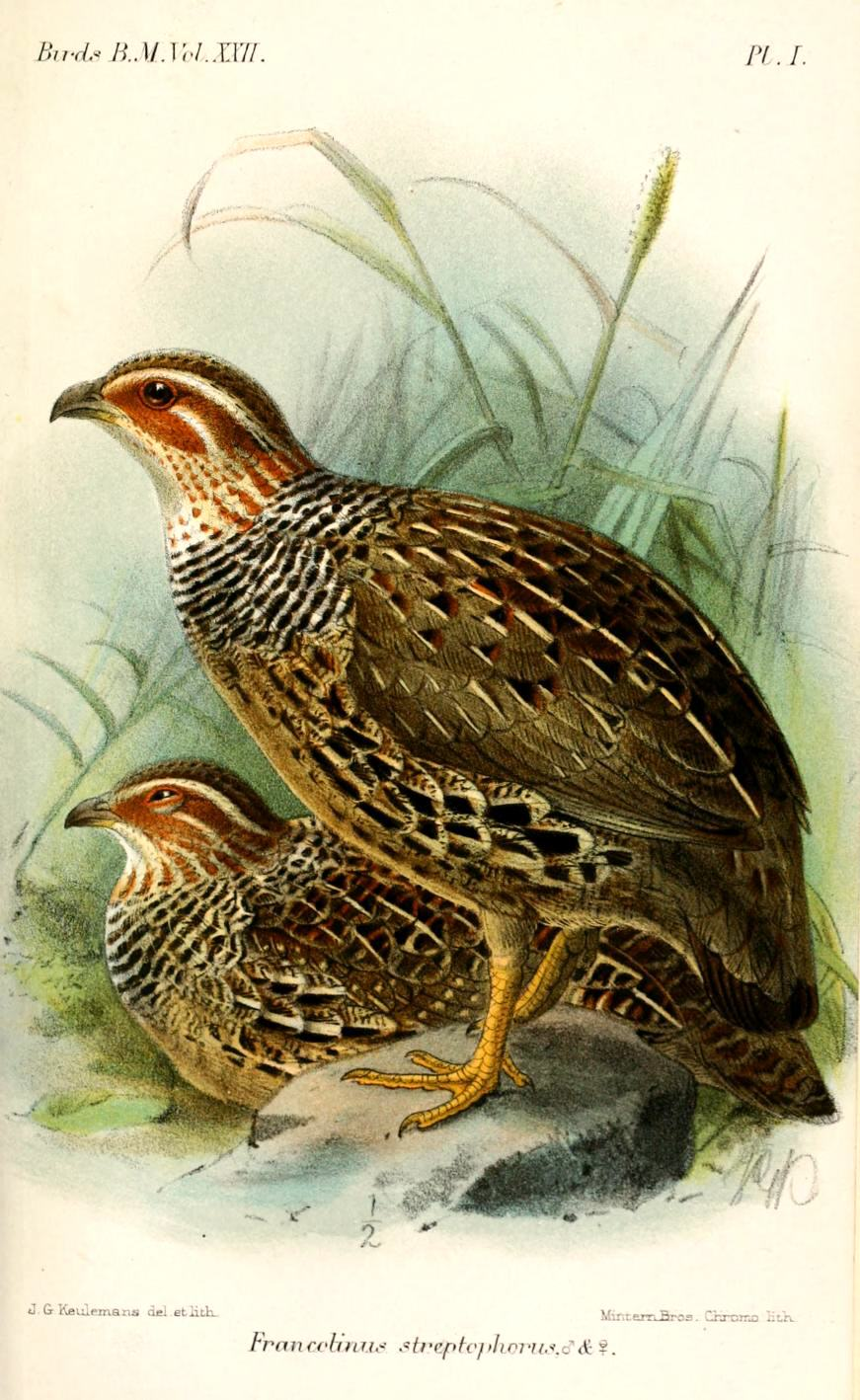
- Illustration by Keulemans, 1893

Conservation status
- Least Concern (IUCN 3.1)

Scientific classification
- Kingdom: Animalia
- Phylum: Chordata
- Class: Aves
- Order: Galliformes
- Family: Phasianidae
- Genus: Scleroptila
- Species: S. streptophora

Binomial name
- Scleroptila streptophora (Ogilvie-Grant, 1891)

Synonyms
- Francolinus streptophorus; Scleroptila streptophorus

= Ring-necked francolin =

Species of bird

The ring-necked francolin (Scleroptila streptophora) is a bird species in the family Phasianidae. It is found in Burundi, Cameroon, Kenya, Rwanda, Tanzania, and Uganda. Rarer than previously believed, it was uplisted from a species of Least Concern to Near Threatened status in the 2007 IUCN Red List. This status persisted until the most recent assessment on 8th July 2024, when it was returned to Least Concern.
