= Finsch's francolin =

Conservation status
- Least Concern (IUCN 3.1)

Scientific classification
- Kingdom: Animalia
- Phylum: Chordata
- Class: Aves
- Order: Galliformes
- Family: Phasianidae
- Genus: Scleroptila
- Species: S. finschi

Binomial name
- Scleroptila finschi (Barboza du Bocage, 1881)

Synonyms
- Francolinus finschi

Species of bird

Finsch's francolin (Scleroptila finschi) is a species of bird in the family Phasianidae. It is found in Angola, Republic of the Congo, Democratic Republic of the Congo, parts of Cameroon, and Gabon.

The common name and scientific name commemorate the German ethnographer, naturalist and colonial explorer Friedrich Hermann Otto Finsch (8 August 1839 - 31 January 1917, Braunschweig).
