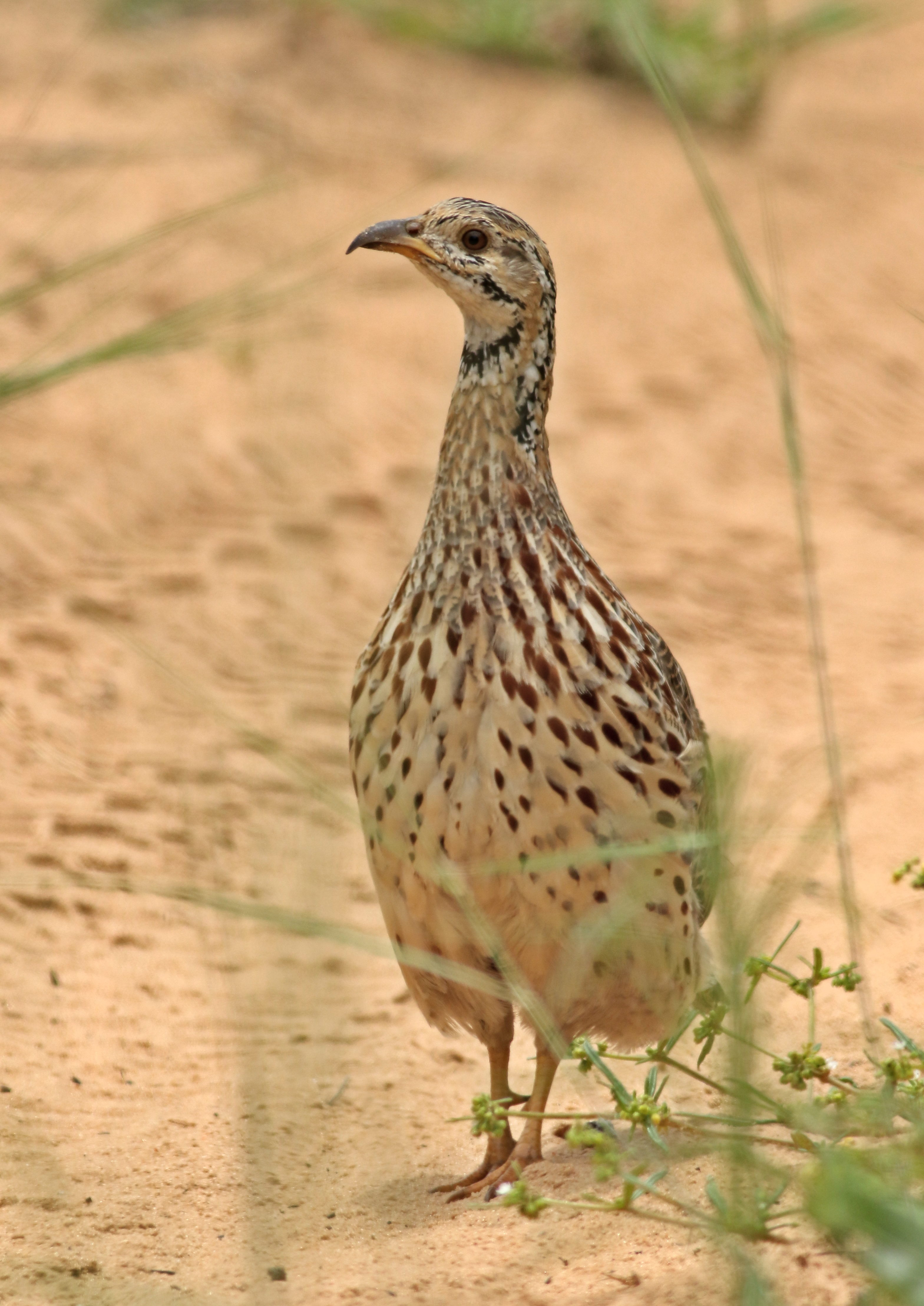

Conservation status
- Least Concern (IUCN 3.1)

Scientific classification
- Kingdom: Animalia
- Phylum: Chordata
- Class: Aves
- Order: Galliformes
- Family: Phasianidae
- Genus: Scleroptila
- Species: S. gutturalis

Binomial name
- Scleroptila gutturalis (Rüppell, 1835)

Synonyms
- Francolinus levaillantoides

= Orange River francolin =

Species of bird

The Orange River francolin (Scleroptila gutturalis) is a species of bird in the family Phasianidae found in grassland and woodland in Africa. In the taxa from the northern part of its distribution (Ethiopia, South Sudan, Somalia, Uganda and Kenya), the neck-line does not reach the eye and the belly is whitish. In the southern taxa (Angola, Namibia, Botswana, South Africa and Lesotho) the neck-line reaches the eye and the belly is buff. This has led some authorities to treat them as separate species: The Archer's or acacia francolin (S. gutturalis with subspecies lorti) in the north, and the Orange River francolin (S. levaillantoides with subspecies jugularis) in the south.

== Taxonomy ==
Scleroptila gutturalis levalliantoides (Smith, 1836) was made available as levalliantoides. The name is probably misspelled, and can easily be confused with Scleroptila levaillantii. Both are likely named after Francois Levaillant.
