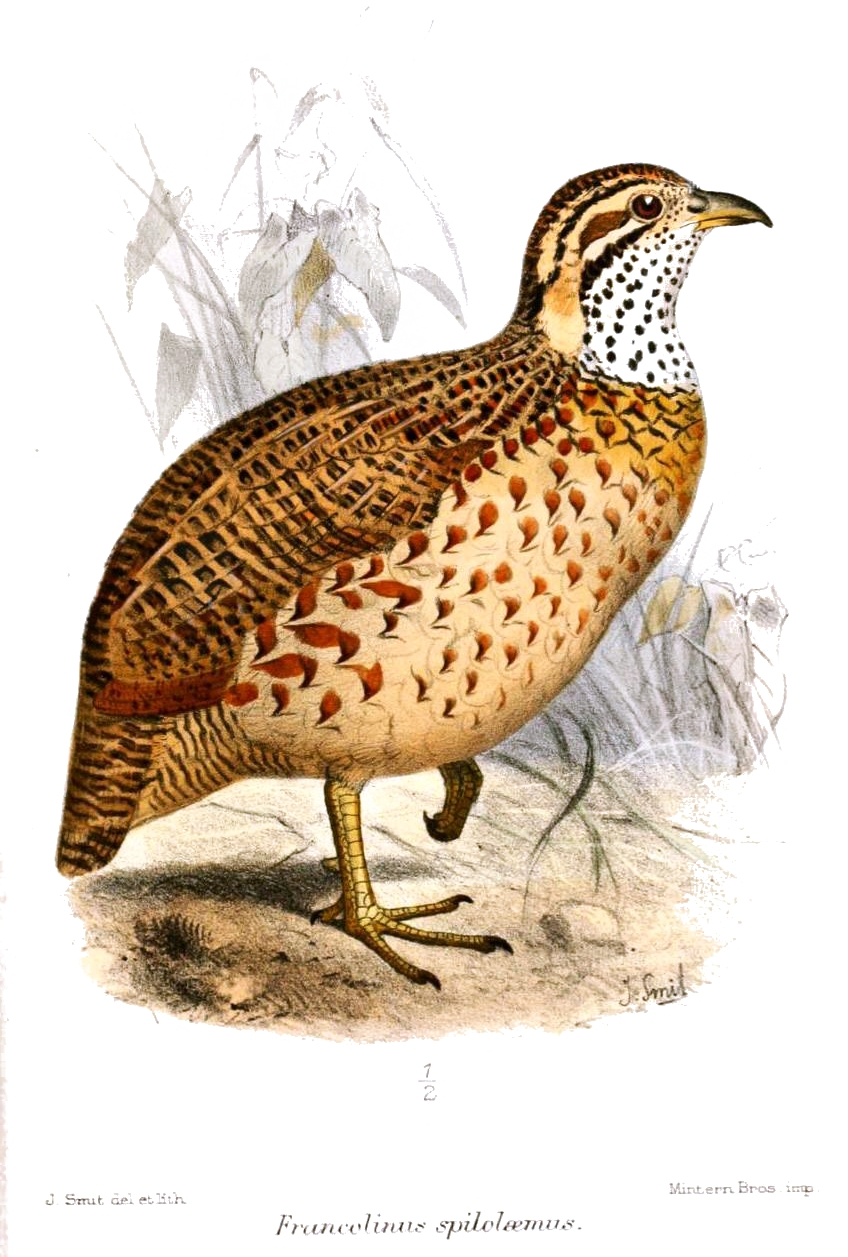
- Illustration of S. psilolaema by Joseph Smit, 1893
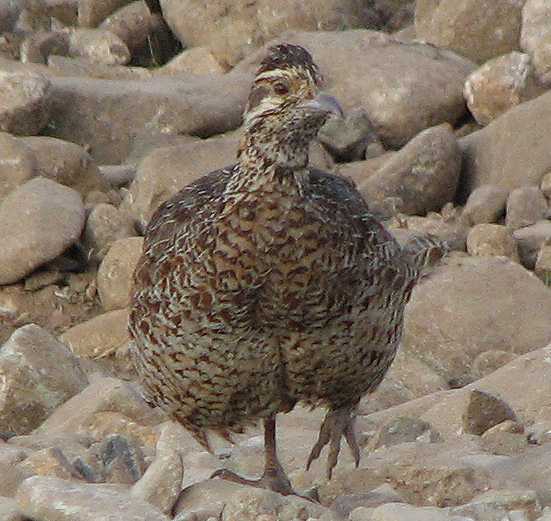

Conservation status
- Least Concern (IUCN 3.1)

Scientific classification
- Kingdom: Animalia
- Phylum: Chordata
- Class: Aves
- Order: Galliformes
- Family: Phasianidae
- Genus: Scleroptila
- Species: S. psilolaema

Binomial name
- Scleroptila psilolaema (Gray, GR, 1867)

Synonyms
- Francolinus psilolaemus; Scleroptila psilolaemus

= Moorland francolin =

Species of bird

The moorland francolin (Scleroptila psilolaema) is a species of bird in the family Phasianidae.

== Distribution ==
It is endemic to the Ethiopian montane moorlands.

== Taxonomy ==
The Elgon francolin of the highlands of Kenya and Uganda was formerly considered a subspecies of S. psilolaema, but was split as a distinct species by the IUCN Red List and BirdLife International in 2014, and by the International Ornithological Congress in 2022 based on a 2019 study. Compared to the moorland francolin, the Elgon francolin is brighter (more rufescent) and lacks black spots to the throat, and also differs in vocalizations.
