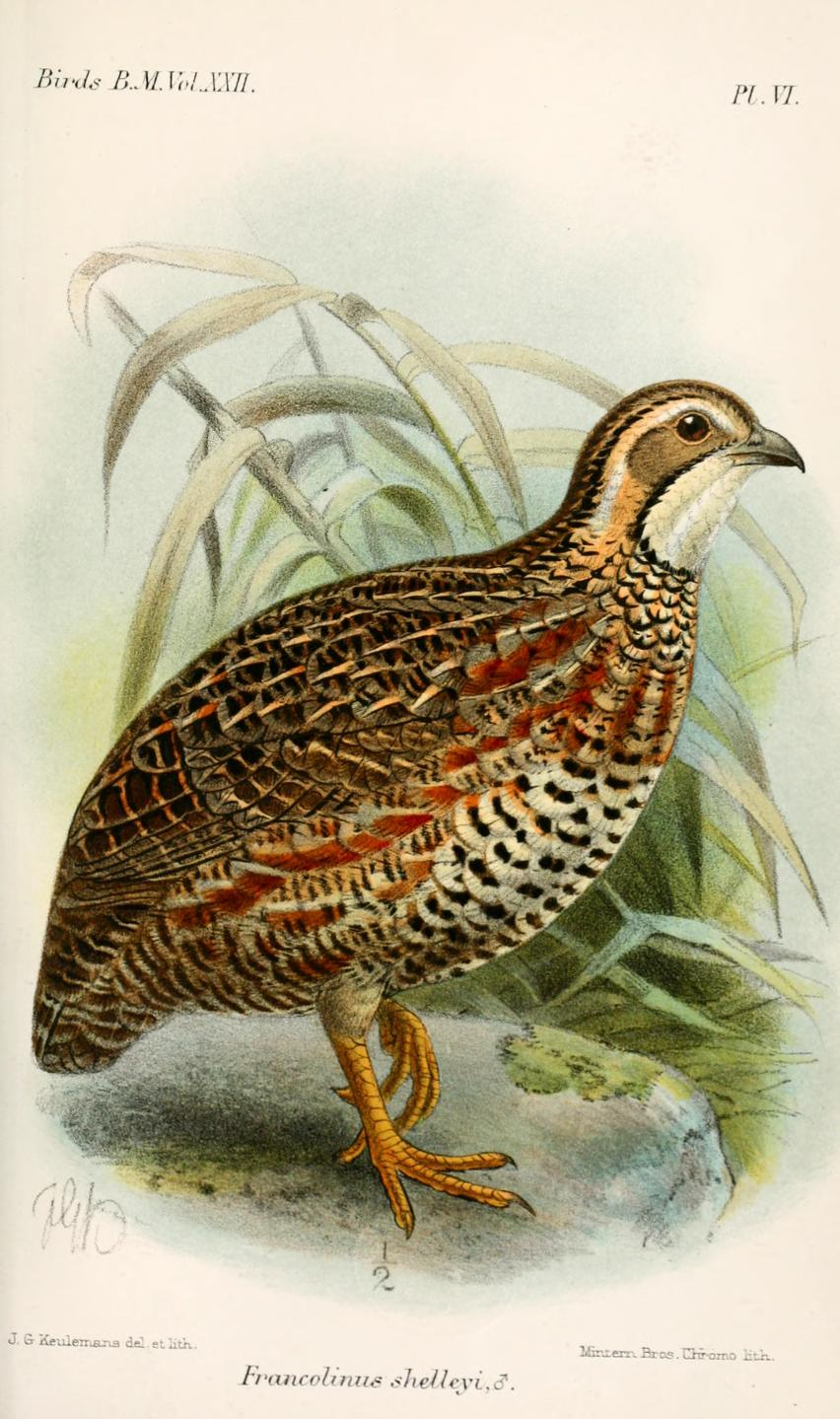
- Illustration by Keulemans, 1893

Conservation status
- Least Concern (IUCN 3.1)

Scientific classification
- Kingdom: Animalia
- Phylum: Chordata
- Class: Aves
- Order: Galliformes
- Family: Phasianidae
- Genus: Scleroptila
- Species: S. shelleyi

Binomial name
- Scleroptila shelleyi (Ogilvie-Grant, 1890)

Synonyms
- Francolinus shelleyi; Francolinus uluensis

= Shelley's francolin =

Species of bird

Shelley's francolin (Scleroptila shelleyi) is a species of bird in the family Phasianidae. The species is named after Sir Edward Shelley, cousin of George Ernest Shelley. IOC 15.1 recognizes the following subspecies:

- S. s. uluensis
- S. s. macarthuri
- S. s. shelleyi

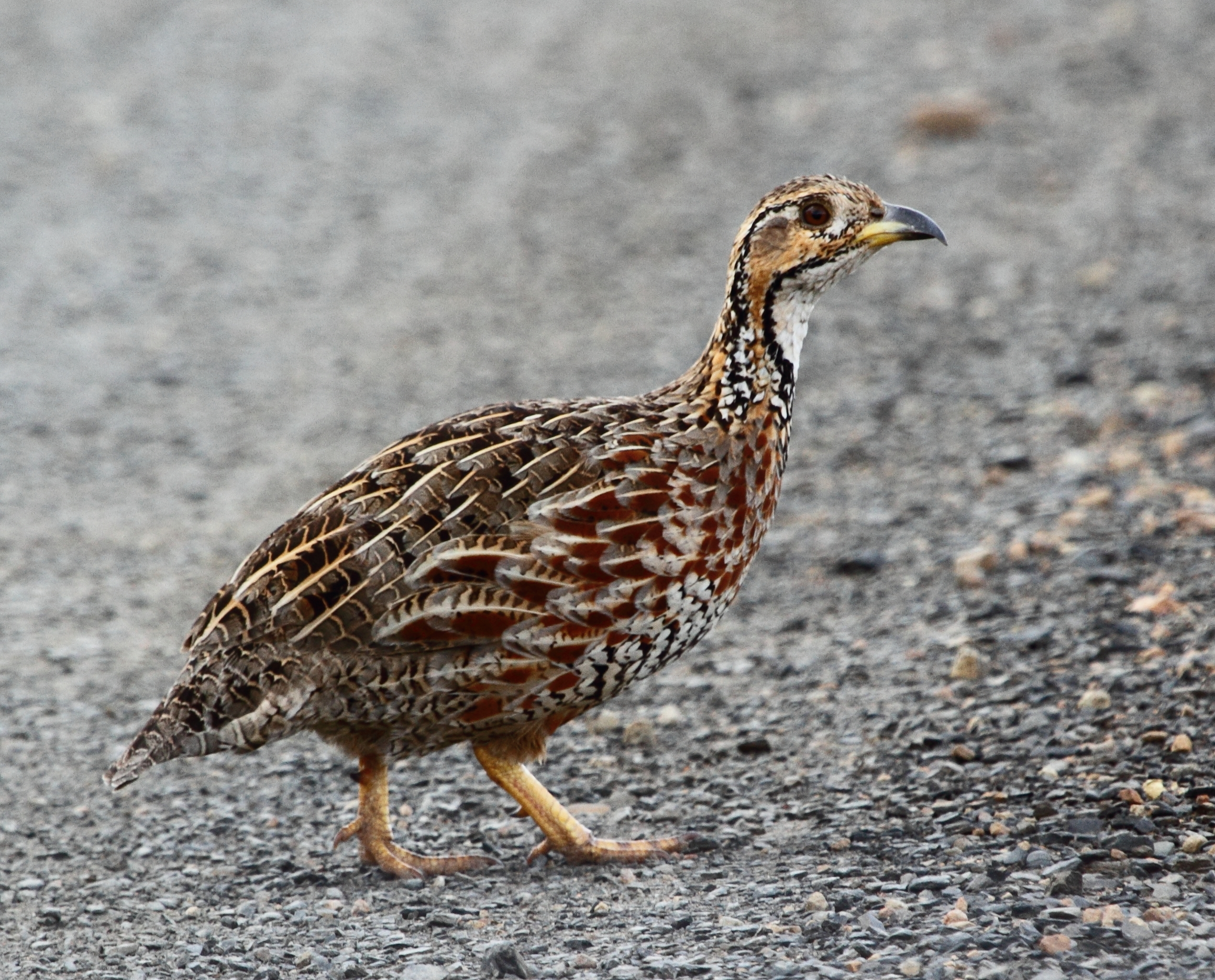
In Ithala Game Reserve

== Distribution and habitat ==
It is found in grassy woodlands and grasslands in Kenya, Mozambique, Rwanda, South Africa, Eswatini, Tanzania, Uganda, and Zimbabwe.
