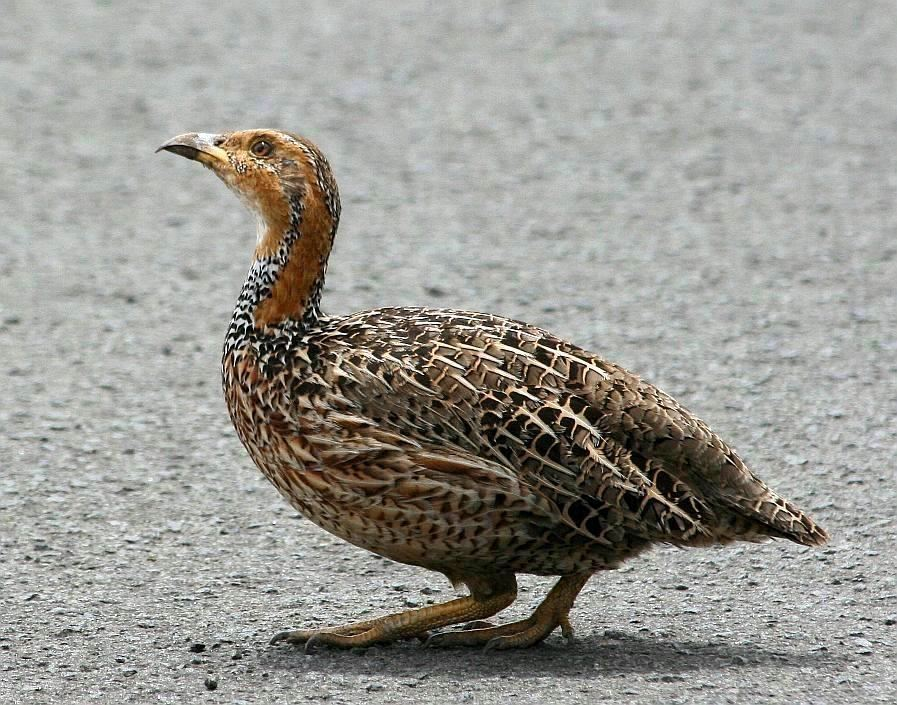

Conservation status
- Least Concern (IUCN 3.1)

Scientific classification
- Kingdom: Animalia
- Phylum: Chordata
- Class: Aves
- Order: Galliformes
- Family: Phasianidae
- Genus: Scleroptila
- Species: S. levaillantii

Binomial name
- Scleroptila levaillantii (Valenciennes, 1825)

Synonyms
- Francolinus levaillantii

= Red-winged francolin =

Species of bird

The red-winged francolin (Scleroptila levaillantii) is a species of bird in the family Phasianidae. It is found in Angola, Burundi, Democratic Republic of the Congo, Kenya, Lesotho, Malawi, Rwanda, South Africa, Eswatini, Tanzania, Uganda, and Zambia.

Elgon francolin (Francolinus elgonensis) may be a hybrid between the red-winged francolin and the moorland francolin.
