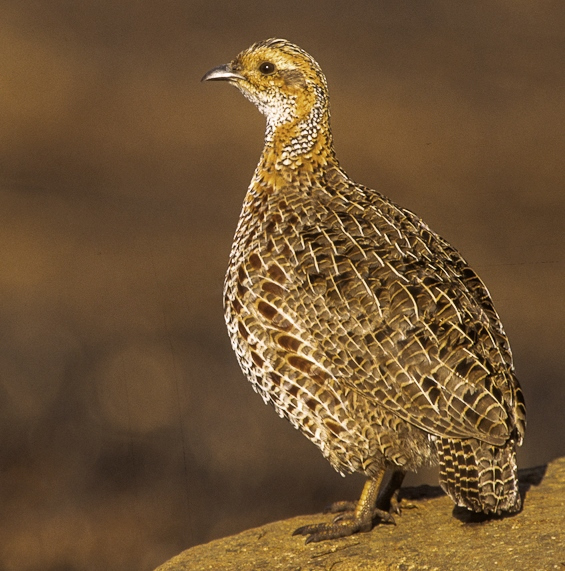

Conservation status
- Least Concern (IUCN 3.1)

Scientific classification
- Kingdom: Animalia
- Phylum: Chordata
- Class: Aves
- Order: Galliformes
- Family: Phasianidae
- Genus: Scleroptila
- Species: S. afra

Binomial name
- Scleroptila afra (Latham, 1790)

Synonyms
- Francolinus africanus Scleroptila africanus

= Grey-winged francolin =

Species of bird

The grey-winged francolin (Scleroptila afra) is a species of bird in the family Phasianidae. It is found in Lesotho and South Africa.
