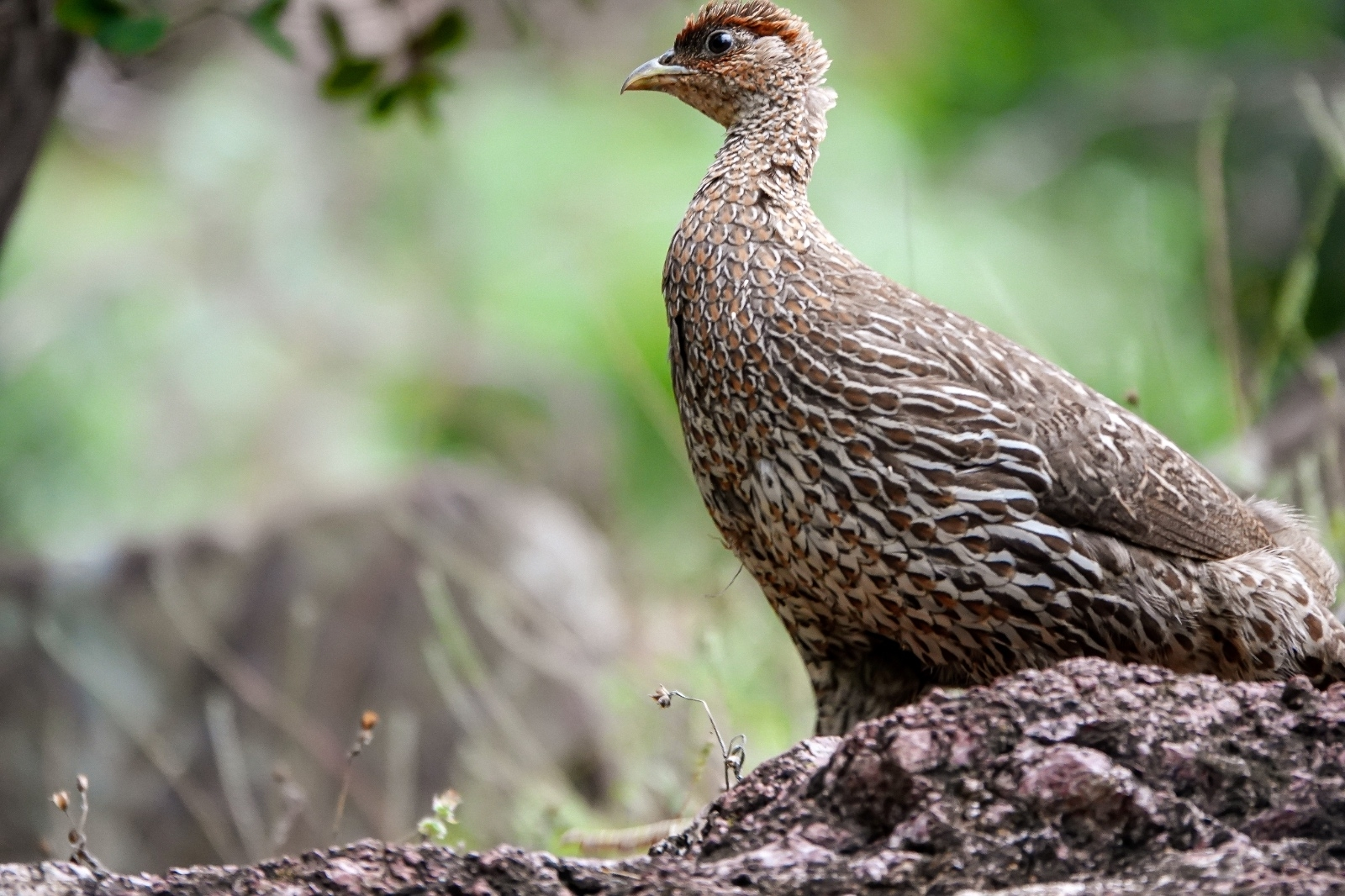

Conservation status
- Critically Endangered (IUCN 3.1)

Scientific classification
- Kingdom: Animalia
- Phylum: Chordata
- Class: Aves
- Order: Galliformes
- Family: Phasianidae
- Genus: Pternistis
- Species: P. ochropectus

Binomial name
- Pternistis ochropectus (Dorst & Jouanin, 1952)
- geographic distribution

Synonyms
- Francolinus ochropectus; Oreocolinus ochropectus

= Djibouti spurfowl =

Species of bird

The Djibouti spurfowl or Djibouti francolin (Pternistis ochropectus) is a bird species in the pheasant family, Phasianidae. It is critically endangered and found only in Djibouti, a nation in the Horn of Africa. This species is grayish-brown overall with white stripes and streaks on its underparts which become finer towards the upperparts. It has black markings on the head and a gray crown and has a short tail. It is 35 cm (1.15 ft) in length, and weighs 940 g (33 oz).

Its natural habitat is high elevation dry forest composed primarily of African juniper. However, the juniper forests preferred by the spurfowl are dying, so it may be found in other habitats, such as box-tree forest. This bird is only known from two locations in Djibouti, one of which is largely unsurveyed. It can be found in small groups and is extremely shy. It is known to feed on berries, seeds, and termites, and it breeds between December and February. It is considered a critically endangered species because it underwent a 90% population decline in twenty years. The degrading of its juniper habitat through man-made disturbances, such as overgrazing, is a major threat to the spurfowl's survival. Ongoing conservation work includes the restoration of some juniper forest, and surveys to obtain accurate population counts and to raise awareness.

== Taxonomy ==
Birds in the family Phasianidae, such as the Djibouti spurfowl, are Old World ground-dwelling gamefowl, many of which are found in forest. African spurfowls are placed in the genus Pternistis. They are terrestrial birds that feed on insects, vegetable matter, and seeds. Most species have a hooked upper beak, tails with fourteen feathers, and in many of them the male has tarsal spurs.

The Djibouti spurfowl was originally collected on February 22, 1952, by Captain Albospeyre, the military commander of Tadjoura in the Forêt du Day. It was then described by French ornithologists Jean Dorst and Christian Jouanin later that year as Francolinus ochropectus in L'Oiseau et la Revue française d'Ornithologie. Its specific epithet is derived from the Ancient Greek ochros, which means "ochre", and the Latin pectus, meaning "breast". The Djibouti spurfowl is now placed in the genus Pternistis that was introduced by the German naturalist Johann Georg Wagler in 1832.

The distinctness of this species has been described as weak by some authors, although its status as a full species has been maintained. It forms a superspecies with Jackson's spurfowl, handsome spurfowl, chestnut-naped spurfowl, and Erckel's spurfowl; A molecular phylogenetic study published in 2019 found that the Djibouti spurfowl was sister to Erckel's spurfowl. The Djibouti spurfowl has no recognized subspecies.

This species has formerly been named as the ochre-breasted francolin, the Tadjoura francolin, and the pale-bellied francolin. To the native people of Djibouti, it is known as the kukaaqe.

== Description ==
This spurfowl is a large, rotund bird of approximately 35 cm (1.15 ft) in length and 940 g (33 oz) in weight. It is grayish-brown overall with white stripes and streaks on its underparts which become finer toward the head. The bird is darker on its back than on its underside. The nape has a hint of rufous, while the top of the head is gray. The forehead, lore, and eye stripe form a black mask, and the chin and throat are whitish. The eyes are brown. The feathers on the body and neck have a gold or straw-colored center that is bordered with dark brown and edged in white. The tail is short. The bill is black with some yellow on the lower mandible, and the Djibouti spurfowl's legs are a greenish-yellow.

The sexes are similar, although the male averages slightly larger than the female and has two prominent spurs on the legs, whereas the female is virtually unspurred. The female also has more rufous in its tail. The juvenile resembles the adults, but is duller, with buff barring, rather than streaking, on the underparts.

The call of this species is a rattling erk erk erk-kkkkkkkk that descends into a chuckling gurgle. Feeding birds may give a low conversational clucking.

No other spurfowl share this bird's restricted range (although the yellow-necked spurfowl occurs elsewhere in Djibouti) so it is unlikely to be confused with any other species.

== Distribution and habitat ==
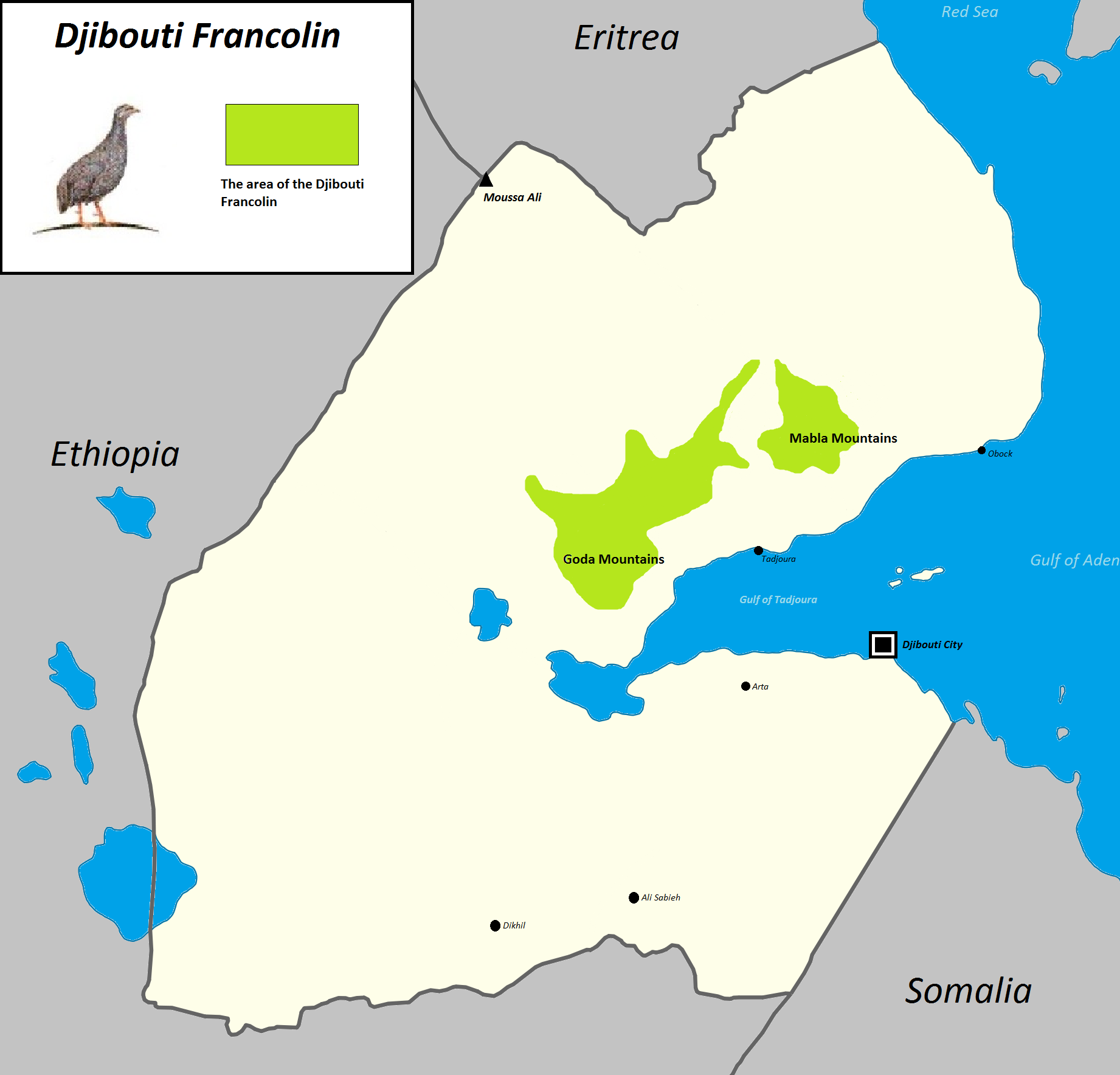
Breeding areas

The Djibouti spurfowl is endemic to Djibouti, a nation in eastern Africa, and is known from only two locations. One is the Forêt du Day in the Goda Mountains, approximately 25 km (16 mi) north of the Gulf of Tadjoura. This site is only 15 km^{2} (3,700 acres) and is undergoing habitat changes. The other site is located in the Mabla Mountains, which are 80 km (50 mi) northeast of the Forêt du Day and remain unsurveyed. This site has been exposed to more human disturbance than the Forêt du Day, and is therefore considered less viable. Combined, the total estimated range of this bird is 58 km^{2} (14,000 acres).

This spurfowl prefers dense African juniper woodland with a closed canopy between 700 and 1,780 m (2,300 and 5,840 ft) in elevation, and preferably on a plateau. Mixed in with this forest habitat are box-trees (Buxus hildebrandtii) and African olives (Olea europaea africana). This spurfowl has been found in secondary woodland, box-tree woodlands (Buxus hildebrandtii), and acacia woodland (Acacia seyal). It is also known to venture into more open woodland and wadis following the breeding season. Much of the bird's African juniper forest habitat has been damaged or destroyed due to human usage; the ability of this dead woodland to support the Djibouti spurfowl remains unknown, although some juveniles have been seen in it. It is believed that the birds are reacting to the destruction of their juniper habitat by trying to find habitat as close to it as possible. It has been noted that due to the decline of the juniper, Buxus hildebrandtii is now the dominant tree in areas most frequently inhabited by the spurfowl.

== Ecology and behavior ==
This species lives in small groups and is very shy, often remaining in dense vegetation to avoid detection, and therefore its ecology is very little studied. It is believed that the spurfowl may migrate from lower altitudes to higher altitudes and juniper forest in the warmer months. Its main predator is the common genet. The bird is most active and most likely to call between 6 am and 9 am. After this it may spend most of the day perched motionless in a tree up to 4 m (13 ft) above the ground. It eats berries, seeds, termites and figs. It scratches the ground to collect seeds and, when it finds an area disturbed by warthogs, also scratches the ground for termites. It is monogamous and breeds between December and February.

Only one nest has been recorded; this was located on a mountain ledge, and was a shallow grass-lined depression in the earth. These birds roost in nearby trees at heights of 5 to 8 m (16 to 26 ft). It is probably monogamous, and local people say that the clutch is typically 7–9 eggs, but this is unconfirmed.

== Conservation ==
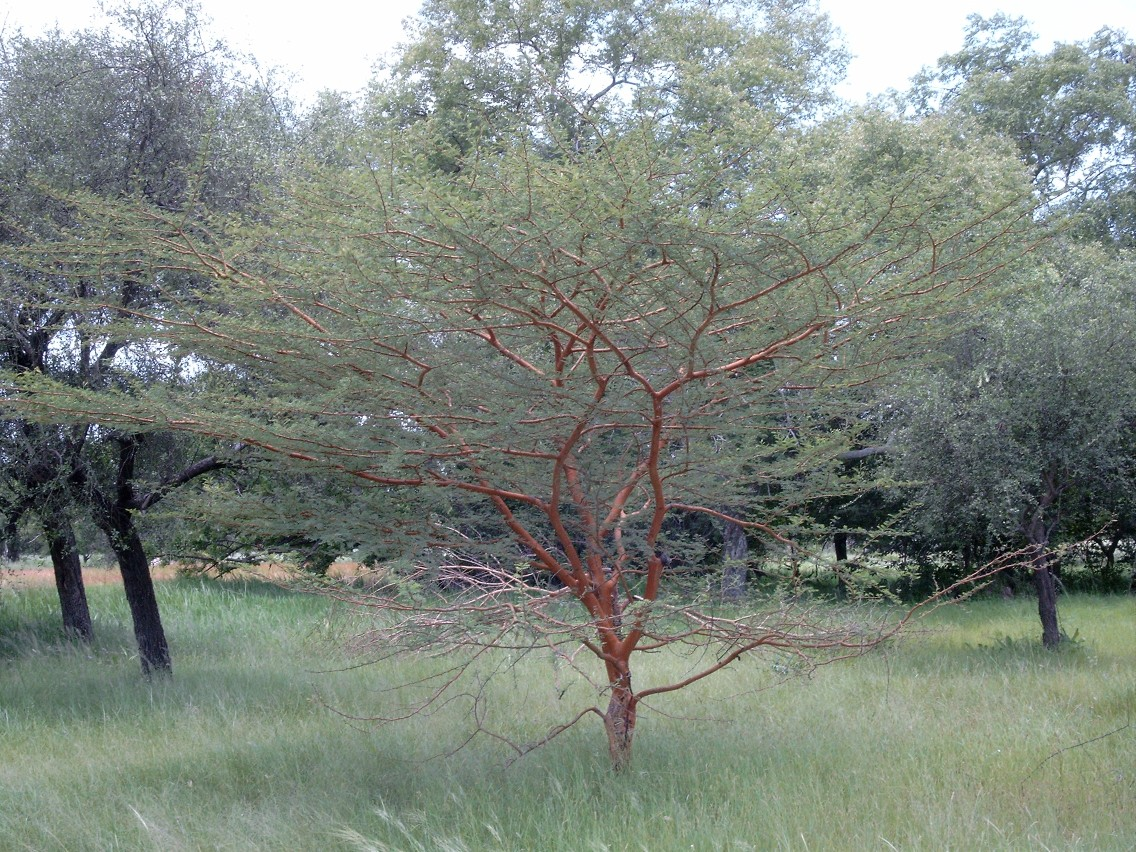
Acacia woodland similar to that in which the Djibouti francolin is occasionally seen

This species is considered critically endangered by the IUCN because it underwent a 90% population decrease over twenty years. In 1977, there were an estimated 5600 birds in Forêt du Day, which was the only known location for the species at the time. By 1986, this number had dropped to 1500 individuals. The species was discovered at its second site in the Mabla Mountains in 1986. While the population in the Mabla Mountains has yet to be surveyed, numbers in the Forêt du Day continued to drop, with 500–1000 Djibouti spurfowls recorded in 1998 and only 115–135 in 2004. The total world population in 2006 was estimated to be between 612 and 723 adults.

This species is threatened because of habitat destruction. At the Forêt du Day site, 95% of its preferred juniper habitat is dead or dying and is unable to support this bird. While an overarching reason behind this destruction remains unknown, overgrazing by cattle, camels, and goats is believed to have been a significant contributor, along with rain, climate change, and a fungal disease. Hunting, the gathering of firewood, egg collecting, and general human disturbance are also believed to be threats. At the Mabla Mountains site, the habitat is also being degraded by the collection of firewood and overgrazing.

In 1937, part of the Forêt du Day site was set aside as Day Forest National Park; this designation is no longer valid. There have been studies of the area and the related environmental and economic issues involved; very few of the suggestions made by these surveys have been implemented, partially due to the unrest in Djibouti since the early 1990s. In May 2008, 1,000 km^{2} (250,000 acres) of forest near the village of Day were set aside for a tree nursery in an attempt to restore some of the spurfowl's damaged habitat. Surveys are under way to determine population sizes and current range, including plans to survey the largely unknown site in the Mabla Mountains and potentially suitable areas in between the two known sites. A promotional campaign in local schools took place in 2008 to raise awareness for the species.

== Relationship with humans ==
The majority of native people in areas surrounding the spurfowl's range believe that the species is important, either because of its meat, which may be eaten by the Muslims who comprise the predominant religious group of the region, or because it is part of the natural heritage of the region. While the species is rarely eaten today due to its rarity, decades ago the species was so common that it was easily captured when it approached nearby villages.

The Djibouti spurfowl has been featured on two stamps: one in 1989 from Djibouti, and another from the French Territory of the Afars and the Issas, which was what Djibouti was known as under French rule, in 1972.

== Other sources ==
- Blot, J (1985). "Contribution to our knowledge of the biology and ecology of the pale-bellied Francolin Francolinus ochropectus Dorst and Jouanin". Alauda. 63(4):244-256.
- Fisher, Zomo S. Y.; Samantha Cartwright, Clive Bealey, Houssein A. Rayaleh, Philip McGowan and E. J. Milner-Gulland (2009). "The Djibouti francolin and juniper forest in Djibouti: the need for both ecosystem and species-specific conservation". Oryx 43:542-551 doi:10.1017/S0030605309990214
