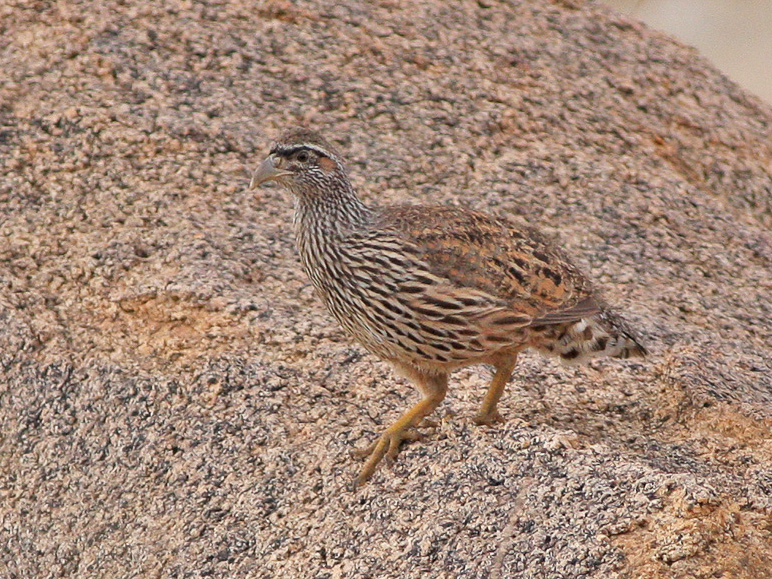
- Male

Conservation status
- Least Concern (IUCN 3.1)

Scientific classification
- Kingdom: Animalia
- Phylum: Chordata
- Class: Aves
- Order: Galliformes
- Family: Phasianidae
- Genus: Pternistis
- Species: P. hartlaubi

Binomial name
- Pternistis hartlaubi (Barbosa du Bocage, 1869)
- geographic distribution

Synonyms
- Francolinus hartlaubi

= Hartlaub's spurfowl =

Species of bird

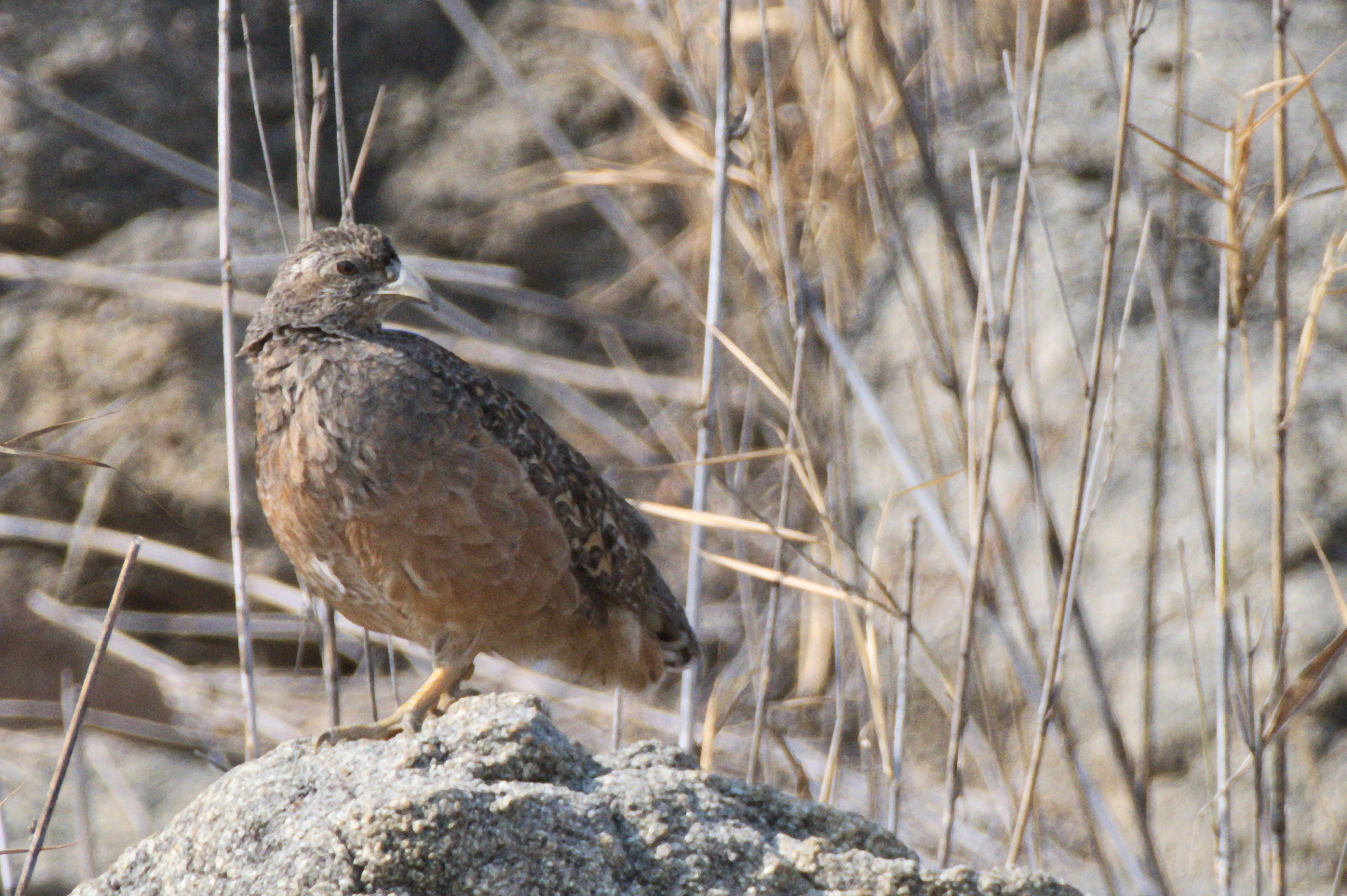
Hartlaub's Spurfowl

Hartlaub's spurfowl or Hartlaub's francolin (Pternistis hartlaubi) is a species of bird in the pheasant family Phasianidae. It is endemic to the escarpment zone of Namibia and Angola. The common name and Latin binomial commemorate the German physician and ornithologist Gustav Hartlaub.

== Taxonomy ==
Hartlaub's spurfowl was described in 1869 by the Portuguese naturalist José Vicente Barbosa du Bocage from a specimen collected in Huíla Province, Angola. He coined the binomial name Francolinus hartlaubi. The species is now placed in the genus Pternistis that was introduced by the German naturalist Johann Georg Wagler in 1832. The specific epithet hartlaubi was chosen to honour the German physician and ornithologist Gustav Hartlaub. A molecular phylogenetic study published in 2019 found that Hartlaub's spurfowl was basal to the other species in the genus. Hartlaub's spurfowl is considered as monotypic: the subspecies ovambensis, bradfieldi and crypticus have been described but are not recognised.

== Description ==
Hartlaub's Spurfowl is the smallest African spurfowl and is highly sexually dimorphic both in plumage and in size. The male is on averages 28 cm (11 in) in length and weighs 245–290 g (8.6–10.2 oz); the smaller female is around 25 cm (9.8 in) in length and weighs 210–240 g (7.4–8.5 oz). The male has a dark brownish forehead, a prominent white eyestripe and rufous ear coverts. The upperparts are brown-grey with darker bars and streaks. The underparts are pale grey with extensive dark streaks. The upper mandible is brownish and the lower mandible is yellow. The legs are yellow with flattened spurs. The female has upperparts that are similar to those of the male. The underparts, head, neck are a dull rufous without the brown streaking. Both sexes have disproportionately large bills. The juvenile male is similar to the adult male but has finer streaking on the upperparts. The young female is similar to an adult.

== Distribution and habitat ==
Hartlaub's spurfowl is endemic to southwest Africa, occurring only in northcentral to northwestern Namibia and a small area of southwestern Angola.

Hartlaub's spurfowl is an inhabitant of medium-altitude arid and semiarid regions from 800–1,600 m (2,600–5,200 ft). Throughout its range, its preferred habitat consists of higher ground, mostly on rocky granite and sandstone outcrops (koppies to locals), surrounded by semidesert steppe. Invariably, relatively dense grass and shrubbery are associated with these outcrops.

The red-billed spurfowl (Pternistis adspersus) and the Orange River francolin (Scleroptila gutturalis) occur alongside this species, but they occupy different habitats. Red-billed spurfowls prefer bush along watercourses and Orange River francolins can be found on the slopes leading up to the rocky outcrops occupied by Hartlaub's spurfowl.

== Behaviour and ecology ==
=== Breeding ===
Hartlaub's spurfowls appear to be perennially territorial, with variable numbers of boundary call sites demarking each territory. Call-sites are used by territorial pairs on a regular basis, for daily bouts of antiphonal duets. The frequency of use of particular call-sites appears to be influenced more by the presence (vocalizations) of un-mated females on particular boundaries, than by the daily duetting of neighbouring pairs. The mean territory size of Hartlaub's francolin pairs is 40863.9±12016.1 square metres (n = 12 pairs). Dependent on annual breeding success and offspring survival, the mean population density of the study area during 1983 through 1989 ranged from one bird in 0.82 ha to one bird in 2.04 ha, with an average annual population density of one bird in 1.43 ha. There was no significant difference in outer convex polygon areas determined by call sites and radio-telemetry. However, core ranges and utilization distributions of pairs, and, in particular, the multiple nuclei of different daily activities could only be distinguished by radio-telemetry. The 90% multiple nuclei of seasonal distribution are correlated with patchy distribution of food resources favoured by females, and, whilst rearing young, the distribution of insects, and especially cryptic termites.

Antiphonal duets of territorial pairs are audibly distinguishable, on the basis of temporal and structural differences in the female vocal elements of duets. Territorial pairs use antiphonal duets on a daily basis to advertise their presence, and such calling was most frequent shortly after sunrise. Un-mated females call far more frequently than territorial pairs, often throughout the day, with peaks at shortly after sunrise and before sunset. Playback experiments with the advertising calls of un-mated females within territory boundaries of established pairs, elicited vigorous vocal and behavioural responses from territorial females. Male calls are more conservative than female calls, with females using a wider repertoire of vocalizations.

The mating system of Hartlaub's spurfowl can be described as a female dominated resource defence monogamy. Perennial territorial resources (food, traditional call-sites, refuge and suitable nest-sites) are primarily defended by female Hartlaub's francolins. By excluding other females from the vicinity of the resource, the defending female can count on male visitation, life-mating and thus biased mating access with guaranteed fertilization. The pair bond is maintained by ritualised behaviours, including pair-distinct (female initiated) antiphonal duetting and reverse mounting during courtship and incubation. Operational sex ratios are "female skewed" and probably strongly influenced by predation, with noticeably large numbers of strongly- vocal female 'floaters' and a virtual absence of un-mated males. It is unusual that this sex-role reversed monogamy occurs in a species which is strongly sexually dichromatic and dimorphic, with the males more brightly coloured and somewhat larger than females.

=== Food and feeding ===
Habitat use, foraging behavior, and diet of male and female Hartlaub's spurfowl are related to the availability of corms, seed, and insects of different sizes in different habitats. They primarily forage on granitic outcrops, and use a variety of feeding techniques, with significant sexual differences in foraging behavior, and to a lesser degree, dietary composition.

Males consume a greater diversity of food items than females, although considerable dietary overlap occurs between the sexes, and sexual differences in feeding techniques result in some food items being prioritized by each sex. In particular, distinct functional differences results from females' almost exclusive digging habits, in contrast to males' wider range of foraging techniques, including an apparently male-specific foraging technique of exposing cryptic termites.

The relatively larger-billed females specializes on digging out the corms of Cyperus spp., which within the species, appears to be primarily carried out by females, with males spending proportionally more time foraging for a more diverse diet of insects and seed. This sexual difference in diet is thought to be adaptive, in response to predator and sexual selection pressures. The relatively narrow dietary spectrum of females may be a causative factor in vigorous perennial defence of territorial resources.

Hartlaub's spurfowl occur in pairs or small family parties up to four, and are inconspicuous unless calling. They are not easily flushed, preferring to hide between boulders. Flushed birds utter a rapid, chattering 'krak', flying rapidly.

== Status ==
Hartlaub's spurfowl is not especially common throughout its limited range. The Namibian population is estimated at c. 26 000 birds. However, its conservation status is not threatened, probably because its habitat is of little commercial value to humans at this stage. Granite mining activities are a potential threat to their habitat. Though spurfowls are gamebirds, Hartlaub's is too small to be of any special culinary value.
