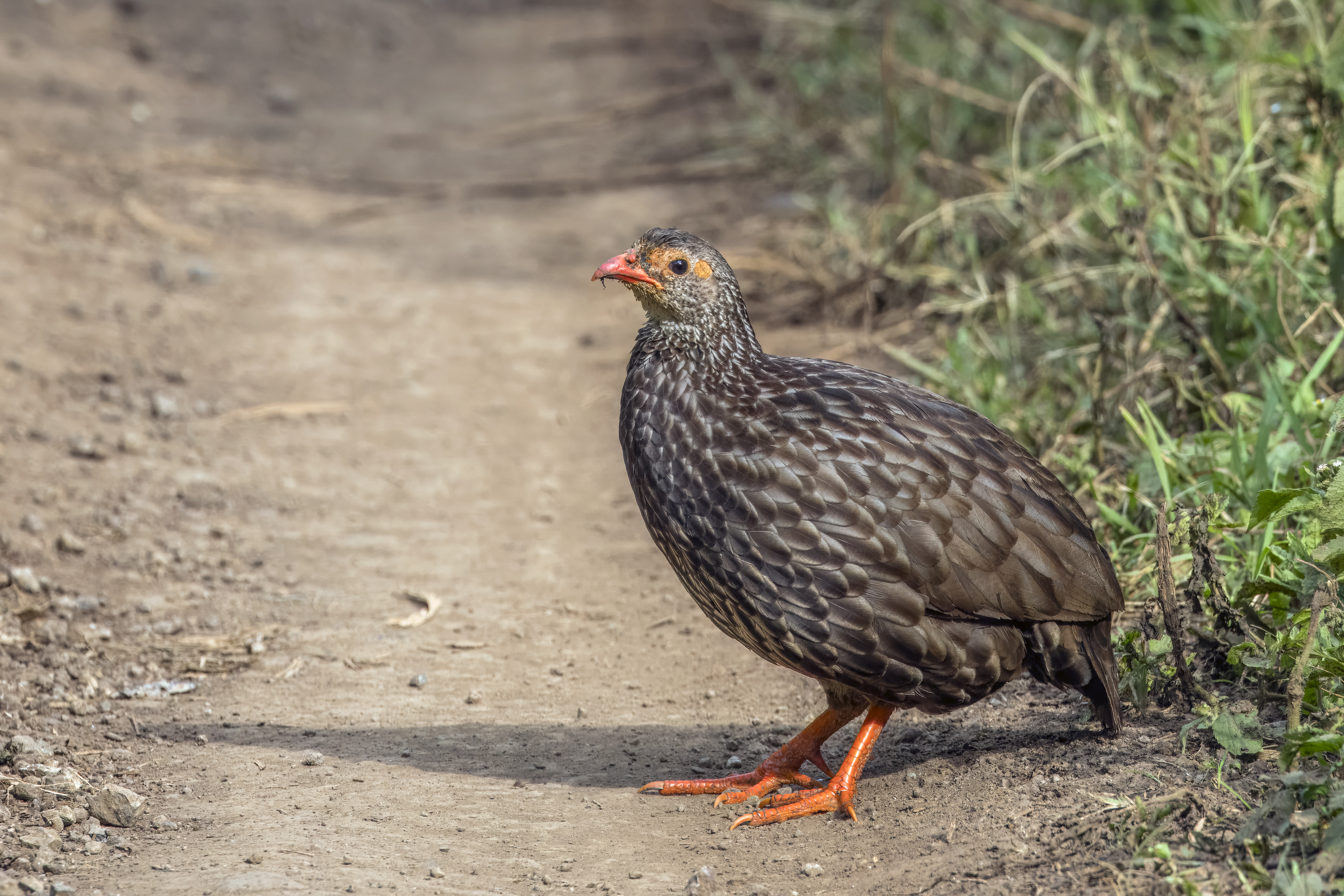
- P. s. maranensis Arusha National Park, Tanzania

Conservation status
- Least Concern (IUCN 3.1)

Scientific classification
- Kingdom: Animalia
- Phylum: Chordata
- Class: Aves
- Order: Galliformes
- Family: Phasianidae
- Genus: Pternistis
- Species: P. squamatus

Binomial name
- Pternistis squamatus (Cassin, 1857)
- geographic distribution

Synonyms
- Francolinus squamatus

= Scaly spurfowl =

Species of bird

The scaly spurfowl (Pternistis squamatus) is a species of bird in the family Phasianidae. It is found in Angola, Burundi, Cameroon, Central African Republic, Republic of the Congo, Democratic Republic of the Congo, Equatorial Guinea, Ethiopia, Gabon, Kenya, Malawi, Nigeria, Rwanda, São Tomé and Príncipe, Sudan, Tanzania, and Uganda.

== Taxonomy ==
The scaly spurfowl was formally described in 1857 by the American ornithologist John Cassin from specimens collected by Paul Du Chaillu in the Cape Lopez region in what is now the West Africa state of Gabon. Cassin coined the binomial name Francolinus squamatus. The specific epithet squamatus is Latin for "scaled". The species is now placed in the genus Pternistis that was introduced by the German naturalist Johann Georg Wagler in 1832. A phylogenetic study published in 2019 found that the scaly spurfowl is a sister species to the Ahanta spurfowl.

Three subspecies are now recognised:

- Pternistis squamatus squamatus (Cassin, 1857) — southeast Nigeria to north and east Democratic Republic of the Congo (DR Congo), Gabon and the Republic of the Congo (R Congo)
- Pternistis squamatus schuetti (Cabanis, 1880) — east R Congo to Uganda, central and southwest Kenya, and central Ethiopia. Also northeast and southeast Tanzania and north Malawi (Vipya Plateau) (Note: Mandiwana-Neudani et al. (2019) treat P. s. schuetti as a full species, Schuett's spurfowl.)
- Pternistis squamatus maranensis (Mearns, 1910) — southeast Kenya, northeast Tanzania
