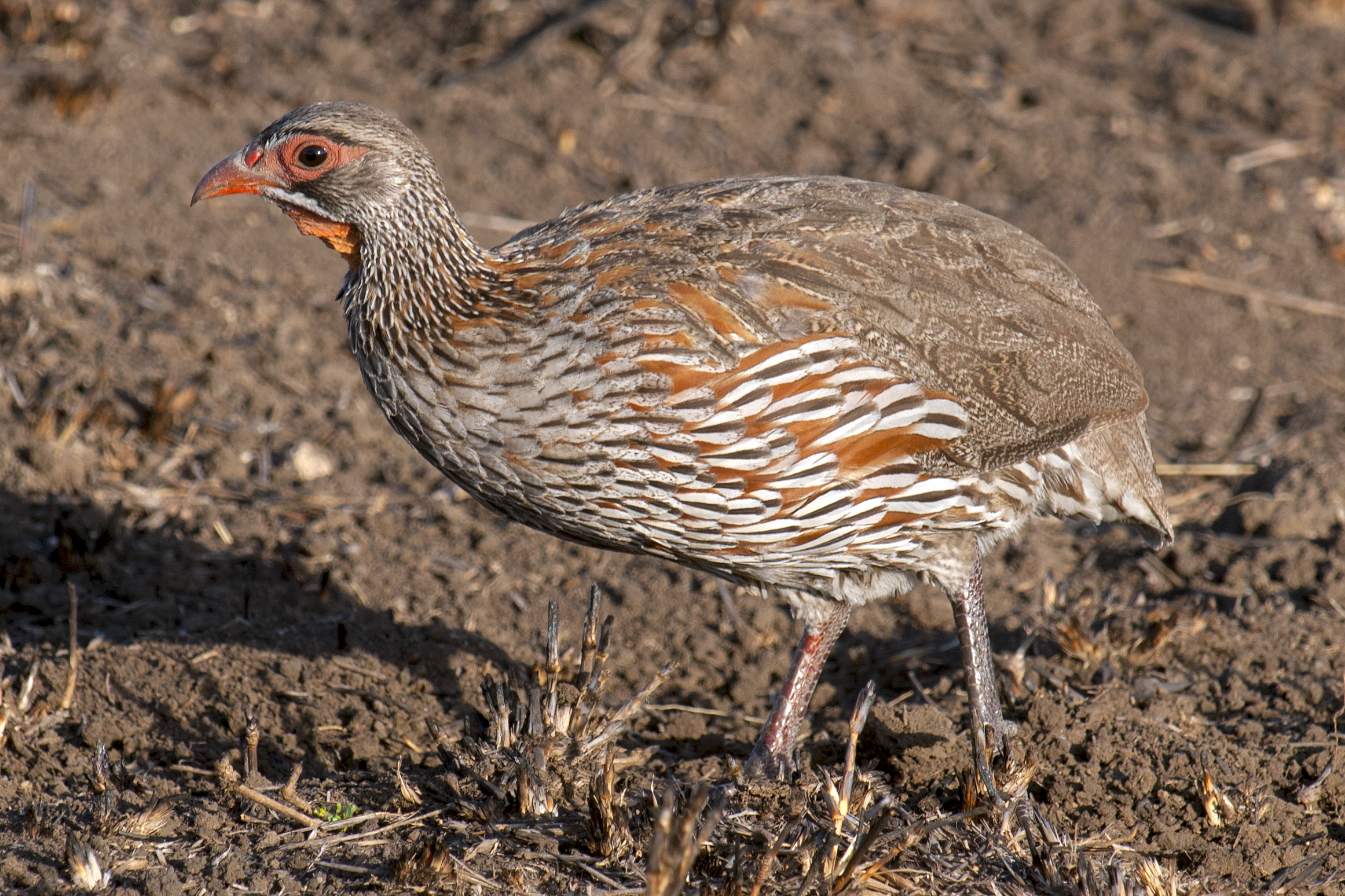
- Grey-breasted spurfowl in Serengeti National Park.

Scientific classification
- Kingdom: Animalia
- Phylum: Chordata
- Class: Aves
- Order: Galliformes
- Family: Phasianidae
- Tribe: Coturnicini
- Genus: Pternistis; Wagler, 1832

Type species
- Tetrao capensis = Tetrao afer Gmelin, 1788

Species
- See text

Synonyms
- Francolinus

= Pternistis =

Genus of birds

Pternistis is a genus of galliform birds formerly classified in the spurfowl group of the partridge subfamily of the pheasant family. They are described as "partridge-francolins" in literature establishing their phylogenetic placement outside the monophyletic assemblage of true spurfowls. All species are endemic to Sub-Saharan Africa, excepted the double-spurred spurfowl (also present in Morocco). They are commonly known as spurfowls or francolins, but are closely related to jungle bush quail, Alectoris rock partridges, and Coturnix quail. The species are strictly monogamous, remaining mated indefinitely. They procure most of their food by digging. Spurfowls subsist almost entirely on roots, beans of leguminous shrubs and trees, tubers, and seeds, and feasting opportunistically on termites, ants, locusts, flowers, and fruit. Important predators are jackals, caracals, servals, and birds of prey, as well as herons and marabou storks.

Harsh, grating calls typical of Pternistis species: P. swainsonii and P. adspersus

== Taxonomy ==
The genus Pternistis was introduced by the German naturalist Johann Georg Wagler in 1832. The name is from the Ancient Greek pternistēs meaning "one who strikes with the heel". The type species was designated by the English zoologist George Robert Gray in 1841 as the Cape spurfowl (Pternistis capensis).

Most of the species within the genus formerly included "francolin" in their common name. Beginning in 2004 various ornithologists have recommended that it would be clearer to restrict the use of "francolin" to members of the genus Francolinus and closely related genera (Peliperdix, Ortygornis, Campocolinus, Scleroptila) and to use "spurfowl" for all members of the genus Pternistis. Both are in different tribes within the subfamily Pavoninae: Pternistis is placed with the Old World quails in the tribe Coturnicini, while the true francolins are placed with the junglefowl in the tribe Gallini. This recommendation was adopted in 2020 by Frank Gill and colleagues in the online list of world birds that they maintain on behalf of the International Ornithological Committee (IOC). The common name "spurfowl" is also used for the three Asian species that are placed in the genus Galloperdix.

== Species ==
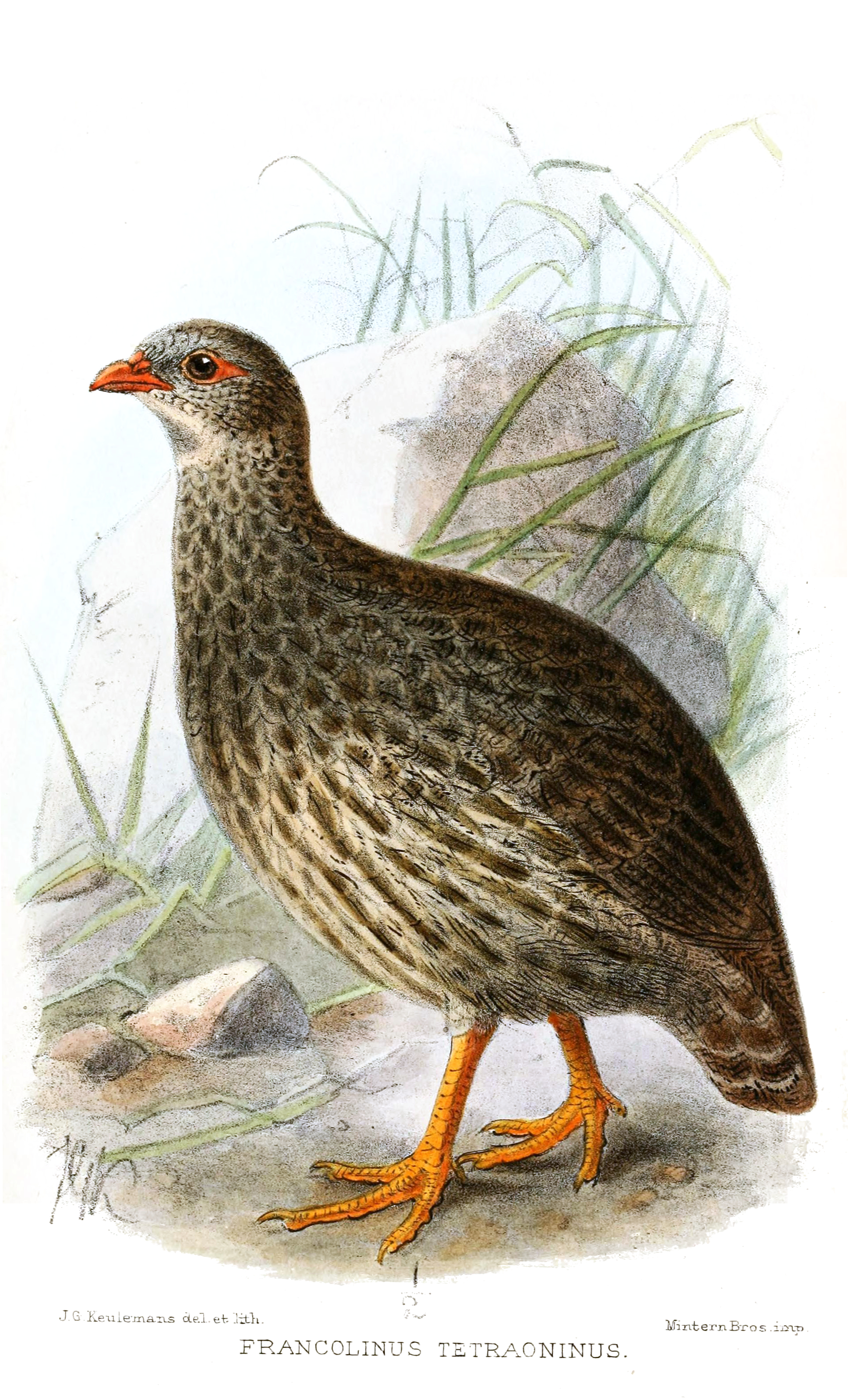
Depiction of Scaly spurfowl (Pternistis squamatus).

- - Hartlaub's spurfowl
  - - - Mount Cameroon spurfowl
      - Handsome spurfowl
    - - - Swierstra's spurfowl
        - - - - Erckel's spurfowl
              - Djibouti spurfowl
            - Chestnut-naped spurfowl
            - Black-fronted spurfowl (Note: Mandiwana-Neudani et al (2019) did not sample DNA from the black-fronted spurfowl (Pternistis atrifrons) but suggested the taxon should be considered as a subspecies of the chestnut-naped spurfowl (Pternistis castaneicollis). In contrast, Töpfer et al (2015) sampled mitochondrial DNA from the black-fronted spurfowl and concluded the taxon should be treated as a distinct species.)
          - - Jackson's spurfowl
            - - - - - Scaly spurfowl (Note: Mandiwana-Neudani et al. (2019) split the scaly spurfowl and elevate Schuett's spurfowl (Pternistis squamatus schuetti) to a full species.)
                    - Ahanta spurfowl
                  - - Grey-striped spurfowl
                    - - - Hildebrandt's spurfowl
                        - Natal spurfowl
                      - - Red-billed spurfowl
                        - Cape spurfowl
              - - - Heuglin's spurfowl
                  - Double-spurred spurfowl
                - - - Harwood's spurfowl
                    - Clapperton's spurfowl
                  - - Yellow-necked spurfowl
                    - - Swainson's spurfowl
                      - - Grey-breasted spurfowl
                        - Red-necked spurfowl (Note: Mandiwana-Neudani et al. (2019) split the red-necked spurfowl and elevate Cranch’s spurfowl (Pternistis afer cranchii) to a full species.)

Phylogenetic tree based on a study published in 2019.

The genus contains 23 species:

- Hartlaub's spurfowl, Pternistis hartlaubi (Barboza du Bocage, 1869)
- Mount Cameroon spurfowl, Pternistis camerunensis (Alexander, 1909)
- Handsome spurfowl, Pternistis nobilis (Reichenow, 1908)
- Chestnut-naped spurfowl, Pternistis castaneicollis (Salvadori, 1888)
- Erckel's spurfowl, Pternistis erckelii (Rüppell, 1835)
- Djibouti spurfowl, Pternistis ochropectus (Dorst & Jouanin, 1952)
- Swierstra's spurfowl, Pternistis swierstrai (Roberts, 1929)
- Ahanta spurfowl, Pternistis ahantensis (Temminck, 1854)
- Grey-striped spurfowl, Pternistis griseostriatus (Ogilvie-Grant, 1890)
- Jackson's spurfowl, Pternistis jacksoni (Ogilvie-Grant, 1891)
- Red-billed spurfowl, Pternistis adspersus (Waterhouse, 1838)
- Cape spurfowl, Pternistis capensis (Gmelin, JF, 1789)
- Natal spurfowl, Pternistis natalensis (Smith, A, 1833)
- Hildebrandt's spurfowl, Pternistis hildebrandti (Cabanis, 1878)
- Double-spurred spurfowl, Pternistis bicalcaratus (Linnaeus, 1766)
- Scaly spurfowl, Pternistis squamatus (Cassin, 1857)
- Heuglin's spurfowl, Pternistis icterorhynchus (Heuglin, 1863)
- Clapperton's spurfowl, Pternistis clappertoni (Children & Vigors, 1826)
- Harwood's spurfowl, Pternistis harwoodi (Blundell & Lovat, 1899)
- Swainson's spurfowl, Pternistis swainsonii (Smith, A, 1836)
- Yellow-necked spurfowl, Pternistis leucoscepus (Gray, GR, 1867)
- Grey-breasted spurfowl, Pternistis rufopictus Reichenow, 1887
- Red-necked spurfowl, Pternistis afer (Müller, PLS, 1776)
