= Harwood's spurfowl =

Conservation status
- Near Threatened (IUCN 3.1)

Scientific classification
- Kingdom: Animalia
- Phylum: Chordata
- Class: Aves
- Order: Galliformes
- Family: Phasianidae
- Genus: Pternistis
- Species: P. harwoodi

Binomial name
- Pternistis harwoodi (Blundell & Lovat, 1899)
- geographic distribution

Synonyms
- Francolinus harwoodi

Species of bird

Harwood's spurfowl (Pternistis harwoodi), also known as Harwood's Francolin, is a species of bird in the family Phasianidae. It is a grey-brown bird with red bill and tail, and red bare skin around the eyes. Both sexes have similar coloring, although the female is paler in color with a more extensive buff belly.

This spurfowl is endemic to Ethiopia, having a range restricted to the Ethiopian Highlands on either side of the Blue Nile River between Lake Tana and its confluence with the Jamma River, as well as its tributaries between these points. Originally thought to inhabit Typha beds growing along small, shallow watercourses and acacia thickets, studies in 1996 found Harwood's spurfowl in a site with neither of these. It is threatened by habitat loss as population pressures force locals into the marginal scrublands favored by the bird as its habitat. Harwood's spurfowl is heavily hunted for food and is sometimes also caught for sale at local markets; its eggs are also a food source.

== Taxonomy ==
Harwood's spurfowl was described in 1899 by the English ornithologists Herbert Weld Blundell and Simon Fraser, 14th Lord Lovat from a specimen that they had collected in the Aheafeg area of Ethiopia. They coined the binomial name Francolinus harwoodi. The specific epithet was chosen to honour the taxidermist and naturalist Leonard Harwood (fl. 1899). The species is now placed in the genus Pternistis that was introduced by the German naturalist Johann Georg Wagler in 1832. A molecular phylogenetic study published in 2019 found that Harwood's spurfowl is sister to Clapperton's spurfowl. Harwood's spurfowl is considered to be monotypic: no subspecies are recognised.
