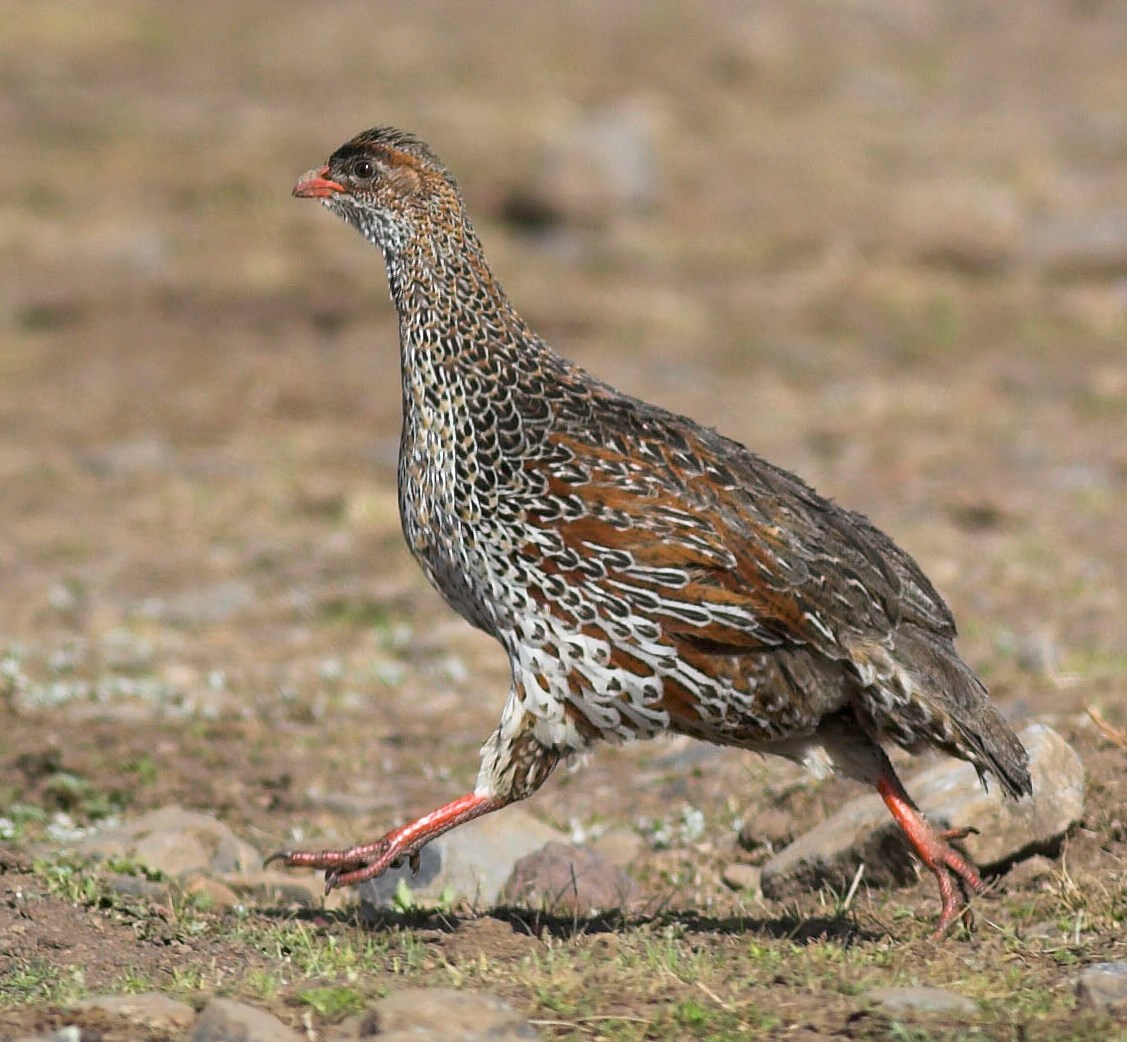

Conservation status
- Least Concern (IUCN 3.1)

Scientific classification
- Kingdom: Animalia
- Phylum: Chordata
- Class: Aves
- Order: Galliformes
- Family: Phasianidae
- Genus: Pternistis
- Species: P. castaneicollis

Binomial name
- Pternistis castaneicollis (Salvadori, 1888)
- geographic distribution

Synonyms
- Francolinus castaneicollis protonym

= Chestnut-naped spurfowl =

Species of bird

The chestnut-naped spurfowl (Pternistis castaneicollis) is a species of bird in the pheasant family Phasianidae. At 33–37 cm (13–15 in) in length and weighing 550–1,200 g (19–42 oz), it is a large species of spurfowl. It is found in Ethiopia and Somaliland. The population is believed to be stable but according to the International Union for Conservation of Nature (IUCN) there is insufficient data to make an estimate of the population.

== Taxonomy ==
The chestnut-naped spurfowl was described in 1888 by the Italian zoologist Tommaso Salvadori based on a specimen collected near "Lago Ciar-Ciar" (now Haro Ch'erch'er Hayk') in the Ahmar Mountains of central Ethiopia. He coined the binomial name Francolinus castaneicollis. (Note: The volume of the Annali del Museo Civico di Storia Naturale di Genova has 1888 on the title page but Salvadori states in the article that the specimen was collected in Ethiopia on 22 December 1888. Thus either the year in the article is incorrect or the volume was published after 1888.) The species is now placed in the genus Pternistis that was introduced by the German naturalist Johann Georg Wagler in 1832. The specific epithet castaneicollis combines the Latin castaneus meaning "chestnut-brown" and the Modern Latin -collis meaning "necked".

Some taxonomies (eBird/Clements; IOC) list the black-fronted spurfowl as a subspecies (P. c. atrifrons). Others, such as the IUCN, currently maintain the black-fronted spurfowl as a separate species (Pternis atrifrons).
