= Christian Jouanin =

French ornithologist (1925–2014)

- Born: 1925
- Died: 8 November 2014 (aged 88–89); Saint Cloud
- Scientific career
- Fields: Ornithology
- Institutions: Muséum national d'histoire naturelle

Christian Jouanin (French pronunciation: [kʁistjɑ̃ ʒwanɛ̃]; 1925 – 8 November 2014) was a prominent French ornithologist and expert on petrels. He worked for the Muséum national d'histoire naturelle in Paris and is a former Vice President of the International Union for Conservation of Nature. He has done many major projects in the field, notably with petrels in the Indian Ocean and Madeiras, and has described a number of species.

Jouanin began working professionally with birds in 1940 at the age of 15, when he started working for the Muséum national d'histoire naturelle under the tutelage of Jacques Berlioz, then the head of the ornithology department. At the age of 22 he married his wife, Nicole, with whom he has had two daughters. While working at the museum he, along with his colleague Jean Dorst, who later replaced Berlioz as the head of the ornithology department, helped write the species description for the Djibouti spurfowl, a critically endangered spurfowl endemic to Djibouti whose type specimen was brought to the museum. He also developed a lifelong interest in two distinctly different bird families, the hummingbirds and the petrels.

Djibouti spurfowl, a bird described by Jouanin

In 1955 Jouanin published his first independent species description after realizing that the new species, named Jouanin's petrel, differed significantly from the Mascarene petrel. This description began a long period of his life dedicated to the research of petrels in the Indian Ocean. While his primary goal was to find the breeding grounds of the Mascarene petrel, he discovered another new species, Barau's petrel, breeding on the island of Réunion. He also analyzed the differences between the Réunion and Seychelles populations of tropical shearwater.

In 1963 he switched his focus to the Atlantic Ocean, participating with Francis Roux in an expedition to the Savage Islands. He then proceeded to study Cory's shearwater in the Madeiras with Alec Zino, a collaboration that has resulted in over eighty publications.

Jouanin is recognized as an expert on the Order Procellariiformes and co-wrote the section on those birds in James Lee Peters's Check-list of Birds of the World. He served as the Vice President of the International Union for Conservation of Nature from 1970 to 1975 and has been a member of the International Ornithological Congress since 1954, serving on the Permanent Executive Committee from 1970 to 1978.

He organized the exhibition ″L'Impératice Joséphine et les Sciences Naturelles″ presented at the National Museum of Château de Malmaison and Bois-Préau in Paris Rueil-Malmaison: 26 May - 6 October 1997.
