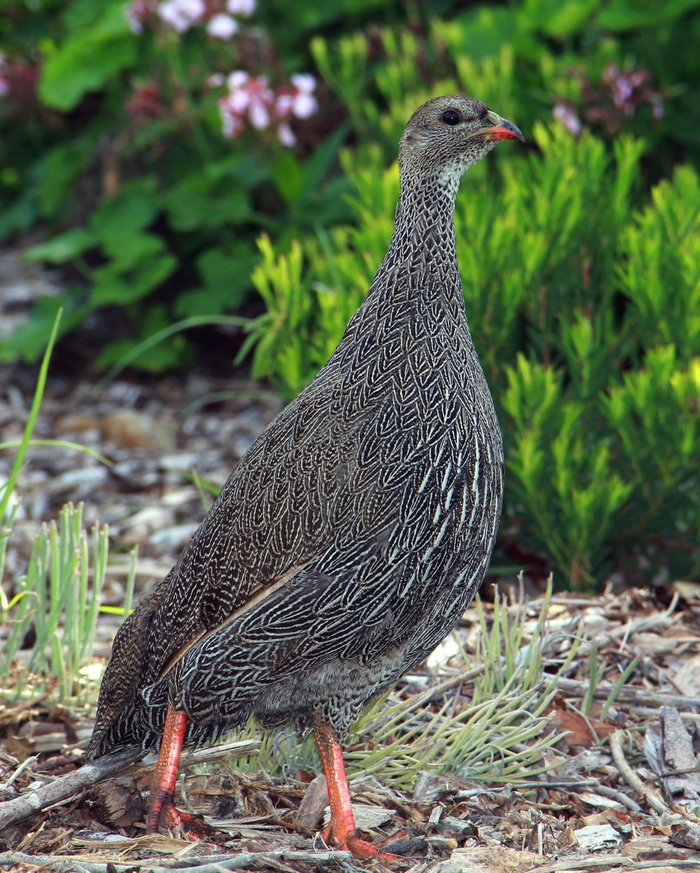
- Adult female (no leg spurs) at Kirstenbosch Botanical Garden

Conservation status
- Least Concern (IUCN 3.1)

Scientific classification
- Kingdom: Animalia
- Phylum: Chordata
- Class: Aves
- Order: Galliformes
- Family: Phasianidae
- Genus: Pternistis
- Species: P. capensis

Binomial name
- Pternistis capensis (Gmelin, JF, 1789)
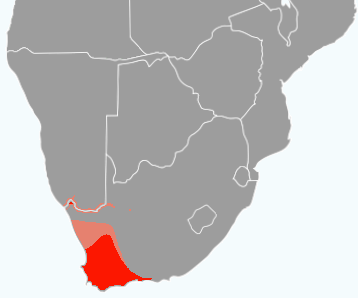
- range strongholds lower density or localized

Synonyms
- Francolinus capensis

= Cape spurfowl =

Species of bird

The Cape spurfowl or Cape francolin (Pternistis capensis) is a gamebird in the pheasant family Phasianidae. It is endemic to southern Africa, where it is the largest francolin. It occurs in the Western Cape province of South Africa, and locally northwards to southern Namibia. It has adapted to alien vegetation and a variety of human-altered habitats, but scrubby roosting and nesting space is a prerequisite. The species is not threatened.

== Taxonomy ==
The English ornithologist John Latham described the Cape spurfowl in his A General Synopsis of Birds in 1783. He used the English name "Cape partridge", but did not introduce a Latin name. Six years later in 1789, when the German naturalist Johann Friedrich Gmelin updated Carl Linnaeus's Systema Naturae, he included a terse description of the Cape spurfowl, coined the binomial name Tetrao capensis and cited Latham's work. The specific epithet capensis is the Latin for the Cape of Good Hope. The species is now placed in the genus Pternistis that was introduced by the German naturalist Johann Georg Wagler in 1832. The Cape spurfowl is considered as monotypic: no subspecies are recognised. Its closest relative is the Natal spurfowl, which has a similarly vermiculated plumage.

== Range and habitat ==
It is a common resident of the Western Cape's strandveld, renosterveld and fynbos regions, especially at lower altitudes, being replaced at high altitudes by the grey-winged francolin. It is present in the succulent (i.e. westerly) karoo at lower densities, and in the Nama karoo, where it frequents the immediate vicinity of rivers. Its presence in scrub along the banks of the lower Orange and Fish Rivers appears to be a natural phenomenon. It was introduced to Robben Island where it benefits from a parasite-free environment. It forages in altered habitats like parks, croplands, orchards, vineyards, and stands of invasive rooikrans.

== Habits ==
The Cape francolin is a bird of scrubby open areas, preferably close to running water. It breeds in spring and early summer, when it is also most vocal. Its nest is a grass-lined scrape under a bush, and six to eight eggs are laid (but sometimes two females will lay in one nest). This species can become very tame if disturbance is limited, and will feed in gardens, by roadsides, or with farmyard chickens. It will run rather than fly if disturbed, but even while quite small, just a few weeks old, it flies readily and strongly when startled or pressed.

The call is a loud cackalac-cackalac-cackalac.

== Description ==
The Cape spurfowl is 40–42 cm (16–17 in) in length. The male, at 600–915 g (1.323–2.017 lb), averages larger than the female, at 435–659 g (0.959–1.453 lb). This large spurfowl appears all dark from a distance, apart from the red legs, but when seen closer the plumage is finely vermiculated in grey and white, with a plainer crown and nape.

The sexes are similar in plumage, but the male has two leg spurs, whereas the female has at best one short spur. The juvenile is similar to the adults, but has duller legs and clearer vermiculations. The large, dark francolin is unlikely to be confused with any other species in its range.
