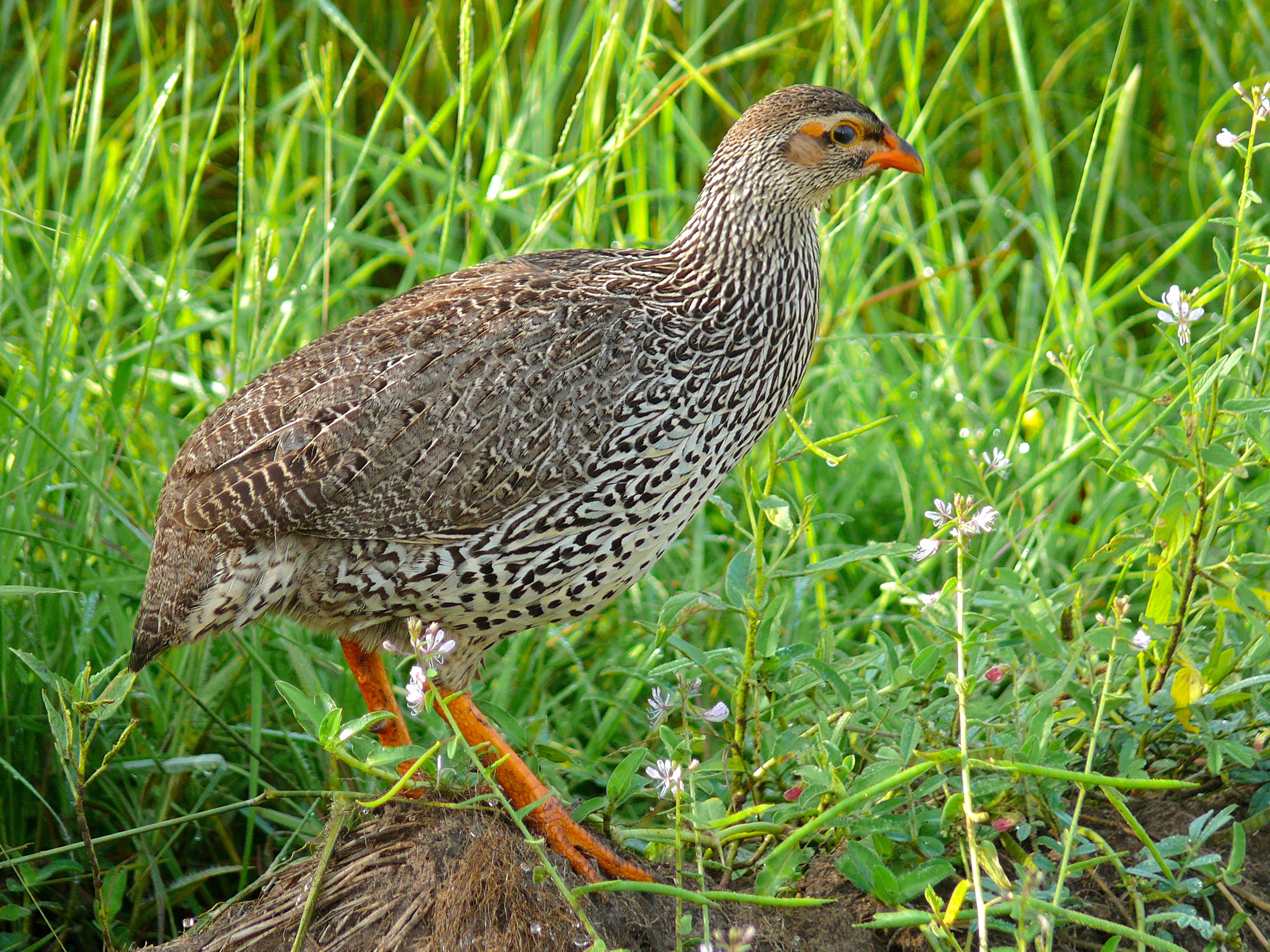

Conservation status
- Least Concern (IUCN 3.1)

Scientific classification
- Kingdom: Animalia
- Phylum: Chordata
- Class: Aves
- Order: Galliformes
- Family: Phasianidae
- Genus: Pternistis
- Species: P. icterorhynchus

Binomial name
- Pternistis icterorhynchus (Heuglin, 1863)
- geographic distribution

Synonyms
- Francolinus icterorhynchus

= Heuglin's spurfowl =

Species of bird

Heuglin's spurfowl (Pternistis icterorhynchus) is a species of bird in the family Phasianidae. It is found in Central African Republic, Democratic Republic of the Congo, South Sudan, and Uganda. The German explorer Theodor von Heuglin first described the species.

== Taxonomy ==
Heuglin's spurfowl was described in 1863 by the German ornithologist and explorer Theodor von Heuglin from specimens collected near the Pongo River in what is now the Bahr el Ghazal region of South Sudan. He coined the binomial name Francolinus icterorhynchus. The specific epithet icterorhynchus combines the Ancient Greek ikteros meaning "jaundice-yellow" and rhunkhos meaning "bill". The species is now placed in the genus Pternistis that was introduced by the German naturalist Johann Georg Wagler in 1832. A molecular phylogenetic study published in 2019 found that Heuglin's spurfowl is sister to the double-spurred spurfowl. Heuglin's spurfowl is considered to be monotypic: no subspecies are recognised.
