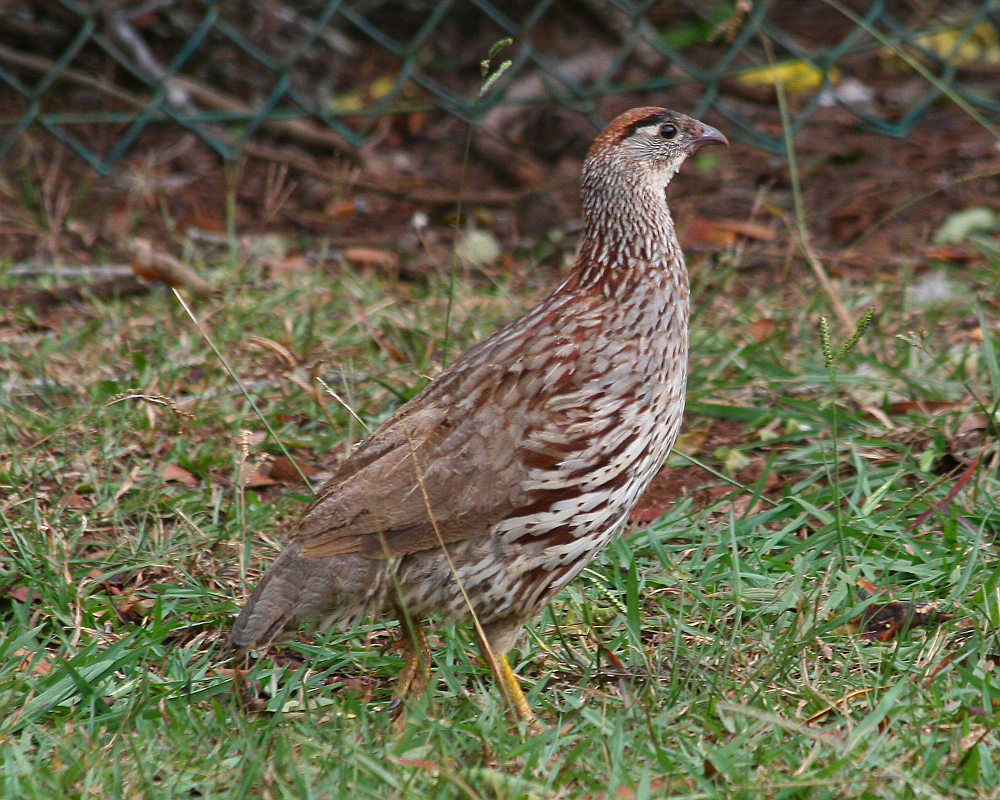

Conservation status
- Least Concern (IUCN 3.1)

Scientific classification
- Kingdom: Animalia
- Phylum: Chordata
- Class: Aves
- Order: Galliformes
- Family: Phasianidae
- Genus: Pternistis
- Species: P. erckelii

Binomial name
- Pternistis erckelii (Rüppell, 1835)
- geographic distribution

Synonyms
- Francolinus erckelii

= Erckel's spurfowl =

Species of bird

Erckel's spurfowl (Pternistis erckelii), also known as Erckel's francolin, is a species of game bird in the family Phasianidae.

== Taxonomy ==
Erckel's spurfowl was described in 1935 by the German naturalist Eduard Rüppell from specimens collected in the mountains of Ethiopia. He coined the binomial name Perdix erckelii. The specific epithet was chosen by Rüppell to honour his assistant, Theodor Erckel (1811–1897), who had helped with the collection of specimens. The species is now placed in the genus Pternistis that was introduced by the German naturalist Johann Georg Wagler in 1832. Erckel's spurfowl is monotypic: no subspecies are recognised. A phylogenetic study published in 2019 found that Erckel's spurfowl was most closely related to the Djibouti spurfowl.

== Description ==
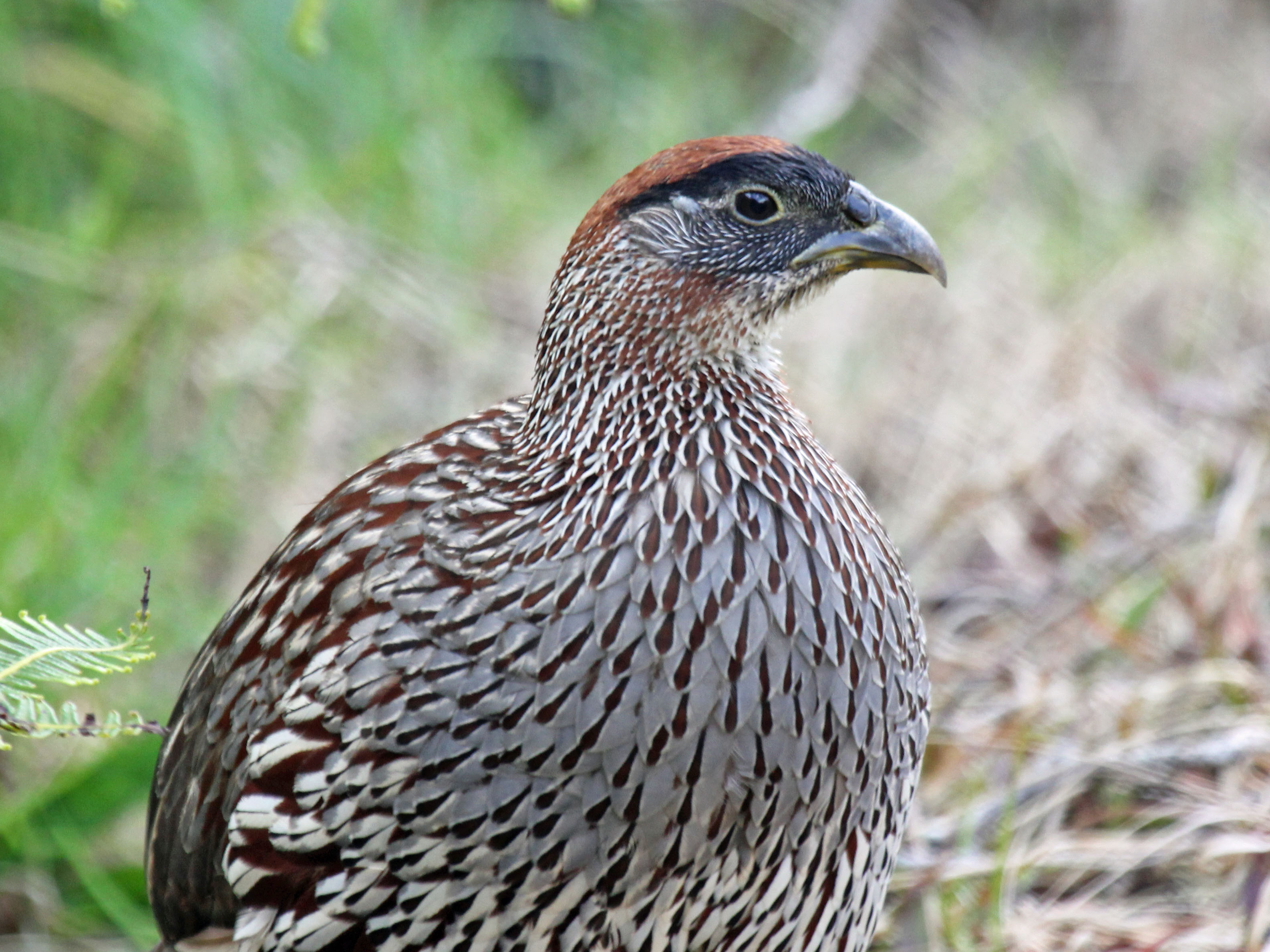
At Kauai, Hawaii

The largest African spurfowl, Erckel's spurfowl is 38–43 cm (15–17 in) in length, with females being slightly smaller than males. Males grow to 1.05–1.59 kg (2.3–3.5 lb), based on a sample of three specimens, and a single female specimen was observed to weigh 1.136 kg (2.50 lb). Males and females have similar plumage. The body is covered with stripes of chestnut-color, on its upperside and underside. It has a black face and bill, a chestnut-colored head top and back of neck, and yellow legs. It has white ear coverts and a single streak of white behind its eye.

== Distribution and habitat ==
Erckel's spurfowl is native to the northern parts of Eritrea and Ethiopia, as well as northeast Sudan. In 1957, the species was introduced to Hawaii as a gamebird; it has also been introduced to Italy. It lives in areas 2,000 to 3,500 metres (6,600 to 11,500 ft) above sea level, such as in the mountainous Degua Tembien district. Although its exact population is unknown, it is a common species with an estimated range of 580,000 km^{2} (220,000 sq mi), causing it to be listed as a species of least concern by the International Union for Conservation of Nature.

== Behavior and ecology ==
Erckel's spurfowl can hunt alone or in pairs, in scrublands or at the edge of forests. Its diet consists of plants, such as berries, seeds, and shoots, as well as insects. It is frequently inactive, but if threatened it runs up a hill. It produces territorial calls, which consist of 15–20 notes and are made from clifftops and large rocks. The species' vocalizations are frequently repeated over a long period, and have been described as "an insane cackled laughter, speeding towards the end with a bouncing ball pattern". Eggs are laid during the rainy season from April to November, with the exact time depending on the location; they are laid in May and September to November in Ethiopia, while they are laid in April and May in Sudan.
