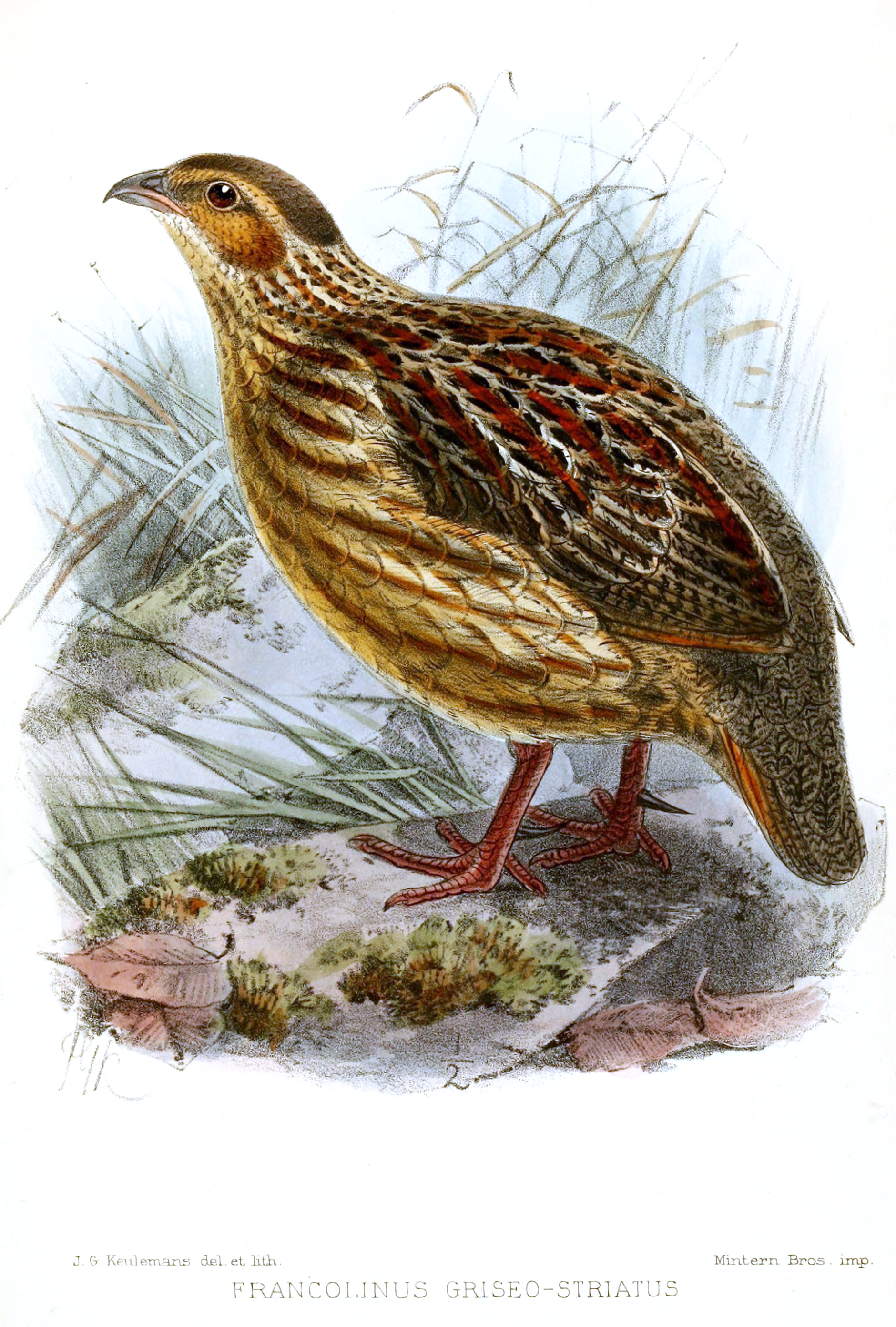

Conservation status
- Least Concern (IUCN 3.1)

Scientific classification
- Kingdom: Animalia
- Phylum: Chordata
- Class: Aves
- Order: Galliformes
- Family: Phasianidae
- Genus: Pternistis
- Species: P. griseostriatus

Binomial name
- Pternistis griseostriatus (Ogilvie-Grant, 1890)
- geographic distribution

Synonyms
- Francolinus griseostriatus protonym

= Grey-striped spurfowl =

Species of bird

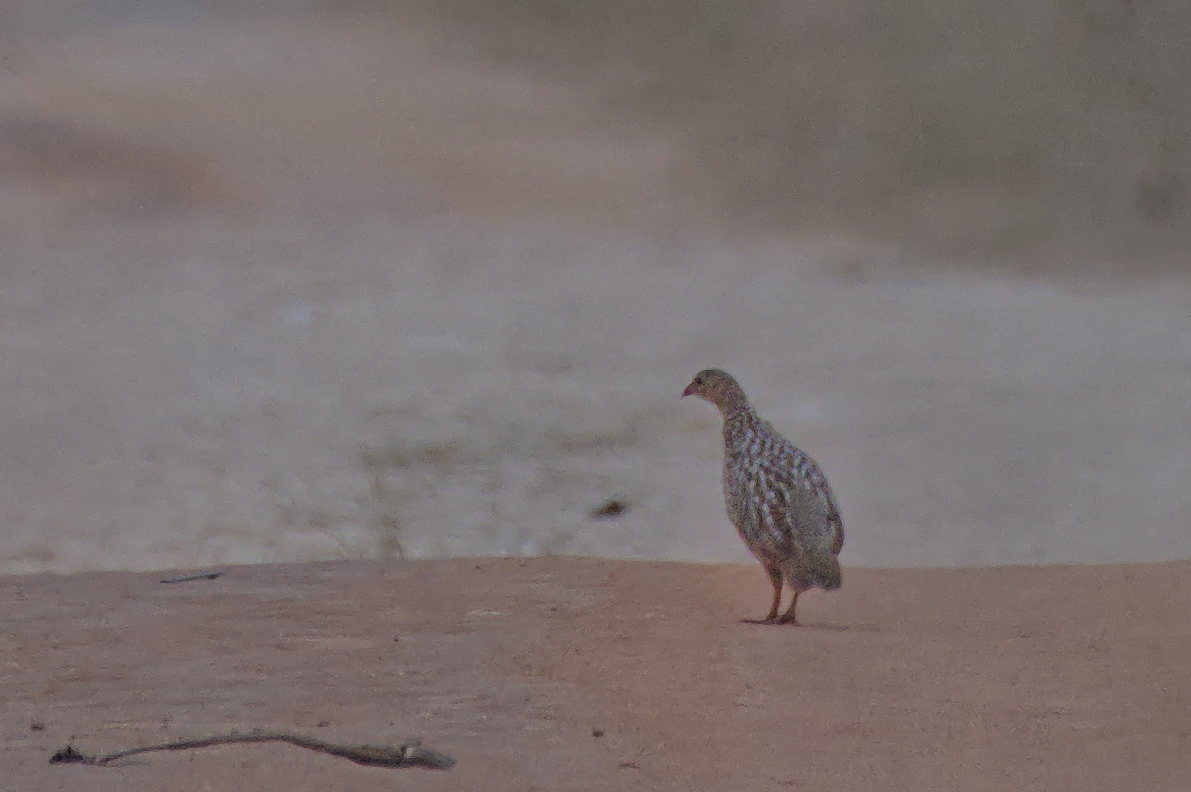
Grey-striped Spurfowl Angola

The grey-striped spurfowl (Pternistis griseostriatus) is a species of bird in the family Phasianidae. It is found only in Angola.

Its natural habitats are subtropical or tropical dry forest, subtropical or tropical moist lowland forest, and subtropical or tropical dry lowland grassland. It is threatened by habitat loss.

== Taxonomy ==
The grey-striped spurfowl was described in 1890 by the Scottish ornithologist William Robert Ogilvie-Grant from a single specimen and given the binomial name Francolinus griseostriatus. Although Ogilvie-Grant specified the habitat as the "Congo River", the type locality has been designated as the Cuanza River area of Angola. The specific epithet griseostriatus combines the Medieval Latin griseus meaning "grey" with the Latin striatus meaning "striated". The species is now placed in the genus Pternistis that was introduced by the German naturalist Johann Georg Wagler in 1832. The grey-striped spurfowl is considered as monototypic: no subspecies are recognised.
