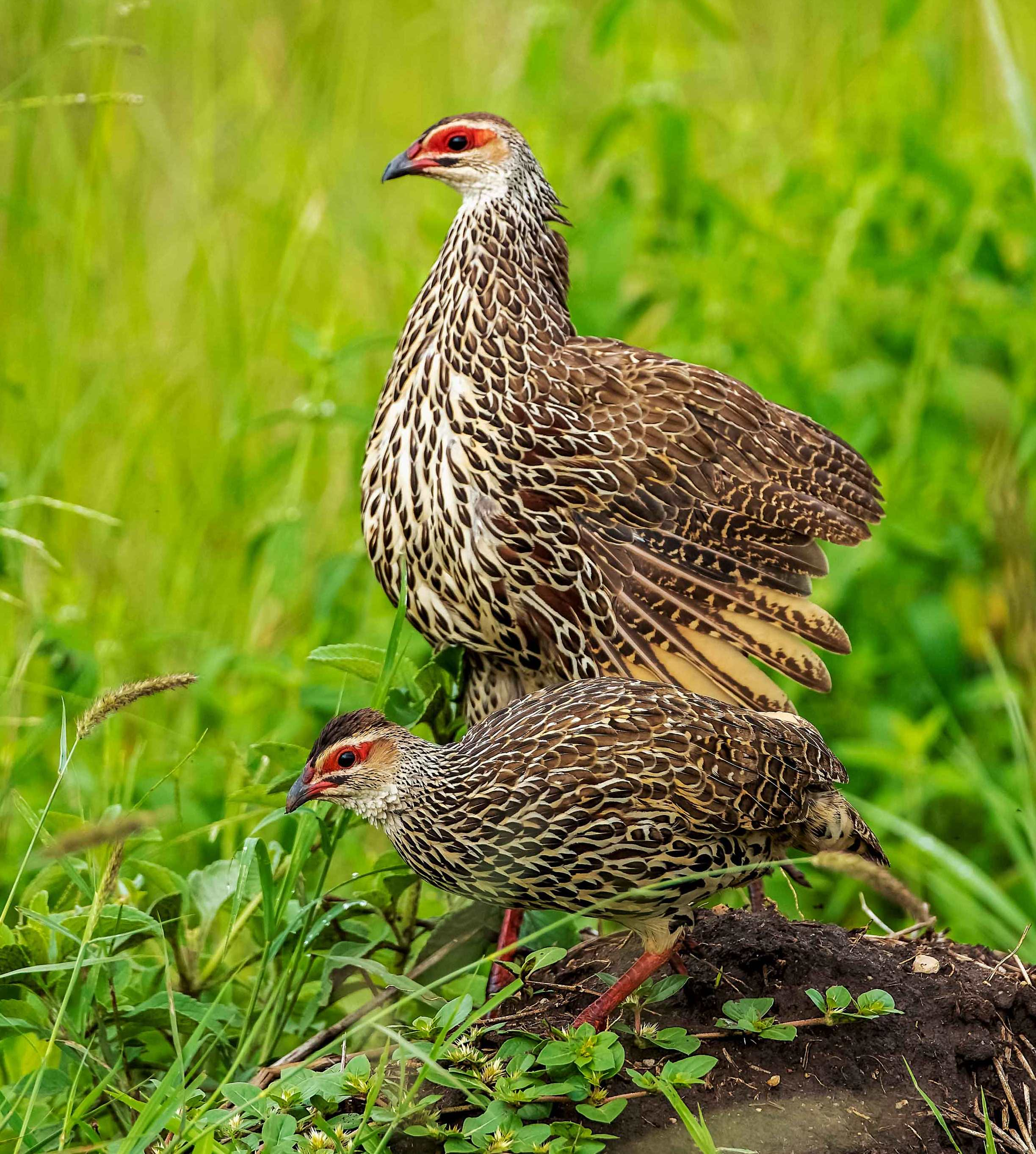
- The nominate subspecies at Kidepo Valley National Park in northeastern Uganda

Conservation status
- Least Concern (IUCN 3.1)

Scientific classification
- Kingdom: Animalia
- Phylum: Chordata
- Class: Aves
- Order: Galliformes
- Family: Phasianidae
- Genus: Pternistis
- Species: P. clappertoni

Binomial name
- Pternistis clappertoni (Children & Vigors, 1826)
- native range

Synonyms
- Francolinus clappertoni

= Clapperton's spurfowl =

Species of bird

Clapperton's spurfowl (Pternistis clappertoni) is a species of bird in the family Phasianidae. It is found in Cameroon, Central African Republic, Chad, Eritrea, Ethiopia, Mali, Mauritania, Niger, Nigeria, Sudan, and Uganda.

== Taxonomy ==
Clapperton's spurfowl was described in 1826 by John George Children and Nicholas Aylward Vigors in an appendix to the Narrative of Travels and Discoveries in Northern and Central Africa by the explorers Dixon Denham and Hugh Clapperton. Children and Vigors chose to honour Clapperton and coined the binomial name Francolinus clappertoni. In their publication Children and Vigors did not specify where the specimen had been collected but the type locality was later designated as Borno in northeast Nigeria. The species is now placed in the genus Pternistis that was introduced by the German naturalist Johann Georg Wagler in 1832. A molecular phylogenetic study published in 2019 found that Clapperton's spurfowl is sister to Harwood's spurfowl.

Two subspecies are now recognised:

- P. c. clappertoni (Children & Vigors, 1826) — Mali to south Sudan, east South Sudan, northeast Uganda and west Ethiopia (Note: P. c. clappertoni includes the proposed subspecies koenigseggi, heuglini, nigrosquamatus and gedgii.)
- P. c. sharpii (Ogilvie-Grant, 1892) — north and central Ethiopia, Eritrea
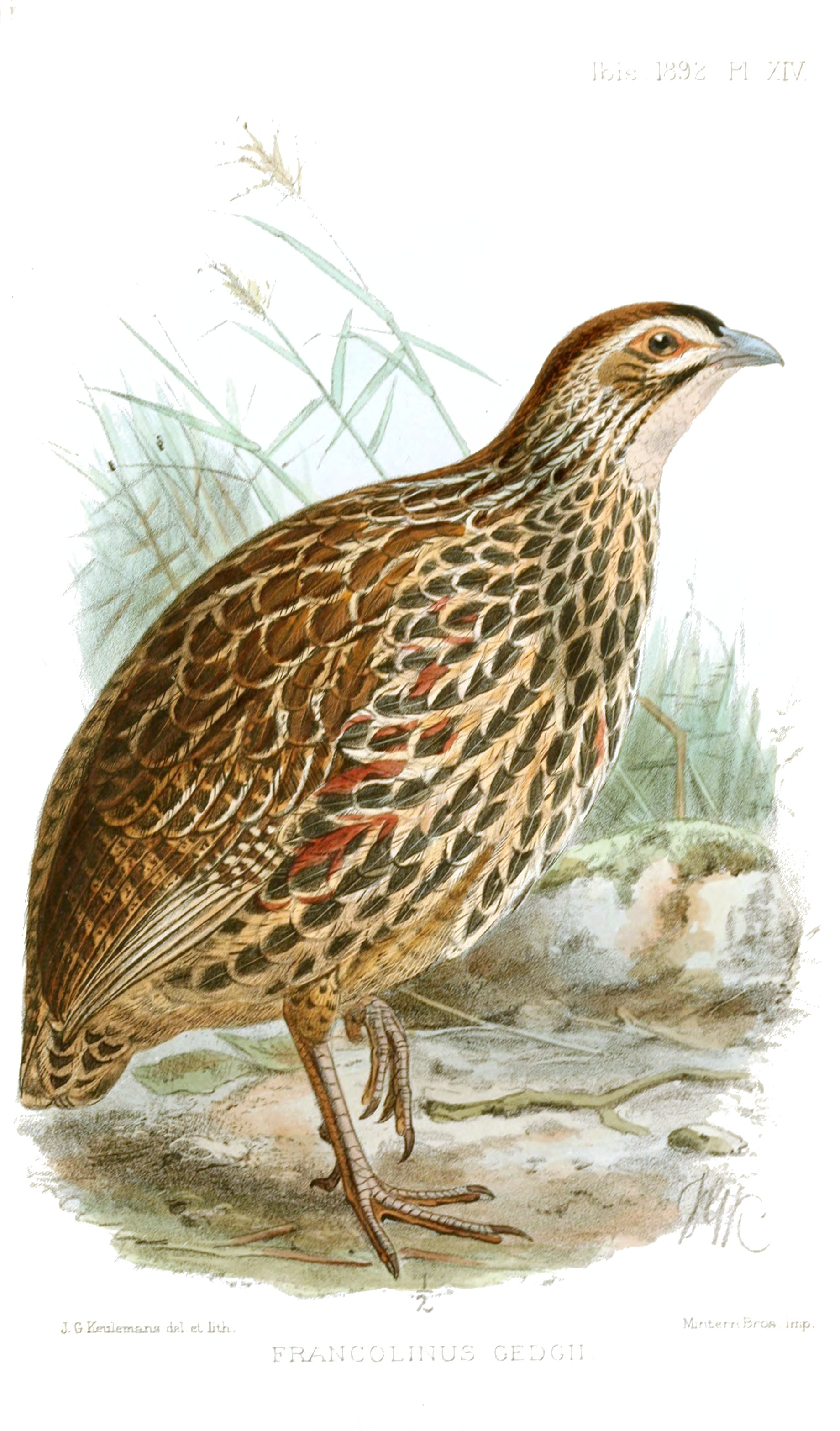
Nominate subspecies illustrated by Keulemans

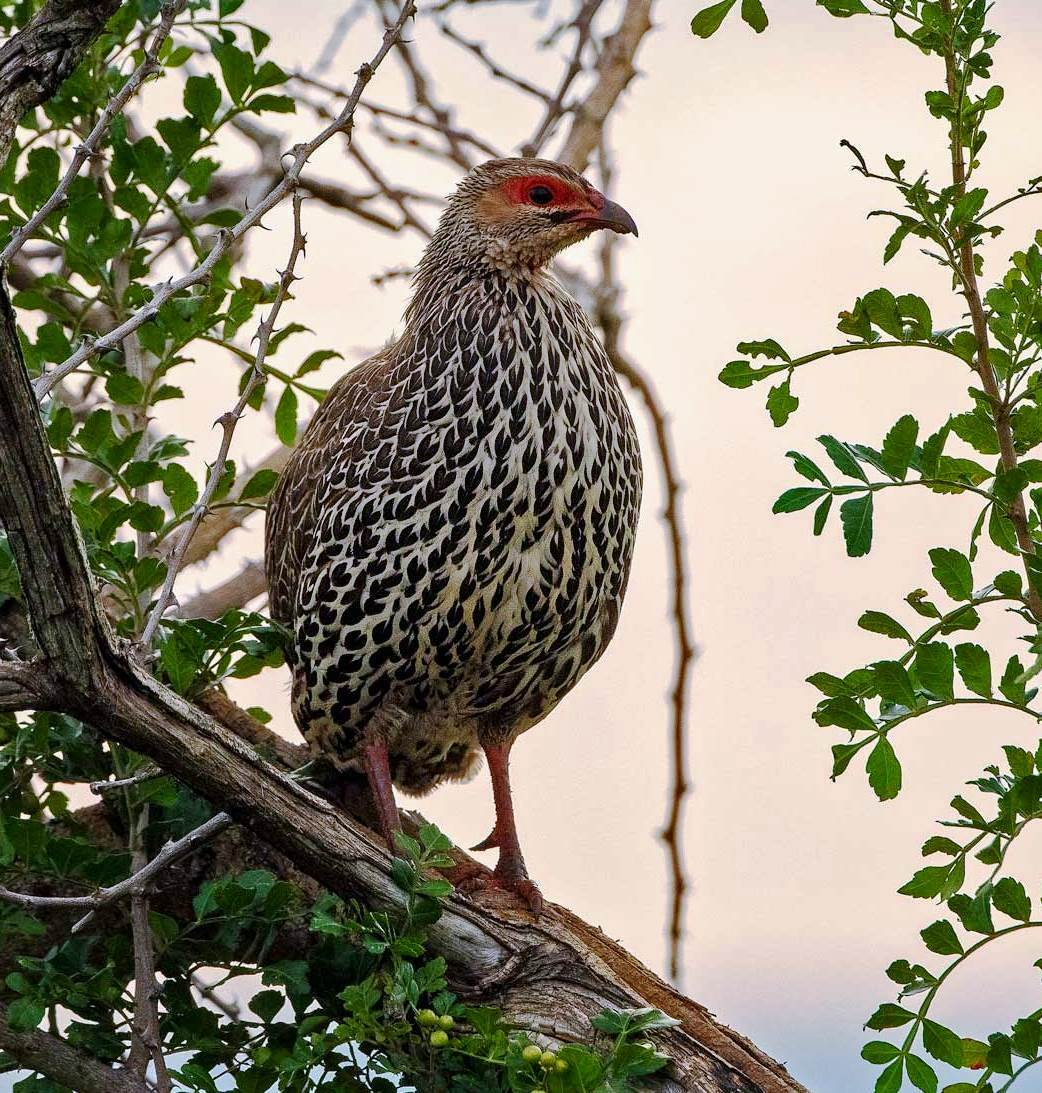
On a perch in Kidepo Valley National Park

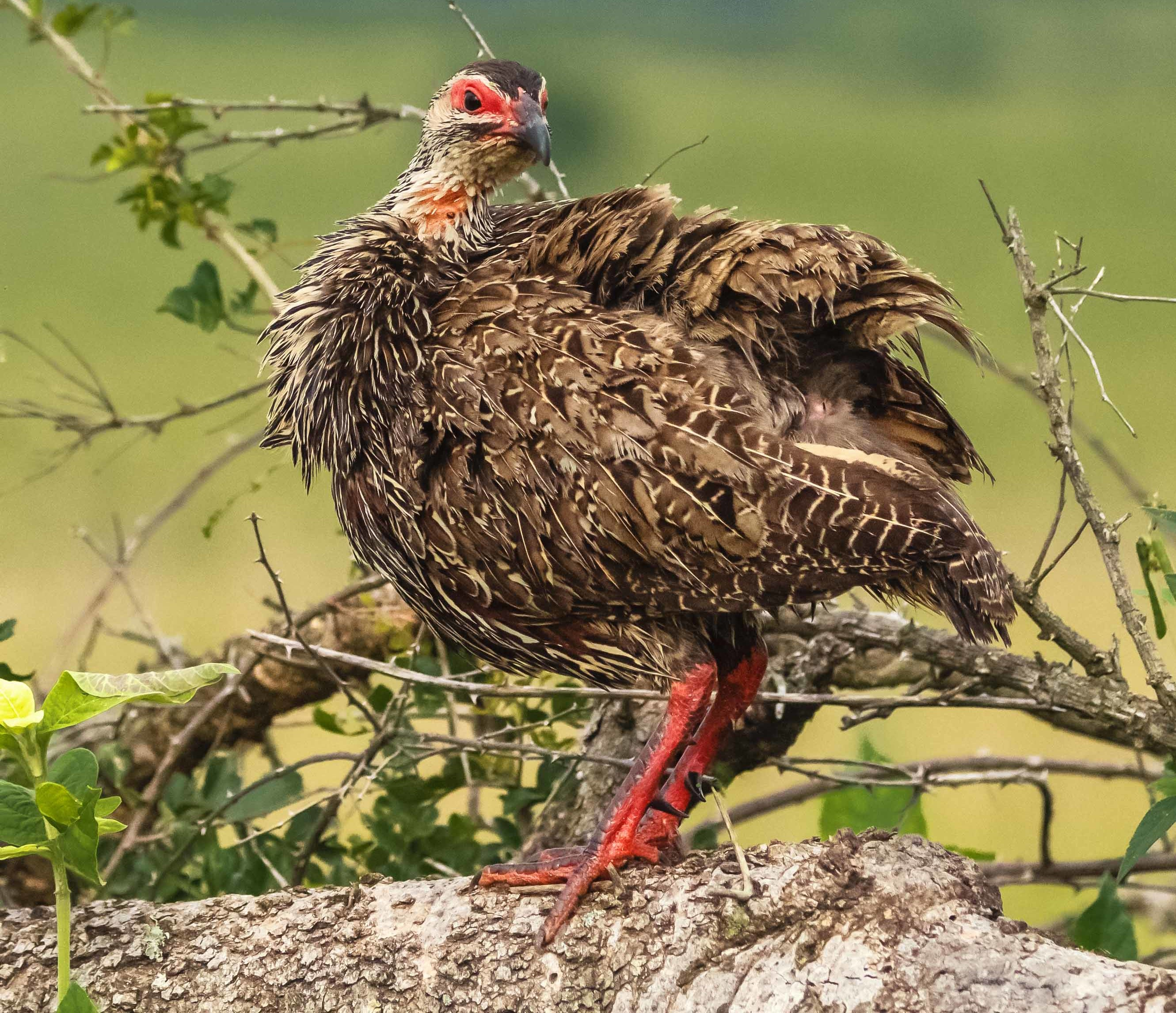
Preening bird in Kidepo Valley National Park
