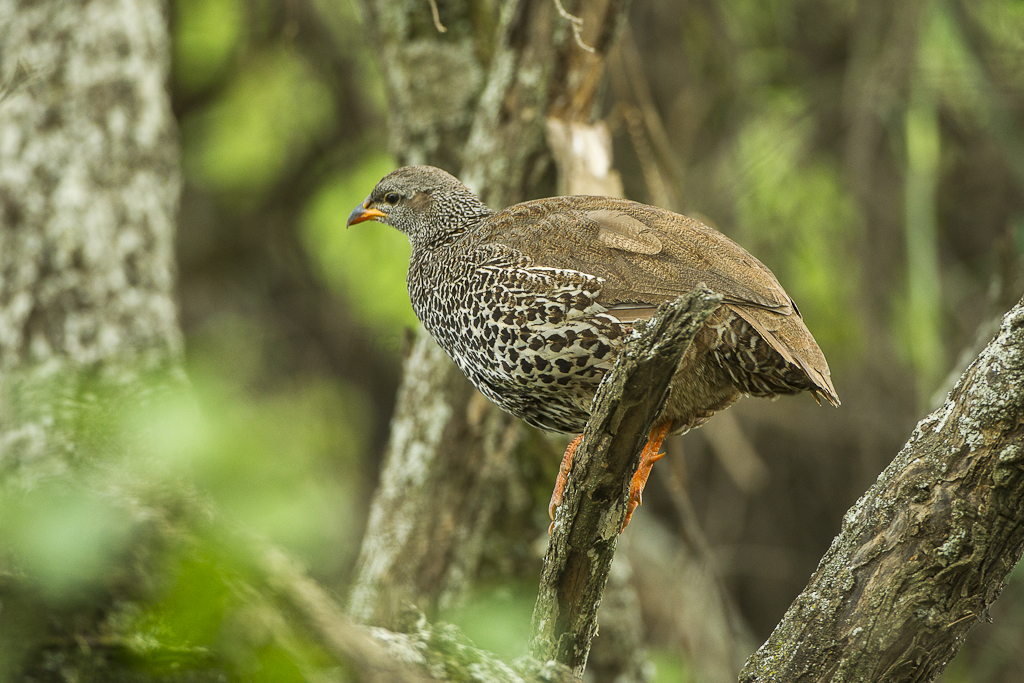
- Male

Conservation status
- Least Concern (IUCN 3.1)

Scientific classification
- Kingdom: Animalia
- Phylum: Chordata
- Class: Aves
- Order: Galliformes
- Family: Phasianidae
- Genus: Pternistis
- Species: P. hildebrandti

Binomial name
- Pternistis hildebrandti (Cabanis, 1878)
- geographic distribution

Synonyms
- Francolinus hildebrandti

= Hildebrandt's spurfowl =

Species of bird

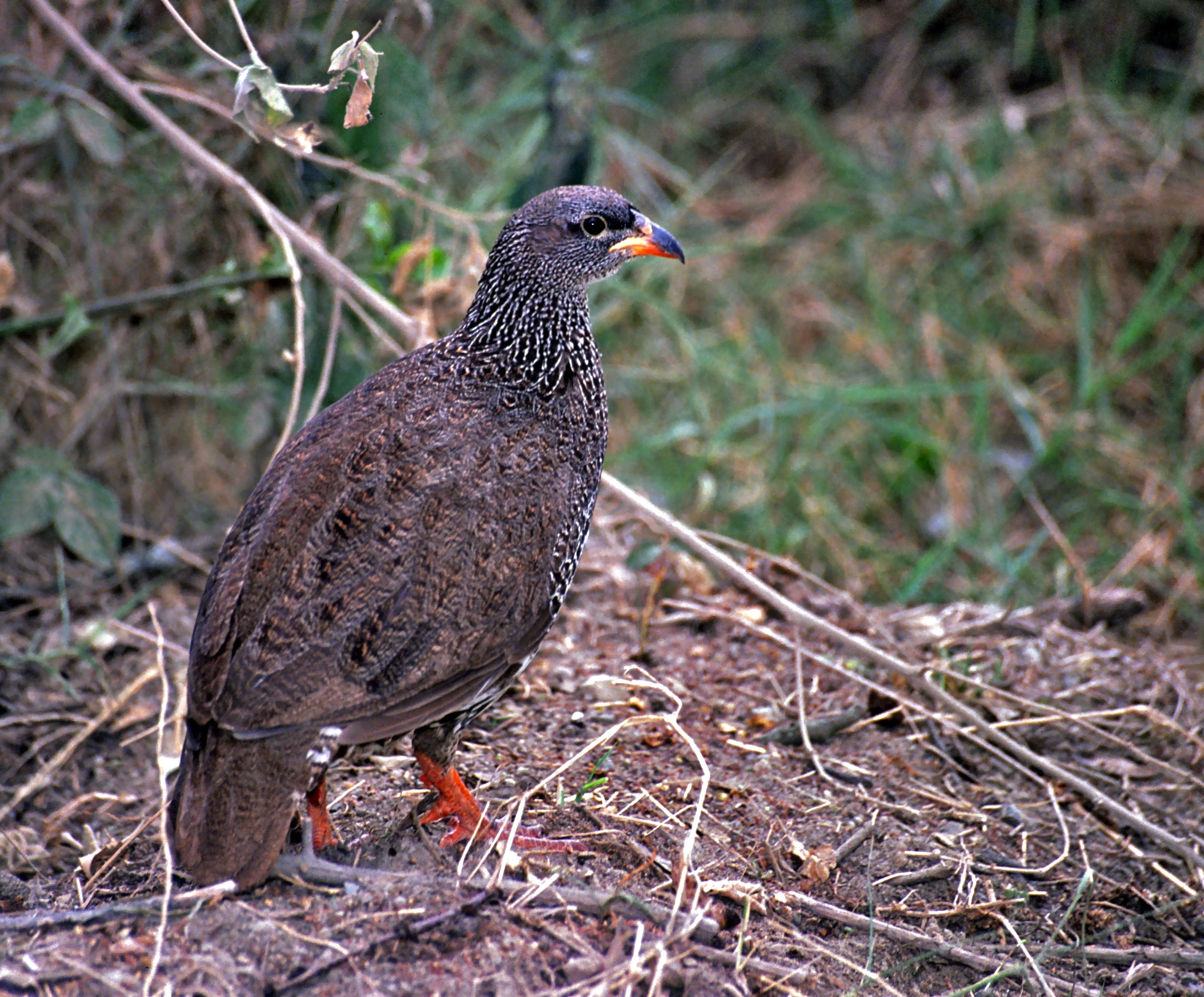

Hildebrandt's spurfowl (Pternistis hildebrandti) is a species of bird in the family Phasianidae. It is found in Burundi, Democratic Republic of the Congo, Kenya, Malawi, Mozambique, Rwanda, Tanzania, and Zambia. The species is named for Johann Maria Hildebrandt, who collected the first specimens in Kenya. The sexes differ markedly in their plumage and females are smaller than males.

== Taxonomy ==
Hildebrandt's spurfowl was described in 1878 by the German ornithologist Jean Cabanis based on specimens collected by the zoologist Johann Maria Hildebrandt in the Taita–Taveta County of Kenya. Cabanis honoured Hildebrandt and coined the scientific name Francolinus (Scleroptera) hildebrandti. The species is now placed in the genus Pternistis that was introduced by the German naturalist Johann Georg Wagler in 1832. A phylogenetic study published in 2019 found that Hildebrandt's spurfowl is sister to the Natal spurfowl.

Two subspecies are recognised:

- P. h. hildebrandti (Cabanis, 1878) — Kenya, north and west Tanzania, southeast Democratic Republic of the Congo, northeast Zambia
- P. h. johnstoni (Shelley, 1894) — southeast Tanzania, north Mozambique, Malawi
