= Mount Cameroon spurfowl =

Conservation status
- Endangered (IUCN 3.1)

Scientific classification
- Kingdom: Animalia
- Phylum: Chordata
- Class: Aves
- Order: Galliformes
- Family: Phasianidae
- Genus: Pternistis
- Species: P. camerunensis

Binomial name
- Pternistis camerunensis (Alexander, 1909)
- geographic distribution

Synonyms
- Francolinus camerunensis

Species of bird

The Mount Cameroon spurfowl (Pternistis camerunensis) is a bird species in the pheasant family Phasianidae. It is found only in Cameroon.

Its natural habitat is subtropical or tropical moist montane forests. It is threatened by habitat loss.

== Taxonomy ==
The Mount Cameroon spurfowl was described in 1909 by the British Army officer Boyd Alexander from a specimen collected on Mount Cameroon. He coined the binomial name Francolinus camerunensis. The species is now placed in the genus Pternistis that was introduced by the German naturalist Johann Georg Wagler in 1832. The species is considered to be monotypic: no subspecies are recognised.
