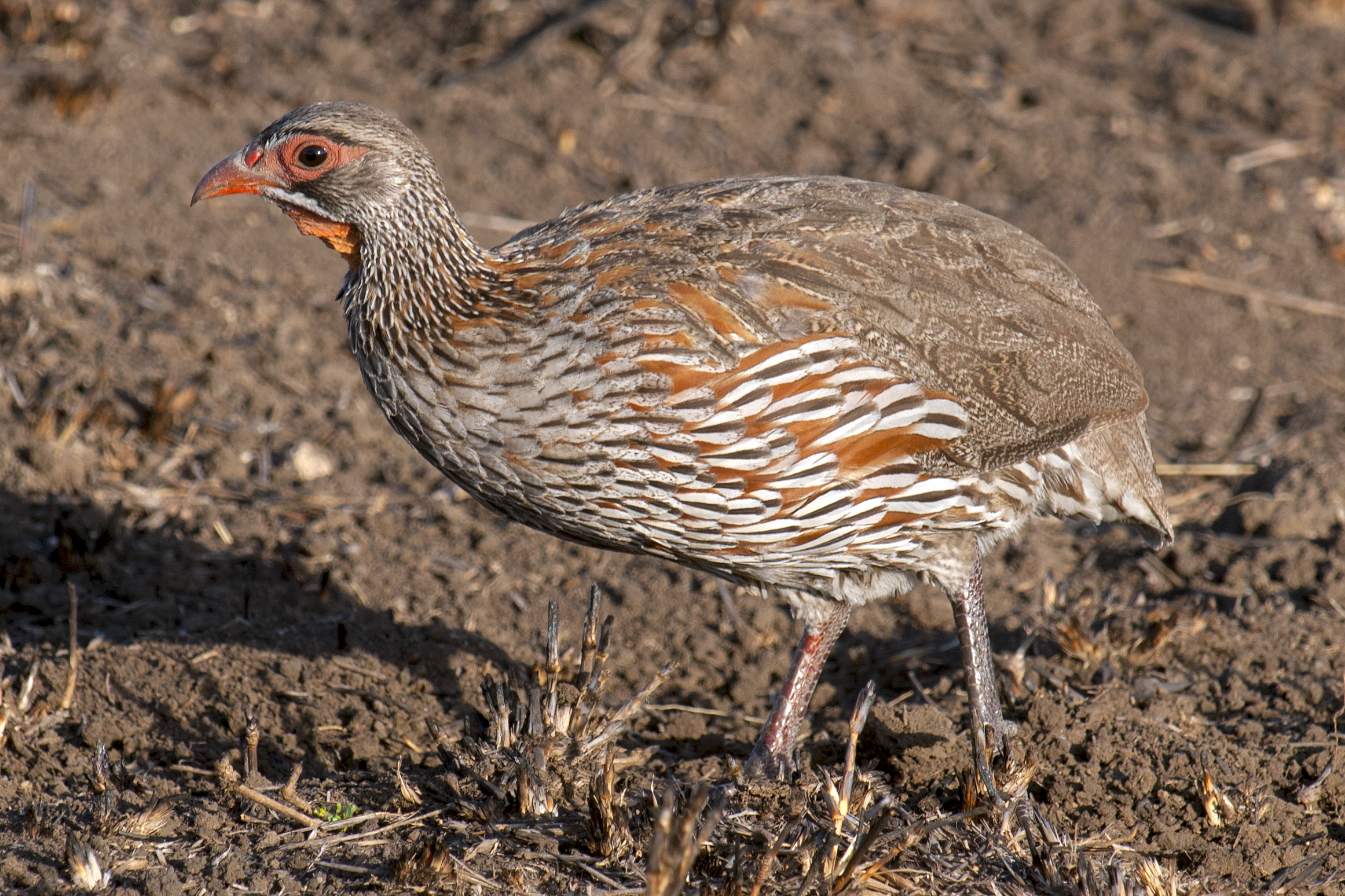
- Serengeti National Park, Tanzania

Conservation status
- Least Concern (IUCN 3.1)

Scientific classification
- Kingdom: Animalia
- Phylum: Chordata
- Class: Aves
- Order: Galliformes
- Family: Phasianidae
- Genus: Pternistis
- Species: P. rufopictus

Binomial name
- Pternistis rufopictus Reichenow, 1887
- geographic distribution

Synonyms
- Francolinus rufopictus

= Grey-breasted spurfowl =

Species of bird

The grey-breasted spurfowl or grey-breasted francolin (Pternistis rufopictus) is a species of bird in the family Phasianidae. It is found only in Tanzania.

The grey-breasted spurfowl was described by the German ornithologist Anton Reichenow in 1887 and given its current binomial name Pternistis rufopictus. The specific epithet combines the Latin rufus meaning "red" and pictus meaning "painted". A molecular phylogenetic study published in 2019 found that the grey-breasted spurfowl is sister to the red-necked spurfowl. The species is monotypic: no subspecies are recognised.
