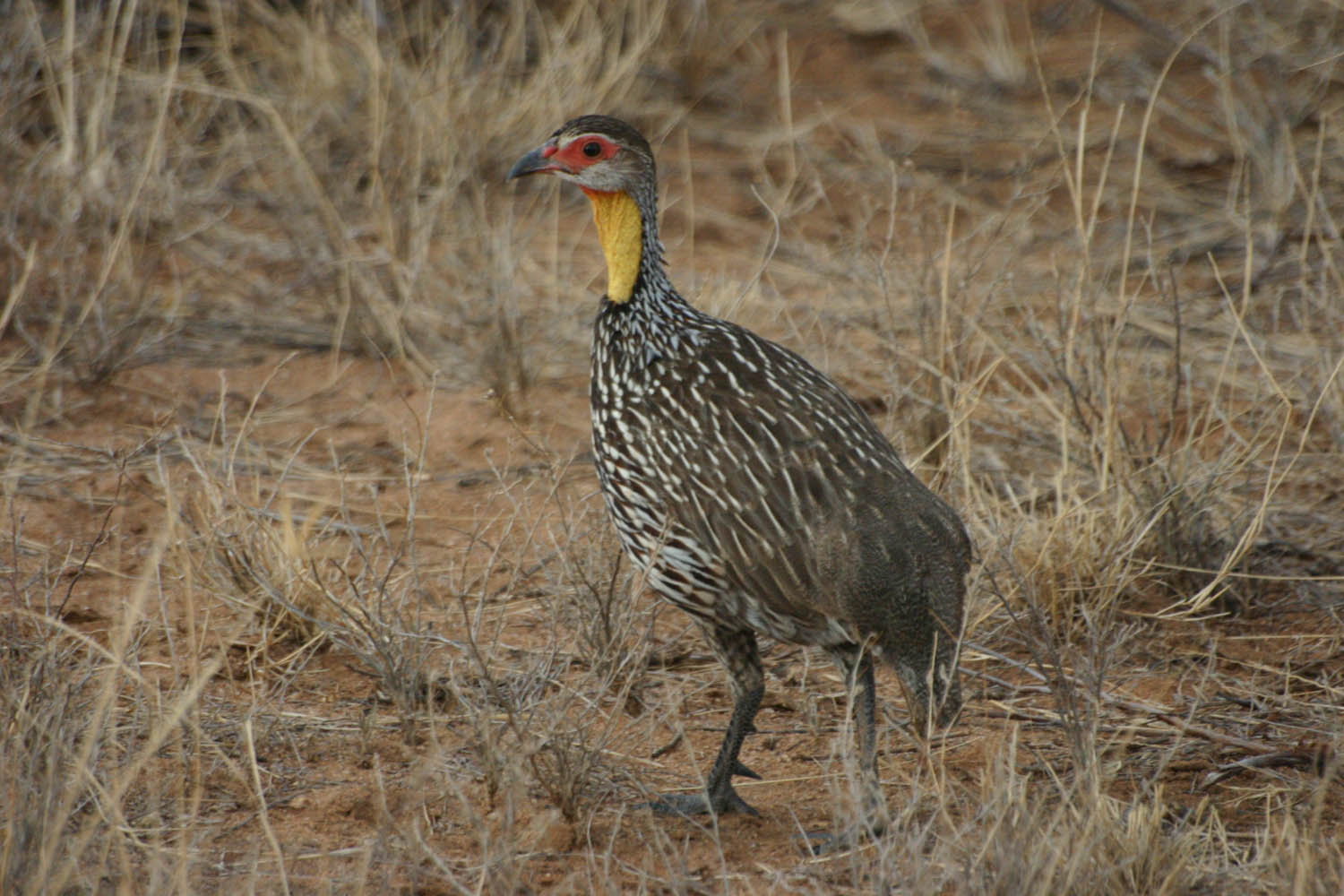
- In Samburu National Reserve, Kenya

Conservation status
- Least Concern (IUCN 3.1)

Scientific classification
- Kingdom: Animalia
- Phylum: Chordata
- Class: Aves
- Order: Galliformes
- Family: Phasianidae
- Genus: Pternistis
- Species: P. leucoscepus

Binomial name
- Pternistis leucoscepus (Gray, GR, 1867)
- geographic distribution

Synonyms
- Francolinus leucoscepus

Audio
- Calls recorded in Kiboko, Kenya

= Yellow-necked spurfowl =

Species of bird

The yellow-necked spurfowl or yellow-necked francolin (Pternistis leucoscepus) is a species of bird in the family Phasianidae. It is found in Djibouti, Eritrea, Ethiopia, Kenya, Somalia, Sudan, Tanzania, and Uganda. This species is named for the yellow patch found on its neck. Males of this species have been noted to have spurs on the back of their legs.

== Taxonomy ==
The yellow-necked spurfowl was described in 1867 by the English ornithologist George Robert Gray and given the binomial name Francolinus leucoscepus. The type locality is Ethiopia. The specific epithet leucoscepus combines the Ancient Greek leukos meaning "white" and skepas meaning "covering" or "mantle". The species is now placed in the genus Pternistis that was introduced by the German naturalist Johann Georg Wagler in 1832.

Two subspecies are recognised:

- P. l. leucoscepus (Gray, GR, 1867) — Eritrea and adjacent north Ethiopia
- P. l. infuscatus Cabanis, 1868 — north Somalia and Djibouti south through Ethiopia, east South Sudan, south Somalia, northeast Uganda, Kenya and north central Tanzania

== Behavior ==
It has been noted that this bird is most active at dawn and dusk. The bird is also noted to be very adaptable, it can continue to live in land after agriculture begins, it only leaves lands when heavy human occupation begins.

== Call ==
The call of a yellow-necked spurfowl is a series of scratchy descending upslurs, up to seven in a series. Male yellow-necked spurfowl often call while standing on top of mounds of earth or rock, often termite mounds.

== Conservation status ==
The yellow-necked spurfowl is not in the threshold for vulnerable species despite the fact that its population (though unquantified) is thought to be in decline (though not at a fast rate). The primary threat to the species is over-hunting.

== Gallery ==
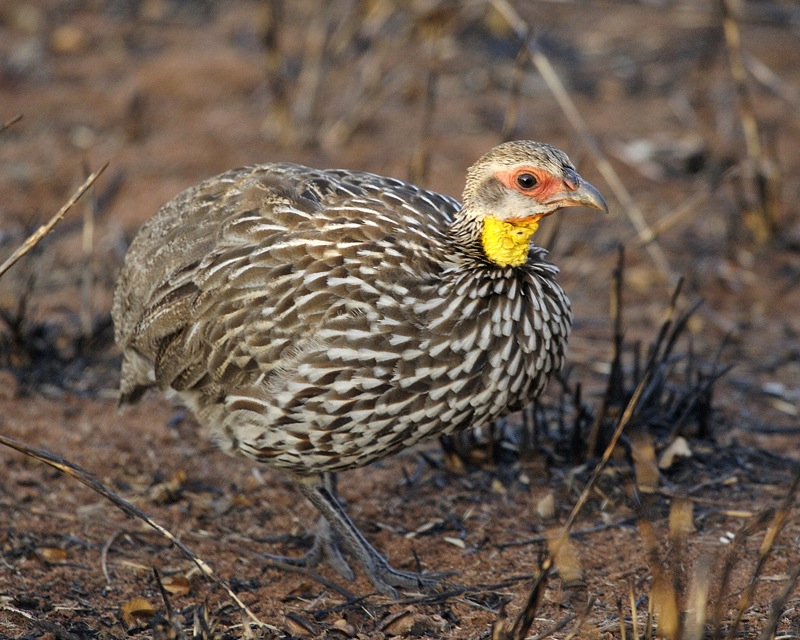
In Tsavo East National Park, Kenya, Africa

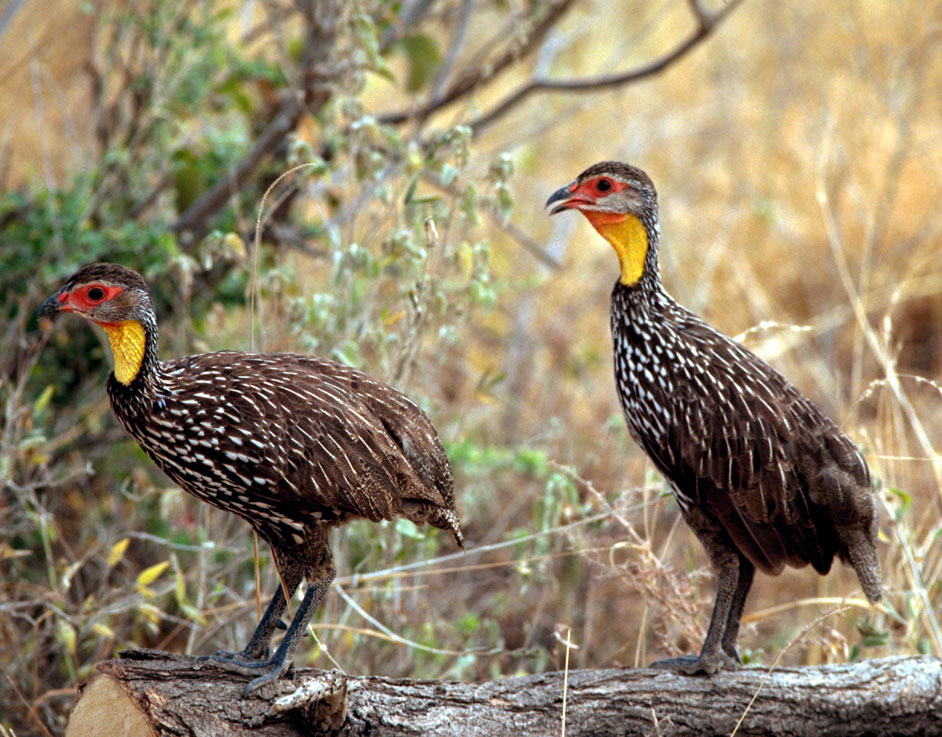
From US Fish and Wildlife Service image library

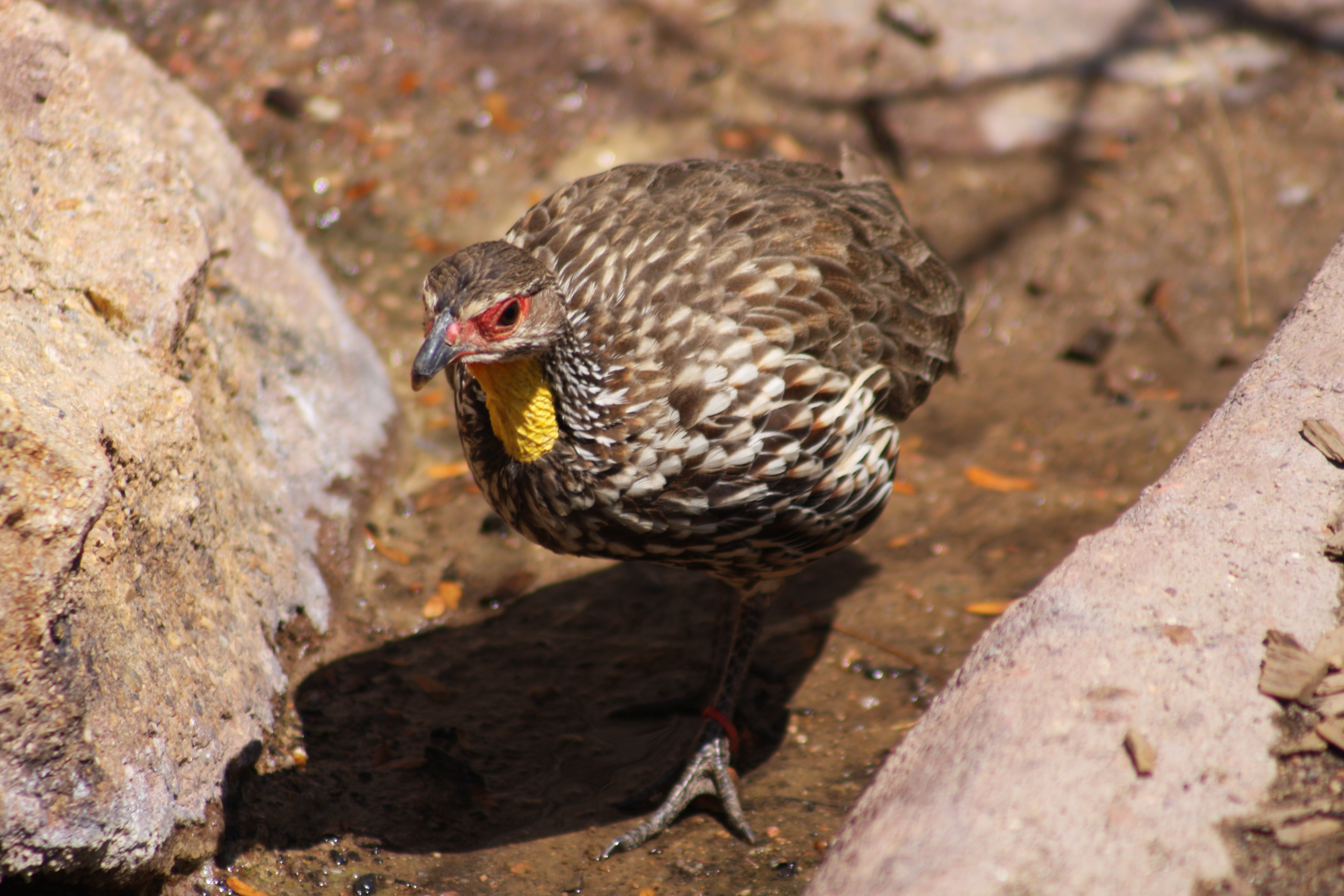
At Denver Zoo, USA

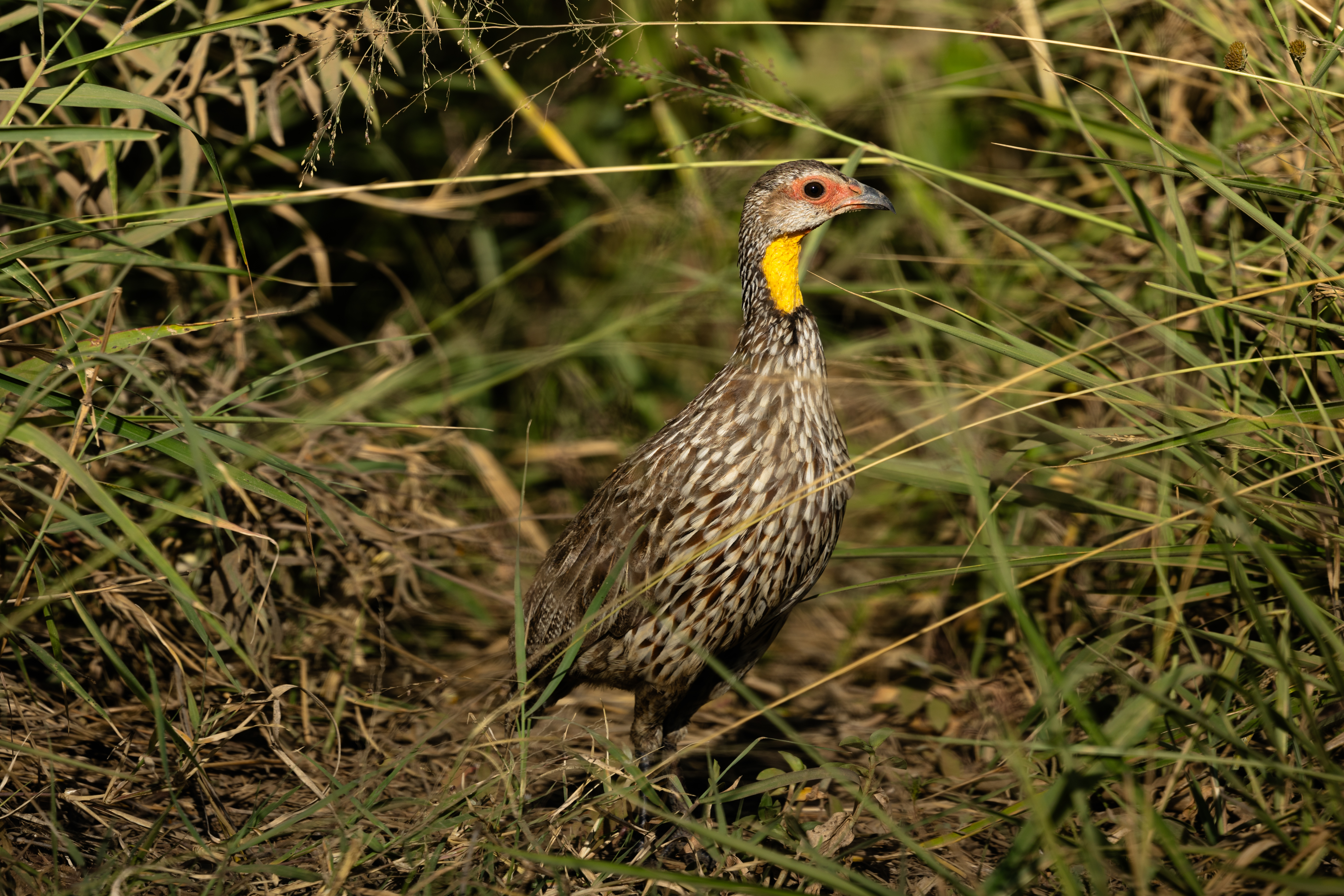
In Nairobi National Park, Kenya

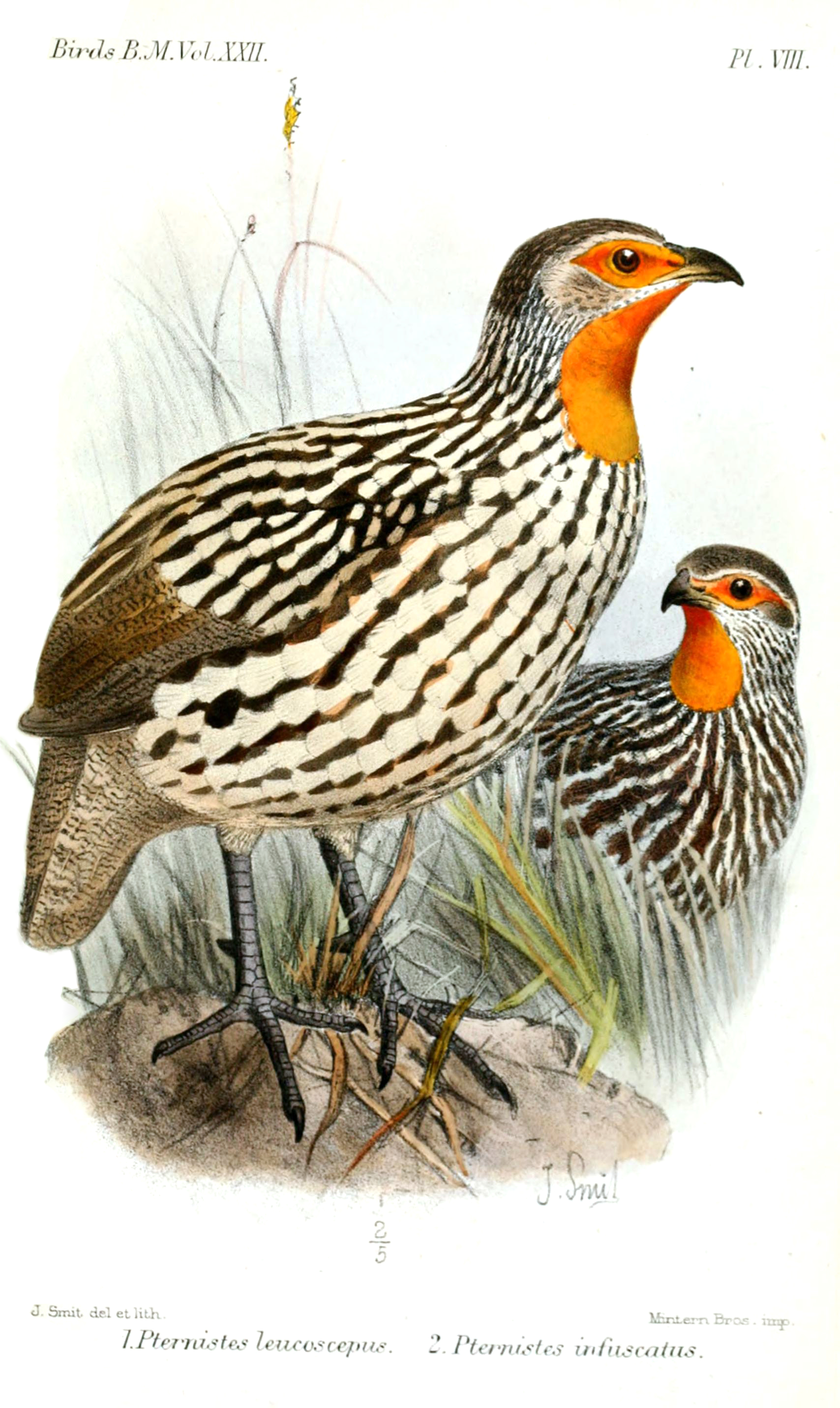
Illustration by Joseph Smit, 1893
