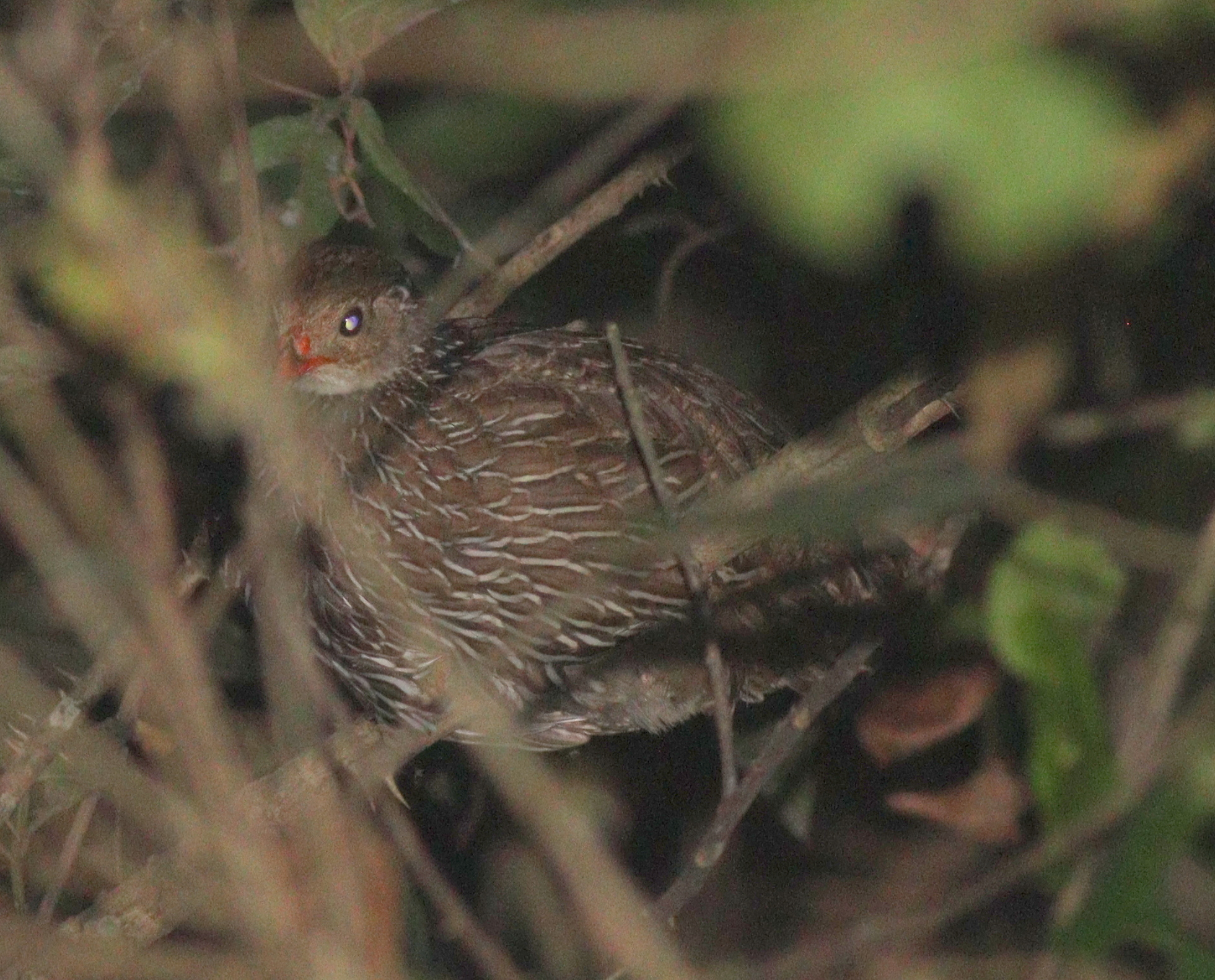

Conservation status
- Least Concern (IUCN 3.1)

Scientific classification
- Kingdom: Animalia
- Phylum: Chordata
- Class: Aves
- Order: Galliformes
- Family: Phasianidae
- Genus: Pternistis
- Species: P. ahantensis

Binomial name
- Pternistis ahantensis (Temminck, 1854)
- geographic distribution

Synonyms
- Francolinus ahantensis

= Ahanta spurfowl =

Species of bird

The Ahanta francolin or Ahanta spurfowl (Pternistis ahantensis) is a species of bird in the pheasant family, Phasianidae. It is native to western Africa, where it occurs in Benin, Ivory Coast, Gambia, Ghana, Guinea, Guinea-Bissau, Liberia, Mali, Nigeria, Senegal, Sierra Leone, and Togo.

== Taxonomy ==
The Ahanta francolin was described in 1854 by the Dutch zoologist Coenraad Jacob Temminck from specimens collected in the Dutch Gold Coast, now southern Ghana, and given the binomial name Francolinus ahantensis. Ahanta was the name of a region and a people in what is now the Western Region of the Republic of Ghana. The species is now placed in the genus Pternistis that was introduced by the German naturalist Johann Georg Wagler in 1832. The Ahanta spurfowl is treated as monotypic: the proposed subspecies hopkinsoni is not recognised.
