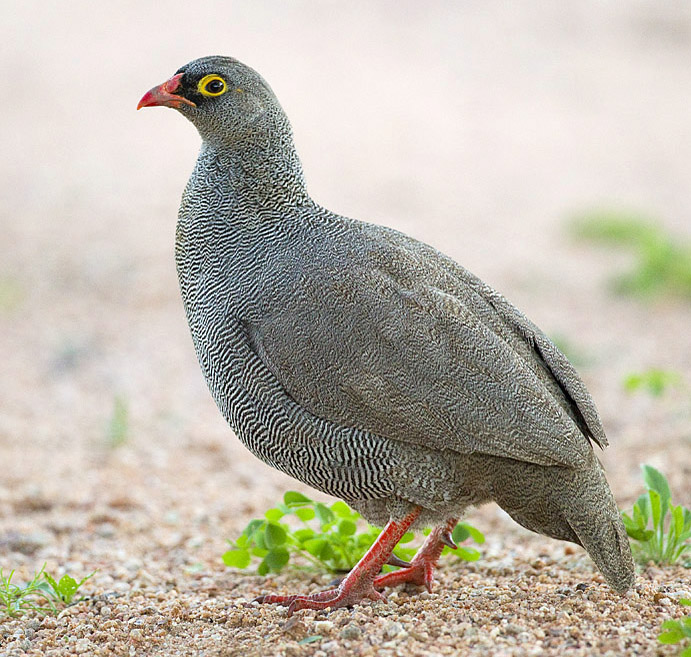

Conservation status
- Least Concern (IUCN 3.1)

Scientific classification
- Kingdom: Animalia
- Phylum: Chordata
- Class: Aves
- Order: Galliformes
- Family: Phasianidae
- Genus: Pternistis
- Species: P. adspersus

Binomial name
- Pternistis adspersus (Waterhouse, 1838)
- geographic distribution

Synonyms
- Francolinus adspersus

Audio
- Adult bird and calls recorded in Namibia

= Red-billed spurfowl =

Species of bird

The red-billed spurfowl (Pternistis adspersus), also known as the red-billed francolin, is a species of bird in the family Phasianidae. It is found in Southern Africa, including Angola, Botswana, Namibia, South Africa, Zambia, and Zimbabwe.

The species exhibits sexual dimorphism in size. Males are larger, measuring 38 cm (15 in) in length and weighing 340–635 g (12.0–22.4 oz), whereas females measure 33 cm (13 in) in length and weigh 340–549 g (12.0–19.4 oz). The species has barred underparts (in contrast to the related Natal spurfowl) and a conspicuous yellow eye-ring.

== Taxonomy ==
The red-billed spurfowl was described in 1838 by the English naturalist George Robert Waterhouse from specimens collected by James Edward Alexander on his expedition to Namaqualand and Damaraland. Waterhouse coined the binomial name Francolinus adspersus and noted that the specimens had come near the Fish River in what is now Namibia. The specific epithet adspersus is Latin for "sprinkling". The species is now placed in the genus Pternistis that was introduced by the German naturalist Johann Georg Wagler in 1832. The red-billed spurfowl is considered as monotypic: the proposed subspecies mesicus is not recognised.
