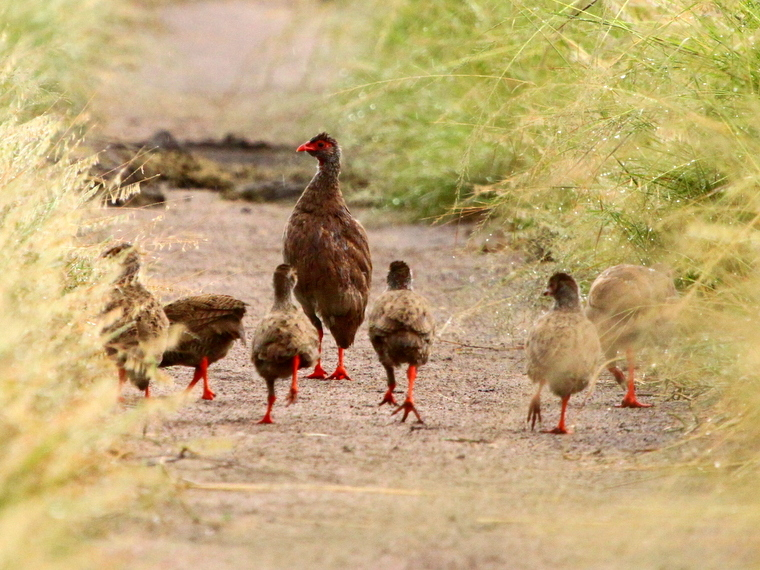

Conservation status
- Least Concern (IUCN 3.1)

Scientific classification
- Kingdom: Animalia
- Phylum: Chordata
- Class: Aves
- Order: Galliformes
- Family: Phasianidae
- Genus: Pternistis
- Species: P. nobilis

Binomial name
- Pternistis nobilis (Reichenow, 1908)
- geographic distribution

Synonyms
- Francolinus nobilis

= Handsome spurfowl =

Handsome francolin

Species of bird

The handsome spurfowl (Pternistis nobilis) is a species of bird in the pheasant family Phasianidae. It is a large, up to 35 cm long, terrestrial forest bird with a dark reddish brown plumage, grey head, red bill and legs, brown iris, bare red orbital skin and rufous grey below. Both sexes are similar. The female is slightly smaller than male. The young has duller plumage.

The handsome spurfowl is distributed in mountain forests of eastern Democratic Republic of the Congo, southwest Uganda and borders between Burundi and Rwanda. It is a shy and elusive bird, more often heard than seen. The diet consists mainly of seeds.

== Taxonomy ==
The handsome spurfowl was described in 1908 by the German ornithologist Anton Reichenow from a specimen collected on Mount Sabyinyo in the Virunga Mountains. Mount Sabyinyo is in Rwanda, on the border with the Uganda and the Democratic Republic of the Congo. Reichenow coined the binomial name Francolinus nobilis. The species is now placed in the genus Pternistis that was introduced by the German naturalist Johann Georg Wagler in 1832. The specific epithet nobilis is Latin for "noble", "famous" or "renowned". The handsome spurfowl is monotypic: no subspecies are recognised.

== Status and Conservation ==
Although locally common across much of its range, and evaluated as Least Concern on the IUCN Red List of Threatened Species. Recent surveys for the species in prime habitat in southwestern Uganda detected its presence at only 1 in 10 survey points. The research concluded that a reanalysis of the status of the handsome francolin could be justified in the light of its apparent strong preference for montane bamboo forest, which is a rare and patchy habitat.
