= Spurfowl =

Spurfowl are two genera of birds:

- Galloperdix, from India and Sri Lanka
- Pternistis, from Africa
