= List of villages in Talagang District =

Villages in Talagang District

This is a list of villages in Talagang District, in the Punjab province of Pakistan.

A ا

- Adlaka ادلکہ
- Akwal اکوال

B ب

- Balwal بلوال
- Bilalbad بلال آباد
- Bhilomar بھلومار
- Bhagtal بھگٹال
- Budhial بڈھیال
- Banjar
- Bedhar

C چ

- Chinji چینجی

D د ڈ

- Dewal دیوال
- Danda Shah Bilawal دندہ شاہ بلاول
- Dharabi دھرابی
- Dhurnal ڈھرنال
- Dhermond
- Dhulliڈھلّی
- Dodial
- Darhalanwali
- Darot
- Dhok Doriyan
- Dhok Goria
- Dhok Hajian
- Dhok Usri
- Dhok Ujral
- Dhok Ramdyal
- Dhok Janwali
- Dhok Khanal
- Dhok Shah Nawaz
- Dhok Naushahri
- Dhok Detial
- Dhok Maghral
- Dhok Musa ڈھوک موسیٰ
- dhok daliڈھوک ڈالی
- dhok ikalasar ڈھوک اکلسر

- Dhok Pathan ڈھوک پٹھان

G ج

- Gungewali Dhok
- Gashral
- Gojwala

J ج

- Jhatla جھاٹلہ
- Jasialجشیال
- Jabbi Malikwaliجبّی ملکوالی

K خ ک

- Kot Sarang کوٹ سارنگ
- Kot Qazi کوٹ قاضی
- Kot Shera کوٹ شیرا
- Kot Shams کوٹ شمس
- Kot Gullah کوٹ گلہ
- Khuian کھوئیاں
- Khichhianکھچیاں
- Kumhari Dheriکمھاڑی ڈھیری
- Kohtehraکوٹیہری
- KhānewāliL ل
- Lawaلاوہ
- Letiلیٹی

M م

- Multan Khurd ملتان خورد
- Mamdot
- Malakwal ملکوال
- Mustafa Abad Mogla مصطفی آباد موگلا
- Mial میال
- Morat
- Murali

N ن

- Naka Kahoot نکہ کہوٹ

P پ

- Piera Fatehial پیڑہ فتحیال
- Pichand Town پچنند
- Pira Jangla پیڑہ جانگلہ
- Pachnand

* Patwali

- Raroti Dhok

S س ص

- Saghar سگھر
- Sangwala سگوالا
- Sadiqabad صادق آباد

T ت ٹ

- Tehti ٹہی
- Tamman ٹمن
- Thoa Mehrum Khan تھوہا محرم خان
- Taragkar
- Tarhada
- Kot Qazi کوٹ قازی

W و

- Wanhar ونہار
