= Dhulli =

Dhulli.
- Village & P.O. Dhulli, Tehsil & District: Talagang
- Location within Pakistan
- Coordinates: 32°52′0″N 72°12′0″E
- Country: Pakistan
- Province: Punjab
- District: Talagang
- Tehsil: Talagang
- Time zone: UTC+5 (PST)

Dhulli is a village of Tehsil and District Talagang in the Punjab province of Pakistan. It lies 25 km south-west of the town of Talagang on the Talagang-Mianwali road, and is 50 km from the M-2 motorway's Bulkasar Interchange.

Despite having status of a village, the settlement is pretty large, with the population close to 3,500 people, two large post offices, a few schools and a great number of mosques. The local community is very religious and traditional. The lifestyle is still based on the caste system.

== Geographic Information ==
UTM Easting	237,425.68
UTM Northing	3,639,689.71
UTM Zone	43S
Elevation (m)	485 m
Elevation (f)	1,591 feet

== Nearby airports ==
The nearest airports to Dhulli are:

Code	IATA	Name	City	Distance	Bearing
OPMI	MWD	Mianwali		36 nm W	240
OPRN	ISB	CHAKLALA	Islamabad	63 nm N	44
OPPS	PEW	PESHAWAR INTL	PESHAWAR	75 nm N	333
FR4410		Khewra		43 nm E	108
FR4378		Chashma		45 nm W	234
OPQS		Qasim		59 nm N	44

== Schools ==
- Government High School Dhulli (boys)
- Government Secondary School Dhulli (girls)
- Minhaj Public School Dhulli (private)
- Sir Syed Ideal School Dhulli English Medium (private)
- Govt Muktab School Dhulli

== Mosques ==
- Jam-e-Masjid Kadhay Wali (oldest mosque in the village)
- Jam-e-Masjid Darbal
- Masjid Mohalla Ghaziabad and Faisal Colony
- Jam-e-masjid Darbar sharif
- Jam-e-Masjid Ladhwal (old name is Toot Wali)
- Jam-e-Masjid Chishtia (previously Masjid Khansal)
- Jame-e-Masjid Mochi Wali (Munara Wali Masjid)
- Jame-e-Masjid Awasia (Adday Wali Masjid)
- Masjid Kabristan Wali jamia ashat ul quran
- Jame-e-Masjid toot wali
- Masjid Umair Sultan (Mohallah Wadhi)

== Major castes ==
The following are the major castes of Dhulli:

- Darbal
- Fateh Khanal
- Mherkhnal
- Khansal
- Khannal
- Qutbal
- Ishral
- Ladhwal
- Kulyal
- Tural
- Roshnal
- Jindwal
- Imral

== Dhokes (sub-villages) ==
Following are the dhokes of Dhulli:

- Dhoke Summandri
- Dhoke Chhoee
- Dhoke Bhirra
- Dhoke Burrala
- Dhoke Pindian
- Dhoke Barrimala
- Dhoke Modimaar
- Dhoke sohlewali
- Dhoke Nakka
- Dhoke Nari
- Dhoke Goje wali (Malik Mohammad Hanif)
- Dhoke Padhi near alfalah ground
- Dhoke Khatti
- Dhoke chaphr
- Dhoke Wanhar
- Dhoke Shamial
