= Akwal =

Village in Punjab, Pakistan

Akwal اکوال
- Village in Talagang
- Interactive map of Akwal
- Country: Pakistan
- Province: Punjab
- District: Talagang
- Postal code: 48060

Akwal (Urdu:اکوال ) is a village and one of the 23 union councils of Talagang District in the Punjab Province of Pakistan. It is part of Talagang Tehsil and located 4 km from Talagang city. Its population is 9,847.
