= Fateh Mohammad Malik =

Indian writer (born 1936)

Fateh Muhammad Malik
- فتح محمد ملک
- Born: 1936 (age 89–90); Village Tehi, Talagang, Punjab Province, British India (now in Talagang District, Pakistan)
- Education: Gordon College
- Occupations: Critic and scholar
- Children: Tariq Malik
- Writing career
- Language: Urdu, English
- Notable works: Iqbal's reconstruction of Muslim political thought Iqbal Inspired Humour: A Note on Parodies by Selected Urdu Poets; Saadat Hassan Manto ek nai taabeer Ahmed Nadeem Qasmi shair aur afsana nigar
- Notable awards: Sitara-i-Imtiaz (Star of Excellence) Award by the President of Pakistan in 2006

Fateh Muhammad Malik, (Urdu: فتح محمد ملک ALA-LC: born 1936) is a Pakistani literary critic, linguist and scholar. He has authored several books including an essay "Iqbal Inspired Humour: A Note on Parodies by Selected Urdu Poets" published in Of Clowns and Gods, Brahmans and Babus - Humour in South Asian Literatures.

Iqbal had a key influence on Malik and he wrote at least six books on him including Iqbal's reconstruction of Muslim political thought, published by University of Leicester, England. His major work while working for National Language Authority was a five-volume book on the origin of Urdu as a language.

== Early life and education ==
Fateh Muhammad Malik was born on June 18, 1936, in the village of Tehi near Talagang, Punjab region of British India (now Talagang District, Punjab, Pakistan). He grew up in a modest household where his father worked as a schoolteacher, and education was highly valued.

He received his early education at a government school in Talagang, later attending Government College Attock and earning a master's degree in Urdu literature from Gordon College, Rawalpindi, where he was awarded a gold medal for academic distinction.

In his autobiography, Aashiyana-i-Ghurbat Se Ashiyan Dar Ashiyan (2023), Malik recounts his early struggles and achievements, emphasizing the challenges of growing up in an underdeveloped area with limited academic opportunities.

== Political career ==
From a young age, Malik was politically conscious; at the age of ten, he supported the Muslim League, even though most people in his area favored the Indian National Congress. This political awareness deeply influenced his lifelong engagement with the ideas of Allama Iqbal and the ideological basis of Pakistan.

Later, Malik would get close to Zulfikar Ali Bhutto, who personally requested him to edit the daily Mussawaat around the 1970 general election, both sharing the common ideology of Islamic socialism, while later Malik would become a press secretary to Hanif Ramay, also a PPP politician and the Chief Minister of Punjab for 1974-1975.

== Academic career ==
Malik began writing literary criticism in 1961, contributing to respected Urdu journals such as Humayun and Mehr-i-Neemroz. Inspired by prominent critics like Hasan Askari and Saleem Ahmed, he developed a distinct critical voice.

He's the chairman of the National Language Authority. He served as Rector of the International Islamic University, Islamabad until 2012 when he was sacked by then President Zardari under pressureof from the Saudi government. Before being sacked from his post, he criticized Saudi Arabia's practices as uncivilized and anti-women during a seminar.

He also served this university as a dean of the faculty of languages, literature and humanities.

Before starting his career in Pakistan, he taught at Columbia University, Heidelberg University, Humboldt University and Saint Petersburg University for ten years.

== Tributes ==
In 2025, three published books—one in English and two in Urdu—honored Malik’s literary and ideological contributions as he neared his nineties: the English volume, Prof Fateh Muhammad Malik: An Ideological Literary Critic, edited by Dr. Saeed Shafqat, included 40 essays and interviews by noted scholars; the Urdu books, Fateh Muhammad Malik Ki Tanqeed Nigari, edited by Dr. Nisar Turabi, and another compiled by Syed Roohul Ameen, featured critical essays by prominent literary figures assessing Malik’s work and thought. Together, these publications celebrated his lasting influence on Pakistani literary criticism.

== Awards and recognition ==
- Sitara-i-Imtiaz Award (Star of Excellence) by the President of Pakistan in 2006
- Presidential Iqbal Award
