= Markhal, Talagang =

Village in Punjab, Pakistan

Coordinates: 33°07′N 72°13′E

Markhal مرکھل
- Country: Pakistan
- Province: Punjab
- District: Talagang
- Tehsil: Talagang
- Time zone: UTC+5

Markhal is a village located in the Talagang District of Punjab, Pakistan. Situated on the left bank of the Soan River near the Qavala Nullah, Markhal is widely recognized for its historical architecture, traditional stonework, and Sufi shrines.

== Etymology and geography ==
Markhal is positioned approximately 42 kilometres northwest of Talagang town. The settlement rests in a picturesque valley surrounded by rugged hills, with the Soan River flowing along its backdrop. The terrain features traditional mud-plastered houses juxtaposed against the natural topography of the Pothohar region. Administratively, the village is part of the Talagang District, having previously been governed under the Chakwal District prior to the establishment of Talagang District.

== History and demographics ==
The Awan tribe forms the demographic majority in the village, alongside a small community of Gilani Sadat households. Historically, Markhal has maintained deep cultural and spiritual ties with the broader Pothohar landscape, characterized by indigenous craftsmanship and traditional community structures.

== Architecture and heritage ==
=== Jamia Masjid Noorani ===
The Jamia Masjid Noorani stands as the oldest mosque in the village, originally established around the time of Markhal's founding. The structure underwent significant reconstruction and expansion around 1930 under the guidance of local masons Mistri Mian Muhammad and Mistri Baba Gul Muhammad. Dressed stone used for the rebuild was quarried from the nearby Markhal hill from a site locally known as Kali Watey Wali Jagah, with villagers actively participating in transporting the building materials.

While much of the building has been renovated, the western boundary wall preserves original masonry consisting of dressed and undressed stone slabs. The mosque also retains one of its original wooden doors featuring intricate geometric and floral carvings, including bell-shaped patterns on the upper panels typical of pre-Partition Pothohari architecture.

=== Village Cemetery and Stonework ===
The historic village cemetery, situated near the Government Girls' Elementary School, contains numerous carved tombstones and cenotaphs crafted by local artisans such as Mistri Mian Muhammad, Mistri Baba Gul Muhammad, and Mistri Nur Akhmat. These gravestones feature geometric motifs alongside symbolic engravings such as prayer rugs (musalla), ewers (lota), and carved combs on women's graves.

== Culture and sports ==
The village has a rich tradition of indigenous sports, particularly kabaddi. Markhal has produced notable athletes, including traditional kabaddi players such as Baba Sanwal Khan and Malik Jehangir Khan.
