= Pira Jangla =

Village in Punjab, Pakistan

Pira Jangla پیڑہ جانگلہ
- Village in Talagang
- Interactive map of Pira Jangla
- Coordinates: 32°59′23″N 72°27′22″E
- Country: Pakistan
- Province: Punjab
- District: Talagang

Pira Jangla (Urdu: پیڑہ جانگلہ) is a village and union council of Talagang District in the Punjab province of Pakistan. It is part of Talagang Tehsil and located 11 km north of the city of Talagang.
