= Rupwal =

Town in Chakwal, Punjab, Pakistan

Coordinates: 33°03′N 72°32′E

Rupwal (or Roopwal) is one of the oldest and historic towns of Chakwal District in the Punjab Province of Pakistan.

Rupwal was a "Ghalla Mandi" (grain market) 100 years ago and there was also a defence road from Rawalpindi to Talagang which is no longer able to use. It was also well known for dog fighting & Kabaddi 30 years ago. It is located north west of the district Chakwal, Chakwal Talagang Road, insert a Link Road of Balkaser, distance of 25&23 km (two different routes can be used) and other Link Road "Dharrabi Village" Distance of 13 km. Distance from Islamabad (Capital) is about 105 km East-West and about 25 km from "Neela Dulha" interchange via towns "Dulha, Bhagwal, Chakwal". Present MNA NA-59 "Sardar Ghulam Abbas" is from Kot Choudharian which is mostly and locally called as "KOT ROOPWAL".
