= Dhermond =

Village in Punjab, Pakistan

Dhermond (ڈھیرمونڈ)
- Village in Talagang
- Interactive map of Dhermond (ڈھیرمونڈ)
- Coordinates: 32°56′41″N 72°10′11″E
- Country: Pakistan
- Province: Punjab
- District: Talagang

Dhermond is a village and union council of the Talagang Tehsil, Talagang District, Punjab Province, Pakistan. It is approximately 25 km west of Talagang city.
