= Chinji National Park =

National park in Punjab, Pakistan

- IUCN category II (national park)
- Location within Pakistan
- Location: Talagang, Salt Range, Punjab, Pakistan
- Nearest city: Jhalta
- Coordinates: 33°0′36.87″N 72°29′30.98″E
- Area: 60.95 km^{2} (23.53 sq mi)
- Elevation: 2,231 ft (680 m)
- Established: 1987
- Visitors: 2000 - 5000
- Governing body: Wildlife and Parks Department, Government of Punjab (Pakistan)

Chinji National Park (shortened as Chinji), established in 1987, is a protected area of IUCN category II (national park) located on Sargodha road near Chinji town in District Talagang, Punjab, Pakistan. The national park covers a total area of 6,095 hectares (15,061 acres). Chinji National Park is located close to the Salt Range, and about 130 km from Islamabad in the south.

== Landscape ==
The area has an elevation imperial of 2,231 feet (680 m). Deeply eroded land of Chinji consists of sandstone to igneous rocks, combined with small deposits of rock salt from the Salt Range. Deep torrential streams and ravines slope into the Soan River, which passes through the area.

== Climate ==
Chinji National Park
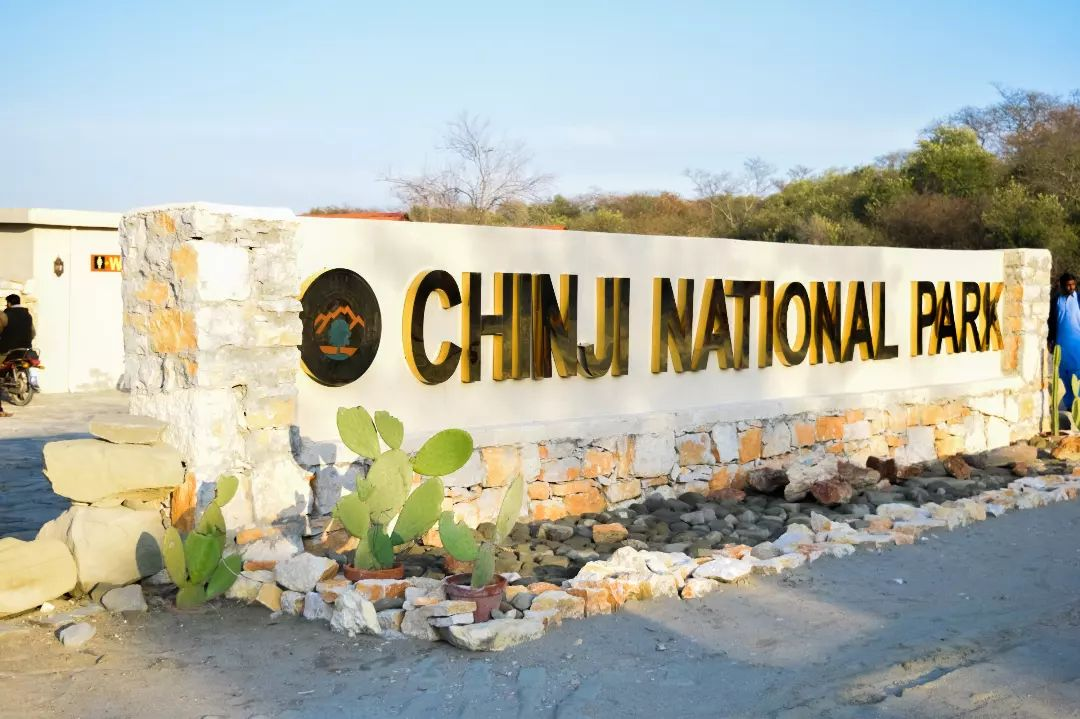
- Chinji National Park In 2023

Boxing career

Average annual rainfall in the area is 537 mm, out of which 308 mm is in the monsoon season from July to September. Maximum temperature is 27 °C in June and minimum is 2.2 °C in January. Frost is common in winter season. Relative humidity can reach up to 80% in monsoon.

== Wildlife ==
The Chinji National Park exhibits the biome of deserts and xeric shrublands and falls in the ecoregion of '(Baluchistan xeric woodlands' PA1307). The area is characterized to have sub-tropical vegetation with many plant species of importance. Notable mammals found here include the Punjab urial, Golden jackal, Bengal fox, Indian wolf and Indian pangolin. A few game birds include Grey francolin and Common wood pigeon

== Fauna and flora ==
List of fauna found in the national park.

Mammals

#	Name	Scientific name	Picture
1	Brandt's hedgehog	Paraechinus hypomelas	
2	Asian house shrew	Suncus murinus	
3	Indian bush rat	Golunda ellioti	
4	Northern palm squirrel	Funambulus pennantii	
5	Yellow-throated marten	Martes flavigula	
6	Indian pangolin	Manis crassicaudata	
7	Bengal fox	Vulpes bengalensis	
8	Red fox	Vulpes vulpes	
9	Indian wolf	Canis lupus pallipes	
10	Small Indian civet	Small Indian civet	
11	Indian long-eared hedgehog	Hemiechinus collaris	
12	Indian crested porcupine	Hystrix indica	
13	Black rat	Rattus rattus	
14	House mouse	Mus musculus	
15	Indian grey mongoose	Urva edwardsii	
16	Small Indian mongoose	Urva auropunctata	
17	Indian jackal	Canis aureus indicus	
18	Jungle cat	Felis chaus	
19	Asiatic wildcat	Felis lybica ornata	
20	Punjab urial	Ovis vignei punjabiensis	

Reptiles

#	Name	Scientific name	Picture
1	Bengal monitor	Varanus bengalensis	
2	Yellow-belly gecko	Hemidactylus flaviviridis	
3	Oriental garden lizard	Calotes versicolor	

Birds

#	Name	Scientific name	Picture
1	Chukar partridge	Alectoris chukar	
2	See-see partridge	Ammoperdix griseogularis	
3	Grey francolin	Ortygornis pondicerianus	
4	Common quail	Coturnix coturnix	
5	Rock dove	Columba livia	
6	Black-winged stilt	Himantopus himantopus	
7	Laughing dove	Spilopelia senegalensis	
8	Red-wattled lapwing	Vanellus indicus	
9	Greater coucal	Centropus sinensis	
10	White-throated kingfisher	Halcyon smyrnensis	
11	Red-vented bulbul	Pycnonotus cafer	
12	Black-winged kite	Elanus caeruleus	
13	Black kite	Milvus migrans	
14	Eurasian teal	Anas crecca	
15	Common pochard	Aythya ferina	

== See also ==
- List of national parks of Pakistan
- Salt Range
