= Musawir Munir =

Pakistani artist

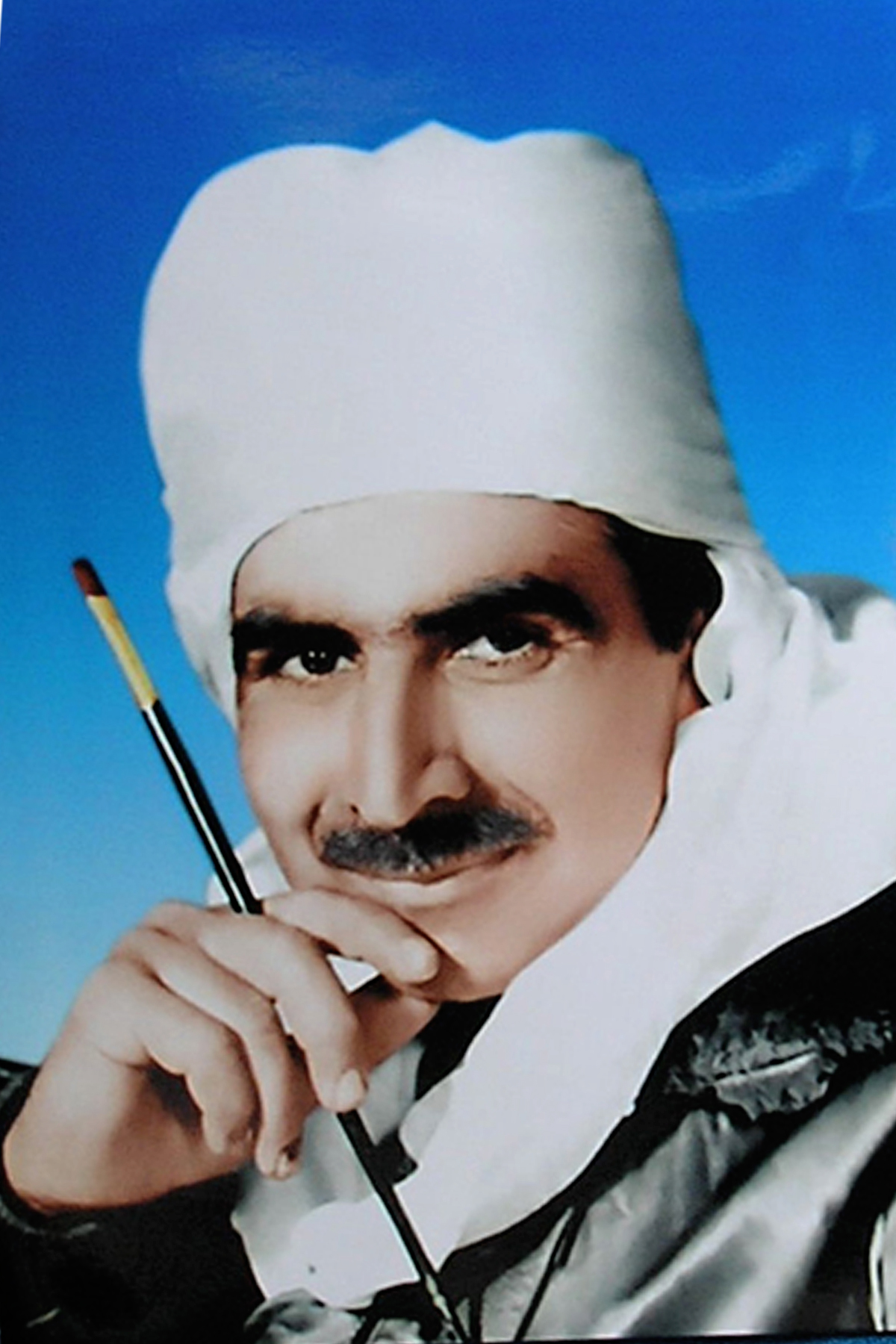
- Born: 15 December 1955
- Died: 26 January 2025 (aged 69); Dhurnal
- Known for: Painting
- Website: http://munirarts.org/

Musawir Munir (15 Dec 1955 - 26 Jan 2025) is a Pakistani artist. He was born in Dhurnal, a village of Talagang in the province of Punjab. Munir paints with both hands.

He devoted himself to the cause of “Peace and Love” throughout the world. The main theme of his paintings are landscapes, artistic lettering, international problems, women's issues, and Pakistan regional culture.

Artist Munir Dharnal participated in an international exhibition at the Royal Academy of London in 1993 and succeeded in winning the 'Asia Award' from Singapore. In 2001, he secured first place in the 'Konica Centuria' global competition held in Japan, bringing honor to himself and his country, Pakistan; the General Manager of Konica Laboratories awarded him a prize of seven hundred dollars. On August 21, 2006, the Government of Pakistan honored him with a gold medal.
