= Nala Ankar Bridge =

Bridge in Talagang, Pakistan

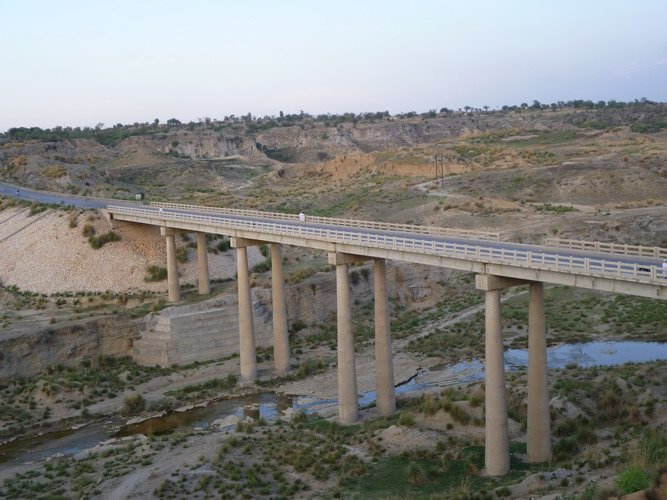

Nala Ankar Bridge is a road bridge in Talagang District in Pakistan's Punjab Province. It crosses the Nala Ankar (Ankar stream), and is situated about 7–10 kilometres (4.3–6.2 mi) apart (between Saghar and Dhok Phulari) from Talagang on the Mianwali Road.

== History ==
It was built during the government of General Musharaf and Chief Minister of the Punjab Ch. Parvez Elahi.

This bridge was developed due to public protests against accidents on the Nala Ankar turn.
