= Dhurnal =

Dhurnal ڈھرنال
- Location in Pakistan
- Coordinates: 32°48′0″N 72°6′0″E
- Country: Pakistan
- Province: Punjab
- District: Talagang District
- Prepartition: Campbell Pur
- Established: 500BC
- Founder: Dharnal
- Seat: Chairman Union Council

Government 2013-2018
  - Type: Union Council
  - Chairman / Nazim: Qazi Ghulam Yaseen (late)

Area
  - Urban: 5.4 sq mi (14 km^{2})
  - Metro: 2.7 sq mi (7 km^{2})
- Time zone: UTC+5 (PST)
  - Summer (DST): +6
- Postal code: 48210
- Area code: 0543
- Vehicle registration: CHB, CHD, CHK
- Website: https://facebook.com/DhurnalCity

Dhurnal is a town of Tehsil Lawa, Talagang District in Punjab, Pakistan. It is located at 32°47'60N 72°5'60E.

== Education Hub ==
=== Universities ===
Allama Iqbal Open University (AIOU) has an office near Dhurnal close to Rati Dheri. The first private school to be established in this Area was Zia Academy in 1992.This paved the way for other "private" schools.

== See also ==
- Talagang
