= Leti, Chakwal =

Coordinates: 32°55′0″N 72°4′0″E

Leti, Punjab
- Village and union council
- Interactive map of Leti, Punjab
- Country: Pakistan
- Province: Punjab
- District: Talagang
- Tehsil: Lawa

Government
- Time zone: UTC+5 (PST)
- 48190: 48190

Leti is a village in District Talagang of the Punjab Province, Pakistan. The name is derived from a shallow water stream.

== Government ==
Leti is a union council, an administrative subdivision, of Talagang District, and is part of Lawa Tehsil.

== Economy ==
The village is located in an agricultural area that primarily grows wheat, cotton, rice, and corn. In order to be more productive, recommendations by Muhammad Aslam from the Sarhad Journal of Agriculture, (Dec 2016, vol 32,4 p. 258-423) include, in part, education through training and extension services, improving irrigation water management, reclamation of salinised land, and new price policies.this village is famous for using solar panels for water pumps. Olso famous for creating small dambs.

== Culture ==
Leti is famous for its local sport called kabaddi, a contact team sport involving tagging out opposing team players within the time it takes to hold a breath. Leti is also famous for its bull races.
