= Tariq Malik =

Pakistani government official

Chairman NADRA
- In office 22 June 2021 – 13 June 2023
- President: Arif Alvi
- Prime Minister: Imran Khan

Chief Technical Advisor United Nations Development Programme
- In office January 2017 – August 2021

Senior Technical Consultant World Bank
- In office March 2016 – February 2017

Senior Industry Consultant - Government Systems Teradata
- In office May 2014 – February 2016

Chairman NADRA
- In office 17 June 2012 – 10 January 2014

Deputy Chairman NADRA
- In office 2008–2012

Personal details
- Born: Village Tehi, Talagang, Pakistan
- Parent: Fateh Mohammad Malik (father)
- Education: Schiller International University (M.A); Quaid-i-Azam University (M.A); Harvard Kennedy School; Stanford University
- Nickname: Man on a mission

Tariq Malik is a Technical Advisor of the World Bank, advising countries on Digital Public Infrastructure (DPI), Digital ID and Identification for Development (ID4D Program). Prior to this, he was serving as the Chairman NADRA since 22 June 2021 for the second time, until he resigned on 13 June 2023 citing political polarization and instability. Malik served as Chief Technical Advisor in United Nations Development Program (UNDP), where he advised member states on Digital Governance, and Legal ID though the lens of Sustainable Development Goals (SDGs).

Tariq Malik made headlines when he tendered a bold resignation to then Prime Minister of Pakistan, Shahbaz Sharif on June 13. His resignation became popular worldwide, as it exposed the polarization and institutional capture. Center for Global Development captured the policy lessons.

Tariq first made headlines when he addressed the opposition's request for validation of the 2013 Pakistani general election. He confirmed that thumb impression verification using the Biometric System could determine the fairness of the elections. Shortly after, Tariq faced an unjust dismissal by Nawaz Sharifs government for his actions but was immediately reinstated by the Islamabad High Court within a few hours.

== Early life ==
His father is a famous writer, and author of 34+ books on literature, and South Asian Studies, Professor Fateh Mohammad Malik.

== Education ==
Malik holds master's degrees in both International Management from the Heidelberg Germany and Computer Science from Quaid-i-Azam University. He obtained his bachelor's degree in Mathematics and Statistics from University of Punjab. He was trained at the Harvard Kennedy School and received a diploma in project management from Stanford University.

== Career ==
Tariq served as Chairman NADRA from June 2021 to June 2023. He served as Chief Technical Advisor at the United Nations Development Program January 2017 - August 2021, Senior Technical Consultant at the World Bank from March 2016 - February 2017, and Senior Industry Consultant Government Systems from May 2014 - February 2016. He served as Chairman NADRA from 2012 to 2014, and Deputy Chairman/Head of Technology from 2008 to 2012 at NADRA. During Ed McNamar and then Robert Ficano administration, he served as Deputy Chief Information Officer in Wayne County, Michigan, for over 10 years (1998-2008), and developed online Property Tax System. Before then he served as Senior Consultant in Information Systems for the government of Bahrain.

His name was included in the Top 25 ID Experts by Okta. Tariq was honored by his snapshot shown at Times Square on NASDAQ Screen on May 4, 2026. His name was also included in the World's 100 Most Influential People in 'Digital Government' by a European think tank known as "Apolitical". He was also named among the Top 100 Digital Influencers in the 'Digital Community' by One World Identity, a New York-based independent identity research and strategy think tank focused on cyber security, digital commerce and risk management. Before joining the World Bank, Malik helped governments to optimize use of Big Data and advanced data analytics from the platform of Teradata Inc. USA.

== 2013 Pakistani general election incident ==
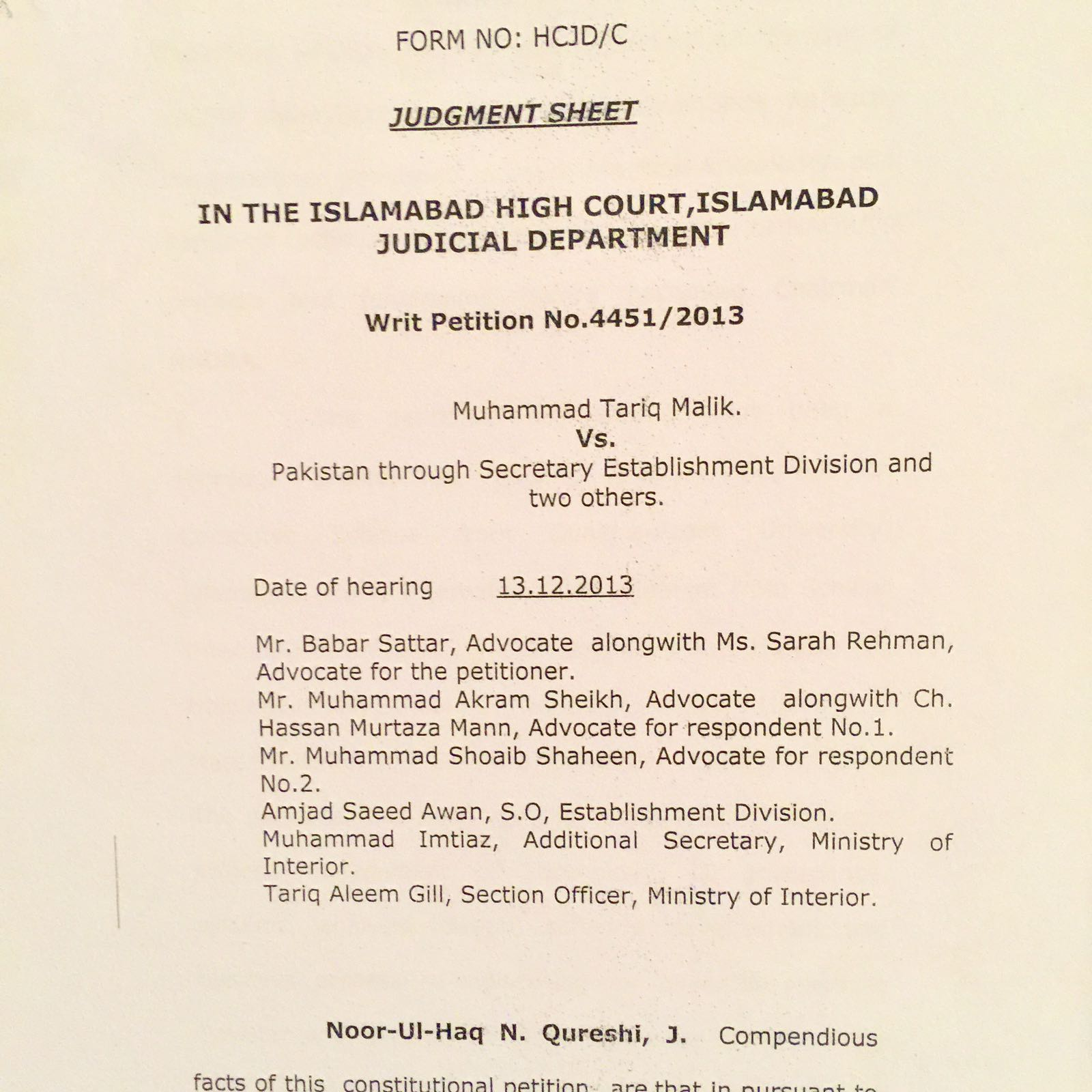
Islamabad High Court verdict reinstating Malik as Chairman NADRA on 13 December 2013

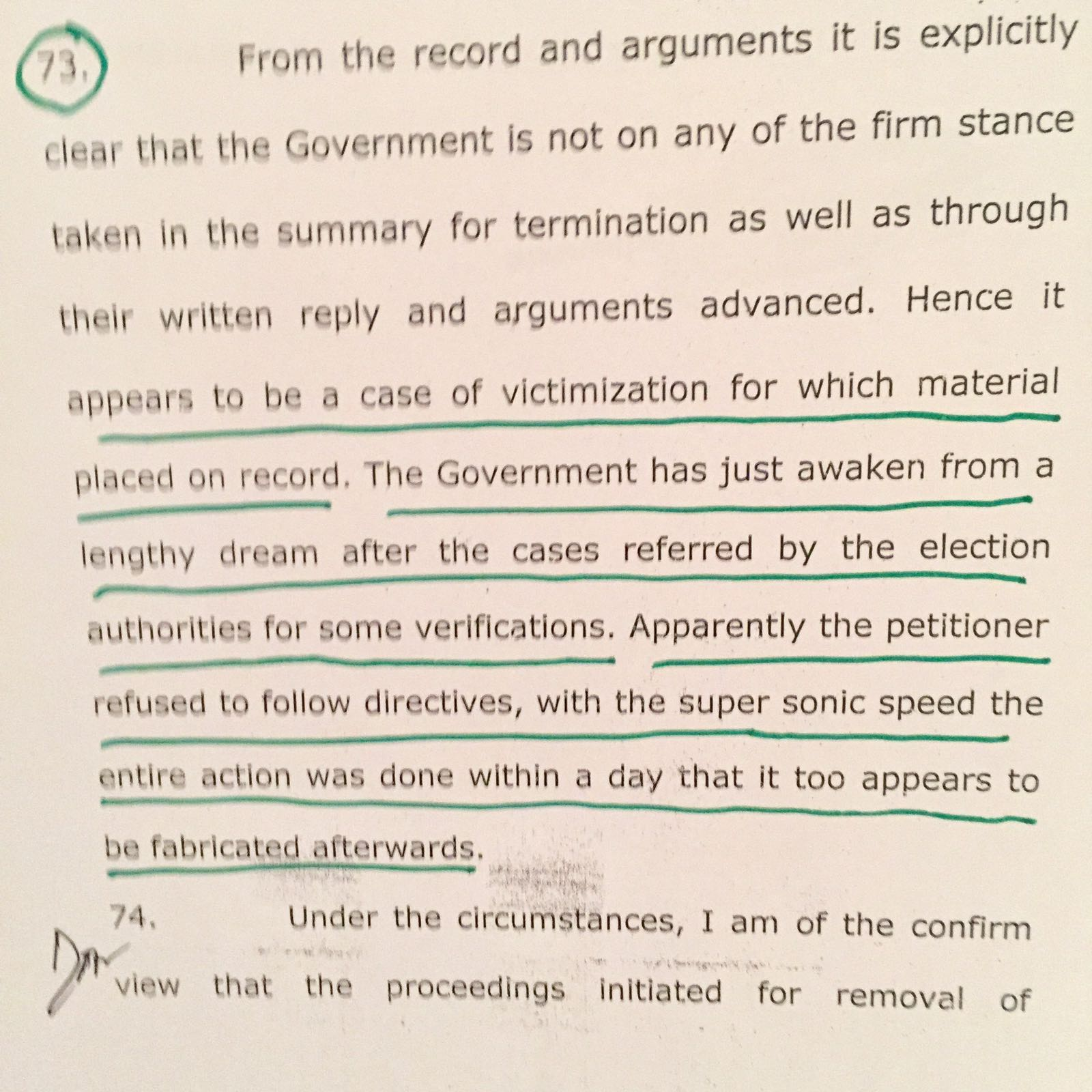
Page 2

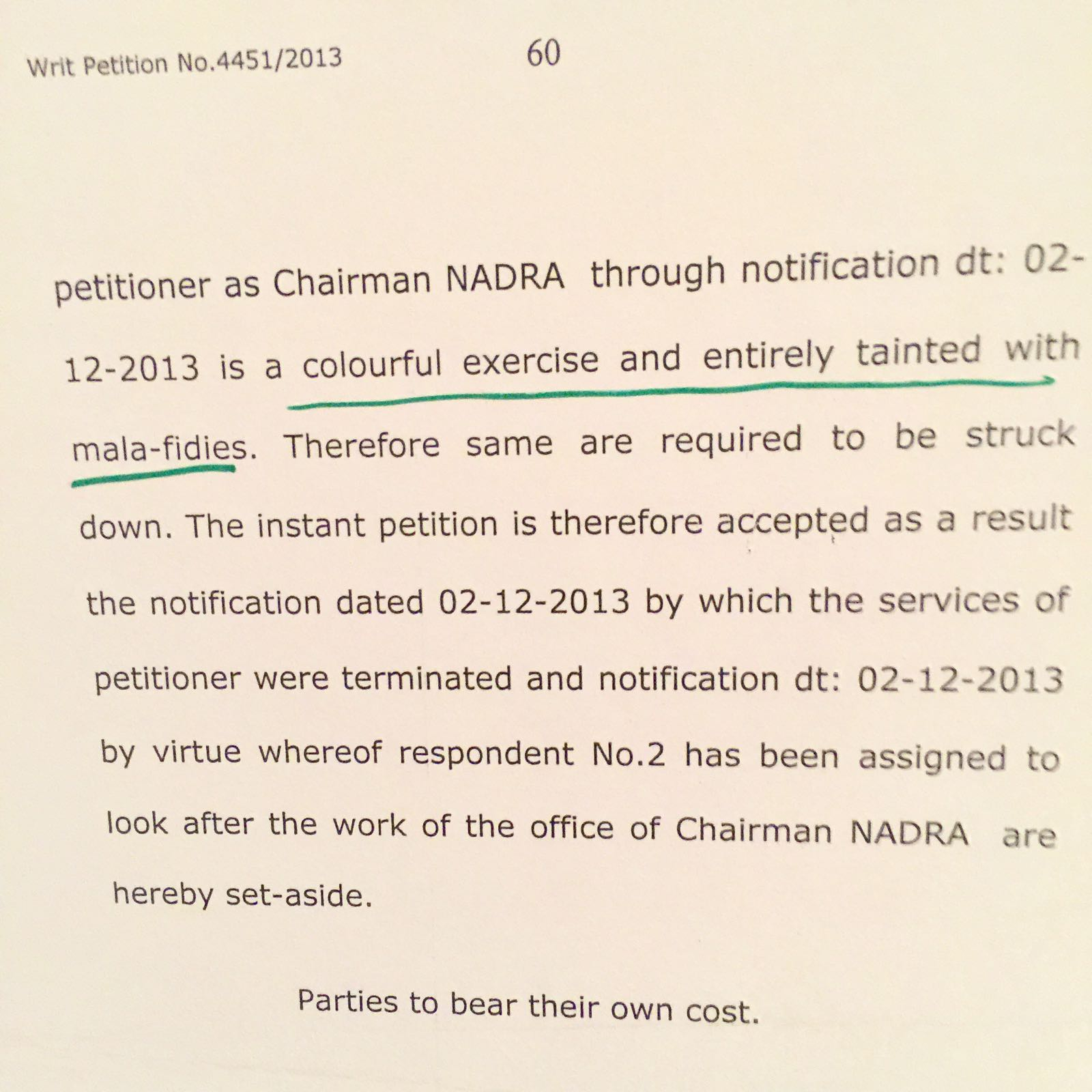
Page 3

In his first term serving as Chairperson of NADRA, he confirmed that the opposition's demand to verify if the 2013 Pakistani general elections were free and fair, is possible through thumb impression verification using the Biometric System.

A source close to NADRA's office stated that Rana Sanaullah (who was Home Minister first and then Minister of Law & Justice later) asked Tariq to compromise on the thumb impressions' verification and provide a clean chit to the PML-N candidate. Reportedly Malik resisted and stood by principles of honesty and integrity. Sanaullah warned that if Malik failed to comply, he would face consequences.

He was then terminated from his position without any reason by Nawaz Sharif and his government. However, he was immediately restored as Chairman NADRA by the Islamabad High Court. Despite being restored as chairman, he later resigned alleging that he had been threatened with the kidnapping of him and his family by those who did not want the election process verified. In its judgement, the Superior court of Pakistan instead issued a charge sheet against the government for intimidating, victimizing harassing and frightening him of consequences.

Some writers and analysts called this blatant act of government as e-bullying.

== Later work ==
Malik worked on a multi-biometric system resulting in the registration of more than 200 million citizens along their associated biometric attributes. CNN called him ‘Man on mission’ when he identified 3.5 million tax evaders in Pakistan using ‘Data Analytics’ coupled with biometrics. Tariq led similar projects and development-based interventions in the USA, Kenya, Nigeria, Sri Lanka, Bahrain, Bangladesh, Russia, Zambia, Madagascar, Mozambique, Liberia, Gambia, Namibia, Malawi and Tanzania. Malawi ID Project was recognized as one of the Top 5 best-managed government digital transformation projects globally (WSIS Award).

He helped various institutions of United Nations (UNHCR, ICAO, UNDP) and World Bank (Poverty Score Card, BISP, Disaster Management and ID Ecosystem), to accomplish development goals with transparency. Prior to that, he served as Deputy CIO in Wayne County, State of Michigan, where he led the design, development and implementation of an online Property Tax System.

Throughout his career, Malik has helped governments to improve service delivery using innovative technologies. Result-based achievements earned him various national and international awards. The state of Pakistan conferred the highest award in Technology – The ‘Star of Excellence’ (Sitara-e-Imtiaz) 2013 for using technology to improve governance. Malik won Teradata’s 2012 national ‘CIO of the Year’ award and was recognized at the 2009 ID World International Congress in Italy as the recipient of the ‘Outstanding Achievement Award’ for his work as an international biometrics leader. Malik's articles are published in publications such as Project Syndicate, CGD, Forbes.

=== Resignation ===
On 13 June 2023, he resigned from his post as Chairman NADRA citing political instability.
