= Tahi =

Tahi may refer to:

- Naufahu Tahi (1981-), a retired American football fullback
- Tahi Reihana (1972-), a former professional Australian Rugby League footballer
- 'Ikale Tahi, nickname of the Tonga national rugby union team
- Tahi FM, a Māori radio station in Tauranga on 98.2 FM, launched in 2003
- Tahi, Pakistan, a town in Chakwal District
