= Bhagtal =

Bhagtal بھگٹال
- Location within Punjab, Pakistan Location within Pakistan
- Coordinates: 32.8386°N 72.2199°E
- Country: Pakistan
- Province: Punjab
- Division: Rawalpindi
- District: Talagang
- Time zone: UTC+5 (PST)
- +543: 48100
- Website: http://www.bhagtal.webs.com

Bhagtal (Urdu: بھگٹال) Dhoke Khabarri is a village of Talagang District, in Punjab, Pakistan. It is located 25 km from Talagang city on Talagang-Mianwali Road. It resides a population of approximately 15,000. The people are generally government servants and farmers by profession. Majority of the population is Awan by caste.

== Language ==
Punjabi is the main language of Bhagtal.
