= Dhoular =

- Village and union council
- Interactive map of Dhoular
- Country: Pakistan
- Province: Punjab
- District: Talagang
- Tehsil: Talagang
- Time zone: UTC+5 (PST)

Dhoular is a village and union council of Talagang District in the Punjab Province of Pakistan, and is part of Talagang Tehsil.

According to the 1998 census of Pakistan, its total population was about 6,500. It is one of the oldest, largest and culturally rich village of the area, and is referred to, in the famous saying: The Sword is in Dhoular (meaning "it is the time to fight but my ammunition is not with me, rather I had left that at home"). It is a part of the Pothohar Plateau and is a fertile area however there is no irrigation system available in the entire Rawalpindi Division.

By its area, Dhoular is the second largest village in the Tehsil. It is also well known for its unique breeds of racing bulls. The village’s primary agricultural produce includes wheat, peanuts, and black peas.
