= Piera Fatehial =

- Village and union council
- Country: Pakistan
- Province: Punjab
- District: Talagang
- Time zone: UTC+5 (PST)

Piera Fatehial is a village and union council of Talagang District in the Punjab Province of Pakistan. It is a village of Talagang Tehsil. The word "Pira" is from Pothari, meaning sitting or chair, while "Fatehial" is a clan of the Awan Tribe.

The village is around 15 km from Talagang city. Its population is more than 10,000, and it is one of the most educated village in the area. It has a fresh water canal which is in some places especially near the village 300 ft down from the ground level which make it same like a valley that is in some places 1 km in width. It is the picnic place in the area and is surrounded by green small hills. It has 2 small dams. It is known for its ground nuts.
