= Jabbi Shah Dilawar =

Jabbi Shah Dilawar جبی شاہ دلاور
- Jabbi Shah Dilawar
- Nickname: Jabbi
- Location in Pakistan
- Coordinates: 33°5′36″N 71°59′29″E
- Country: Pakistan
- Province: Punjab
- District: Talagang
- Time zone: UTC+5 (PST)
  - Summer (DST): +6
- Postal code: 48020
- Area code: 543 for PTCL

Jabbi Shah Dilawar is a village and union council of Talagang District in the Punjab Province of Pakistan, it is part of Talagang Tehsil. Jabbi Shah Dilawar (postal code 48020) has two gvernment and two private school and over 10 mosque. Its population is more than 10,000 including urban (Dhoke) and is located at 33°5'36N 71°59'29E.
