= Naka Kahoot =

Nakka Kahut نکہ کہوٹ
- Village and union council
- Country: Pakistan
- Province: Punjab
- District: Talagang
- Tehsil: Talagnag
- Time zone: UTC+5 (PST)

Nakka Kahut is a village and union council of Talagang District in the Punjab Province of Pakistan. It is part of Talagang Tehsil. The village gets its name from the Kahut tribe, who make up the majority of the population.
