= Bilalabad =

Village in Punjab, Pakistan

Bilalabad بلال آباد
- Village in Talagang
- Country: Pakistan
- Province: Punjab
- District: Talagang
- Postal code: 48140

Bilalabad (Urdu:بلال آباد ) is a village and one of the union councils of Talagang District in the Punjab Province of Pakistan. Its population is 8,000
