= Common partridge =

Common partridge is a common name for several birds and may refer to:

- Coqui francolin, in Africa
- Grey partridge, in Eurasia
