= Malakwal, Talagang =

Village in Punjab, Pakistan

Malakwal (ملکوال)
- Village
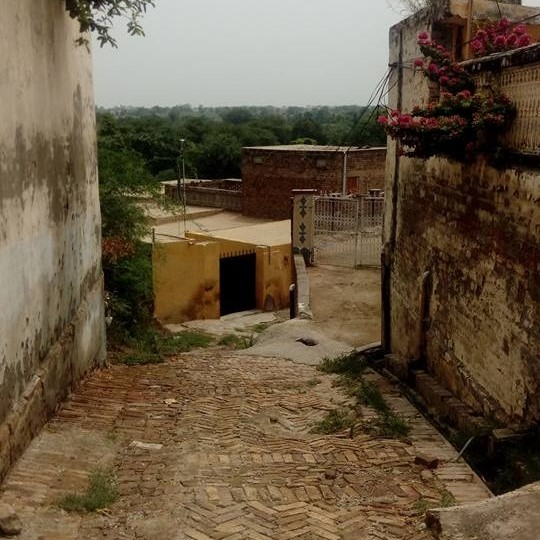

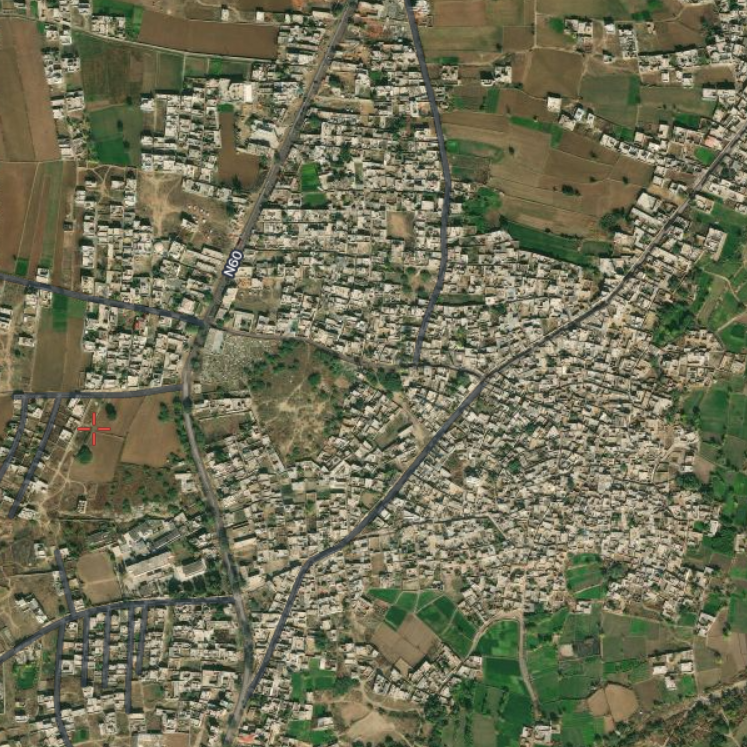
- Coordinates: 32°55′40″N 72°24′40″E
- Country: Pakistan
- Province: Punjab
- District: Talagang

Area
  - Total: 1.1 km^{2} (0.42 sq mi)
  - Rank: 2nd

Population
  - Total: 19,109
- Time zone: UTC+5 (PST)
- Postal code: 48101

Malakwal is a village and union council of Pakistan of the Talagang District in the Punjab Province of Pakistan. It is part of Talagang Tehsil. Malakwal, the second largest village of the district, has a population of 19,109 in 3,082 households. Malakwal is situated near Talagang city and the locality Dhok Goria.
