= Chakwalian =

Village in Punjab, Pakistan

Chakwalian چکوالیاں
- Village
- Location in Pakistan
- Coordinates: 32°49′41″N 72°27′37″E
- Country: Pakistan
- Region: Punjab
- District: Chakwal
- Time zone: UTC+5 (PST)

Chakwalian (Urdu: چکوالیاں) is a village and union council of Chakwal District in the Punjab Province of Pakistan. It is part of Talagang Tehsil.
