= Ghabir Dam =

Dam in Pakistan

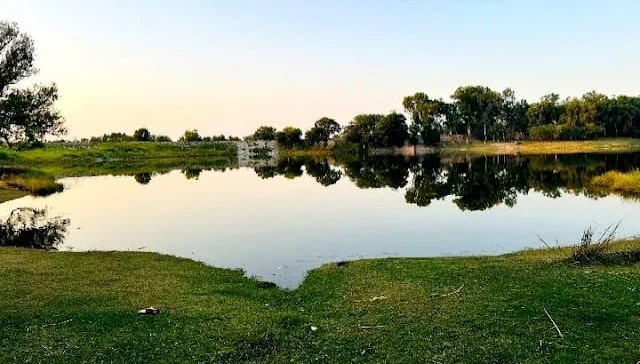
- Location: On the border of Talagang and Mianwali districts, Punjab, Pakistan
- Status: Operational
- Opening date: 2014

Ghabir Dam is located on the border of Talagang District and Mianwali District in the Punjab province of Pakistan. Completed in 2014, the dam it has quickly become a popular tourist destination due to its stunning scenery and serene atmosphere. Ghabir Dam is located about 150 kilometers from Islamabad and Rawalpindi.
