= Surhali =

Pakistani village

Surhali Surhali, Chakwal, Pakistan
- Village
- Surhali,سنگوالہ
- Sangwala, Chakwal, Pakistan Surhali (Pakistan)
- Coordinates: 33.025047°N 72.061215°E
- Country: Pakistan
- Region: Punjab Province
- District: Chakwal District
- Tehsil: Talagang

Population
  - Total: Above 8,000
- Time zone: UTC+5 (PST)
- Area code: 0543

Surhali (Urdu: سنگوالہ) is a village in Pakistan, located in Chakwal District of Punjab, Pakistan.
