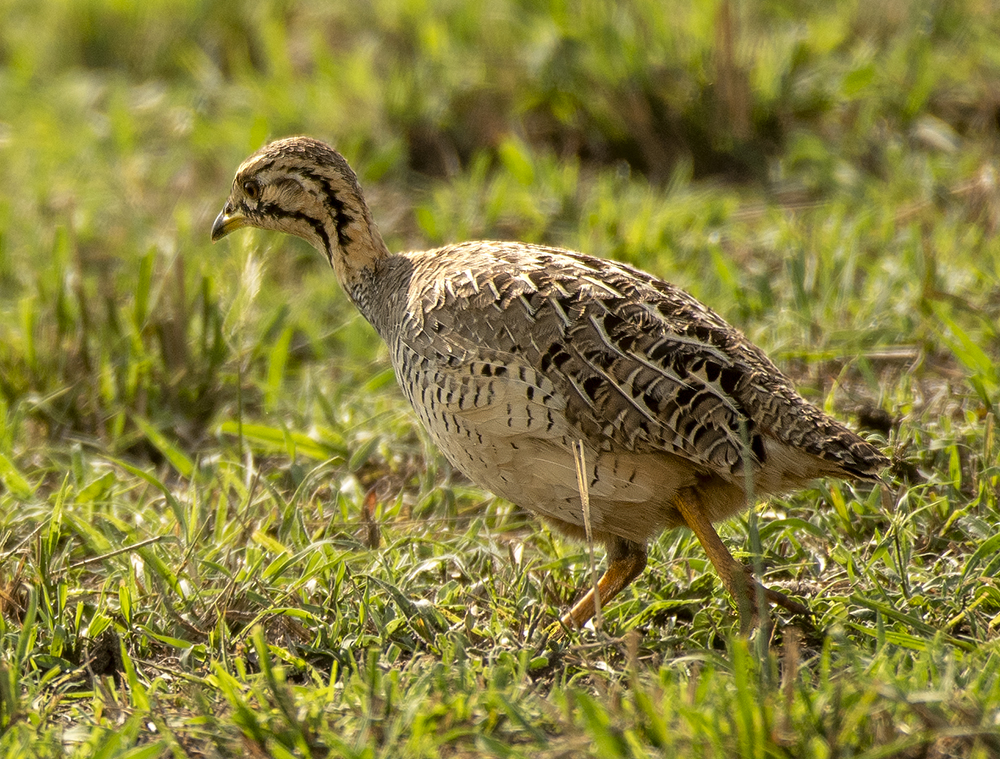
- C. coqui

Scientific classification
- Domain: Eukaryota
- Kingdom: Animalia
- Phylum: Chordata
- Class: Aves
- Order: Galliformes
- Family: Phasianidae
- Tribe: Gallini
- Genus: Campocolinus; Crowe et al, 2020

Type species
- Campocolinus coqui

Species
- Campocolinus coqui; Campocolinus albogularis; Campocolinus schlegelii

= Campocolinus =

Genus of birds

Campocolinus is a genus of birds in the francolin group of the family Phasianidae. They are found in Sub-Saharan Africa.

== Species ==
It contains three species, all of which were formerly classified in Peliperdix. The species are:

Genus Campocolinus – Crowe et al, 2020 – three species
Common name	Scientific name and subspecies	Range	Size and ecology	IUCN status and estimated population
Coqui francolin	Campocolinus coqui (Smith, 1836)	Sahel and Ethiopia.	Size: Habitat: Diet:	LC
White-throated francolin	Campocolinus albogularis (Hartlaub, 1854)	Angola, Benin, Burkina Faso, Cameroon, Democratic Republic of the Congo, Ivory Coast, Gambia, Ghana, Guinea, Mali, Nigeria, Senegal, Togo, and Zambia.	Size: Habitat: Diet:	LC
Schlegel's francolin	Campocolinus schlegelii (Heuglin, 1863)	Cameroon, the Central African Republic, Chad, and South Sudan	Size: Habitat: Diet:	LC
