= Bidher =

- Village and union council
- Country: Pakistan
- Province: Punjab
- District: Talagang
- Time zone: UTC+5 (PST)

Bidher (Urdu: بدھڑ) is a village and union council of Talagang District in the Punjab Province of Pakistan. Bidher is part of Talagang Tehsil.
