= Kot Qazi =

Coordinates: 32°33′N 72°15′E

- Village and union council
- Interactive map of Kot Qazi
- Country: Pakistan
- Province: Punjab
- District: Talagang
- Tehsil: Lawa
- Time zone: UTC+5 (PST)

Kot Qazi is a village and union council of Talagang District in the Punjab Province of Pakistan. It is part of Lawa Tehsil.
