= Chinji =

Town in Punjab, Pakistan

- Town in Talagang
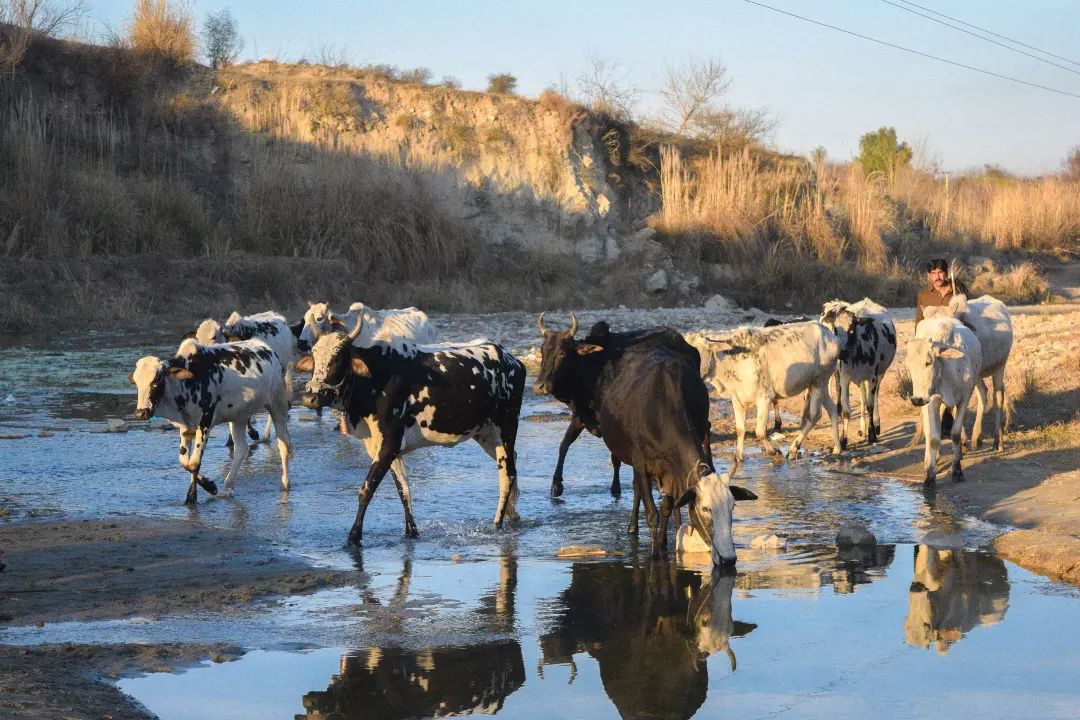
- Interactive map of Chinji
- Coordinates: 33°0′36.87″N 72°29′30.98″E
- Country: Pakistan
- Province: Punjab
- District: Talagang

Chinji is a town in Talagang District of Punjab, Pakistan. One of the town's major attractions is Chinji National Park.
