= Bhilomar =

Village in Punjab, Pakistan

- Union Council
- Bhilomar
- Location in Pakistan
- Coordinates: 32°44′0″N 72°26′0″E
- Country: Pakistan
- Province: Punjab
- District: Talagang
- Time zone: UTC+5 (PST)
  - Summer (DST): +6

Bhilomar (Urdu: بھیلو مار) is a village and union council, of Talagang District in the Punjab Province of Pakistan. It is part of Talagang Tehsil and is located at 32°44'0N 72°26'0E. A majority of the population belongs to the Rajput Bhatti tribe.

There are two high schools each for boys and girls, one Health Center, Two Imam Bargah (Bab-e-Imran and Gharbi Imam Bargah) and one Union Council office.
