= Satyapal Anand =

Indian-American poet and writer (1931–2025)

Satyapal Ananad
- Born: April 24, 1931; Kot Sarang, Talagang District, Punjab Province, British India (now Punjab, Pakistan)
- Died: August 2, 2025 (aged 94); Toronto, Canada
- Occupations: Author and poet

Satyapal Anand (April 24, 1931 – August 2, 2025) was an Indian-American poet, critic and writer. He wrote several fictional and poetry books in four languages: English, Urdu, Hindi and Punjabi. He also received awards for his literary work.

== Early life ==
Anand was born in Kot Sarang, Talagang District, Punjab Province, British India, now in Punjab, Pakistan. He finished his primary education there and attended secondary school in Rawalpindi in 1947. After the partition of India, his family moved to Ludhiana in East Punjab, where he received his college education, earning a Masters in English from the Punjab University in Chandigarh with academic distinction. Later, he earned his first doctoral degree in English Literature with a thesis titled "Changing concept of the nature of reality and literary techniques of expression." He earned his second doctoral degree in Philosophy from the Trinity University, Texas.

== Career ==
=== Academic ===
Anand spent most of his life in teaching graduate and post-graduate students in universities around the globe. Starting with the Punjab University in Chandigarh in 1961, he held teaching positions at other universities, including the University of the District of Columbia (UDC) in Washington, DC. He was also a visiting professor at South Eastern University in Washington, D.C., the University of British Columbia, Vancouver, Canada, and Open University in England. From 1992 to 1995 he was on special assignment as a Professor of Education in the Department of Technical Education, Saudi Arabia. He availed himself of many invitations in his professorial life, having nickname "Air Port Professor" by his pupils and friends. He visited several countries including the UK, Germany, Turkey, Denmark, Norway and North America.

=== Literary ===
Anand's writing career started in the early 50s when in a span of just two years he published a poetry collection, a collection of stories, and novels, all in Urdu. He had his brush with authorities when the Government of Punjab, India banned his Hindi novel "Chowk Ghanta Ghar" in 1957 and ordered his arrest. His first book of short stories was published in 1953, when he was a 22-year young student. He was highly praised by the Urdu writers and poets for his best literary work in Urdu, Punjabi, Hindi and English. He mostly writes poems rather than ghazals. His poems are based on history, mythology or mixed culture of the West and the East.

Anand's English poem "Thus Spake The Fish" has qualified for the award in an international competition by a UN-sponsored committee for "Earth Preservation Day Celebration." The poem,

THUS SPAKE THE FISH

Thus spake the fish to the dwellers of the deep _ Take heed, O brothers _ How this, our ocean was once clean
How dirty has it become _ a muddy pond! _ Wasn't it but a recent event _ That gods of heaven and demons of earth
Joined hands to churn it up _ In an unholy 'manthuna'? _ Used air blowers to awaken the fire demons asleep in the deep

Fired up a hearth of cascading earthquakes! _ Where was the elixir of life _ Indeed where was it?
What they found was poison _ Poison that broke the surface _ And now boils and broils all life forms.
Where are the nymphs – my sisters of yore _ That played with the waves? _ Thus spake the half-dead fish

To the half-dead dwellers of the deep. _ Take heed, my friends _ We're but dead already.

The demons and gods have used a ruse _ To churn up the ocean _ And to turn it into a mud heap.

== Personal life and death ==
Anand married Promila Anand in November 1957 and the couple had two sons (Pramod and Sachin) and a daughter (Daisy).

Anand died in Toronto, Ontario, Canada on August 2, 2025, at the age of 94.

== Awards ==
- Jawaharlal Nehru Fellowship for his book Promises to Keep; Ahmad Adaya
- Urdu Markaz Award, Los Angeles
- Shiromani Sahityakar Award by the Government of Punjab, India

== Bibliography ==
Short stories

- Jeeney Key Liye
- Apney Markaz Ki Taraf
- Dil Ki Basti
- Apni Apni Zanjeer
- Patthar Ki Saleeb

Novels

- Aahat
- Chowk Ghanta Ghar
- Ishq Maut Aur Zindagi
- Shehr Ka Ek Din

Urdu poetry

- Dast e Barg
- Waqt La Waqt
- Aaney Wali Sahar Band Khirki Hai
- Lahu Bolta Hai
- Mustaqbil aa Mujh Se Mil
- Aakhri Chattan Tak
- Mujhay Kar Vida
- Mere Andar Ek Samandar
- Meri Muntakhab Nazmen
- Byaz e Umr

Books in Hindi

- Yug Ki Awaz
- Painter Bawrie
- Azadi Ki Pukar, Bhoori
- Dil Ki Basti
- Chowk Ghanta Ghar
- Geet Aur Ghazles
- Ghazlon Ka Guldasta

In Punjabi

- Saver Dopeher Shaam
- Makhu Mittha
- Ghazal Ghazal Darya
- Ghazal Ghazal Sagar
- Ghazal Ghazal Leher
- Rajneetak Chetana Ate Sutantarta Sangraam

In English

- The Dream Weaver
- A Vagrant Mirror
- One Hundred Buddhas
- If Winter Comes
- Sunset Strands
- Some shallow, some deep
- Life's a tale

== See also ==
- List of Urdu language writers
- List of Urdu language poets
