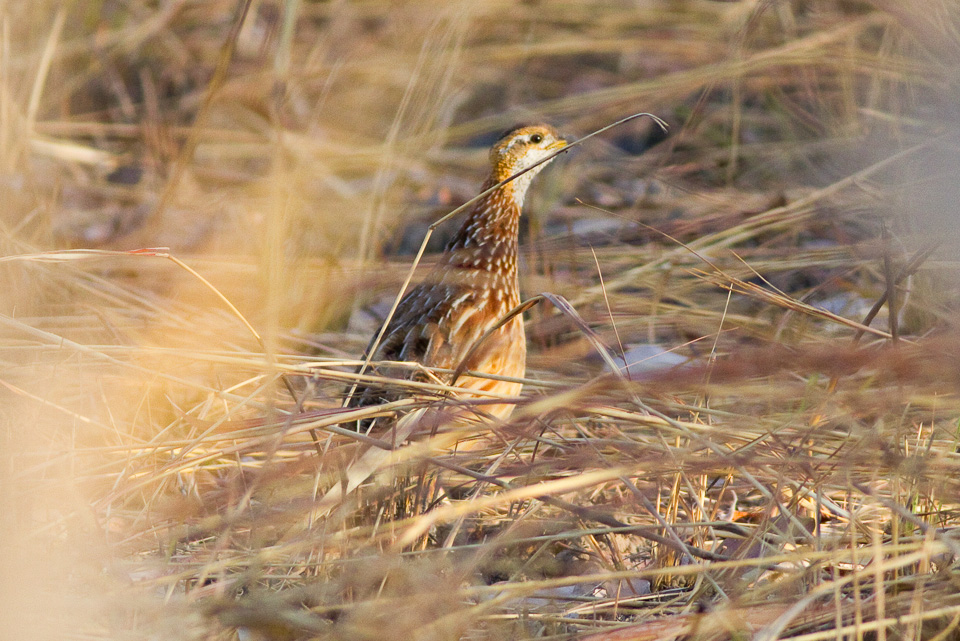

Conservation status
- Least Concern (IUCN 3.1)

Scientific classification
- Kingdom: Animalia
- Phylum: Chordata
- Class: Aves
- Order: Galliformes
- Family: Phasianidae
- Genus: Campocolinus
- Species: C. albogularis

Binomial name
- Campocolinus albogularis (Hartlaub, 1854)

Synonyms
- Francolinus albogularis Peliperdix albogularis

= White-throated francolin =

Species of bird

The white-throated francolin (Campocolinus albogularis) is‌ a species of bird in the family Phasianidae.

It is found in Angola, Benin, Burkina Faso, Cameroon, Democratic Republic of the Congo, Ivory Coast, Gambia, Ghana, Guinea, Mali, Nigeria, Senegal, Togo, and Zambia. These birds are found in tropical and sub-tropical grasslands, savannas, burned lands and shrublands. They feed on seeds and insects.

The white-throated francolin weighs approximately 14–15 g (0.49–0.53 oz) at birth and reaches around 275 g (9.7 oz) as an adult.

Formerly classified in the genus Peliperdix, a 2020 study placed it together with the coqui francolin (C. coqui), and Schlegel's francolin (C. schlegelii) in a new genus Campocolinus. The International Ornithological Congress has accepted these findings.
