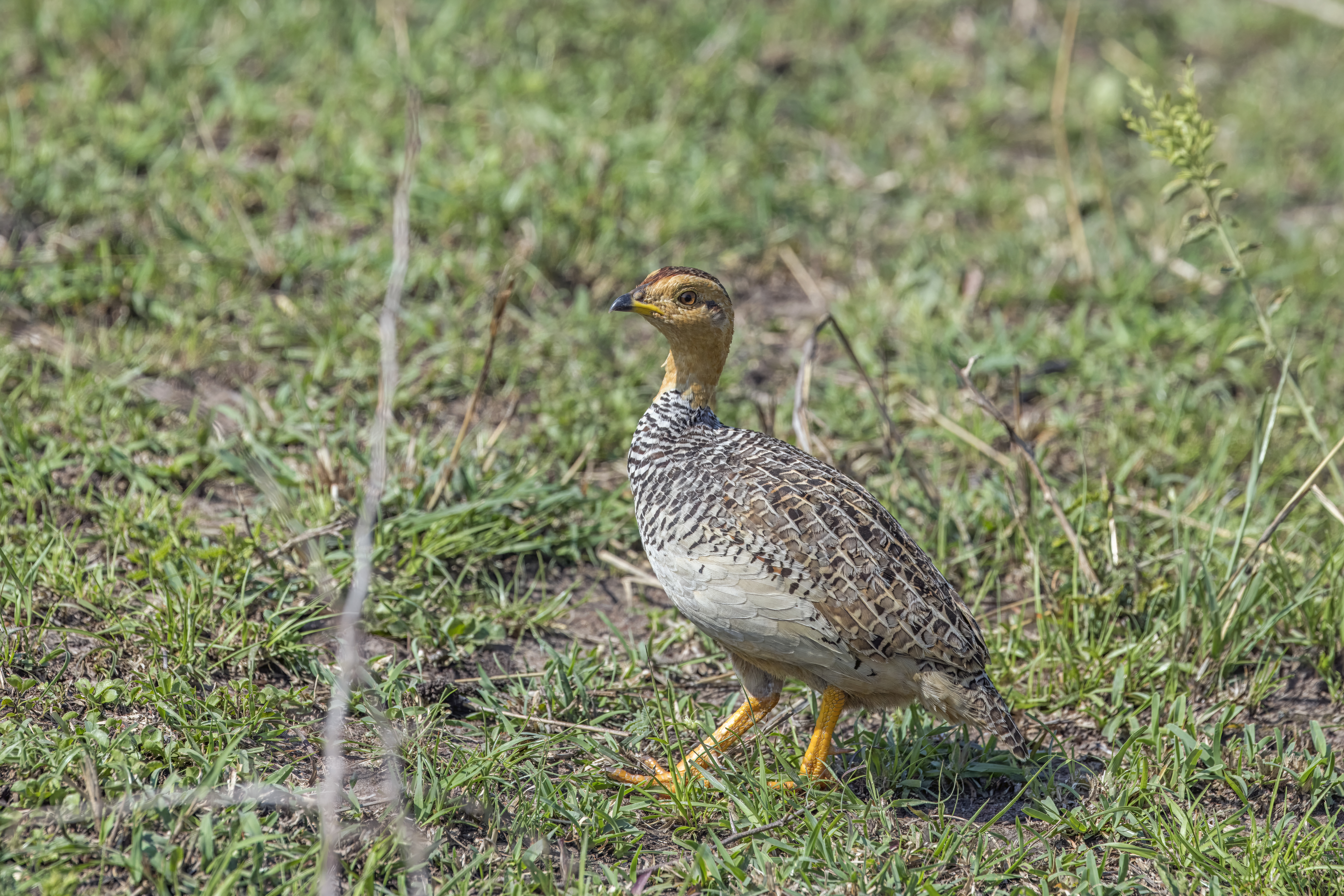
- male P. c. hubbardi Serengeti National Park, Tanzania

Conservation status
- Least Concern (IUCN 3.1)

Scientific classification
- Kingdom: Animalia
- Phylum: Chordata
- Class: Aves
- Order: Galliformes
- Family: Phasianidae
- Genus: Campocolinus
- Species: C. coqui

Binomial name
- Campocolinus coqui (Smith, 1836)

Synonyms
- Francolinus coqui Peliperdix coqui

= Coqui francolin =

Species of bird

The Coqui francolin (Campocolinus coqui) is a species of bird in the family Phasianidae.

== Taxonomy ==
Formerly classified in the genus Peliperdix, a 2020 study found it, the white-throated francolin (C. albogularis), and Schlegel's francolin (C. schlegelii) together comprise a new genus Campocolinus. The International Ornithological Congress has accepted these findings.

== Range ==
It is mainly found in Africa's southern half but is also sparsely present in the western Sahel and Ethiopia. It is believed to be the most widespread francolin in Africa.

== Habitat ==
It mainly inhabits grasslands, steppes, savannas and dry scrubland, but also bright forest and grain fields. On high plateaus it lives up to 2,000 meters high. It is mostly resident throughout its range.

== Gallery ==
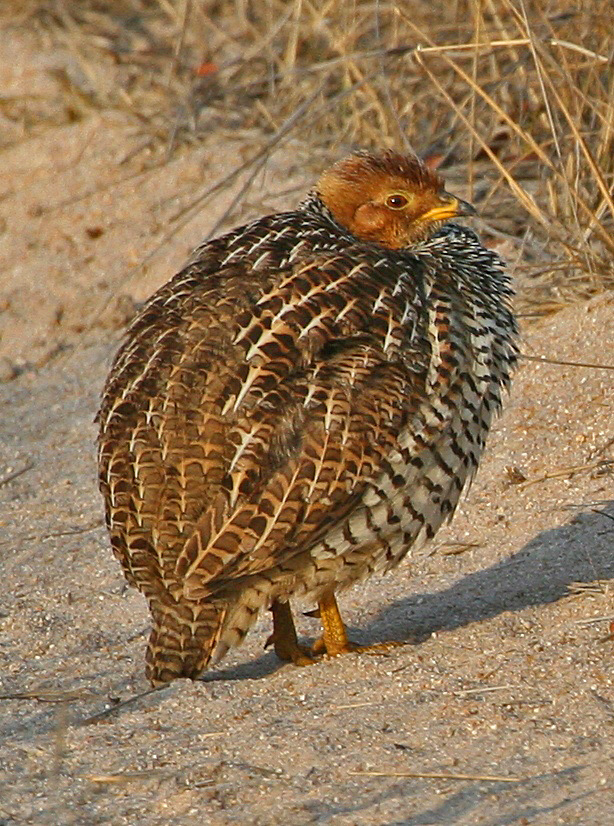
Male of nominate race, eastern Botswana

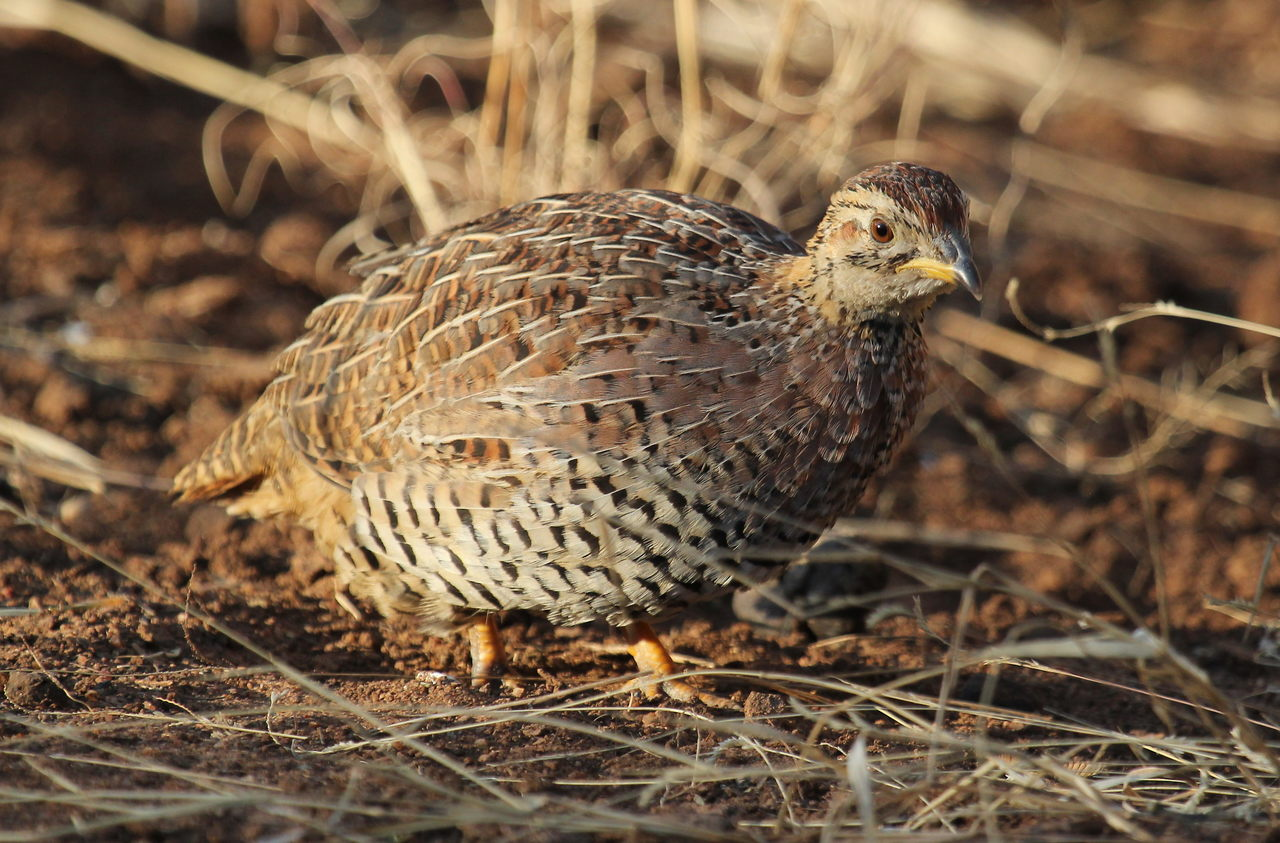
Female of nominate race, Limpopo

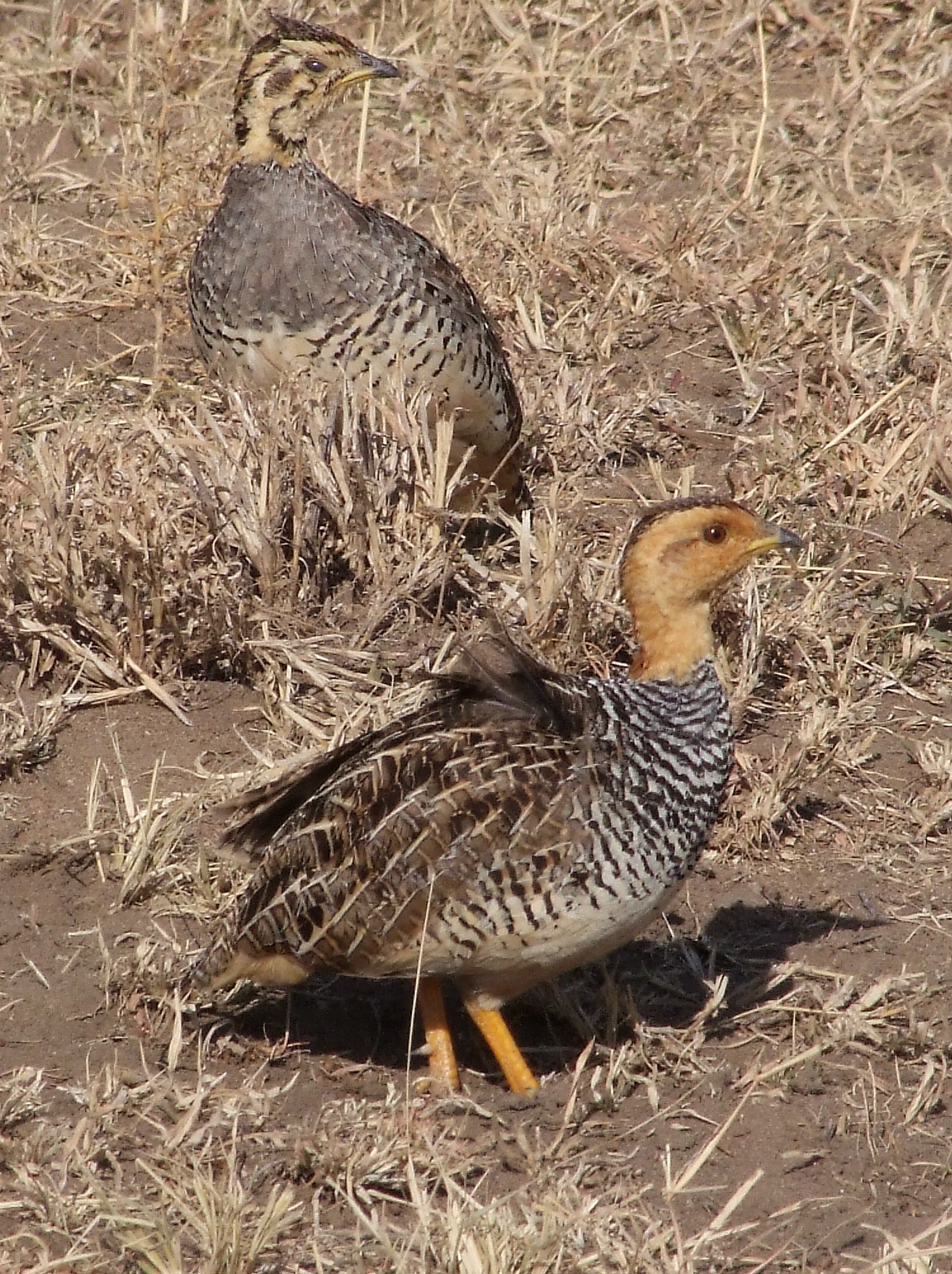
P. c. hubbardi pair in the Serengeti, Tanzania
