= Kot Sarang =

- Village and Union council
- Location in Pakistan
- Coordinates: 32°2′14″N 72°23′11″E
- Country: Pakistan
- Province: Punjab
- District: Talagang
- Time zone: UTC+5 (PST)

Kot Sarang is a village and union council of Talagang District in the Punjab province of Pakistan. It is part of Talagang Tehsil.

The village is named after Sarang Khan Gakhar.

Dr. Satyapal Anand, a poet and writer, was born in Kot Sarang in 1931. His house still stands in village, showing the old culture.
