= Kahut =

Kahut often spelled as Kahout or Kahoot, are an agricultural Jutt tribe found in Chakwal, Shahpur, Gujrat, Rawalpindi and Jhelum districts of Punjab and Hazara region of Pakistan.

They gave their name to the Kahuta hills of Rawalpindi district and to the town of Kahuta.

== History ==
=== Origin ===
Their head-quarters were found in Salt Range and give its name to the Kahutani ilaqa of Chakwal tehsil. They were originally located in Arabia and belong from Quraish Tribe within the Quraish tribe they descend from Khalid bin Walid the companion of the Islamic Prophet, the present tribal name being merely that of their common ancestor: 24 generations ago. about the year A. D. 1359 their ancestor Said Nawab Ali migrated to Delhi, in the reign of Firuz Shah Tughlaq: (Firoz Tughlaq, son of Muhammad Tughlaq, is no doubt meant: he reigned from 1351 to 1388 A. D.):

The Kahut Quraish tribe can also be linked directly back to Arabian Quraish tribe of Muhammad and his family.

=== Journey through India, settlement ===
On the way to Delhi they fought and conquered a pagan king of Sialkot, named Sain Pal, who was, they say, probably a Dogra prince. On reaching Delhi they paid their respects to the king who ordered them to hold the Dhanni and the Salt Range on his behalf: under the leadership of Muhammad Ali Kahut, the son of Said Nawab Ali, they accordingly retraced their steps to this district, and settled first at Gagnelpur, of which the ruined site is shown in Mauza Wariamal near the foot of the Salt Range : here they remained for some time, realising the revenue from the Janjuas of the hills and the Gujar graziers of the Dhanni, and remitting it to Delhi. The Mairs and Kassars had not then arrived in these parts, but came six or seven generations afterwards. The eastern Dhanni was then a lake, which on the coming of Babar was drained at his command, the Kahuts taking part in the work and colonising the land reclaimed. Chaudhri Sahnsar, 8th in descent from Kahut (the son of Nawab Ali), was their ancestor in the time of Babar. During the Mughal period (around 15th Century), the Kahut rose to prominence until their power was destroyed by the Sikhs in 19th Century. The southern part of Chakwal tehsil where Kahuts predominate is still known as the Kahutani, a reflexion of their past dominance. Sometime during the Sikh period, groups of Kahut immigrated to Sargodha and Mandi Bahauddin.

=== Extant settlements ===
The most important Kahut families are located in the village of Kariala, bhalla and mohra Qazi in Chakwal. Other Kahut villages include Bhalla, Bhawan, Bhuchal Kalan, Chakora, Dhok Tallian, Dullah, Hasola, Langah, Domali, Musa Kahoot, Kahut, Kassowal, Nikka Kahut, Tatral, Thirpal, Thoha Bahader, Janga, Sadwal, Waryamal and Warwal, Kotha Abdal, Mohara kor chisham. In Mandi Bahauddin District, they are found in villages in Union Council Ahla Haryah, and Bhikhi. While in Sargodha, their villages include Pindi Kootan near Bhera, and Kahut in the Sahiwal Tehsil.

=== Modern migration ===
Many Kahut Quraish families have now emigrated around the world such as Denmark, United Kingdom, Canada and United States.
