= Talagang Tehsil =

Tehsil in the Talagang District in the Punjab province of Pakistan.

Talagang تلہ گنگ
- District
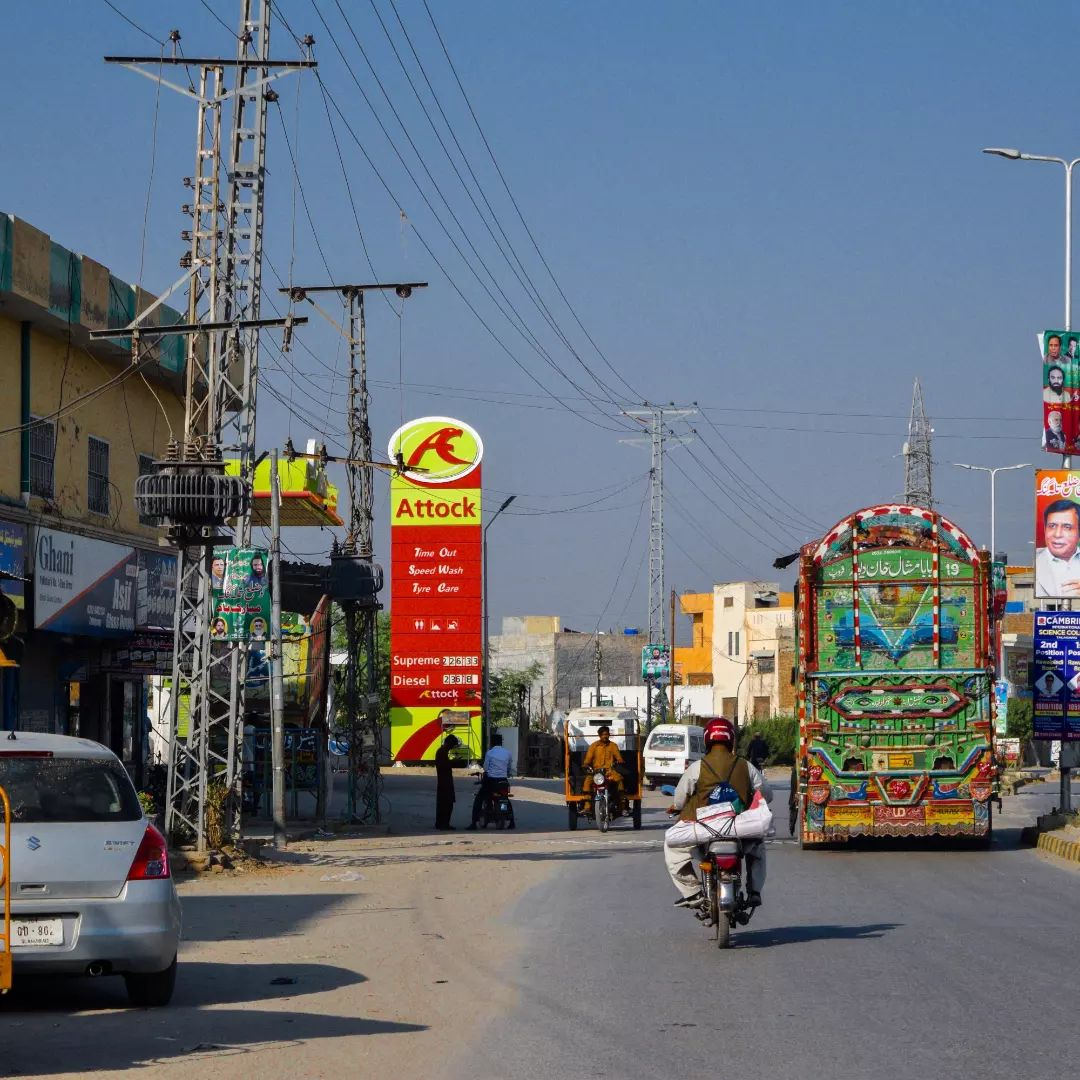

- Location in Pakistan
- Coordinates: 32°55′40″N 72°24′40″E
- Country: Pakistan
- Province: Punjab
- Division: Rawalpindi
- Headquarters: Talagang District
- Subdivisions: List: 1 Town; 19 Union councils

Government
  - Type: Council Government
  - Assistant Commissioner: Vacant

Area
  - District: 2,022 km^{2} (781 sq mi)

Population (2023)
  - District: 457,635
  - Density: 226.3/km^{2} (586.2/sq mi)
  - Urban: 79,431 (17.36%)
  - Rural: 378,204 (82.64%)
- Time zone: UTC+5 (PST)
- Area code: 0543
- Website: www.talagangonline.com

Talagang (تلہ گنگ) is a tehsil in the Talagang District in the Punjab province of Pakistan. Talagang city serves as its administrative center, and the district is part of the Rawalpindi Division.

== Administrative divisions ==
Under the Punjab Local Government Act 2019, the tehsil is subdivided into 19 union councils and 1 Municipal Committee.

== Union Councils ==
- Bhilomar
- Bidher
- Budhial
- Dhermund
- Dhoular
- Jabbi Shah Dilawar
- Jassial
- Jhatla
- Kot Sarang
- Malakwal
- Multan Khurd
- Lawa
- Naka Kahoot
- Nirghee
- Piera Fatehial
- Saghar
- Tamman
- Tehi
- Thoa Mehram Khan

== Demography ==
=== Population ===
Historical population
Year	Pop.	±% p.a.
1951	...	—
1961	...	—
1972	...	—
1981	...	—
1998	...	—
2017	401,607	—
2023	457,635	+2.20%

As of the 2023 census, Talagang tehsil has a population of 457,635.

== See also ==
- Tehsils of Pakistan
  - Tehsils of Punjab, Pakistan
  - Tehsils of Balochistan
  - Tehsils of Khyber Pakhtunkhwa
  - Tehsils of Sindh
  - Tehsils of Azad Kashmir
  - Tehsils of Gilgit-Baltistan
