= Jhatla =

- Village and union council
- Interactive map of Jhatla
- Country: Pakistan
- Region: Punjab Province
- District: Talagang
- Time zone: UTC+5 (PST)

Jhatla is a village and union council of Talagang District in the Punjab Province of Pakistan. Located at 32°48'50N 72°58'31E, it is part of Talagang Tehsil.
