= Lawa, Pakistan =

City in Punjab, Pakistan

Lawa لاوا
- City
- Location in Pakistan Lawa (Pakistan)
- Coordinates: 32°41′48″N 71°55′52″E
- Country: Pakistan
- Province: Punjab
- District: Talagang
- Tehsil: Lawa
- Elevation: 416 m (1,365 ft)

Population (2023)
  - Total: 20,619
- Time zone: UTC+5 (PST)

Lawa (Urdu, Punjabi: لاوا) is a city and the headquarters of Lawa Tehsil of Talagang District in the Punjab province of Pakistan.

Some of the notable neighboring villages include Danda Shah Bilawal, Chaki Sheikh and Changa.

== Demographics ==
=== Population ===
Historical population
Year	Pop.	±% p.a.
1951	...	—
1961	...	—
1972	...	—
1981	...	—
1998	...	—
2017	15,595	—
2023	20,619	+4.76%

As of the 2023 census, Lawa had a population of 20,619.

== Geography ==
Lawa is situated on the northern bank of the seasonal Tarappi stream, about 51 kilometres southwest of the district seat Talagang. It has an average elevation of 416 metres above the sea level.

== Climate ==
Lawa has a Humid Subtropical Climate (Cwa). The wettest month is July, with an average rainfall of 193 mm, and the driest is November, with an average rainfall of 19 mm.

Climate data for Lawa
Month	Jan	Feb	Mar	Apr	May	Jun	Jul	Aug	Sep	Oct	Nov	Dec	Year
Mean daily maximum °C (°F)	16.7 (62.1)	18.9 (66.0)	24.3 (75.7)	30.6 (87.1)	36.5 (97.7)	37.9 (100.2)	34.5 (94.1)	32.9 (91.2)	32.0 (89.6)	29.4 (84.9)	23.5 (74.3)	18.9 (66.0)	28.0 (82.4)
Daily mean °C (°F)	11.4 (52.5)	13.6 (56.5)	18.5 (65.3)	24.1 (75.4)	29.7 (85.5)	32.2 (90.0)	30.4 (86.7)	29.0 (84.2)	27.5 (81.5)	23.8 (74.8)	18.0 (64.4)	13.3 (55.9)	22.6 (72.7)
Mean daily minimum °C (°F)	6.3 (43.3)	8.0 (46.4)	12.3 (54.1)	17.0 (62.6)	22.0 (71.6)	25.6 (78.1)	25.9 (78.6)	25.0 (77.0)	22.8 (73.0)	18.1 (64.6)	12.7 (54.9)	8.0 (46.4)	17.0 (62.6)
Average rainfall mm (inches)	29 (1.1)	61 (2.4)	81 (3.2)	69 (2.7)	35 (1.4)	67 (2.6)	193 (7.6)	190 (7.5)	87 (3.4)	37 (1.5)	19 (0.7)	19 (0.7)	887 (34.8)
Source: Climate-Data.org
