= Saghar, Chakwal =

Pakistani village

Saghar Saghar
- Village and union council
- Interactive map of Saghar
- Country: Pakistan
- Province: Punjab
- District: Talagang

Population
  - Total: 50,000
- Time zone: UTC+5 (PST)
- Postal code: 48150
- Area code: 0543

Saghar is a village and union council of Talagang District in the Punjab Province of Pakistan. It is part of Talagang District.
