= Lawa Tehsil =

Tehsil of District Talagang in Punjab, Pakistan

Lawa Tehsil تحصیل لاوا
- Tehsil
- Location within Punjab, Pakistan Location within Pakistan
- Coordinates: 32.696409°N 71.93228°E
- Country: Pakistan
- Province: (Punjab, Pakistan) Punjab
- District: Talagang
- Union Council: 6
- Headquarters: Lawa

Area
  - Tehsil: 977.7 km^{2} (377.5 sq mi)
- Elevation: 427 m (1,401 ft)

Population (2023)
  - Tehsil: 144,611
  - Density: 147.9/km^{2} (383.1/sq mi)
  - Urban: 20,619 (14.26%)
  - Rural: 123,992 (85.74%)

Literacy (2023)
  - Literacy rate: Total: (71.37%); Male: (85.90%); Female: (56.75%)
- Time zone: UTC+5 (PST)
- Postcode: 48250
- Area code: 0543
- Languages: Urdu, Punjabi

Lawa Tehsil (تحصیل لاوا) is one of the three tehsils of Talagang District in the Punjab province of Pakistan. It is located at an altitude of 508 metres (1669 feet) and lies adjacent to Mianwali District. Lawa is predominantly inhabited by the Awan tribe. It has boundaries with Mardwal via Goohal on one side while through Darbata is linked with Kalabagh. Neighbour is Danda Shah Bilawal & Wadi Soon Sakesar.

== Education ==
Lawa has notable Islamic & conventional educational institutions.

Government Institutes

- Government Higher Secondary School for Boys No 1 & 2
- Government Higher Secondary School for Girls No 1 & 2
- Government Degree College for Women

Private Schools

- Zaib Public School Lawa (Boys & Girls)
- Zest Public School
- Masabeeh Public School
- Mumadan Public School
- Holy Public School
- THE Educator System Lawa
- Al-Rasheed Islamic Education System, Lawa
- Sirat International School System for Boys & Girls

Islamic seminaries

- Jamaya Shaeed Masjid
- Jamaya Khatme Nabuwat
- Jamaya Anwar ul Quran

== Demographics ==
=== Population ===
Historical population
Year	Pop.	±% p.a.
1951	...	—
1961	...	—
1972	...	—
1981	...	—
1998	...	—
2017	117,929	—
2023	144,611	+3.46%

As of the 2023 census, Lawa tehsil has population of 144,611. Out of which, Urban population is 20,619 which is nearly 14.26% and rural population is 123,992.

As of the 2023 census, Lawa Tehsil has a total literacy rate of 71.37%, with male literacy at 85.90% and female literacy at 56.75%.

== Climate ==
Lawa is 417m above sea level. In Lāwa, the climate is warm and temperate. In winter, there is much less rainfall in Lāwa than in summer. According humid subtropical climate (Köppen Cwa).The average temperature in Lāwa is 22.6 °C | 72.7 °F. The rainfall here is around 887 mm | 34.9 inch per year. The driest month is November. There is 19 mm | 0.7 inch of precipitation in November. With an average of 193 mm | 7.6 inch, the most precipitation falls in July.

With an average of 32.2 °C | 90.0 °F, June is the warmest month. January has the lowest average temperature of the year. It is 11.4 °C | 52.5 °F

== See also ==
- Divisions of Pakistan
  - Divisions of Punjab, Pakistan
- Districts of Pakistan
  - Districts of Punjab, Pakistan
- Tehsils of Pakistan
  - Tehsils of Punjab, Pakistan
  - Tehsils of Balochistan
  - Tehsils of Khyber Pakhtunkhwa
  - Tehsils of Sindh
  - Tehsils of Azad Kashmir
  - Tehsils of Gilgit-Baltistan
