= Dhrabi =

Dhari Punjab, Pakistan

Dharabi
- Location within Pakistan
- Coordinates: 32.57°N 72.32°E
- Country: Pakistan
- Province: Punjab
- District: Chakwal

Area
  - Total: 1.6 km^{2} (0.62 sq mi)
- Elevation: 408 m (1,339 ft)
- Time zone: UTC+5 (PST)

Dharabi & Dhari Anwal is a village in Chakwal District, Punjab province of Pakistan. The village gets its name from the Dharab River that flows nearby. The river is a tributary of Soan River out fall in Indus River at a distance of about 15 kilometres (9.3 mi) from village Balkasar Motorway interchange. The Islamabad-Lahore M2 motorway passes over this river.

A water reservoir was constructed on this river. Dharabi Dam which is supposed to be the largest water reservoir in the district has the capacity of storing 37,000 acre feet of water but it may not serve the purpose as lands it was supposed to irrigate lie at a higher altitude. The technical issues was raised in the nascence of the project but it was not attended to and the project was completed in 2009. The project once fully operational will bring about 6400 Acres of land water under irrigation out of which 6000 Acres through gravity flow and 400 Acres through lift (Small Dam Organization, 2007).

== Introduction ==
Dharabi is a village located in the midst of cities of Chakwal and Talagang, in Punjab, Pakistan. The village Dharabi is named after the river Dharab passing through this village, which stretches to Kallar Kahar. Its total area is 1.6 km2 (0.6 sq mi) and it is elevated at 408 m (1,339 ft).

=== Etymology ===
Dharabi(‘Dhar’-‘aabi’) is an amalgam of two words ‘Dhar’ and ‘Aab’ which means ‘located in the middle of water. Dharabi literally means a place located in the middle of water.

=== Historical background ===
As told by the natives of Dharabi, this village was first inhabited by Raja Hakim Khan Janjua Rajput. Hindus and Sikhs also lived here before partition. The schools where the Hindu and Sikh teachers taught are still exist in Dharabi.The competitor of Hakim Khan was from the Dranga whose name was Allah Dita. Dharabi came into being after a war between them that was held in area known as purani dharab.

=== Neighboring areas ===
The adjoining areas include Dhari Anwal, Naka Kahoot, Bikhari Kalan, Balkasar, Bharpur, Thoa Bahadar, Mengen, Bhoun, Jhamrah, Dharokna, Kadhar, Kalar Kahar, pindi Gheb, Dudhial, Lilla, Bhera, Alipur Syedan, Karsal, Tuti bann, Nakka kahoot and Bhagwal.

=== Language ===
The inhabitants of Dharabi primarily speak Punjab.

=== Sources of earning ===
About 70 per cent of the population of Dharabi relies on agriculture, natural resources and livestock as their major sources of earning livelihood.

=== Residence of the inhabitants ===
Primitively the people of Dharabi used to live in cob houses but recently the trend has shifted. People now make well insulated-cemented houses. Other sources of income include selling firewood, grass and fodder, medicinal plants, fruits and vegetables grown by the people themselves.

=== Domestic Farming ===
This domestic farming in the village of Dharabi includes the breeding, raising, gathering, and caring for poultry, domestic animals and domesticated wild animals, such as cattle, sheep, dogs, buffalo, and collecting their products, such as milk, wool, and eggs. People either sell these products or the off-springs produced by them.

=== Migration to other countries ===
Many from Dharabi have shifted to Dubai and Saudi Arab in order to get jobs in Security Companies, Hotel Services, Hospitals, personal business and in the Restaurants.
