= Tehi =

- Village and union council
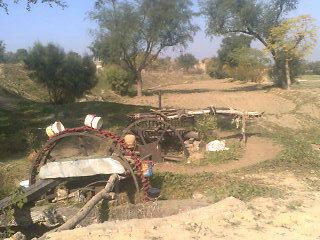
- Interactive map of Tehi
- Coordinates: 32°58′0″N 72°24′0″E
- Country: Pakistan
- Province: Punjab
- District: Talagang
- Time zone: UTC+5 (PST)
- Area code: 0543

Tehi is a village and one of the 23 union councils of Talagang District, in Punjab Province, Pakistan. Over 150 families in Tehi rely on pottery as their primary source of income, continuing the centuries-old tradition of creating clay wares.
