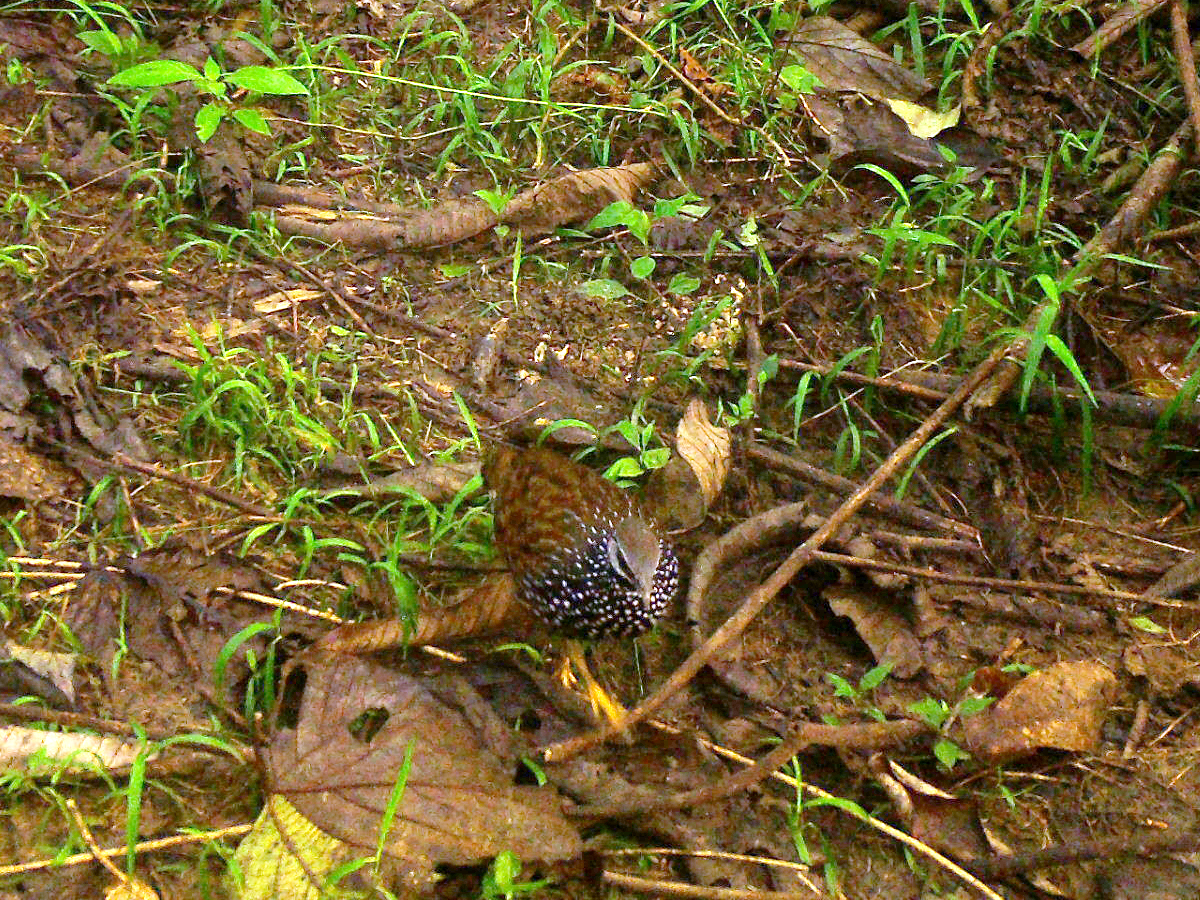
- in Odigbo, Nigeria

Conservation status
- Least Concern (IUCN 3.1)

Scientific classification
- Kingdom: Animalia
- Phylum: Chordata
- Class: Aves
- Order: Galliformes
- Family: Phasianidae
- Tribe: Gallini
- Genus: Peliperdix; Bonaparte, 1856
- Species: P. lathami

Binomial name
- Peliperdix lathami (Hartlaub, 1854)

Synonyms
- Francolinus lathami

= Latham's francolin =

Species of bird

Latham's francolin (Peliperdix lathami) or the forest francolin, is a species of bird in the francolin group of the family Phasianidae. It is the only member of the monotypic genus Peliperdix. It is widespread across the African tropical rainforest.

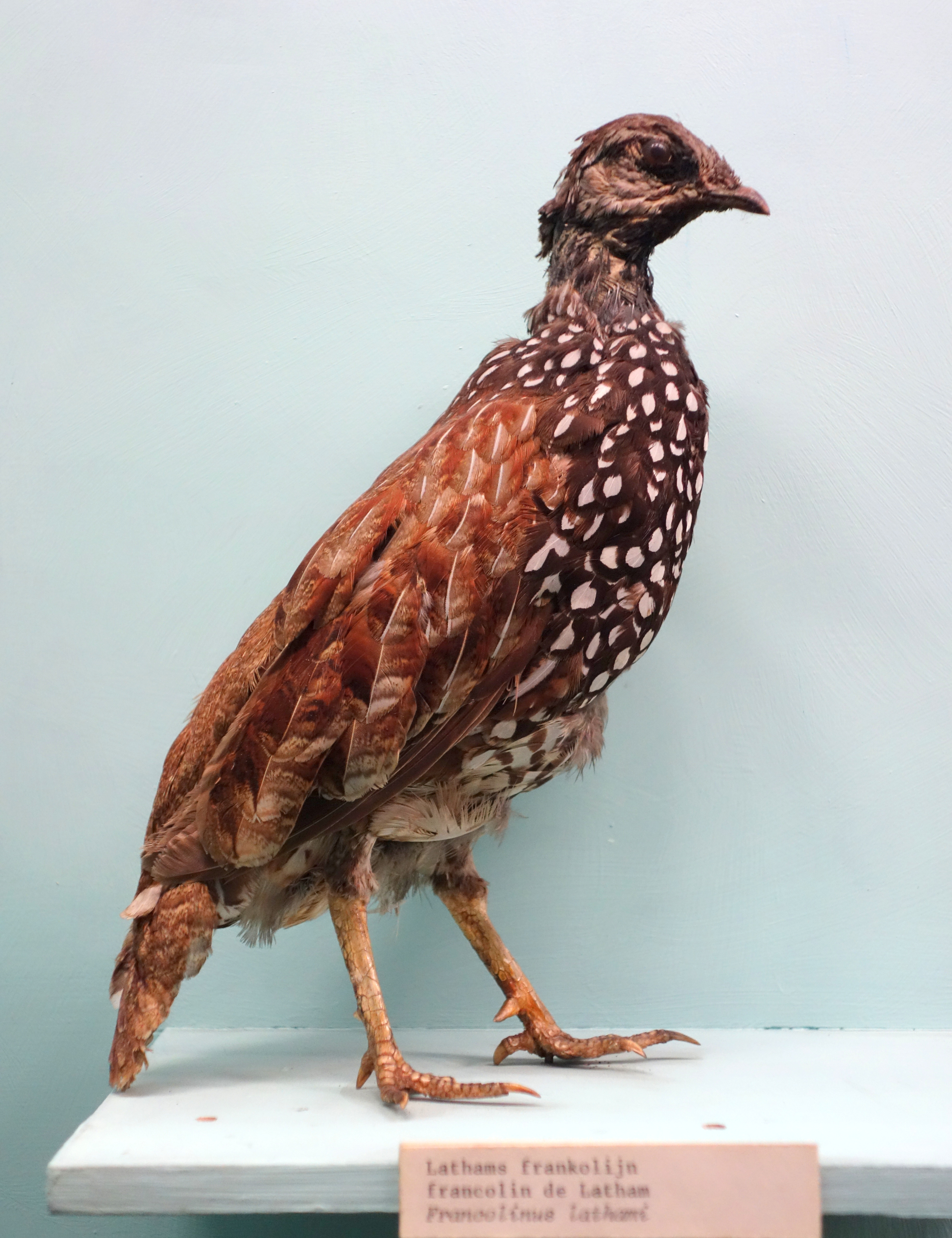
An exhibit at the Royal Museum for Central Africa.
