= Talagang =

City in Punjab, Pakistan

Talagang تلہ گنگ
- City
- Talagang
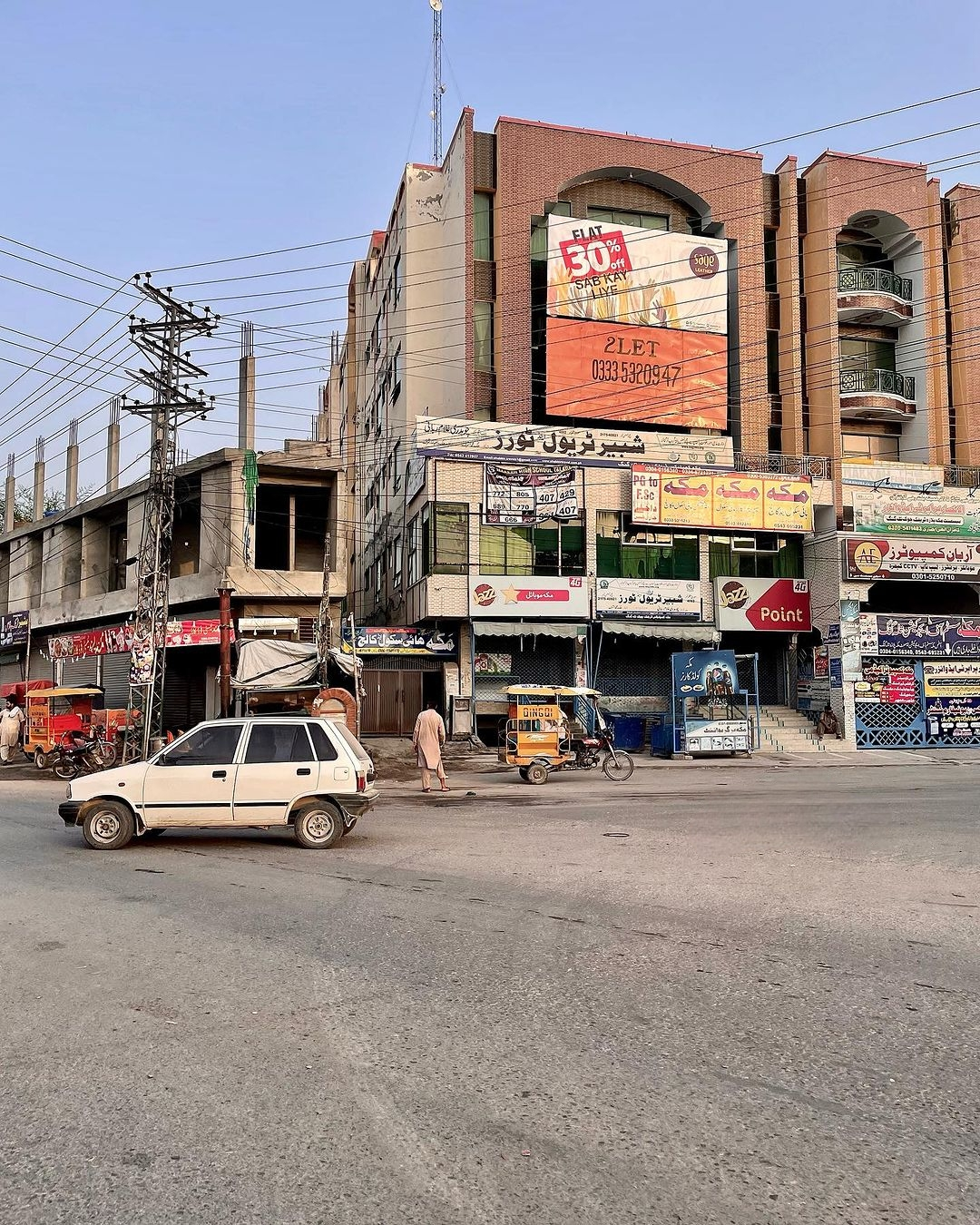
- Traffic Chowk, Talagang

- Location within Punjab, Pakistan Location within Pakistan
- Coordinates: 32°55′40″N 72°24′40″E
- Country: Pakistan
- Province: Punjab
- District: Talagang District
- Division: Rawalpindi Division

Government
  - Type: Municipal Committee
  - Chairman: Vacant
  - Vice-Chairman: Vacant

Population (2023)
  - City: 79,431
  - Rank: 161st in Pakistan
- Time zone: UTC+5 (PST)
- Postal code: 48100
- Calling code: 0543

Talagang (Punjabi / Urdu: تلہ گنگ) is a city and the administrative headquarters of Talagang District located in Punjab, Pakistan.

The city is located on the Potohar Plateau, north of the Salt Range and east of the Kala Chitta Range.

Talagang is known for its literary tradition and has produced notable writers and poets including Satyapal Anand. The local economy is largely based on arid agriculture. The region is especially known for peanut production, which is among the highest in the Potohar region.

Talagang is the largest peanut-producing region in the Rawalpindi Division It produces 70% of the district’s peanut output. The crop is grown on 42,000 acres in the tehsil.

The area is also known for hunting grounds and wildlife including black francolin, white-throated francolin, quail, and hare.

== Etymology ==
The historical name of Talagang was Awan Mahal, associated with the Awan tribe. Many Awans trace their lineage to Ali ibn Abi Talib, the cousin and son-in-law of the Islamic prophet Muhammad.

== Location ==
Talagang is located approximately:

- 45 km from Chakwal
- 112 km from Islamabad
- 237 km from Lahore

It lies near the M-2 Motorway and historically functioned as a transport hub along the Islamabad–Karachi route. The development of the Rawalpindi–Mianwali CPEC route has changed traffic patterns in the region.

== History ==
Historically, Talagang served as a regional administrative and agricultural centre. During the British Raj, the area contributed significantly to military recruitment.

Military figures from the region include Subedar Major Mauladad Khan of the Punjab Regiment, who was known for his long service and influence in military traditions.

== Economy ==
The economy is mainly based on:

- Agriculture
- Livestock
- Trade
- Small businesses
- Government employment

Peanut farming is a major economic activity, alongside wheat and other dryland crops.

== Demography ==
=== Population ===
Historical population
| Year | Pop. | ±% p.a. |
|---|---|---|
| 1951 | 8,755 | — |
| 1961 | 10,818 | +2.14% |
| 1972 | 17,395 | +4.41% |
| 1981 | 20,885 | +2.05% |
| 1998 | 37,766 | +3.55% |
| 2017 | 64,083 | +2.82% |
| 2023 | 79,431 | +3.64% |

As of the 2023 Pakistani census, Talagang had a population of 79,431.

== Notable people ==
- Satyapal Anand – Writer and poet
- Nur Khan – Former Chief of Air Staff, Pakistan Air Force

Lieutenant Malik Mohammed Khan was a notable local welfare figure who promoted education, including girls’ education, in Talagang during the mid-20th century.

== Wildlife ==
Wildlife found in the surrounding rural areas includes:

- Black francolin
- White-throated francolin
- Quail
- Hare

== Transport ==
Talagang is connected by road networks to:

- Islamabad
- Rawalpindi
- Chakwal
- Mianwali

== See also ==
- Talagang District
- Pothohar Plateau
- Punjab, Pakistan
- Economy of Punjab, Pakistan
