= Talagang District =

District in Punjab, Pakistan

Talagang District ضلع تلہ گنگ
- District of Punjab
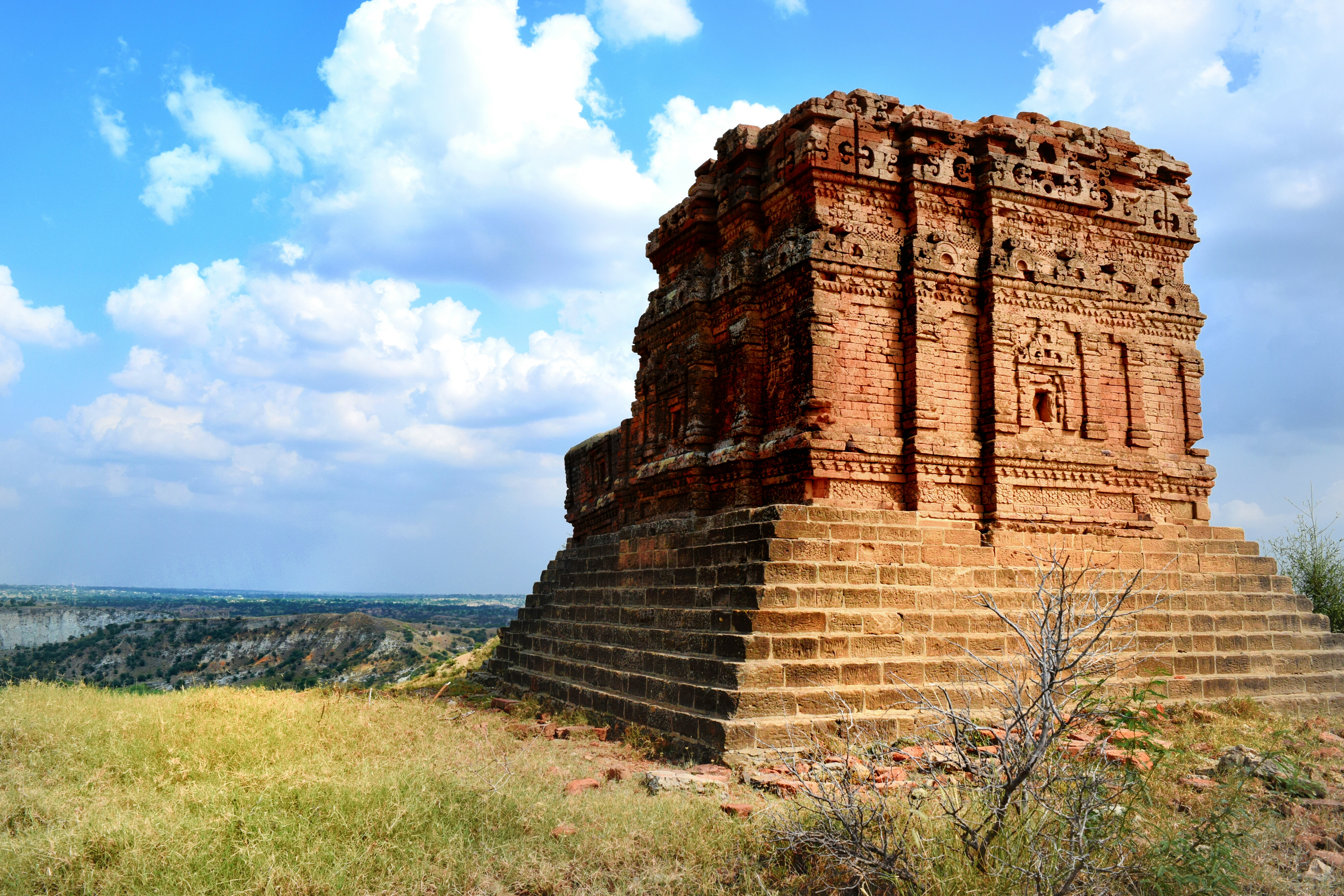
- Sassi da Kallar, ruined Hindu temple

- Coordinates: 32°55′40″N 72°24′40″E
- Country: Pakistan
- Province: Punjab
- Division: Rawalpindi
- Established: 14 October 2022
- Headquarters: Talagang

Government
  - Type: District Administration
  - Deputy Commissioner: Mohammad Shahid Iqbal
  - District Police Officer: Ayyan Shahid
  - District Health Officer: N/A

Area
  - District of Punjab: 2,932 km^{2} (1,132 sq mi)

Population (2023 Census of Pakistan)
  - District of Punjab: 602,246
  - Density: 205.4/km^{2} (532.0/sq mi)
  - Urban: 100,050 (16.61%)
  - Rural: 502,196 (83.39%)
- (old Talagang Tehsil & Lawa Tehsil was made Talagang District in October 2022)
- Time zone: UTC+5 (PST)
  - Summer (DST): UTC+6 (PDT)
- Number of Tehsils: 2

Talagang District (Punjabi and Urdu: ضلع تلہ گنگ, romanized: Zilā' Talā-gang) is a district within the Rawalpindi Division of Punjab, Pakistan. Located on the Pothohar Plateau in northwestern Punjab, it was formerly a tehsil (sub-district) within the Chakwal District; being raised to the status of district in October 2022 by the government of Punjab.

It is part of the Potohar plateau and lies on the north of Salt Range and east of the Kala Chitta range. Talagang is 45 km from Chakwal. The motorway M2 is located 30 km from Talagang. It is bordered by Khushab to its South, Attock to its North, Chakwal to its East, and Mianwali to its West.

== History and culture ==
It was declared a district on 14 October 2022 by Chief Minister Punjab Chaudhary Pervaiz Elahi on the request of former Provincial Minister and MPA Hafiz Ammar Yasir. Former Talagang Tehsil was part of District Campbellpur (now Attock District) until 1985, when District Chakwal was created. Tehsil Talagang was merged with Chakwal. There are two Municipal Committees (Lawa, Talagang) in District Talagang . District Council Talagang has also been notified in the official Gazette of the Punjab. In the over 150 families of Talagang pottery manufacturing is the primary source of income, continuing the centuries-old tradition of creating handmade clay wares.

The culture of Talagang is a mix largely rural lifestyle with a blend of suburban lifestyle in the city. Since the region was classified as a martial area by the colonial governments, its inhabitants are largely in service of military alongside agriculture sector is dominant business in Talagang. People have simple and pure lifestyles which was twice exhibited in an art exhibition at Somerset House in an international photography contest by World Photography Organisation by a Talagang based young photographer Zohaib Tariq

== Demographics ==
=== Population ===
Historical population
Year	Pop.	±% p.a.
1951	...	—
1961	...	—
1972	...	—
1981	...	—
1998	401,607	—
2017	527,756	+1.45%
2023	602,246	+2.22%

As of the 2023 census, Talagang district has 101,362 households and a population of 602,246. The district has a sex ratio of 100.53 males to 100 females and a literacy rate of 74.63%: 86.34% for males and 63.02% for females. 131,597 (21.85% of the surveyed population) are under 10 years of age. 100,050 (16.61%) live in urban areas.

=== Religion ===
Religion in contemporary Talagang District
Religious group	1941		2017		2023	
Religious group	Pop.	%	Pop.	%	Pop.	%
Islam	125,512	91.94%	526,926	99.84%	599,865	99.60%
Hinduism (Note: 1931-1941: Including Ad-Dharmis)	7,616	5.58%	55	0.01%	25	~0%
Sikhism	3,380	2.48%	—N/a	—N/a	2	~0%
Christianity	4	~0%	690	0.13%	2,266	0.38%
Others	4	~0%	85	0.02%	88	0.02%
Total Population	136,516	100%	527,756	100%	602,246	100%
Note: 1941 census data is for Talagang tehsil of Attock district, which roughly corresponds to contemporary Talagang district. District and tehsil borders have changed since 1941.

=== Language ===
Languages of Talagang district (2023)
1. Punjabi (96.0%)
2. Pashto (2.58%)
3. Others (1.43%)

At the time of the 2023 census, 95.99% of the population spoke Punjabi and 2.58% Pashto as their first language.

== Administration ==
Tehsil	Area (km²)	Pop. (2023)	Density (ppl/km²) (2023)	Literacy rate (2023)	Union Councils	No. of villages	No. of public schools	No. of police stations	No. of post offices
Talagang	2,022	457,635	226.33	75.63%	19	75	300	1	12
Lawa	910	144,611	158.91	71.37%	5	5	116	1	3

== Gallery ==
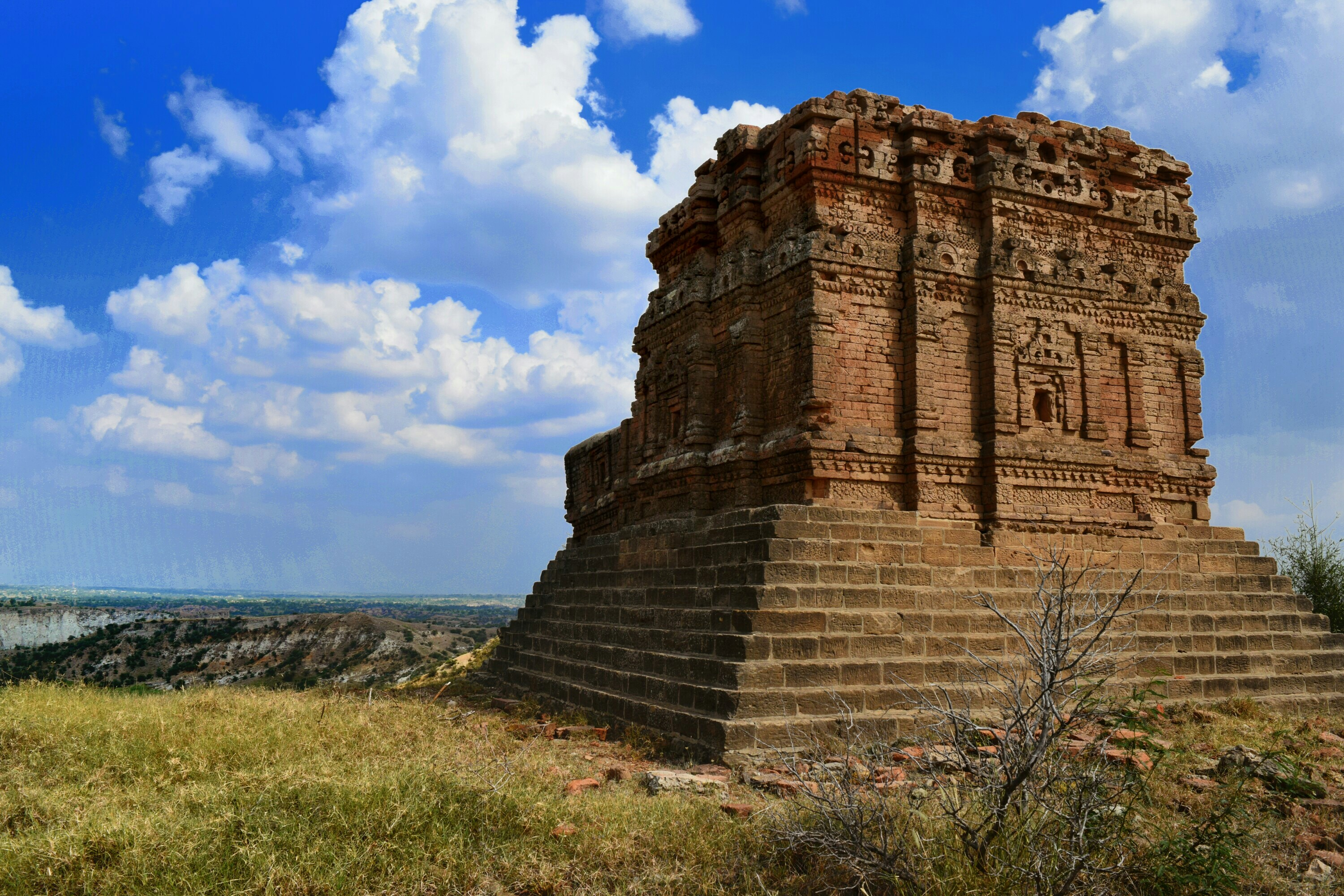
Hindu temple in Talagang District

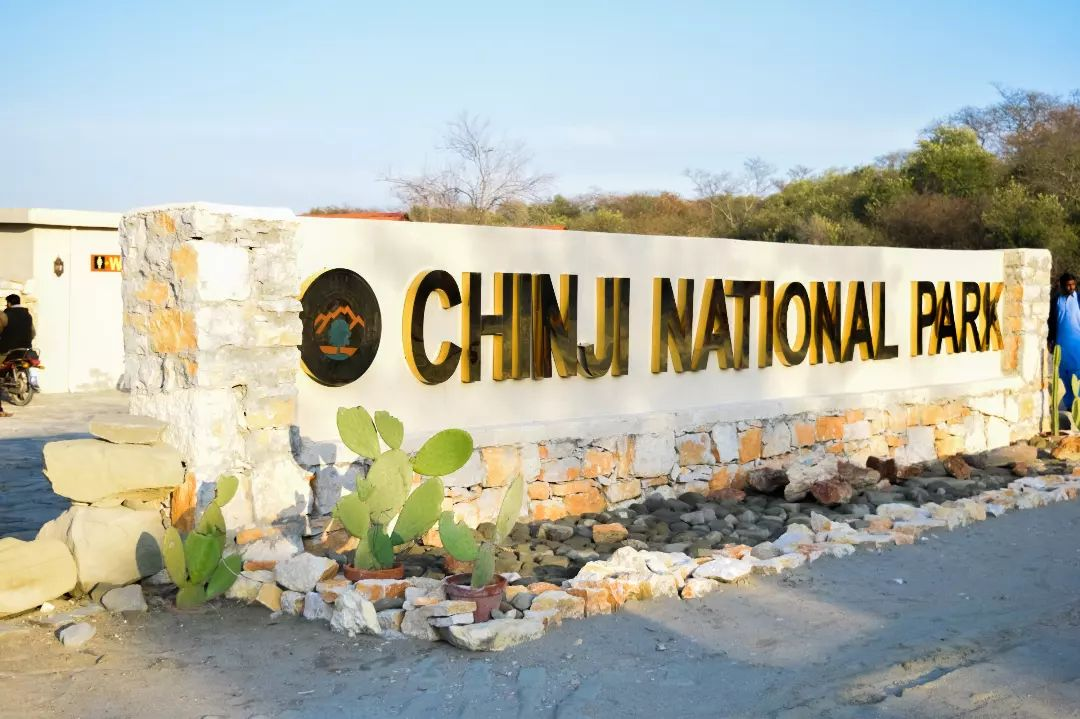
Chinji National Park in Talagang District

I love Talagang board in Kalma Chowk in Talagang City.

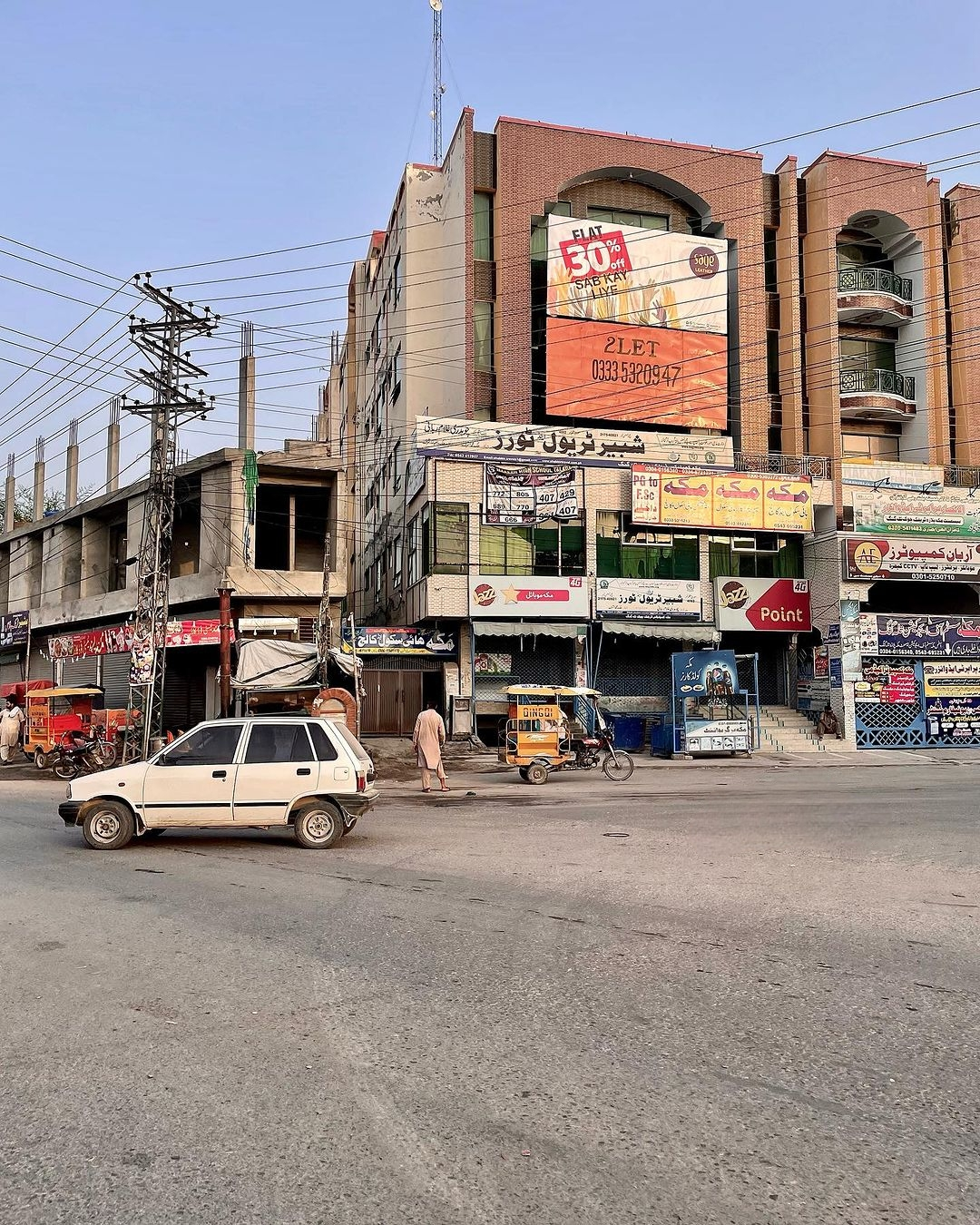
Traffic Chowk

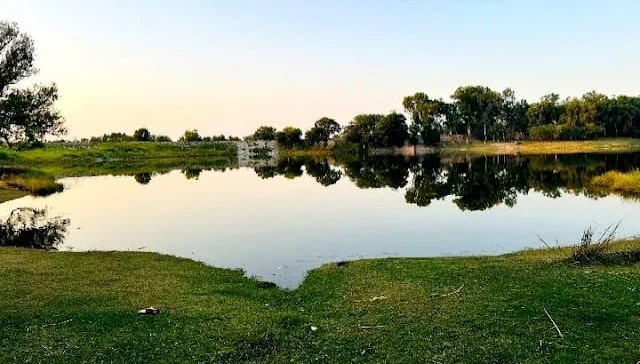
Ghabir dam

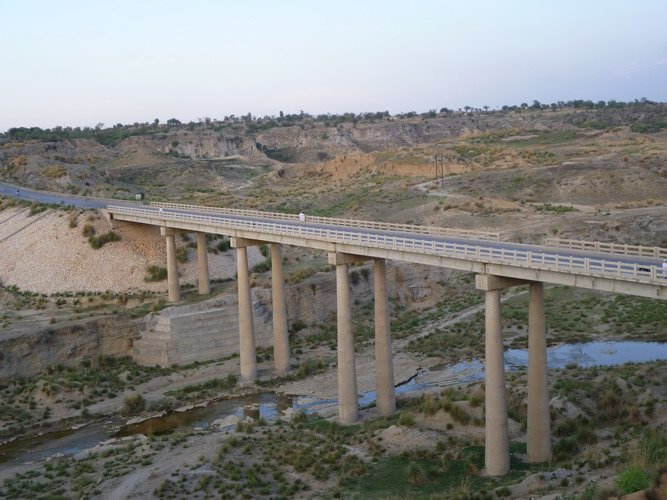
Nala Ankar Bridge
