= Pahari-Pothwari =

Lahnda dialect group spoken in Pakistan

- پہاڑی ،پوٹھواری; Poṭhohārī, Pahāṛī
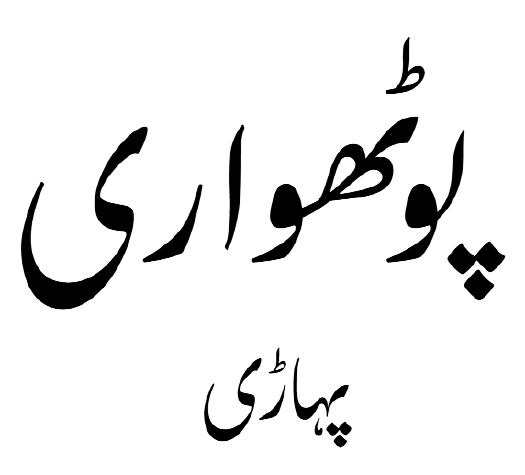
- Native to: Pakistan
- Region: Northern half of Pothohar region in Punjab, Azad Kashmir and western parts of Jammu and Kashmir
- Native speakers: several million (Note: Baart (2003, p. 10) provides an estimate of 3.8 million, presumably for the population in Pakistan alone. Lothers & Lothers (2010, p. 9) estimate the Pakistani population at well over 2.5 million and the UK diaspora at over 0.5 million. The population in India is reported in Ethnologue (2017) to be about 1 million as of 2000.)
- Language family: Indo-European: Indo-Iranian; Indo-Aryan; Northwestern; Punjabi; Lahnda; Pahari-Pothwari
- Writing system: Shahmukhi

Language codes
- ISO 639-3: phr
- Glottolog: paha1251 Pahari Potwari

Pahari-Pothwari (Note: Pahari: پَہاڑِی, romanized: pahāṛī, pronounced [pɐ̯ˈäː˥˩.ɽi(ː)]) (Note: Pothohari: پوٹھوہارِی, romanized: poṭhohārī, pronounced [poˑʈ̆.ʈʰo̯ˈä˥˩.ɾi(ː)]) is a Western dialect continuum of the greater macrolanguage group of Punjabi within the Indo-Aryan language family, (Note: There is no consensus among linguists or Pahari-Pothwari speakers in terms of its status as a dialect of Punjabi or a separate language entirely. For the difficulties in assigning the labels "language" and "dialect", see Shackle (1979) for Punjabi and Masica (1991, pp. 23–27) for Indo-Aryan generally.) spoken in the northern half of Pothohar Plateau in Punjab, Pakistan, as well as in most of the Pakistan-administered Azad Kashmir and in the western areas of Indian-administered Jammu and Kashmir. It is known by a variety of names, the most common of which are Pahari (English: /pəˈhɑːri/; an ambiguous name also applied to other unrelated languages of India), and Pothwari (or Pothohari).

The group is transitional between Hindko and Majhi and is mutually intelligible with both. There have been efforts at cultivation as a literary language, although a local standard has not been established yet. The Shahmukhi script is used to write the language, such as in the works of Punjabi poet Mian Muhammad Bakhsh.

Grierson in his early 20th-century Linguistic Survey of India assigned it to a so-called "northern cluster" of Lahnda (Western Punjabi), but this classification, as well as the validity of the Lahnda grouping in this case, have been called into question. In a sense all Lahnda and Charhda varieties, and Majhi are dialects of a greater Punjabi macrolanguage group.

== Geographic distribution and dialects ==
Azad Kashmir and surrounding areas with some of the locations mentioned in this section. Places where Pahari–Pothwari is spoken are in dark red.

There are at least three major dialects: Pothwari, Mirpuri and Pahari. (Note: According to Lothers & Lothers (2010, p. 2). Abbasi (2010, p. 104) adds as a fourth dialect the Poonchi spoken from Poonch to the Neelam Valley. Yet another classification is reportedly presented in Karnai (2007).)

The dialects are mutually intelligible, but the difference between the northernmost and the southernmost dialects (from Muzaffarabad and Mirpur respectively) is enough to cause difficulties in understanding.

=== Pothohar Plateau ===
Pothwari (پوٹھوہاری), also spelt Potwari, Potohari and Pothohari, is spoken in the northern half of Pothohar Plateau of northwestern Punjab, an area administratively within Rawalpindi Division. Pothwari is its most common name, and some call it Pindiwal Punjabi to differentiate it from the dialects spoken elsewhere in Punjab.

Pothwari extends southwards up to the Salt Range, with the city of Jhelum marking the border with Majhi dialect. To the north, Pothwari transitions into the Pahari-speaking area, with Bharakao, near Islamabad, generally regarded as the point where Pothwari ends and Pahari begins. In Attock and Talagang districts of Pothohar, it comes in contact with other Lahnda varieties, namely Chacchi, Awankari and Ghebi. In Chakwal, yet another dialect is spoken, Dhani.

Pothwari is generally viewed as a dialect of Punjabi, and in census reports the speakers in Punjab return their language as Punjabi. (Note: For example, according to the 1981 census report for Rawalpindi District, 85.1% of households had Punjabi as the mother tongue. In any census, only a small number of major languages have been counted separately; there has not been a separate option available for either Pahari or Pothwari, however an "Other" option has been available.)

=== Mirpur ===
East of the Pothwari areas, across the Jhelum River into Mirpur District in Azad Kashmir, the language is mostly indistinguishable from the Pothwari spoken in the neighbouring Pothohar Plateau rather than the Pahari which is spoken in the rest of Azad Kashmir. Locally it is known by a variety of names: (Note: One language activist from the diaspora in Britain "[has] said that he does not give the language a single name because those who speak the language call it many different things." (Lothers & Lothers 2012, p. 3).) Pothohari, Mirpur Pothwari, Mirpuri, (Note: Some, at least in the British diaspora, consider this term to be a misnomer if applied to the language. (Lothers & Lothers 2012, p. 3).) and Pothwari, while some of its speakers call it Punjabi. Mirpuris possess a strong sense of Kashmiri identity that overrides linguistic identification with closely related groups outside Azad Kashmir, such as the Pothwari Punjabis. The Mirpur region has been the source of the greater part of Pakistani immigration to the UK, a process that started when thousands were displaced by the construction of the Mangla Dam in the 1960s and emigrated to fill labour shortages in England. The British Mirpuri diaspora now numbers several hundred thousand, and Pothwari has been claimed to be the second most common mother tongue in the UK till replaced by Polish, yet the language is little known in the wider society there and its status has remained surrounded by confusion.

=== Kashmir, Murree and the Galyat ===
Pahari (پہاڑی) is spoken to the north of Pothwari. The central cluster of Pahari dialects is found around Murree. This area is in the Galyat: the hill country of Murree Tehsil in the northeast of Rawalpindi District (just north of the capital Islamabad) and the adjoining areas in southeastern Abbottabad District. One name occasionally found in the literature for this language is Dhundi-Kairali (Ḍhūṇḍī-Kaiṛālī), a term first used by Grierson who based it on the names of the two major tribes of the area – the Kairal and the Dhund. Its speakers call it Pahari in Murree Tehsil, while in Abbottabad District it is known as either Hindko or Ḍhūṇḍī. Nevertheless, Hindko – properly the language of the rest of Abbottabad District and the neighbouring areas of Khyber Pakhtunkhwa – is generally regarded as a different language. It forms a dialect continuum with Pahari, and the transition between the two is in northern Azad Kashmir and in the Galyat region. For example, on the road from Murree northwest towards the city of Abbottabad, Pahari gradually changes into Hindko between Ayubia and Nathiagali.

A closely related dialect is spoken across the Jhelum River in Azad Kashmir, north of the Mirpuri areas. Names associated in the literature with this dialect are Pahari (itself the term most commonly used by the speakers themselves), Chibhālī, named after the Chibhal region or the Chibh ethnic group, and Pahari (Poonchi) (پونچھی, also spelt Punchhi). The latter name has been variously applied to either the Chibhali variety specific to the district of Poonch, or to the dialect of the whole northern half of Azad Kashmir. This dialect (or dialects) has been seen either as a separate dialect from the one in Murree, or as belonging to the same central group of Pahari dialects. The dialect of the district of Bagh, for example, has more shared vocabulary with the core dialects from Murree (86–88%) than with the varieties of either Muzaffarabad (84%) or Mirpur (78%).

In Muzaffarabad the dialect shows lexical similarity (Note: The similarity between wordlists containing 217 items of basic vocabulary from each location. (Lothers & Lothers 2010, pp. 15–16)) of 83–88% with the central group of Pahari dialects, which is high enough for the authors of the sociolinguistic survey to classify it is a central dialect itself, but low enough to warrant noting its borderline status. The speakers however tend to call their language Hindko and to identify more with the Hindko spoken to the west, despite the lower lexical similarity (73–79%) with the core Hindko dialects of Abbottabad and Mansehra. Further north into the Neelam Valley the dialect, now known locally as Parmi, becomes closer to Hindko.

Pahari is also spoken further east across the Line of Control into the Pir Panjal mountains in Indian-administered Jammu and Kashmir. The population, estimated at 1 million, is found in the region between the Jhelum and Chenab rivers: most significantly in the districts of Poonch and Rajouri, to a lesser extent in neighbouring Baramulla and Kupwara, and also – as a result of the influx of refugees during the Partition of 1947 – scattered throughout the rest of Jammu and Kashmir. Pahari is among the regional languages listed in the sixth schedule of the Constitution of Jammu and Kashmir. This Pahari is sometimes conflated with the Western Pahari languages spoken in the mountainous region in the south-east of Indian Jammu and Kashmir. These languages, which include Bhadarwahi and its neighbours, are often called "Pahari", although not same they are closely related to Pahari–Pothwari.

=== Diaspora ===
Pahari Pothwari is also very widely spoken in the United Kingdom. Labour shortages after World War II, and the displacement of peoples caused by the construction of the Mangla Dam, facilitated extensive migration of Pahari-Pothwari speakers to the UK during the 1950s and 1960s, especially from the Mirpur District. Academics estimate that between two thirds and 80% of people officially classified as British Pakistanis originate as part of this diaspora, with some suggesting that it is the second most spoken language of the United Kingdom, ahead of even Welsh, with hundreds of thousands of speakers. However, since there is little awareness of the identity of the language among speakers, census results do not reflect this. The highest proportions of Pahari-Pothwari speakers are found in urban centres, especially the West Midlands conurbation and the West Yorkshire Built-up Area.

== Phonology ==
=== Vowels ===
Vowels of Pahari
	Front		Central		Back	
	oral	nasal	oral	nasal	oral	nasal
Close	iː	ĩː			uː	ũː
Near-close	ɪ				ʊ	
Mid	e eː	ẽː	ə		o oː	
Open	æ æː		aː	ãː		

Vowels of Pothwari
	Front		Central		Back	
	oral	nasal	oral	nasal	oral	nasal
Close	i iː	ĩ ĩː			u uː	ũ ũː
Mid	e	ẽ	ɐ	ɐ̃	o	õ
Open					ɑ	ɑ̃

A long diphthong /ɑi/ can be realized as [äː].

=== Consonants ===
Consonants of Pahari
		Labial	Dental	Alveolar	Post-alv./ Palatal	Velar	Glottal
Stop/ Affricate	voiceless	p	t̪	t	t͡ʃ	k	
Stop/ Affricate	aspirated	pʰ	t̪ʰ	tʰ	t͡ʃʰ	kʰ	
Stop/ Affricate	voiced	b	d̪	d	d͡ʒ	ɡ	
Fricative	voiceless	f		s	ʃ	x	
Fricative	voiced	v		z		ɣ	ɦ
Nasal		m		n		ŋ	
Approximant				l	j		
Tap/Trill				r	ɽ		

Consonants of Pothwari
		Labial	Alveolar	Retroflex	Post-alv./ Palatal	Velar/ Uvular	Glottal
Stop	voiceless	p	t	ʈ		k	
Stop	aspirated	pʰ	tʰ	ʈʰ		kʰ	
Stop	voiced	b	d	ɖ		ɡ	
Stop	breathy	bʱ	dʱ	ɖʱ		ɡʱ	
Affricate	voiceless		t͡s				
Affricate	aspirated		t͡sʰ				
Affricate	voiced		d͡z				
Fricative	voiceless	(f)	s		ʃ	(χ)	h
Fricative	voiced	v	z		(ʒ)	(ʁ)	h
Nasal		m	n	ɳ			
Approximant			l	ɭ	j		
Tap/Trill			r	ɽ			

- Sounds [f, ʒ, χ, ʁ, q] are heard from Persian and Arabic loanwords.
- /h/ is realized as voiced [ɦ] in word-initial position.
- /n/ before a velar consonant can be heard as [ŋ].

== Morphology ==
=== Nouns ===
==== Case table ====
Extended masculine forms can be realised as being added the oblique forms ending in -e, which is shortened to -i- (phonetically [e̯]) before back vowels and is lost before front vowels.

Pahari-Pothwari case endings table
class	gender	number	direct	oblique	vocative	ablative	locative	instrumental
extended form	masculine	singular	kuttā	kutte	kuttiā	kuttiū̃	kutte	
extended form	masculine	plural	kutte	kuttiā̃	kuttio			
extended form	feminine	singular	kuttī		kuttīe			
extended form	feminine	plural	kuttīā̃		kuttīo			
unextended forms	masculine	singular	ghar	ghare	gharā	gharū̃	ghare	
unextended forms	masculine	plural	ghar	gharā̃	gharo		gharī̃	
unextended forms	feminine	singular	gall	galle	galle	gallū̃	galle	
unextended forms	feminine	plural	gallā̃		gallo		gallī̃	

Notes:

- Extended nouns generally end in -ā for masculine and -ī for feminine in the direct singular form

==== Oblique form ====
The numbers in their oblique form function the same throughout Punjabi dialects.

English	Pothohari	Jhangochi	Majhi
I got it for forty-four	میں ایہہ چُرتالیاں نا آندا آ	میں ایہہ چُرتالیاں دا آندا اے	میں ایہہ چوتالیاں دا آندا آ
above twenty-five or thirty	پنجِیاں ترِیہاں توں اپّر	پنجِیاں ترِیہاں توں اُتّے	پنجِیاں ترِیہاں توں اُتّے
after two or four days	دوَنہہ چَونہہ دیہاڑیاں بعد	دَونہہ چَونہہ دیہاڑیاں پِچھّوں	دَونہہ چَونہہ دیہاڑیاں پِچھّوں
at 8:46	اٹھّ چھتالیاں اپّر	اٹھّ چھتالیاں تے	اٹھّ چھتالیاں تے
for almost five lakh	پنجاں اِک لکھّاں نا	پنجاں اِک لکھّاں دا	پنجاں اِک لکھّاں دا
nearing twenty	وِیہاں نے نیڑے	وِیہاں دے نیڑے	وِیہاں دے نیڑے

==== Oblique case of nouns ====
Pahari-Pothwari has unique forms for nouns in oblique cases. This is not observed in Standard Punjabi, but is seen in Hindko.

English	Pahari-Pothwari	Standard Punjabi
English	Shahmukhi	Shahmukhi
housework	گھرے نا کمّ	گھر دا کمّ
dinner	راتی نی روٹی	رات دی روٹی
in a young age	نِکّی عُمرے وِچ	نِکّی عُمر وِچّ
on my heart	مھاڑے دِلّے اپّر	میرے دِل تے
with care	دھیاݨے نال	دھیان نال
patiently	ارامے نال	ارام نال
to my sister	بھیݨُوں کی	بھین نُوں
for my brother	بھراُو واسطے	بھرا واسطے
important detail	کمّے نی گلّ	کمّ دی گلّ
there's no accounting for taste	شَونقے نا کوئی مُل نہیں ہوݨا	شَونق دا کوئی مُل نہیں ہوندا
understand the point	گلّے کی سمجھ	گلّ نُوں سمجھ

==== Vocative case ====
These cases remain the same between Pothohari and other dialects.

As example of the vocative case:

English	Pothohari	Majhi
oh my son!	او مھاڑیا پُتّرا	او میریا پُتّرا
born to a blind a woman! (derogatory)	اَنّھی نیا	اَنّھی دیا
oh you people of God!	او ﷲ نیو بندیو	او ﷲ دیو بندیو
listen to me, girl	کُڑِیے گلّ سُݨ	کُڑِی گلّ سُݨ
brother!	بھراوا	بھراوا
oh elderly! (can be singular)	بُزرگو	بزرگو

Pronominal suffixes

Pothohari makes use of the general Punjabi suffixes.

	romanisation	
	singular	plural
2nd person	-ī	-ne
3rd person	-s	-ne

Examples:

English	Pothohari	Jhangochi / Shahpuri	Majhi
alright, what did he say next? (3.p.s.)	ہالا فیر کے آخیا ہیس/ہس؟	ہالا مُڑکی آکھیُس؟ ہالا مُڑ کی آکھیا سُو؟	اچھا فیر کی اکھیا سُو؟
are your hands and feet broken? (2.p.p.)	ہتھّ پَیر بھجّے / ترُٹّے نی؟	ہتھّ پَیر بھجّے نی؟	ہتھّ پَیر بھجّے نی؟ (یا ٹُٹّے)
I'm bringing it for you (2.p.s.)	ایہہ میں تہاڑے واسطے آݨنا ای	ایہہ میں تیرے واسطے لیاندا ای	ایہہ میں تیرے واسطے آݨدا ای
did you eat? (2.p. respectful)	روٹی کھادی نے؟	روٹی کھادی ہِنے؟	روٹی کھادی جے؟
he didn't even bother this much (3.p.s.)	اتنا وی نہیں٘س آخیا	ایتݨاں وی نِسُو آکھیا	اِنّا وی نہیں آکھیا سُو

=== Pronouns ===
==== Full pronoun tables ====
Pahari-Pothwari personal pronouns
person		number	direct	oblique	dative	genitive
1st person		singular	mẽ		mikī	mhārā
1st person		plural	as	asā̃	asā̃-kī	sāhṛā
2nd person		singular	tū̃		tukī	tahrā/tuhāṛā
2nd person		plural	tus	tusā̃	tusā̃-kī	tusā̃-nā
3rd person	near	singular	é	is	is-kī	is-nā
3rd person	near	plural	é	ehnā̃	ehnā̃-kī	ehnā̃-nā
3rd person	remote	singular	ó	us	us-kī	us-nā
3rd person	remote	plural	ó	ohnā̃	ohnā̃-kī	ohnā̃-nā

=== Verbs ===
==== Adding "i" to root form of verb ====
A peculiar feature of Pahari-Pothwari is to end the basic root form of verbs with an "i" sound.

English	Pahari-Pothwari	Standard Punjabi
English	Shahmukhi	Shahmukhi
it happened	ہوئی گیا	ہو گیا
it may be possible	ہوئی سکنا اے	ہو سکدا اے
together	رلی مِلی تے	رل مِل کے
finish it	مُکائی چھوڑ	مُکا چھڈّ/چھوڑ
look	تکّی گھِنو	ویکھ لو
come back after having lunch	روٹی کھائی تے مُڑی اچھِیں	روٹی کھا کے مُڑ آوِیں
eat it	کھائی گھِن	کھا لَے
sit quietly for once	کدے ٹِکی تے بہی وی جُلیا کر	کدے ٹِک کے بہہ وی جایا کر

==== Future tense ====
The future tense in Pothwari is formed by adding -s as opposed to the Eastern Punjabi gā.

This tense is also used in other western Punjabi dialects such as, Shahpuri, Jhangochi, Awankari, Chacchi, Dhanni, as well as in and Hindko and Saraiki.

English	Pahari-Pothwari		Eastern Punjabi	
English	transliteration	Shahmukhi	transliteration	Shahmukhi
I will do	mãi karsā̃	مَیں کرساں	mãi karāngā	مَیں کرانگا
we will do	asā̃ karsā̃	اَساں کرساں	asī̃ karānge	اَسِیں کرانگے
you will do (s)	tū̃ karsãi	تُوں کرسَیں	tū̃ karãigā	تُوں کریں گا
you will do (p)	tusā̃ karso	تُساں کرسو	tusī̃ karoge	تُسِیں کروگے
he/she will do	ó karsi	اوه کَرسی	ó karega	اوه کرے گا
they will do	ó karsan	اوہ کرسن	ó karaṇge	اوه کرݨ گے

This type of future tense was also used by classical Punjabi poets. Punjabi poet Bulleh Shah sometimes uses a similar form of future tense in his poetry:

Shahmukhi: جو کُجھ کرسَیں, سو کُجھ پاسَیں

Transliteration: jo kujh karsãĩ, so kujh pāsãĩ

Translation: whatsoever you do, is what you shall gain

==== Continuous tense ====
Similar to other Punjabi varieties, Pothwari uses peyā (past tense form of pēṇā) to signify the continuous tense.

==== Present Continuous ====
English	Pahari-Pothwari	
English	transliteration	Shahmukhi
I am doing (m.)	mē̃ karnā peyā ā̃̀	میں کرنا پیا ہاں
we are doing (m./mixed)	asā̃ karne pa'e ā̃̀	اساں کرنے پئے ہاں
you are doing (sing., m.)	tū̃ karna peya aĩ̀	تُوں کرنا پیا ہیں
you are doing (sing., f.)	tū̃ karnī paī aĩ̀	تُوں کرنی پئی ہیں
you are doing (plural, m./mixed)	tusā̃ karne pa'e ò	تُساں کرنے پئے ہو
he is doing	ó karna peya aì	اوہ کرنا پیا ہے
she is doing	ó karnī paī aì	اوہ کرنی پئی ہے
they are doing (m.)	ó karne pa'e ìn	اوہ کرنے پئے ہِن
they are doing (f.)	ó karniyā̃ paiyā̃ ìn	اوہ کرنیاں پئیاں ہِن

==== Past continuous ====
The past tense in Pothwari resembles that of Eastern Punjabi, however depending on the dialect, there may be slight variations.

English	Pahari-Pothwari	Standard Punjabi
I was doing (m.)	میں کرنا پیا ساں maĩ karna pya sã	میں کردا پیا ساں maĩ karda pya sã
we were doing (m./mixed)	اساں کرنے پئے سیاں/ساں	اسِیں کردے پئے ساں
you were doing (sing., m.)	تُوں کرنا پیا سیں	تُوں کردا پیا سیں
you were doing (pl., m./mixed or sing. formal)	تُساں کرنے پئے سیو/سو	تُسِیں کردے پئے سو
he was doing	اوہ کرنا پیا سا/سی	اوہ کردا پیا سی
she was doing	اوہ کرنی پئی سی	اوہ کردی پئی سی
they were doing (m./mixed)	اوہ کرنے پئے سے/سن	اوہ کردے پئے سن
they were doing (f.)	اوہ کرنِیاں پئیاں سِیاں/سن	اوہ کردِیاں پئیاں سن

The place of "pyā" may sometimes be switched with respect to the verb. This is common in Majhi (e.g: Noor Jehan's "chann māhi teri rāh pyi takkni ãã) and as well as in Jhangochi, Shahpuri, etc

"tusā̃ báhū̃ changā kamm karne ò pa'e", meaning "you (plural/sing. formal) are doing a very good thing"

"mē̃ vī tā̃ éhe gall ākhnā peyā sā̃", meaning "I was also saying the same thing"

"mē̃ vī tā̃ ehe gall ākhnā peyā ā̃̀", meaning "I am also saying the same thing"

=== Post-positions ===
These are typically the same in Pothohari and Standard Punjabi, but some differences can be noted.

==== Adverbs and post-positions ====
Adverbs and post-positions
English	Pothohari	Standard Punjabi
which (relative)	جہڑا	جہڑا
which (interrogative)	کہڑا	کہڑا
if	جے	جے
and	تے	تے
near	نیڑے	نیڑے
distant	پرھاں	پرھاں
before / previously	اگّے	اگّے
hence / thus	تاں مارے	تاں کرکے
exactly why	تاں ای	تاں ای
first	پہلوں	پہلوں / پہلاں
once	اِکّ واری	اِکّ واری
now	ہُن	ہُن
just now	ہُنے / میسں	ہُنے
right at that time	اوسے ویلے	اوسے ویلے
sometimes	کدے	کدے / کدی
somewhere	کِرے / کُرے	کِتّے / کِدھرے
when	کدوں	کدوں
like this (adv.)	ایوں / اِنج / اِسراں	ایوں / اِنج / اِس طرحاں
like this (adj.)	ایہے جیہا	ایہو جیہا
exactly this / only this	ایہے	ایہو
above	اَپّر	اُتّے / اُپّر
below	تھلّے / بُن	تھلّے
from below	تھلّوں	تھلّوں
right	سجّے	سجّے
left	کھبّے	کھبّے
within	وِچّ	وِچّ
from within	وِچّّوں	وِچّوں
between	وِشکار	وِچکار
from	توں / سوں / کولں	توں / کولوں
from the front	اگّوں	اگّوں
from behind	پِچھوں، مگروں	پِچھوں، مگروں
in comparison	کولوں / نالوں	کولوں / نالوں
with (utility)	نال	نال
furthermore	نالے	نالے
yet / still	حالے / اجے	حالے / اجے
with (possession)	کول	کول
along / including	سݨے	سݨے
ٰeverywhere	چوہاں پاسے	چوہاں پاسے
properly	چنگی طرحاں	چنگی طرحاں
harshly	ڈاہڈا	ڈاہڈا
with ease	سوکھا	سوکھا
with difficulty	اوکھا	اوکھا
lest	متے	متاں / کِتے ایہہ نہ ہووے
who knows	خورے	خورے
very	بہُوں	(بہوں is used in most Western Punjabi dialects)
enough	بتیرا	بتھیرا / بتیرا
less	گھٹّ	گھٹّ
alone	کلھیوں	کلھیاں
together	کٹھّیوں	کٹھّیاں
again	مُڑی تے	مُڑکے
repeatedly	مُڑی مُڑی	مُڑ مُڑ
eventually	ہَولے ہَولے	ہَولی ہَولی
quickly	بہلی	چھیتی
this much (quality.)	ایڈا	ایڈا
this much (quantity.)	ہیتݨاں	اِنّا
alright / okay / oh	ہلا	اچّھا

Note:

- Some Majhi subdialects do use کٹھّیوں for کٹھّیاں
- Standard Punjabi makes use of اُپّر
- In Pahari-Pothohari مسیں means now, while in other dialects مسیں / مساں means "barely/hardly"
- The pronunciation وِشکار is not unique to Pahari-Pothohari alone
- The word and expression ہلا / Hala is common throughout Western Punjab, also used in Majhi

==== Genitive marker ====
The genitive marker in Pahari-Pothwari is represented through the use of nā (ਨਾ / نا) as opposed to dā (ਦਾ / دا) in all other Punjabi dialects.

- The phrase: lokkā̃ dā (ਲੋਕਾਂ ਦਾ / لوکاں دا), meaning "people's" or "of the people" in Pahari-Pothwari, would become lokkā̃ nā (ਲੋਕਾਂ ਨਾ / لوکاں نا)

It should also be noted that in Pahari-Pothwari, the present form of verb does not end with the standard dā sound either, and is replaced with nā. This means that ākhdā would be ākhnā in Pahari-Pothwari meaning "to say" and similarly the word takkdā would be takknā in Pahari-Pothwari meaning "to look/to watch".

English	Pothohari	Majhi	Jhangochi
we come	اساں اچھنے آں	اسِیں آؤنے آں	اسِیں آنے آں
what do you say?	تُوں کے آخنا ایں؟	تُوں کی آکھدا ایں؟	تُوں کی آہیندا ایں؟
the things I do	جہڑے کمّ میں کرنا آں	جہڑے کمّ میں کرنا آں	جہڑے کمّ میں کرنا/کریٔنا آں

For example:

- miki eh nih si cāhinā (میکی ایہہ نِیہ سی چاہینا), meaning "this is not what I wanted"
- oh kai pyā ākhnā ae? (اوہ کے پیا آخنا ہے؟), meaning "what is he saying?"
- This also affects the common Punjabi passive tense: is tarhā̃ nih ākhī nā (اِس طرحاں نہیں آخی نا), instead of "ākhee dā", meaning "that's not how it should be said"

==== Dative and definite object marker ====
The dative and definite object marker in Pothwari is kī (ਕੀ /کی) as opposed to nū̃ (ਨੂੰ / نوں) in standard Punjabi.

The phrase: lokkā̃ nū̃ (ਲੋਕਾਂ ਨੂੰ / لوکاں نوں), meaning "to the people" in standard Punjabi, would become lokkā̃ kī (ਲੋਕਾਂ ਕੀ / لوکاں کی) in Pothwari.

=== Adjectives ===
Adjectives
English	Pothohari	Majhi
difficult	اوکھا	اوکھا
easy	سَوکھا	سَوکھا
small	نِکّا	نِکّا
large	بڑا / بڈّا	وڈّا
unfamiliar	اوپرا	اوپرا
new	نوَاں	نوَاں
old	پراݨاں	پراݨاں
straight	سِدھّا	سِدھّا
inverted	پُٹھّا	پُٹھّا
crooked	ڈِنگّا	ڈِنگّا
high	اُچّا	اُچّا
low	نِیواں	نِیواں
good	چنگا	چنگا
bad	ماڑا / مندا	ماڑا / مندا
very bad	بھَیڑا	بھَیڑا
heavy	بھارا	بھارا
light (weight)	ہَولا	ہَولا
narrow	سَوڑا	سَوڑا
open	کھُلھّا	کھُلھّا
firm	پِیڈا	پِیڈا
loose	ڈھِلّا	ڈھِلّا
late	چِرکا	چِرکا
on time	ویلے نال	ویلے نال
red	رتّا لال	رتّا لال
crimson	سُوہا کھٹّ	سُوہا کھٹّ
white	چِٹّا دُدھّ	چِٹّا دُدھّ
black	کالا شاہ	کالا شاہ
yellow	پِلّا زرد	پِلّا زرد
sweet	مِٹھّا	مِٹھّا
bitter	کَوڑا	کَوڑا
slow	مٹھّا	مٹھّا
well	بلّ	ولّ
empty	سکھّݨاں	سکھّݨاں
filled	بھریا	بھریا
dry	سُکّا / آٹھریا	سُکّا / آٹھریا
wet	گِلّا / بھِجّا	گِلّا / بھِجّا
hot	تتّا	تتّا
cold	ٹھڈّا	ٹھنڈا
hungry	بھُکھّا	بھُکھّا
fed	رجّیا پُجّیا	رجّیا پُجّیا
smart	سیاݨا	سیاݨا
fool	جھلّا	جھلّا
deep	ڈُونگھا	ڈُونگھا
beautiful	سوہݨاں	سوہݨاں
ugly	کوجھا	کوجھا
evil	لُچّا	لُچّا
faux naïf	مِیسݨا	مِیسݨا

=== Tribal groupings ===
Pahari-Pothwari speakers belong to the same tribes as found in the rest of Punjab. While the names of the tribes remain the same, the Standard Punjabi word for tribe birādrī/barādarī (برادری) becomes bilādrī/balādarī (بلادری) in Pahari-Pothwari and several other Punjabi dialects such as Jhangochi and Shahpuri.

=== Numbering system ===
Pahari-Pothwari follows the numbering traditions of standard Punjabi. A point of departure from eastern Punjabi dialects occurs in the use of trai (ترَے) instead of tinn (تِنّ) for "three". Other western Punjabi dialects also tend to use trai over tinn.

Similarly, Pothwari, Majhi and other western Punjabi dialects use "yārā̃" (یاراں) for "gyarā̃" (گیاراں), "trei" (ترئی) for "tei" (تئی) "panji" (پنجِی) for "pachchi" (پچّی) and "trih" (ترِیہہ) for "tih" (تِیہہ), for the numbers 11, 23, 25, and 30.

Unlike Jhangochi, Shahpuri and Ghebi/Awankari/Dhanni, Pothohari does not use "dāh" for 10, and instead uses "das" as in Eastern Punjabi and Urdu/Hindi.

English		Pahari-Pothwari		
numbers	numerals	transliteration	Shahmukhi	numerals
one	1	ikk	اِکّ	۱
two	2	do	دو	۲
three	3	trai	ترَے	۳
four	4	chār	چار	۴
five	5	panj	پَنج	۵
six	6	che	چھے	۶
seven	7	satt	سَتّ	۷
eight	8	aṭṭh	اَٹّھ	۸
nine	9	nau	نَو	۹
ten	10	das	دَس	۱۰

==== Ordinals ====
The ordinal numbers are largely the same. The only difference occurs in the words for "second" and "third". The former is dūwā (دووا) in Pothwari, whilst it is dūjjā (دوجا) in Standard Punjabi; the latter is trēyā (تریا) in Pothwari whilst it is tējjā (تیجا) in Standard Punjabi. Western Punjabi in general tends to follow this trend.

English	Pahari-Pothwari		Standard Punjabi		Jatki	
ordinals	Shahmukhi	transliteration	Shahmukhi	transliteration	Shahmukhi	transliteration
first	پہلا	pehlā	پہلا	pehlā	پہلا	pehlā
second	دووا	dūwā	دوجا	dūjjā	دووا / دُوجا	dūwā / dūjjā
third	تریا	trīyā	تیجا	tījjā	ترِجیا	trījjā
fourth	چوتھا	chautthā	چَوتھا	chautthā	چَوتھا	chautthā

== Vocabulary ==
=== General verbs ===
A majority of the general verbs between Pothohari and most other dialects of Punjabi appear to be the same.

Pahari-Pothwari general verbs
English	Pothohari	Majhi
taking out	کڈھّݨا	کڈھّݨا
taking off	لاہݨا	لاہُݨا
applying	لاݨا	لاؤݨا
decreasing	گھٹّݨا	گھٹّݨا
jumping	چھال مارنی	چھال مارنی
agreeing	منّݨا	منّݨا
hesitating	جھکّݨا	جھکّݨا
forgetting	بھُلّݨا	بھُلّݨا
wearing / pouring	باݨا	پاؤݨا
lying / to be poured	پَیݨا	پَیݨا
sitting	بہݨا	بہݨا
breaking	بھنّݨا یا تروڑنا	بھنّݨا
returning	موڑنا	موڑنا
flipping	پرتاݨا	پرتاؤݨا
seeing	تکھّݨا	تکّݨا یا ویکھݨا
to be seen	دِسّݨا	دِسّݨا
telling	دسّݨا	دسّݨا
saying	آخݨا	آکھݨا
running	نسّݨا	نسّݨا
falling	ڈھیہݨا	ڈھہݨا یا ڈِگّݨا
slipping	تِلکݨا	تِلکݨا
chewing	چِتھّݨا	چِتھّݨا
coughing	کھنگھݨا	کھنگھݨا
raising	چاڑھنا	چاڑھنا
coming	اچھݨا	آؤݨا
walking	ٹُرنا	ٹُرنا
pulling	چھِکّݨا	چھِکّݨا / کھِچّݨا
passing	لنگھّݨا	لنگھّݨا
capturing	مَلّݨا	مَلّݨا
cooling	ٹھارنا	ٹھارنا
obtaining	لبھّݨا	لبھّݨا
lighting up	بالݨا	بالݨا
cooking	رِنھّݨا	رِنھّݨا
tying	بنھّݨا	بنھّݨا
roasting	بھُنّݨا	بھُنّݨا
slaughtering	کوہݨا	کوہݨا
identifying	سیاݨنا	سیاݨنا
throwing	سٹّݨا	سُٹّݨا / سٹّݨا
losing	ہرنا	ہرنا
entering	بڑنا	وڑنا
crumbling	بھورنا	بھورنا
covering	کجّݨا	کجّݨا
dividing	ونڈݨا	ونڈݨا
stuffing / thrusting	تُنّݨا	تُنّݨا
pressing	منڈݨا	منڈݨا
vexing	کھپاݨا	کھپاؤݨا
spreading	کھِلارنا	کھِلارنا
to be stolen	کھُسّݨا	کھُسّݨا
blowing	پھُوکݨا	پھُوکݨا
dusting off	چھنڈݨا	چھنڈݨا
mixing	رلݨا	رلݨا
drying	سُکّݨا	سُکّݨا
hanging	لمکݨا	لمکݨا
boiling	کاڑھنا	کاڑھنا
spilling	ڈولھݨا	ڈولھݨا
shining	لِشکݨا	لِشکݨا
plastering / coating	لِنبݨا	لِنبݨا
maintaining	سانبھݨا	سانبھݨا
taking along	کھڑنا	کھڑنا یا لَےجاݨا

Note:

- Eastern Majhi and Malvai use khichchna for pulling, while western Majhi, Jhangochi, Shahpuri, Pothohari use chhikkna.
- Eastern dialects will use bhann-toṛ and tuṭṭ-bhajj, while western dialects like Pothohari use bhann-troṛ and truṭṭ-bhajj.
- saṭṭna for throwing is used in Western dialects, and chāna for picking (as opposed to suṭṭna / chukkna), though Pothohari may use chukkna as well.
- Pothohari verbs do not seem to involve the -āvna or -āuna sound. This is similar to certain Majhi sub-dialects.
- labbhna is used for obtaining and receiving as in most dialects of Punjabi, however it is often not used in the active sense. For this Pothohari prefers loṛna. (The passive form of this word "loṛīnda" is commonly used in standard Punjabi)
- The Pothohari word for grabbing and holding is nappṅa (common in all Punjabi dialects) and lapaṛna (unique verb)

==== The passives remain the same throughout Punjabi dialects ====
- bhanṅa (to break) and bhajjṅa (to be broken)
- bhunṅa (to roast) and bhujjṅa (to be roasted)
- rinnhṅa (to cook) and rijjhṅa (to be cooked)
- dolhṅa (to spill) and dullhṅa (to be spilt)
- lāhṅa (to take off) and lehṅa (to descend/come off)
- laveṛna (to besmear) and livaṛna (to be besmeared)

==== The irregular past tense remains the same throughout Punjabi dialects ====
Differences in brackets.

- khādhā
- pītā
- dittā
- kītā
- suttā
- moeā
- seāṅtā (Jhangochi/Shahpuri: seātā, Majhi: seāṅeā)
- latthā
- ḍhaṭṭhā
- baddhā
- nahātā
- dhotā
- khaltā (in other dialects: khalotā) e.g.: miki saṛke apar khalteon addhā ghantā hoi gya sā
- baṅtā (in other dialects: baṅeā) e.g.: chāʼ kadū̃ ni banti hoi ae
- guddhā

==== nā and khā̃ (emphatics) ====
Used throughout Punjabi dialects (e.g.: Majhi, Jhangochi, etc.)

- gall suṅeṉ na "please listen"
- gall suṅ khā̃ "listen up!"

Word for sleep

Forms of the verb to sleep
English	Pothohari	Jhangochi / Shahpuri	Majhi
to sleep	سَیݨا	سَوݨا سن٘وݨا	سَوݨا
has slept	سئی ریہا	سَیں پیا سَیں ریہا	سَوں گیا
he is sleeping	اوہ سَیݨا اے پیا	اوہ سَوندا اے پیا	اوہ سَوندا اے پیا
asleep	سُتّا پیا	سُتّا پیا	سُتّا پیا
having slept / while asleep	سُتّیوں	سُتّیاں	سُتّیاں
after sleeping	سئی تے	سَیں کے (or تے)	سَوں کے
go to sleep	سئی گو سئی جا سئی روہ	سَیں پو سَیں جا سَیں روہ	سَوں جا
he is to sleep	اوہ سئے	اوہ سَون٘وے	اوہ سَون٘وے
putting to sleep	سن٘واولݨا	سن٘واوݨا	سن٘واؤݨا

=== Family relations ===
The names of family relations are mostly the same throughout the Punjabi dialects.

Relations
English	Pothohari
English	Shahmukhi
mother, father	ماں پیو
son, daughter	دھِیاں پُتّر
brother, sister	بھَیݨاں بھرا
elder brother	بھاپا
husband	گھر الا / جݨا / خسم
wife	گھر آلی / زنانی
grandsons, granddaughters (from son)	پوترے پوترِیاں
grandsons, granddaughters (from daughter)	دوترے دوترِیاں
son-in-law	جوائی
daughter-in-law	نوں٘ہہ
mother-in-law	سسّ
father-in-law	سوہرا
husband's sister	نناݨ
sister's husband	بھݨوئیا
brother's wife	بھرجائی
father's brother, father's sister	چاچا / پُپھّی
father's brother's wife	چاچی
father's sister's husband	پُھپھّڑ
mother's brother, mother's sister	ماما / ماسی
mother's brother's wife	مامی
mother's sister's husband	ماسڑ
cousin from father's brother	چچیر / داد پوترا
cousin from father's sister	پھُپھیر
cousin from mother's brother	ملویر
cousin from mother's sister	مسیر

Some words unique to Pothohari include:

- dād-potrā to refer to a cousin (son of father's brother, potrā is a common Punjabi word)
- be for mother (eastern Punjabi uses be-be for mother)
- bhāpā for brother (sometimes used in eastern Majhi)

=== Body part names ===
Names of body parts are the same throughout Punjabi dialects with minimal differences.

Body parts
English	Pothohari	Jhangochi / Shahpuri	Majhi
eyes	اکھِّیاں	اکھِّیاں / اکھِیں	اکھّاں
head	سِر	سِر	سِر
forehead	متھّا	متھّا	متھّا
eyelashes	پِمݨِیاں	پِپّݨیاں	پلکاں
eyebrows	بھروٹّے	بھربِٹّے	بھروٹّے
eyelids	چھپّر	چھپّر	چھپّر
eyeballs	آنّے	آنّے	آنّے
ears	کنّ	کنّ	کنّ
arms	باہاں	باہِیں	باہواں
throat	سنگھ	سگّھ	سنگھ
neck	دھَوݨ	دھَوݨ	دھَوݨ
shoulders	موڈھے	موڈھے	موڈھے
elbow	ارک	ارک	ارک
nails	نَونہہ	نَونہہ	نَونہہ
hands	ہتھّ	ہتھّ	ہتھّ
fingers	انگلاں	انگلاں	اُنگلاں
belly	ڈھِڈّ	ڈھِڈّ	ڈھِڈّ
waist	لکّ	لکّ	لکّ
legs	لتّاں	لتّاں	لتّاں
knees	گوڈے	گوڈے	گوڈے
ankles	گِٹّے	گِٹّے	گِٹّے
feet	پَیر	پَیر	پَیر
palm	تلّی	تلّی	تلّی
teeth	دند	دند	دند
molars	ہݨیوں	ہݨیوں	جاڑھاں
tongue	جِیبھ	جِبھّ	جِیبھ
nose	نکّ	نکّ	نکّ
nostrils	ناساں	ناساں	ناساں
face	مونہہ	مونہہ	مونہہ
back	کنڈ	کنڈ	کنڈ
hips	ڈھاکاں	ڈھاکاں	ڈھاکاں
hip bone	چُوکݨا	چُوکݨا	چُوکݨا

=== Words for "coming" and "going" ===
The Pahari-Pothwari word for "coming" is acchṇā, whereas for "going" gacchṇā, julṇā and jāṇā are used.

English	Pahari-Pothwari	Jatki	Standard Punjabi
English	Shahmukhi	Shahmukhi	Shahmukhi
I am coming	میں اچھنا پیا ہاں	میں آوندا پیا ہاں	میں آوندا پیا ہاں
I am going	میں گچھنا پیا ہاں میں جُلنا پیا ہاں	میں ویندا پیا ہاں میں جاوندا پیا ہاں	میں جاندا پیا ہاں
I don't understand	میکی سمجھ نِیہ اچھنی پئی	مینُوں سمجھ نہیں آوندی پئی	مینُوں سمجھ نہیں آوندی پئی
I will leave tomorrow	میں کلّ گیساں میں کلّ جُلساں	میں کلّھ ویساں میں کلّھ جاساں	میں کلّھ جاواں گا
we are going for work	اساں کمّے اپّر جُلے ہاں	اسِیں کمّ تے چلے ہاں	اسِیں کمّ تے چلے ہاں
it happens	ہوئی گچھنا ہے ہوئی جُلنا ہے ہوئی جانا ہے	ہو ویندا ہے ہو جاوندا ہے	ہو جاندا ہے
sit down	بہی جُل بہی گچھ بہی جا	بہہ ونج بہہ جا	بہہ جا
I will take him along	اُسکی وی نال گھِنی گیساں اُسکی وی نال گھِنی جُلساں	اوہنُوں وی نال لے ویساں/جاساں اوہنُوں وی نال گھِن ویساں	اوہنُوں وی نال لَے جاواں گا

The imperative for gacchṇā is both gacch and gau.

=== Causative verbs ===
Pahari-Pothwari causative verbs end with -ālnā. This feature also exists in the eastern Majhi dialect. (e.g.: vikhālṇā)

English	Pahari-Pothwari	Standard Punjabi	Jatki
to cause to eat	کھوالݨا	کھواوݨا	کھواوݨا
to cause to drink	پیالݨا	پیاوݨا	پِواوݨا
to cause to bathe	نہوالݨا	نہواوݨا	نہواوݨا
to cause to wash	دھوالݨا	دھواوݨا	دھواوݨا
to cause to cry	رووالنا	رواوݨا	رواوݨا
to cause to sleep	سوالݨا	سواوݨا	سواوݨا
to cause to sit	بہالݨا	بہاوݨا	بہاوݨا
to cause to stand	اُٹھالݨا	اُٹھاوݨا	اُٹھاوݨا

Not all causative verbs are formed like this, e.g. to play -kheṛṇā to khaṛāṇa,

=== Words used for "taking" and "bringing" ===
Commonly observed in the Lahnda dialects is the use of ghinṇā (گھِننا) and ānṇā (آننا) instead of the eastern Punjabi words laiṇā (لَینا) and lyāṇā (لیانا).

Notice how ghin āo becomes ghini achho, and ghin ghidā becomes ghini ghidā in accordance with Pothwari grammar and vocabulary.

English	Pahari-Pothwari	Jatki	Hindko	Saraiki
English	Pahari-Pothwari	Shahpuri/Jhangochi	Hindko	Saraiki
from tomorrow onwards, I'll also bring it for you, just cope for today	کلّ سوں میں تُساں کی وی آݨی دِتّا کرساں، اجّ گُزارہ کری گھِنو	کلّ توں میں تُہانُوں وی لیا دِتّا کرساں، اجّ گُزارہ کر لوو	کلّ توں میں تُساں آں وی آݨ دیا کرساں، اجّ گُزارہ کر گھِنو	کلّ توں میں تُہاکُوں وی آݨ ڈِتّا کریساں، اجّ گُزارہ کر گھِنو
take him along as well	اُسکی وی نال گھِنی اچھو	اوہنُوں وی نال لَے آوو	اُساں وی نال گھِن آؤ	اُوکُوں وی نال گھِن آوو
they took it from me as well	اُنھاں مھاڑے کولُوں وی گھِنی گھِدا	اُنھاں میرے کولُوں وی لَے لیا	اُنھان مڑھے کولُوں وی گھِن گھِدا	اُنھاں میڈے کولُوں وی گھِن گھِدا
he is bringing	اوہ آݨنا پیا ہے	اوہ لیاندا پیا ہے	اوہ آݨدا پیا ہے	اوہ اݨیندا پیا ہے
we will also have to bring them back	اُنھاں کی واپس وی آݨنا ہوسی	اُنھاں نُوں واپس وی لیاوَݨا ہوسی	اُنھاں آں واپس وی آݨنا ہوسی	اُنھاں کُوں واپس وی آݨنا ہوسی
eat it	کھائی گھِن	کھا لَے	کھا گھِن	کھا گھِن
bring it brought it	چائی آݨو چائی آݨنا	چا لیاؤ چا لیاندا	چا آݨو چا اݨدا	چا آݨو چا اݨیندا
take it took it	چائی گھِنو چائی گھِدا	چا لوو چا لیا	چا گھِنو چا گھِدا	چا گھِنو چا گھِدا
he will take him along	اوہ اِسکی نال گھِنی گیسی/ جُلسی/ جاسی	اوہ ایہنُوں نال لَے ویسی اوہ ایہنُوں لے جاسی	اوہ اِساں نال گھِن جُلسی	اوہ اِیکُوں نال گھِن ویسی

=== Interrogative words ===
English	Pahari-Pothwari	Jatki	Standard
why	کِیاں	کیوں	کیوں
where	کتھے	کِتھّے	کِتھّے
whither	کُدھّر	کِدّے	کِدّھر
who	کُݨ	کَوݨ	کَوݨ
what?	کے؟	کیہ / کی	کی / کِیہ

=== Pahari-Pothwari vocabulary similarities with other western Punjabi dialects ===
English	Pahari-Pothwari	Jatki	Hindko	Saraiki
very / much	بُہو	بہُوں	بہُوں	بہُوں
go to sleep	سئی گو	سَیں ونج	سَیں جُل	سم ونج
alright / okay	ہلا	ہلا	ہلا	ہلا
boy	جاکت / جاتک	جاتک / چھوہر	جندک	چھُوہر
what is his name?	کے ناں اُسنا؟	کیہ/کے ناں اُس؟	کے ناں اُس؟	کیا ناں اُس؟
take	گھِنو	لَوو (جھنگوچی/شاہپُوری) گھِنو (دھنی)	گھِنو	گھِنو
bring	آݨو	لیاوو (جھنگوچی/شاہپُوری) آنو (دھنی)	آنو	آنو
he speaks like us	اوہ اساں آر بولنا اے	اوہ ساڈے آر بولیندا اے	اوہ اساں آر بولدا اے	اوہ ساڈے آر الیندا اے
let's go	آ جُلِیَے	آ چلِیئے/جُلِیے	آ جُلاں	آ جُلُوں
lift / raise	چاؤ	چاوو	چاؤ	چاوو
life	حیاتی	حیاتی	حیاتی	حیاتی

== Bibliography ==
- 1981 District Census Report of Rawalpindi. Vol. 44. Islamabad: Population Census Organization, Statistics Division, Government of Pakistan. 1984. p. 95.
- Abbasi, Muhammad Gulfraz (2010). "Is It a Language Worth Researching?". Language in India. 10 (7).
- Abbasi, Muhammad Gulfraz; Asif, Saiqa Imtiaz (2010). "Dilemma of Usage and Transmission-A Sociolinguistic Investigation of Dhundi-Pahari in Pakistan". Language in India. 10 (5): 197–214. ISSN 1930-2940.
- Akhtar, Raja Nasim; Rehman, Khawaja A. (2007). "The Languages of the Neelam Valley". Kashmir Journal of Language Research. 10 (1): 65–84. ISSN 1028-6640.
- Baart, Joan L. G. (2003). Sustainable Development and the Maintenance of Pakistan's Indigenous Languages. Islamabad.
- Bhat, Javeed Ahmad (2014). Politics of Reservations: A Comparative Study of Gujjars and Paharis of Jammu and Kashmir (PhD). Aligarh Muslim University. hdl:10603/167183.
- Grierson, George A. (1919). Linguistic Survey of India. Vol. VIII, Part 1, Indo-Aryan family. North-western group. Specimens of Sindhī and Lahndā. Calcutta: Office of the Superintendent of Government Printing, India.
- Hussain, Serena (2015). "Missing From the 'Minority Mainstream': Pahari-speaking Diaspora in Britain". Journal of Multilingual and Multicultural Development. 36 (5): 483–497. doi:10.1080/01434632.2014.953539. ISSN 0143-4632. S2CID 55100616.
- Kaul, Pritam Krishen (2006). Pahāṛi and Other Tribal Dialects of Jammu. Vol. 1. Delhi: Eastern Book Linkers. ISBN 8178541017.
- Kour, Updesh (2014). "Punchi". In Devy, G. N.; Koul, Omkar N. (eds.). The Languages of Jammu & Kashmir. People's linguistic survey of India. Vol. 12. New Delhi: Orient Blackswan. pp. 261–78. ISBN 978-81-250-5516-7.
- Lothers, Michael; Lothers, Laura (2010). Pahari and Pothwari: A Sociolinguistic Survey (Report). SIL Electronic Survey Reports. Vol. 2010–012.
- Lothers, Laura; Lothers, Michael (2012). Mirpuri Immigrants in England: A Sociolinguistic Survey. SIL Electronic Survey Reports 2012. SIL International.
- Masica, Colin P. (1991). The Indo-Aryan languages. Cambridge language surveys. Cambridge University Press. ISBN 978-0-521-23420-7.
- Shackle, Christopher (1979). "Problems of Classification in Pakistan Panjab". Transactions of the Philological Society. 77 (1): 191–210. doi:10.1111/j.1467-968X.1979.tb00857.x. ISSN 0079-1636.
- Shackle, Christopher (1983). "Language, Dialect and Local Identity in Northern Pakistan". In Wolfgang-Peter Zingel; Stephanie Zingel-Avé Lallemant (eds.). Pakistan in Its Fourth Decade: Current Political, Social and Economic Situation and Prospects for the 1980s. Mitteilungen des Deutschen Orient-Instituts. Vol. 23. Hamburg: Deutsches Orient-Institut. pp. 175–87.
- Shackle, Christopher (2007). "Pakistan". In Simpson, Andrew (ed.). Language and National Identity in Asia. Oxford linguistics Y. Oxford University Press. ISBN 978-0-19-922648-1.
- Shackle, Christopher (1980). "Hindko in Kohat and Peshawar". Bulletin of the School of Oriental and African Studies. 43 (3): 482–510. doi:10.1017/S0041977X00137401. ISSN 0041-977X. S2CID 129436200.
- Simons, Gary F.; Fennig, Charles D., eds. (2017). "Pahari-Potwari". Ethnologue (20 ed.). (access limited).
- Singh, Kuljit (2014). Identity Formation and Assertion: A Study of Pahari Speaking Community of Jammu and Kashmir (PhD). University of Jammu. hdl:10603/78359.
