= Gebi =

Gebi may refer to:

- Gēbì, the Chinese name of the Gobi Desert
- Gebi, Georgia, a village in the country of Georgia
- Gebi language (disambiguation), several languages
- Gebi railway station, on the Chinese Qingzang Railway
- Mike Gebhardt "Gebi" (born 1965), US windsurfer
- Aliyu Ibrahim Gebi (born 1975), Nigerian politician

== See also ==
- Menelik Palace, formerly known as Gebbi, a palace in Addis Abeba, Ethiopia
- Ghebi dialect, a dialect of Hindko spoken in Pakistan
