= Yuri Andreyevich Smirnov =

Yuri Andreyevich Smirnov (Russian: Юрий Андреевич Смирнов, usually initialized as Ю.А. Смирнов, 12 March 1923 – 17 February 1984) was a Soviet linguist.

Smirnov was born in Vladikavkaz in March 1923, and, after finishing college, he joined the army. After the Second World War he left the army and was admitted to the Institute of Oriental Studies of the USSR Academy of Sciences in linguistics, where he was primarily interested in the Punjabi language, on which he later wrote his doctoral thesis. After getting his Ph.D., Smirnov visited India in 1985 as a linguist, where he continued to study languages. His interest in the Saraiki language led him to learn some of it from immigrants from the region where it is spoken. In 1986 he presented a report of his research in Patiala University, which published the report. The head of the Punjabi department, Sirbinder Singh, declared Smirnov's research on compound sentences in Punjabi to be extraordinary, and praised it as an important addition to the field of Punjabi grammar, etymology, and syntax.

In 1970, Smirnov published The Lahndi Language, a book about Lahndi, which in 1975 was translated into English and published in Moscow. This book has been criticised as an "uneasy amalgamation" of previous work by Grierson and Bahri, and the language described in it has been characterised as "an unreal composite of Multani and Awankari."

In 1978, Smirnov was awarded a doctorate of literature. His thesis paper was called “Theoretical Discoveries in Punjabi Language”. In addition to this work, Smirnov worked on the theoretical and linguistic problems in the Indo-Aryan languages. Smirnov is considered to be a specialist in Saraiki, Dogri, Punjabi, and Rajasthani languages.

Smirnov died in February 1984 at the age of 60.

== Works ==
- Smirnov U.A., The Composite Sentence (Compound and Complex Sentences), Main Problems, Panjab University, Chandigarh, 1966.
- Smirnov U.A., Язык ленди, Moscow, 1970 (in Russian).
- Smirnow U.A., Discovery of One More Tone in Punjabi and of Pharyngealization of the Known Falling Tone, – «Parkh», vol. XI. Panjab University, Chandigarh (India), 1973.
- Smirnov U.A., The Lahndi Language, Moscow, 1975.
- Smirnov U.A., Basic Grammatical Features of the Dogri Language, – «Nations of Asia and Africa», No. 2, 1975 (in Russian).
- Smirnov U.A., Punjabi Grammar, Moscow, 1976 (in Russian).
