= Punjabi grammar =

Indo-Aryan language native to the region of Punjab of Pakistan and India

Punjabi is an Indo-Aryan language native to the region of Punjab of Pakistan and India and spoken by the Punjabi people. This page discusses the grammar of Modern Standard Punjabi as defined by the relevant sources below (see #Further reading).

== History of study ==
=== Precursors ===
Grammar is known as pañjābī viākarana in Punjabi. Sikh exegesis and hermeneutics dates back to the period of the Sikh gurus and was developed further by sects and traditions like the Bhais, Udasis, Minas, Nirmalas, and Gianis. An early sample of such a kind of Sikh grammatical work are three glossary manuscripts known as Paryaye that are preserved in the Bavarian State Library in Munich. These manuscripts were collected by Ernest Trumpp during his time at Lahore in 1871. The Singh Sabha movement would introduce Western approaches and scientific methods to the study of language and literature, including grammar.

=== Colonial period ===
The earliest Western studies on the Punjabi language was mostly conducted by Christian missionary organisations, such as the Serampore Mission Press and the later Ludhiana Mission Press, who produced translations, grammars, and dictionaries, being facilitated by the colonial administration. The purpose of such work was primarily for teaching and translation based upon previous work which had been conducted on either Sanskrit or English (such as in regards to categories and word-class). According to Jeffrey M. Diamond, the Christian missionaries had a better understanding of Punjabi linguistics than the colonial administrators. Scientific study of Punjabi grammar dates back to 1812 with the publication of a grammar work by William Carey. However, according to Sahar Afshar it was actually published in early 1813 despite the year 1812 being its colophon. Carey's work was not viewed as useful by his contemporaries. In 1838, another grammar book on Punjabi with the same title as the 1812 work by Lieutenant John Leech of the Bombay Engineers, was published. Leech's Punjabi grammar book utilizes romanized Punjabi, with some Devanagari and Perso-Arabic usage as well. Leech must have published his grammar book without knowledge of the previous Punjabi grammar book of the same name that had earlier been published by William Carey. This publication was followed in 1849 by yet another grammar book on Punjabi by Captain Samuel Cross Starkey, whom was a British Colonial Officer in India. Starkey's grammar book only employs romanized Punjabi with no usage of native scripts.

Research into Punjabi grammar was spear-headed by the Ludhiana Mission as a grammatical understanding of the local vernacular was needed for the training of Christian missionaires and colonial administrators. The mission found the previous grammatical works by Carey and Leech as not being helpful and lacking. Instead, they focused on using European and American categories for understanding Punjabi grammatical terms and phrases. They mostly utilized the Punjabi variety spoken in the Ludhiana area. The mission's works focused on comparing Punjabi with Urdu, as much of the readers or target audience had a background in using Urdu. The Ludhiana Mission Press, under the supervision of Reverend James Porter, published a grammar book on Punjabi by John Newton, titled A Grammar of the Panjabi Language; With Appendices in 1851. The motivation for publishing this grammar book was due to the aftermath of the annexation of much of Punjab in 1849 after the downfall of the Sikh Empire resulting from the Second Anglo-Sikh War. Many British colonial officials, only familiar with Urdu, began coming into Punjab after the 1849 annexation, so this work attempts to instruct them in the local Punjabi-language. Newton's Punjabi grammar book does make explicit mention of the previous grammar book that was written by William Carey, however whilst being sympathetic, Newton does note inaccuracies in Carey's earlier work. Newton's grammar book focuses mostly on how Punjabi grammar differs from Urdu grammar, rather than being solely dedicated to the comprehensive study of Punjabi's grammar itself. Newton's grammar book is divided into two main partitions: orthography and orthoepy (including syntax), with these main sections being divided into smaller parts based on adjectives, nouns, adverbs, pronouns, interjections, conjunctions, verbs, etc. Newton's Punjabi grammar book would later be republished in 1866, owing to its acclaim and popularity. John Beames included Punjabi in his three-volume work on the grammar of northern Indian languages in 1872, also covering Punjabi in an 1875 work. Wilson (1899) also composed an early analysis.

Later up until 1916, many foreign and native scholars analyzed the language's grammar, most notably George Abraham Grierson of the Linguistic Survey of India (in 1916 and 1919), while other grammar works were authored by E. P. Newton (1896, focusing on literary Punjabi) and Cummings and Bailey (1912, focusing on oral Punjabi). Bailey (1904, 1914, 1926) composed a number of works on tones in Punjabi. Most of these studies focused on teaching the language, sometimes including a list of vocabulary but a lack of phonological and grapholinguistic analyses (instead relying upon semiphonetic Romanization), with the inclusion of the eight parts of speech (nouns, pronouns, adjectives, verbs, adverbs, prepositions, conjunctions, and interjections), and each one was an improvement over the former, with eventually a distinction being made between oral and written Punjabi. Noun morphology was characterized better than verbs and challenging grammatical concepts (such as finite verb tenses) were showcased using example sentences. Colonial-era native grammarians included Ram Singh (1924), Karam Singh Gangawala (1935), and Banarsi Das Jain (1935).

=== Post-independence ===
In the post-independence period, further studies on Punjabi grammar were conducted by Piara Singh Padam (1954), Duni Chandra (1959), Sant Singh Sekhon (1961), Bahl (1969, 1974), the Linguistic Atlas of the Punjab (1973), Masica (1993), Gurbachan Singh Sidhu (2004), Bahl (1957, 1969), Gill (1960, 1962), Arun (1961), Gleason (1962), Vatuk (1964), Clivio (1966), Singh (1971), Bhatia (1975, 1993), Grainger (1980), Tolstaya (1981), Sandhu (1986), Dulai (1989), Malik (1995), Shackle (2003), Dhillon (2010), Bowden (2012), Kanwal & Ritchart (2015), Hussain (2015, 2017, 2019), Bhardwaj (2016), Evans (2018), Chanchal Singh, Baldev Singh Cheema, Paramjit Singh Sidhu, Kanwaljit Kaur, G. K. S. Sekhon, Ved Agnihotri, Buta Singh, Paramjit Singh Walia, Sukhwinder Sangha, Narinder Dulai, Ujjal Singh Bahri, Christopher Shackle, Motia Bhatia, Sita Ram Bahri, O. N. Koul, S. S. Joshi, Madhu Bala, Khokhlova and B. R. Gupta. Furthermore, studies were sponsored by educational and government institutions, such as the Languages Department of Patiala. Harjeet Singh Gill and Henry Allan Gleason produced a pivotal reference grammar on the language, as a mimeograph in 1963 and it being published as a book later in 1969. For dialectal grammar, B. S. Sandhu created a descriptive grammar covering Puadhi while Janak Raj Sharma made one for Doabi. Joginder Singh Puar also published a work on Punjabi grammar, specifically on topics like verbs, passivisation, verbal phrases, and clauses. Chanchal Singh conducted research on syntax following Halliday's functional model. Punjabi Bhasha Academy published three volumes on Punjabi grammar for graduate studies. The Soviet linguist Yuri Andreyevich Smirnov published a work on Punjabi grammar in 1976 covering phonology, morphology, and syntax. Harkirat Singh was the first grammarist to adopt and apply Chomsky's method to Punjabi. Lakhvir Singh used Hudson's grammar model while Joga Singh opted for the G.B. model. Grainger (1980) was the first articulatory study on Punjabi using palatography. An acoustic and articulatory description of Punjabi consonants was carried out by Sandhu (1986). A study involving articulatory variation in the realization of dental and retroflex nasals using ultrasound-imaging was undertaken by Kochetov et al. (2019). Research on tonogenesis and acoustic/articulatory description of stop laryngeal and place contrasts in Punjabi is being carried out by Qandeel Hussain. Tej K. Bhatia published a work on the language's grammar in 1993. More recent grammars include Bhardwaj (2016) and Bashir & Conners (2019).

Various grammatical theories and models have yet to be applied to Punjabi in research. According to Kali Charan Bahl (2016), a proper grammatical study of Punjabi is yet to be undertaken, with him stating:

The above noted discussion about the various uses of the term Panjabi sufficiently illustrates the fact that the grammatical tradition of the language still lacks a scientific basis. It relies quite heavily on popular beliefs and assumptions, though it will not be found to be radically different in the depth of its generalizations and coverage from the grammars of some other major Indo-Aryan languages which also suffer from similar defects.

— Kali Charan Bahl, Linguistics in South Asia (De Gruyter, 21 November 2016), Panjabi, p. 157

Scientific study of dialectal phonology has mostly been conducted on eastern Punjabi varieties, such as by scholars Jain (1934), Arun (1961), Gill and Gleason (1962), Singh (1971), Dulai and Koul (1980), Bhatia (1993), Malik (1995), Shackle (2003), and Dhillon (2010). A few scholars who have researched the phonology of western Punjabi varieties include the likes of Bahri (1962) and Baart (2003, 2014). A recent Pakistani author in the field is Safdar Ali Shah, who wrote a work covering Shahmukhi Punjabi in Pakistan. Hussain (2020) covers Lyallpuri dialect's phonology in-depth. Bashir & Conners (2019) covers Pakistani Punjabi. A grammar checking system has been developed for Punjabi.

== Word order ==
Punjabi is an SOV language, having a canonical word order of subject–object–verb and has postpositions, rather than prepositions.

== Transliteration ==
In matters of script, Punjabi uses Gurmukhi and Shahmukhi. On this page, Punjabi is written in "standard orientalist" transcription as outlined in Masica (1991:xv) (with one change; representing ai /ɛː/ and au /ɔː/ with ē and ō respectively). Being "primarily a system of transliteration from the Indian scripts, [and] based in turn upon Sanskrit" (cf. IAST), these are its salient features: subscript dots for retroflex consonants; macrons for etymologically, contrastively long vowels; h denoting aspirated plosives. Tildes denote nasalized vowels, and grave and acute accents denote low and high tones, respectively.

Vowels and consonants are outlined in the tables below. The vowel table shows the character used in the article (ī) followed by its IPA value in forward slashes (ex. /iː/). See Punjabi phonology for further clarification.

Vowels
	Front		Near-front		Central		Near-back		Back	
	IPA	script	IPA	script	IPA	script	IPA	script	IPA	script
Close	iː	ਈ اِی							uː	ਊ اُو
Near-close			ɪ	ਇ اِ			ʊ	ਉ اُ		
Close-mid	eː	ਏ اے							oː	ਓ او
Mid					ə	ਅ اَ				
Open-mid	ɛː	ਐ اَے							ɔː	ਔ اَو
Open					aː	ਆ آ				

Consonants
		Labial		Dental/ Alveolar		Retroflex		Post-alv./ Palatal		Velar		Glottal	
		IPA	script	IPA	script	IPA	script	IPA	script	IPA	script	IPA	script
Nasal		m	ਮ م	n	ਨ ن	ɳ	ਣ ݨ	ɲ	ਞ ن٘ج	ŋ	ਙ ن٘گ		
Plosive/ Affricate	tenuis	p	ਪ پ	t	ਤ ت	ʈ	ਟ ٹ	t͡ʃ	ਚ چ	k	ਕ ک		
Plosive/ Affricate	aspirated	pʰ	ਫ پھ	tʰ	ਥ تھ	ʈʰ	ਠ ٹھ	t͡ʃʰ	ਛ چھ	kʰ	ਖ کھ		
Plosive/ Affricate	voiced	b	ਬ ب	d	ਦ د	ɖ	ਡ ڈ	d͡ʒ	ਜ ج	ɡ	ਗ گ		
Fricative	voiceless	(f)	(ਫ਼ ف)	s	ਸ س			ʃ	ਸ਼ ش	(x)	(ਖ਼ خ)		
Fricative	voiced			(z)	(ਜ਼ ز)					(ɣ)	(ਗ਼ غ)	ɦ	ਹ ہ
Rhotic				ɾ~r	ਰ ر	ɽ	ੜ ڑ						
Approximant		ʋ	ਵ و	l	ਲ ل	ɭ	ਲ਼ لؕ	j	ਯ ی				

== Morphology ==
=== Nouns ===
Punjabi distinguishes two genders, two numbers typically with an additional dual form for a small set of nouns, and six cases of direct, oblique, vocative, ablative, locative, and instrumental. The latter three cases are essentially now vestigial: the ablative occurs only in the singular in free variation with oblique case and an ablative postposition, and the locative and instrumental are confined to a small set of common nouns. Numeral adjectives do also have locative plural forms, and toponymic proper nouns often have a locative singular form. Nouns may be further divided into extended and unextended declensional subtypes, with the former characteristically consisting of masculines ending in unaccented -ā and feminines in -ī.

Nouns are gendered or non-gendered, with gendered nouns being determined by selection or derivation, with gendered nouns being diminutive or non-diminutive and feminine or non-feminine. Number consists of plural (more than one) and non-plural (numeric non-committal). Cases are mostly irregular and non-productive.

The following tables displays the suffix paradigms, as outlined in Shackle (2003:600–601). Regarding the masculine, "the [extended] case-morphemes, very similar to those of the unextended declension, are added to the obl. base -e-, which is shortened to -i- (phonetically [e̯]) before back vowels and is lost before front vowels." The division between feminine unextendeds and extendeds ending in -ī seems to be now merely an etymological consideration, as there is no distinct oblique base or any morphophonemic consideration.

Masculine
		Dir.	Obl.	Voc.	Abl.	Loc./ Instr.
unEx.	Sing.			+ā +ਆ +آ	+ȭ +ਓਂ +ؤں	+ē +ਏ +ئے
unEx.	Pl.		+ā̃ +ਆਂ +آں	+ō +ਓ +ؤ		+ī̃ +ਈਂ +ئِیں
Ex.	Sing.	-ā -ਆ -آ	-ē -ਏ -ئے	-iā -ਇਆ -یا	-iȭ -ਇਓਂ -یوں	-ē -ਏ -ئے
Ex.	Pl.	-ē -ਏ -ئے	-iā̃ -ਇਆਂ -یاں	-iō -ਇਓ -یو		-ī̃ -ਈਂ -ئِیں

Feminine
	Dir.	Obl.	Voc.	Abl.	Loc./ Instr.
Sing.			-/+ē -/+ਏ -/+ئے	+ȭ +ਓਂ +ؤں	+ē +ਏ +ئے
Pl.	+ā̃ +ਆਂ +آں		+ō +ਓ +ؤ		+ī̃ +ਈਂ +ئِیں

The following table of noun declensions shows those suffix paradigms in action. Words, from Shackle (2003:600–601): ghṑṛā "stallion", sakhī "girlfriend", ghàr "house", gall "thing, matter (being talked about)".

Extended
		Dir.	Obl.	Voc.	Abl.	Loc./ Instr.
Masc.	Sing.	ghṑṛā ਘੋੜਾ گھوڑا	ghṑṛe ਘੋੜੇ گھوڑے	ghṑṛiā ਘੋੜਿਆ گھوڑیا	ghṑṛiȭ ਘੋੜਿਓਂ گھوڑیوں	(ghṑṛe) (ਘੋੜੇ) (گھوڑے)
Masc.	Pl.	ghṑṛe ਘੋੜੇ گھوڑے	ghṑṛiā̃ ਘੋੜਿਆਂ گھوڑیاں	ghṑṛiō ਘੋੜਿਓ گھوڑیو		
Fem.	Sing.	sakhī ਸਖੀ سَکھی		sakhīē ਸਖੀਏ سَکِھیے		
Fem.	Pl.	sakhīā̃ ਸਖੀਆਂ سَکِھیاں		sakhīō ਸਖੀਓ سَکِھیو		

Unextended
		Dir.	Obl.	Voc.	Abl.	Loc./ Instr.
Masc.	Sing.	ghàr ਘਰ گَھر		ghàrā ਘਰਾ گَھرا	ghàrȭ ਘਰੋਂ گَھروں	ghàrē ਘਰੇ گَھرے
Masc.	Pl.	ghàr ਘਰ گَھر	ghàrā̃ ਘਰਾਂ گَھراں	ghàrō ਘਰੋ گَھرو		ghàrī̃ ਘਰੀਂ گَھرِیں
Fem.	Sing.	gall ਗੱਲ گَلّ		(gallē) (ਗੱਲੇ) (گَلّے)	gallȭ ਗੱਲੋਂ گَلّوں	gallē ਗੱਲੇ گَلّے
Fem.	Pl.	gallā̃ ਗੱਲਾਂ گَلّاں		gallō ਗੱਲੋ گَلّو		gallī̃ ਗੱਲੀਂ گَلِّیں

=== Adjectives ===
Adjectives may be divided into declinable and indeclinable categories. Declinable adjectives have endings that change by the gender, number and case of the noun that they qualify. Declinable adjective have endings that are similar but much simpler than those of nouns:

			Sing.	Pl.
Declin.	Masc.	Dir.	-ā -ਆ -آ	-ē -ਏ -ئے
Declin.	Masc.	Obl.	-ē -ਏ -ئے	-ē, -iā̃ -ਏ, -ਇਆਂ -ئے، -یاں
Declin.	Fem.		-ī -ਈ -ئی	-īā̃ -ਈਆਂ -ئِیاں
Indeclin.				

Indeclinable adjectives are invariable and can end in either consonants or vowels (including ā and ī ). The direct masculine singular (-ā) is the citation form. Most adjectives ending in consonants are indeclinable.

Declinable adjective caṅgā "good" in attributive use

		Dir.	Obl.	Voc.	Abl.	Loc./ Instr.
Masc.	Sing.	caṅgā ghṑṛā ਚੰਗਾ ਘੋੜਾ چَنگا گھوڑا	caṅgē ghṑṛē ਚੰਗੇ ਘੋੜੇ چَنگے گھوڑے	caṅgē ghṑṛiā ਚੰਗੇ ਘੋੜਿਆ چَنگے گھوڑیا	caṅgē ghṑṛiȭ ਚੰਗੇ ਘੋੜਿਓਂ چَنگے گھوڑیوں	(caṅge ghṑṛē) (ਚੰਗੇ ਘੋੜੇ) (چَنگے گھوڑے)
Masc.	Pl.	caṅgē ghṑṛē ਚੰਗੇ ਘੋੜੇ چَنگے گھوڑے	caṅgiā̃ ghṑṛiā̃ ਚੰਗਿਆਂ ਘੋੜਿਆਂ چَنگیاں گھوڑیاں	caṅgi'ō ghṑṛiō ਚੰਗਿਆਂ ਘੋੜਿਓ چَنگیو گھوڑیو		
Fem.	Sing.	caṅgī sakhī ਚੰਗੀ ਸਖੀ چَنگی سَکھی		caṅgī sakhīē ਚੰਗੀ ਸਖੀਏ چَنگی سَکِھیے		
Fem.	Pl.	caṅgīā̃ sakhīā̃ ਚੰਗੀਆਂ ਸਖੀਆਂ چَنگِیاں سَکِھیاں		caṅgīā̃ sakhīō ਚੰਗੀਆਂ ਸਖੀਓ چَنگِیاں سَکِھیو		

		Dir.	Obl.	Voc.	Abl.	Loc./ Instr.
Masc.	Sing.	caṅgā ghàr ਚੰਗਾ ਘਰ چَنگا گَھر	caṅgē ghàr ਚੰਗੇ ਘਰ چَنگے گَھر	caṅgē ghàrā ਚੰਗੇ ਘਰਾ چَنگے گَھرا	caṅgē ghàrȭ ਚੰਗੇ ਘਰੋਂ چَنگے گَھروں	caṅgē ghàrē ਚੰਗੇ ਘਰੇ چَنگے گَھرے
Masc.	Pl.	caṅge ghàr ਚੰਗੇ ਘਰ چَنگے گَھر	caṅgiā̃ ghàrā̃ ਚੰਗਿਆਂ ਘਰਾਂ چَنگیاں گَھراں	caṅgiā̃ ghàrō ਚੰਗਿਆਂ ਘਰੋ چَنگیاں گَھرو		caṅgiā̃ ghàrī̃ ਚੰਗਿਆਂ ਘਰੀਂ چَنگیاں گَھرِیں
Fem.	Sing.	caṅgī gall ਚੰਗੀ ਗੱਲ چَنگی گَلّ		(caṅgī gallē) (ਚੰਗੀ ਗੱਲੇ) (چَنگی گَلّے)	caṅgī gallȭ ਚੰਗੀ ਗੱਲੋਂ چَنگی گَلّوں	caṅgī gallē ਚੰਗੀ ਗੱਲੇ چَنگی گَلّے
Fem.	Pl.	caṅgīā̃ gallā̃ ਚੰਗੀਆਂ ਗੱਲਾਂ چَنگِیاں گَلّاں		caṅgīā̃ gallō ਚੰਗੀਆਂ ਗੱਲੋ چَنگِیاں گَلّو		caṅgīā̃ gallī̃ ਚੰਗੀਆਂ ਗੱਲੀਂ چَنگِیاں گَلِّیں

Indeclinable adjective xarāb "bad" in attributive use

		Dir.	Obl.	Voc.	Abl.	Loc./ Instr.
Masc.	Sing.	xarāb ghṑṛā ਖ਼ਰਾਬ ਘੋੜਾ خَراب گھوڑا	xarāb ghṑṛē ਖ਼ਰਾਬ ਘੋੜੇ خَراب گھوڑے	xarāb ghṑṛiā ਖ਼ਰਾਬ ਘੋੜਿਆ خَراب گھوڑیا	xarāb ghṑṛiȭ ਖ਼ਰਾਬ ਘੋੜਿਓਂ خَراب گھوڑیوں	(xarāb ghṑṛē) (ਖ਼ਰਾਬ ਘੋੜੇ) (خَراب گھوڑے)
Masc.	Pl.	xarāb ghṑṛē ਖ਼ਰਾਬ ਘੋੜੇ خَراب گھوڑے	xarāb ghṑṛiā̃ ਖ਼ਰਾਬ ਘੋੜਿਆਂ خَراب گھوڑیاں	xarāb ghṑṛiō ਖ਼ਰਾਬ ਘੋੜਿਓ خَراب گھوڑیو		
Fem.	Sing.	xarāb sakhī ਖ਼ਰਾਬ ਸਖੀ خَراب سَکھی		xarāb sakhīē ਖ਼ਰਾਬ ਸਖੀਏ خَراب سَکِھیے		
Fem.	Pl.	xarāb sakhīā̃ ਖ਼ਰਾਬ ਸਖੀਆਂ خَراب سَکِھیاں		xarāb sakhīō ਖ਼ਰਾਬ ਸਖੀਓ خَراب سَکِھیو		

		Dir.	Obl.	Voc.	Abl.	Loc./ Instr.
Masc.	Sing.	xarāb ghàr ਖ਼ਰਾਬ ਘਰ خَراب گَھر	xarāb ghàr ਖ਼ਰਾਬ ਘਰ خَراب گَھر	xarāb ghàrā ਖ਼ਰਾਬ ਘਰਾ خَراب گَھرا	xarāb ghàrȭ ਖ਼ਰਾਬ ਘਰੋਂ خَراب گَھروں	xarāb ghàrē ਖ਼ਰਾਬ ਘਰੇ خَراب گَھرے
Masc.	Pl.	xarāb ghàr ਖ਼ਰਾਬ ਘਰ خَراب گَھر	xarāb ghàrā̃ ਖ਼ਰਾਬ ਘਰਾਂ خَراب گَھراں	xarāb ghàrō ਖ਼ਰਾਬ ਘਰੋ خَراب گَھرو		xarāb ghàrī̃ ਖ਼ਰਾਬ ਘਰੀਂ خَراب گَھرِیں
Fem.	Sing.	xarāb gall ਖ਼ਰਾਬ ਗੱਲ خَراب گَلّ		(xarāb gallē) (ਖ਼ਰਾਬ ਗੱਲੇ) (خَراب گَلّے)	xarāb gallȭ ਖ਼ਰਾਬ ਗੱਲੋਂ خَراب گَلّوں	xarāb gallē ਖ਼ਰਾਬ ਗੱਲੇ خَراب گَلّے
Fem.	Pl.	xarāb gallā̃ ਖ਼ਰਾਬ ਗੱਲਾਂ خَراب گَلّاں		xarāb gallō ਖ਼ਰਾਬ ਗੱਲੋ خَراب گَلّو		xarāb gallī̃ ਖ਼ਰਾਬ ਗੱਲੀਂ خَراب گَلِّیں

All adjectives can be used attributively, predicatively, or substantively. Those used substantively are declined as nouns rather than adjectives. Finally, additional inflections are often marked in colloquial speech: feminine singular vocative nī sóṇīē kuṛīē! "hey pretty girl!".

=== Postpositions ===
The aforementioned inflectional case system goes only so far on its own but rather serves as that upon which is built a system of particles, known as postpositions, which parallel English's prepositions. Their use with a noun or verb requires the noun or verb to take the oblique case, and they are the locus of grammatical function, or "case-marking"

	Transliteration	Gurmukhi	Shahmukhi	NotesMay use dē
Used alone	dā	ਦਾ	دا	genitive marker; declines like an adjective. Example: "X dā/dī/etc. Y" means "X's Y", with dā/dī/etc. agreeing with Y.
Used alone	nū̃	ਨੂੰ	نُوں	marks the indirect object (dative marker), or, if definite, the direct object (accusative marker).
Used alone	nē	ਨੇ	نے	ergative case marker; applicable to subjects of transitive perfective verbs.
Used alone	tō̃	ਤੋਂ	توں	ablative marker, "from"
Used alone	vall	ਵੱਲ	وَلّ	orientative marker; "towards"
Used alone	takk, tāī̃	ਤੱਕ, ਤਾਈਂ	تَکّ، تائِیں	terminative marker, "until, up to"
Used alone	vikhē	ਵਿਖੇ	وِکھے	locative marker, "at (a specific location)", e.g. Hōshiārpur vikhē, "at Hoshiarpur" (a city). Often colloquially replaced with 'tē
May use a secondary preposition	vicc	ਵਿੱਚ	وِچّ	inessive marker, "in." Often contracted to 'c
May use a secondary preposition	nāḷ	ਨਾਲ਼	نالؕ	comitative marker, "with"
May use a secondary preposition	uttē	ਉੱਤੇ	اُتّے	superessive marker, "on" or "at." Often contracted to 'tē
May use a secondary preposition	kōḷ	ਕੋਲ਼	کولؕ	possessive marker; "with" (as in possession) e.g. kuṛī (dē) kōḷ, "in the girl's possession."
May use a secondary preposition	bārē	ਬਾਰੇ	بارے	"about"
May use a secondary preposition	laī	ਲਈ	لَئی	benefactive marker; "for"
May use a secondary preposition	vargā	ਵਰਗਾ	وَرگا	comparative marker; "like" (in resemblance)
May use a secondary preposition	vāngū, vāng	ਵਾਂਗੂ, ਵਾਂਗ	وانگُو، وانگ	comparative marker; "like" (in manner)
May use a secondary preposition	tarh̤ā̃ (tárā̃)	ਤਰ੍ਹਾਂ	طَرْحاں	comparative marker; "like" (non-specific)
May use a secondary preposition	duāḷē	ਦੁਆਲ਼ੇ	دوالؕے	"around, surrounding" ex. manjē (de) duāḷē, "around the bed."
May use a secondary preposition	binnā̃, bājhō̃	ਬਿੰਨਾਂ, ਬਾਝੋਂ	بِنّاں، باجھوں	abessive marker; "without"
May use a secondary preposition	nēṛē	ਨੇੜੇ	نیڑے	"near"
May use a secondary preposition	lāgē	ਲਾਗੇ	لاگے	apudessive marker; "adjacent/next to"
May use a secondary preposition	vickār, gabbē	ਵਿਚਕਾਰ, ਗੱਬੇ	وِچکار، گَبّے	intrative marker, "between, middle of"
May use a secondary preposition	mājh (mā́j)	ਮਾਝ	ماجھ	"in the midst of"
May use a secondary preposition	andar	ਅੰਦਰ	اَن٘در	"inside"
May use a secondary preposition	bāhar (bā́r)	ਬਾਹਰ	باہر	"outside"

Other postpositions are adverbs, following their obliqued targets either directly or with the inflected genitive linker dē; e.g. kàr (dē) vicc "in the house", kṑṛe (dē) nāḷ "with the stallion". Many such adverbs (the ones locative in nature) also possess corresponding ablative forms by forming a contraction with the ablative postposition tȭ; for example:

- vicc "in" → viccȭ "from in, among", for instance, jantē (dē) viccȭ or jantē 'cȭ, "from among the people" and
- nāḷ "with"→ nāḷȭ "compared to", for instance, kṑṛē (dē) nāḷȭ, "compared to the stallion."

=== Pronouns ===
==== Personal ====
Punjabi has personal pronouns for the first and second persons, while for the third person demonstratives are used, which can be categorized deictically as near and remote. Pronouns do not distinguish gender.

The language has a T-V distinction in tū̃ and tusī̃. This latter "polite" form is also grammatically plural.

	1st pn.		2nd pn.	
	Sing.	Pl.	Sing.	Pl.
Direct	mẽ ਮੈਂ مَیں	asī̃ ਅਸੀਂ اَسِی	tū̃ ਤੂੰ تُوں	tusī̃ ਤੁਸੀਂ تُسی
Ergative (Oblique)	mẽ ਮੈਂ مَیں	asā̃ ਅਸਾਂ اَساں	tẽ ਤੈਂ تَیں	tusā̃ ਤੁਸਾਂ تُساں
Dative	mennū̃ ਮੈਨੂੰ مَینُوں	sānnū̃ ਸਾਨੂੰ سانُوں	tennū̃ ਤੈਨੂੰ تَینُوں	tuā̀nnū̃ ਤੁਹਾਨੂੰ تُہانُوں
Ablative	metthȭ ਮੈਥੋਂ مَیتھوں	sātthȭ ਸਾਥੋਂ ساتھوں	tetthȭ ਤੈਥੋਂ تَیتھوں	tuā̀tthȭ ਤੁਹਾਥੋਂ تُہاتھوں
Genitive	mērā, mērē, mērī, mērīā̃ ਮੇਰਾ, ਮੇਰੇ, ਮੇਰੀ, ਮੇਰੀਆਂ میرا، میرے، میری، میرِیاں	sāḍḍā, sāḍḍē, sāḍḍī, sāḍḍīā̃ ਸਾਡਾ, ਸਾਡੇ, ਸਾਡੀ, ਸਾਡੀਆਂ ساڈا، ساڈے، ساڈی، ساڈِیاں	tērā, tērē, tērī, tērīā̃ ਤੇਰਾ, ਤੇਰੇ, ਤੇਰੀ, ਤੇਰੀਆਂ تیرا، تیرے، تیری، تیرِیاں	tuā̀ḍḍā, tuā̀ḍḍē, tuā̀ḍḍī, tuā̀ḍḍīā̃ ਤੁਹਾਡਾ, ਤੁਹਾਡੇ, ਤੁਹਾਡੀ, ਤੁਹਾਡੀਆਂ تُہاڈا، تُہاڈے، تُہاڈی، تُہاڈِیاں

	Demonstrative				Relative		Interrogative	
	Near		Remote		Relative		Interrogative	
	Sing.	Pl.	Sing.	Pl.	Sing.	Pl.	Sing.	Pl.
Direct	ḗ ਇਹ ایہہ		ṓ ਉਹ اوہ		jō, jin ਜੋ, ਜਿਨ جو، جن		koṇ, kin ਕੌਣ, ਕਿਨ کوݨ، کن	
Oblique	is, ēs ਇਸ, ਏਸ ایس	ḗnnā̃ ਇਹਨਾਂ ایہناں	us, ōs ਉਸ, ਓਸ اوس	ṓnnā̃ ਉਹਨਾਂ اوہناں	jī, jis ਜੀ, ਜਿਸ جی، جس	jḗnnā̃ ਜਿਹਨਾਂ جہناں	kī, kis ਕੀ, ਕਿਸ کی، کس	kḗnnā̃ ਕਿਹਨਾਂ کہناں

The dative & ablative personal pronouns are analyzed as the oblique forms merging with suffixes, e.g. tusā̃ + nū̃ > tuhānū̃.

Unlike other pronouns, genitive pronouns essentially function in a manner similar to regular adjectives, declining in agreement with their direct objects. Moreover, koṇ and jō are colloquially replaced by kḗṛā "which?" jḗṛā "which". Indefinites include kōī (obl. kisē) "some(one)" and kújj "some(thing)". The reflexive pronoun is āp, with a genitive of āpṇā. The pronominal obl. -nā̃ also occurs in ik, iknā̃ "some", hōr, hōrnā̃ "others", sáb, sábnā̃ "all".

==== Derivates ====
Based on table in Shackle (2003:604). Indefinites are extended forms of the interrogative set; e.g. kite "somewhere", kade "sometimes". The multiple versions under certain categories are dialectal variations.

		Interrogative	Relative	Demonstrative	
		Interrogative	Relative	Near	Remote
Date		kiddaṇ	jiddaṇ		oddaṇ
Time	Regular	kad	jad	huṇ	tad
Time	Emphatic	kade	jade	huṇe	tade
Time	Emphatic	kádī	jádī	húṇī	tádī
Time	Ablative (Note: In some dialects, these ablative forms for Time replace the regular ones.)	kadõ	jadõ	eddõ	oddõ
Time	Ablative	kadõ	jadõ	eddõ	tadõ
Place	Regular	kitthe	jitthe	etthe	otthe
Place	Ablative	kitthõ	jitthõ	etthõ	otthõ
Direction	Regular	kíddar	jíddar	éddar	óddar
Direction	Ablative	kíddrõ	jíddrõ	éddrõ	óddrõ
Manner (Note: The third row of Manner may have been derived from the emphatic forms of Reason.)		kiddā̃	jiddā̃	eddā̃	oddā̃
Manner		kiñj	jiñj	eñj	oñj
Manner		kivẽ	jivẽ	evẽ	ovẽ
Reason		kyõ	jyõ	eõ	oõ
Quality (Note: Quality, Quantity and Magnitude are declinable.)		kío jíā	(jío) jíā	éo jíā	óo jíā
Quantity		kinnā	jinnā	ennā	onnā
Magnitude		kiḍḍā	jiḍḍā	eḍḍā	oḍḍā

The demonstrative prefixes e and o vary from [ɪ~e~ɛ] and [ʊ~o~ɔ] respectively (resulting in varied spellings).

==== Pronominal suffixes ====
Some varieties of the Majhi dialect of Punjabi (documented thus far in Lahore, and the Gujrat district) have pronominal suffixes that are appended to verbs, and which replace dropped pronominal arguments.

Person	Singular	Plural
2	-ī	-jē
3	-s(ū)	-ne

=== Verbs ===
==== Overview ====
The Punjabi verbal system is can be described largely in terms of aspect and mood. Most Punjabi verbs do not inflect for tense—the only verb which does is the copular verb ਹੈ / ہے. Some linguists have described aspectual forms of Punjabi verbs as being inflections for tense; however, this assessment is flawed as these verb forms can be used the same way in sentences which refer to any time with respect to the situation of the speaker or writer. Finite verbs mark voice category and can be inflected based upon aspect, mood, tense, gender, person, and number.

The copular verb has two tense forms which can be described as "remote" and "non-remote," as they indicate a metaphorical distance or closeness to the situation. "Past" and "present" can be understood as default assumptions for the times which the remote and non-remote tenses refer to respectively, however, these temporal references are not required of these tenses. Rather, time can largely be understood to exist extralinguistically in Punjabi. The remote forms of the copula, ਸੀ / سی, do not resemble the non-remote forms ਹੈ / ہے phonetically. The copula does not behave like a full lexical verb in Punjabi and does not form part of serial verb constructions; rather than taking on the meaning of the existential verb 'to be' or 'to become' ਹੋਣਾ / ہونٌا, it means 'being' without any aspectual component. The copula is also not obligatory in a Punjabi clause. A full lexical verb in Punjabi on the other hand, does exhibit grammatical aspect. Due the close meaning of ਹੋਣਾ / ہونٌا and the copula, they are sometimes described as forms of the same lexeme; however, because they are directly derived from two distinct Sanskrit words and do not function alike grammatically, they are better described as two different but complementary words.

Finite verbal agreement is with the nominative subject, except in the transitive perfective, where it can be with the direct object, with the erstwhile subject taking the ergative construction -ne (see postpositions above). The perfective aspect thus displays split ergativity.

Tabled below on the left are the paradigms for the major Gender and Number termination (GN), along the line of that introduced in the adjectives section. To the right are the paradigms for the Person and Number termination (PN), used by the subjunctive (which has 1st pl. -īe) and future (which has 1st pl. -ā̃).

(GN)	Sing.	Pl.
Masc.	-ā	-ē
Fem.	-ī	-īā̃

(PN)	1st.	2nd.	3rd.
Sing.	-ā̃	-ē~	-ē
Pl.	-ā̃/īē	-ō	-aṇ

==== Copula ====
The Punjabi copula functions as a class of its own and does not share the properties of full lexical verbs in the language, nor does it take on the role of an auxiliary verb. Unlike these other word classes, the copula does not form a part of verb phrases, and where it is present alongside a full verb construction it generally makes a semantic distinction related to the notion of existence, rather than predicating for the act of being. For this reason, it can be said that the Punjabi copula is not wholly verbal in function.

Number	Singular			Plural		
Person	1st	2nd	3rd	1st	2nd	3rd
Pronoun	mẽ	tū̃	ḗ/ṓ	asī̃	tusī̃	ḗ/ṓ
Present-tense copula	hā̃	hẽ	he	hā̃	hō	han
Past-tense copula	sā̃	sẽ	sī	sā̃	sō	san
Subjunctive copula	hōvā̃	hōvẽ	hōvē	hōvā̃	hōvō	hōṇ

- Two infrequent inflected forms of the present-tense copula he are haō (plural second person), distinguishing the standard hō for T-V distinction usage, and heṇ (plural third person). In addition, two past tense copulas, hesī and hesaṇ are used respectively with singular and plural forms of third persons. These forms, like the uninflected forms he and sī, can be used with both the genders.
- In the spoken language, the past tense copula sī can remain completely uninflected, and remain applicable for all three persons and both numbers. Some less frequently used forms of sī are saō, sāō, and sau, used as 2nd-person plural copulas, distinguishing the standard sō for T-V distinction usage.

Some non-standard major dialects such as Doabi decline the past-tense and present-tense copulas more along number and gender than for number and person:

Gender	Masculine		Feminine	
Number	Singular	Plural	Singular	Plural
Present-tense copula	hegā	hegē	hegī	hegīā̃
Past-tense copula	sīgā	sīgē	sīgī	sīgīā̃

===== Conjugations =====
Personal Forms of "hoṇā (to be)"
mood	tense	singular						plural					
mood	tense	1P – mẽ		2P – tū̃		3P – eh, oh		1P – asī̃		2P – tusī̃		3P – eh, oh	
mood	tense	m.	f.	m.	f.	m.	f.	m.	f.	m.	f.	m.	f.
indicative	present	hā̃		hẽ		he		hā̃		hō		han	
indicative	imperfect	sā̃		sẽ		sī		sā̃		sō		san	
indicative	perfect	hōyā	hōī	hōyā	hōī	hōyā	hōī	hōē	hōiyā̃	hōē	hōiyā̃	hōē	hōiyā̃
indicative	future	hōvā̃gā	hōvā̃gī	hōvē̃gā	hōvē̃gī	hōvēgā	hōvēgī	hōvā̃gē	hōvā̃giyā̃	hōvōgē	hōvōgiyā̃	hōwṇgē	hōwṇgiyā̃
presumptive	all	?	?	?	?	?	?	?	?	?	?	?	?
subjunctive	present	?		?		?		?		?		?	
subjunctive	future	hōvā̃		hōvē̃		hōvē		hōviye		hōvō		hōwṇ	
contrafactual	past	hōndā	hōndī	hōndō̃	hōndiyō̃	hōndā	hōndī	hōndē	hōndīā̃	hōndē	hōndīā̃	hōndē	hōndīā̃
imperative	present	—		hō		—		—		hōō		—	
imperative	future	—		hōī̃		—		—		hōyō		—	

==== Forms ====
The sample verb is intransitive naccṇā "to dance", and the sample inflection is 3rd. masc. sing. (PN = e, GN = ā) where applicable.

Non-aspectual
Aspectual
Non-finite

Root	*	nacc
Dir. Infinitive/ Gerund/ Obligatory	*-ṇ-ā	naccṇā
Obl. Infinitive	*-(a)ṇ	naccaṇ
Abl. Infinitive	*-ṇ-ȭ	naccṇȭ
Conjunctive	*-kē	nacckē
Agentive/ Prospective	*-(a)ṇ-hār(ā), *-(a)ṇ-vāḷ-GN	naccaṇhār(ā), naccaṇvāḷā

Adjectivals.
Perfective	*-GN hō-GN	nacciā hōiā
Imperfective	*-d-GN hō-GN	naccdā hōiā

Adverbial. Obl. of adjectival.
Imperfective	*-d-ē, -d-iā̃	naccdē, naccdiā̃

Finite

Contingent Future	*-PN	naccē
Definite Future	*-PN-g-GN	naccēgā

Imperatives.
	Sing.	Pl.
Present	nacc	naccō
Aorist	naccī̃	nacciō

Aspectuals plotted against copulas.
		Perfective	Habitual	Continuous
		*-(i)-GN	*-d-GN	* ráí-GN
Present	h-?	nacciā he	naccdā he	nacc ríā he / naccdā piā he
Past	s-?	nacciā sī	naccdā sī	nacc ríā sī / naccdā piā sī
Subjunctive	ho-v-PN	nacciā hōvē	naccdā hōvē	
Presumptive	ho-v-PN-g-GN	nacciā hōvēgā	naccdā hōvēgā	
Contrafactual	hun-d-GN	nacciā hundā	naccdā hundā	
Unspecified		nacciā	naccdā	

==== Light verbs ====
Similarly to Hindustani, Punjabi appends "light" or auxiliary verbs onto other verbs to nuance their meaning.

Light Verb	Explanation	Main Verb	Examples
jāṇā "to go"	Shows a sense of completeness of the action, finality, or change of state.	1. āoṇā "to come"; 2. khāṇā "to eat"; 3. marṇā "to die"; 4. pīṇā "to drink"; 5. bahiṇā "to sit"; 6. hoṇā "to happen"	1. ā jāṇā "to arrive" "to come over"; 2. khā jāṇā "to eat up (all/everything/completely)"; 3. mar jāṇā "to be dead"; 4. pī jāṇā "to drink up (all/everything/completely)" "to gulp"; 5. bahi jāṇā "to sit down"; 6. ho jāṇā "to happen (completely)"
laiṇā "to take" (dialectal: ghinṇā)	Suggests that the (usually planned/expected) action is completed and the benefit of the action flows towards the doer. This auxiliary verb can also be used to soften down the tone of imperatives (commands) and usually is used to give suggestions. Nuance of planned/expected action is not present.	1. vekhṇā "to see" "to look"; 2. karṇā; 3. mārṇā "to hit" "to kill"	1. vekh laiṇā "to take a look"; 2. kar laiṇā "to do (something fully for oneself)" "to have finished doing something"; 3. mār laiṇā "to (try to) kill (oneself)"
deṇā "to give"	Suggests that the (usually planned/expected) action was completed and the benefit of the action flows away from the doer. This auxiliary verb can also be used to soften down the tone of imperatives (commands) and usually is used to ask for favours. Nuance of planned/expected action is not present.	1. paṛhṇā; 2. mārṇā; 3. karṇā	1. paṛh denā "to read (for someone)" "to read out"; 2. mār deṇā "to kill", "to kill off", "to murder"; 3. kār deṇā "to do (something completely for someone else and not oneself)"
āoṇā "to come"	The meaning conveyed is the doer went somewhere to do something and came back after completing the action. This can also mean "to know how to" in the indefinite/habitual present tense – to know how to do: karnā ānā	1. karṇā	1. kar āoṇā "to finish (and come back)", "to do (and return)";

=== Tense ===
Punjabi tense forms consist of simple, paraphrastic, and defective, divided into past and non-past.

=== Sentence ===
Punjabi has three basic types of sentences, namely interjectional, impersonal, and subject/predicate.

=== Voice ===
Punjabi voice consists of personal and impersonal. Impersonal voice can be further divided into transitive and intransitive.

=== Aspect ===
Aspects consist of iterative-imperfective, perfective, and imperfective.

=== Mood ===
Mood is characterized by presumptive and injunctive, with injunctive being further divided into imperative and hortative.

== List of grammar works ==
=== In English ===
- A Grammar of the Punjabee Language (Serampore Mission Press, early 1813) by William Carey
- A Grammar of the Panjabee Language (Bombay: Bombay Government Press, 1838) by Robert Leech
- Idiomatic Sentences in English and Panjabi (Ludhiana: Lodiana Mission Press, 1846) by Levi Janvier
- A Dictionary, English and Punjabee, Outlines of Grammar, also Dialogues, English and Punjabee (Calcutta: D'Rozario & Co., 1849) by Samuel Cross Starkey
- A Grammar of the Panjabi Language; With Appendices (Ludhiana: Lodiana Mission Press, 1851) by John Newton
- Panjabi Grammar (Lahore: 1867) by Bihari Lal
- Grammar to the Ādi Granth (c. 1870s) by Ernest Trumpp
- John Beames:
  - A Comparative Grammar of the Modern Aryan Languages of India: To Wit, Hindi, Panjabi, Sindhi, Gujarati, Marathi, Oriya, and Bangali (London: Trubner and Co., 1872, Vol. I on sounds) by John Beames
  - A Comparative Grammar of the Modern Aryan Languages of India: To Wit, Hindi, Panjabi, Sindhi, Gujarati, Marathi, Oriya, and Bangali (London: Trubner and Co., 1875, Vol II on nouns and pronouns) by John Beames
  - A Comparative Grammar of the Modern Aryan Languages of India: To Wit, Hindi, Panjabi, Sindhi, Gujarati, Marathi, Oriya, and Bangali (London: Trubner and Co., 1879, Vol III on verbs) by John Beames
- A Short Punjabi Grammar: and An Appendix Containing Some useful technical Words in Roman Character (1883) by Henry Court
- History of the Sikhs ; or a translation of the Sikhān de Rāj di Vikhiā. With a short Gurmukhi Grammar (Lahore: Civil and Military Gazette Press, 1888) by Henry Court
- A Simplified Grammar and Reading Book of the Panjābī Language (London: Trübner & Co., 1889) by William St. Clair Tisdall
- Panjábí Grammar: With Exercises and Vocabulary (Ludhiana: Lodiana Mission Press, 1898) by Edward Payson Newton
- Grammar and Dictionary of Western Panjabi, as Spoken in the Shahpur District, With Proverbs, Sayings, & Verses (Lahore: Punjab Government Press, 1899) by James Wilson
- Panjabi Grammar: A Brief Grammar of Panjabi As Spoken in the Wazirabad District (Lahore: Punjab Government Press, 1904) by Thomas Grahame Bailey
- Panjabi Manual and Grammar: A Guide to the Colloquial Panjabi (1912) by Thomas Grahame Bailey and Thomas Fulton Cummings
- A Panjabi Phonetic Reader (London: University of London Press, 1914) by Thomas G. Bailey
- Linguistic Survey of India (1916 and 1919):
  - Linguistic Survey of India, Vol. IX: Indo-Aryan Family, Central Group, Part I: Specimens of Western Hindī and Pañjābī (Calcutta: Superintendent Government Printing, India, 1916) by George Abraham Grierson
  - Linguistic Survey of India, Vol. VIII: Indo-Aryan Family, North-Western Group, Part I: Specimens of Sindhī and Lahndā (Calcutta: Superintendent Government Printing, India, 1919) by George Abraham Grierson
- A Guide to Panjabi (1930) by Jawahir Singh
- A Phonology of Panjābī as Spoken about Ludhiana and a Ludhiānī Phonetic Reader (Lahore: University of the Panjab, 1934) by Banarsi Das Jain
- Bahl, Kali C. 1957. Tones in Punjabi. Indian Linguistics 17, 139–147.
- Gill, Harjeet S. 1960. Panjabi tonemics. Anthropological Linguistics 2(6), 11–18.
- Punjabi Manual and Grammar (Patiala: Languages Department, 1961)
- A Simplified Grammar and Reading Book of the Panjabi Language (New York: Frederick Ungar Publishing Company, 1961) by William St. Claire Tisdall
- A Comparative Phonology of Hindi and Punjabi (Ludhiana: Panjabi Sahitya Akademi, 1961) by Vidya B. Arun
- Lahndi Phonology, with Special Reference to Awánkárí (Allahabad: Bharati Press Prakashan, 1962) by Hardev Bahri
- A Reference Grammar of Punjabi (Hartford: Department of Linguistics, The Hartford Seminary Foundation, 1963) by Harjeet Singh Gill and Henry Allan Gleason (also published in 1962 by ERIC and in 1969 by Punjabi University)
- A Descriptive Grammar of Puadi, and the Tonal System of the Panjabi Language (Chandigarh: Panjab University, 1968) by Balbir Singh Sandhu
- Bahl, Kali C. 1969. Panjabi. In Thomas A. Sebeok (ed.), Linguistics in South Asia (Current Trends in Linguistics 5), 153–200. The Hague: Mouton.
- Some Aspects of the Generative Phonology of Punjabi (University of York, 1971) by Narinder Singh
- A Grammatical Analysis of the Panjabi Finite Verbal Phrase as Exemplified from 'gusal Khana Te Hor Lekh' (London: School of Oriental and African Studies, University of London, 1972) by Joginder Singh Puar
- Linguistic Atlas of Punjab (Patiala: Department of Anthropological Linguistics, Punjabi University, 1973)
- Bhatia, Tej K. 1975. The evolution of tones in Punjabi. Studies in the Linguistic Sciences 5(2), 12–24.
- Descriptive Grammar of Doabi (Phonetics and Mor-phemics) (Kurukshetra: Kurukshetra University, 1976) by Janak Raj Sharma
- Punjabi Phonetic Reader (Mysore: Central Institute of Indian languages, 1980) by Narinder K. Dulai & Omkar N. Koul
- The Panjabi Language: A Descriptive Grammar (originally written in Russian). London: Routledge & Kegan Paul, 1981) by T. I. Tolstaya, translated by George L. Campbell
- The Articulatory and Acoustic Structure of the Panjabi Consonants (Patiala: Publication Bureau, Punjabi University, 1986) by Balbir S. Sandhu
- A Pedagogical Grammar of Punjabi (Patiala: Indian Institute of Language Studies, 1989) by Narinder K. Dulai
- The Panjabi Verb: Form and Function (Patiala: Punjabi University, 1990) by Joginder Singh Puar
- Punjabi: A Cognitive-Descriptive Grammar (London: Routledge, 1993) by Tej K. Bhatia
- The Phonology and Morphology of Panjabi (New Delhi: Munshiram Manoharlal Publishers, 1995) by Amar N. Malik
- Shackle, Christopher. 2003. Punjabi. In George Cardona & Dhanesh Jain (eds.), The Indo-Aryan languages, 581–621. London: Routledge.
- Bhatia, Tej K. 2006. Punjabi. In Brown & Ogilvie (eds.), 885–889.
- An Introduction to Punjabi: Grammar, Conversation and Literature (Patiala: Punjabi University, 2011) by Gurinder Singh Mann, Gurdit Singh, Ami P. Shah, Gibb Schreffler, and Anne Murphy
- Shah, Safdar Ali (2015). Punjabi Grammar. Islamabad: National University of Sciences and Technology (NUST) Publishing. ISBN 9789698611170.
- Hussain, Qandeel. 2015. Temporal characteristics of Punjabi word-medial singletons and geminates. The Journal of the Acoustical Society of America 138(4), EL388–EL392.
- Panjabi: A Comprehensive Grammar (London: Routledge, 2016) by Mangat Bhardwaj
- Hussain, Qandeel, Michael Proctor, Mark Harvey & Katherine Demuth. 2017. Acoustic characteristics of Punjabi retroflex and dental stops. Journal of the Acoustical Society of America 141(6), 4522–4542.
- A Descriptive Grammar of Hindko, Panjabi, and Saraiki (USA: Mouton de Gruyter, 2019) by Elena Bashir & Thomas J. Conners.

=== In Punjabi ===
- Pañjābī Vyākaraṇasāra. An Elementary Grammar of the Pañjābī Language (in Punjabi) (1st ed. Lodiana: 1867; 2nd ed. Lahore: 1895) by Bihari Lal
- Ram, Pandit Sardha (1884). Panjábí Bát Chít [Panjābī Bāt Chīt] ਪੰਜਾਬੀ ਬਾਤ ਚੀਤ [Punjabi Conversation] (in Punjabi). Ludhiana: Lodiana Mission Press.
- Singh, Ram (1924). Vaḍḍā pañjābī viakaran ਵੱਡਾ ਪੰਜਾਬੀ ਵਿਆਕਰਣ [Large Punjabi Grammar] (in Punjabi). Amritsar.
- Singh, Karam (1929). Navīn panjābī viakaran bhāg 3 ਨਵੀਨ ਪੰਜਾਬੀ ਵਿਆਕਰਣ ਭਾਗ 3 [New Punjabi Grammar Part 3] (in Punjabi). Amritsar.
- Singh, Sahib (1935). Gurbāṇī viākaraṇ ਗੁਰਬਾਣੀ ਵਿਆਕਰਣ [Gurbani Grammar] (in Punjabi). Amritsar.
- Padam, Piara S. (1954). Panjabi boli da itihas. Patiala: Kalam Mandir.
- Bhāshā wigiāna te Pañjābī bhāshā (Delhi: 1973) by Harkirat Singh and Ujjal Singh Bhahri
- Punjabi Diyan Bhashai Veshehtavan [Pañjābī dīāṃ bhāshāī wisheshatāwāṃ] (Patiala: Punjabi University, 1966) by Harkirat Singh
- Rupantari Vyakaran [Rūpāntarī wiākarana] (Textbook Board, Punjab University, 1980) by Harkirat Singh
- Pramāṇika Pañjābī wiākarana (Textbook Board, Punjab University, 1988) by Harkirat Singh
- Gurbani Di Bhasha Te Vyakaran [Gurabāṇī dī bhāshā te wiākarana: Gurabāṇī dā bhāshāī te wiākaranika adhiaina] (Patiala: Publication Bureau, Punjabi University, 1997) by Harkirat Singh
- Pañjābī wiākarana: sakūlāṃ ate kālajāṃ de widiārathīāṃ laī (Textbook Board, Punjab University, 1999) by Harkirat Singh and Giani Lal Singh Giani
- Gurbāṇī dī bʰāśā te viākaraṇ ਗੁਰਬਾਣੀ ਦੀ ਭਾਸ਼ਾ ਤੇ ਵਿਆਕਰਣ [The Language and Grammar of Gurbani] (in Punjabi). Patiala: Punjabi University. 2011.

=== In Russian ===
- Smirnov [Смирнов], Yuri Andreyevich [Юрий Андреевич] (1976). Grammatika yazyka pandzhabi Грамматика языка панджаби [Punjabi Grammar] (in Russian). Moscow, Soviet Union: Nauka, Glavnaya redaktsiya vostochnoy literatury.
- Tolstaya, Nataliya I. (1981). The Panjabi Language: A Descriptive Grammar. Translated by Campbell, George L. London: Routledge & Kegan Paul.
