= Regional language programmes on the BBC Asian Network =

The BBC Asian Network, a BBC National Radio station, had a number of programmes in South Asian languages aimed at a specific community, although since 24 April 2005 under schedule changes as part of a broader review of BBC programming the BBC Asian Network has shifted towards a greater emphasis on English language programming.

== Hindi and Urdu Programming ==
- Gagan Grewal consisting of News, Views, Discussions & Celebrity Interviews presented by Gagan Grewal in Hindi and Urdu - the programme first aired on 15 May 2006 originally under the name Salaam Namaste.
- Hindi-Urdu Programme presented by Sanjay Sharma on Thursday Evenings.

== Punjabi ==
- Punjabi Programme presented by Neelu Kalsi on Friday Evenings.
- Weekend Punjabi Sukhi Bart presents Punjabi Language Programming on from 17:00 - 19:00 on Sunday (previously on Saturday Evenings).

== Gujarati ==
- Gujarati Programme presented by Dev Parmar on Wednesday Evenings from 20:00 - 22:00.
- Weekend Gujarati Dev Parmar presents Gujarati Language Programming on from 21:00 - 23:00 on Sunday (previously on Saturday Evenings).

== Mirpuri ==
- Mirpuri Programme presented by Zarina Khan on Monday Evenings.
- Weekend Mirpuri, Changis Raja presents Mirpuri Language Programming on from 21:00 to 23:00 every Sunday (prior to 17 June the programme had been an hour earlier).

== Bengali ==
- Weekend Bengali, Anwarul Hoque presents Bengali Language Programming from 23:00 on Sunday to 01:00 on Monday mornings (prior to 17 June the programme had been an hour earlier).

== Regional Language Programmes scrapped or to be scrapped ==
From 24 April 2004 the Afternoon programme (primarily in Hindi and Urdu presented from 14:00 to 16:00 on weekdays by Navinder Bhogal was scrapped (she actually finished on it on 8 April 2006).
