= Gebi language =

Gebi may be:

- Gebe language or Minyaifuin, an Austronesian language of eastern Indonesia, spoken on the islands between Halmahera and Waigeo
- Maria language (Papua New Guinea), a Manubaran language spoken in the "bird's tail" of Papua New Guinea

== See also ==
- Ghebi dialect, a dialect of Hindko spoken in Pakistan
