= Chachhi dialect =

Dialect of Hindko

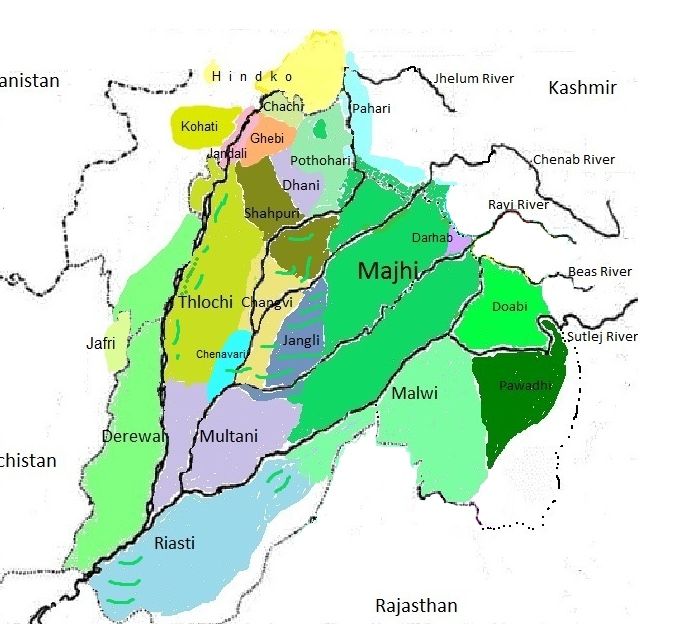
Map of dialects of Punjabi and some closely related languages.

Chhachi, Chacchī, or Chhachhī (چھاچھی) is a dialect of punjabi spoken in the region of Chachh. Grierson classified it within his "North-Western Lahndā" group, whereas Shackle considers it part of Hindko "proper", alongside Ghebī and Avāṅkārī.

== Bibliography ==
- Masica, Colin P. (1991). The Indo-Aryan languages. Cambridge language surveys. Cambridge University Press. ISBN 978-0-521-23420-7.
- Shackle, Christopher (1980). "Hindko in Kohat and Peshawar". Bulletin of the School of Oriental and African Studies. 43 (3): 482–510. doi:10.1017/S0041977X00137401. ISSN 0041-977X.
