= Danda Shah Bilawal =

Village in Punjab, Pakistan

Coordinates: 32°47′N 71°57′E

Danda Shah Bilawal (دندہ شاہ بلاول)
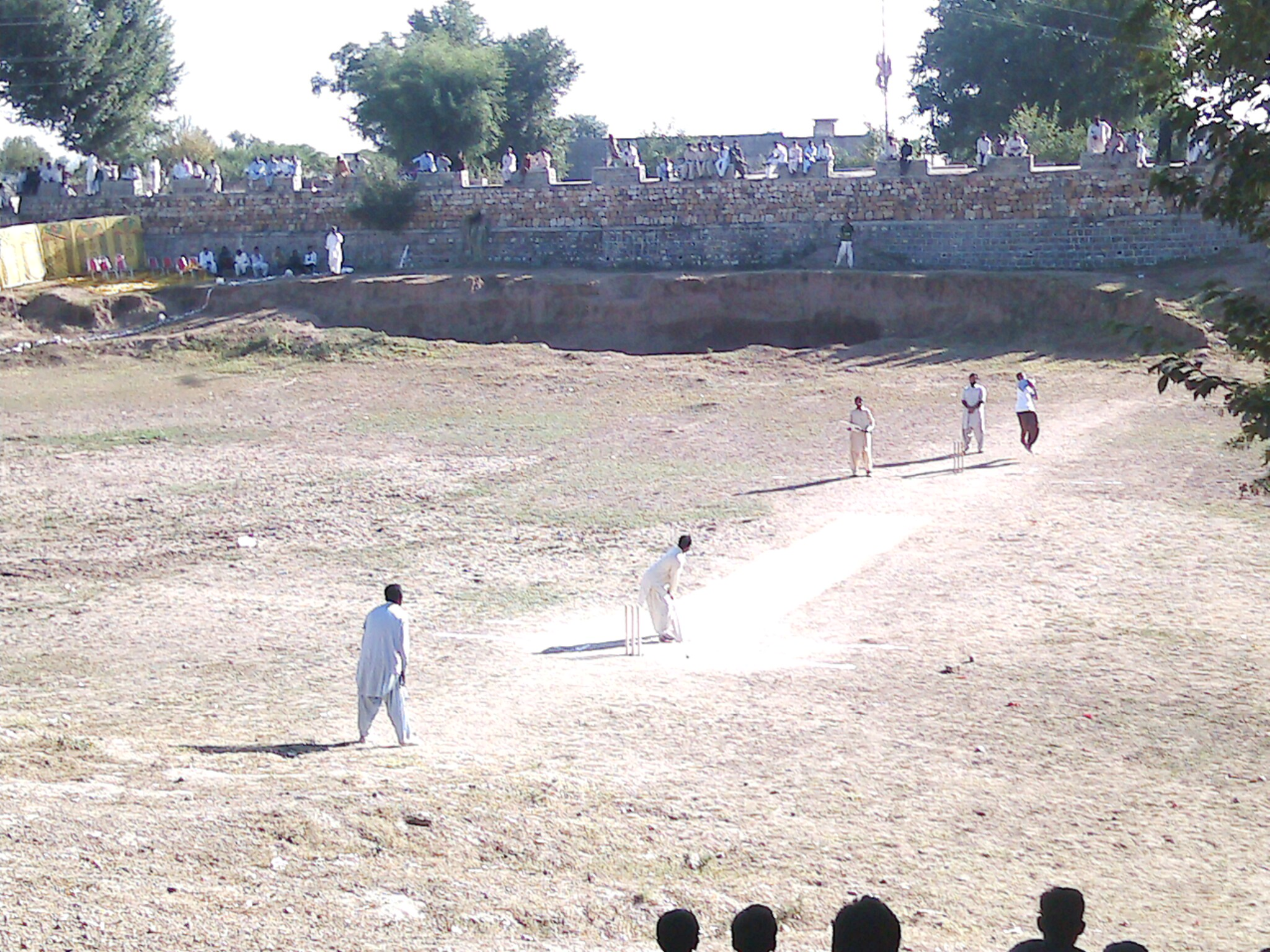
- Bun-Shah Wali
- Country: Pakistan
- Province: Punjab
- District: Talagang

Population
  - Total: 17,000
- Time zone: PST

Danda Shah Bilawal is a village in Punjab, Pakistan located equidistant on the main road linking Mianwali and Talagang. It is a local trade centre for surrounding villages owing to its location.

== Etymology ==
Danda means "/Edge/small hill" while Shah comes from the name of a local saint Syed Ali Ahmed Kabir hamdani. Syed Ali Ahmed visited this village and then stayed here. Bilawal was a blacksmith who was a native of Danda and host of Syed Ali Ahmed. Therefore, the name of the village was later changed from Danda to Danda Shah Bilawal.

== Population ==
Danda Shah Bilawal has a population of around 17,000. Its inhabitants are predominantly Punjabis, with the majority belonging to the Sadat (syed's) and Qutub Shahi Awan's communities.

70% peoples are rich and 20% peoples are middle class and 10% peoples are normal.

The village has strong militarist traditions and many local men have traditionally been soldiers by profession. Around 158 people from Danda Shah Bilawal took part in World War I and II And three were martyred.

Many people fought in the wars of 1965 and 1971, and the number of martyrs and veterans among them is significant.

Captain Malik Ali Khan (Military Cross), elder brother of Risaldar Malik Sher Khan (Pjo209) (Zaman Khel), is the only Military Cross holder in Talagang and second in Chakwal, He belongs to this place.

It is also said that the grave of a forefather of a former president of Pakistan, Asif Ali Zardari, is also there in the old graveyard.

== Infrastructure ==
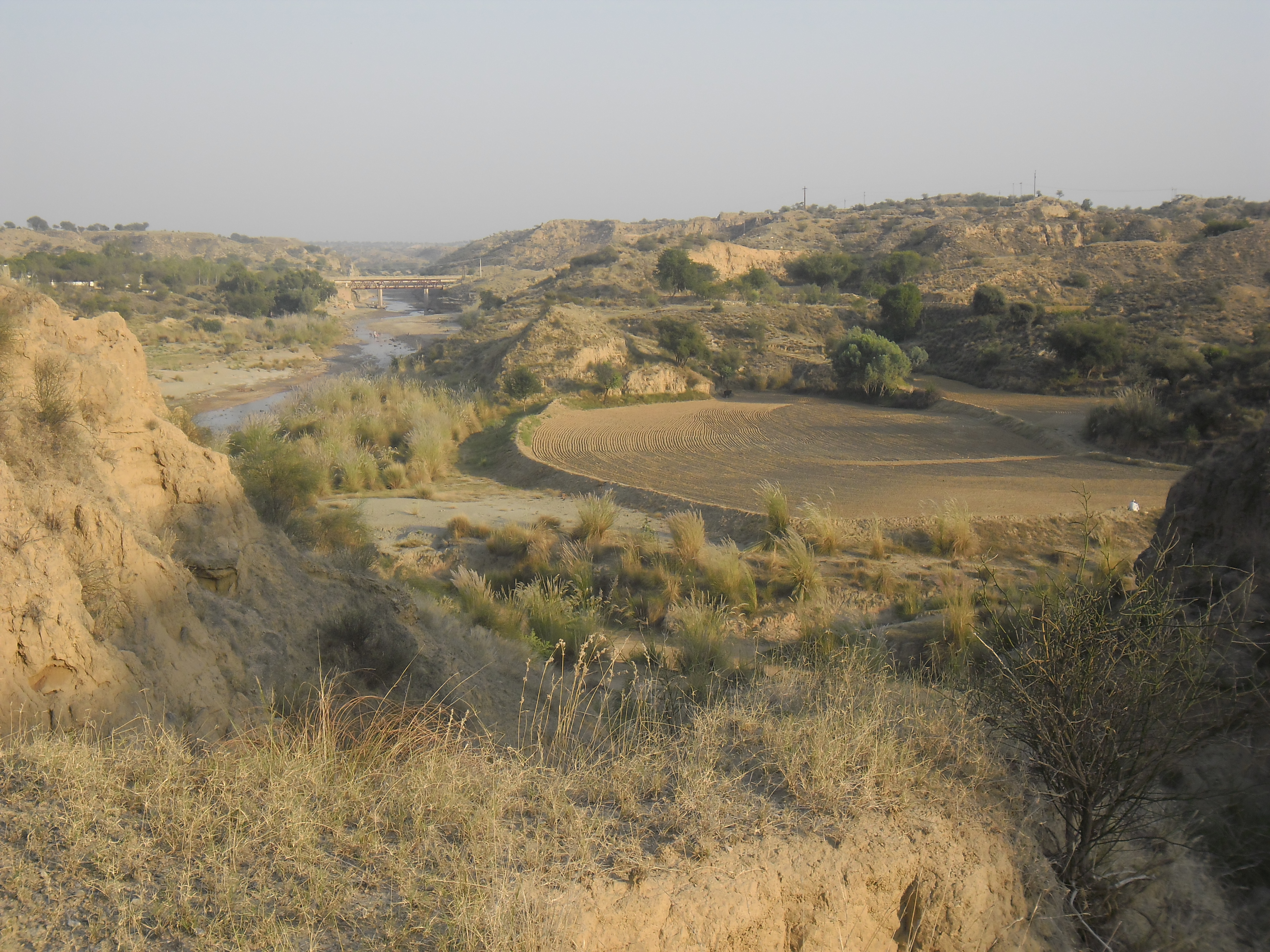
Gambhir Stream

Danda Shah Bilawal has been designated as one of the ten "model villages" in the Chakwal District by the then Chief Minister of Punjab Chaudhry Pervaiz Elahi on personal request of Brigadier R Fateh Khan Malik.With this schemes worth 80 million rupees were completed including two computer centres for Boys and Girls schools a main road running through the village.

The village has eight private schools, fauji foundation school, one girls' high school and a boys' higher secondary school.One special education center ,four Non formal education school,two boys and girls collage, two technical institutes, In 1989, Nawaz Sharif, the then Chief Minister of Punjab, announced the formation of a boys' higher secondary school.

Al Mustafa Trust established its Medical Centre in this village in 2004 providing cheap medical care to poor people of the area. More than 250000 patients have benefited from this facility so far. It includes latest laboratory ECG Ultrasound and two ambulances for transportation of patients. Al Mujtaba Trust is providing scholarships to 60 deserving students in this village.

The village also possesses a cricket stadium, constructed on school lands from funds of model village scheme and is called Chilkoo Stadium.

In 2008 The President of Pakistan Asif Ali Zardari announced the construction of Gambhir Dam, which was to be the largest small/medium dam of Pakistan. In the five-year reign of the Pakistan Peoples Party, no work was done on this project. Now the recent government decided to start the project and an amount of Rs. 1974.350 million has been approved for the construction of Gambhir Dam in constituency PP-23 as per dams division letter on 24 November 2015.

== Political preferences ==
In 2013 general elections. Pakistan Muslim League (N) were victorious over Pakistan Tehreek-e-Insaf and Pakistan Muslim League (Q). In 2015 local elections, Pakistan Tehreek-e-Insaf won over Pakistan Muslim League (N) by winning from all the five electoral wards of Danda Shah Bilawal.
