= Awankari dialect =

Lahnda Dialect spoken in Punjab, Pakistan

Awankari
- Native to: Pakistan
- Region: Punjab
- Language family: Indo-European: Indo-Iranian; Indo-Aryan; Northwestern; Lahnda; Hindko; Awankari

Language codes
- ISO 639-3: –
- Glottolog: avan1234
- Location within Pakistan
- Coordinates: 32.91°N 72.17°E

Awankari (Avāṅkārī, Awankari pronunciation: [əʋaːɳkaːɾi]) is a Lahnda dialect spoken primarily in Talagang District, in the north-west of the Pakistani province of Punjab.

Awankari, classified by Shackle (1980, p. 485–486) as Hindko, is viewed by its native speakers as (a dialect of) Punjabi. The rest of this article is based entirely on Hardev Bahri's work of the 1930s. It is possible that the geographic extent, the division into sub-dialects, and the linguistic characteristics might have changed since then.

== Geographic extent ==
Awankari is spoken primarily in the Awankari tract, which occupies the western half of Chakwal District in northwestern Punjab. To the north, the Sohan River separates it from the Ghebi dialect, although Awankari extends beyond the river in Tarap and Injra. The eastern boundary roughly coincides with the East Gabhir stream (beyond which is found the Dhanochi dialect), while the Salt Range forms the fuzzy southern border with Shahpuri. To the west, the West Gabhir stream separates it from Thali, with Awankari also spoken beyond the river in Danda Shah Bilawal and Lawa.

== Dialects ==
Hardev Bahri, who did linguistic work on Awankari in the 1930s, identifies three subdialects. Waṇāḍhī is spoken in the eastern half of Awankari's territory, in the plains of the Wanadh region centred on the town of Talagang. The Ankar stream separates it from the two western dialects: Reshī in the north-west (named after the stream of Resh), and Pākhṛī in the southwest, the two divided by a series of groves locally known as Rakhs.

Bahri also noted the differences of vocabulary between the speech forms of Muslims and Hindus. For example, "Thursday" is /zʊmerɑt/ among Muslims and /ʋirʋar/ among Hindus, "to bathe" is /ɖʱɑʋʊɳ/ among Muslims and /nɦɔɳ/ among Hindus; Muslims have /kʌttʰe/ for "where?" and Hindus have /kɪttʰe/. A further difference was that the retroflex lateral /ɭ/ (see below) was generally only kept distinctive in the speech of Muslims, with Hindus pronouncing it the same way as the "normal" alveolar lateral /l/.

== Phonology ==
This section follows Bahri's description of Awankari as spoken at the end of the 1930s.

=== Vowels ===
Vowels
	Front		Central		Back
Close	i				u
		ɪ		ʊ
	e				o
Mid			ʌ
	ɛ				ɔ
Open				ɑ

The following words illustrate the contrasts between the vowels: /mɪl/ 'meet', /mil/ 'mile', /mʊl/ 'price', /mul/ 'principal (sum)', /mel/ 'marriage, guests', /mɛl/ 'dirt', /mʌl/ 'rub', /mɑl/ 'cattle', /polɑ/ 'soft', /pɔlɑ/ 'shoe'. Some speakers pronounce /ɔ/ as a diphthong. The three vowels /ɪ/, /ʊ/ and /ʌ/ are short.

Nasal vowels are relatively rare, but contrastive: /lu/ 'a type of hot wind' contrasts with /lũ/ 'hair', and /kʰɪɖɑ/ 'make one play' – with /kʰɪ̃ɖɑ/ 'scatter'. Non-phonemic nasalisation occurs under the influence of adjacent nasal consonants. A vowel will get nasalised before a nasal consonants unless this consonant is in a different, unstressed, syllable (for instance, there is nasalisation in /kʰɑ̃ɳ/ 'mine', but not in /bɪ.mɑr/ 'ill'). A vowel is also nasalised after a nasal consonant provided the vowel is unstressed and at the end of a word of more than one syllable (/sonɑ̃/ 'gold').

=== Stress and tones ===
The position of stress is usually predictable. In words of three or more syllables, there is a prominent stress on the second syllable from the end. In words of two syllables, stress will depend on the relative length of the vowels: if the vowels in the two syllables are both long or both short, then both syllables get equal stress; if the first vowel is long and the second short, then there is a slight stress on the first syllable; if the first syllable is short and the second one long, then there is a prominent stress on the second syllable. There are exceptions; for example in compound words, the position of stress depends on the type of compound involved. Stress is particularly prominent in the southwestern Pakhri subdialect, where it is accompanied by a jerk of the head and a rise of the larynx. It is so prominent that speakers of other dialects have described Pakhri as a "loud and vigorous language" whose speakers "throw stones of sounds".

Unlike most other Indo-Aryan languages, Awankari possesses a system of contrastive tone, which is however simpler than that of Punjabi. Hardev Bahri has described the following tones: 1) the level tone characteristic of most syllables, 2) a tone realised as falling in the Wanadhi dialect and as high in Reshi, 3) a low rising tone found in only about a dozen words. Tone is contrastive: /mɑ̂l/ (falling tone) 'rope' vs. /mɑl/ (level tone) 'property'; /bʱɑ̂/ (falling tone) 'fire' vs. /bʱɑ/ (level tone) 'rate', /kʰô/ (falling tone) 'to snatch' vs. /kʰo/ (level tone) 'bad habit', and /ʌnɑ̀rɑ/ 'darkness' (low rising tone) vs. /ʌnɑrɑ/ 'a personal name' (level tone). Each word can have only one contrastive tone. In the analysis of Kalicharan Bahl, the rare low rising tone is treated as a non-phonemic effect that accompanies medial /ɦ/. Awankari is then regarded as having two tones: a level tone and a falling tone (or rising tone, depending on the dialect).

=== Consonants ===
Consonants
	Labial	Dental/ Alveolar	Retroflex	Palatal	Velar	Glottal
Plosive	p pʰ b bʱ	t tʰ d dʱ	ʈ ʈʰ ɖ ɖʱ	c cʰ ɟ ɟʱ	k kʰ ɡ ɡʱ	
Fricative	f	s z		ɕ	x (ɣ)	ɦ
Nasal	m	n	ɳ	(ɲ)	(ŋ)	
Rhotic		r	ɽ			
Lateral		l	(ɭ)			
Approximant	ʋ			j		

The plosive consonants of Awankari come with four phonation types: voiceless (/p/)^{egy}, aspirated (/pʰ/)^{kettő}, voiced (/b/)^{három}, and voiced aspirated (/bʱ/)^{négy}. In the western dialects there is a tendency for the loss of aspiration (in both voiced and voiceless plosives) in certain contexts : compare Wanadhi /ɡʊtthi/ with Reshi /ɡʊtti/ 'pocket'.

The phonemes /c/, /cʰ/, /ɟ/ and /ɟʱ/ are plosives (not affricates) articulated with the front of the tongue touching the palate, with the tongue's blade against the alveolars. The aspirated /cʰ/ is more front than /c/. The plosives /t/, /tʰ/, /d/, and /dʱ/ are dental, while /n/ and /l/ are alveolar.

Among the fricatives, /f/, /z/, /x/ and /ɣ/ are less common: they are found in about a hundred words each. The uvular fricatives /x/ (as in /nɪxtɑ/ 'came out') and /ɣ/ (/roɣʊn/ 'paint') are articulated further back in the throat than the velar plosives, but not as far back as in Persian; /ɣ/ is not always distinguished from /ɡ/. The palatal /ɕ/ (as in /ɕɪkɑru/ 'hunter') is articulated against the hard palate, with the tongue blade touching the upper teeth and tongue tip reaching the lower teeth.

Of the nasals, only the bilabial /m/ and the alveolar /n/ occur in all positions. The retroflex /ɳ/ occurs in the middle or at the end of words: /kɑɳɑ/ 'one-eyed', /bʱɛɳ/ 'sister'). The palatal (ɲ) and velar (ŋ) nasals are usually found only before the corresponding plosive (/ɖɪŋɡɑ/ 'curved', /ɪɲɟe/ 'for nothing'). Exceptions are found in the Reshi sub-dialect, which for example has /ʋʌŋŋã/ 'bangles', where the Wanadhi dialect has /ʋʌŋɡã/).

The retroflex lateral /ɭ/ (as in /mɑɭi/ 'gardener'), a sound described by Bahri as "important and peculiar" to Awankari, is of uncertain phonemic status. It is not found at the start of a word. Its articulation is accompanied by a widening of the pharynx and raising of the epiglottis. Hardev Bahri observed in the 1930s that it was generally not pronounced by the Hindus, especially in the big villages, who substituted it with the alveolar /l/. For those speakers who do pronounce it, it can occur in the middle and at the end of words, in contrast to the alveolar /l/ which is found only word-initially.

The retroflex /ɽ/ (/kuɽ/ 'lie') is a flap consonant and it only occurs in the middle or at the end of the word. The alveolar /r/ (as in /dur/ 'distant') is a trill (a "rolled r"). In its articulation the tongue normally makes two contacts, but the number varies depending on the context: it is greater in a stressed position or before a high-falling tone, a long vowel, or /l/. It is smaller if followed by either a plosive, or the sibilants /s/ and /ɕ/, or if occurring in a syllable that precedes the stressed syllable.

== Bibliography ==
- Bahl, Kalicharan (1957). "A Note on Tones in Western Punjabi (Lahanda)". Indian Linguistics. 18: 30–34.
- Bahri, Hardev (1962). Lahndi Phonology: With Special Reference to Awánḳárí. Allahabad: Bharati Press.
- Bahri, Hardev (1963). Lahndi Phonetics: With Special Reference to Awáṇkárí. Allahabad: Bharati Press.
- Rensch, Calvin R. (1992). "The Language Environment of Hindko-Speaking People". In O'Leary, Clare F.; Rensch, Calvin R.; Hallberg, Calinda E. (eds.). Hindko and Gujari. Sociolinguistic Survey of Northern Pakistan. Islamabad: National Institute of Pakistan Studies, Quaid-i-Azam University and Summer Institute of Linguistics. ISBN 969-8023-13-5.
- Shackle, Christopher (1980). "Hindko in Kohat and Peshawar". Bulletin of the School of Oriental and African Studies. 43 (3): 482–510. doi:10.1017/S0041977X00137401. ISSN 0041-977X. S2CID 129436200.
