= Hardev Bahri =

Indian linguist

Hardev Bahri (also Bahari; 1 January 1907 – 31 March 2000) was an Indian linguist, literary critic, and lexicographer, notable for his work in Hindi, Punjabi, and other related Indo-Aryan languages. He compiled numerous monolingual and bilingual dictionaries for both general and technical purposes in collaboration with the Delhi-based publisher Rajpal and Sons.

== Life ==
Bahri was born on 1 January 1907 in Talagang, then a Tehsil of district Campbell Pur Attock, part of the British Raj, now an independent district in Punjab, Pakistan.

He obtained his Ph.D. from Panjab University. Likely due to the Partition of India, he migrated to Allahabad, Uttar Pradesh and became a professor in the Department of Hindi at the University of Allahabad, where in 1959 he also earned his Doctor of Letters for his seminal work Hindi Semantics. He occupied that post for over two decades, pursuing academic research in both theoretical and applied linguistics as well as literary criticism.

He died on 31 March 2000.

== Works ==
- Hardev Bahri (1947). Hindī kī Kavya Śailiyoñ kā Vikās [Development of Poetic Style of Hindi] (in Hindi).
- — (1952). Prākŕt aur Uskā Sāhitya [Prakrit and its Literature] (in Hindi).
- — (1955). Hindī Sāhitya kī Rūprekhā [Outline of Hindi Literature] (in Hindi).
- — (1957). Prasād Sāhitya Koś [Collection of Prasad's Literature] (in Hindi).
- — (1958). Prasād Kavya Vivecan [Investigation of Prasad's Poetry] (in Hindi).
- — (1958). Śabda Siddhi [Word Perfection] (in Hindi).
- — (1959). Hindi Semantics (Thesis). Allahabad: Bharati Press Publications.
- — (1960). Persian influence on Hindi. Bharati Press Publications.
- — (1962). Lahndi Phonology (With special reference to Awáṇkárí). Allahabad.
- — (1965). Hindī: Udbhav, Vikās, aur Rūp [Hindi: Origin, Development, and Form]. Allahabad: Kitāb Mahal.
- — (1966). Hindī Grāmīṇ Boliyā [Rural Dialects of Hindi]. Allahabad: Kitāb Mahal.
- — (1969). Br̥hat Aṅgrezī-Hindī Koś [Comprehensive English-Hindi Dictionary].
- — (1981). Bhojpurī Śabd-sampadā.
- — (1982). Avadhī Śabd-sampadā.
- — (1989). Śikṣārthī Hindī-Aṅgrezī Śabdkoś [Learners' Hindi-English Dictionary]. Delhi: Rajpal & Sons. Archived from the original on 15 August 2019.
- — (2011). Teach yourself Panjabi. Patiala: Punjabi University.
