= Ghebi =

Dialect of Hindko

Ghebī (Hindko:گھیبی) is a dialect of Hindko, spoken in the north-west of the Pakistani province of Punjab. In the early 20th century Grierson assigned it to his "North-Western Lahnda" group, whereas Shackle writing in 1980 placed it within Hindko "proper" alongside Chacchī and Avāṅkārī.

Ghebi is mainly spoken in Pindi Gheb and Fateh Jang Tehsils of Attock District and adjacent areas within Mianwali District and Chakwal District.

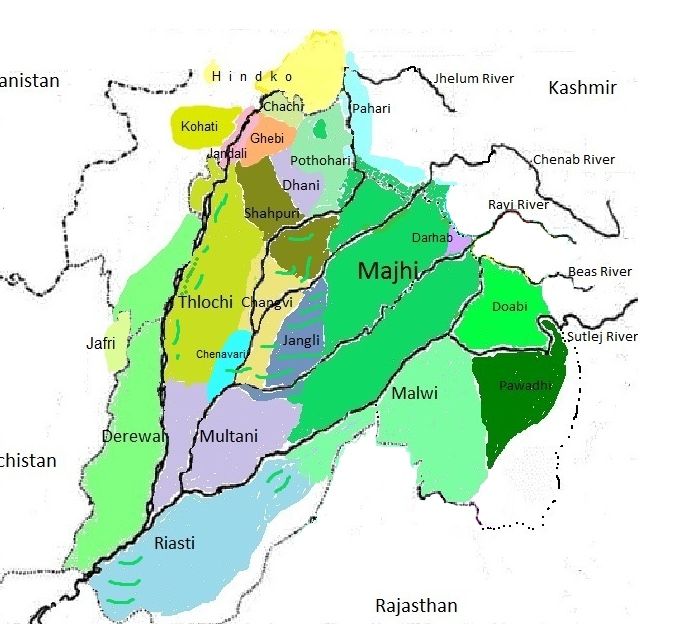
Map of Punjabi dialects, including Ghebi in the north-west

== Bibliography ==
- Shackle, Christopher (1980). "Hindko in Kohat and Peshawar". Bulletin of the School of Oriental and African Studies. 43 (3): 482–510. doi:10.1017/S0041977X00137401. ISSN 0041-977X.
