= Indians in Afghanistan =

Overview of the presence of Indian nationals and citizens in Afghanistan

هندی‌ها در افغانستان په افغانستان کې هندي

Total population
- 3,000

Regions with significant populations
- Kabul · Jalalabad

Languages
- Hindi · English · Punjabi · Pashto · Persian (Dari) · Urdu · other Indian languages

Religion
- Hinduism · Sikhism · Islam

Related ethnic groups
- Indian diaspora, Hindkowans, Rajputs, Jats, Gujjars, Awans and other Indo-Aryan peoples

There used to be a small community of Indians in Afghanistan who are Afghans of Indian origin as well as Indian construction and aid workers involved in rebuilding and humanitarian assistance efforts. India is often described as acting as a soft power in Afghanistan. Having committed a $2.3 billion aid programme, India is one of the largest donors to Afghanistan, investing in the economy, humanitarian aid, education, development, construction and electrical. According to Foreign Policy among Afghans there is a positive perception of India's role in the reconstruction efforts in Afghanistan.

All Indians in Afghanistan have either returned or were evacuated during Operation Devi Shakti, after the 2021 Taliban offensive and the subsequent Fall of Kabul. Indians in Afghanistan

== History ==
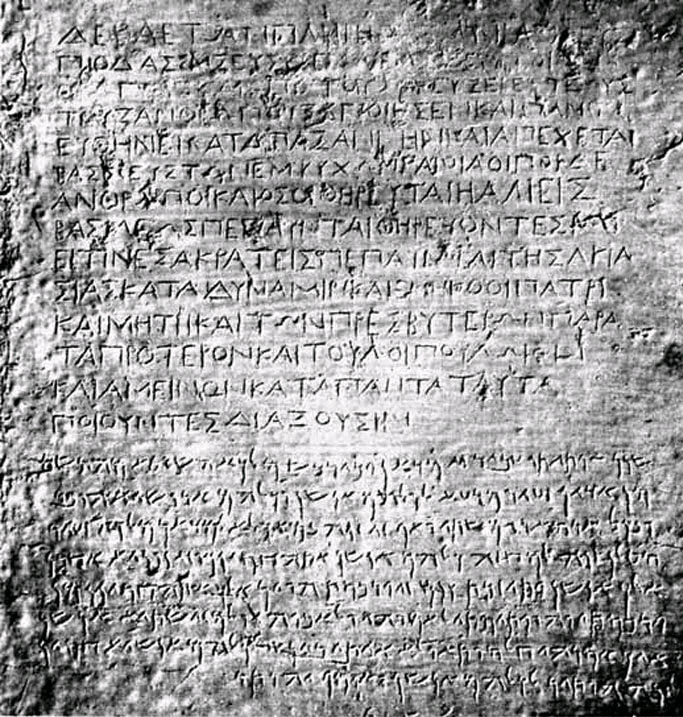
An edict of Ashoka from Kandahar, now in the Kabul museum.

Afghanistan and the Indian subcontinent were historically and ethnically linked in earlier times. An edict of the Mauryan emperor Ashoka has been found in Kandahar, marking the western extent of his dominion. The mahajanapada of Gandhara extended from the Kabul river to the Punjab, comprising Hindu and Buddhist dynasties, and lasted a thousand years till the 11th Century AD when it was overthrown by the Ghaznavids. Trade ties with Afghanistan go back hundreds of years with trade blooming during the reign of the Mughal emperors in India with their fondness for fruit and other produce from Central Asia.

Migration of Hindu community to Afghanistan was mainly from the neighbouring kingdom of Punjab, later a province of British India. By the nineteenth century a large Hindu community, comprising ethnic groups such as Lohanis and Shikarpuri Khatris, was widespread throughout the region and tribes and concerned primarily with commerce. A city peopled by Khatri Hindus, Shikarpur, was established in the 1800s and rose to be one of Afghanistan's main centres of commerce – primarily a money market and banking centre, which had outlying partnerships with places as widely apart as "Bombay, Punjab, Sindh, Khorasan, parts of Persia and Russia". They eventually developed control of the banking throughout Central Asia ranging from "Astrakhan to Meshid to Calcutta" (vide Alexander Burnes). Known by the local epithet of Hindkis, they spoke a variant of Punjabi, gained employment in financial and clerical posts throughout the region, were shopkeepers, grain merchants, money-lenders and goldsmiths, forming a vital part of the economy of the region. Shah Shuja employed as his finance minister, Lalla Jeth Mall, a Khatri Hindu from Shikarpur. Barnes records that the population of Hindkis in Afghanistan at that time to be about 300,000.

The Khilafat movement of 1920 saw a spontaneous migration of Indian Muslims to be free of perceived British bondage of Islam by emigrating to neighbouring Afghanistan. Encouraged by their religious leaders, thousands of peoples sold their belongings and migrated to Afghanistan choking the Khyber Pass with their possessions on bullock cart, camel and cycles. Overwhelmed by the migration, the Amir of Afghanistan blocked the emigration. Large numbers of muhajirin were robbed by Afghan tribes, and died of heat, thirst and hunger. Thousands returned home destitute.

As of 1990, the population of Afghans of Indian origin was estimated at 45,000, mostly descended from migrants from the Punjab region. They settled down in various parts of Afghanistan, particularly Jalalabad and Kabul. Many left Afghanistan after the Taliban came to power in 1996, mainly due to harsh restrictions imposed on them, leaving a population of approximately 1,000, mainly based in Kabul and Jalalabad. India did not have any official representation in Afghanistan while the Taliban were in power. The small Hindu and Sikh communities suffered harsh discrimination during that period. In April 2001, the Taliban issued an edict requiring Hindu males to wear marks of red dots (tilak) on their forehead, were barred from wearing salwar kameez or white turban and forced to wear black caps as identification when leaving their homes. Hindu women were forced to drape themselves in yellow dress and wear iron necklace. Hindus also were ordered to display a yellow flag on their houses and were not allowed to reside in the same houses as Muslims.

== Indian aid to Afghanistan ==
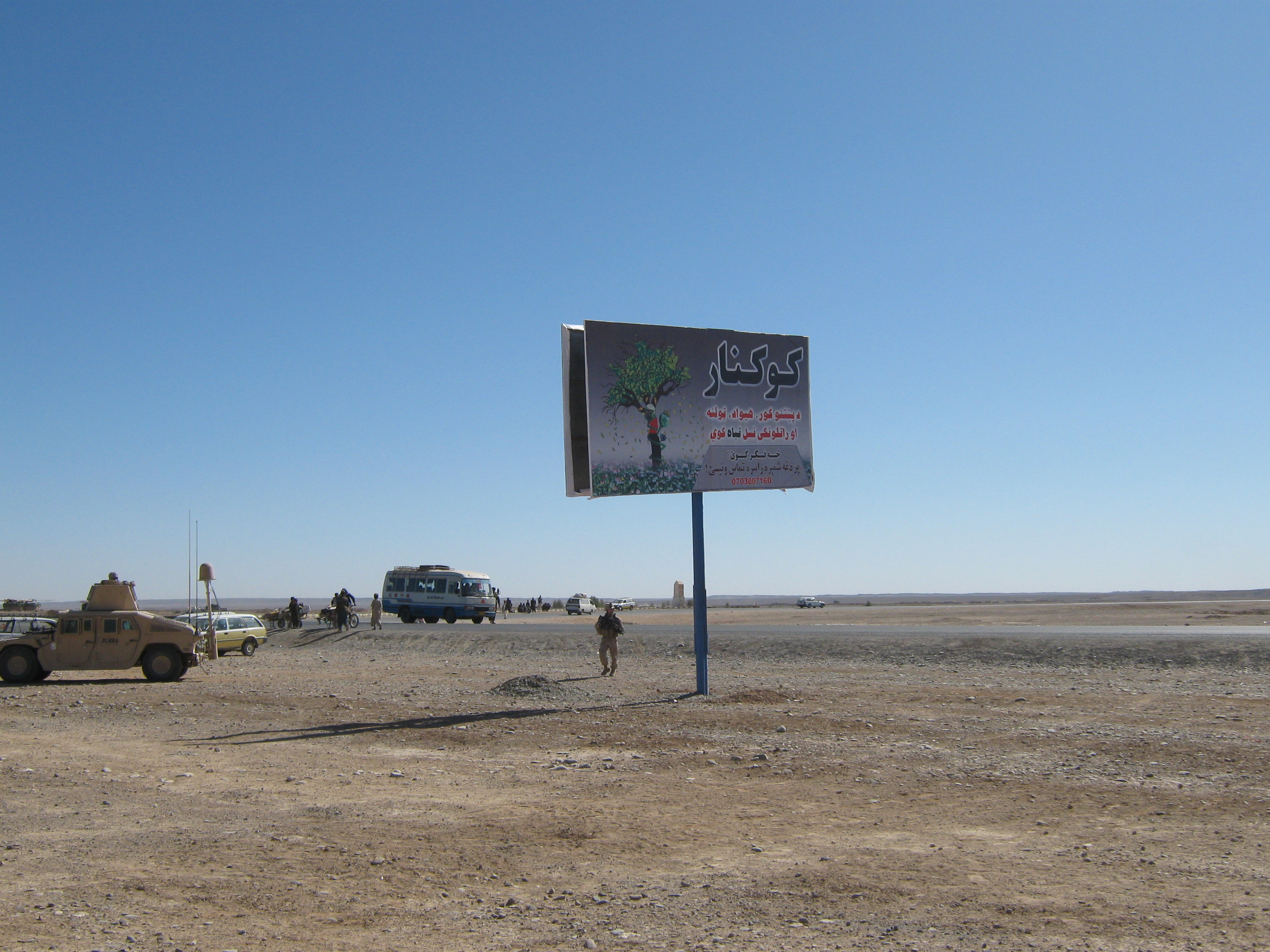
Intersection of A01 and Delaram-Zaranj Highway near Delaram

India has no military presence in Afghanistan. An estimated 3,000 Indian nationals in Afghanistan worked for reconstruction companies, international aid agencies or diplomats working at the consulates and embassies.

As part of its humanitarian mission, India established field clinics and a children's hospital. It also ran a programme providing midday-meals to about 2 million Afghan school children.

In the construction sector, an important work constructed by Indians is the 217 kilometre Delaram–Zaranj Highway, or Route 606 by Indian construction agencies in Southern Afghanistan, the completion of which in August 2009 has given a viable alternative route for duty-free movement of goods through the Chahabar port in Iran to Afghanistan. Road building has been a prominent component of India reconstruction aid – over 700 kilometres of roads have been built in the preceding eight years. The hallmark project of the Indian aid effort is a majestic domed edifice costing $125 million for the Afghan Parliament which is likely to be completed at the end of 2011.

The government of India also provided assistance in strengthening institutions and human resource development. Scholarships were provided in 2009 for 700 Afghan citizens while Afghan public servants were granted access to government training institutions in India for periods ranging from days to six months.

According to Foreign Policy, which analysed perceptions about India especially among Pashtuns from Kabul to Kandahar, "the widespread support in the Pashtun heartland for an even greater Indian role in rebuilding the Afghan economy and society" is "striking". In 2011 India and Afghanistan signed the Strategic Partnership Agreement which would allow India to train and equip Afghan security forces.

== Attacks on Indians ==
Since 2008, Indian civilians and diplomatic buildings have been a target of numerous deadly terrorist attacks. Most of these attacks are carried out by Pakistan based-terrorist groups.

In 2008, an attack on the Indian Embassy in Afghanistan killed 58 people and wounded 141. The attacks killed an Indian defense attaché, a political consul, two embassy security guards, six Afghan police officers and many Afghan civilians.

International officials believe, Pakistan's Inter-Services Intelligence masterminded the attacks while the Lashkar-e-Taiba in collaboration with the Haqqani network carried out the attacks. Afghan President Hamid Karzai terming the attacks an "abominable act" by "the enemies of Afghanistan's friendship with India" said the Indian Embassy bombing in Kabul was the work of "Pakistani agents". He also stated, "India has made a significant contribution to development and reconstruction efforts in Afghanistan. Resorting to these types of hellish acts will not damage the friendly relationship between Afghanistan and India." United States President George W. Bush confronted Pakistani Prime Minister Yousuf Raza Gilani with evidence and warned him that in the case of another such attack he would have to take "serious action". Pakistan denied any involvement in the attacks. Pakistani foreign ministry spokesman Mohammed Sadiq said there was not enough evidence of ISI involvement.

In 2009, a second attack on the Indian embassy killed 17 people. The Haqqani network was blamed for the attack. In 2011, Mike Mullen, Chairman of the U.S. Joint Chiefs of Staff, stated the Haqqani network was in many ways "a strategic arm of Pakistan's Inter-Services Intelligence Agency".

In 2010, six Indian construction workers and several Indian doctors were killed in terrorist attacks on two Kabul guesthouses often frequented by Indians. Saeed Ansari, the spokesman for Afghanistan's National Directorate of Security, said the militants who attacked the Indian guesthouse were speaking Urdu, Pakistan's official language. "We are very close to the exact proof and evidence that the attack on the Indian guesthouse ... was carried out by Lashkar-e-Taiba network, who are dependent on the Pakistan military."

In 2019, 4 Indian nationals were kidnapped by Haqqani network. However, they were rescued in a special exfiltration operation undertaken by R&AW.

== See also ==
- Afghanistan-India relations
- Afghans in India
- Hinduism in Afghanistan
- Pakistanis in Afghanistan
- Sikhism in Afghanistan
- Punjabis in Afghanistan
