= Punjabis in Afghanistan =

Afġānistān vic Panjābī

Total population
- 3,000 This number excludes those who now identify as Pashtuns and members of other ethnic groups.

Regions with significant populations
- Kabul and other regions

Languages
- Pashto · Dari · Punjabi

Religion
- Sikhism · Hinduism · Islam

Related ethnic groups
- Punjabi diaspora

Punjabis in Afghanistan were residents of Afghanistan who were of Punjabi ancestry. There was historically a small Punjabi community in the country, mainly consisting of Afghan Sikhs and Hindus.

== History ==
Punjab lies to the east of the Pashtun region and has shared borders with Afghanistan at various points in history. For several centuries, dynasties centered in modern Afghanistan expanded towards Punjab, such as the Kushans, Kidarites, Hephthalites, Ghaznavids, Ghurids, Khaljis and Durranis. Other kingdoms common to both regions include the Indo-Scythians, Indo-Parthians and Kabul Shahis. In his 1857 review of J.W. Kaye's The Afghan War, Friedrich Engels describes Afghanistan as "an extensive country of Asia" which "formerly included... a considerable part of the Punjab." In the 19th century, the Sikh Empire originating in Punjab made a series of incursions towards the Afghan frontiers, capturing large swathes of territory to the Khyber Pass.

Afghan Sikh history is considered to stretch back 200 to 500 years. Not all Sikhs are of Punjabi origin however; a small minority include locals whose ancestors adopted Sikhism during Guru Nanak's 15th century expeditions to Kabul. In the 18th century, Hindu Khatri merchants from Punjab settled in Afghanistan and dominated regional trade. The Sikh and Hindu population in Afghanistan may have numbered as much as 250,000 in the 1940s. Both communities were particularly well-represented in business and government positions. The reign of Zahir Shah was considered prosperous. Some of them were wealthy landowners. In 1947, some Sikhs from Potohar in northern Punjab arrived in Afghanistan while fleeing violence during the partition of India.

== Demographics ==
The population of Punjabi Sikhs and Hindus in Afghanistan stood up to 100,000 prior to the 1990s. The Soviet invasion in 1979 and the ensuing Afghan civil wars sparked a mass exodus and the community declined drastically. Most migrated to Pakistan or India, while others resettled in North America and Europe. The population in 2014 was around 3,000. The majority lived in Kabul. During the Taliban regime, Sikhs and Hindus were forced to wear yellow armbands for identification as well as hang yellow flags over their homes. Some discrimination still persists as they are often barred from government jobs, viewed as immigrants or threatened for ransom because they are considered rich.

== Culture ==
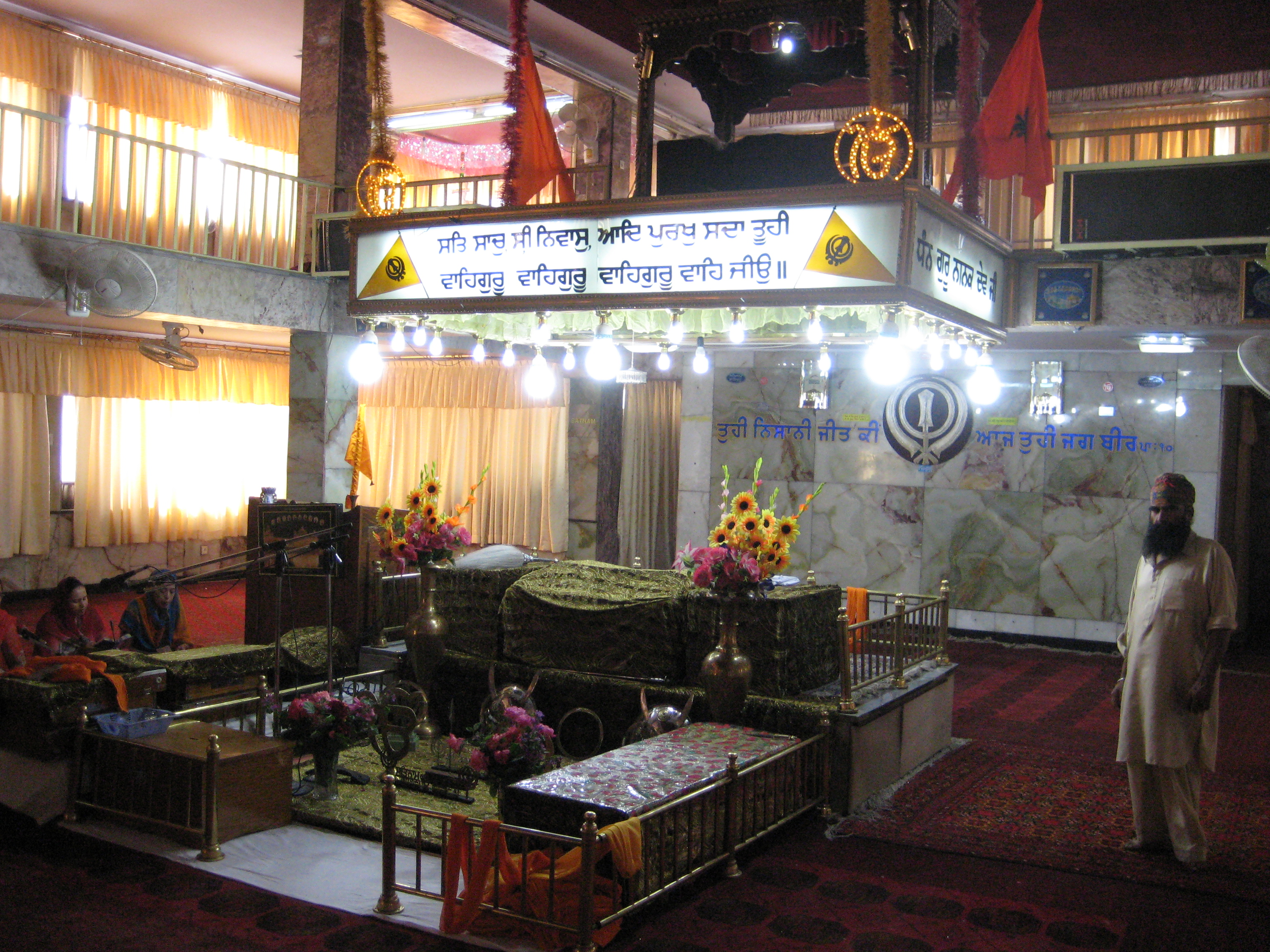
Interior of Gurdwara Karte Parwan in Kabul

Some of the Afghan Sikhs and Hindus adopted Afghan customs may have assimilated into the local culture, speaking Dari and Pashto. However, Punjabi is still spoken by most at home. There have been efforts to teach Punjabi to the younger generation, as it is also the language of Sikh religious texts. The Afghan government opened two Punjabi schools in Kabul and Jalalabad, facilitating the Sikh community.

== Notable people ==
- Anarkali Kaur Honaryar, Afghan politician and women right's activist
- Awtar Singh, Afghan politician

== See also ==
- Punjabi diaspora
- Sikhism in Afghanistan
- Hinduism in Afghanistan
- Indians in Afghanistan
- Pakistanis in Afghanistan
