= Qalacha =

Qalacha قلاچه
- Neighborhood of Kabul
- Country: Afghanistan
- Province: Kabul

Qalacha (Dari: قلاچه), is a neighborhood in District 8 of southeastern Kabul, Afghanistan.

The area was home to a cremation ground used by Afghan Hindus and Afghan Sikhs since the 1890s, but has since become a controversy as local Muslims object to cremations on the site.

Qalacha is a rather poor area with an inadequate quality water supply as of 2019.
