= Kārte Parwān =

- Neighborhood
- Country: Afghanistan
- Province: Kabul

Kārte Parwān is a neighborhood in north-western Kabul, Afghanistan, and home to the Sikh Gurdwara Karte Parwan, Sheerno Junior High, Hotel Inter-Continental Kabul and the Bagh-e Bala Palace. The area used to be the center of the Afghan Hindu and Afghan Sikh communities before the Soviet invasion of Afghanistan. It is located 3 to 5 km away from downtown Kabul, and the Salang Watt road passes through part of it. The area is noted for having several high-profile mansions. Most of its residents are ethnic Tajiks.

The Pakistan embassy in Kabul is also located in this neighborhood.

== Notable people ==
- Abdullah Abdullah, the former Chief Executive and Minister of Foreign Affairs of Afghanistan, is said to have been born in a house in this neighborhood and still resides in the same house.
- al-Qaeda militants, Saif al-Adel and Abu Faraj al-Libbi, and associated members of the Khadr family are reported to have lived in the area in and around the year 2000.
