= Sikhism in Afghanistan =

Afghan Sikhs ਅਫ਼ਗ਼ਾਨਿਸਤਾਨ ਵਿੱਚ ਸਿੱਖ ਧਰਮ په افغانستان کې سکهزم
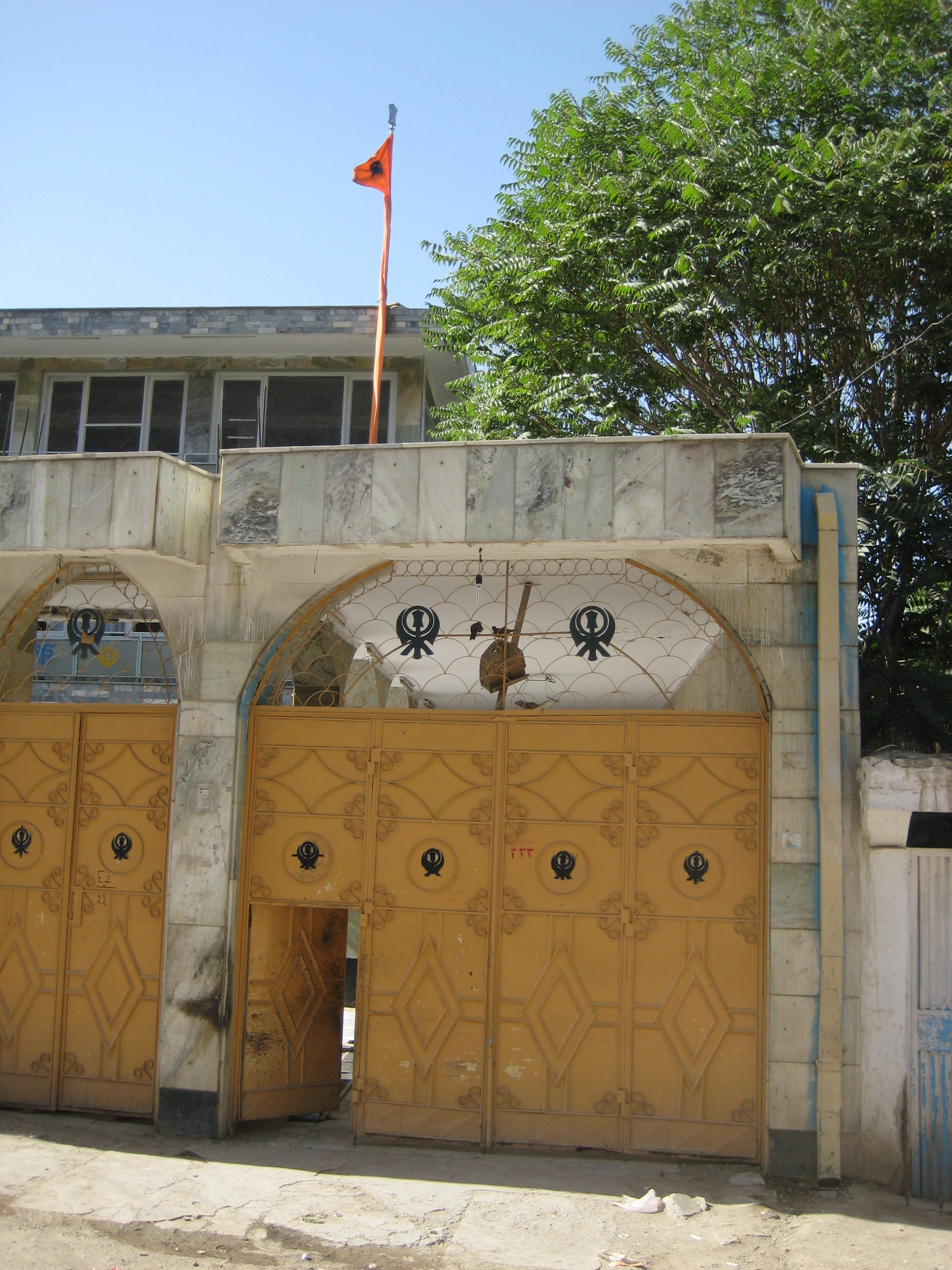
- Gurdwara Karte Parwan in Kabul, Afghanistan

Total population
- 43 (2025)

Regions with significant populations
- India: 9,194-75,000
- United Kingdom: >10,000
- Russia: 2,000
- Afghanistan: 43

Religions
- Sikhism

Languages
- Pashto • Dari • Hindko; Punjabi • Hindi • Urdu

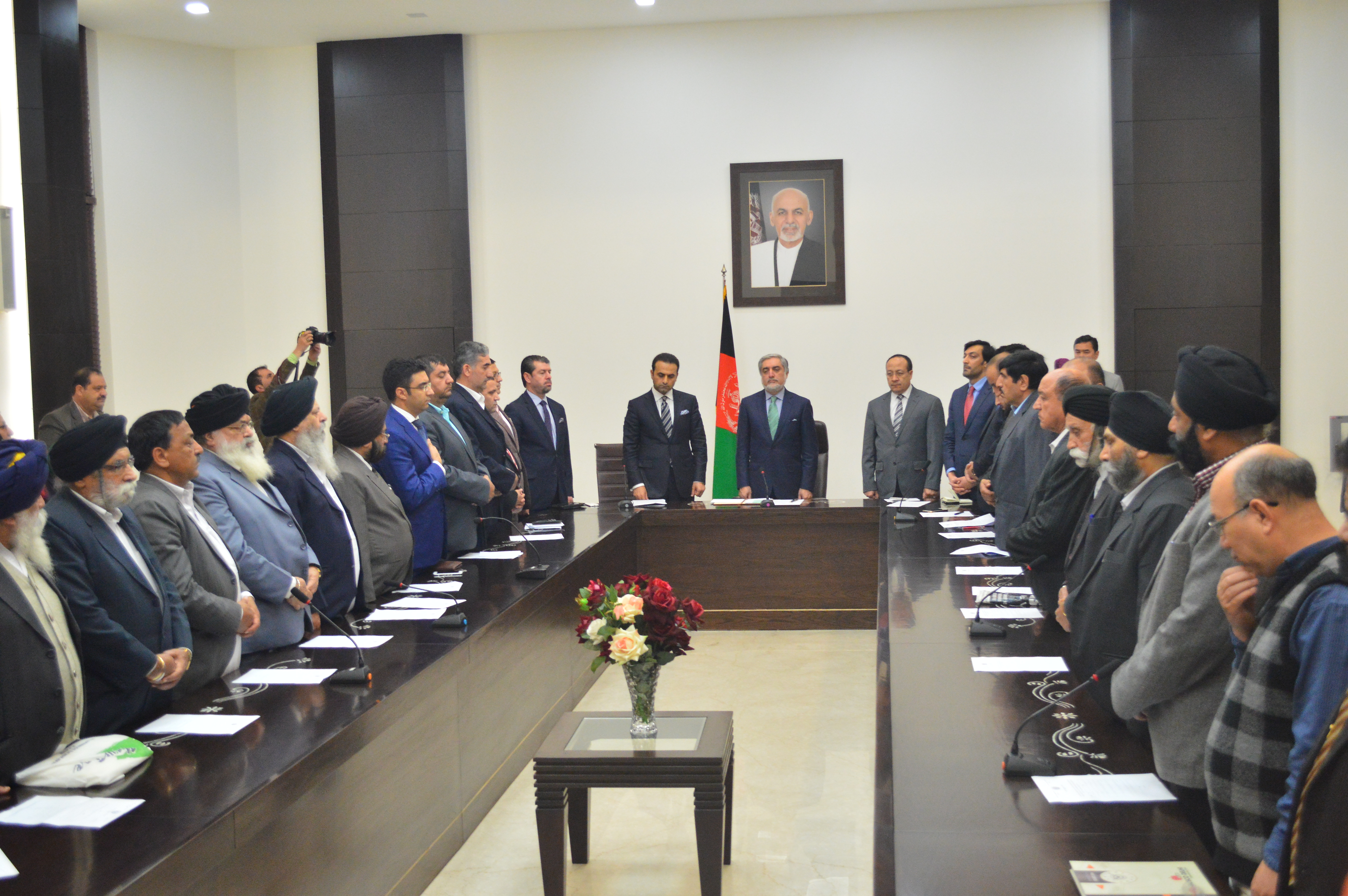
Abdullah Abdullah with the Afghan Hindu and Afghan Sikh leaders inside the Embassy of Afghanistan in New Delhi, India

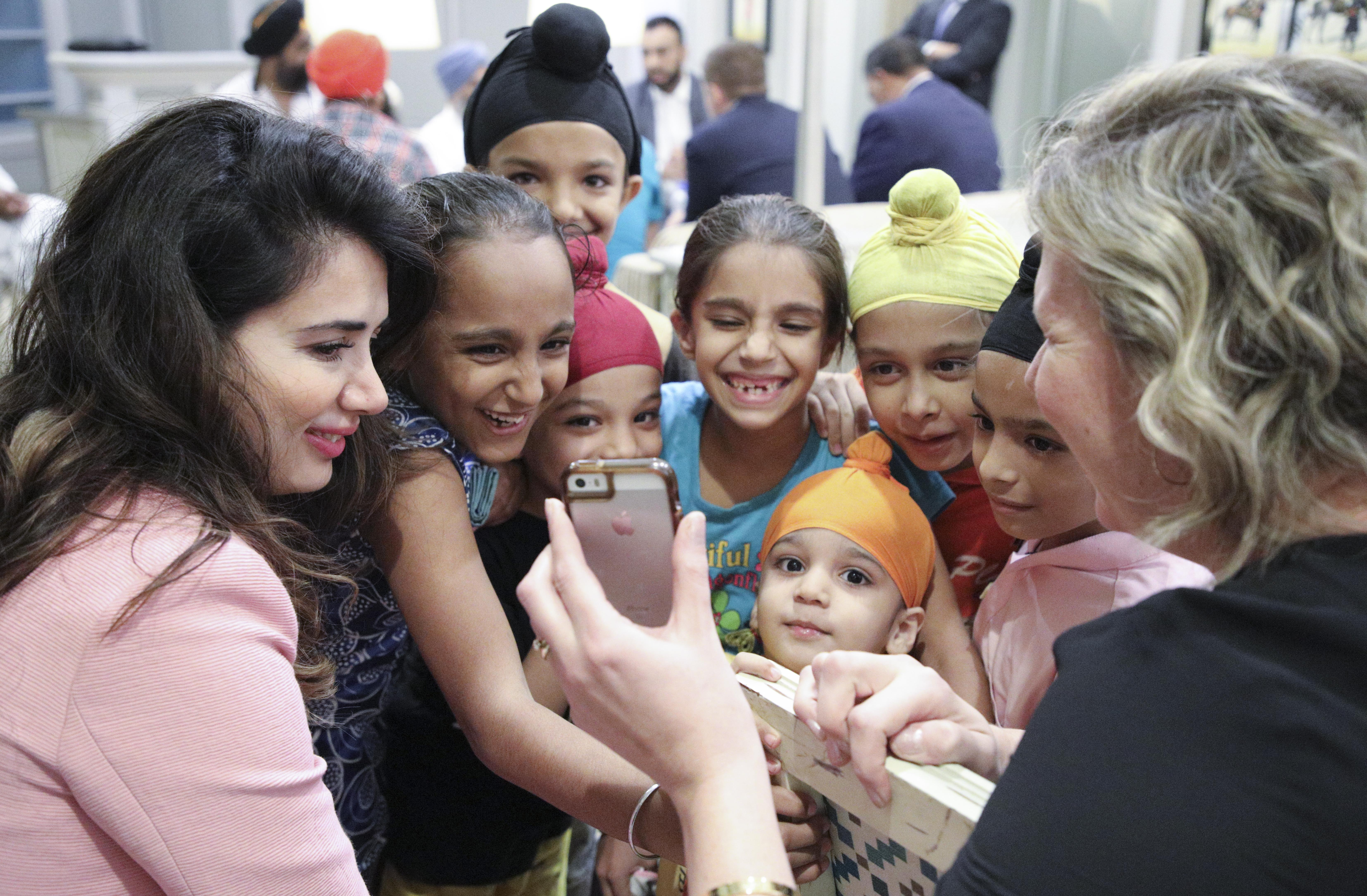
Afghan Sikhs in India

Sikhism in Afghanistan in the contemporary era is limited to small communities, primarily in major cities, with the largest numbers of Afghan Sikhs living in Jalalabad, Ghazni, Kabul, and to a lesser extent in Kandahar and Khost. Sikhs have been the most prevalent non-Muslim minority in Afghanistan, and despite the many political changes in recent Afghan history, governments and political groups have generally not indulged in openly discriminating against the Sikh minority; however, their status have been severely impacted amid the country's conflict since 1978.

The origin of the Sikh community in Afghanistan has broadly two streams, including indigenous Pashto and Dari speakers, descendants of converts to the teaching of the Sikhism's founder Guru Nanak during his trip to Kabul around 1520. The second stream derive from the later Sikh Empire as it pushed westward, establishing trading routes for Sikh merchants into Kandahar and Kabul; this group speak Hindko, a dialect of Punjabi. Due to this mixed ancestry, Afghan Sikhs are from various ethnolinguistic backgrounds including Pashtun, Hindkowan or Punjabi.

Once numbering in the tens of thousands, the population of Afghan Sikhs and Afghan Hindus has dwindled since the 1990s. Estimates of their total population (there has been no census in Afghanistan since 1979; the 1979 census recorded Afghanistan's total population as 13,051,358. It was the only nationwide census conducted according to modern criteria. according to the 1979 census, Muslims numbered 13,020,810 (99.77%), Hindus 27,344 (0.21%), while 3,204 people (0.02%) were recorded as having no religious affiliation) have been given as around 1,200 families or 8,000 members in 2013; 1,000 in 2019 (as reported by Afghan Sikh Wolesi Jirga member Narinder Singh Khalsa); and around 70 to 80 families or 700 in 2020 (as reported by Raj Sutaka, a Sikh businessman from Kabul). Thousands of Afghan Sikhs now live in India, the United Kingdom, the United States, and Canada.

== Presence ==
=== Jalalabad ===
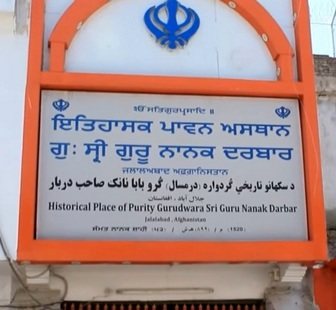
A sign at the Sri Guru Nanak Darbar Gurdwara in Jalalabad, Afghanistan

As of 2001, Jalalabad had 100 Sikh families, totaling around 700 people, who worship at two large Gurdwaras. Legend states that the older of the Gurudwaras was built to commemorate the visit of Guru Nanak Dev. On 1 July 2018, at least 10 Sikhs were killed in a targeted suicide bombing at the PD1 market. The local branch of the Islamic State of Iraq and the Levant claimed responsibility.

=== Kabul ===
There were thousands of Afghan Sikhs in the 1980s, but after the start of the Civil War in 1992, most had fled the country. Seven of Kabul's eight gurdwaras were destroyed during the civil war. Only Gurdwara Karte Parwan, located in the Karte Parwan section of Kabul, remains. They are centred today in Karte Parwan and some parts of the old city. There is no exact number of Sikhs in Kabul Province but sources in the past have estimated that around 3,000 Hindus and Sikhs exist there.

=== Kandahar ===
Kandahar has a very small Sikh community, with only about 15 families living there as of 2002.

=== Khost ===
It was reported in 2024 that at least one Sikh family reside in Khost. The city had a prevalent Pashto-speaking Sikh community up until the 1970's, which later immigrated to India, Russia, Belgium, Austria, and the United Kingdom.

== History ==
=== Early history ===
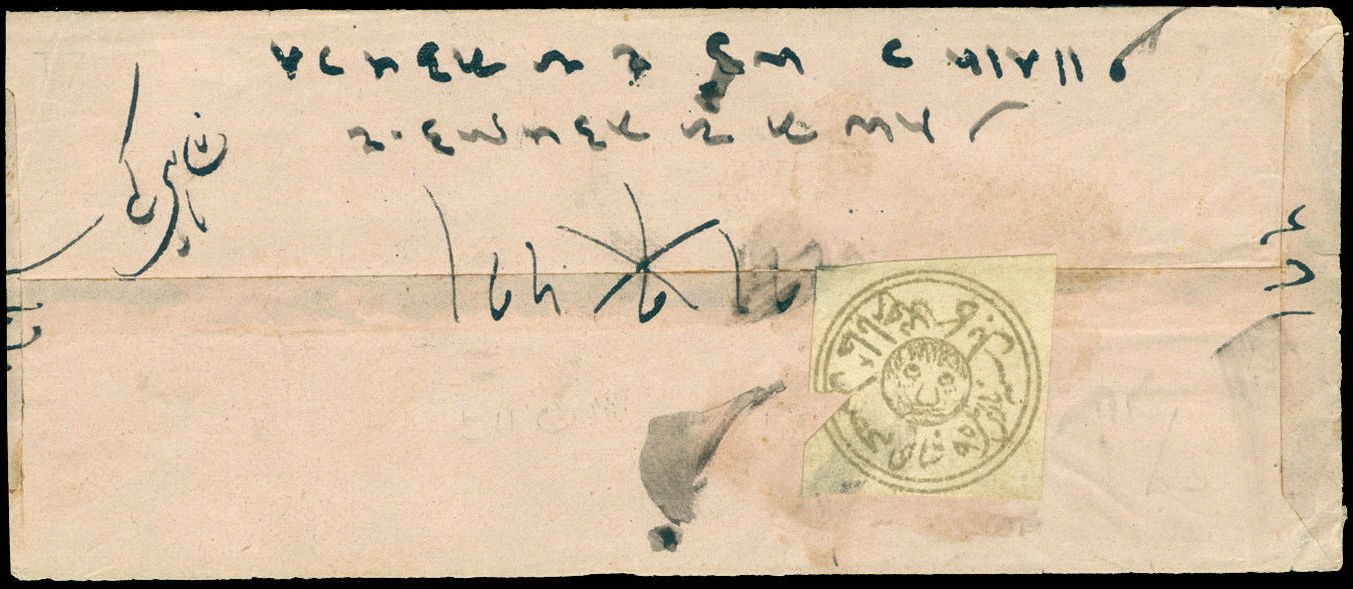
Bi-scriptal postcard from Kabul, Afghanistan where Persian is written in Perso-Arabic script and Punjabi is written in a Landa script, ca.1878

Guru Nanak visited Kabul in the 15th century. He is traditionally known as Peer Balagdaan by his followers in Afghanistan. Some early Khatri Sikhs established and maintained colonies in Afghanistan for trading purposes. Later, conflicts between the Sikh misls and Sikh Empire of Punjab Province against the Afghan-based Durrani Empire led to tension in the region. Sikhs also served in the British Empire's military against the Afghans during the Anglo-Afghan Wars.

=== 20th century ===
Following the 1947 partition of India, the Sikh population increased in Afghanistan as Sikh migrants fled persecution from the Pothohar region of newly formed country of Pakistan. The Sikhs prospered during the 1933-1973 reign of Mohammad Zahir Shah, and during period of strongly secular period of Soviet rule.

During the 1980s Soviet–Afghan War, many Afghan Sikhs fled to India, where 90% of global Sikh population lives; a second, much larger wave followed following the 1992 fall of the Najibullah regime. Sikh gurdwaras throughout the country were destroyed in the Battle of Jalalabad (1989) and the Afghan Civil War of the 1990s, leaving only the Gurdwara Karte Parwan in Kabul.

Under the Islamic Emirate of Afghanistan (1996–2001), the Sikhs were forced to pay the jizya tax. In addition, Sikhs were required to wear yellow patches or veils to identify themselves. Their custom of cremation of the dead was also prohibited during the War in Afghanistan (2001–2021), and cremation grounds were sometimes vandalized by local people.

=== 21st century ===
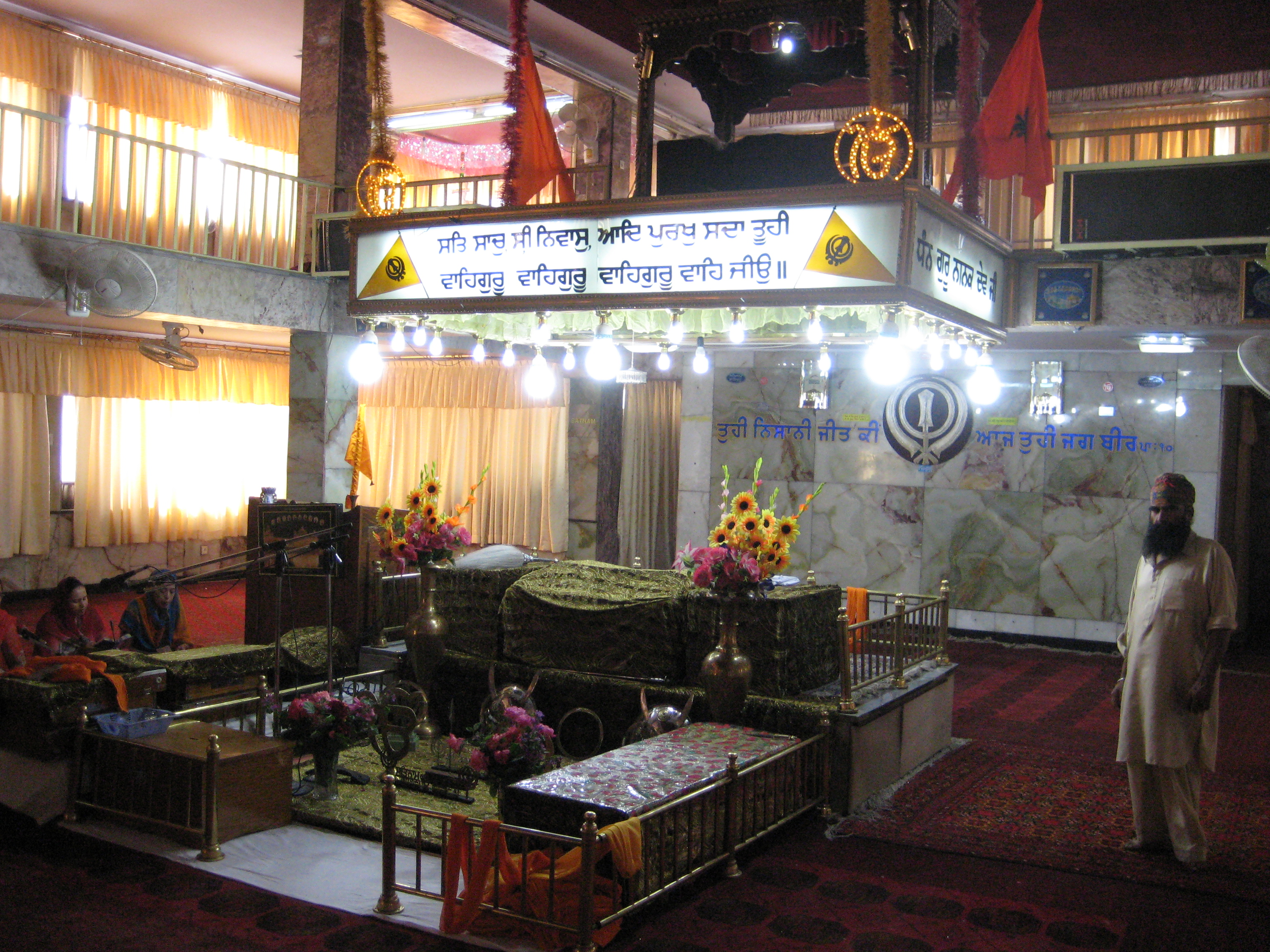
Interior of Gurdwara Karte Parwan in Kabul

By tradition, Sikhs cremate their dead, an act considered sacrilege in Islam. Cremation has become a major issue among Sikh Afghans, as traditional cremation grounds have been appropriated by Muslims, particularly in the Qalacha area of Kabul, which Sikhs and Hindus had used for over a century. In 2003 Sikhs complained to the Afghan government regarding the loss of cremation grounds, which had forced them to send a dead body to Pakistan to be cremated, following which the Minister of Hajj and Religious Affairs investigated the issue. Though the grounds were reported as returned to Sikh control in 2006, in 2007 local Muslims allegedly beat Sikhs attempting to cremate a community leader, and the funeral proceeded only with police protection. As of 2010, cremation in Kabul is still reported as being disapproved of by locals.

In September 2013, Afghan President Hamid Karzai signed a legislative decree, reserving a seat in the National Assembly of Afghanistan for the Hindu and Sikh minority. However this decree was blocked by the parliament. The decree eventually came into force in September 2016 when it was approved by the cabinet of Karzai's successor, Ashraf Ghani. Narendra Singh Khalsa was elected to this seat at the subsequent general election.

Following the deadly Jalalabad attack in June 2018, both Karzai and Ghani visited the Gurdwara Karte Parwan to offer condolences. Ghani called the country's Sikh and Hindu minorities the "pride of the nation", and on another occasion that year called them an "integral part" of Afghanistan's history.

The country is witnessing a gradual increase in the community's population with the coming of Taliban back in power. During and after the 2021 fall of Kabul, several members have sought refuge to other countries.

== Demographics ==
It was recently reported that only around 43 Afghan Sikhs reside in Afghanistan. They once numbered in the tens of thousands. Most have immigrated to other countries around the world.

The population ratio between Afghan Sikhs and Afghan Hindus has been estimated to be 60:40, as both populations are frequently merged in historic and contemporary estimations.

In the ensuing decades, widespread emigration was common amongst religious minorities due to increased persecution by Taliban forces; by the 1990s, the Afghan Sikh population declined below 50,000. In 2013, there were around 800 Hindu and Sikh families of which 300 families lived in Kabul. Sikh leaders in Afghanistan claimed that the total number of Sikhs was 3,000. Many Sikh families have chosen to emigrate to other countries including, India, North America, the European Union, the United Kingdom, Pakistan, Russia and other places.

== Notable people ==
- Jai Singh Fani, 1st Sikh to be elected as a Member of Parliament in Afghanistan
- Gajinder Singh Safri, Member of Parliament in Afghanistan
- Awtar Singh, member of the National Assembly of Afghanistan
- Anarkali Kaur Honaryar, member of the Afghan Independent Human Rights Commission and 2009 Radio Free Europe Afghanistan "Person of the Year"
- Narendra Singh Khalsa, Member of Parliament in Afghanistan

== See also ==
- Punjabis in Afghanistan
- July 2018 Jalalabad suicide bombing
- Kabul gurdwara attack
