= Afghans in India =

Afghan diaspora in India

Total population
- 15,806 Afghan refugees (2021); 4,504 Afghan students (2021)

Regions with significant populations
- Delhi · Kolkata · Bengaluru · Visakhapatnam · Hyderabad

Languages
- Hindi · Urdu · Pashto · Dari

Religion
- Hinduism · Sikhism · Islam · Christianity

Afghan Indians are Indian citizens and non-citizen residents born in, or with ancestors from, Afghanistan. As of early 2021, there are at least 15,806 Afghans temporarily residing in India under a special protection and care of the United Nations High Commissioner for Refugees (UNHCR).

== History ==
The earliest record of Afghans in India is during the late 13th century when they began migrating during the Khalji dynasty who formed an empire in Northern India. It was founded by Jalal ud din Firuz Khalji and became the second Muslim dynasty to rule the Delhi sultanate of India. The Lodi dynasty ruled Northern India until the invasion of Babur in 1526, at which point the Mughal Empire was created. During this period Afghans from Kabulistan began arriving to India for business and pleasure. The Sur Empire replaced the Mughal Empire from 1540 to 1557. Other Pashtuns began invading India until the Sikh Empire came to power. This formed a barrier between Afghanistan (Durrani Empire) and British India. Afghans were required visas to enter India after this period.

The distinguished military general and eminent Sufi saint, Malik Ibrahim Bayu of Ghazni, came to Delhi in the early 14th century to serve under the tutelage of Sultan Muhammad bin Tughlaq, becoming commander-in-chief in 1324 AD. As a general, he was sent by The Sultan to punish the Raja Bithal, the Governor (Subedar) of Bihar, due to several complaints he had received against the governor, and furthermore, because of his tyranny and rebellious nature towards The Sultan of Delhi. After a fierce battle, the Raja was killed and his army was defeated. The conquest of Bihar was a brilliant achievement, and on this occasion, the Sultan conferred upon Syed Ibrahim Malik the title of "Madarul Mulk" means Malik or Saif-o-Daulat (Administrator and King of Sword and Wealth). Following Syed Ibrahim Malik's remarkable conquest, he was appointed the Governor of the State of Bihar, after which he chose to settle with his family and relatives in Bihar Sharif. He served as the governor of Bihar and general for a few years, from 1351 to 1353 AD, and during his time as general in Bihar, led many expeditions such as Deora and Khatangi, along with others. When the fighting had finally stopped, Syed Ibrahim Malik established law and order in the region. After peace prevailed, one night, when Syed Ibrahim Malik Baya headed out of the fort, he was assassinated by a group of enemy soldiers, hidden in the darkness outside. Syed Ibrahim Malik died on Sunday, 13th Dul Hajj 753 AH/20 January 1353 AD. His body was brought to Bihar Sharif for burial, where he had lived nearly his entire life with his family, relatives, and kinsmen.

The Pashtun ruler of Bihar Sher Shah Suri (Farid Khan) defeated the Mughal emperor Humayun in 1540. After his accidental death in 1545, his son Islam Shah became his successor. He first served as a private before rising to become a commander in the Mughal army under Babur and then as the governor of Bihar. In 1537, when Babur's son Humayun was elsewhere on an expedition, Sher Shah overran the state of Bengal and established the Sur Dynasty. A brilliant strategist, Sher Shah proved himself a gifted administrator as well as a capable general. His reorganization of the empire laid the foundations for the later Mughal emperors, notably Akbar, son of Humayun. He extended the Grand Trunk Road from Chittagong in the frontiers of the province of Bengal in near eastern India to Kabul in Afghanistan in the far northwest of the country.

During the 19th century, many Afghans migrated to India. Prominent among them were the families of Nawab of Sardhana and the Qizilbashi Agha family of Srinagar, Kashmir. Both the families had martial lineage and belonged to the feudal aristocracy.

=== Partition of India and the arrival of Afghan refugees ===
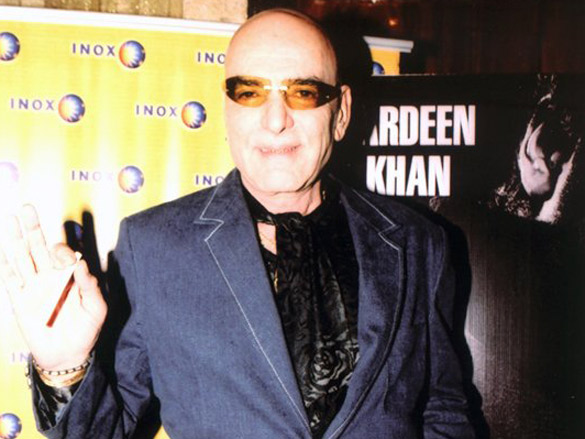
Bollywood actor and director Feroz Khan in 2005

Before and after the partition of India in 1947, a number of Afghans left their native areas in order to take permanent residency in major Indian cities such as Mumbai and Bangalore. Some of those immigrants got involved in the Bollywood film industry, which had already been dominated by people originating from the Pashtunistan region. Some of the well-known Indian actors and producers of Afghan heritage are Feroz Khan, Salim Khan and Kader Khan. All of the early Afghans have acquired citizenship of India in accordance with Indian law. As such, they are widely recognized as Indians.

After the start of the Soviet–Afghan War in 1979, approximately 60,000 Afghans took temporary residency in India, most of them being Hindu and Sikh Afghans. Many of them have subsequently immigrated to countries in Europe, North America and Oceania. Some have returned to their native areas in Afghanistan after the formation of the Karzai administration in late 2001. Those that remained in India have applied for citizenship of India.

On January 1, 2016, Adnan Sami became a citizen of India. He is Pashtun from his father Arshad Sami Khan's side. Adnan's grandfather General Mehfooz Jan hailed from Herat in Afghanistan and was the governor of four provinces in that country, namely Herat, Kabul, Nangarhar and Balkh, under the reign of King Amanullah Khan. Adnan's great-grandfather General Ahmed Jan was the military adviser to King Abdur Rahman Khan. General Ahmed Jan was the conqueror of Kafiristan and named it Nuristan. However, at the time of the Habibullah Kalakani revolution in Afghanistan, Adnan's grandfather General Mehfooz Jan was assassinated. The family moved to Peshawar, which was a part of British India at that time.

According to UNHCR, India currently hosts at least 15,806 Afghan refugees within its borders. Religiously, they include Hindus, Sikhs, Muslims, and Christians The majority of them reside in the capital Delhi, specifically in the neighborhoods of Lajpat Nagar, Bhogal and Malviya Nagar. In addition to the refugees, thousands of Afghan students study in Indian universities.

Afghan citizens use India as a temporary place of residence until they are firmly settled in countries of Europe, North America or Oceania. Those who are denied admission into those countries can either remain in India, travel to another country, or return to Afghanistan. In 2021, following the end of the latest war in Afghanistan, India offered an emergency visa (the 'e-Emergency X-Misc Visa') to some Afghan nationals. Much of Afghanistan's Christian community thrives within India. Prior to 2021, Some Afghani refugees have trouble getting long term visas enabling work and permission to study despite being granted refugee status by UNHCR. Many had issues with enrolling their children in school. Despite these difficulties, some had managed to operate "shops, restaurants and pharmacies."

== Pashto-speaking communities in India ==
The following are places where Pashtun culture can be found: Madhya Pradesh (Bhopal and Indore); Punjab (Maler Kotla); Bihar (Gaya, Sherghati, Patna, Aurangabad and Sasaram); and Uttar Pradesh (Malihabad, Etawah, Shahjahanpur, Rampur).

There are a large number of Pashto-speaking Pashtuns in the Indian states of Assam and West Bengal and the territory of Jammu and Kashmir. Although their exact numbers are hard to determine, it is at least in excess of 100,000 for it is known that in 1954 over 100,000 nomadic Pakhtuns living in Kashmir Valley were granted Indian citizenship. Today jirgas are frequently held. Those settled and living in the Kashmir Valley speak Pashto, and are found chiefly in the southwest of the valley, where Pashtun colonies have from time to time been founded. The most interesting are the Kukikhel Afridis of Dramghaihama, who retain all the old customs and speak Pashto. They wear colorful dress and carry swords and shields. The Afridis and the Machipurians, who belong to the Yusufzai tribe, are liable to military service, in return for which they hold certain villages free of revenue. The Pashtuns chiefly came in under the Durranis, but many were brought by Maharajah Gulab Singh for service on the frontier. Pashto is also spoken in two villages, Dhakki and Changnar (Chaknot), located on the Line of Control in Kupwara district. In response to demand by the Pashtun community living in the state, Kashir TV has recently launched a series of Pushto-language programs.

== See also ==
- Afghanistan–India relations
- Indians in Afghanistan
