= Narendra Singh Khalsa =

Sikh Afghan politician

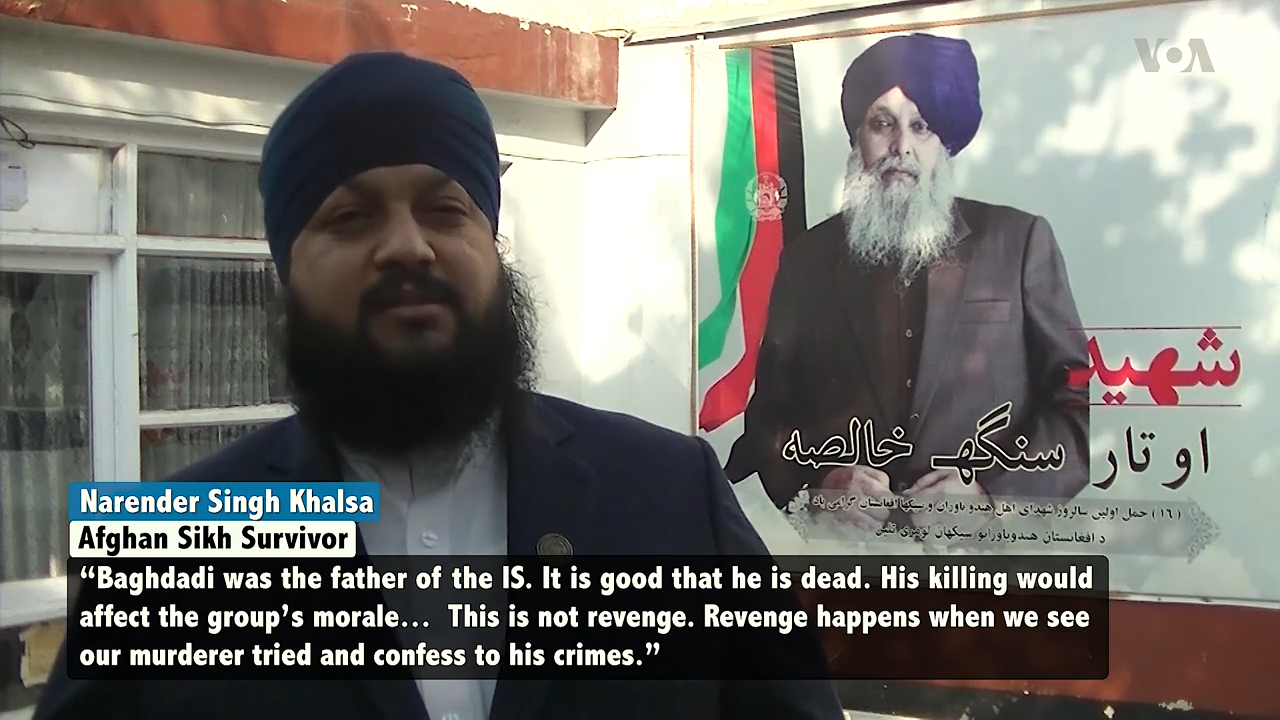

Member of Wolesi Jirga
- In office 2018–2021
- Preceded by: Constituency established
- Succeeded by: Office abolished
- Constituency: Sikh/Hindu minority

Personal details
- Born: 1980 (age 45–46) Afghanistan
- Occupation: Politician

Narendra Singh Khalsa is a Sikh Afghan politician. In January 2019, he secured a seat in the Lower House of the Parliament (Wolesi Jirga) in the 2018 Afghan parliamentary election, on behalf of the Sikh and Hindu communities.

He is the son of Awtar Singh Khalsa, a Sikh representative to the Loya Jirga from Paktia province of Afghanistan. His father Awtar Singh died in the September 2018 Jalalabad suicide bombing.

On 22 August 2021, Khalsa came to India along with other Indians who were rescued by Indian forces from Afghanistan due to Taliban Siege of Afghanistan 2021. In April 2024, Khalsa returned to Afghanistan after being assured of his safety and property under the Taliban government.
