= Gurdwara Karte Parwan =

Gurdwara in Kabul, Afghanistan

Karte Parwan Gurudwara
- Punjabi: ਕਰਤੇ ਪਰਵਾਨ ਸਾਹਿਬ
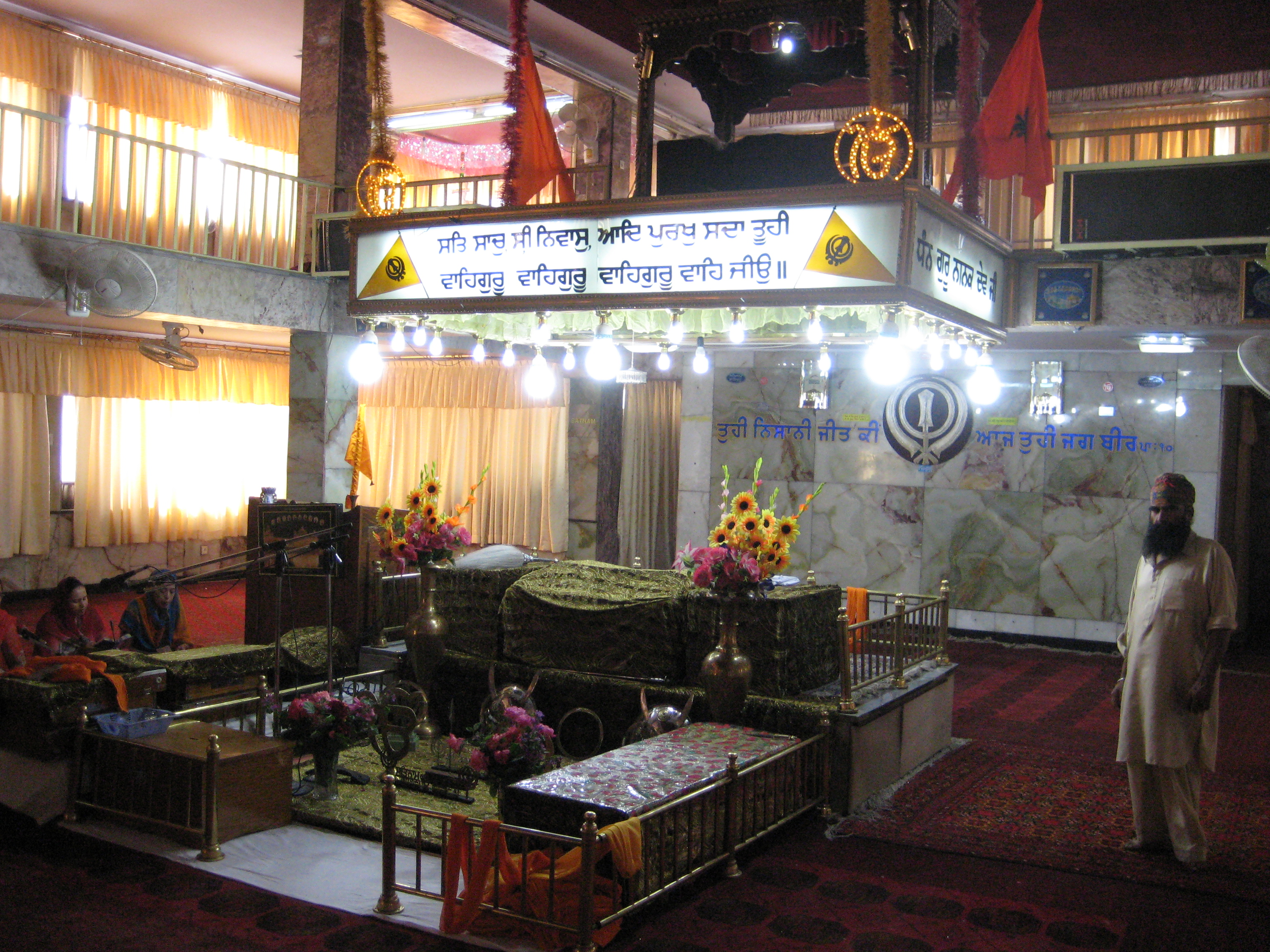

Religion
- Affiliation: Sikhism
- Province: Kabul Province
- Ecclesiastical or organisational status: Active

Location
- Location: Karte Parwan, Kabul
- Country: Afghanistan
- Interactive map of Karte Parwan Gurudwara
- Coordinates: 34.53°N 69.13°E

Architecture
- Type: Sikh architecture

The Karte Parwan Gurdwara is a place of assembly and worship for Afghan Sikhs in Kabul, Afghanistan. Located in the Karte Parwan neighborhood, it is one of the main gurdwaras in Central Asia. Gurdawara means the Gateway to the Guru.

== History ==
The Karte Parwan Gurdwara was built in the 1960s, when there were thousands of Sikhs living in Kabul. After the start of the Soviet–Afghan War in 1979, many began escaping to other countries. In 2008 there were an estimated 3,000 Hindus and Sikhs in Afghanistan. Most of them immigrated to other countries. The road outside the Karte Parwan Gurdwara was widened prior to 2009 and the two rows of buildings and its courtyard have been reduced in size.

=== 2021 vandalism ===
On 5 October 2021, Indian news sources reported that unidentified Taliban members forcibly entered the Karte Parwan Gurdwara and began vandalizing the place.

=== 2022 terrorist attack ===
On 18 June 2022, suspected members of the Islamic State-Khorasan Province (ISIS-K) stormed the Karte Parwan Gurdwara and fired at worshippers. Later that day, the Afghan Ministry of Interior announced that three attackers had been killed by Afghan security forces and the gunfight resulted in the death of one Taliban soldier and a Sikh worshipper.

== Gallery ==
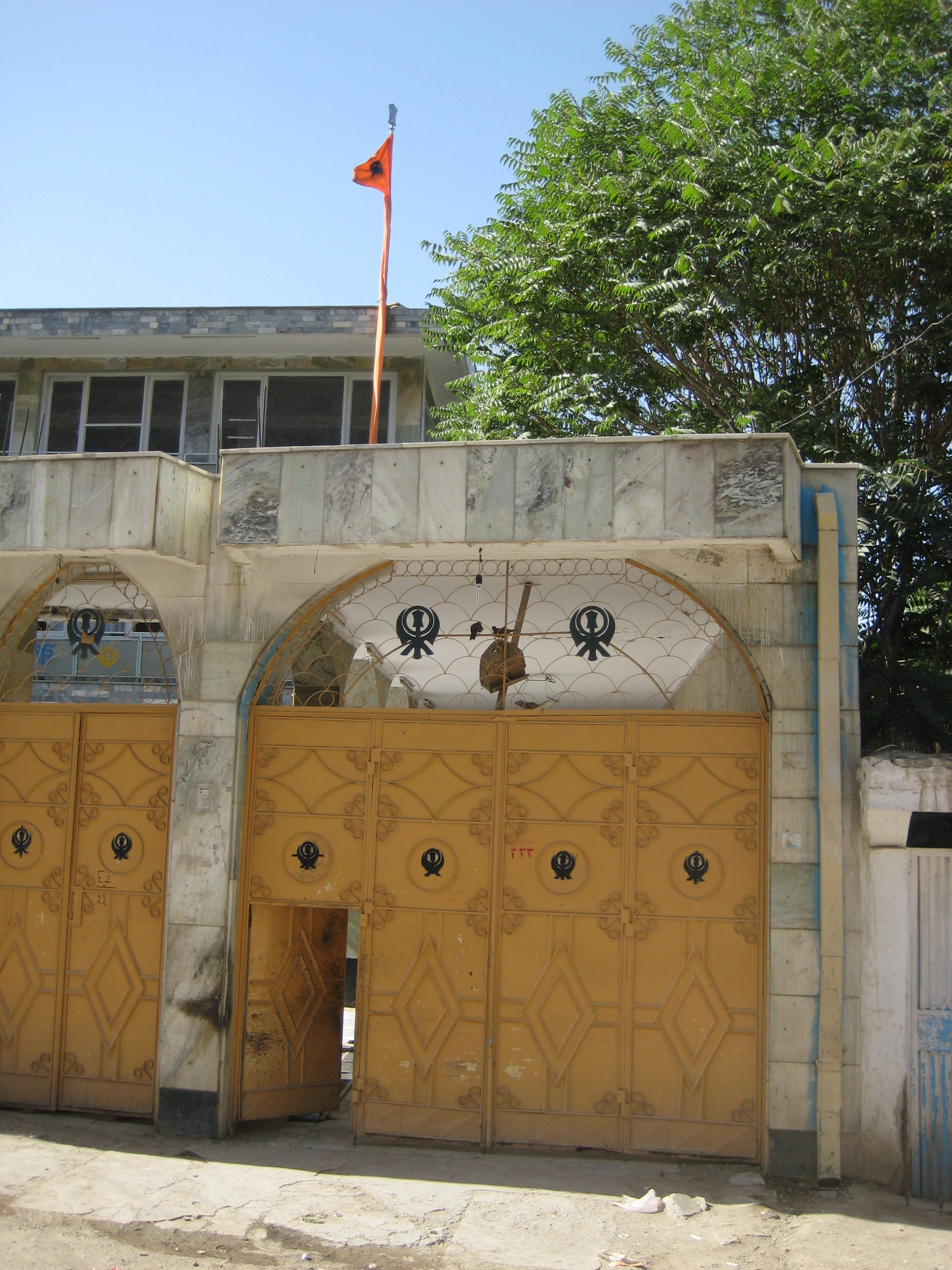
Front door of the Gurdwara Karte Parwan (2008)

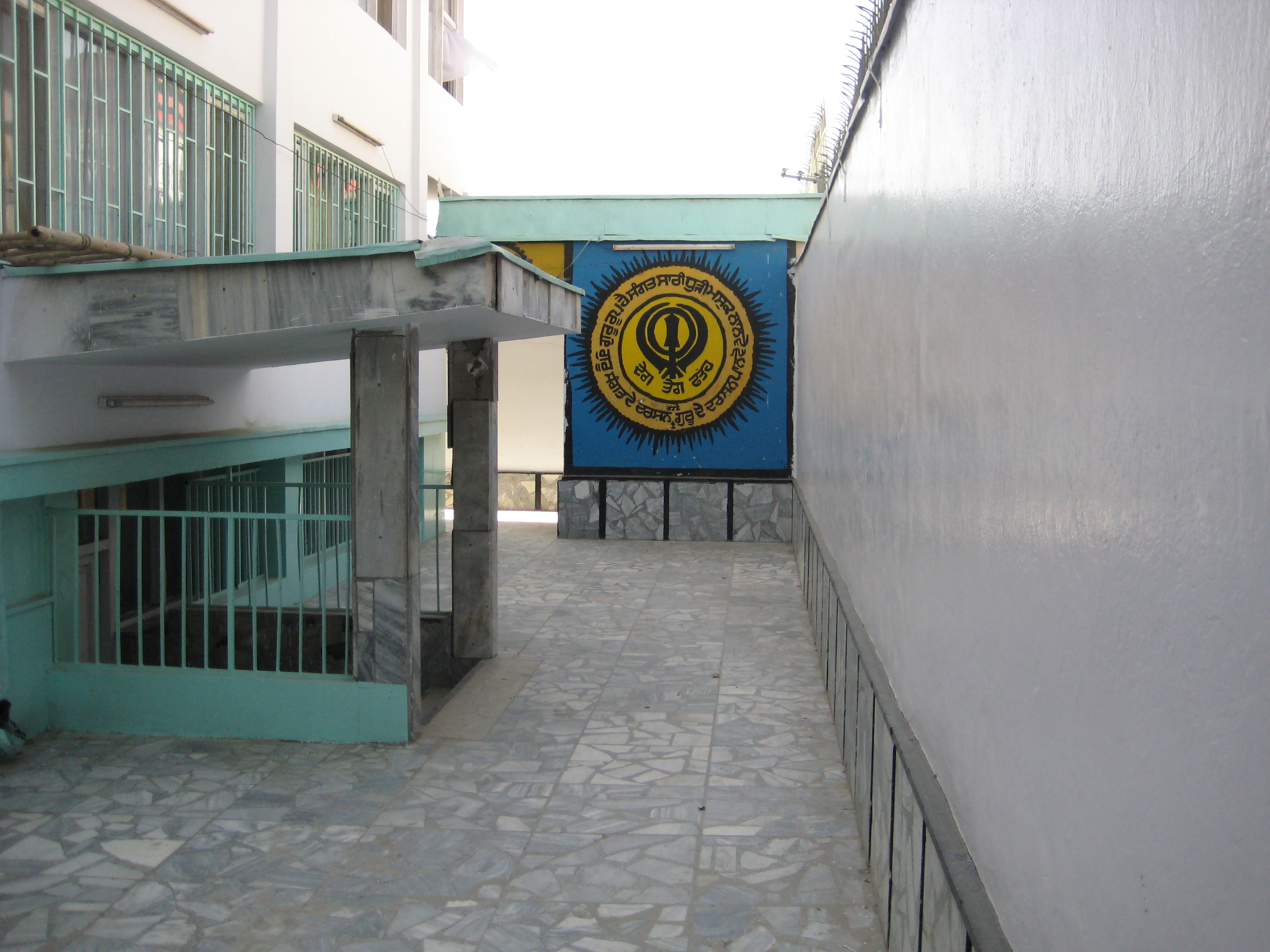
Walkway in the Gurdwara Karte Parwan (2008)

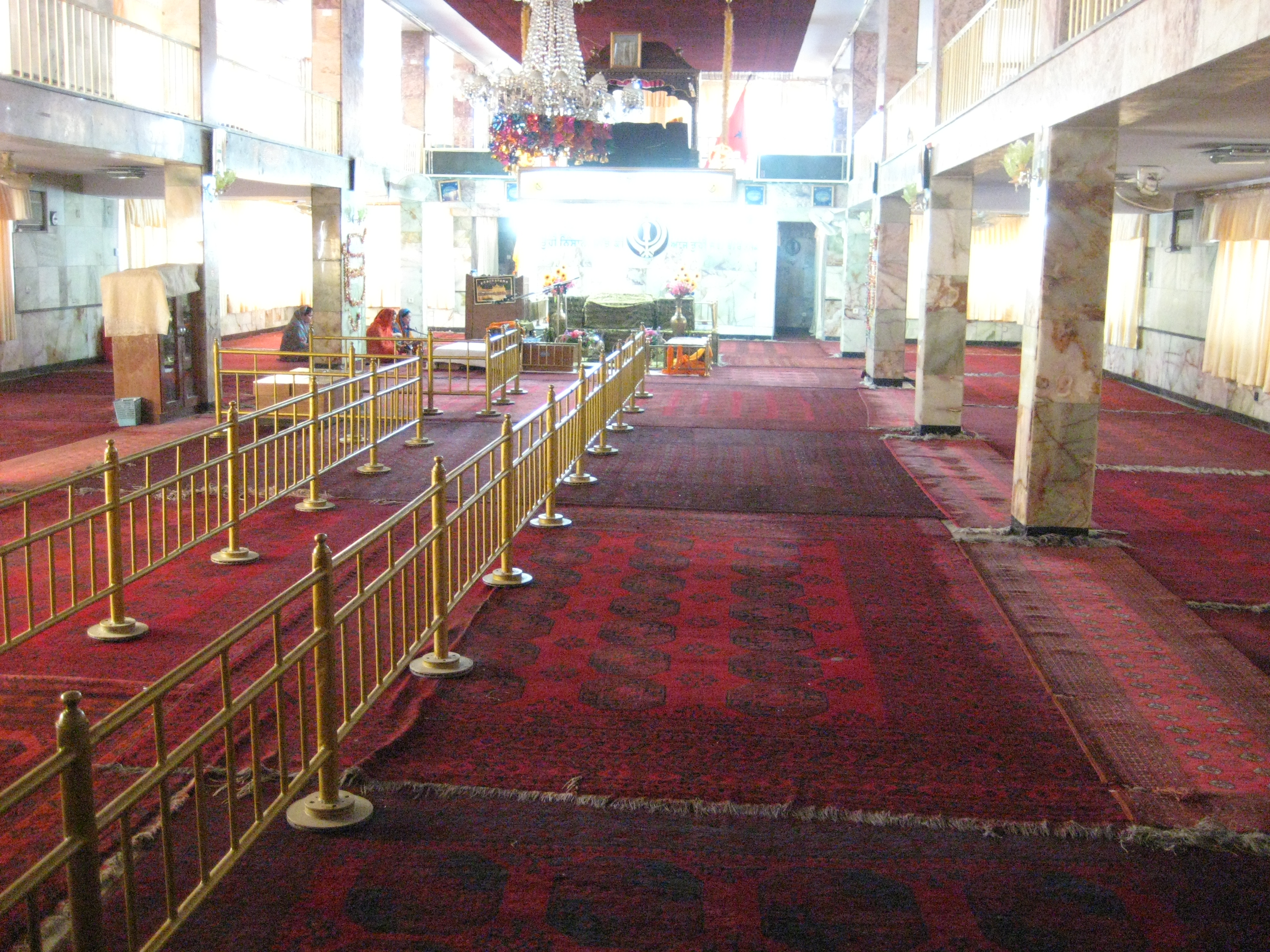
Inside the Gurdwara Karte Parwan (2008)

== See also ==
- Sikhism in Afghanistan
- Hinduism in Afghanistan
- Tourism in Afghanistan
