= Hindkowans =

Name of Hindko-speakers in Pakistan

ہندکووان
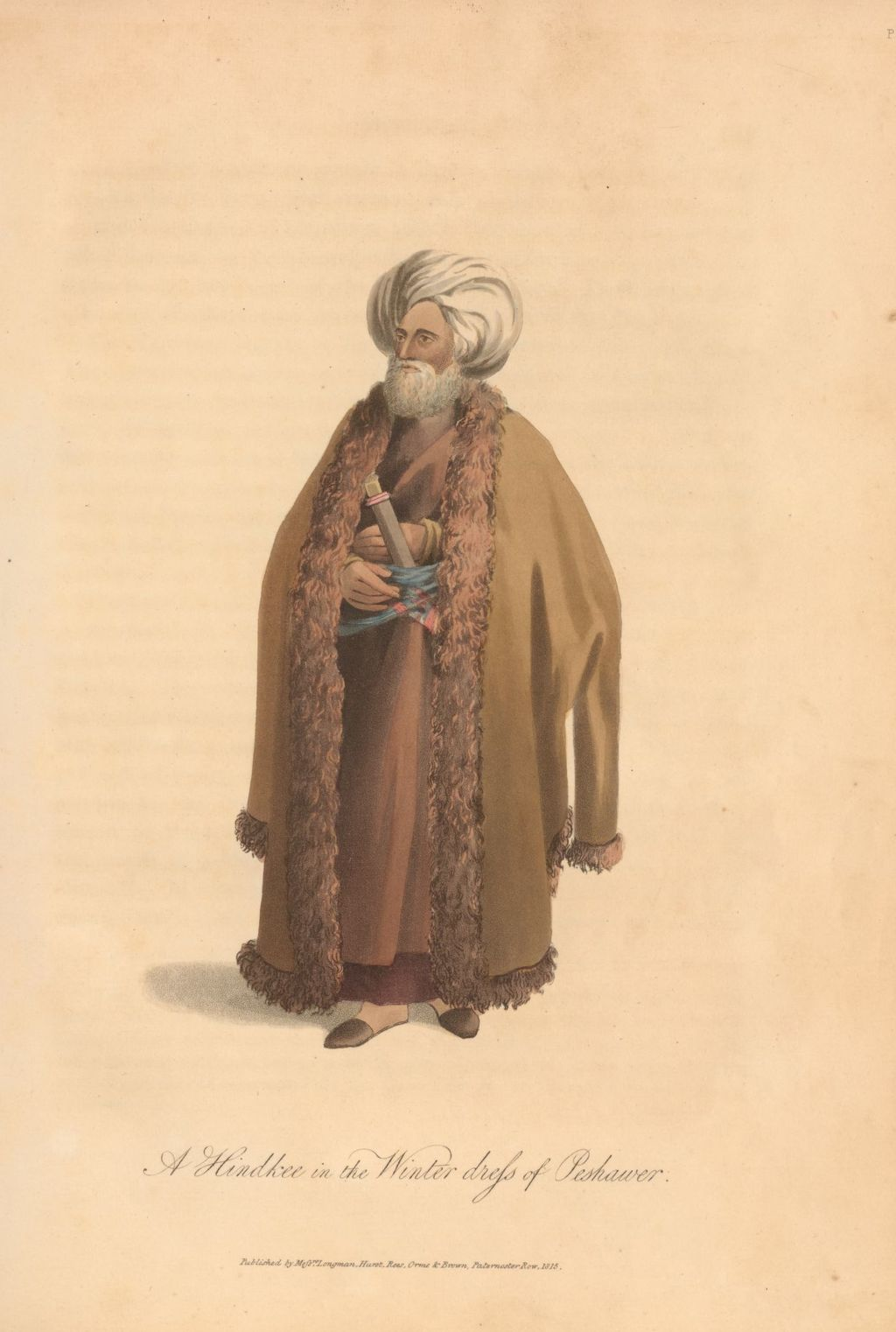
- Illustration of a Hindki in Peshawar in the book “An Account of the Kingdom of Caubul” (1815) by Mountstuart Elphinstone.

Regions with significant populations
- Khyber Pakhtunkhwa; Northwestern Punjab

Languages
- L1: Hindko (native language); L2: Urdu (national language)

Religion
- Islam
- Hindkowans are a linguistically defined group of people from Pakistan who primarily speak Hindko. They are of diverse ethnic origins, and it is the shared use of Hindko that forms the basis of their collective identity.

Hindkowans, also known as the Hindki, is a contemporary designation for speakers of Indo-Aryan languages who live among the neighbouring Pashtuns, particularly the speakers of various Hindko dialects of Lahnda. The origins of the term refer merely to the speakers of Indo-Aryan languages rather than to any particular ethnic group. The term is not only applied to several forms of "Northern Lahnda" but also, sometimes, to the Saraiki dialects in the districts of Dera Ghazi Khan, Mianwali, and Dera Ismail Khan, which border the southern Pashto-speaking areas.

There is no generic name for Hindko speakers because they belong to diverse ethnic groups and often identify themselves by the larger families or castes. However, the Hindko-speaking community belonging to the Hazara Division of Khyber Pakhtunkhwa is sometimes recognised collectively as Hazarewal, while the Hindko speaking urban population in the cities of Peshawar and Kohat is simply known as Pishoris and Kohatis, respectively.

Prior to the partition, the Hindu and Sikh Hindkowans exercised urban economic power in the North-West Frontier Province of British India. They were primarily traders and merchants and over time settled in areas as far as Kalat, Balochistan. Those Hindko speakers, mainly Hindu and Sikhs, who after the partition of British India migrated to the independent republic, identify with the broader Punjabi community; they reside in the Indian states of Punjab and Jammu and Kashmir.

There is also a small diaspora in Afghanistan, which includes members of the Hindu and Sikh community that was established during the Sikh Empire in the first half of the 19th century. Most of them have emigrated since the rise of the Taliban, and the total population of Sikhs, Hindko-speaking or not, was estimated at 300 families (as of 2018). These Hindko-speaking Hindus and Sikhs are commonly referred to as Hindki.

The 2023 census of Pakistan enumerated 5.5 million Hindko-speakers in the country.

== Origin ==
The word "Hindko" is a collective label for a diverse group of Lahnda (Western Punjabi) dialects of very different groups, not all of which are even geographically contiguous, spoken by people of various ethnic backgrounds throughout several areas in Pakistan, primarily in the provinces of Khyber Pakhtunkhwa and Punjab. The term Hindko literally means the "Indian language" or "language of Hind", (Note: "Indian" here refers to the historic meaning of India as the northern Indian subcontinent, which was known as Hindustan or Hind.) and has come to denote a group of Indo-Aryan dialects spoken in the former North-West Frontier Province, in contrast to the neighbouring Pashto, an Iranic language.

== Social setting ==
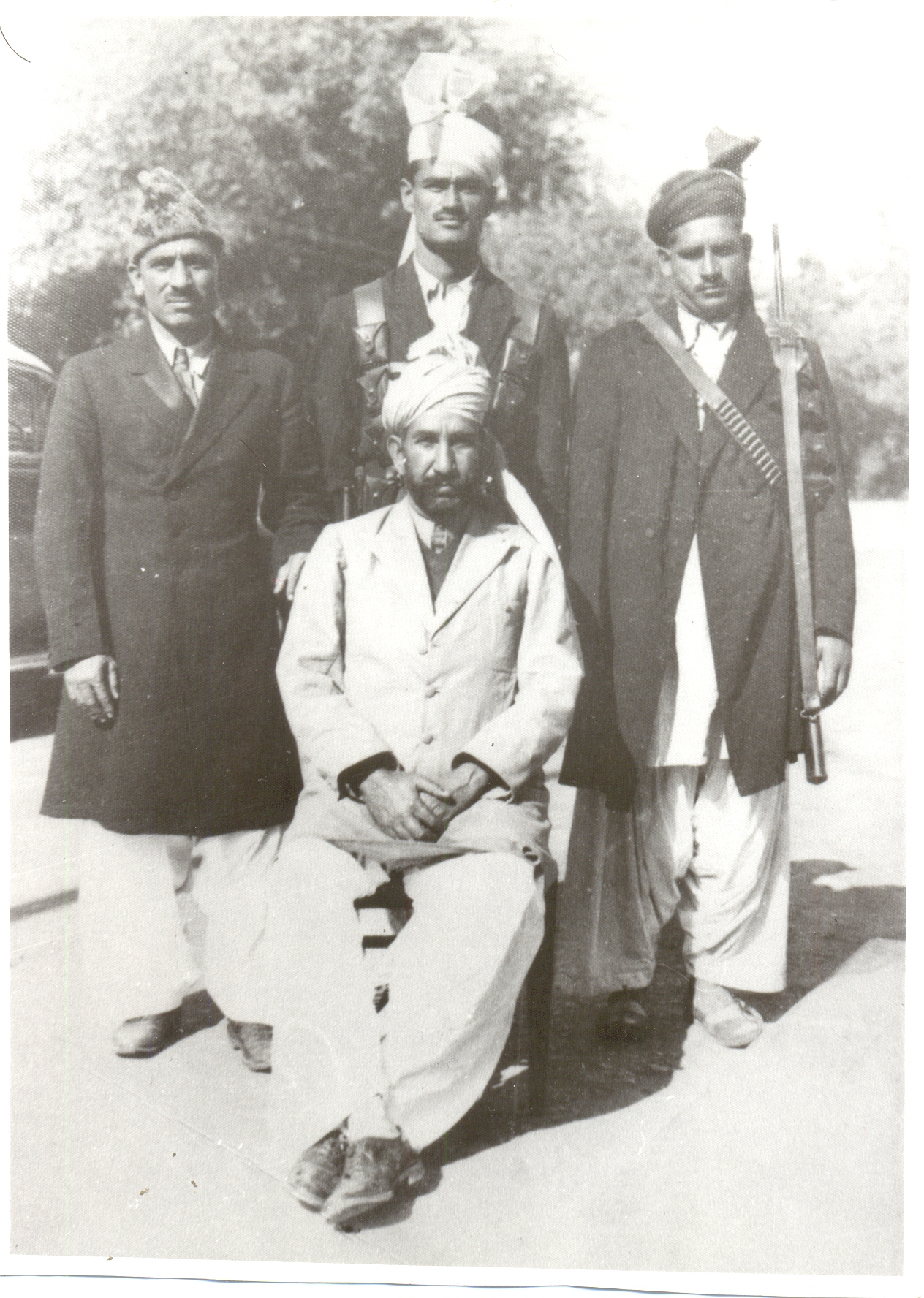
The Tanolis

In the medieval period, the people of Peshawar practiced Hinduism; the Aroras were among the castes who inhabited that area. During the Muslim rule in the region, significant conversions to Islam occurred and today, most of the Hindko-speaking population in Pakistan is Sunni Muslim. Hindko speakers of the Hindu and Sikh faiths, during the partition of India, migrated to the independent republic around 1947.

Hindko speakers often identify themselves by larger kinships, tribes or castes. The Hindko-speaking community belonging to the Hazara Division of Khyber Pakhtunkhwa are sometimes recognized collectively as Hazarewal. A portion of Hindko speakers in the Hazara Division claim Pashtun ancestry. Some of those speak Hindko as their first language, while others as a second language. Notable groups in the Hindko-speaking community include Gujjars, Tahirkheli, Yusufzai, Jadoon, Tareen), Khokhar, Sayyids, Awans, Mughals, Malik, Tanolis, Swatis, Turks, and Qureshis.

The most common second language for Hindko-speakers in Pakistan is Urdu and the second most common one is Pashto. In many Hindko-speaking areas, Pashto speakers live in the same or nearby communities although this is less true in Abbottabad and Kaghan Valley. The relationship between Hindko and its neighbors is not one of stable bilingualism. In terms of domains of use and number of speakers, Hindko is dominant and growing in the north-east; in Hazara for example, it is displacing Pashto as the language in use among the few Swati people who speak it, and in the Neelum Valley of Azad Jammu & Kashmir, it is gaining ground at the expense of the minority languages like Kashmiri. In the cities of Kohat and Peshawar, on the other hand, it is Hindko that is being replaced. With the exodus of the Hindko-speaking Hindus and Sikhs after partition and the consequent influx of Pashtuns into the vacated areas of the urban economy, there have been signs of a shift towards Pashto.

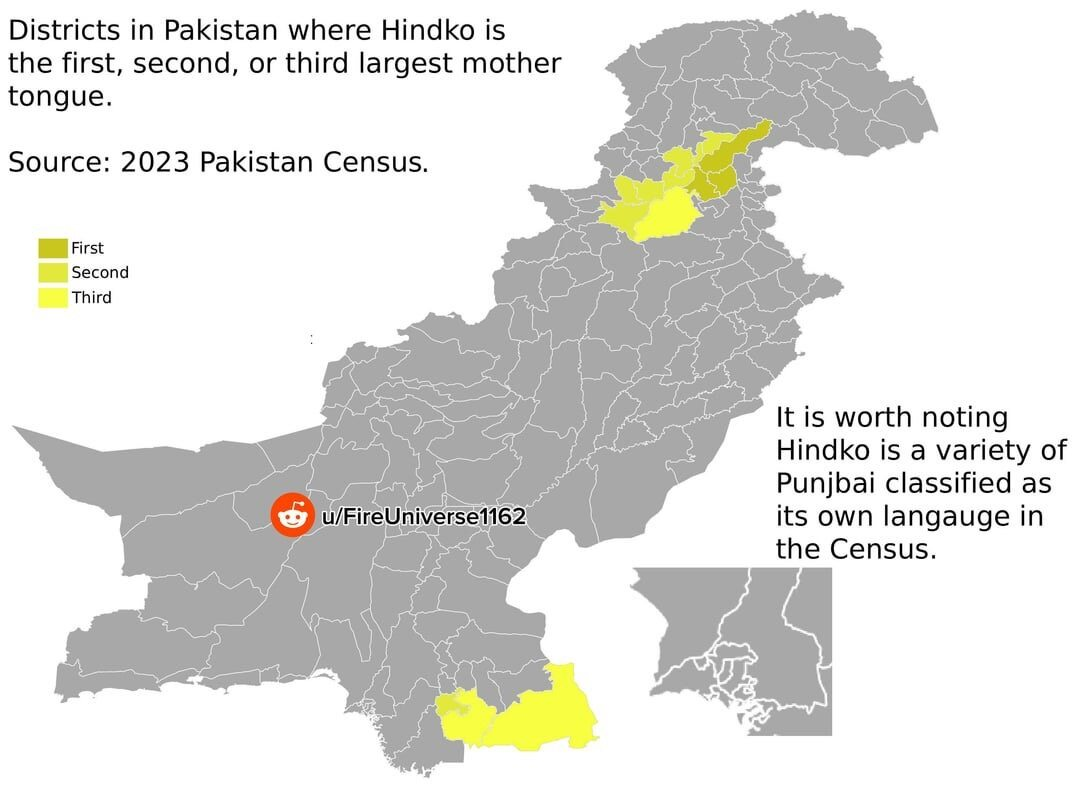
Hindko as a first, second, and third largest mother tongue by district.

== Notable Hindko-speakers ==
- Ahmad Faraz
- Akshaye Khanna
- Ali Khan Jadoon
- Anwar Shamim
- Asghar Khan
- Ayub Khan
- Azam Khan Swati
- Baba Haider Zaman
- Bashir Ahmad Bilour
- Bashir Jehangiri
- Dilip Kumar
- Firdous Jamal
- Gohar Ayub Khan
- Ghulam Ahmad Bilour
- Haider Zaman Khan
- Imran Ashraf
- Iqbal Zafar Jhagra
- Jalal Baba
- Mehtab Abbasi
- Mohammad Abdul Ghafoor Hazarvi
- Mulk Raj Anand
- Murtaza Javed Abbasi
- Omar Ayub Khan
- Qateel Shifai
- Raj Kapoor
- Sardar Zahoor Ahmad
- Sardar Muhammad Yousuf
- Salahuddin Tirmizi
- Shibli Faraz
- Vinod Khanna
- Yasir Hameed
- Zahirul Islam Abbasi

== See also ==
- Pahari people (Kashmir)
- Farsiwans

== Bibliography ==
- Masica, Colin P. (1991). The Indo-Aryan languages. Cambridge language surveys. Cambridge University Press. ISBN 978-0-521-23420-7.
- Rahman, Tariq (1996). Language and politics in Pakistan. Oxford University Press. ISBN 978-0-19-577692-8.
- Rensch, Calvin R. (1992). "The Language Environment of Hindko-Speaking People". In O'Leary, Clare F.; Rensch, Calvin R.; Hallberg, Calinda E. (eds.). Hindko and Gujari. Sociolinguistic Survey of Northern Pakistan. Islamabad: National Institute of Pakistan Studies, Quaid-i-Azam University and Summer Institute of Linguistics. ISBN 969-8023-13-5.
- Shackle, Christopher (1979). "Problems of classification in Pakistan Panjab". Transactions of the Philological Society. 77 (1): 191–210. doi:10.1111/j.1467-968X.1979.tb00857.x. ISSN 0079-1636.
- Akhtar, Raja Nasim; Rehman, Khawaja A. (2007). "The Languages of the Neelam Valley". Kashmir Journal of Language Research. 10 (1): 65–84. ISSN 1028-6640.
- Shackle, Christopher (1983). "Language, Dialect and Local Identity in Northern Pakistan". In Wolfgang-Peter Zingel; Stephanie Zingel-Avé Lallemant (eds.). Pakistan in Its Fourth Decade: Current Political, Social and Economic Situation and Prospects for the 1980s. Mitteilungen des Deutschen Orient-Instituts. Vol. 23. Hamburg: Deutsches Orient-Institut. pp. 175–87.
- Shackle, Christopher (1980). "Hindko in Kohat and Peshawar". Bulletin of the School of Oriental and African Studies. 43 (3): 482–510. doi:10.1017/S0041977X00137401. ISSN 0041-977X. S2CID 129436200.
