= Gajinder Singh Safri =

Sikh Member of Parliament in Afghanistan (1950-2020)

Gajinder Singh Safri (25 December 1950 – 12 January 2020) was the second Sikh to be elected as a Member of Parliament in Afghanistan. He was the brother-in-law of Jai Singh Fani, the first Sikh MP, and secured representation in the 1988 parliamentary election. Safri fled to the United Kingdom after the Najbullah Ministry abdicated power in 1992; he has testified before the United Kingdom Immigration Appeal Tribunal as an expert witness about the severe risks faced by Hindus and Sikhs in Afghanistan under Taliban and the Mujahideen.
