= Jainism in Afghanistan =

Jain artwork ruins have been discovered at sites in Afghanistan. According to Pratapaditya Pal, these pieces were found along with coins during road construction projects, and they "almost certainly were imported from India", likely ancient Gujarat for stylistic reasons. It shows the base of a Svetambara altarpiece for a Jina along with his protective deity, the four armed Hindu goddess of wisdom and learning, Saraswati. It is likely from the 10th-century or later, states Pal.

According to Charles DiSimone, the more complete "Gilgit Dirghagama manuscripts" recently discovered in 1990s, near the border area of Pakistan and Afghanistan is a Sarvastivadin Buddhist text. This manuscript uses Jains as the chief Anya-tirthikas (followers of another faith) to explain the imperfections in Jainism and the perfection of the Buddha. The text is in Sanskrit with some Prakrit and Buddhist Hybrid Sanskrit, written in proto-Sarada script. It reflects an interpretation – or perhaps more accurately misinterpretation, states DiSimone – of Jainism as preserved by a 7th- and 8th-century Buddhist school in the Central Asian region.
