= Niranjan Das (politician) =

Afghan politician

Niranjan Das was an Afghan Hindu who headed the Department of Taxation in the Emirate of Afghanistan under the premiership of Amanullah Khan (r. 1919 - 1926). (Note: The contemporary British Gazeteer held the post equivalent of the Accountant general.) Carrying the honorary rank of a Civil Colonel, Das commanded over four hundred Mohammadzai and Barakzai officers. In 1919, Khan included him among the ten delegates to represent Afghanistan in the Rawalpindi-Mussourie Peace Conference with the United Kingdom — it was probably the first time a Hindu had political representation in the Afghan Emirate. (Note: Khan is widely hailed as the unsuccessful harbinger of liberalism in Afghanistan. He removed a range of discriminatory practices imposed on non-Muslims, and provided them an equal opportunity in affairs of the state.) After Khan abdicated in the face of a popular rebellion by Saqqawists, Das fled Afghanistan and settled in India.
