= Hindki =

Term used by Pashtuns to denote certain Indian-origin communities

Hindki (Pashto: هندکي) is a term originally used by Pashtuns to denote people or communities of Indian origin that they have been in contact with. More specifically this may include:

- historical Indian communities in Afghanistan, which were formerly active in trade and finance;
- people of Indian origin who have in recent historical times converted to Islam;
- speakers of Hindko.

== See also ==
- Hindkowans
