= Pakistanis in Afghanistan =

Ethnic group

- (Pakistan) (Afghanistan)

Total population
- 221,432 (2015)

Regions with significant populations
- Khost Province, Paktika Province, Nangarhar, Kandahar, Helmand, Ghazni, Wardak, Kabul

Languages
- Pashto, Balochi, Urdu, English

Religion
- Islam

Related ethnic groups
- Overseas Pakistani

Pakistanis in Afghanistan (Urdu: افغانستان میں پاکستانی) are mostly refugees, but also include laborers, traders, businesspersons, and small number of diplomats. Those working in white-collar professions include doctors, engineers, teachers and journalists. Because Pakistan and Afghanistan are neighbouring states with a loosely controlled border, and a distributed population of ethnic Pashtuns and Baloch people, there is constant flow of population between the two countries.

== History ==
Dynasties, such as those of the Delhi Sultanate and the Mughals, as well as nomad people from the Indian subcontinent (including modern-day Pakistan) have been invading and coming to Afghanistan for the past many centuries. Before the mid-19th century, Afghanistan and some regions of Pakistan were part of the Durrani Empire and ruled by a successive line of Pashtun kings who had their capitals in Afghan cities. In 1857, in his review of J.W. Kaye's The Afghan War, Friedrich Engels describes "Afghanistan" as:

[...] an extensive country of Asia [...] between Persia and the Indies, and in the other direction between the Hindu Kush and the Indian Ocean. It formerly included the Persian provinces of Khorassan and Kohistan, together with Herat, Beluchistan, Cashmere, and Sinde, and a considerable part of the Punjab [...] Its principal cities are Kabul, the capital, Ghuznee, Peshawer, and Kandahar.

Thus, interaction and migration between the native people in this region was common. After the Second Anglo-Afghan War, the Durand Line was established in the late 1800s for fixing the limits of sphere of influence between Mortimer Durand of British India and Afghan Amir Abdur Rahman Khan. When Pakistan inherited this single-page agreement in 1947, which was basically to end political interference beyond the frontier line between Afghanistan and what was then colonial British India, it divided the indigenous ethnic Pashtun and Baloch tribes.

During the 1980s Soviet war, a large number of Pakistan-backed Mujahideen forces fought the Soviets and the Soviet-backed Afghan government. After the death of Massoud and the removal of the Taliban regime of Afghanistan in late 2001 by US-led coalition forces, members of the Taliban regrouped and began a strong insurgency campaign inside Afghanistan. The insurgents are members of Afghan-based and Afghan-led militant groups such as the Afghan Taliban (including the Quetta Shura chapter), the Haqqani network, or al-Qaida and others. The militant groups include a small number of Pakistanis and other Muslim foreigners among their ranks.

== Refugees ==
In January 2008, BBC reported that about 6,000 Pakistanis from Khyber Pakhtunkhwa crossed into Afghanistan, which included women and children. While fighting in northwest-Pakistan between the Pakistani Armed Forces and the Pakistani Taliban may have been one reason, Sunni Shia sectarian strife was also suggested as a possible driver for their flight. They were able to receive medical aid in Khost and Paktika provinces. By September 2008, their number had reached 20,000, and about 70% of the refugees were Pakistanis while the rest were Afghans who had settled in Pakistan during the last 20 or so years. More Pakistani refugees went to Afghanistan after the 2010 Pakistan floods. As of 2015, around 221,432 Pakistanis are found living in Afghanistan. Most of them are in Khost Province and Paktika Province. There are also a small number of Pakistani Baloch migrants, mainly concentrated in the southern parts of Afghanistan like Nimruz.

A large number of Pakistani refugees have returned from Afghanistan following the end of Operation Zarb-e-Azb.

== Workers ==
Pakistani expatriates have been involved in the rebuilding and reconstruction of Afghanistan and have made contributions towards the Afghan economy. By 2006, there were about 60,000 Pakistanis working in Afghanistan; the exact number was unclear because of the lack of government records. Pakistanis could be found working not just in the main cities such as Kandahar, but also less-accessible provinces such as Ghazni, Wardak, or Helmand. Many work in the construction sector, while others have found white-collar jobs such as information technology professionals for United Nations organisations and foreign companies in urban areas; they have an increasing demand due to their skills and mostly originate from the northwest Khyber Pakhtunkhwa province. As many as one-sixth cross the border on any given day.

In May 2011, several expatriate Pakistanis crossing the border at Torkham were routinely being harassed and bothered by intelligence agencies in Pakistan; some were asked repetitive questions as to why they were going to Afghanistan while others had their materials and laptops searched. The expatriates sent a complaint and brought the issue to the notice of the Pakistani ambassador in Kabul, Muhammad Sadiq.

== Crime ==
However, NATO and Afghan officials also blame Pakistan's Inter-Services Intelligence (ISI) spy network for being involved in terrorist attacks. Pakistan and Afghanistan have an irregular and poorly marked border. This allows militants to frequently cross back and forth across the border unchecked and undetected. A few of the insurgents and militants in Afghan resistance groups were of Pakistani origin. They have been arrested in the last decade and are held in different prisons across the country. They are usually from regions along the Afghanistan-Pakistan border, including the Waziristan region, the city of Quetta and Khyber Pakhtunkhwa province of Pakistan, and engaged in attacks against US-led NATO forces and the Government of Afghanistan. NATO and Afghan officials also blame Pakistan's Inter-Services Intelligence (ISI) spy network for being involved in some of the attacks. Besides the serious criminals, there are unknown number of Pakistani prisoners in Afghanistan who are held for visa violation or petty crimes.

== See also ==
- Afghans in Pakistan
- Afghanistan–Pakistan relations
- Punjabis in Afghanistan
