= Awtar Singh =

Afghan politician (1966–2018)

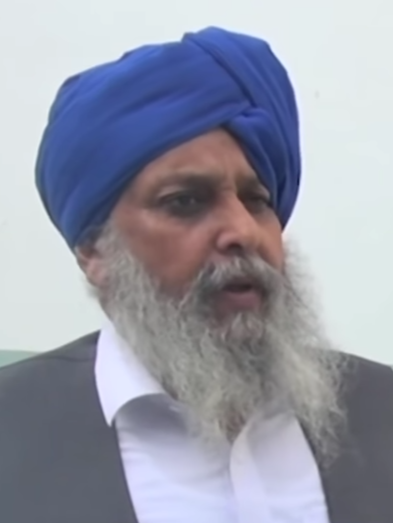
Awtar Singh

Awtar Singh or Awtar Singh Khalsa (1966 – 1 July 2018) was an Afghan politician. He was the Sikh representative to the Loya Jirga from Paktia Province, the only non-Muslim representative there. His native tongue was Punjabi. He was in charge of the main Sikh temple (Gurdwara) in Kabul. Singh was a member of the Mesherano Jirga (upper house) for a five-year term, beginning in 2005.

He had planned to contest the minority seat in the 2018 parliamentary elections. Singh was killed in Jalalabad on 1 July 2018 in a suicide bombing that killed 18 other people, mostly from Afghanistan's Sikh and Hindu minorities. ISIL claimed responsibility for the attack. Singh was 52 and is survived by his wife and 4 children, one of whom was injured in the blast. His son, Narendra Singh Khalsa, contested the minority seat and won. However, he and his family were evacuated from Kabul to India by an Indian Air Force military aircraft just one year later in 2019. They landed at Hindon Air Force Station in Ghaziabad.
