= Hinduism in Afghanistan =

Afghan Hindus افغان هندوان هندوس افغانی
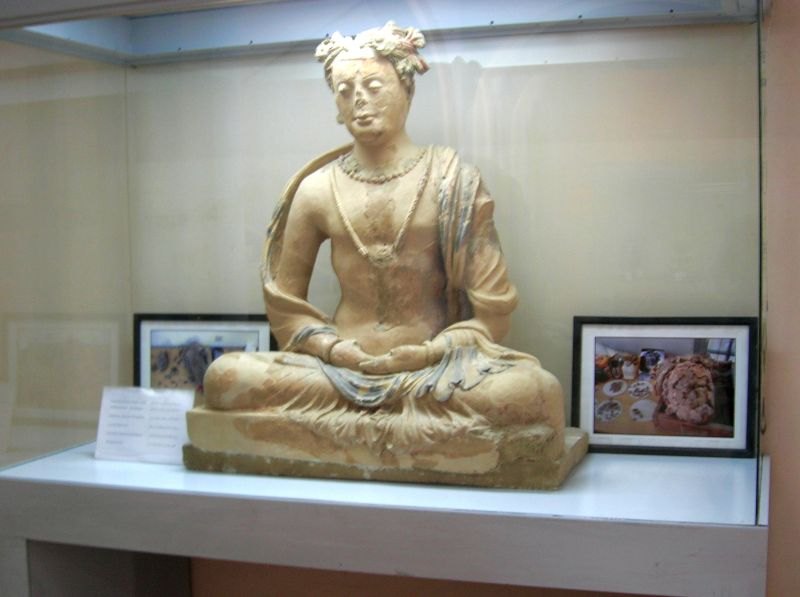
- Hindu king statue in Kabul Museum, Afghanistan

Total population
- 30-40 (2021)

Regions with significant populations
- Larger diaspora in India, Germany, United States, United Kingdom, and Canada

Religions
- Hinduism

Languages
- Dari, Pashto, Hindko, Punjabi, Sindhi, and Hindustani (Urdu-Hindi)

Hinduism in Afghanistan is practiced by a very small minority of Afghans, about 30–40 individuals as of 2021, who live mostly in the cities of Kabul and Jalalabad. Afghan Hindus are ethnically Pashtun, Hindkowan (Hindki), Punjabi, or Sindhi and primarily speak Dari, Pashto, Hindko, Punjabi, Sindhi, and Hindustani (Hindi-Urdu).

Before the Islamic conquest of Afghanistan, the Afghan people were multi-religious. Religious persecution, discrimination, and religious conversions of Hindus in Afghanistan perpetrated by Muslims, has caused the Afghan Hindus, along with Buddhist and Sikh population, to dwindle from Afghanistan.

Prior to the contemporary conflict that began in 1978, Hindus lived across Afghanistan, notably concentrated in major urban centres such as Kabul, Kandahar, Jalalabad, Herat, Mazar-i-Sharif, Kunduz, Ghazni, and Khost. Additionally, significant rural population concentrations in villages traditionally existed in eastern portions of the country as documented by British travelers Jonas Hanway and George Forster in the 18th century, (Note: "In Chapter 7 of the book under review, the author has made reference to accounts of Jonas Hanwey (1712-80), George Forster(1752-91) which show that Hindus and Sikhs were well settled in Afghanistan not only in the main cities but even in small towns and villages.") however, various exoduses and migration to urban regions of the country and eastwards to British India occurred throughout the 19th and 20th centuries as a result of occasional violence and conflict. (Note: "Until 1931 Sikhs and Hindus were settled throughout the villages and small towns of Nangarhar and in the neighbouring Kunar province. That year during an attack by the robbers, two robbers (belonging to Mangal Pashtun tribe) and a Sikh were killed. This meant an ongoing enmity between the Mangal tribe and the Sikhs. To safeguard, the government relocated the Sikhs and Hindus to the bigger towns and cities. Most of them came to Jalalabad which significantly increased their population in the city.") (Note: "The first major exodus of Afghan Hindus (& Sikhs) was during the reign of Amir Abdur Rahman Khan (1880 – 1901). Amir suppressed numerous rebellions including those of Hazaras (a predominately Shia community who are considered as descendants of Mongols due to their facial features) community. Dr Khurana informs that this led to many fundamentalist elements in Afghan society to harass Hindus & Sikhs. Many left the country and settled in India. The Afghan Sikh community in Patiala in Punjab came to India during this time.") (Note: "Mr. Umesh Sharma, 72 years old from Bengaluru informs that his great grandfather Pandit Guru Dass moved out of Herat in 1888 when the local Muslims boycotted Hindu (& Sikh) shops. The family came to Gujranwala then to Lahore and finally settled in Meerut in 1943. Mr. Sharma adds that 90% of Hindus & Sikhs left Herat, out of which 30% settled in other parts of Afghanistan and rest migrated to British controlled India.") (Note: "Amir Amanullah Khan’s (reign 1919 – 29) modernization plan which included education for women, wearing modern clothing etc. led to a strong resentment and there was a rebellion in Khost province in 1924 which was quelled in January 1925. The Amir came from long tour of Europe in 1928 and announced that he was banning hijab & burka. Although there were other factors, but the Amir was declared as ‘kuffar’(infidel) and large number of tribes in Eastern (& Kandahar) Afghanistan rebelled against the government. This Afghan Civil started in November 1928 and ended in October 1929. This civil war affected Eastern Afghanistan including Kabul and Kandahar which traditionally had relatively high Hindu and Sikh population who were again at the receiving end of the fundamentalist element. This again led to some migration of Afghan Hindus & Sikhs to British India.")

According to the European Union Agency for Asylum (EUAA), the number of Hindus in Afghanistan has steadily declined over the past few decades. During the mid 20th century, in the 1970s, approximately 280,000 Hindus lived in Afghanistan; (Note: Combined Hindu and Sikh population cited at 700,000. Hindu population based on population ratio estimates between Afghan Hindus and Sikhs being 40:60, as cited per historian Inderjeet Singh.) by 1992, prior to the fall of the government, the population was approximately 88,000, (Note: Combined Hindu and Sikh population cited at 220,000. Hindu population based on population ratio estimates between Afghan Hindus and Sikhs being 40:60, as cited per historian Inderjeet Singh.) while by the start of 2021 roughly 160 Hindus remained, (Note: Combined Hindu and Sikh population cited at 400. Hindu population based on population ratio estimates between Afghan Hindus and Sikhs being 40:60, as cited per historian Inderjeet Singh.) and by the end of the same year, the population reportedly declined below 50 persons.

== Background ==
Apart from the Hindkowans, the Indo-Aryan native inhabitants of the region, including Pashayi and Nuristanis, were also known to be practising what authors consider as a form of Indo-Iranian (Vedic- or Hindu-like) religion. (Note: See Kalash people, Note on Indo-Iranian religion.) Pashtuns, the majority ethnic group in Afghanistan (officially, no ethnic census ever made), have a component of Vedic ancestors from the Pakthas.

"The Pakthas, Bhalanases, Vishanins, Alinas, and Sivas were the five frontier tribes. The Pakthas lived in the hills from which the Kruma originates. Zimmer locates them in present-day eastern Afghanistan, identifying them with the modern Pakthun."

Gandhara, a region encompassing the southeast of Afghanistan, was influenced by Vedism since the post-Vedic period (c. 1500 – c. 1200 BCE), and later became an important centre of Buddhism. Later forms of Hinduism were also prevalent in this southeastern region of the country during the Turk Shahis, with Khair Khaneh, a Brahmanical temple being excavated in Kabul and a statue of Gardez Ganesha being found in Paktia province. Most of the remains, including marble statuettes, date to the 7th–8th century, during the time of the Turk Shahi. The statue of Ganesha from Gardez is now attributed to the period of Turk Shahis in the 7-8th century CE, rather than to their successors the Hindu Shahis (9th-10th century) as has also been suggested. The dating is essentially based on stylistic analysis, as the statue displays great iconographical and stylistic similarities with the works of the Buddhist monastery of Fondukistan, which is also dated to the same period. Hinduism further flourished under the rule of Hindu Shahis, but went into sharp decline with the advent of Islam through the Ghaznavids, who defeated the Shahis. Nonetheless, it continued as a significant minority in Afghanistan until the 21st century, when its number of followers fell to a few hundred.

== History ==
=== Prehistory and ancient period (3300–550 BCE) ===
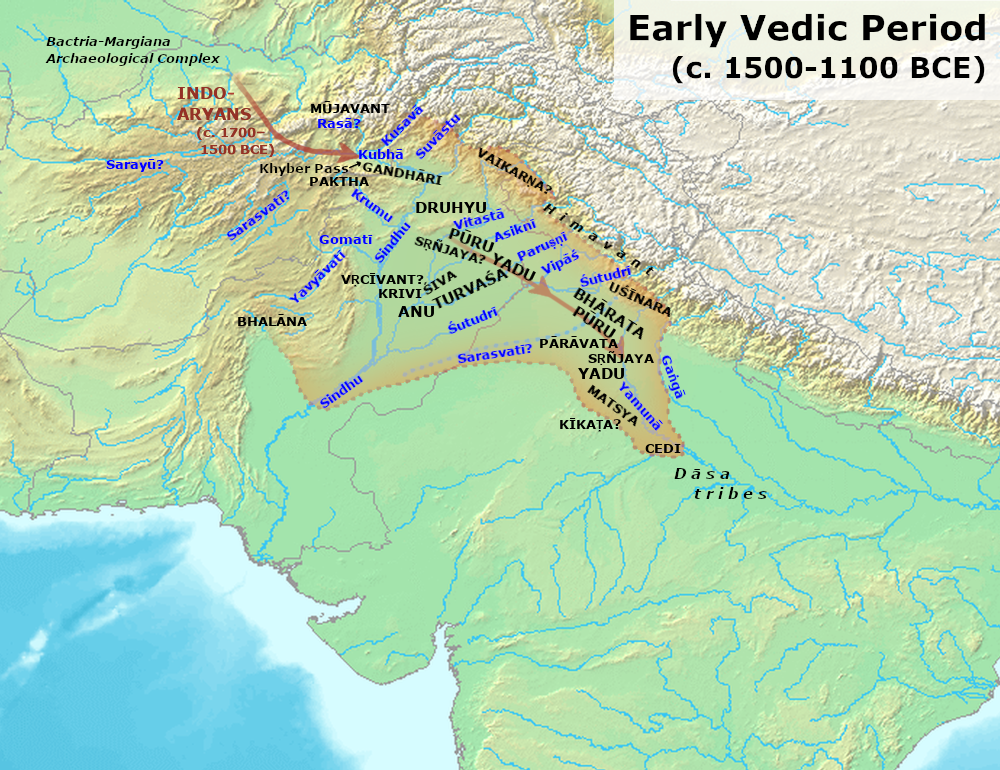
Vedic tribes in northwestern ancient India (present-day Afghanistan), 1700–1100 BCE

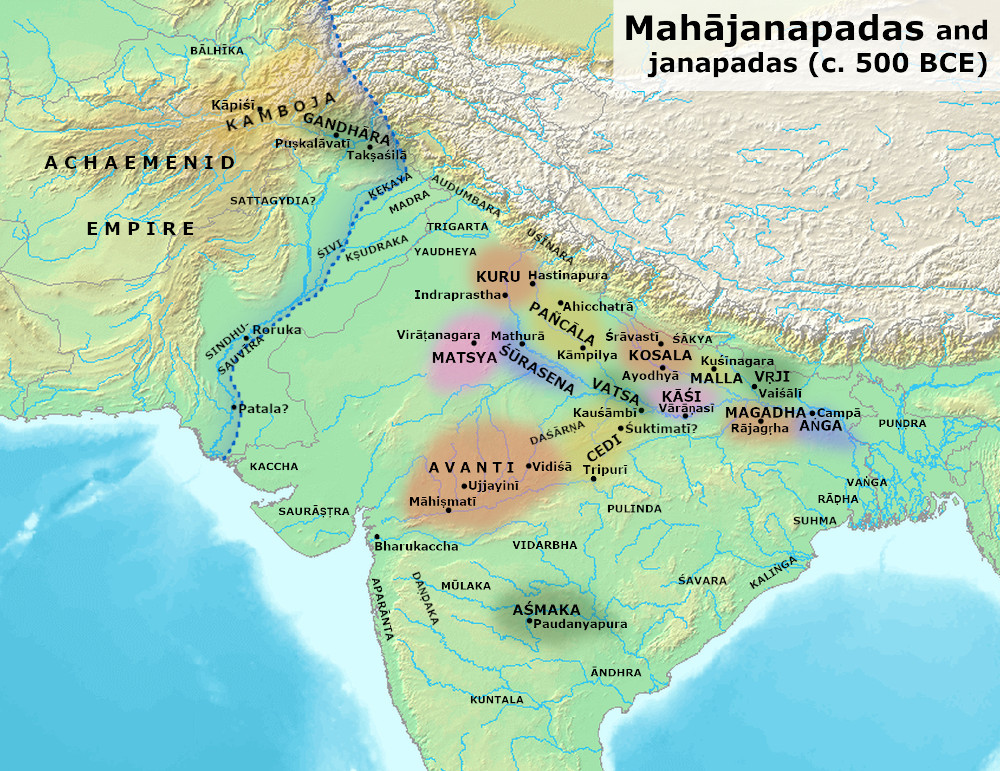
The Mahajanapadas, including the Gandhara and Kamboja regions c. 500 – c. BCE

By roughly 2000–1500 BCE, Indo-Aryan inhabitants of the region (mainly in the eastern parts of present-day Afghanistan) were adherents of an ancient form of Indo-Iranian religion. Notable among these were the Gandharis and Kambojas. The Pashayi and Nuristanis are present day examples of these Indo-Aryan Vedic people.

=== Persian, Greek, and Mauryan periods (550–150 BCE) ===
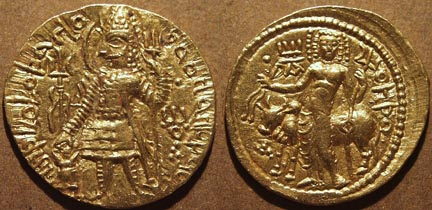
Gold dinar of Kanishka II, emperor of the Kushan Empire, with Lord Shiva (200–220 CE)

Most historians maintain that Afghanistan was inhabited by ancient Arians followed by the Achaemenids before the arrival of Alexander the Great and his Greek army in 330 BC. It became part of the Seleucid Empire after the departure of Alexander three years later. In 305 BCE, the Seleucid Empire lost control of the territory south of the Hindu Kush to the Indian Emperor "Sandrocottus" as a result of the Seleucid-Mauryan War.

Alexander took these away from the Arians and established settlements of his own, but Seleucus Nicator gave them to Sandrocottus (Chandragupta), upon terms of intermarriage and of receiving in exchange 500 elephants.

— Strabo, 64 BCE–24 CE

=== Classical period (150 BCE–650 CE) ===
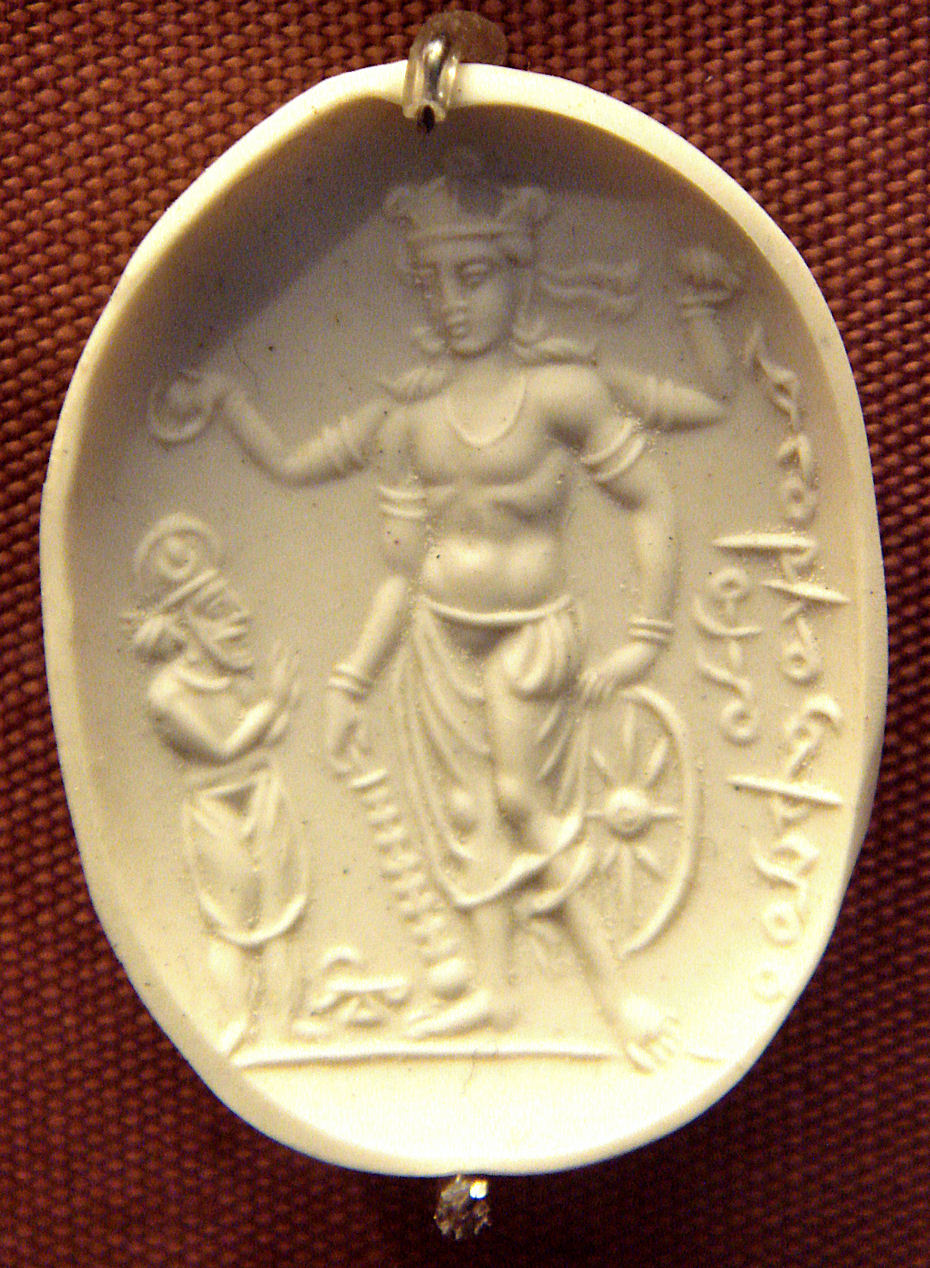
Vishnu Nicolo Seal representing Vishnu with a worshipper (probably Mihirakula), 4th–6th century CE. The inscription in cursive Bactrian reads: "Mihira, Yajna and Oesho". British Museum.

When Chinese travellers Faxian, Song Yun, and Xuanzang explored Afghanistan between the 5th and 7th centuries CE, they wrote numerous travelogues in which reliable information on Afghanistan was stored. They stated that Buddhism was practiced in different parts between the Amu Darya (Oxus River) in the north and the Indus River. However, they did not mention much about Hinduism although Song Yun did state that the Hephthalite rulers did not recognize Buddhism but "preached pseudo gods and killed animals for their meat".

=== Turk and Kabul Shahi, Zunbil dynasty (650–850 CE) ===
Before the Islamic conquest of Afghanistan, the territory was a religious sediment of Zoroastrianism, Zunbils, Hinduism and Buddhism. It was inhabited by various peoples, including Persians, Khalaj, Turks, and Pashtuns. Parts of the territory South of Hindu Kush were ruled by the Zunbils, offspring of the southern-Hephthalite. The eastern parts (Kabulistan) were controlled by the Turk Shahis.

The Zunbil and Kabul Shahis were connected with the Indian subcontinent through Buddhism and Zun religions. The Zunbil kings worshipped a sun god by the name of Zun, from which they derived their name. André Wink writes that "the cult of Zun was primarily Hindu, not Buddhist or Zoroastrian", nonetheless he still mentions them having parallels with Tibetan Buddhism and Zoroastrianism in their rituals.

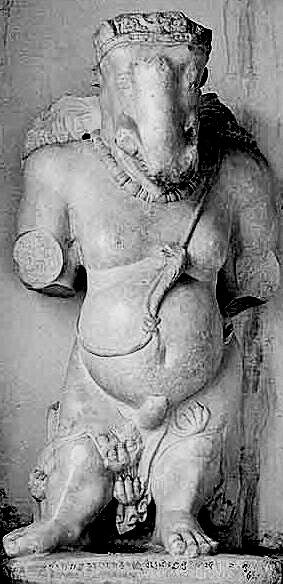
A 5th-century marble Ganesha found in Gardez, Afghanistan, now at Dargah Pir Rattan Nath, Kabul. The inscription says that this "great and beautiful image of Mahāvināyaka" was consecrated by the Hindu Shahi King "Khingala".

The Kabul Shahi ruled north of the Zunbil territory, which included Kabulistan and Gandahara. The Arabs reached Kabul in 653–654 CE when Abdur Rahman bin Samara, along with 6,000 Arab Muslims, penetrated the Zunbil territory and made their way to the shrine of Zun in Zamindawar, which was believed to be located about five kilometres (three miles) south of Musa Qala in today's Helmand Province of Afghanistan. The General of the Arab army "broke of a hand of the idol and plucked out the rubies which were its eyes in order to persuade the Marzbān of Sīstān of the god's worthlessness."

Though the early Arab invaders spread the message of Islam, they were not able to rule for long. Hence, many contemporary ethnic groups in Afghanistan, including the Pashtuns, Kalash, Pashayi, Nuristanis and Hindkowans continued to practice Hinduism, Buddhism, and Zoroastrianism. The Kabul Shahis decided to build a giant wall around the city to prevent more Arab invasions; this wall still stands today.

=== Hindu Shahi (850–1000 CE) ===
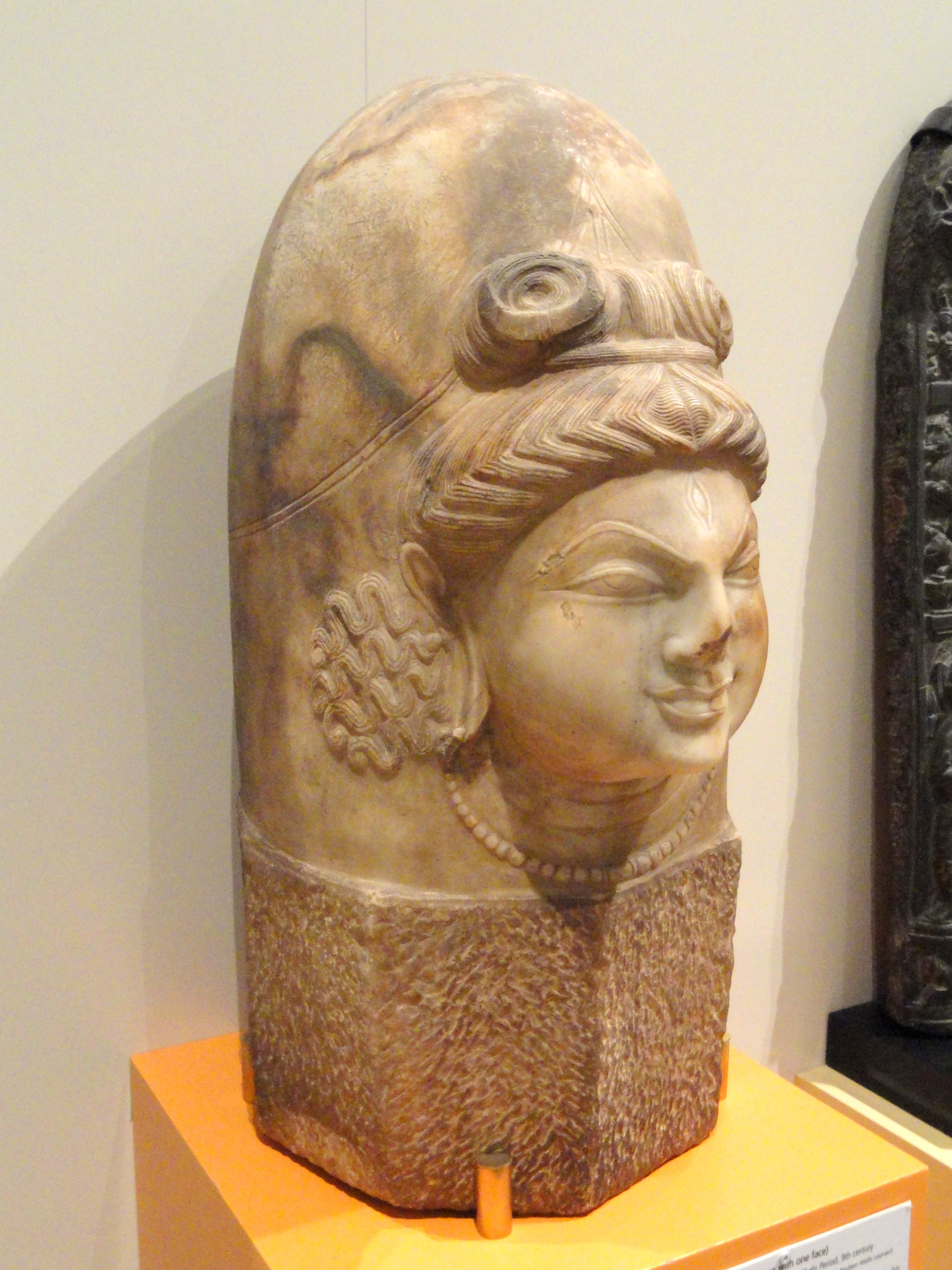
Ekamukhalinga (Shivalinga with one face), Shahi Period, 9th century. Royal Ontario Museum, Toronto.

Willem Vogelsang in his 2002 book writes: "During the 8th and 9th centuries AD the eastern territories of modern Afghanistan were still in the hands of non-Muslim rulers. The Muslims primarily regarded them as Indians (Hindus), although many of the local rulers and people were apparently of Hunnic or Turkic descent. Yet, the Muslims were right in so far as the non-Muslim population of eastern Afghanistan was, culturally linked to the Indian sub-continent. Most of them were either Hindus or Buddhists. "

In 870 AD the Saffarids from medieval Zaranj, located at the Nad-e Ali site of modern-day Iran (not to be confused with the similarly named modern city of Zaranj in Afghanistan), conquered most of Afghanistan, establishing Muslim governors throughout the land. It is reported that Muslims and non-Muslims still lived side by side before the arrival of the Ghaznavids in the 10th century.

"Kábul has a castle celebrated for its strength, accessible only by one road. In it there are Musulmáns, and it has a town, in which are infidels from Hind."

— Istahkrí, 921 AD

The first confirmed mention of a Hindu in Afghanistan appears in the 982 AD Ḥudūd al-ʿĀlam, where it speaks of a king in "Ninhar" (Nangarhar), who shows a public display of conversion to Islam, even though he had over 30 wives, which are described as "Muslim, Afghan, and Hindu" wives. These names were often used as geographical terms. For example, Hindu (or Hindustani) has been historically used as a geographical term to describe someone who was native from the region known as Hindustan (Indian subcontinent), and Afghan as someone who was native from a region called Afghanistan.

=== Decline (1000–1800 CE) ===
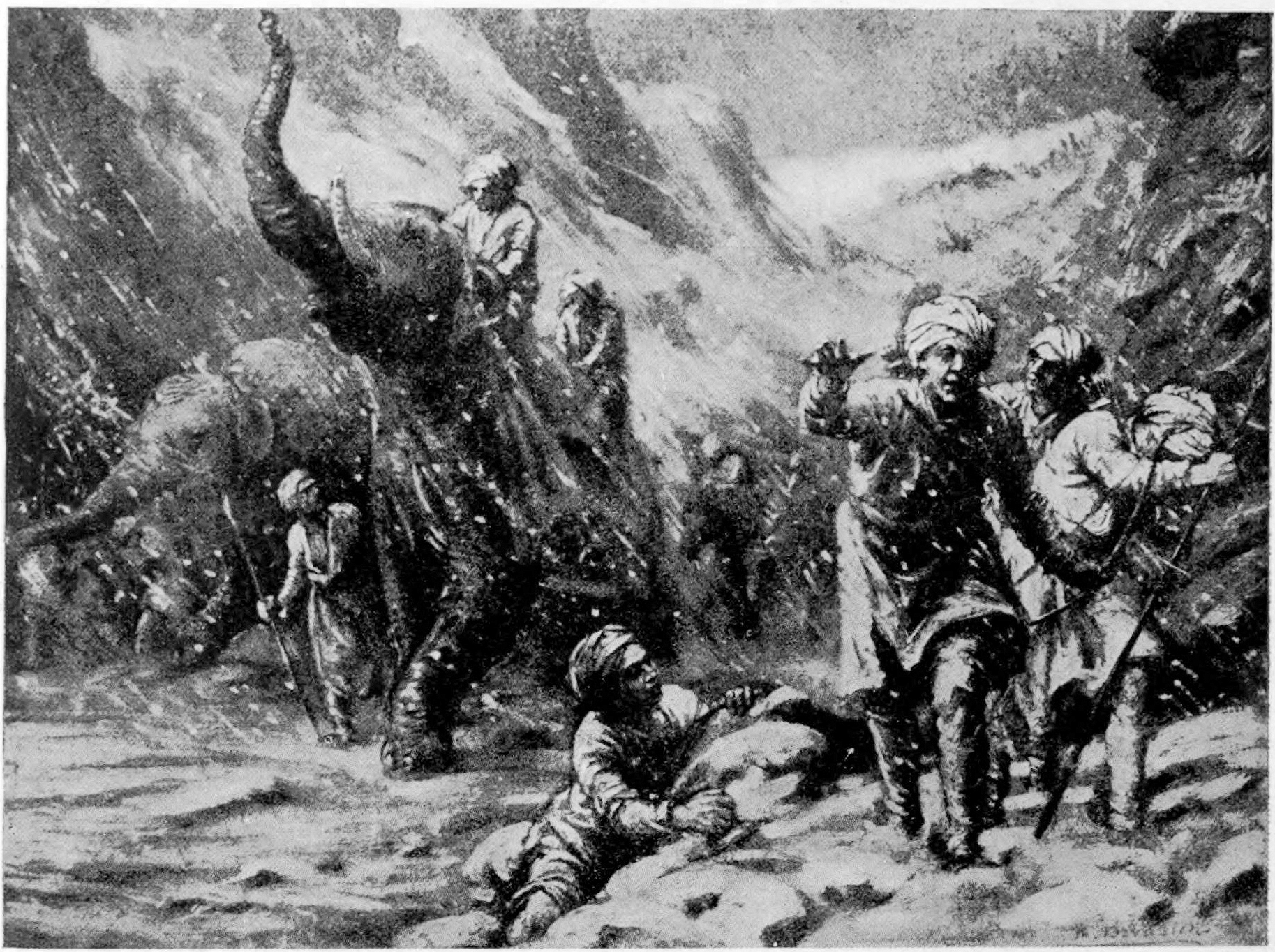
Defeat of the Hindu Shahis, led by Jayapala against the Ghaznavid Empire, led by Mahmud of Ghazni in 1001 CE.

When Sultan Mahmud of Ghazni began crossing the Indus River into Hindustan (land of Hindus) in the 10th century, the Ghaznavid Muslims began bringing Hindu slaves to what is now Afghanistan. Martin Ewans in his 2002 book writes:

Even then a Hindu dynasty the Hindu Shahis, held Gandhara and the eastern borders. From the tenth century onwards as Persian language and culture continued to spread into Afghanistan, the focus of power shifted to Ghazni, where a Turkic dynasty, who started by ruling the town for the Samanid dynasty of Bokhara, proceeded to create an empire in their own right. The greatest of the Ghaznavids was Mahmud who ruled between 998 and 1030. He expelled the Hindus from Ghandhara, made no fewer than 17 raids into India. He encouraged mass conversions to Islam, in Pakistan as well as in Afghanistan."

Al-Idirisi testifies that until as late as the 12th century, a contract of investiture for every Shahi king was performed at Kabul and that here he was obliged to agree to certain ancient conditions which completed the contract. The Ghaznavid military incursions assured the domination of Sunni Islam in what is now Afghanistan and Pakistan. Various historical sources such as Martin Ewans, E.J. Brill and Farishta have recorded the introduction of Islam to Kabul and other parts of Afghanistan to the conquests of and Mahmud:

The Arabs advanced through Sistan and conquered Sindh early in the eighth century. Elsewhere however their incursions were no more than temporary, and it was not until the rise of the Saffarid dynasty in the ninth century that the frontiers of Islam effectively reached Ghazni and Kabul. Even then a Hindu dynasty the Hindushahis, held Gandhara and eastern borders. From the tenth century onwards as Persian language and culture continued to spread into Afghanistan, the focus of power shifted to Ghazni, where a Turkish dynasty, who started by ruling the town for the Samanid dynasty of Bokhara, proceeded to create an empire in their own right. The greatest of the Ghaznavids was Muhmad who ruled between 998 and 1030. He expelled the Hindus from Gandhara, made no fewer than seventeen raids into northwestern India and succeeded in conquering territory stretching from the Caspian Sea to Varanasi. Bokhara and Samarkand also came under his rule. He encouraged mass conversions to Islam, of Indians as well as Afghans, looted Hindu temples and carried off immense booty, earning for himself, depending on the viewpoint of the observer, the titles of 'Image-breaker' or 'scourge of India'.

Mahmud used his plundered wealth to finance his armies which included mercenaries. The Indian soldiers, presumably Hindus, who were one of the components of the army with their commander called sipahsalar-i-Hinduwan lived in their quarter of Ghazna practicing their own religion. Indian soldiers under their commander Suvendhray remained loyal to Mahmud. They were also used against a Turkic rebel, with the command given to a Hindu named Tilak according to Baihaki.

In his war on Peshawar and Waihind says al-Utbi, Mahmud acquired 500,000 slaves that included children and girls. Men were sold as slaves to even common merchants. The amount of slaves captured in Nardin plummeted their price and male slaves were even bought by common merchants. After raiding Thanesar, he acquired 200,000 slaves.

The renowned 14th-century Moroccan Muslim scholar Ibn Battuta remarked that the Hindu Kush meant the "slayer of Indians", because slaves brought from India who had to pass through there died in large numbers due to the extreme cold and quantity of snow.

The Ghaznavid Empire was further expanded by the Ghurids. During the Khalji dynasty, there was also free movement between people from India and Afghanistan. It continued this way until the Mughals followed by the Suris and the Durranis.

During the 18th century (1700s), Afghanistan was still home to a significant Hindu population as documented by British travellers Jonas Hanway (1712–80) and George Forster (1752-91). As noted by the travellers, the Hindu population had a dispersed geographic distribution across the country, with concentrations existing throughout both rural and urban regions.

=== Modern period ===
During the 19th and 20th centuries, due to waves of violence and conflict, various migration waves eastwards to British India, coupled with similar out-migration from rural regions of the country resulted in increased urbanization of the Hindu population of Afghanistan. This was especially noted in eastern regions of the country such as Nangarhar Province and Kunar Province where significant rural Hindu populations existed at the time. One such incident took place in 1931 when an attack by robbers—two of whom belonged to the Mangal Pashtun tribe—led to the deaths of two robbers and a Sikh, sparking ongoing enmity between the Mangal tribe and the Sikhs. In response, the government relocated Sikhs and Hindus to larger towns and cities for their safety, with most settling in Jalalabad, significantly increasing the city's population.

The main ethnic groups in Afghanistan which practice Hinduism today are the Punjabis and Sindhis who are believed to have come along with Sikhs as merchants to Afghanistan in the 19th century. Until the collapse of the Democratic Republic of Afghanistan, there were several thousand Hindus living in the country but today their number is at under 100. Most of the others immigrated to India, the European Union, North America or elsewhere.

Afghan Hindus and Afghan Sikhs often share places of worship. Along with the Sikhs, they are all collectively known as Hindki. Linguistic demographics among the Hindu community are diverse and generally follow regional origins: those hailing from Punjab generally speak Punjabi, Sindhis speak Sindhi, and the northern and southern dialects of Hindko. The local Hindu community in Afghanistan is mostly based in the city of Kabul. The 2002 loya jirga had two seats reserved for Hindus and former President Hamid Karzai's economic advisor, Sham Lal Bhatija was an Afghan Hindu.

During the Taliban 1996 to late 2001 rule, Hindus were forced to wear yellow badges in public to identify themselves as non-Muslims. Hindu women were forced to wear burqas, a measure which was claimed to "protect" them from harassment. This was part of the Taliban's plan to segregate "un-Islamic" and "idolatrous" communities from Islamic ones.

The decree was condemned by the Indian and U.S. governments as a violation of religious freedom. Widespread protests against the Taliban regime broke out in Bhopal, India. In the United States, Abraham Foxman, chairman of the Anti-Defamation League, compared the decree to the practices of Nazi Germany, where Jews were required to wear labels identifying them as such. Several influential lawmakers in the United States wore yellow badges with the inscription "I am a Hindu", on the floor of the Senate during the debate as a demonstration of their solidarity with the Hindu minority in Afghanistan.

Since the 1990s, many Afghan Hindus have fled the country, seeking asylum in countries such as India, Germany and United States.

In July 2013, the Afghan parliament refused to reserve seats for the minority group as a bill reserving seats for the mentioned was voted against. The bill by the then president Hamid Karzai, had tribal people and "women" as "vulnerable groups" who got reservation, but not religious minorities as per the religious equality article in the constitution.

== Demographics ==
Historical Population
| Year | Pop. | ±% |
|---|---|---|
| 1980 | 180,000 | — |
| 2005 | 79,521 | −55.8% |
| 2010 | 10,700 | −86.5% |
| 2020 | 50 | −99.5% |
Source: (Note: As both populations are frequently merged in historic and contemporary estimations, the population ratio between Afghan Sikhs and Hindus is estimated to be 60:40 according to historian Inderjeet Singh. The 1980 estimate is derived from this population ratio, using the average of the estimated population range of 80,000 to 280,000 from the era, taken from the preceding source, along with the three following sources.)

| Year | Percent | Increase |
|---|---|---|
| 1980 | 1.6% | |
| 2005 | 0.35% | -1.25% |
| 2010 | 0.04% | -0.31 |
| 2020 | 0.04% | - |

Population history estimates of Afghan Hindus
| Year | Hindu population & percentage | | Total population of Afghanistan | Sources |
| Year | Total Hindu population of Afghanistan | Hindu percentage of total population of Afghanistan | Total population of Afghanistan | Sources |
|---|---|---|---|---|
| 1940 | 100,000 | 1.43% | 7,000,000 | |
| 1970 | 280,000 | 2.59% | 10,800,000 | |
| 1970 | 80,000 | 0.74% | 10,800,000 | |
| 1970 | 40,000 | 0.37% | 10,800,000 | |
| 1973 | 12,000 | 0.11% | 11,300,000 | |
| 1978 | 100,000 | 0.78% | 12,900,000 | |
| 1979 | 40,000 | 0.31% | 13,000,000 | |
| 1980 | 200,000 | 1.6% | 12,500,000 | |
| 1980 | 120,000 | 0.96% | 12,500,000 | |
| 1980 | 100,000 | 0.8% | 12,500,000 | |
| 1980 | 88,000 | 0.7% | 12,500,000 | |
| 1980 | 80,000 | 0.64% | 12,500,000 | |
| 1980 | 50,000 | 0.4% | 12,500,000 | |
| 1980 | 40,000 | 0.32% | 12,500,000 | |
| 1989 | 20,000 | 0.19% | 10,700,000 | |
| 1990 | 80,000 | 0.75% | 10,700,000 | |
| 1990 | 40,000 | 0.37% | 10,700,000 | |
| 1990 | 20,000 | 0.19% | 10,700,000 | |
| 1992 | 88,000 | 0.73% | 12,100,000 | |
| 1992 | 80,000 | 0.66% | 12,100,000 | |
| 1992 | 30,000 | 0.25% | 12,100,000 | |
| 1992 | 24,000 | 0.2% | 12,100,000 | |
| 1992 | 20,000 | 0.17% | 12,100,000 | |
| 1994 | 24,000 | 0.15% | 15,500,000 | |
| 1995 | 6,000 | 0.04% | 16,400,000 | |
| 1996 | 4,000 | 0.02% | 17,100,000 | |
| 2001 | 1,200 | 0.01% | 19,700,000 | |
| 2009 | 3,000 | 0.01% | 27,400,000 | |
| 2009 | 1,100 | 0.004% | 27,400,000 | |
| 2010 | 800 | 0.003% | 28,200,000 | |
| 2017 | 2,800 | 0.01% | 35,600,000 | |
| 2017 | 1,200 | 0.01% | 35,600,000 | |
| 2017 | 540 | 0.002% | 35,600,000 | |
| 2017 | 520 | 0.001% | 35,600,000 | |
| 2018 | 800 | 0.002% | 36,700,000 | |
| 2018 | 280 | 0.001% | 36,700,000 | |
| 2018 | 60 | 0.0002% | 36,700,000 | |
| 2019 | 440 | 0.001% | 37,800,000 | |
| 2019 | 400 | 0.001% | 37,800,000 | |
| 2019 | 220 | 0.001% | 37,800,000 | |
| 2019 | 35 | 0.0001% | 37,800,000 | |
| 2020 | 540 | 0.001% | 39,000,000 | |
| 2020 | 280 | 0.001% | 39,000,000 | |
| 2020 | 160 | 0.0004% | 39,000,000 | |
| 2020 | 50 | 0.0001% | 39,000,000 | |
| 2021 | 400 | 0.001% | 40,100,000 | |
| 2021 | 100 | 0.0002% | 40,100,000 | |
| 2021 | 40 | 0.0001% | 40,100,000 | |
| 2022 | 400 | 0.001% | 41,100,000 | |
| 2022 | 60 | 0.0001% | 41,100,000 | |
Note: Historical and contemporary estimations frequently merge Afghan Hindu and Afghan Sikh populations. According to historian Inderjeet Singh, the population ratio between Afghan Hindus and Sikhs is estimated to be 40:60. All sourced estimates in table above with merged population figures are based upon this population ratio.

== Diaspora ==
Afghan Hindu Diaspora
Total population
- 80,000 - 280,000 (c. 1980)

Regions with significant populations
- India, Germany, United Kingdom, United States, Canada, Australia
- India: 15,000-16,000
- Germany: 7,000-10,000
- United States: 3,000
- United Kingdom: 1,600

Languages
- Hindko (native), English, Hindi, Punjabi, Pashto (older generation), Dari (older generation)

As both populations are frequently merged in historic and contemporary estimations, the population ratio between Afghan Sikhs and Hindus is estimated to be 60:40 according to historian Inderjeet Singh. (Note: “According to Singh, there were at least 2 lakh Sikhs and Hindus (in a 60:40 ratio) in Afghanistan until the 1970s.”)

With a wide range of population approximations in the absence of official census data and with much of the community concentrated in the provinces of Kabul, Nangarhar, Ghazni, and Kandahar, the Afghan Hindu population was estimated to be between 80,000 and 280,000 in the 1970s, (Note: “In the 70s, there were around 700,000 Hindus and Sikhs, and now they are estimated to be less than 7,000,” Shayegan says.) (Note: “An investigation by TOLOnews reveals that the Sikh and Hindu population number was 220,000 in the 1980's.”) as per estimates by historian Inderjeet Singh, Ehsan Shayegan with the Porsesh Research and Studies Organisation and Rawail Singh, an Afghan Sikh civil rights activist.

In the time of 1980's after the Afghan civil war 1979 the population of Hindus and Sikh fell at a very fast rate due to Taliban's rise to power and religious persecution and discrimination and they migrated from Afghanistan to other countries, The continue rise of Islamization and Taliban insurgency also contributed in the diaspora. The decline was seen mostly in Pashtuns-dominated areas, due to Pashtunistan and Pashtun nationalism, with the Afghan Hindu population declining to 3,000 by 2009.

As per the 2017 data, more than 99% of Afghan Sikhs and Hindus have left the country in the last 3 decades. Many Afghan Hindus and Sikhs have been settled in Germany, France, United States, Australia, India, Belgium, the Netherlands and other nations.

The Afghan Hindu population declined to approximately 50 in 2020. Later, following the Fall of Kabul in 2021, the Government of India evacuated many Sikhs and Hindus out of the country due to the Taliban takeover. As a result, only one Hindu priest remains in the nation today, also acting as Temple guard.

== Ancient Hindu temples ==
| Place | Description | Other information | Ref. |
|---|---|---|---|
| Polusha | Bhima Devi (Durga) and temple of Maheshvera | Visited by Xuanzang | |
| Sakawand | Temple dedicated to Surya | | |
| Asamai Temple | The Asamai temple is at the foothills of the central Kabul hill Koh-e Asamai | | |
| Bhairo Temple | Shor Bazaar | | |
| Mangaldwar Mandir | Shor Bazaar | | |

== Notable people ==
- Atma Ram – Afghan Minister and author
- Niranjan Das - Afghan politician
- Annet Mahendru – American actress born in Kabul to a Punjabi Indian father, Ghanshan "Ken" Mahendru, whose family had emigrated to Afghanistan from Delhi and a Russian mother, Olga.
- Celina Jaitley – Indian Bollywood actress born to an Indian Punjabi father in the Army and a Christian mother, Meeta. Her mother was a third-generation Afghan-Indian through her Afghan Hindu great-grandmother.

== See also ==
- Hinduism by country
- Religion in Afghanistan
- Jainism in Afghanistan
- Sikhism in Afghanistan
- Buddhism in Afghanistan
- Pre-Islamic Hindu and Buddhist heritage of Afghanistan
- Khatri
- Punjabis in Afghanistan
- Hindkowan
- Kalash people
- Burusho people
- Kafiristan
- Hindu Kush

== Sources ==
- Brown, Robert (1991), Ganesh: Studies of an Asian God, Albany: State University of New York, ISBN 978-0791406571
- Hutter, Manfred (2018). "Afghanistan". In Basu, Helene; Jacobsen, Knut A.; Malinar, Angelika; Narayanan, Vasudha (eds.). Brill's Encyclopedia of Hinduism. Vol. 1. Leiden: Brill Publishers. doi:10.1163/2212-5019_BEH_COM_9000000190. ISBN 978-90-04-17641-6. ISSN 2212-5019.
- Dhavalikar, M. K. (1991). "Gaņeśa: Myth and Reality". In Brown, Robert L. (ed.). Ganesh: Studies of an Asian God. SUNY Series in Tantric Studies. Albany, New York: SUNY Press. pp. 49–68. ISBN 978-0-7914-0656-4. OCLC 42855045.
- Tate, George Passman (1911). The Kingdom of Afghanistan. Asian Education Services. pp. 201–224. ISBN 9-788-120-61586-1.
- "Inscription throws new light to Hindu rule in Afghanistan". Indian Express. 5 January 2000. Archived from the original on 4 January 2006.
