= Jai Singh Fani =

First Sikh elected to the Parliament in Afghanistan

Sardar Jai Singh Fani (1941–1977) was the first Sikh to be elected to the Parliament in Afghanistan. He won a seat in the 1969 parliamentary election.
