= Irreligion in Afghanistan =

According to a study by Humanists International (HI), Afghanistan is one of the seven countries in the world (the other six being Iran, the Maldives, Mauritania, Pakistan, Saudi Arabia and Sudan) where being an atheist or a convert can lead to a death sentence. According to the 2012 WIN-Gallup Global Index of Religion and Atheism report, Afghanistan ranks among the countries where people are least likely to admit to being an atheist.

== Legal aspects ==
=== Criminal law ===
Since apostasy is a crime under the sharia of Afghanistan, apostates are not seen kindly. Apostates, including atheists, are considered safe if they were brought up as Muslim and do not make their beliefs (or lack thereof) public. Apostates are usually disowned by their families. Apostasy and conversion from Islam carry death sentences in Afghanistan's Islamic legal system. Mob lynchings have also been known to happen.

=== Asylum ===
In January 2014, an Afghan man living in the UK since 2007 was granted asylum under the 1951 Refugee Convention. The man's legal team argued that he may face a death sentence if he returned. He had come to the UK with his family when he was 16, and had become an atheist while living there.

== See also ==
- Religion in Afghanistan
- Freedom of religion in Afghanistan
- Islam in Afghanistan
- Christianity in Afghanistan
- Demographics of Afghanistan
