= Demographics of Afghanistan =

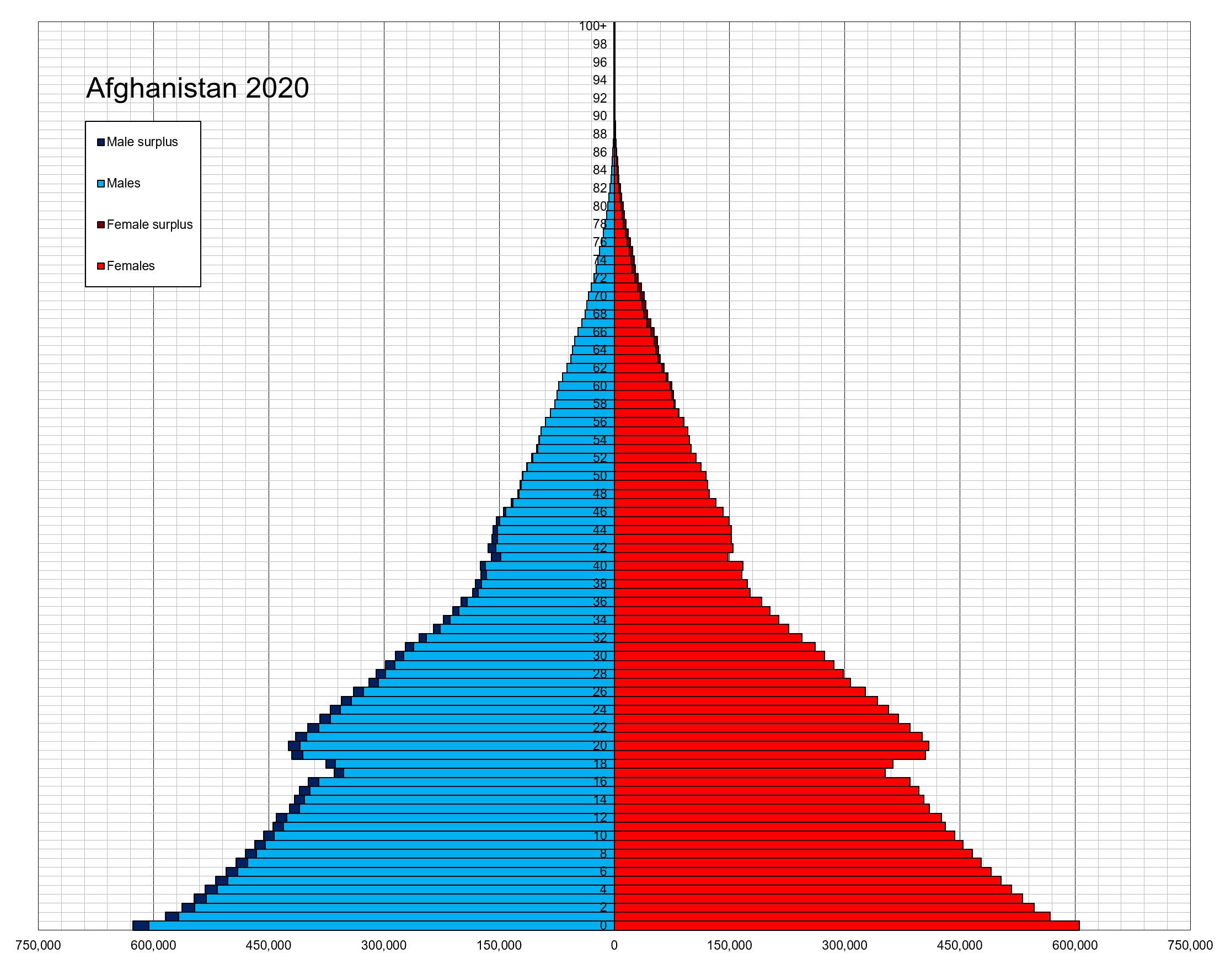
- Afghanistan population pyramid in 2020
- Population: ▲41,454,761 (2023)
- Growth rate: ▲ +2.85% (2023)
- Birth rate: 35.44/1000 (2023)
- Death rate: 5.80/1000 (2023)
- Life expectancy: ▼59.1 years at birth (2021)
- Fertility rate: 4.84 children per woman (2023)
- Infant mortality: ▼44.0/1000 (2023)
- Immigrant share: 0.2% (2024)

Nationality
- Nationality: Afghan
- Major ethnic: Iranians; Pashtuns; Tajiks; Aimaqs; Balochs; Pamiris; Wakhis; Others; Qizilbash; Others
- Minor ethnic: Turkics; Uzbeks; Turkmens; Hazaras; Kyrgyz; Others; Dravidians; Brahuis; Others; Pashayis; Nuristanis; Gujjars; Arabs; Sayyid/Sadat; Other groups

Population, fertility rate and net reproduction rate, United Nations estimates

As of 2025, Afghanistan has an estimated population of around 49.5 million people. The country is characterized by a highly diverse, multi-ethnic, and multilingual society, reflecting its historical position at the crossroads of Central, South, and Western Asia, along ancient trade and invasion routes. The four major ethnic categories in the country are Pashtun, Tajik/Farsiwan, Hazara, and Uzbek. In addition, Afghanistan has a plethora of minor ethnic categories, including Pashayi, Nuristani, Sikh, Hindkowan, Turkmen, Kyrgyz, Baloch, Aimaq, Qizilbash, Arab and many others.

Approximately 43% of the population was under the age of 15, and about 74% of Afghans lived in rural areas as of 2016. The country has one of the highest fertility rates in the world outside of Africa, with the average woman giving birth to five children over her lifetime. Around 6.8% of infants die during childbirth or early infancy. According to the World Health Organization (WHO), the nation's average life expectancy was estimated at about 63 years as of 2019. The prevalence of HIV remains very low, affecting only about 0.04% of the population.

Pashto (پښتو) and Dari (دری) are the official languages of Afghanistan. Dari serves as the inter-ethnic lingua franca across most of the country, particularly in northern and eastern provinces as well as in most major cities. Pashto is predominantly spoken in regions south of the Hindu Kush mountains and extends eastward toward the Indus River in neighbouring Pakistan. Smaller languages such as Uzbek and Turkmen are spoken in parts of northern Afghanistan. Multilingualism is widespread, particularly in the major urban centres.

Up to 89.7% of the population adheres to Sunni Islam and follows the Hanafi school of Islamic jurisprudence, while between 10% and 15% are followers of Shia Islam, with the majority belonging to the Twelver branch, and smaller communities adhering to Ismaili traditions. The remaining 0.3% of the population practices other religions, including Sikhism and Hinduism. Outside the principal urban centres, much of the population is organized into tribal or other kinship-based groups that maintain their own traditional customs.

== Population size and distribution ==
Anatol Lieven of Georgetown University in Qatar wrote in 2021 that "it may be noted that in the whole of modern Afghan history there has never been a census that could be regarded as remotely reliable."

=== Historical ===
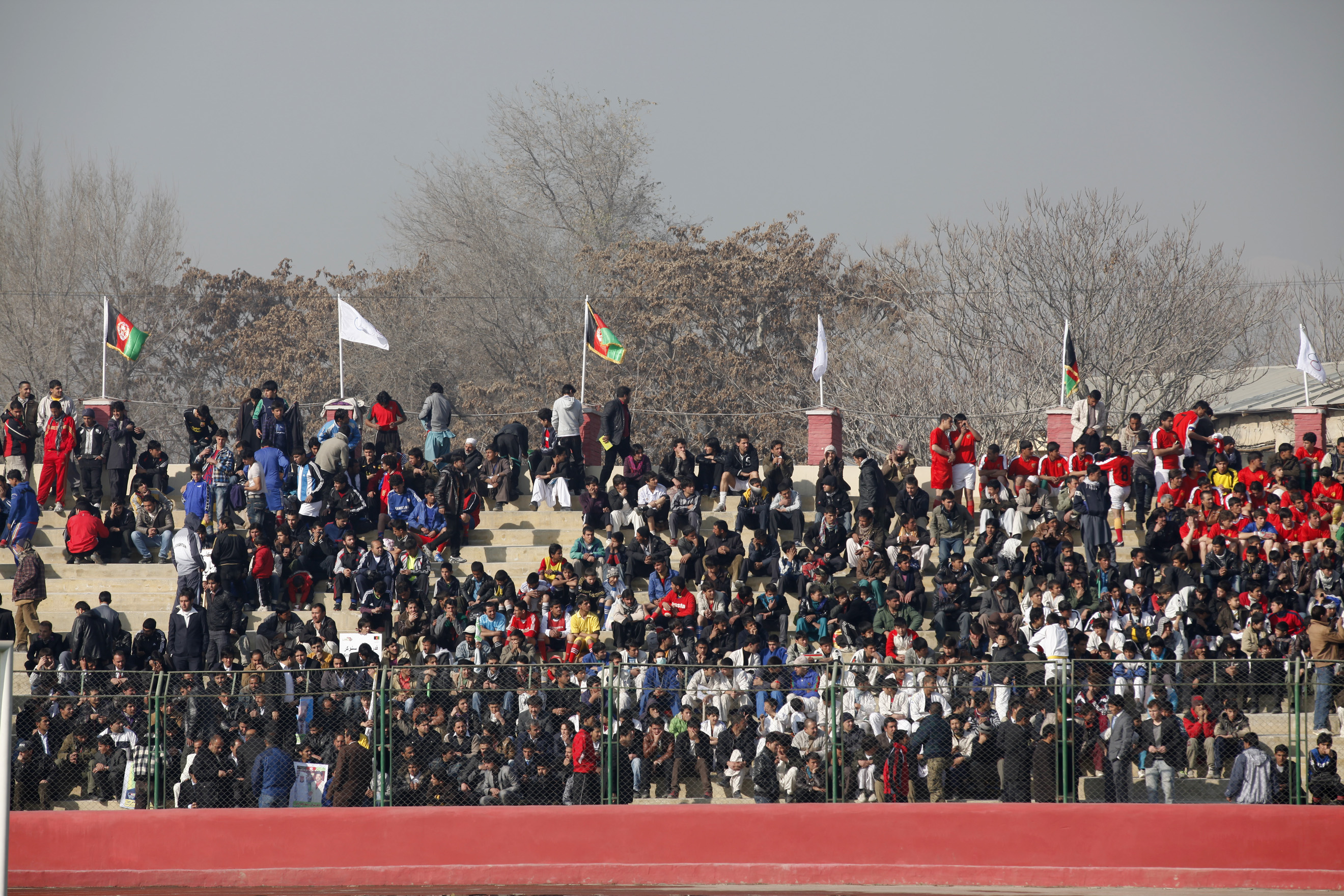
Sport fans inside the Ghazi Stadium in the capital of Kabul, which is multi-ethnic and the largest city of Afghanistan.

The first and only nationwide census of Afghanistan was carried out in 1979. It revealed a population of 13,051,358 (rural 11,037,231, urban 2,014,127). Previously there had been scattered attempts to conduct censuses in individual cities. According to the 1876 census, Kabul had a population of 140,700 people. In Kandahar in 1891 a population census was carried out, according to which 31,514 people lived in the city, of which 16,064 were men and 15,450 were women.

From 1979 until the end of 1983, some 5 million people left the country to take shelter in neighbouring northwestern Pakistan and eastern Iran. This exodus was largely unchecked by any government. The Afghan government in 1983 reported a population of 15.96 million, which presumably included the exodus.

It is assumed that roughly 600,000 to as high as 2 million Afghans may have been killed during the various 1979–2001 wars. These figures are questionable and no attempt has ever been made to verify if they were actually killed or had moved to neighbouring countries as refugees.

As no census has been performed after 1979 and millions of people may have left the country, the current population of Afghanistan can only be guessed.

=== Current and latest ===
As of 2021, the total population of Afghanistan is around 37.5 million, which includes the 3 million Afghan nationals living in both Pakistan and Iran. About 26% of the population is urbanite and the remaining 74% lives in rural areas.

Afghanistan's Central Statistics Organization (CSO) stated in 2011 that the total number of Afghans living inside Afghanistan was about 26 million and by 2017 it reached 29.2 million. Of this, 15 million are males and 14.2 million are females. The country's population is expected to reach 82 million by 2050.

Urban areas have experienced rapid population growth in the last decade, which is due to the return of over 5 million expats. The only city in Afghanistan with over a million residents is its capital, Kabul.

=== Structure of the population ===
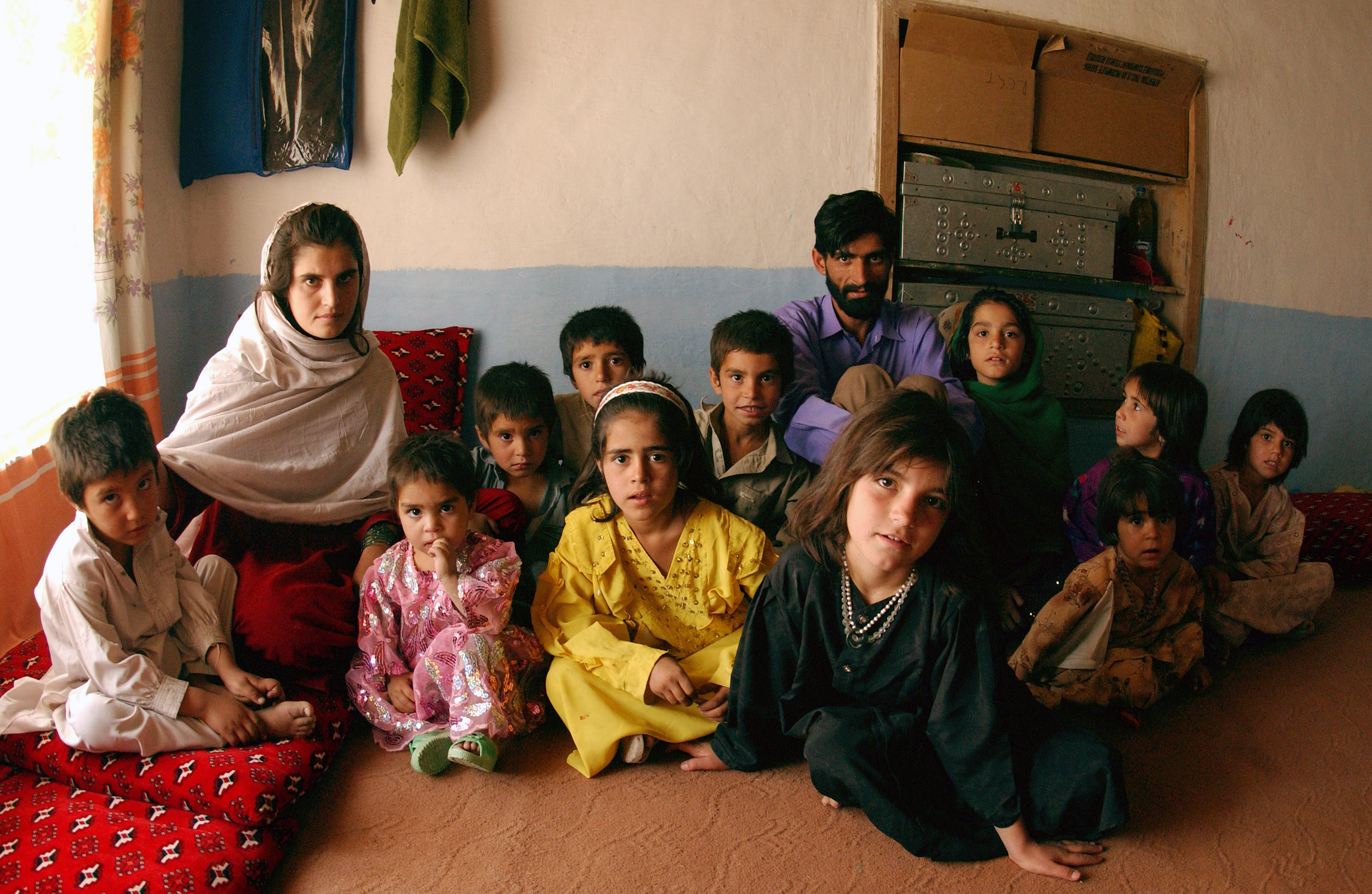
An Afghan family from the Pashtun ethnicity in their home in Kabul

Structure of the population (2012.01.07) (Data refer to the settled population based on the 1979 Population Census and the latest household prelisting. The refugees of Afghanistan in Iran, Pakistan, and an estimated 1.5 million nomads, are not included):

Population Estimates by Sex and Age Group (01.VII.2012) (Data refer to the settled population based on the 1979 Population Census and the latest household prelisting. The refugees of Afghanistan in Iran, Pakistan, and an estimated 1.5 million nomads, are not included.):

Age group	Male	Female	Total	%
Total	13,044,400	12,455,700	25,500,100	100
0–4	2,422,244	2,556,304	4,978,548	19.52
5–9	1,941,363	1,880,407	3,821,770	14.99
10–14	1,556,158	1,401,695	2,957,853	11.60
15–19	1,276,563	1,140,810	2,417,373	9.48
20–24	1,059,939	1,009,807	2,069,746	8.12
25–29	843 967	864 738	1,708,705	6.70
30–34	678 577	745 534	1,424,111	5.58
35–39	598 045	652 326	1,250,371	4.90
40–44	546 102	533 524	1,079,626	4.23
45–49	495 190	440 789	935 979	3.67
50–54	435 143	354 633	789 776	3.10
55–59	360 394	275 468	635 862	2.49
60–64	281 627	209 152	490 779	1.92
65–69	204 376	150 137	354 513	1.39
70–74	141 729	102 048	243 777	0.96
75–79	91 164	64 658	155 822	0.61
80–84	55 446	38 699	94 145	0.37
85+	56 373	34 971	91 344	0.36
Age group	Male	Female	Total	Percent
0–14	5,919,765	5,838,406	11,758,171	46.11
15–64	6,575,547	6,226,781	12,802,328	50.21
65+	549 088	390 513	939 601	3.68

Population Estimates by Sex and Age Group (01.VII.2020) (Data refer to the settled population based on the 1979 Population Census and the latest household prelisting. The refugees of Afghanistan in Iran, Pakistan, and an estimated 1.5 million nomads, are not included.):

Age group	Male	Female	Total	%
Total	15,981,303	15,408,868	31,390,171	100
0–4	2,853,288	2,743,103	5,596,391	17.83
5–9	2,542,405	2,379,618	4,922,023	15.68
10–14	2,220,065	2,026,796	4,246,861	13.53
15–19	1,840,432	1,727,287	3,567,719	11.37
20–24	1,371,188	1,463,797	2,834,985	9.03
25–29	1,079,117	1,177,555	2,256,672	7.19
30–34	828 055	818 313	1,646,368	5.24
35–39	674 920	661 949	1,336,869	4.26
40–44	577 135	611 016	1,188,151	3.79
45–49	480 700	511 608	992 308	3.16
50–54	381 772	396 026	777 798	2.48
55–59	320 024	308 966	628 990	2.00
60–64	286 732	229 605	516 337	1.64
65–69	222 590	161 851	384 441	1.22
70–74	150 436	99 412	249 848	0.80
75–79	70 271	42 288	112 559	0.36
80–84	48 540	26 549	75 089	0.24
85+	33 633	23 129	56 762	0.18
Age group	Male	Female	Total	Percent
0–14	7,615,758	7,149,517	14,765,275	47.04
15–64	7,840,075	7,906,122	15,746,197	50.16
65+	525 470	353 229	878 699	2.80

View source data.
View source data.
View source data.
View source data.

== Vital statistics ==
=== Vital statistics since 1950 (UN estimates) ===
	Population	Live births	Deaths	Natural change	Crude birth rate (per 1000)	Crude death rate (per 1000)	Natural Change (per 1000)	Crude Migration rate (per 1000)	Total fertility rate	Life expectancy (in years)	Infant mortality rate (per 1000 births)
1950	7,480,464	365,303	283,668	+1.09%	48.9	37.9	10.9		7.25	27.73	285.8
1951	7,571,542	372,040	282,577	+1.18%	49.1	37.3	11.8	0.2	7.26	27.96	283.6
1952	7,667,534	378,290	280,803	+1.27%	49.3	36.6	12.7	−0.2	7.26	28.45	278.8
1953	7,764,549	384,933	279,684	+1.35%	49.5	36.0	13.5	−1.0	7.27	28.93	273.9
1954	7,864,289	390,412	280,476	+1.40%	49.6	35.6	14.0	−1.3	7.25	29.23	269.4
1955	7,971,933	397,156	277,695	+1.50%	49.8	34.8	15.0	−1.5	7.26	29.92	264.1
1956	8,087,730	404,134	277,328	+1.57%	49.9	34.3	15.7	−1.4	7.27	30.41	259.3
1957	8,210,207	410,977	276,560	+1.64%	50.0	33.7	16.4	−1.5	7.26	30.95	254.4
1958	8,333,827	418,266	275,681	+1.71%	50.1	33.0	17.1	−2.3	7.27	31.51	249.5
1959	8,468,220	425,334	274,920	+1.78%	50.2	32.5	17.8	−1.9	7.28	32.04	244.9
1960	8,622,473	434,057	275,239	+1.84%	50.3	31.9	18.4	−0.5	7.28	32.54	240.5
1961	8,790,140	443,319	275,508	+1.91%	50.4	31.3	19.1	0	7.28	33.07	236.2
1962	8,969,055	453,468	276,593	+1.97%	50.6	30.8	19.7	0.2	7.29	33.55	232.2
1963	9,157,463	464,225	277,961	+2.03%	50.7	30.4	20.3	0.3	7.30	34.02	228.2
1964	9,355,510	475,452	279,368	+2.10%	50.8	29.9	21.0	0.2	7.30	34.49	224.3
1965	9,565,154	486,406	281,003	+2.15%	50.9	29.4	21.5	0.4	7.31	34.95	220.6
1966	9,783,153	498,801	282,463	+2.21%	51.0	28.9	22.1	0.2	7.32	35.45	216.6
1967	10,010,037	511,245	284,203	+2.27%	51.1	28.4	22.7	0.0	7.34	35.92	212.9
1968	10,247,782	524,167	285,867	+2.33%	51.1	27.9	23.3	−0.1	7.36	36.42	209.1
1969	10,494,491	537,318	287,557	+2.38%	51.2	27.4	23.8	−0.3	7.39	36.91	205.3
1970	10,752,973	549,695	288,979	+2.42%	51.1	26.9	24.2	−0.2	7.40	37.42	201.5
1971	11,015,853	564,040	290,646	+2.48%	51.2	26.4	24.8	−0.9	7.43	37.92	197.7
1972	11,286,753	577,071	291,819	+2.53%	51.1	25.8	25.3	−1.3	7.45	38.44	194.0
1973	11,575,308	591,855	292,915	+2.58%	51.1	25.3	25.8	−0.9	7.49	39.00	190.1
1974	11,869,881	607,606	294,363	+2.64%	51.1	24.8	26.4	−1.6	7.53	39.55	186.2
1975	12,157,390	621,494	295,301	+2.68%	51.0	24.2	26.8	−3.2	7.54	40.10	182.2
1976	12,425,276	635,188	295,770	+2.72%	50.9	23.7	27.2	−5.6	7.56	40.65	178.3
1977	12,687,308	648,307	295,112	+2.77%	50.9	23.2	27.7	−7.0	7.59	41.23	174.2
1978	12,938,864	660,606	310,376	+2.69%	50.8	23.9	26.9	−7.5	7.60	40.27	172.7
1979	12,986,378	671,213	328,042	+2.64%	50.7	24.8	25.9	−22.7	7.61	39.09	171.7
1980	12,486,640	660,892	316,937	+2.75%	50.5	24.2	26.3	−67.5	7.59	39.62	167.8
1981	11,155,196	614,273	288,555	+2.92%	50.3	23.6	26.7	−148.6	7.57	40.16	163.6
1982	10,088,290	520,603	266,040	+2.52%	50.1	25.6	24.5	−131.0	7.55	37.77	165.2
1983	9,951,447	503,887	252,318	+2.50%	50.1	25.1	25.0	−38.8	7.54	38.19	161.4
1984	10,243,689	506,571	302,824	+2.02%	50.2	30.0	20.2	8.3	7.51	33.33	169.7
1985	10,512,220	536,861	314,987	+2.09%	50.6	29.7	20.9	4.6	7.52	33.55	166.4
1986	10,448,447	541,017	252,810	+2.76%	50.7	23.7	27.0	−33.7	7.52	39.40	150.3
1987	10,322,767	535,214	245,107	+2.81%	50.8	23.3	27.6	−40.3	7.53	39.84	146.5
1988	10,383,459	531,795	208,051	+3.10%	51.0	19.9	31.0	−25.2	7.53	43.96	136.0
1989	10,673,172	546,142	203,321	+3.21%	51.2	19.0	32.1	−5.0	7.53	45.16	131.1
1990	10,694,804	567,256	203,514	+3.40%	51.4	18.4	33.0	−32.0	7.56	45.97	127.0
1991	10,745,168	555,610	192,531	+3.38%	51.8	17.9	33.8	−29.1	7.61	46.66	123.4
1992	12,057,436	578,891	191,913	+3.21%	51.9	17.2	34.7	76.7	7.66	47.60	118.3
1993	14,003,764	698,469	199,165	+3.57%	52.0	14.8	37.2	103.3	7.72	51.47	110.8
1994	15,455,560	789,282	222,214	+3.67%	52.2	14.7	37.5	57.2	7.72	51.50	107.0
1995	16,418,911	853,355	230,943	+3.80%	52.1	14.1	38.0	20.7	7.71	52.54	104.2
1996	17,106,600	886,917	232,991	+3.82%	51.9	13.6	38.2	2.0	7.71	53.24	101.2
1997	17,788,818	914,412	237,216	+3.81%	51.4	13.3	38.1	0.3	7.67	53.63	98.9
1998	18,493,134	940,233	250,677	+3.73%	50.9	13.6	37.3	0.8	7.64	52.94	97.0
1999	19,262,854	967,977	239,604	+3.79%	50.4	12.5	37.9	2.1	7.60	54.85	93.4
2000	19,542,986	995,813	242,535	+3.76%	49.7	12.1	37.6	−23.3	7.53	55.30	90.8
2001	19,688,634	969,246	231,795	+3.73%	49.0	11.7	37.3	−29.9	7.45	55.80	88.4
2002	21,000,258	980,458	229,450	+3.58%	48.2	11.3	36.9	26.7	7.34	56.45	85.8
2003	22,645,136	1,063,246	240,215	+3.63%	47.4	10.7	36.7	36.3	7.22	57.34	82.6
2004	23,553,554	1,097,160	243,367	+3.61%	46.3	10.3	36.1	2.5	7.07	57.94	79.9
2005	24,411,196	1,099,366	241,454	+3.53%	45.3	9.9	35.3	−0.2	6.91	58.36	77.5
2006	25,442,946	1,136,774	246,037	+3.50%	44.7	9.7	35.0	5.6	6.72	58.68	74.9
2007	25,903,306	1,156,957	246,898	+3.51%	43.9	9.4	34.5	−17.3	6.53	59.11	71.9
2008	26,427,204	1,091,824	232,339	+3.27%	41.5	8.8	32.7	−12.9	6.38	59.85	69.2
2009	27,385,310	1,128,666	234,065	+3.26%	41.2	8.5	32.6	2.4	6.24	60.36	67.2
2010	28,189,672	1,147,643	233,308	+3.23%	40.6	8.3	32.3	−3.8	6.10	60.85	64.8
2011	29,249,156	1,157,518	230,346	+3.19%	39.9	7.9	31.9	4.3	5.96	61.42	62.3
2012	30,466,484	1,217,396	234,629	+3.23%	40.0	7.7	32.3	7.7	5.83	61.92	60.0
2013	31,541,216	1,248,455	235,744	+3.21%	39.6	7.5	32.1	2.0	5.70	62.42	57.8
2014	32,716,214	1,274,665	241,055	+3.17%	39.1	7.4	31.7	4.2	5.56	62.55	56.3
2015	33,753,500	1,315,633	248,560	+3.15%	38.8	7.3	31.5	−0.8	5.41	62.66	54.5
2016	34,636,212	1,315,746	245,452	+3.09%	37.9	7.1	30.9	−5.4	5.26	63.14	52.5
2017	35,643,420	1,332,116	250,677	+3.03%	37.3	7.0	30.3	−2.0	5.13	63.02	49.4
2018	36,686,788	1,355,895	256,314	+2.99%	36.9	7.0	29.9	−1.5	5.00	63.08	47.8
2019	37,769,496	1,377,704	256,564	+2.97%	36.5	6.8	29.7	−1.0	4.87	63.57	46.7
2020	38,972,236	1,402,265	276,683	+2.89%	36.1	7.1	28.9	2.0	4.75	62.58	45.8
2021	40,099,460	1,440,941	295,236	+2.85%	35.8	7.3	28.5	−0.4	4.64	61.98	44.7
2022	41,128,771			+2.82%	35.14	6.91	28.23	−3.2	4.52	62.88	44.8
2023	42,239,854								4.41	64.23	37.7

=== Fertility rate ===
==== Before 1950 ====
Years	1925	1926	1927	1928	1929	1930	1931	1932	1933	1934
Total Fertility Rate in Afghanistan	7	7.03	7.05	7.08	7.11	7.14	7.16	7.19	7.22	7.24

Years	1935	1936	1937	1938	1939	1940	1941	1942	1943	1944
Total Fertility Rate in Afghanistan	7.27	7.3	7.32	7.35	7.38	7.4	7.43	7.46	7.48	7.51

Years	1945	1946	1947	1948	1949
Total Fertility Rate in Afghanistan	7.54	7.56	7.59	7.62	7.64

==== Fertility data by province ====
Estimations from 2015 (DHS Survey) and 2022–23 (MICS Survey).

Province	TFR	
Province	2015	2023
Afghanistan	5.3	5.4 ▲
Kabul	4.6	3.8 ▼
Kapisa	4.8	5.6 ▲
Parwan	5.7	5.0 ▼
Wardak	4.2	5.3 ▲
Logar	4.2	6.2 ▲
Nangarhar	6.4	5.6 ▼
Laghman	7.3	6.2 ▼
Panjshir	3.2	3.5 ▲
Baghlan	4.4	5.4 ▲
Bamyan	5.4	4.2 ▼
Ghazni	2.8	5.6 ▲
Paktika	5.3	6.3 ▲
Paktia	5.2	5.7 ▲
Khost	5.6	5.3 ▼
Kunar	6.8	6.4 ▼
Nuristan	8.9	5.6 ▼
Badakhshan	5.3	5.1 ▼
Takhar	5.7	5.9 ▲
Kunduz	4.4	6.4 ▲
Samangan	5.1	4.3 ▼
Balkh	5.5	4.9 ▼
Sar-e Pol	4.8	5.5 ▲
Ghor	5.8	4.8 ▼
Daykundi	5.2	4.8 ▼
Urozgan	8.8	5.6 ▼
Zabul	5.1	7.8 ▲
Kandahar	6.5	6.3 ▼
Jawzjan	3.9	5.5 ▲
Faryab	6.2	6.4 ▲
Helmand	4.7	7.3 ▲
Badghis	6.6	5.8 ▼
Herat	4.8	4.4 ▼
Farah	5.4	7.1 ▲
Nimruz	5.4	6.2 ▲

=== Infant-related statistics ===
Afghanistan 2024 total fertility rate has been estimated at 4.4. In 2022 it was 4.5, about twice the world average rate. The rate has fallen since the early 1990s.

==== Crude Birth Rate (CBR), Total Fertility Rate (TFR) and Wanted Fertility Rate (WFR) ====
year	crude birth rate (CBR)			total fertility rate (TFR)			wanted fertility rate (WFR)		
year	total	urban	rural	total	urban	rural	total	urban	rural
2010	35.6	34.7	35.9	5.1	4.5	5.2			
2015	36.8 ▲	35.8 ▲	37.1 ▲	5.3 ▲	4.8 ▲	5.4 ▲	4.4 ▼	3.7 ▼	4.6 ▼
2022–23	36.0 ▼	32.0 ▼	38.0 ▲	5.4 ▲	4.3 ▼	5.8 ▲			

=== Life expectancy ===
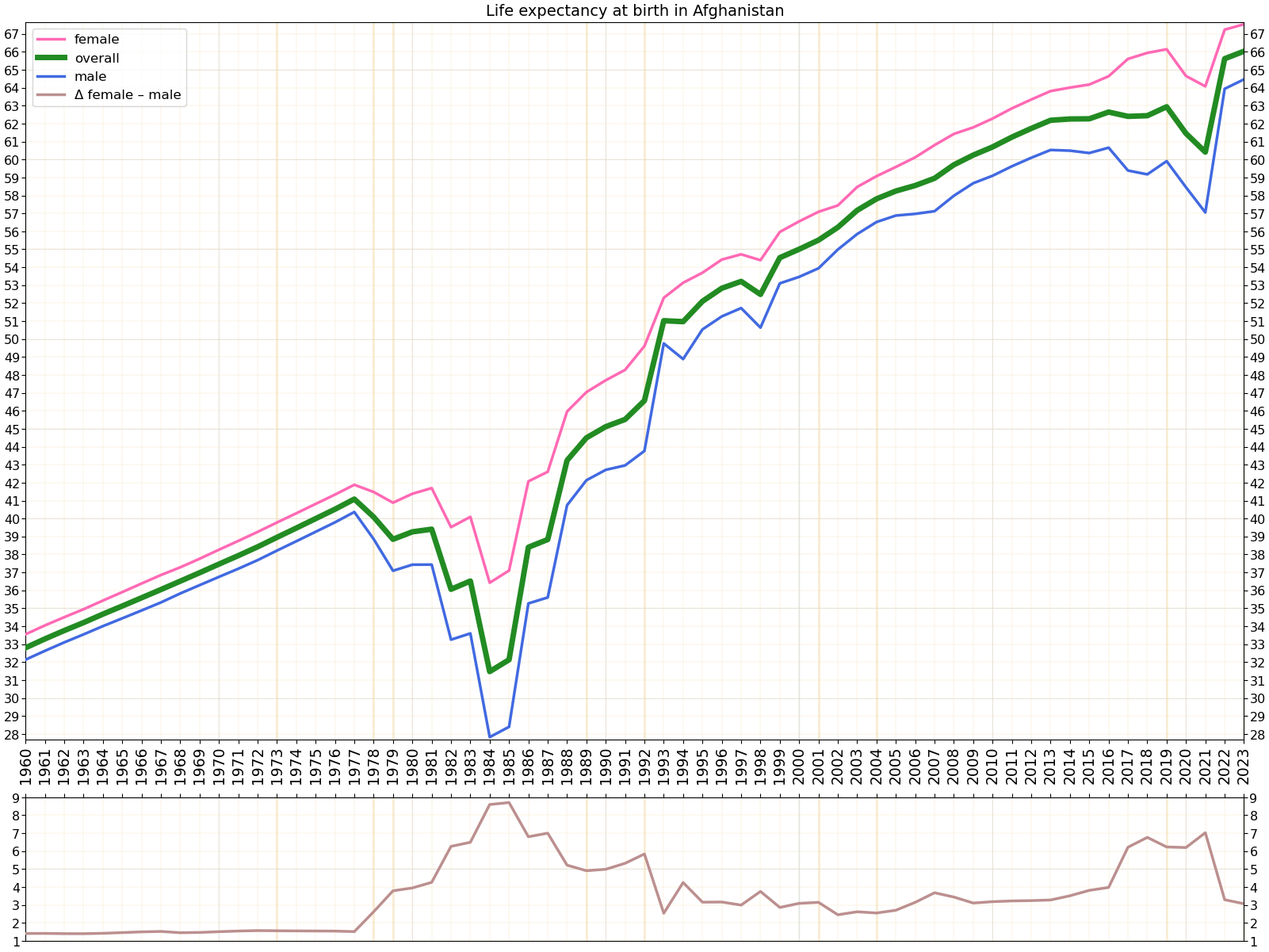
Life expectancy at birth in Afghanistan

Period	Life expectancy in Years	Period	Life expectancy in Years
1950–1955	28.6	1985–1990	47.7
1955–1960	31.1	1990–1995	51.7
1960–1965	33.4	1995–2000	54.2
1965–1970	35.6	2000–2005	56.9
1970–1975	37.8	2005–2010	60.0
1975–1980	40.4	2010–2015	62.3
1980–1985	43.6	2015–2020	63.2

Source: UN World Population Prospects

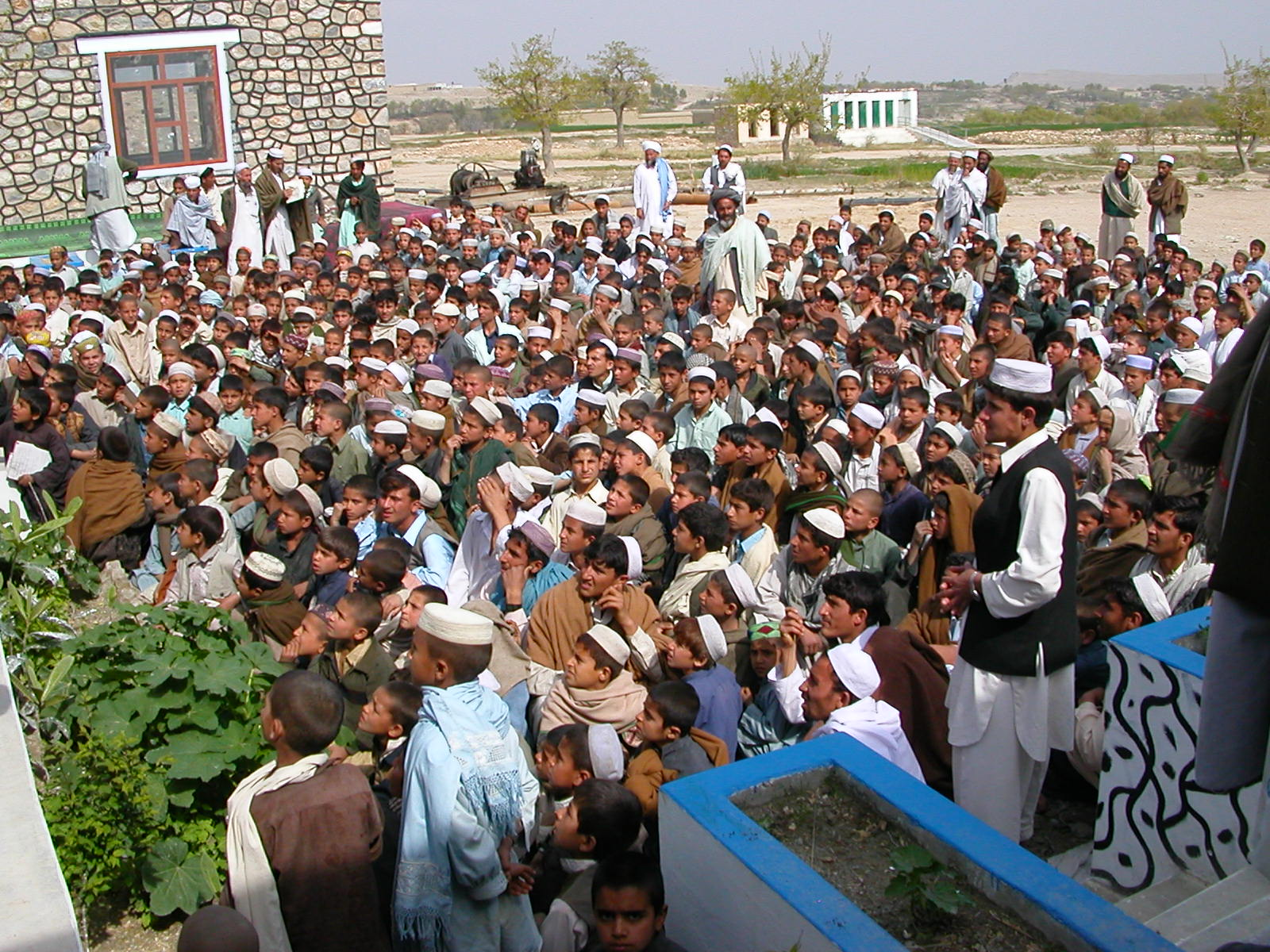
Gathering of students in 2006 at a school in Nangarhar Province.

== Ethnicity ==
An approximate distribution of the ethnolinguistic groups are listed in the chart below:

A CIA map showing the various Afghan tribal territories in 2005

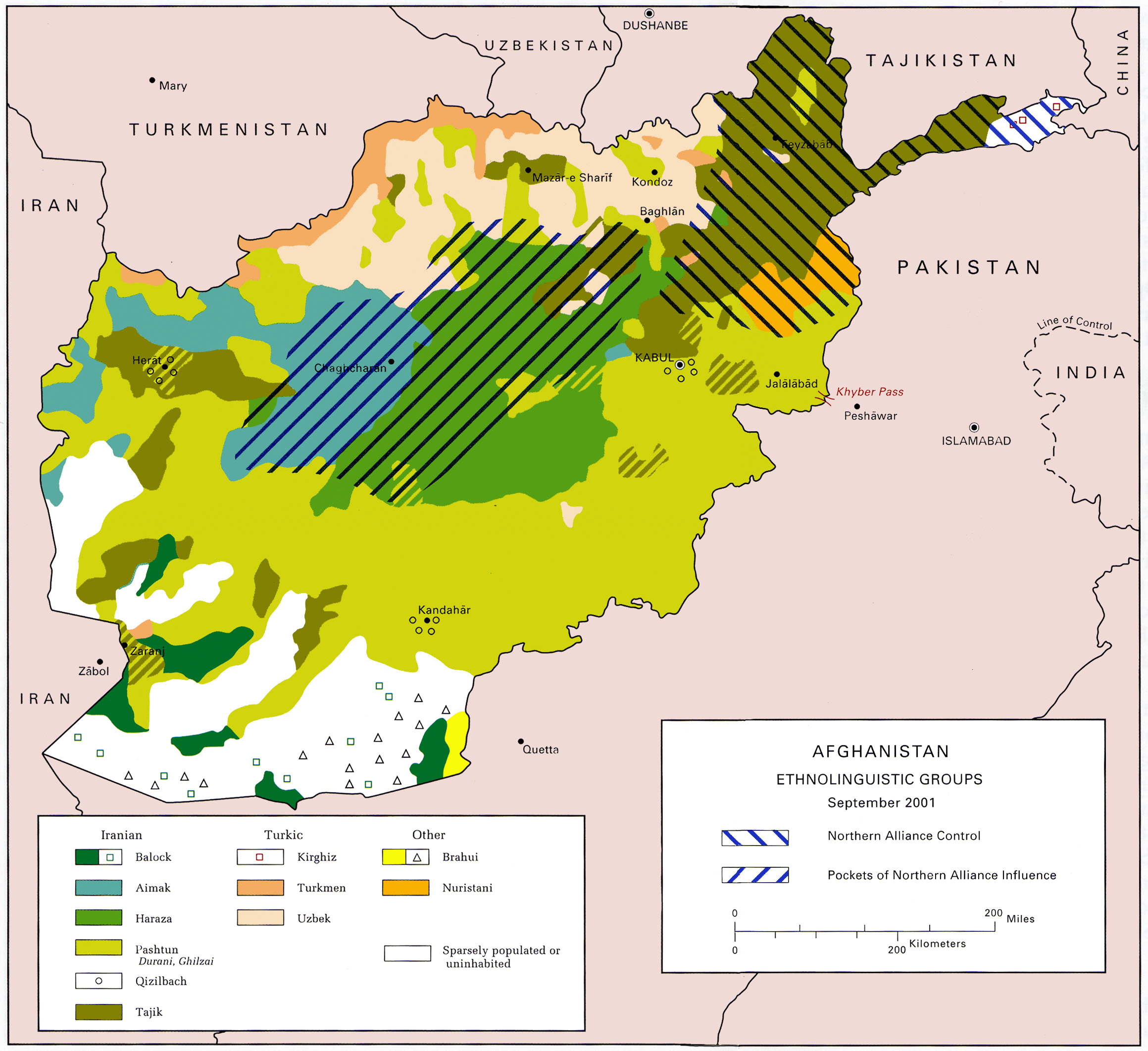
Ethnolinguistic groups in Afghanistan in 2001

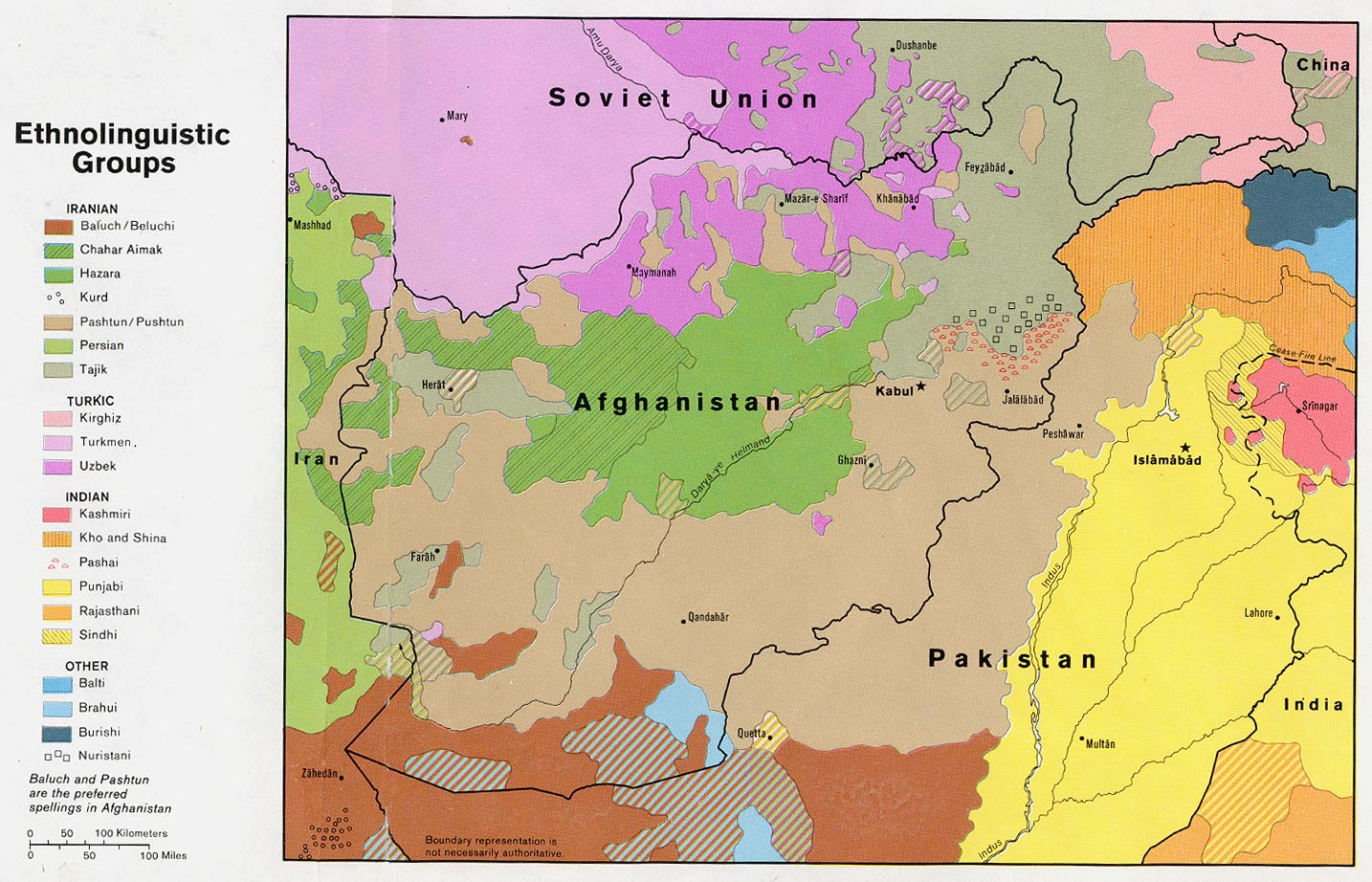
Ethnolinguistic groups in Afghanistan and nearby regions in 1982

Ethnic groups in Afghanistan based on alternative estimates
Ethnic group	Image	Estimate based on native mother tongue	The World Factbook	Library of Congress Country Studies	Gulf/2000 Project
Pashtun	Children in Khost province	38.5%_42%	42%	40%	38.5%
Tajik	Tajik children in Khowahan district of Badakhshan	58.2% (Note: This number represents Dari Persian native speakers including Tajiks, Hazaras, Aimaks, Qizilbash and other smaller ethnicities.)	27%	25.3%	24.5%
Hazara	Hazaras on the anniversary of Abdul Ali Mazari's death in 2021 in Kabul	58.2%	9%	18%	24.5%
Uzbek	Uzbek looking boy in northern Afghanistan	5%	9%	6.3%	6%
Aimak		–	4%	–	In many sources, the Aimaks are considered part of the Tajiks.
Turkmen		1.2%	3%	2.5%	1.2%
Baloch	Camera focusing on Baloch	1%	2%	–	0.5%
Others (Pashai, Nuristani, Arab, Brahui, Qizilbash, Pamiri, etc.)	Young Pashai man	2.1%	4%	7.9%	4.9%

The recent estimate in the above chart is somewhat supported by the below national opinion polls, which were aimed at knowing how a group of about 804 to 8,706 local residents in Afghanistan felt about the current war, political situation, as well as the economic and social issues affecting their daily lives. Ten surveys were conducted between 2004 and 2015 by the Asia Foundation (a sample is shown in the table below; the survey in 2015 did not contain information on the ethnicity of the participants) and one between 2004 and 2009 by a combined effort of the broadcasting companies NBC News, BBC, and ARD.

Answers regarding ethnicity provided by 804 to 13,943 Afghans in national opinion polls
Ethnic group	"Afghanistan: Where Things Stand" (2004) "A survey of the Afghan people" (2004)	"Afghanistan: Where Things Stand" (2005)	"Afghanistan: Where Things Stand" (2006)	"Afghanistan: Where Things Stand" (2007)	"A survey of the Afghan people" (2007)	"Afghanistan: Where Things Stand" (2009)	"A survey of the Afghan people" (2012)	"A survey of the Afghan people" (2014)	"A survey of the Afghan people" (2018)	"A survey of the Afghan people" (2019)
Pashtun	56%	50%	52%	48%	50.1%	50%	50%	50%	48%	49%
Tajik	29%	27%	27%	28%	25.1%	27%	23%	26%	27%	27%
Hazara	6%	13%	12%	6%	10.0%	11%	11%	10%	10%	11%
Uzbek	6%	6%	5%	6%	8.1%	7%	9%	8%	9%	8%
Aimak	0%	0%	0%	0%	0.8%	0%	1%	1%	1%	<0.5%
Turkmen	1%	1%	3%	2%	3.1%	2%	2%	2%	2%	2%
Baloch	0%	0%	0%	3%	0.7%	1%	1%	1%	1%	<0.5%
Others (Pashayi, Nuristani, Kurdish, Arab, Qizilbash.)	3%	3%	1%	5%	2.1%	3%	3%	2%	2%	3%
Don't know	-%	-%	-%	-%	-%	-%	-%	-%	1%	-%

== Languages ==
Map of Pashto-speaking areas in Afghanistan and Pakistan

Dari and Pashto are both official languages of Afghanistan. Uzbek and Turkmen are spoken as native languages in northern provinces, mainly among the Uzbeks and Turkmens. Smaller number of Afghans are also fluent in English, Urdu, Balochi, Arabic and other languages. An approximate distribution of languages spoken in the country is shown in the chart below:

Languages of Afghanistan
Language	Recent estimate including both L1 and L2 speakers	Pre-1992 estimates
Dari (incl. Eastern, Kabuli, Hazaragi & Aimaqi)	77%	25–35% (L1)
Pashto (incl. Northern and Southern)	48%	50–55% (L1) <10% (L2)
Turkic languages (incl. Uzbek and Turkmen)	11% (Uzbek); 3% (Turkmen)	11% (L1)
other indigenous languages (incl. Pashayi, Balochi, Nuristani)	1% (Pashayi); 1% (Balochi); 1% (Nuristani)	4% (L1)
other non-indigenous languages	6% English; 3% Urdu; 1% Arabic	
^{1} note: data represent most widely spoken languages; shares sum to more than 100% because there is much bilingualism in the country and because respondents were allowed to select more than one language note: the Turkic languages Uzbek and Turkmen, as well as Balochi, Pashayi, Nuristani, and Pamiri are the third official languages in areas where the majority speaks them

Based on information from the latest national opinion polls, up to 51% stated that they can speak or understand Pashto and up to 79% stated that they can speak or understand Dari. Uzbek was spoken or understood by up to 11% and Turkmen by up to 7%. Other languages that can be spoken are Arabic (4%) and Balochi (2%).

== Religion ==
Religion in Afghanistan (2015)
Religion	Percent
Sunni Islam	89.7%
Shia Islam	10%
others	0.3%

Almost the entire Afghan population is Muslim, with less than 1% being non-Muslim. Buddhism was at first permitted by Muslim conquerors if the Buddhsit adherants paid a tax known as dhimmi, but eventually starting with Umar II (717-72), Islam was ordered to be the religion of the people.over the period of the following centuries until approximately 1336, when Buddhism was almost totally eradicated and replaced by Islam. Despite attempts to secularise Afghan society, Islamic practices pervade all aspects of life. Likewise, Islamic religious tradition and codes, together with traditional practices, provide the principal means of controlling personal conduct and settling legal disputes. Islam was used as the main basis for expressing opposition to the progressive reforms of Afghanistan by King Amanullah in the 1920s.

The members of Sikh and Hindu communities are mostly concentrated in urban areas. They numbered hundreds of thousands in the 1970s but over 90% have since fled due to the Afghan wars and persecution.

- Islam: 99.7% of the total population
  - Sunni Muslim: 84.7–89.7%
  - Shia Muslim: 7-15%
- others: 0.3%
  - Baha'is In the hundreds
  - Sikhism: In the hundreds
  - Hinduism: In the hundreds
  - Zoroastrianism: Unknown/unreported
  - Christianity: Unknown
  - Judaism: 0
  - Buddhism: Unknown

National opinion polls (religion)
Religion	"A survey of the Afghan people" (2004)	"A survey of the Afghan people" (2006)	"A survey of the Afghan people" (2007)	"A survey of the Afghan people" (2008)	"A survey of the Afghan people" (2009)	"A survey of the Afghan people" (2010)	"A survey of the Afghan people" (2011)	"A survey of the Afghan people" (2012)
Sunni Islam	92%	"	87.3%	"	"	"	"	"
Shia Islam	7%	"	12.3%	"	"	"	"	"
Ismailism	1%	"	0.4%	"	"	"	"	"
Hinduism	0%	"	0.1%	"	"	"	"	"
Buddhism	0%	"	0%	"	"	"	"	"
Sikhism	0%	"	0%	"	"	"	"	"

== See also ==
- Culture of Afghanistan
- Baloch of Afghanistan
- Turks in Afghanistan
- Tajiks in Afghanistan
- Afghan Turkmens
- Afghan Kurds
