= Catholic Church in Afghanistan =

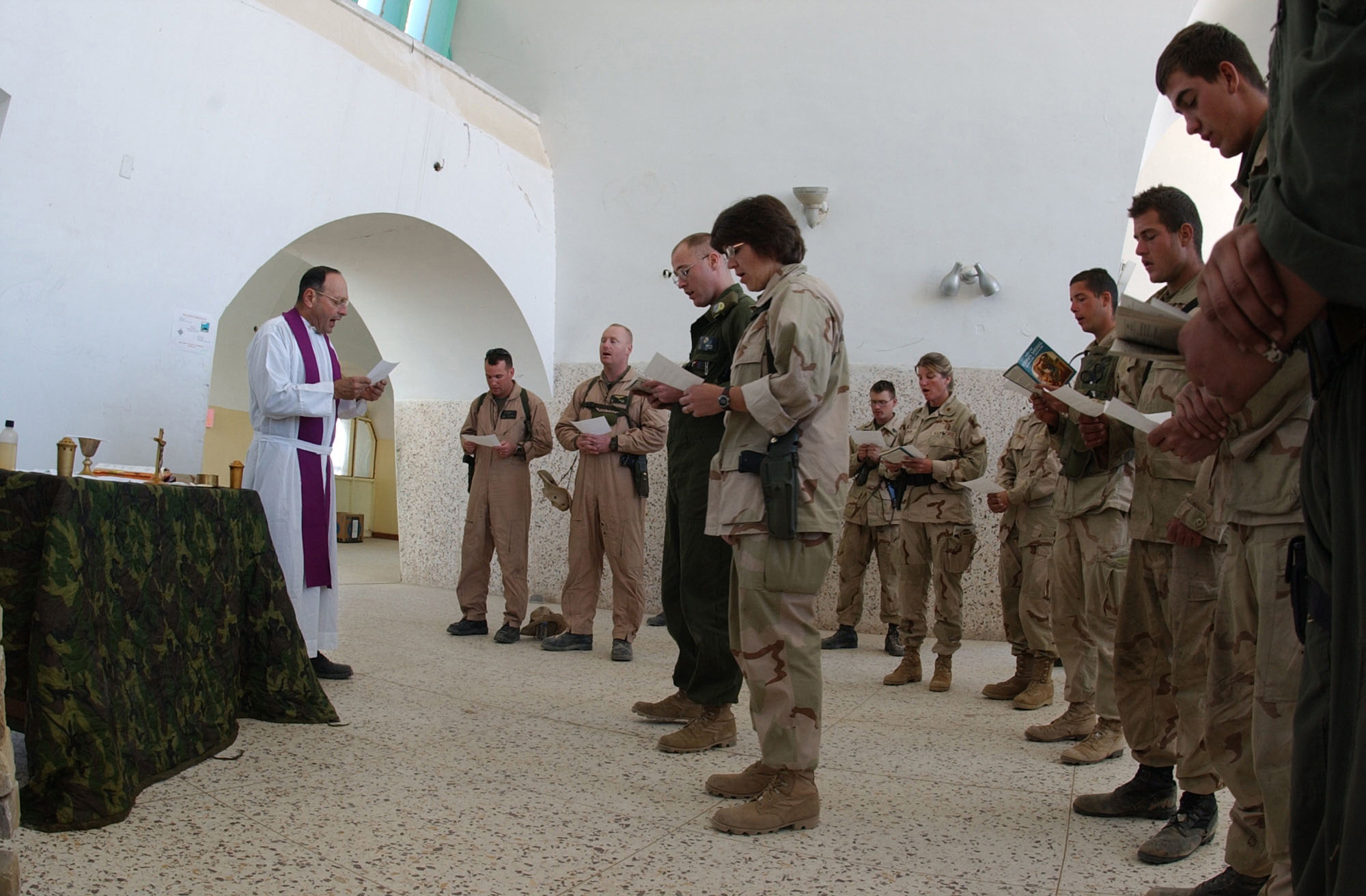
Kandahar, Afghanistan (Dec. 23, 2001) – A U.S. Navy chaplain, Commander Joseph Scordo of Pleasantville, NY, celebrates Catholic Mass for U.S. military personnel at a forward operating base in Kandahar, Afghanistan.

The Catholic Church in Afghanistan is part of the worldwide Catholic Church. Prior to August 2021, there were very few Catholics in this overwhelmingly Muslim country—just over 200 attended Mass in its only chapel—and freedom of religion has been difficult to obtain, especially under the Taliban-led Afghan government.

Earlier Christians in Afghanistan were members of the historical Church of the East or the Armenian Apostolic Church, and there had been no sustained Catholic presence in Afghanistan until the 20th century. In 1921, the Italian embassy in Kabul was allowed to build the first and only legal Catholic chapel to serve foreigners working in the capital, but not open to local nationals. On May 16, 2002, Pope John Paul II established a mission sui iuris for Afghanistan with Giuseppe Moretti as its first superior; Giovanni Scalese served as superior from 2014 until the community's departure in August 2021. In 2004, the Missionaries of Charity arrived in Kabul to carry out humanitarian work. Following the 2021 Taliban offensive, the Catholic Church ceased to have a functioning presence in Afghanistan.

== History ==
=== Before Afghan Independence ===
Legend from the apocryphal Acts of Thomas and other ancient documents suggests that Thomas the Apostle preached in Bactria, which is today northern Afghanistan. The Nestorians planted Christianity in the area, and there were historically nine bishops and dioceses in the region, including Herat (424–1310), Farah (544–1057), Kandahar, and Balkh. This early establishment of Christianity was overcome by the Muslim conquests in the 7th century, though the territory was not substantially controlled by Muslims until the 9th and 10th centuries. In 1581 and 1582 respectively, the Jesuits Antonio de Montserrat of Spain and Bento de Góis of Portugal were warmly welcomed by the Islamic Emperor Akbar, but there was no lasting Jesuit presence in the country.

=== 20th century ===
The Kingdom of Italy was the first country to recognise the Anglo-Afghan Treaty of 1919. On January 1, 1933, Egidio Caspani inaugurated the provisional chapel. His appointment was a personal request of Pope Pius XI to the Barnabite Superior General. Caspani had been the Rector of the Barnabite Seminary in Rome. To accompany him on this journey one of his students was ordained and sent with him, not publicly as a priest, but as his Diplomatic Courier and assistant Chancellor at the Embassy. Thus Ernesto Cagnacci also began this new mission in Kabul. "At the time the Catholic residents numbered in the hundreds, the majority of them in the capital, members of embassies or contractors employed by the Government of Afghanistan; others were dispersed throughout the country and were generally technicians and specialized workers, that lent their skills to the construction of various public works that marked the progress of the country." In addition to his pastoral work, Caspani kept detailed notes of the politics, culture and geography of the land. These observations were later published in an Italian volume published in collaboration with Cagnacci entitled, "Afghanistan, crocevie dell'Asia". Over the years a number of Barnabites have served as chaplains. After Caspani there was: Giovanni M. Bernasconi, 1947–1957; Raffaele Nannetti, 1957–1965; and Angelo Panigati, 1965–1990.

During this period, Serge de Beaurecueil was the only Catholic priest engaged in ministry in Afghanistan rather than in the Italian embassy, from 1963 until his 1983 expulsion during the Soviet-Afghan War.

=== Soviet invasion period and Taliban insurgency ===
Pope John Paul II called for a "just solution" to the Soviet–Afghan war in the 1980s. Giuseppe Moretti first came to Afghanistan in 1977, and stayed until he was shot when the Italian embassy was attacked in 1994 and was forced to leave the country. From 1990 to 1994 he was the only Catholic priest in the country. After 1994, only the Little Sisters of Jesus were allowed to remain in Afghanistan, as they had operated in Afghanistan since 1955 and were widely recognised. Following the attacks of September 11, 2001, Catholic Relief Services sent clothing, food and bedding to returning refugees and internally displaced persons. They also bought school supplies for children returning to school.

=== Post-Taliban ===
With the fall of the Taliban, Pope John Paul II requested that Moretti return to Afghanistan. The first Mass in 9 years was celebrated on January 27, 2002, for members of the International Security Force and various members of foreign agencies. On May 16, 2002, a mission sui iuris was created for all of Afghanistan. There was only one functioning chapel in the country, in the Italian Embassy in Kabul. Projects of the new mission included a "Peace School" for 500 students that began construction in August 2003 and intended to be up to "European standards". Three religious sisters also worked with those with mental disabilities in the capital city, teaching those with cerebral palsy how to go to the toilet and how to eat on their own. The small community faced a crisis during the kidnapping on May 17, 2005, of Clementina Cantoni, a member of CARE International, by four gunmen in Kabul as she walked to her car. Sisters from the Missionaries of Charity had their house blessed on May 9, 2006, and started taking in street children. There had been fears that their distinctive blue and white habit would make them stand out and be harassed by Muslims, but their institute was generally respected. Jesuit Relief Services also applied to join the other religious institutes operating in the country. Jesuit Refugee Services opened a technical school in Herat for 500 students including 120 girls.

There were efforts made to start inter-religious dialogue; the Islamist head of the Afghan Supreme Court Fazul Shinwari attended the inauguration of the mission and expressed a desire to meet with the Pope.

The Catholic community in Afghanistan was mainly made of foreigners, especially aid workers, and no Afghans were known to be part of the Church, mainly due to great social and legal pressure not to convert to non-Islamic religions. Some Afghans converted while overseas, but kept it secret on return. Two Christian groups, Church World Service and Norwegian Church Aid, were accused of proselytizing while doing aid work in Afghanistan, which they denied, and 1,000 Afghans protested in Mazar-i-Sharif and burned the pope in effigy. Despite this, the community grew from only a few sisters to a full Sunday Mass of around 100. Church attendance dipped in 2012 due to security concerns and decreased religiosity among foreigners in Afghanistan.

Relations with the democratic government of Afghanistan were generally positive. Afghan President Hamid Karzai attended Pope John Paul II's funeral and congratulated Pope Benedict XVI on his election.

The papal nuncio to neighboring Pakistan visited Afghanistan in 2005 and held a Mass in the Italian Embassy Chapel to an overflowing crowd, and Catholic officials at the time hoped that official diplomatic ties and a formal Catholic presence would eventually be established.

=== Taliban governance resumes ===
In the wake of the 2021 Taliban offensive, the Catholic community in Afghanistan ceased to exist. Father Giovanni Scalese, the head of the Mission sui iuris of Afghanistan, left the country with several Missionaries of Charity nuns and others who were under the nuns' care during the Taliban takeover. Several Jesuits and other religious were present in Kabul during the collapse of the Republic of Afghanistan, and there is little public information about whether any have remained in the country. As of May 2024, Father Scalese remained in Italy with no indication of a planned return.

== Mission sui iuris ==
The Mission sui iuris of Afghanistan (Latin: Missio sui juris Afghanistaniensis) is independent mission and a jurisdiction of the Catholic Church, immediately subject to the Holy See, covering the whole territory of the Islamic Republic of Afghanistan. It is a “particular church”— that is to say, a portion of the people of God – likened to a Diocese (Can. 368). By the law itself, it possesses juridical personality (Can. 373). It was established by the Holy See and entrusted to the care of the Order of Clerics Regular of Saint Paul – Barnabites (CRSP). It is presided by an Ecclesiastical Superior (Latin: Superior ecclesiasticus), who acts as the Local Ordinary (Can. 134 §2).

== Foreign military ==
Members of foreign militaries (notably on NATO mission) are served by chaplains embedded within their units. In 2009, 17,000 soldiers from the United States stationed in eastern Afghanistan were served by 6 Catholic priests, including Catholic chaplains from other countries. Some bases had weekly Masses, while remote posts had Mass every 60 to 90 days.

== In fiction ==
In the 2024 film Conclave, a fictional Archbishop of Kabul, Cardinal Vincent Benitez (Carlos Diehz), becomes a serious candidate for the papacy in the papal conclave following the death of a fictional pope. Benitez was named a cardinal in pectore (in the heart, meaning in secret), presumably to protect him from the risks of serving in the Taliban-run country.

== See also ==
- Catholic Church by country
- Christianity in Afghanistan
- Protestantism in Afghanistan

== Sources and external links ==
- GCatholic, with Google map and – satellite photo
