= Zoroastrianism in Afghanistan =

Zoroastrianism was a prominent religious belief in Afghanistan for centuries. Until half a century ago, 2,000 Zoroastrians were living in Afghanistan. For a long period of time Bactria was a center of Zoroastrianism, and Zoroaster is said to have taught in the city, perhaps in the 15th century BCE. Arachosia (modern Kandahar) was considered the second fatherland of Zoroastrianism. Additionally, Balkh is also known as one of the birthplaces of Nowruz.

== See also ==
- Religion in Afghanistan
