= Our Lady of Divine Providence Chapel, Kabul =

Our Lady of Divine Providence Chapel
- Our Lady of Divine Providence Chapel
- Location: Kabul
- Country: Afghanistan
- Denomination: Roman Catholic Church

History
- Status: Active

Architecture
- Functional status: Chapel
- Architectural type: Church
- Groundbreaking: 1921 (as an embassy)
- Completed: 1960

The Our Lady of Divine Providence Chapel or Chapel of the Italian Embassy in Kabul, was a religious building that was affiliated with the Catholic Church and located in Street Great Massoud, in the city of Kabul, capital of Afghanistan.

The chapel followed the Latin rite and depended on the Mission sui juris in Afghanistan (Missio sui iuris Afghanistaniensis) that was created by Pope John Paul II in 2002. The chapel was authorized in 1933 and had survived wars, upheavals and the time of the first Taliban government thanks to the protection provided by the Italian embassy. The parish was abandoned following the 2021 Taliban offensive.

It was under the pastoral responsibility of Italian priest Father Giuseppe Moretti from 2003 to 2014, and Father Giovanni Scalese from 2014 to 2021. The current building has its origins in 1921 when Italy and Afghanistan established diplomatic relations. It was completed in 1960. Most Christian symbols were limited, with just a small cross having been allowed at the entrance.

== See also ==
- Embassy chapel
- Catholic Church in Afghanistan
- Our Lady of Divine Providence
- Mission Sui Iuris of Afghanistan
