= Mission sui iuris of Afghanistan =

Latin Catholic missionary jurisdiction

Mission sui iuris of Afghanistan Missio sui juris Afghanistaniensis رسالت کاتولیک افغانستان
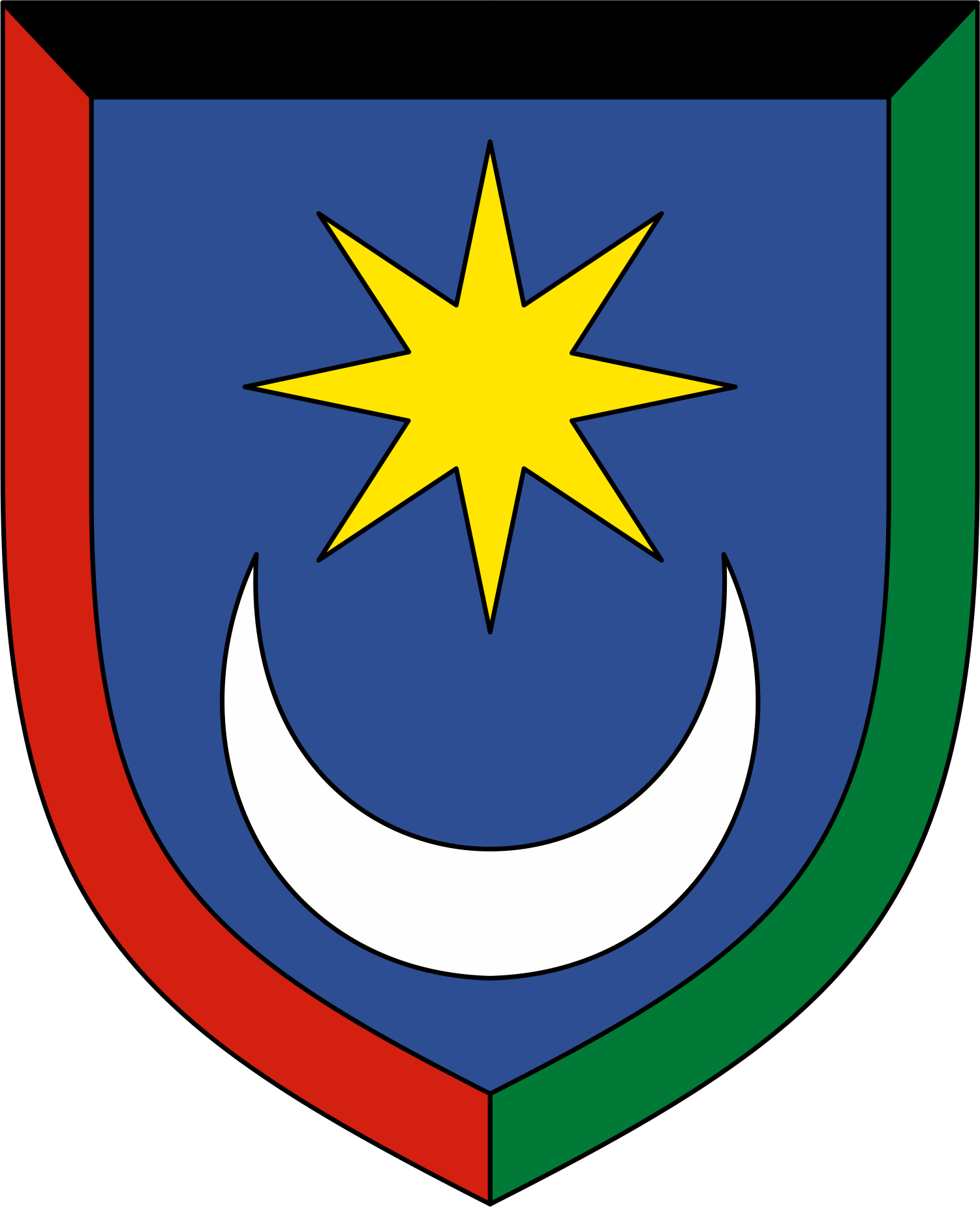
- Coat of arms

Location
- Country: Afghanistan
- Territory: Afghanistan
- Ecclesiastical province: Immediately subject to the Holy See

Statistics
- Area: 647,500 km^{2} (250,000 sq mi)
- Population: Total; Catholics: (as of 2015); 27,102,000; 205 (0.01%)
- Parishes: 1
- Churches: 1 chapel

Information
- Denomination: Catholic Church
- Sui iuris church: Latin Church
- Rite: Roman Rite
- Established: 16 May 2002
- Cathedral: Our Lady of Divine Providence Chapel, Kabul

Current leadership
- Pope: Leo XIV
- Bishop: Giovanni Scalese

The Mission sui iuris of Afghanistan (Latin: Missio sui juris Afghanistaniensis) is the sui iuris mission of Afghanistan under direct jurisdiction of the Catholic Church. It is immediately subject to the Holy See and covers the whole territory of Afghanistan. It was established by the Holy See and entrusted to the care of the Order of Clerics Regular of Saint Paul (also known as "Barnabites"). It is presided over by an Ecclesiastical Superior (Latin: Superior Ecclesiasticus), who acts as the Local Ordinary (Can. 134 §2).

== History ==
On May 16, 2002, a mission sui iuris (pre-Diocesan jurisdiction) was created for all of Afghanistan, which remains exempt. This means that it belongs to no Ecclesiastical province, but rather is directly dependent on the Holy See and its missionary branch, the Dicastery for Evangelization. On November 4, 2014, Pope Francis appointed Giovanni M. Scalese, CRSP, as the second ecclesiastical superior of the mission sui iuris in Afghanistan. The mission has one parish (in the national capital of Kabul, with the single church in the Italian embassy) with 3 Priests (religious) and 6 lay religious sisters.

=== Ecclesiastical Superiors Seco (Ecclesiastical Superiors) ===
- Fr. Giuseppe Moretti, CRSP, born in Italy 1938 (16 May 2002 – retired 4. November 2014)
- Fr. Giovanni M. Scalese, CRSP, born in Italy 1955 (4 November 2014)

=== Our Lady of Divine Providence Chapel ===
The Chapel of Our Lady of Divine Providence, or Chapel of the Italian Embassy in Kabul, was the only functional Catholic building in Afghanistan. It was located in the Street Great Massoud in the area of the Italian Embassy in Kabul.

== Coat of arms ==
=== Blazon of Coat of Crest ===
Azure, an increscent Argent with a Mullet of eight-points Or, A bordure is made up of 3 colors — Sable, Gules and Vert.

Behind the shield is the golden processional Herat cross. Under the shield is the red-lined silver ribbon with the motto "Orietur Stella" ("A Star Shall Rise").
