= Noorin TV =

Afghan TV channel

- Type: Satellite television network
- Country: Afghanistan

Ownership
- Owner: Haji Mohammad Arif Noori

History
- Launched: 2007

Links
- Website: https://web.archive.org/web/20210818232841/https://noorintv.net/en

Noorin TV (Persian: تلویزیون نورین), sometimes shortened as NTV, is a private non-governmental satellite television network that used to broadcast from Kabul in Afghanistan. The service was launched in 2007.

Noorin broadcasts news, cartoons, films, dramas, music, and many other type of programmes. Their goal is to integrate western influence in Afghan television and create a modern benchmark for how television network stations are run in Afghanistan.

The station frequently aired programmes in support of the Jamiat-e Islami.

The channel is available in Afghanistan and Europe through the Turksat 3A satellite. They also have a radio station, called Noorin FM, available throughout Afghanistan on 94.4FM. The channel airs Hindi serials dubbed in Persian and Dari such as Kahiin To Hoga. It is the fifth most watched channel in Afghanishtan, Lemar TV being the fourth.

In December 2021, broadcasting was paused when the channel owner Aref Noori was arrested by the Taliban regime. He was released a day later. But the status of the television and radio stations remains unclear and its website has gone down.

== See also ==
- List of Afghan TV Channels
