= Baháʼí Faith in Afghanistan =

The Baháʼí Faith in Afghanistan was possibly introduced in 1880s when some Baháʼís are believed to have visited Afghanistan. However, it wasn't until the 1930s that a Baháʼí community was established there. The first Baháʼí administrative institution Local Spiritual Assembly was elected in 1948 in Kabul and then was re-elected in 1969. Though the population had perhaps reached thousands, under the Soviet invasion of Afghanistan and the harsh rule of the Taliban the Baháʼís lost the right to have any institutions and many fled. Although the Association of Religion Data Archives estimated there were some 16,541 Baháʼís in 2010, the Baháʼís in Afghanistan number at approximately 400 according to a more recent 2007 US estimate.

== Early period ==
During Baháʼu'lláh's lifetime, Jamal Effendi possibly visited the area of Afghanistan in the late 1880s, according to Baháʼí sources.

The first person of Afghan descent living outside of Afghanistan who became a Baha'i was Dr. Ata'u'llah Khan. He was then living in Samarqand and heard of the faith through Mirza Abu'l-Fadl. The first Afghans inside of Afghanistan to become Baha'is would be in 1966.

An Afghan scholar that came across the Baha'i faith and interacted with its writings was Jamāl al-Dīn al-Afghānī.

=== ʻAbdu'l-Bahá's Tablets of the Divine Plan ===
ʻAbdu'l-Bahá wrote a series of letters, or tablets, to the followers of the religion in the United States in 1916-1917 suggesting Baháʼís take the religion to many places; these letters were compiled together in the book titled Tablets of the Divine Plan but were delayed in being presented in the United States until 1919 — after the end of World War I and the Spanish flu. These tablets were translated and presented by Mirza Ahmad Sohrab on April 4, 1919, and published in Star of the West magazine on December 12, 1919. One tablet says in part:

O that I could travel, even though on foot and in the utmost poverty, to these regions, and, raising the call of Yá Baháʼu'l-Abhá in cities, villages, mountains, deserts and oceans, promote the divine teachings! This, alas, I cannot do. How intensely I deplore it! Please God, ye may achieve it.… …if some teachers go to other islands and other parts, such as the continent of Australia, New Zealand, Tasmania, also to Japan, Asiatic Russia, Korea, French Indochina, Siam, Straits Settlements, India, Ceylon and Afghanistan, most great results will be forthcoming.

In the late 1930s Shoghi Effendi, then head of the religion, urged the Persian Baháʼís to send a pioneer to Afghanistan and a young Persian educated in India, 'Ali-Muhammad Nabílí went sometime 1938-40 "for the purposes of commerce." Other pioneers failed to remain during the period of the World Wars, however a Baháʼí Local Spiritual Assembly was elected in 1948 in Kabul.

== After the World Wars ==
By 1963, the Assembly of Kabul had lost assembly status. The Assembly of Kabul was next elected in 1969 and the first National Spiritual Assembly was elected in 1972. There were an estimated 400 Baháʼís in mid 1970s, and 4 assemblies in 1973.

=== Soviet invasion ===
Following the Soviet invasion of Afghanistan in 1979 bringing with it the Soviet policy of religious oppression, the Baháʼís, strictly adhering to their principle of obedience to legal government, abandoned its administration. Waves of refugees left in 1979 and some returned after 1990. The World Christian Encyclopedia records about 19,500 Afghan Baháʼís in 1990 and 23,075 in 2000. A new assembly was elected in 1995 in Mazar-e Sharif.

A number of Baháʼís were arrested and imprisoned for fourteen months.

=== Taliban ===
In 1998, when the Taliban authorities in Afghanistan arrested many Baháʼís, many began to flee to Pakistan. Many Afghan Baháʼís fled during the 2000-2001 period of Taliban rule. Following the 2001 fall of the Taliban, many Afghan Baháʼís have returned. In 2007 the US government estimated the Baháʼí population under the Taliban had fallen to about 400 - 300 of which were in Kabul.

== Recent developments ==
Estimates of the population of Baháʼís have varied widely - the World Christian Encyclopedia records about 19,500 Afghan Baháʼís in 1990 and 23,075 in 2000. However the Association of Religion Data Archives (relying on the World Christian Encyclopedia) estimated some 15,300 Baháʼís were again present in Afghanistan in 2005 and 16,541 in 2010. Most recently a 2007 report from the US State Department indicated that there are only 400 Baháʼís in Afghanistan, mostly concentrated in Kabul. According to the US State Department, in 2007 the General Directorate of Fatwas and Accounts under the Supreme Court issued a ruling on the status of the Baháʼí Faith, declaring it to be distinct from Islam and a form of blasphemy, affirmed that all Muslims who convert to the religion were apostates from Islam, declared all followers of the religion to be infidels and hazards the status of marriages of Baháʼís. Although the Supreme Court ruling would impact Afghan Bahai'is, it would be unlikely to affect foreign-national Bahai'is. In 2008, 50 people from Afghanistan traveled to India for a regional conference held in New Delhi called for by the Universal House of Justice.

== See also ==
- Religion in Afghanistan
- History of Afghanistan
- Persecution of Baháʼís
