= Christianity in Afghanistan =

Christians have historically comprised a small community in Afghanistan. The total number of Christians in Afghanistan is currently estimated to be between 15,000 and 20,000 according to International Christian Concern. Almost all Afghan Christians are converts from Islam. The Pew Research Center estimates that 40,000 Afghan Christians were living in Afghanistan in 2010. The Islamic Republic of Afghanistan did not recognize any Afghan citizen as being a Christian, with the exception of many expatriates (although, Rula Ghani, the country's First Lady from 2014 until 2021, is a Maronite Christian from Lebanon). Christians of Muslim background communities can be found in Afghanistan, estimated between 500-8,000, or between 10,000 to 12,000.

== Current status ==
=== Taliban Rule ===
Afghanistan was number one on Open Doors’ 2022 World Watch List, an annual ranking of the 50 countries where Christians face the most extreme persecution. In 2023 the country was ranked number 9; this was mainly due to the Taliban focusing on politics rather than non-Muslims.

After the Taliban retook control of the country in August 2021, the USCIRF warned that Christians in the country were in "extreme danger." Many fled and sought asylum, while the few Christians left in the country reported that they were in hiding from Taliban sweeps. The Taliban falsely claims that there are "no Christians" remaining in Afghanistan.

=== Closet Christians ===
Despite societal restrictions, many sources claim that there is a secret underground community of Afghan Christians living in Afghanistan. The US Department of State has stated that estimates of the size of this group range from 500 to 8,000 individuals. However, estimates of the size of the Afghan Christian community in Afghanistan are not reliable. Due to Afghanistan's hostile legal environment, Afghan Christians secretly practice their faith in private homes. The complete Bible is available online in Pashto, in the Yusufzai dialect.

=== Christian converts ===
There are a number of Afghan Christians (both converts and their descendants) who live outside Afghanistan, including Christian communities in India, the United States, the United Kingdom, Canada, Austria, Finland, and Germany.

== History ==
=== The Apostle Thomas and early Christianity ===
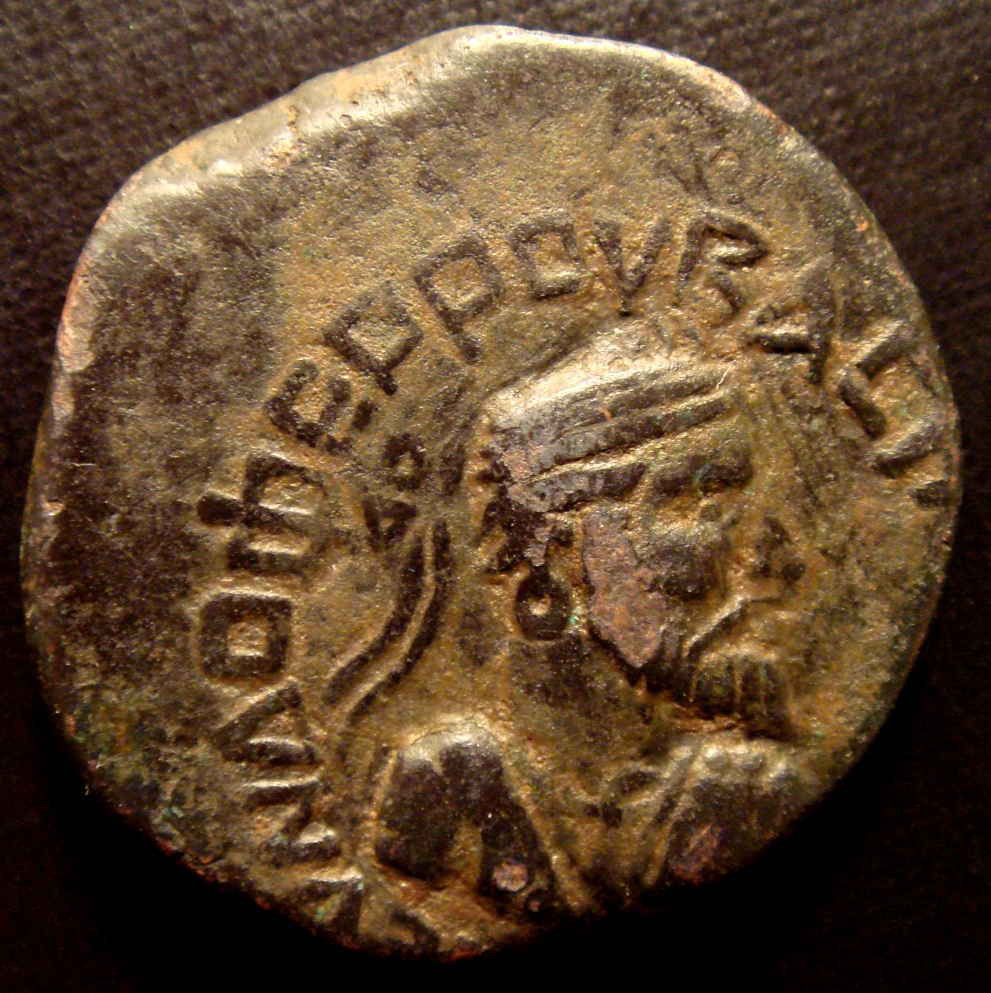
According to tradition, the Indo-Parthian king Gondophares was evangelised by the Apostle Thomas, who continued on to southern India, and possibly as far as Malaysia or China.

According to the Acts of the Apostles (Acts 2:9) in the Bible ethnic Jews and converts to Judaism from the Parthian Empire (which included parts of western Afghanistan) were present at Pentecost. According to Eusebius' record, the apostles Thomas and Bartholomew were assigned to Parthia.

A legend that is contained in the apocryphal Gospel of Thomas and other ancient documents suggests that Saint Thomas preached in Bactria, an ancient region in Central Asia that was located on flat land which straddles modern-day northern Afghanistan. An early third-century Syriac work known as the Acts of Thomas connects the apostle's ministry with two kings, one in the north and the other in the south. According to the Acts, Thomas was at first reluctant to accept this mission, but the Lord appeared to him in a night vision and compelled him to accompany an Indian merchant, Abbanes (or Habban), to his native place in northwest India. There, Thomas found himself in the service of the Indo-Parthian (Southern Afghanistan, Pakistan, and Northern India) King, Gondophares. The Apostle's ministry resulted in many conversions throughout the kingdom, including the king and his brother.

Bardaisan, writing in about 196, speaks of Christians throughout Media, Parthia, and Bactria and, according to Tertullian (c.160–230), there were already a number of bishoprics within the Persian Empire by 220. By the time of the establishment of the Second Persian Empire (AD 226), there were bishops of the Church of the East in northwest India, Afghanistan, and Baluchistan, with laymen and clergy alike engaging in missionary activity.

=== The Church of the East ===
In 409, the Church of the East (also sometimes called the Nestorian Church) received state recognition from King Yazdegerd I (reigned 399–409), of the Iranian Sassanid Empire which ruled what is now Afghanistan from 224 to 579.

In 424, Bishop Afrid of Sakastan, an area covering southern Afghanistan including Zaranj and Kandahar, attended the Synod of Dadyeshu. This synod was one of the most important councils of the Church of the East and determined that there would be no appeal of their disciplinary or theological problems to any other power, especially not to any church council in the Roman Empire.

The year 424 also marks the establishment of a bishop in Herat. In the 6th century, Herat was seen as a Metropolitan See the Apostolic Church of the East, and from the 9th century Herat was also the see of the Syriac Orthodox Metropolitan. The significance of the Christian community in Herat can be seen in that till today there is a district outside of the city named Injil, The Arabic/Dari/Pashto word for Gospel. The Christian community was present in Herat until at least 1310.

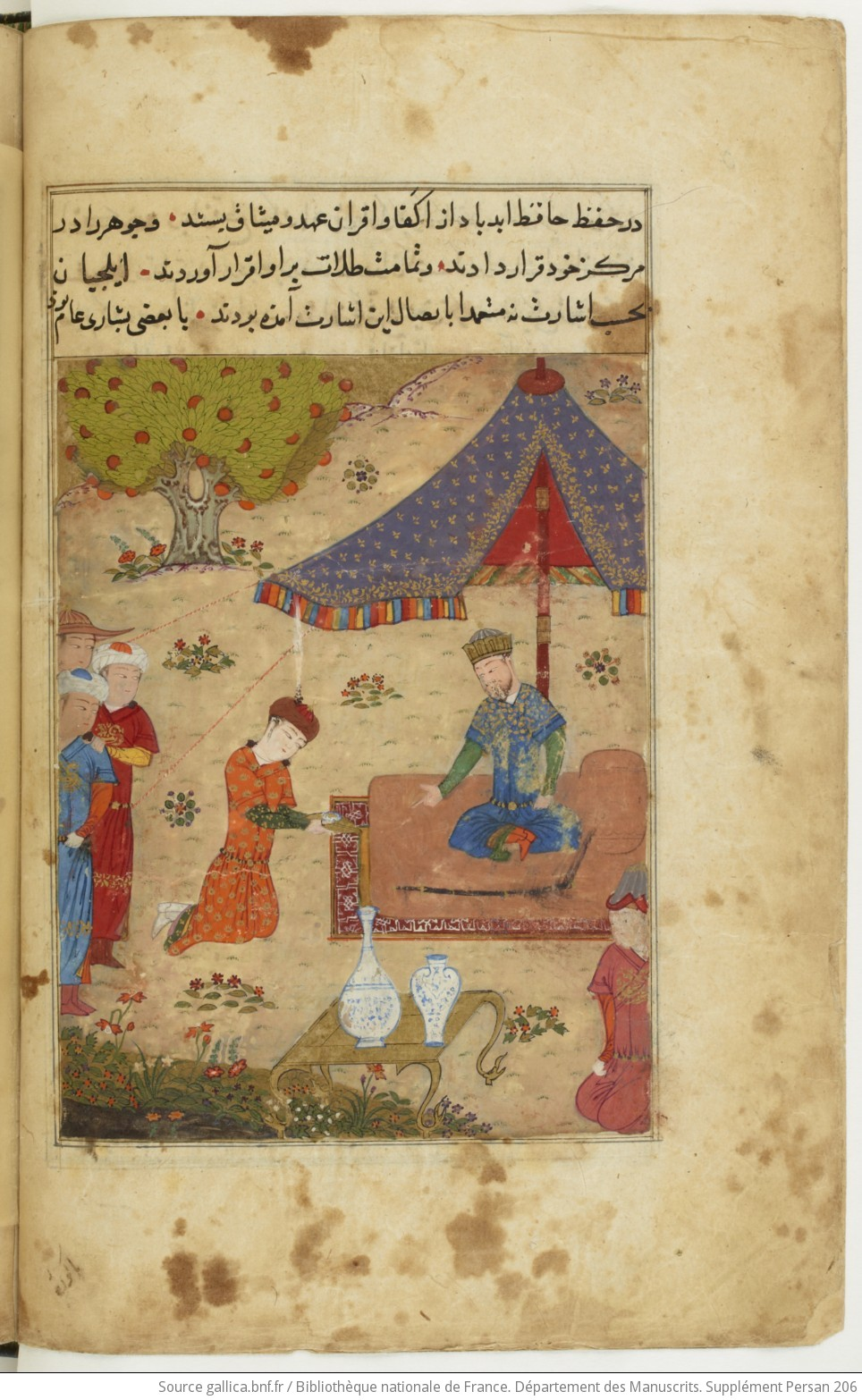
Tekuder, who was a Christian convert to Islam, receives an embassy. From the Tarikh-i Jahangushay-i Juvaini by Ata-Malik Juvayni.

The Apostolic Church of the East established bishops in nine cities in Afghanistan including Herat (424–1310), Farah (544–1057), Zaranj (544), Bushanj (585), Badghis (585) Kandahar, and Balkh. There are also ruins of a Nestorian convent from the 6th–7th centuries a short distance from Panj, Tajikistan on the north bank of the Amu Darya very close to the Afghan border, near Kunduz. The complex was discovered and identified by Soviet archeologists in 1967. It consists of dozens of small rooms carved into a rock formation.

Ahmed Tekuder, also known as Sultan Ahmad (reigned 1282–1284) was the sultan of the Ilkhan Empire, a Mongol Empire that stretched from eastern Turkey to Pakistan and covered most of Afghanistan. Tekuder was born Nicholas Tekuder Khan as a Nestorian Christian; however, Tekuder later embraced Islam and changed his name to Ahmed Tekuder. When Tekuder assumed the throne in 1282, he turned the Ilkhan empire into a sultanate. Tekudar zealously propagated his new faith and sternly required his ranking offices to do the same. The Ilkhan Empire ultimately adopted Islam as a state religion in 1295. The Church of the East was almost completely eradicated across Afghanistan and Persia during the reign of Timur (1336–1405).

=== Early Jesuit explorers ===
In 1581 and 1582 respectively, the Jesuit and Spanish Montesserat and the Portuguese Bento de Góis were warmly welcomed by the Islamic Emperor Akbar, but there was no lasting presence by the Jesuits in the country.

=== The Armenian Apostolic Church ===
There were Armenian merchants living in Kabul as early as 1667 who were in contact with the Jesuits in Mughal (modern day India). It is unclear if these Armenian merchants were Christians but their presence suggests an Armenian community in Kabul in the 17th century. Kabul was under the ecclesiastical jurisdiction of the Armenian Apostolic Church Perso-Indian diocese in New Julfa, Esfahan (modern day Iran), which sent Armenian priests to the community; however, no Armenian priest came after 1830.

In 1755, Jesuit missionaries to Lahore Joseph Tiefenthaler reported that Sultan Ahmad Shah Bahadur took several Armenian gunmakers from Lahore to Kabul. Anglican missionary Joseph Wolff preached to their descendants in Kabul in Persian in 1832; by his account, the community numbered about 23 people. In 1839, when Lord Keane marched to Kabul, the Chaplain, the Rev. G. Pigott, baptised two of the children at the Armenian church. And in 1842, the Rev. J. N. Allen, Chaplain to General William Nott's force, baptized three others.

The only reported baptism of an ethnic Afghan in the Armenian Church was said to be a robber who broke into the church through the roof and fell three times while attempting to leave with the valuable silver vessels stored there. When he was discovered, he begged for mercy and later asked to be baptized. The Armenian church building near Bala Hissar was destroyed during the Second Anglo-Afghan War by British troops; the community received compensation from the British Foreign and Commonwealth Office for their loss, but the church was never rebuilt.

As late as 1870, British reports showed 18 Armenian Christians remaining in Kabul. In 1896, Abdur Rahman Khan, Emir of Afghanistan, even sent a letter to the Armenian community at Calcutta, India (now Kolkata), asking that they send ten or twelve families to Kabul to "relieve the loneliness" of their fellow Armenians, whose numbers had continued to dwindle. However, despite an initial reply of interest, in the end, none of the Armenians of Calcutta accepted the offer. The following year, the final remnants of the Armenians were expelled after a letter from Ottoman Sultan Abdul Hamid II to the Afghan ruler questioning the loyalty of the Armenians.

The Armenians of Kabul took refuge in Peshawar. These refugees carried their religious books and ancient manuscripts with them. An article on this issue in the Englishman (Calcutta) dated 11 February 1907 stated: "These people in the time of the late Ameer Abdul Rahman had dwindled down to ten families. They were, for reasons unknown, banished to Peshawar and brought down with them a collection of manuscripts said to be of immense antiquity. Indeed, they are so old that none of the families possessing them are able to read them. In any case an examination by experts of the manuscripts now said to be in Peshawar, should yield some valuable results. The families themselves are unaware of the history of the first settlement in Kabul, except that it dates back to the very earliest times." Armenian Archbishop Sahak Ayvadian, after this publication went to Peshawar for a pastoral visit to these Armenians as well as to examine the books and manuscripts. On his return to Calcutta he presented some books to the Armenian Church Library, which he had obtained from the refugees.

=== 20th century onwards ===
Until 2021, when all minority religious institutions ceased to be recognized, the only legally recognized church in Afghanistan was within the compound of the Italian embassy. Italy was the first country to recognize Afghanistan's independence in 1919, and the Afghan government asked how it could thank Italy. Rome requested the right to build a Catholic chapel, which was being requested by international technicians then living in the Afghan capital. A clause giving Italy the right to build a chapel within its embassy was included in the Italian-Afghan treaty of 1921, and that same year the Barnabites arrived to start giving pastoral care. The actual pastoral work began in 1933 when the chapel international technicians had asked for was built. In the 1950s, the simple cement chapel was finished.

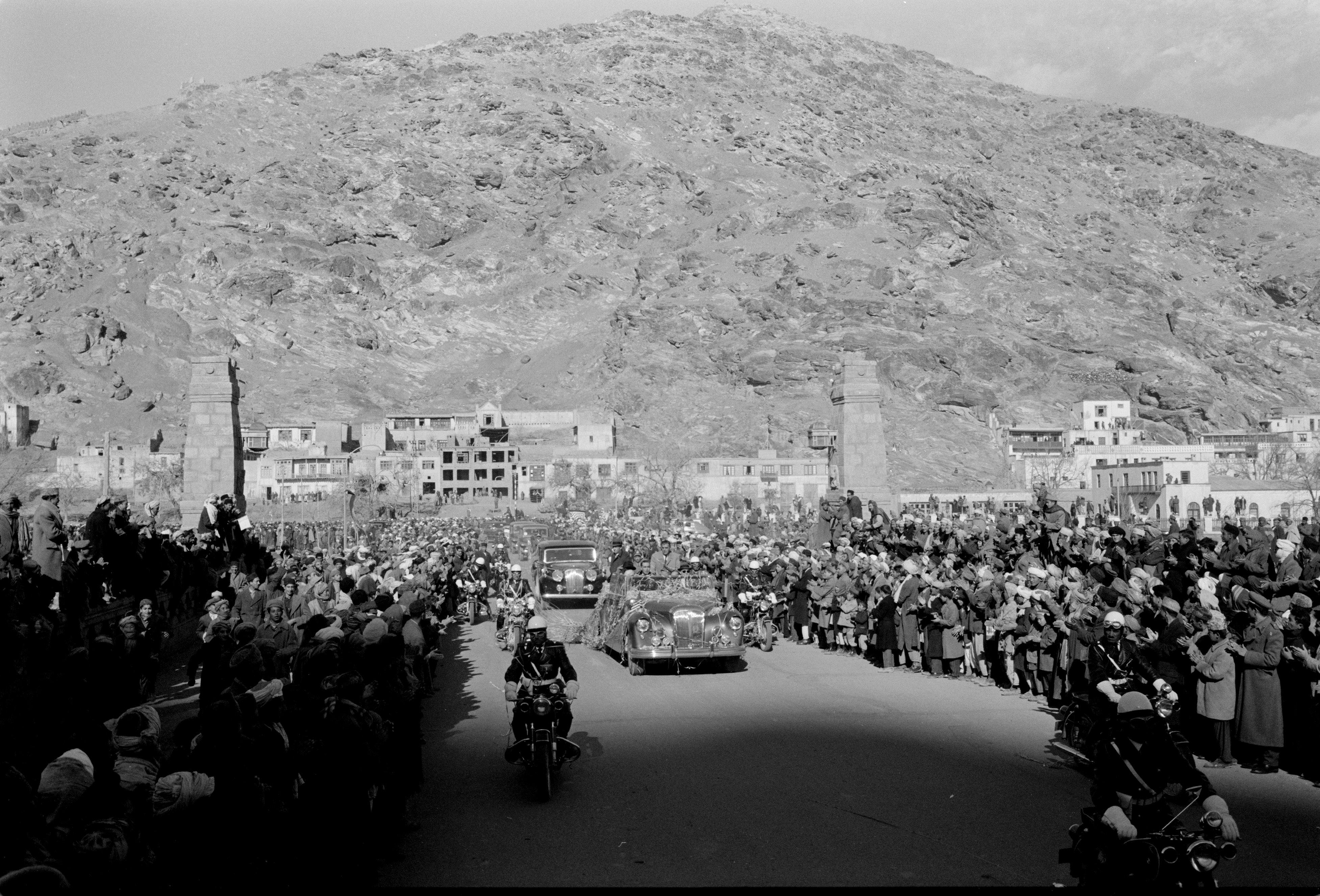
Motorcade for President Eisenhower's visit to Kabul, Afghanistan. United States President Dwight D. Eisenhower visited Afghanistan in 1959

From 1990 to 1994, Father Giuseppe Moretti served as the only Catholic priest in Afghanistan, but he was forced to leave in 1994 after being hit with shrapnel when the Italian embassy was attacked during the civil war, and he had to return to Italy. After 1994, the Little Sisters of Jesus were the only Catholic religious workers who were allowed to remain in Afghanistan, because they had been there since 1955, and their work was renowned. An official from President Mohammed Najibullah's government in 1992 visited Moretti for planning a new church compound, but nothing came out of it as Najibullah was shortly afterwards deposed by the rebels during the conflict.

In 1959, US President Dwight D. Eisenhower visited Afghanistan. The Islamic Center of Washington had recently been built in Washington, DC, for the Muslim diplomats there and President Eisenhower requested permission from King Zahir Shah to construct a Protestant church in Kabul on a reciprocal basis for the use of the diplomatic corp and expatriate community in Afghanistan. Christians from all around the world contributed to its construction. At its dedication, the cornerstone which was carved in Afghan alabaster marble read: "To the glory of God 'Who loves us and has freed us from our sins by His blood' this building is dedicated as 'a house of prayer for all nations' in the reign of H.M. Zahir Shah, May 17, 1970 A.D., 'Jesus Christ Himself being the Chief Cornerstone'." However, the church building was destroyed on 17 July 1973, during the republican coup d'état by Mohammed Daoud Khan against the monarchy. Since then, no place of worship has been authorized for Protestant Christians.

Christians were persecuted after the Taliban came to power in the mid-1990s. The number of converts to Christianity increased as the U.S. presence increased after the fall of the Taliban in 2001. Most of the Christian converts lived in urban areas, so the threat from the Taliban was minimal. But many Christian converts started fleeing Afghanistan (mostly to India) around 2005, fearing their identities might become public. A 2015 study estimated some 3,300 believers in Christ from a Muslim background living in the country.

Under the Islamic Republic of Afghanistan, the Constitution of Afghanistan allowed the practice of religions other than Islam, as long as it was within the legal framework of Islamic laws and did not threaten the Islamic religion. However Muslims who converted to Christianity were subjected to societal and official pressure, which may lead to confiscation of property, imprisonment, or death. "Christian minority has never been known or registered here,” Inamullah Samangani, a Taliban spokesman told VOA in 2022. He further added “There are only Sikh and Hindu religious minority in Afghanistan that are completely free and safe to practice their religion.”

==== Anti-Christian incidents since 2001 ====
- On 5 August 2001, 24 workers for the NGO Shelter Now International were arrested by the ruling Taliban. The charity built homes for refugees and the poor. 16 were Afghans and 8 were westerners. The workers were eventually freed after a rescue mission in November 2001. The westerners had been six women and two men, from Germany, America, and Australia. The staff of Shelter Now had been accused of converting Afghan Muslims to Christianity.
- In 2002, Afghanistan adopted a new press law that contained a sanction against the publication of "matters contrary to the principles of Islam or offensive to other religions and sects."
- In 2003, Mullah Dadullah (Pashto: ملا دادالله آخوند), a top Taliban commander, said that they would continue to fight until the "Jews and Christians, all foreign crusaders" were expelled from Afghanistan.
- In January 2004, Afghanistan adopted a new constitution that provides for the freedom of non-Muslim religious groups to exercise their faith and declares that the state will abide by the UN Charter, international treaties, international conventions, and the Universal Declaration of Human Rights. However, the constitution does not extend explicit protections for the right to freedom of religion or belief to every individual, particularly to individual Muslims, the overwhelming majority of Afghanistan's population, or minority religious communities.
- In 2005 President Hamid Karzai showed his respects by attending the funeral of Pope John Paul II.
- In February 2006, an Afghan Christian, Abdul Rahman (Persian: عبدالرحمن) (born 1965) was arrested in February 2006 and threatened with the death penalty for converting to Christianity. On 26 March 2006, under heavy pressure from foreign governments, the court returned his case to prosecutors, citing "investigative gaps" and suspicions that he was 'mentally unbalanced'. He was released from prison to his family on the night of 27 March. On 29 March, Abdul Rahman arrived in Italy after the Italian government offered him asylum.
- On 19 July 2007, 23 South Korean missionaries were captured and held hostage by members of the Taliban while passing through Ghazni Province. Two male hostages were executed before the deal was reached between the Taliban and the South Korean government. The group, composed of sixteen women and seven men, was captured while traveling from Kandahar to Kabul by bus on a mission sponsored by the Saemmul Presbyterian Church. Of the 23 hostages captured, two men, Bae Hyeong-gyu, a 42-year-old South Korean pastor of Saemmul Church, and Shim Seong-min, a 29-year-old South Korean man, were executed on 25 and 30 July, respectively. Later, with negotiations making progress, two women, Kim Gyeong-ja and Kim Ji-na were released on 13 August and the remaining 19 hostages on 29 and 30 August.
- In September 2008, the Afghan parliament passed a new media law that prohibits works and materials that are contrary to the principles of Islam, works and materials offensive to other religions and sects, and propagation of religions other than Islam.
- In October 2008 Gayle Williams (1974? – 20 October 2008), an aid worker for SERVE Afghanistan of joint British and South African nationality, was shot on her way to work in Kabul by two men on a motorbike. Zabiullah Mujahid, a spokesman for the Taliban, claimed responsibility for her death and said she had been killed "because she was working for an organization which was preaching Christianity in Afghanistan".
- In May 2009, it was made public that Christian groups had published Bibles in the Pashtun language and the Dari language, intended to convert Afghans from Islam to Christianity. The Bibles were sent to soldiers at the Bagram Air Base. American military authorities report that Bible distribution was not official policy, and when a chaplain became aware of the soldiers' plans the Bibles were confiscated and, eventually, burned.
- In March 2010 the remaining buildings on the leased property where the 1970 built Protestant church had stood were destroyed. The buildings had been unofficially used by the international Christian community as a meeting place. The 99-year lease of the property which was paid for in gold in 1970 was not honored by the Afghan courts.
- In June 2010 Noorin TV, a small Afghan television station, showed footage of men it said were reciting Christian prayers in Dari and being baptized. The television station said the men were Afghans who had converted to Christianity. Two humanitarian agencies, Norwegian Church Aid and Church World Service of the United States, were suspended after it was suggested in this report that they had converted Afghan Muslims to Christianity. Later Noorin TV confirmed that there was no evidence against the two agencies and that they had been named because of the word "church" in their names. The report sparked anti-Christian protests in Kabul and in Mazar-e Sharif. In parliament, Abdul Sattar Khawasi, a deputy of the lower house, called for Muslim converts to Christianity to be executed and Qazi Nazir Ahmad, a lawmaker from the western province of Herat, said killing a converted Muslim was "not a crime". One of the men shown in the video, among the 25 Christians arrested was Said Musa (also spelled Sayed Mussa), an Afghan Red Cross worker, who was later sentenced to death for converting to Christianity.
- On 5 August 2010, ten members of the International Assistance Mission Nuristan Eye Camp team were killed in Kuran wa Munjan District of Badakhshan Province in Afghanistan. The team was attacked as it was returning from Nuristan to Kabul. One team member was spared, the rest of the team were killed immediately. Those killed were six Americans, two Afghans, one Briton and one German. Both Hizb-e Islami and the Taliban initially claimed responsibility for the attack, accusing the doctors of proselytism and spying. These claims were later refuted by Taliban leaders in Nuristan and Badakhshan, who stated that they had confirmed the dead were bona-fide aid workers, condemned the killings as murder, and offered their condolences to the families of those killed. The attack was the deadliest strike against foreign aid workers in the Afghanistan war. The killings underscored the suspicion Christian-affiliated groups face from some Afghans and government opponents and the wider risks faced by aid workers in the country.
- On 9 August 2010, two Afghans and two aid workers were arrested for preaching Christianity in western Herat province. Two NGO workers were deported from the country and the Afghans were kept for longer period. After long negotiations, the government freed them in Kabul.
- In November 2010, Another man, Shoaib Assadullah Musawi, was jailed in the northern city of Mazar-i-Sharif after being accused of giving the New Testament to a friend, who then turned him in. Shoaib Assadullah was freed from prison on 30 March 2011 and on 14 April 2011 received a passport and left Afghanistan.
- In February 2011, International Christian Concern lauded the release of Said Musa (also spelled Sayed Mussa) an Afghan man who had been imprisoned for nine months for converting to Christianity.

== Freedom of religion after 2021 ==
The Taliban took back power in August 2021. In 2022, a report in 2022 noted that they had stated that the country is an Islamic emirate whose laws and governance must be consistent with sharia law. Non-Muslim minorities reported continued harassment from Muslims, while Baha’is and Christians continued to live in constant fear of exposure. In 2023, it was reported that Freedom House rated Afghanistan’s religious freedom as 1 out of 4. It was also reported in the same year that violations against minorities had increased after September 2021. In particular many minorities fled to neighbouring countries such as Iran and Pakistan.

== See also ==
- Islam and other religions
- Christianity and Islam
- Catholic Church in Afghanistan
- History of the Jews in Afghanistan
- Islam in Afghanistan
- Religion in Afghanistan
- Freedom of religion in Afghanistan

== Notes ==
=== Sources ===
- Hughes, Thomas P. (1893), "Twenty Years on the Afghan Frontier", The New York Independent, 45: 455–456
- Seth, Mesrovb Jacob (1992), "Chapter XVI: Armenians at Kabul – A Christian colony in Afghanistan", Armenians in India, from the earliest times to the present day: a work of original research, Asian Educational Services, pp. 207–224, ISBN 978-81-206-0812-2
