= Abdul Rahman (convert) =

Afghan citizen (born 1965)

- عبدالرحمن
- Born: 1965 (age 60–61); Kabul, Afghanistan
- Known for: Converting to Christianity from Islam
- Criminal charges: Apostasy
- Criminal penalty: Capital punishment
- Children: 2

Abdul Rahman (Dari: عبدالرحمن; born 1965) is an Afghan man whose arrest and trial in February 2006 sparked widespread controversy among the international community. Abdul Rahman had been arrested by Afghan authorities for apostasy and subsequently threatened with the death penalty. He had converted to Christianity from Islam while providing medical assistance to Afghan refugees in Peshawar, Pakistan. On 26 March 2006, under heavy pressure from foreign governments, the Afghan court returned his case to prosecutors, citing "investigative gaps"; Abdul Rahman was released from prison and remanded to his family on the night of 27 March. On 29 March, Abdul Rahman arrived in Italy after being offered asylum by the Italian government. Representatives within the Afghan government and many Afghan citizens continued to call for Abdul Rahman's execution, and his wife divorced him shortly after his conversion, leading to an unsuccessful custody battle for their two children.

The case became a cause célèbre internationally, and particularly throughout the Western world. Harsh condemnation came from the United States and the United Kingdom, both of which were the world's leading donors of international aid to Afghanistan at the time. The Afghan government's integrity was called into question, as it had recently been established under the aegis of the War in Afghanistan, shortly after an American-led military coalition overthrew the country's Taliban government.

== Early life ==
Abdul Rahman was born in 1965.

In 1990, while he was working as a staff member for a Catholic non-governmental aid group which was providing medical assistance to Afghan refugees in Peshawar, Pakistan, he learned about Christianity and he was subsequently baptized into the Roman Catholic Church. After his conversion, he adopted the biblical name Joel.

In 1993, he moved to Germany and later, he unsuccessfully sought asylum in Belgium before he was deported to Afghanistan in 2002, after the fall of the Taliban government.

Abdul Rahman's wife divorced him because of his conversion to Catholicism. In the ensuing custody battle over the couple's two daughters, who had been raised by Abdul Rahman's parents during his absence, the mother's family raised the issue of his religion as grounds for their denial of his custody.

When he returned to Afghanistan, he was disowned by his parents, who stated: "Because he has converted from Islam to another religion we don't want him in our house" and "Abdul Rahman wanted to change the ethics of my children and family. He is not going in the right direction. I have thrown him out of my house", while his daughters said that "He behaves badly with us and we were threatened and disgraced by him. He has no job and has never given me a stitch of clothing or a crust of bread. Just his name as a father" and "He said he was my father but he hasn't behaved like a father since he came back to Afghanistan. He threatens us and we are all afraid of him and he doesn't believe in the religion of Islam."

== Arrest and trial ==
In February 2006, members of his family reported him to the police. He was arrested after police discovered that he possessed a Bible. After his arrest, he was unable to find a lawyer in Kabul willing to represent him. Authorities barred attempts by the Associated Press news agency to see him.

Article 130 of the 2004-2021 Constitution of Afghanistan enabled prosecutors to charge him for apostasy "in accordance with the Hanafi jurisprudence". The text of the article says:

In cases under consideration, the courts shall apply provisions of this Constitution as well as other laws. If there is no provision in the Constitution or other laws about a case, the courts shall, in pursuance of Hanafi jurisprudence, and, within the limits set by this Constitution, rule in a way that attains justice in the best manner.

Prosecutors asked for the death penalty for Abdul Rahman, calling him a "microbe". Prosecutor Abdul Wasi demanded his repentance and called him a traitor: "He should be cut off and removed from the rest of Muslim society and should be killed." The Afghan attorney general was quoted as saying that Abdul Rahman should be hanged.

Abdul Rahman's judicial proceedings, which began on 16 March and became widely known in the international press on 19 March, were overseen by three judges in the public security tribunal of Kabul's primary court. Ansarullah Mawlawizadah, the chief judge in the case, said that Abdul Rahman would be asked to reconsider his conversion: "We will invite him again because the religion of Islam is one of tolerance. We will ask him if he has changed his mind. If so we will forgive him."

Ansarullah Mawlafizada also said "the Prophet Muhammad has said several times that those who convert from Islam should be killed if they refuse to come back, Islam is a religion of peace, tolerance, kindness and integrity. That is why we have told him if he regrets what he did, then we will forgive him".

The judge added more conditions: "If [he] does not repent, you will all be witness to the sort of punishment he will face."

Even though he was facing a possible death sentence, Abdul Rahman held firm to his convictions: "They want to sentence me to death and I accept it ... I am a Christian, which means I believe in the Trinity ... I believe in Jesus Christ."

== Efforts by Afghan Christians ==
While Abdul Rahman was on trial, a number of Afghan Christians worked to bring the attention of the international media towards the suffering of the Afghan Christians and especially Abdul Rahman.

=== Mental fitness to stand trial ===
The Afghan Embassy in Washington, D.C., announced on March 22 that the country's judicial system was evaluating Abdul Rahman's mental fitness. Moayuddin Baluch, a religious adviser to President Hamid Karzai confirmed that Abdul Rahman would undergo a psychological examination. Judge Mawlawizadah stated that since Rahman refused to repent then his mental state was being examined. If he was found to be mentally unfit, the case would be dismissed.

An Afghanistan state prosecutor named Sarinwal Zamari said of Abdul Rahman in an interview with the Associated Press on March 22, 2006, "We think he could be mad. He is not a normal person. He doesn't talk like a normal person. Doctors must examine him. If he is mentally unfit, definitely Islam has no claim to punish him. He must be forgiven. The case must be dropped." Other sources said Abdul Rahman is "perennially jobless and mentally unbalanced".

Prosecutor Abdul Wasei said he doubted claims regarding Abdul Rahman's mental instability. "I did not see any kind of mental problem in this case", he said. Wasei said that Abdul Rahman, when asked about his mental health, insisted that it was fine. "I am O.K., you can prosecute me, I can answer your questions", Wasei said Abdul Rahman told him.

Diplomats said that the Afghan government was "desperately searching for a way to drop the case" by declaring Abdul Rahman mentally unfit to stand trial.

The court also raised questions about Abdul Rahman's nationality. Abdul Rahman had lived abroad, in Germany, Greece and Belgium. If he had acquired dual nationality, it was argued, the status of his case could change.

There were various opinions regarding Abdul Rahman being declared unfit for trial. Critics said that declaring him insane would not solve what they regarded as a constitutional flaw that allows prosecution under Islamic law. An editorial in The Washington Times wrote that declaring him mentally unfit is "a manufactured loophole" which would enable the Afghan government "to back down to avoid a disastrous internal and diplomatic crisis. This solution, such as it is, won't resolve the underlying discrepancy in Afghanistan's constitution." A New York Times editorial echoed these sentiments, saying that declaring Abdul Rahman mentally incompetent was a way for the Afghan government to "avoid the mess" and "that would be a cheap trick because the law would remain on the books."

In France, Marianne magazine stated Western critics of the case might not be satisfied if the Kabul court avoided the death sentence for Abdul Rahman by declaring him insane and unfit for trial. "If he is not tried, he will probably end up in a psychiatric hospital, which for a man of sound mind is sometimes worse than death."

=== Release ===
On March 24, 2006, Afghan authorities announced that they were considering releasing Abdul Rahman soon. A special government meeting on his case was held on the following day during which President Hamid Karzai conferred with several Cabinet ministers for a way to free him without angering the country's powerful conservative Muslim clerics who have called for Abdul Rahman's execution. After this meeting an unnamed senior government official said there is a "strong possibility" that Abdul Rahman would be freed on Sunday the 26th. However the prosecutor dismissed any claims that Abdul Rahman was to be released. Later on Sunday the judge made the following statement: "The case, because of some technical as well as legal flaws and shortcomings, has been referred back to the prosecutor's office".

Clerics question President Karzai's authority to order Abdul Rahman's release. Cleric Khoja Ahmad Sediqi, a member of the Supreme Court in Afghanistan, warned against interfering with the courts, saying that "The Qur'an is very clear and the words of our prophet are very clear. There can only be one outcome: death. If Karzai releases him, it will play into the hands of our enemy and there could be an uprising."

On March 28, 2006, the AP reported that Abdul Rahman had been released. The announcement came after the United Nations said he had appealed for asylum outside Afghanistan.

On March 29, 2006, Prime Minister of Italy Silvio Berlusconi announced that his cabinet had approved Abdul Rahman's asylum plea and Abdul Rahman had already arrived in Italy.

== Response in Afghanistan ==
=== Government officials ===
Agence France Presse (AFP) quoted an unidentified Afghan official as saying that President Hamid Karzai has personally interfered in Abdul Rahman's case to secure the convert's release. "The president is personally working to resolve it peacefully. There is a way out of it", said the official. "I believe it'll take one or two days."

Former Afghanistan Foreign Minister Dr. Abdullah said during a press conference with US Under Secretary for Political Affairs R. Nicholas Burns, "I know that it is a very sensitive issue and we know the concerns of the American people. In fact, in our embassy we received hundreds of messages of such kind. As far as I understand the nature of the case has been that the wife of the gentleman has registered a lawsuit against her husband. And then the Government of Afghanistan has nothing to do in it. It's a legal and judicial case. But I hope that through our constitutional process there will be a satisfactory result out of that process." He also stated: "Every time we have a case it is like an alarm. These contradictions [between freedom of religion and sharia] will not go away with one or two cases."

Ansarullah Mawlawizadah announced international pressure will not affect his rulings in the case, saying: "There is no direct pressure on our court so far, but if it happens we will consider it as an interference. We have a constitution and law here. Nobody has the right to put pressure on us." In an interview to AFP, Mawlawizadah confirmed his position: "We have nothing to do with diplomatic issues. We'll do our job independently." He says that he expects to rule in the case in the next several days.

=== Muslim clerics ===
After Abdul Rahman's arrest and after the subsequent outrage and criticism of the Afghan government, notable Afghan clerics spoke out against his possible release. Afghan clerics have denounced what they assert is interference with the autonomy of the Afghan courts by other countries as well as by President Hamid Karzai. Maulavi Habibullah told more than a thousand clerics and young people who gathered in Kabul that "Afghanistan does not have any obligation under international laws. The prophet says, when somebody changes religion, he must be killed." Many clerics have spoken out to the media saying that Abdul Rahman should receive the death penalty for apostasy.

Cleric Enayatullah Baligh, speaking at one of Kabul's main mosques said, "We respect all religions but we don't go into the British embassy or the American embassy to see what religion they are following. We won't let anyone interfere with our religion and he should be punished."

Ahmad Shah Ahmadzai, a prominent mujahidin leader and head of the Hizb-i-Iqtadar-i-Islami Afghanistan, and former acting prime minister in the government of Burhanuddin Rabbani before the Taliban came to power in 1996, said, "Regardless of the court decision [whether or not he is hanged], there is unanimous agreement by all religious scholars from the north to the south, the east to the west of Afghanistan, that Abdul Rahman should be executed. There is widespread dissent among the masses against the activities of Christian missionaries. These missions exploit the poverty of Afghan people and they pay them to convert. These activities will only translate into fierce reaction as Afghans do not tolerate anything against their religion. Since Abdul Rahman comes from Panjshir, people of the area are coming down to Kabul to show their dissent against him and demand that the court execute him."

Muslim cleric Abdul Raouf, a member of Afghanistan's main Islamic organization, the Afghan Ulama Council, stated "Rejecting Islam is insulting God. We will not allow God to be humiliated. This man must die." Raouf, who is described by the AP as "moderate", is quoted as saying: "Cut off his head!" and "We will call on the people to pull him into pieces so there's nothing left." Raouf said Abdul Rahman will only survive if he goes into exile. During his sermon at Herati Mosque on March 24, 2006, Raouf told around 150 worshippers that Abdul Rahman deserved death since he had "committed the greatest sin. God's way is the right way, and this man whose name is Abdul Rahman is an apostate."

Mirhossain Nasri, the top cleric at Hossainia Mosque, said "If he is allowed to live in the West, then others will claim to be Christian so they can too", he said. "We must set an example. ... He must be hanged."

Muslim cleric Mohammed Qasim who resides in the northern city of Mazari Sharif, said: "We don't care if the West drops its support for us. God will look after Afghanistan."

=== Afghan public ===
The BBC assesses that many members of the Afghan public are vocal in support of Abdul Rahman's execution, though it does not estimate if these are in the majority. "The courts should punish him and he should be put to death", said Kabul dweller Abdul Zahid Paymen. Mohammed Qadir agrees that he must be executed: "According to Islamic law he should be sentenced to death because Christianity is forbidden in our land". Abdul Rahman's neighbor remarked: "there is no way we are going to allow an Afghan to insult us by becoming Christian." Religious intellectual Shahnawaz Farooqui, speaking on Abdul Rahman's conversion, said "he will have to be executed ... If somebody at one point affirms the truth and then rejects it or denies it, it would jeopardize the whole paradigm of truth. This is such a big offense that the penalty can only be death. At the very most, some scholars argue that the person should be given time to rethink, and if he embraces Islam again, he will be forgiven."

== International reactions ==
=== Calls for Abdul Rahman's release ===
A number of Western countries and NGOs condemned his trial as a human rights violation and called for the release of the Afghan convert.

- Australia: Australian Prime Minister John Howard said Abdul Rahman's case was "appalling" and that "when [he] saw the report about this [he] felt sick literally. The idea that a person could be punished because of their religious belief and the idea they might be executed is just beyond belief."
- Canada: The Canadian government expressed concern, especially as the Canadian Forces had recently taken command of the coalition force in Kandahar province and the government was facing pressure to ensure the mission led to an open, democratic Afghanistan. Canadian Prime Minister Stephen Harper phoned Hamid Karzai and said in a written statement, "I phoned President Karzai personally yesterday to express our concern. He conveyed to me that we don't have to worry about any such eventual outcome".

Statements calling for Abdul Rahman's release were also issued by the Muslim Canadian Congress.

- European Union: Austrian Foreign Minister Ursula Plassnik, speaking on behalf of the European Union, said, "We will leave no stone unturned to protect the fundamental rights of Abdul Rahman and to save his life" (Austria held the presidency of the Council of the European Union at the time).
- Germany: German Chancellor Angela Merkel told reporters she had received assurances from Karzai in a telephone call that Abdul Rahman would not be sentenced to death.
- United Kingdom: The council of Church Society, the senior evangelical body of the Church of England, condemned the trial and called on all Christians to express their outrage at the injustice and to do what they could to prevent Abdul Rahman's death. The society also called on the British government to use all its influence in Afghanistan.
- Amnesty International called for Abdul Rahman's release, saying that he might be a "prisoner of conscience" and that "the charges against him should be dropped and if necessary he should be protected against any abuses within the community."
- United States: On March 22, 2006, Congressman Tom Lantos (D), wrote a letter to Hamid Karzai in which he said, "In a country where soldiers from all faiths, including Christianity, are dying in defense of your government, I find it outrageous that Mr. Rahman is being prosecuted and facing the death penalty for converting to Christianity." Following Lantos's lead a number of government officials protested Abdul Rahman's arrest. Notably, President George W. Bush spoke out against Abdul Rahman's arrest, saying, "It is deeply troubling that a country we helped liberate would hold a person to account because they chose a particular religion over another". White House spokesman Scott McClellan said Abdul Rahman's arrest and trial "clearly violates the universal freedoms that democracies around the world hold dear."

Secretary of State Condoleezza Rice appealed directly to President Hamid Karzai for a "favorable resolution", though she did not demand that the charges be dropped. Undersecretary of State for Political Affairs R. Nicholas Burns asked for the trial to be conducted with "transparency" and reminded Afghanistan that "people should be free to choose their religion."

The U.S. Islamic advocacy group Council on American-Islamic Relations called for Abdul Rahman's immediate release.

The Seventh-day Adventist Church urged that Abdul Rahman be released, and allowed to practice his religion freely.

The United States Commission on International Religious Freedom (USCIRF) wrote in a letter addressed to U.S. President George W. Bush on March 22, 2006 that: "On several previous occasions, the Commission has raised concern that the Afghan constitution's failure to include adequate guarantees of freedom of religion and expression for members of the country's majority Muslim community could lead to unjust criminal accusations of apostasy and blasphemy. With no guarantee of the right to religious freedom for all individuals, together with a judicial system instructed to enforce Islamic principles and Islamic law, the door is open for a harsh, unfair, or even abusive interpretation of religious orthodoxy to be officially imposed".

- Vatican City: Pope Benedict XVI urged the president of Afghanistan to pardon Abdul Rahman. asking "for respect for human rights sanctioned in the preamble of the new Afghan constitution".

=== Threats to cut off aid to Afghanistan ===
Germany, which is involved in the UN-mandated International Security Assistance force in Afghanistan and also heads an international effort improving Afghanistan's police force, has suggested that Afghanistan could potentially lose aid or technical support for reconstruction efforts depending on the outcome of Abdul Rahman's case. German Interior Minister Wolfgang Schäuble has stated "I highly support the idea that we make it clear to Afghanistan, in every way possible, that abiding by and protecting human rights, which Afghanistan is obliged to, includes [protecting the] freedom of religion." Schäuble also said, "We contribute a lot to rebuilding Afghanistan and towards its stability, so I truly believe that Afghanistan must realize that we insist upon the freedom of religion. You cannot punish people because they change their religion."

In response to Schäuble's comments, Afghan Economy Minister Amin Farhang said that the government in Kabul cannot stop donor countries from withholding aid or technical support, but consequences of such withdrawals would be worse for Western countries than Afghanistan. Farhang stated: "I think that politicians in the West, including in Germany, reacted very emotionally. It shouldn't be like that. There's a lack of information. And besides, while the situation hasn't been resolved and the final decision hasn't been made yet, they can't threaten to withdraw security forces or foreign aid. That amounts to blackmail." Farhang also said that Kabul is attempting to build democracy after the Taliban was forced from power by US forces in 2001, but that the right to convert from Islam to Christianity is too extreme for a traditional Islamic society such as Afghanistan which upholds the Islamic punishment for apostasy. He also stated: "Afghanistan cannot switch suddenly from one extreme to the other."

== See also ==
- Kamilia Shehata
- Cairo Declaration on Human Rights in Islam
- Islam and other religions
- Persecution of Christians
- Universal Declaration of Human Rights
