= Freedom of religion in Afghanistan =

Freedom of religion in Afghanistan changed during the Islamic Republic installment in 2002, following a U.S.-led invasion that displaced the former Taliban government.

Freedom of religion has changed again after the Taliban took back control in August 2021.

== Overview ==
The initial three articles of the Constitution of Afghanistan dated 23 January 2004, mandated:

1. Afghanistan shall be an Islamic Republic, independent, unitary, and indivisible state.
2. The sacred religion of Islam shall be the religion of the Islamic Republic of Afghanistan. Followers of other faiths shall be free within the bounds of law in the exercise and performance of their religious rights.
3. No law shall contravene the tenets and provisions of the holy religion of Islam in Afghanistan.

Article seven of the constitution commits the state to abide by the Universal Declaration of Human Rights (UDHR) and other international treaties and conventions to which the country is a party. Articles 18 and 19 of the UDHR, taken together, effectively declare that it is a universal human right to engage in religious proselytism.

In the past, small communities of Hindus, Sikhs, Jews, and Christians also lived in the country; most members of these communities have left. Even at their peak, these non-Muslim minorities constituted only one percent of the population. Almost all members of the country's small Hindu and Sikh population, which once numbered about 50,000, have emigrated or taken refuge abroad. Non-Muslims such as Hindus and Sikhs now number only in the hundreds, often working as traders. The few Christians and Jews who live in the country are mostly foreigners who are in the country to carry out relief work on behalf of foreign non-governmental organizations (NGOs).

== Freedom of Religion before November 2001 ==
=== History ===
The Taliban imposed its interpretation of Islamic law, establishing a "Ministry for the Promotion of Virtue and the Prevention of Vice" for purposes of enforcement. One of the Ministry's duties was to operate a body of religious police who enforced edicts on dress code, employment, access to medical care, behavior, religious practice, and expression. Persons found to be in violation of an edict were often subject to punishment meted out on the spot, which included beatings and detention.

The Taliban persecuted members of other Islamic sects as well as non-Muslims. Traditionally, Sunni Islam of the Hanafi school of jurisprudence has been the dominant form of Islam in Afghanistan. This school counts the Taliban among its followers. The Deoband madrassa (religious school) near Delhi, India, has been a source of influence for these Sunni for approximately 200 years. Most of the Taliban leadership attended Deobandi-influenced seminaries in Pakistan. The Deoband school has long sought to "purify" Islam by discarding supposedly un-Islamic accretions to the faith and reemphasizing the models established in the Qur'an and Hadith. Deobandi scholars often have opposed what they perceive as Western influences. Much of the population adheres to Deobandi-influenced Hanafi Sunnism, but a sizable minority adheres to a more mystical version of Hanafi Sunnism generally known as Sufism. Sufism centers on orders or brotherhoods that follow charismatic religious leaders.

The Shi'a, under the Taliban, were among the most economically disadvantaged groups in the country. An ethnic group known as the Hazara is predominantly Shi'a Muslim. There are also small numbers of Ismailis living in the central and northern parts of the country. Ismailis are Shi'a Muslims, but consider the Aga Khan their spiritual leader.

== Freedom of speech, including on religious matters ==
The Taliban prohibited free speech about religious issues or discussions that challenge orthodox Sunni Muslim views. Publishing and distribution of literature of any kind, including religious material, was rare. In 1998, television sets, videocassette recorders, videocassettes, audiocassettes, and satellite dishes were outlawed in order to enforce the prohibition. However, subsequent reports indicated that many persons in urban areas around the country continued to own such electronic devices despite the ban. The Taliban continues to prohibit music, movies, and television on religious grounds in areas that it still holds.

=== Religious discrimination ===
==== Discrimination against non-Muslims ====
According to Human Rights Watch (HRW), in September 1998, the Taliban issued decrees that forbade non-Muslims from building new places of worship but allowed them to worship at existing holy sites, criticizing Muslims and living in the same residence as Muslims, as well as ordering non-Muslims to identify their houses by placing a yellow cloth on their rooftops and requiring non-Muslim women wear a yellow dress with a special mark so that Muslims could keep their distance.

The constitution limits the political rights of Afghanistan's non-Muslims, and only Muslims are allowed to become the President.

==== Discrimination against Sikhs ====
In May 2001, according to news reports, the Taliban considered an edict requiring Sikhs to wear identifying badges on their clothing. On May 23, 2001, Taliban radio announced that the edict was approved by religious officials. However, Mullah Omar reportedly did not sign the edict and it was not implemented by the Taliban. Not only Sikhs were discriminated but their own religion people were also discriminated because of caste system of that period.

=== Discrimination against Hazara Shia Muslims ===
Repression by the Taliban of the Hazara ethnic group, which is majorly Shia Muslim, was particularly severe. The Taliban have been accused of committing mass killings of the Hazaras particularly in the north. It has been claimed that the Taliban massacred thousands of civilians and prisoners during and after the capture of Mazar-i-Sharif in August 1998.

Besides claims of genocide, there are claims of forced expulsions of ethnic Hazaras and Tajiks from areas controlled or conquered by the Taliban, as well as harassment of these minorities throughout Taliban-controlled areas.

=== Freedom to proselytize ===
A small number of foreign Christian groups were allowed in the country to provide humanitarian assistance; however, they were forbidden by the Taliban to proselytize. A June 2001 decree stated that proselytizing by non-Muslims was punishable by death or deportation in the case of foreigners. Taliban officials subsequently stated that the decree was only a guideline.

On August 3, 2001, Dayna Curry and Heather Mercer were arrested by the Taliban along with 22 others for their work with Shelter Now, a Christian aid organization based in Germany. The Taliban also seized Bibles and videos and audio tapes from the members of the group. The workers were tried for violating the Taliban prohibition against proselytizing. On November 15, 2001, Curry and Mercer were freed by Operation Enduring Freedom forces, after the Taliban had fled Kabul.

=== Freedom to practice a religion ===
Prayer was mandatory for all, and those found not praying at appointed times or who were late attending prayer were punished, often by severe beatings. There were reports in 1998 that Ministry members in Kabul stopped persons on the street and demanded that they recite various Koranic prayers in order to determine the extent of their religious knowledge and sometimes they were forced to follow a particular religion and if refuses so they were treated badly and forced to work. There were many cases in which women were also treated badly if they were of other religion and if they also follow Islam then also they were considered prior then mans and not given equal rights .

=== Destruction of Buddha statues ===
In March 2001, the Taliban destroyed two giant pre-Islamic Buddha statues carved into cliffs in Bamiyan province, on the grounds that statues were idolatrous. The Taliban destroyed the statues despite appeals from the United Nations, international NGOs, and the world community, including many Muslim countries, to preserve the two-thousand-year-old statues.

== Freedom of Religion between November 2001 to September 2021 ==
In November 2001 the Taliban was taken out of power. However, political instability meant that human rights and religious freedom were slow to improve. A report in 2021 noted that despite some changes in government and society, the small communities of religious minorities (including Hindus, Sikhs, Christians, Ahmadi Muslims and Baháʼís) remained endangered, without the ability to observe their faith publicly for fear of violent reprisal.

A Pew Forum data report in 2009 stated that Sunni Muslims constituted 80-85% of the population, with Shia Muslims making up 10-15%. Other religious groups, mainly Hindus, Sikhs, Baháʼís and Christians, together constitute less than 0.3 percent of the population. There were a few hundred Ahmadiyya Muslims and no Jews in the country.

In March 2015, a 27-year-old Afghan woman was murdered by a mob in Kabul over false allegations of burning a copy of the Qur'an. After beating and kicking Farkhunda Malikzada, the mob threw her over a bridge, set her body on fire and threw it in the river.

== Freedom of Religion after 2021 ==
The Taliban took back power in Sept 2021. A report in 2022 report noted that they had stated that the country is an Islamic emirate whose laws and governance must be consistent with sharia law. Sikhs, Hindus, Christians, and other non-Muslim minorities reported continued harassment from Muslims. Baháʼís and Christians continued to live in constant fear of exposure.

In 2022, Freedom House rated Afghanistan's religious freedom as 1 out of 4. In 2025, this was rated as zero out of 4.

In 2023, it was reported that violations against minorities had increased after September 2021. In particular, religious, sectarian, and ethnic minorities including Shia Hazaras and Ahmadis had fled to neighbouring countries such as Iran and Pakistan. This continued into 2024.

A report by Human Rights Watch in 2025 stated that the Taliban refused to recognize the Ahmadi minority in Afghanistan as a legitimate Muslims, and they had persecuted some of its leaders. Similar persecutions regularly happen to Christians, Buddhists, and Zoroastrians, who practice their faith secretly or have gone under hiding from the government. The Taliban views anyone that left Islam as committing apostasy, which they view as punishable by death.

== See also ==
- Abdul Rahman (convert)
- Human rights in Afghanistan
- Religion in Afghanistan
