= Religion in Afghanistan =

Religion in Afghanistan (ARDA 2025)
1. Sunni Islam (88.4%)
2. Shia Islam (11.5%)
3. Other religions (0.14%)

Sunni Islam (Hanafi/Deobandi) is the largest and the state religion of the Islamic Emirate of Afghanistan. According to The World Factbook, Sunni Muslims constitute between 84.7 and 89.7% of the population, and Shia Muslims between 10 and 15%. Other religions comprise the remaining 0.3%.

In 2022, Freedom House rated Afghanistan's religious freedom as 1 out of 4.

== History ==
Religious demographics in the region known today as Afghanistan have shifted numerous times in history. In ancient and classical periods, Zoroastrianism, Hinduism, followed by Buddhism were the primary religions in the region. Islam gradually became the primary religion in the region after first being introduced in the 7th century A.D., when the Rashidun Caliphate conquered parts of the region.

The religion Zoroastrianism is believed by some to have originated in what is now Afghanistan between 1800 and 800 BCE, as its founder Zoroaster is thought to have lived and died in Balkh while the region at the time was referred to as Ariana. Ancient Eastern Iranian languages may have been spoken in the region around the time of the rise of Zoroastrianism. By the middle of the 6th century BCE, the Achaemenids overthrew the Medes and incorporated Arachosia, Aria, and Bactria within its eastern boundaries. An inscription on the tombstone of Darius I of Persia mentions the Kabul Valley in a list of the 29 countries that he had conquered.

Before the arrival of Islam, Southern Afghanistan used to be a stronghold of Zoroastrianism. There were close relations between Persia and Arachosia concerning the Zoroastrian faith. It is believed that the Avesta had arrived in Persia through Arachosia. Thus the region is also considered as a "second fatherland for Zoroastrianism".

Mainly concentrated in eastern and southern regions of present-day Afghanistan, early Indo-Aryan inhabitants (between 2000 and 1500 BCE) were adherents of Hinduism. Notable among these inhabitant groups were the Gandharis and Kambojas, while the Pashayi and Nuristanis are contemporary examples of these Indo-Aryan Vedic people. With a component of Vedic ancestors from the Pakthas, Pashtuns, the majority eastern Iranian ethnic group in Afghanistan, also widely practiced Hinduism and Buddhism.

"The Pakthas, Bhalanases, Vishanins, Alinas, and Sivas were the five frontier tribes. The Pakthas lived in the hills from which the Kruma originates. Zimmer locates them in present-day eastern Afghanistan, identifying them with the modern Pakthun."

Following Alexander the Great's conquest and occupation in the 4th century BC, the successor-state Seleucid Empire controlled the area until 305 BC when they gave much of it to the Indian Maurya Empire as part of an alliance treaty. The Mauryans brought Buddhism from India and controlled parts of southern and eastern Afghanistan until about 185 BC when they were overthrown.

In the 7th century, the Umayyad Arab Muslims entered into the area now known as Afghanistan after decisively defeating the Sassanians in the Battle of Nihawand (642 AD). Following this colossal defeat, the last Sassanid Emperor, Yazdegerd III, became a hunted fugitive and fled eastward deep into Central Asia. In pursuing Yazdegerd, the Arabs chose to enter the area from north-eastern Iran and thereafter into Herat, where they stationed a large portion of their army before advancing toward the rest of Afghanistan. The Arabs exerted considerable efforts toward propagating Islam amongst the locals.

A large number of the inhabitants of the region of northern Afghanistan accepted Islam through Umayyad missionary efforts, particularly under the reigns of Hisham ibn Abd al-Malik (caliph from 724 to 743) and Umar ibn AbdulAziz (caliph from 717 to 720). During the reign of Al-Mu'tasim Islam was generally practiced amongst most inhabitants of the region and finally under Ya'qub-i Laith Saffari, Islam was by far, the predominant religion of Kabul along with other major cities of Afghanistan. Later, the Samanids propagated Islam deep into the heart of Central Asia, as the first complete translation of the Qur'an into Persian occurred in the 9th century. Since the 9th century, Islam has dominated the country's religious landscape. Islamic leaders have entered the political sphere at various times of crisis, but rarely exercised secular authority for long. Remnants of the Hindu Shahi dynasty in Afghanistan's eastern borders were expelled by Mahmud of Ghazni during 998 and 1030.

Until the 1890s, the country's Nuristan region was known as Kafiristan (land of the kafirs or "infidels") because of its inhabitants: the Nuristani, an ethnically distinctive people who practiced Animism and ancient Hinduism.

By the 20th century, Islam made up as much as 99 percent of the population. The country's religious minorities such as Hindus and Jews did, however, enjoy "complete religious freedom" as of the early 1970s.

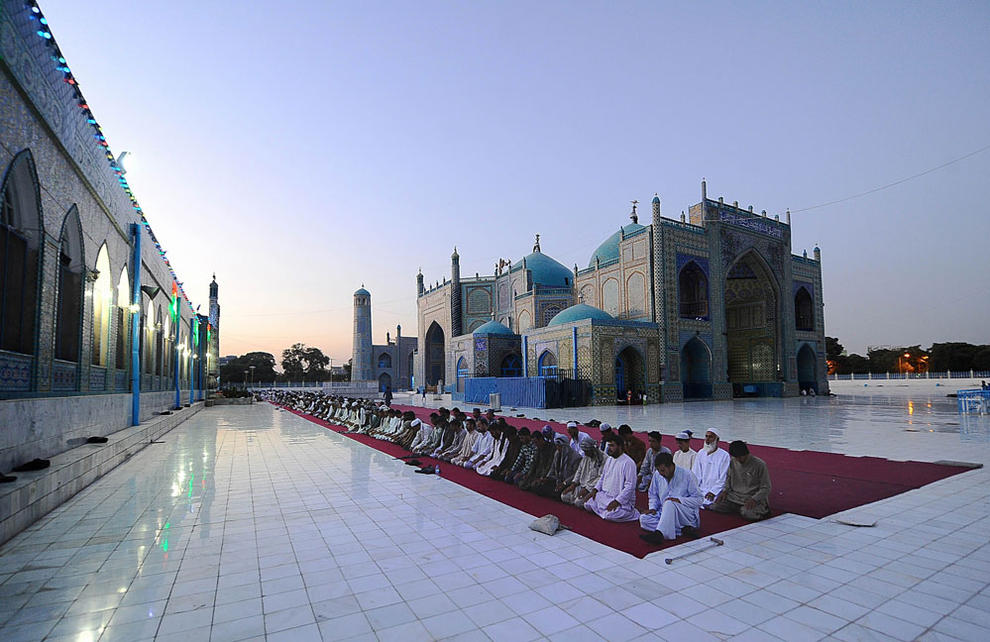
Men praying at the Blue Mosque (or Shrine of Ali) in the northern Afghan city of Mazar-i-Sharif

The 1979 Soviet invasion in support of a communist government triggered a major intervention of religion into Afghan political conflict. The Democratic Republic of Afghanistan (1980–1987) was a secular state; Islam united the multi-ethnic political opposition. The Soviet-backed Marxist-style regime and the People's Democratic Party of Afghanistan (PDPA) moved to reduce the influence of Islam. The PDPA imprisoned, tortured and murdered many members of the religious establishment. After National Reconciliation talks in 1987, Islam became once again the state religion and the country removed the word "Democratic" from its official name. From 1987-1992, the country's official name was the Republic of Afghanistan. The Sikh, Hindu, Christian, and Zoroastrian minorities have declined since; in the 1970s, it is estimated the country had around 500,000 Sikhs and 200,000 Hindus, while perhaps 7–10,000 remained in 2017.

The Taliban won the Afghan Civil War in the 1990s and established the Islamic Emirate of Afghanistan (1996–2001), an autocratic Islamic theocracy that imposed the Taliban's extreme version of Islam on the parts of the country it controlled. After the overthrow of the Taliban in 2001, a new Islamic Republic was established in 2004 that combined state-sponsored Islam with Western democracy, the Islamic Republic of Afghanistan. With the fall of the Republic in 2021 and the return of the Taliban, it remains to be seen how the new Taliban government treats the matter; their harsh suppression of journalism and foreigners have made getting reliable reports on the religious situation in Afghanistan difficult.

For Afghans, Islam represents a potentially unifying symbolic system which offsets the divisiveness that frequently rises from the existence of a deep pride in tribal loyalties and an abounding sense of personal and family honor found in multitribal and multiethnic societies such as Afghanistan. Mosques serve not only as places of worship, but for a multitude of functions, including shelter for guests, places to meet and converse, the focus of social religious festivities and schools. Almost every Afghan has at one time during his youth studied at a mosque school; for some this is the only formal education they receive.

== Demographics ==
A Pew Forum data report in 2009 stated that Sunni Muslims constituted 80-85% of the population, with Shia Muslims making up 10-15%. Other religious groups, mainly Hindus, Sikhs, Baha’is and Christians, together constitute less than 0.3 percent of the population. There were a few hundred Ahmadiyya Muslims and no Jews in the country.

== Minority religious groups ==
=== Shia Islam ===
The Shias make up between 7% and 20% of the total population of Afghanistan. Although there is a tiny minority Sunnis among them, the majority of Hazaras are Shia, mostly of the Twelver branch with some smaller groups who practice the Ismailism branch. The Qizilbash of Afghanistan have traditionally been Shias.

Shia Muslims in Afghanistan are a source of tension between Afghanistan and its neighbor the Islamic Republic of Iran. The reigning Taliban are fiercely Sunni, while Iran is dominated by Shia Islam. As such, treatment of Afghanistan's Shia minority affect relations with one of Afghanistan's most important neighbors.

=== Modernist and non-denominational Muslims ===
One of the most important revivalists and resuscitators of the Islamic Modernist and non-denominational Muslim movement in the contemporary era was Jamal ad-Din al-Afghani.

=== Christianity ===
Some unconfirmed reports state that there are 1,000 to 18,000 Afghan Christians practicing their faith secretly in the country. A 2015 study estimates some 3,300 Christians from a Muslim background residing in the country. In accordance with Global Christian Persecution Index, Christians are mostly persecuted, in Afghanistan, since 2022.

=== Judaism ===
There was a small Jewish community in Afghanistan who fled the country before and after the 1979 Soviet invasion. It is thought that there are between 500 and 1,000 secret Jews in Afghanistan who were forced to convert to Islam after the Taliban took control of the country in the 1990s. There are Afghan Jewish expatriate communities in Israel, the United States, Canada, and the United Kingdom. The last Jew, Zablon Simintov, left the country on 7 September 2021 after the Taliban took over the country.

=== Baháʼí Faith ===
The Baháʼí Faith was introduced to Afghanistan in 1919 and Baháʼís have been living there since the 1880s. As of 2010, there were approximately 16,500 Baháʼís in Afghanistan.

=== Zoroastrianism ===
According to the World Christian Encyclopedia, 2,000 Afghans identified as Zoroastrians in 1970.

=== Dharmic religions ===
Historically, the southern and eastern parts of Afghanistan had periods where Hindus, Buddhists, and Jains were present in large numbers.

There are about 1,300 Afghan Sikhs and a little over 600 Hindus living in different cities but mostly in Kabul, Jalalabad, and Ghazni. Senator Awtar Singh was the only Sikh in Afghanistan's parliament of 2010.

A notable remnant of the Buddhist history in Afghanistan were the massive Buddhas of Bamiyan statues, carved in the 6th and 7th centuries. The statues were destroyed in March 2001 by the reigning Taliban as idolatrous. Taliban soldiers used rockets and guns to destroy them.

== Freedom of religion after 2021 ==
The Taliban took back power in August 2021. A report in 2022 report noted that they had stated that the country is an Islamic emirate whose laws and governance must be consistent with sharia law. Non-Muslims reported continued harassment from Muslims, while Baha’is and Christians continued to live in constant fear of exposure.

In 2023, it was reported that violations against minorities had increased after September 2021. In particular, many minority peoples had fled to neighbouring countries such as Iran and Pakistan, as well as further afield.

== See also ==
- Islam in Afghanistan
- Christianity in Afghanistan
- Judaism in Afghanistan
- Baháʼí Faith in Afghanistan
- Hinduism in Afghanistan
- Buddhism in Afghanistan
- Jainism in Afghanistan
- Sikhism in Afghanistan
- Irreligion in Afghanistan
- Religious freedom in Afghanistan
