= Outline of Afghanistan =

Country in South Asia

Flag of Afghanistan (2021-)

Emblem of Afghanistan (2021-)

Flag of Afghanistan (2013-2021) (Present day as internationally-recognized former government.)

Emblem of Afghanistan (2013–2021)

Flag of Afghanistan (2004-2013)

Emblem of Afghanistan (2004–2013)

The location of Afghanistan

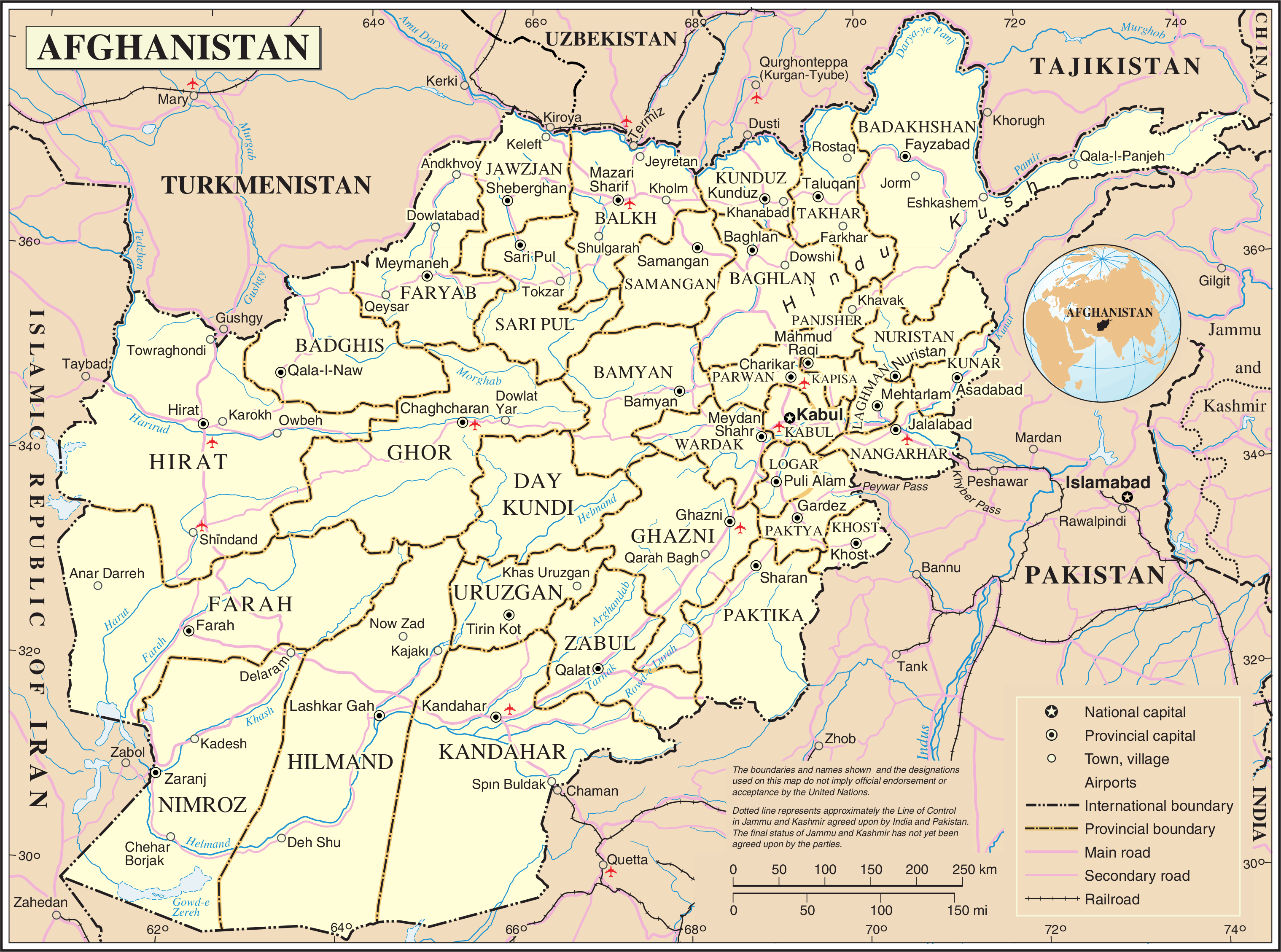
An enlargeable map of Afghanistan

The following outline is provided as an overview of and topical guide to Afghanistan:

Afghanistan – landlocked sovereign country located in Central Asia. Since the late 1970s Afghanistan has experienced a continuous state of civil war.

== General reference ==
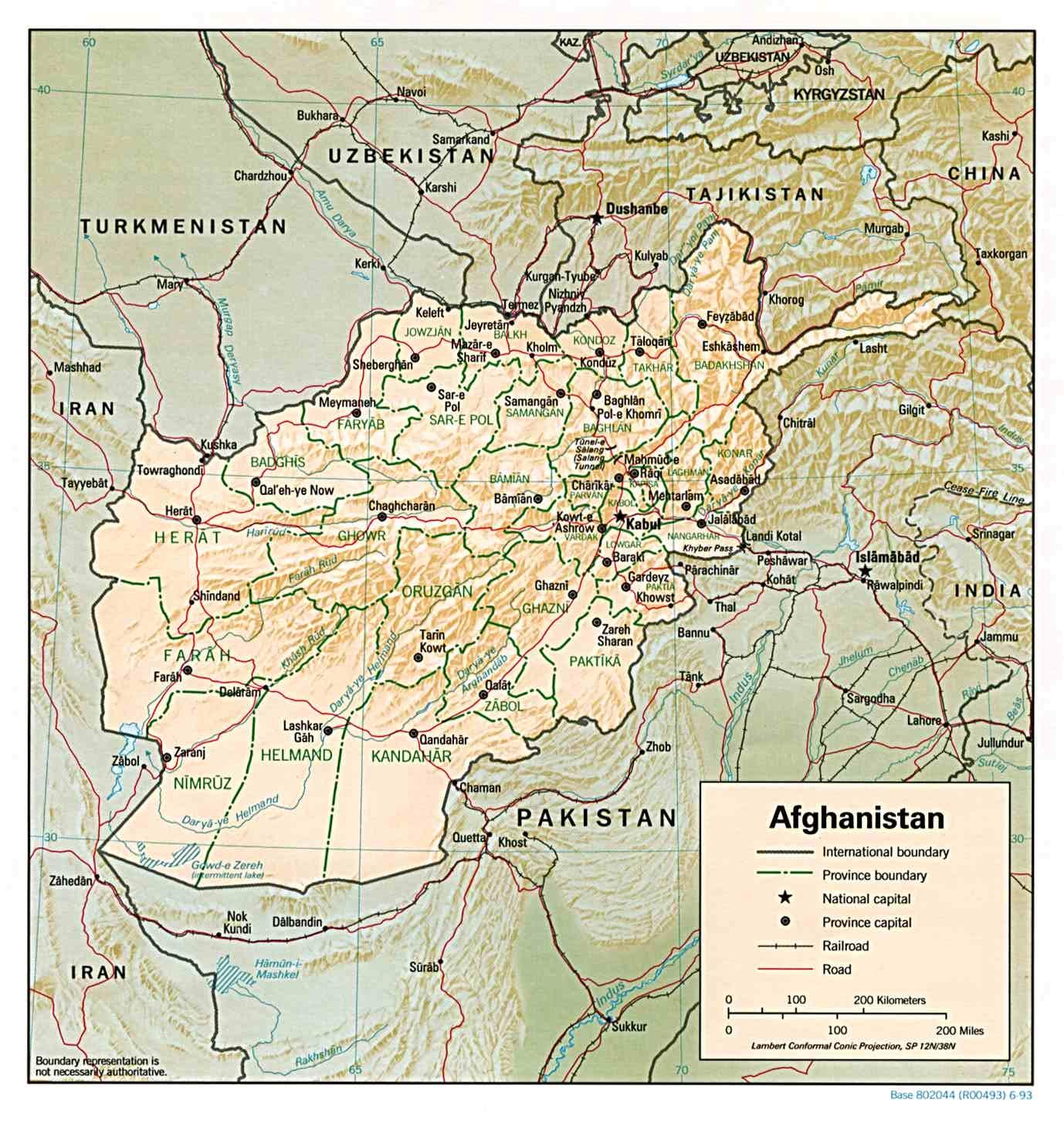
An enlargeable relief map of Afghanistan

- Pronunciation:
- Common English country name: Afghanistan
- Official English country name: Islamic Emirate of Afghanistan
- Common endonym(s):
- Official endonym(s):
- Adjectival(s): Afghan
- Demonym(s): Afghans
- Etymology: Name of Afghanistan
- International rankings of Afghanistan
- ISO country codes: AF, AFG, 004
- ISO region codes: See ISO 3166-2:AF
- Internet country code top-level domain: .af

Islamic Republic of Afghanistan Afghanistan

== Geography of Afghanistan ==
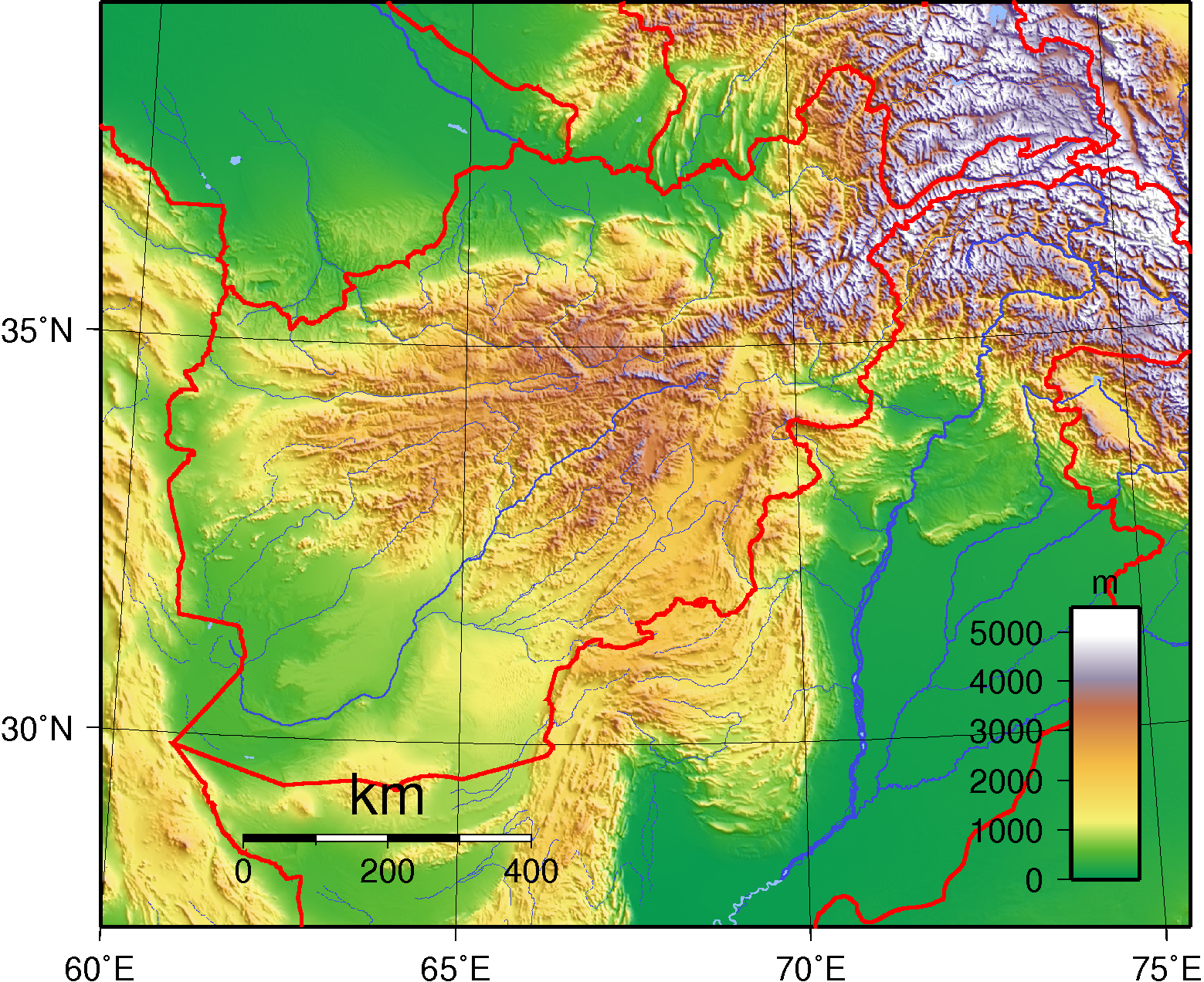
An enlargeable topographic map of Afghanistan

Geography of Afghanistan

- Afghanistan is: a landlocked country
- Location:
  - Northern Hemisphere and Eastern Hemisphere
    - Eurasia
      - Asia
        - (Central Asia)
  - Greater Middle East
    - Iranian plateau
  - Time zone: UTC+04:30
  - Extreme points of Afghanistan
    - High: Noshaq 7,492 m (24,580 ft)
    - Low: Amu Darya 258 m (846 ft)
  - Land boundaries: 5,529 km

Pakistan 2,430 km
Tajikistan 1,206 km
Iran 936 km
Turkmenistan 744 km
Uzbekistan 137 km
India 106 km
China 76 km

- Coastline: none

- Population of Afghanistan: 39,864,082 (2021 estimate) – 36th most populous country
- Area of Afghanistan: 652,860 square kilometres (252,070 sq mi) – 40th largest country
- Atlas of Afghanistan

=== Environment of Afghanistan ===
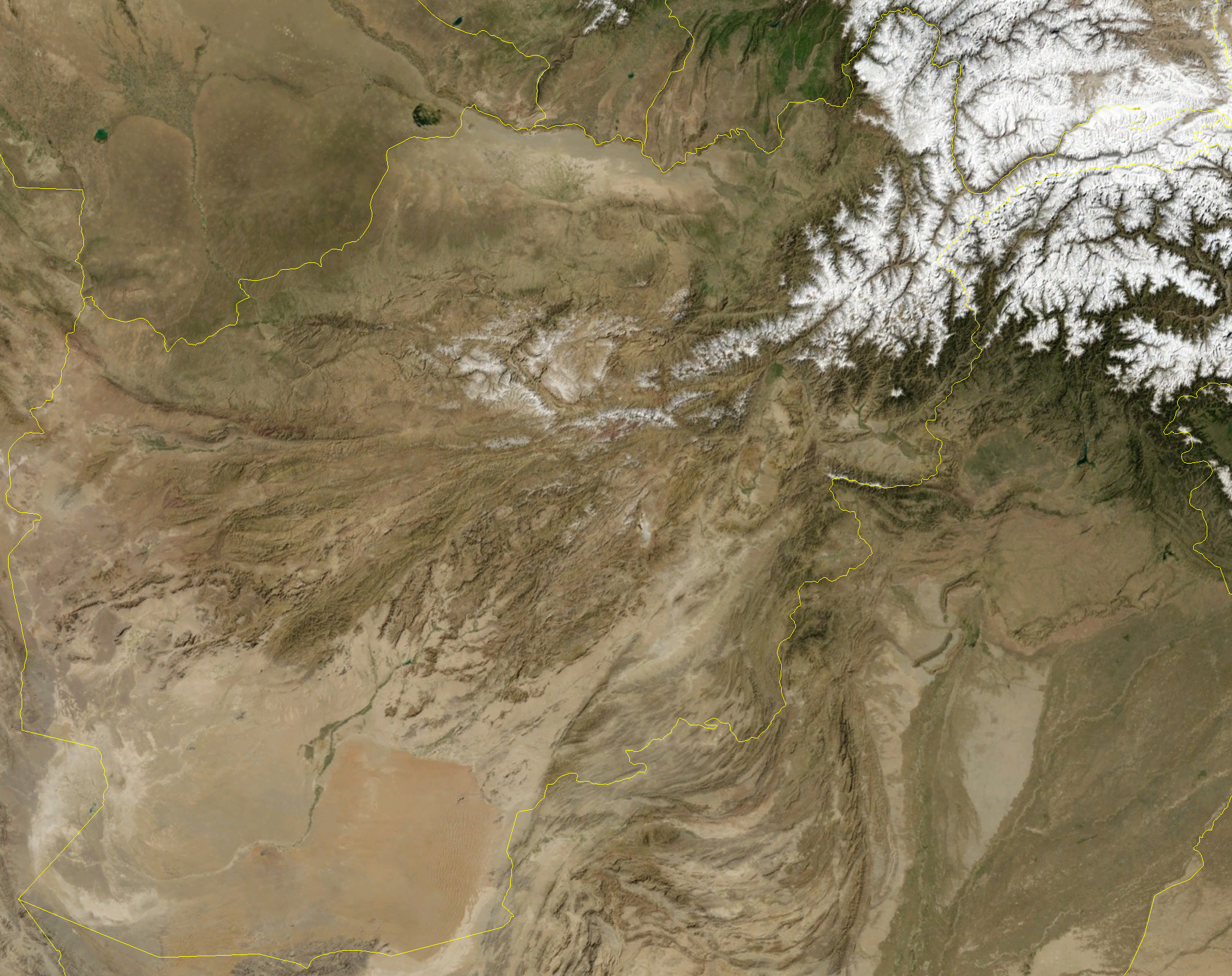
An enlargeable satellite image of Afghanistan

Environment of Afghanistan

- Climate of Afghanistan
- Ecoregions in Afghanistan
- Environmental issues in Afghanistan
- Protected areas of Afghanistan
- Renewable energy in Afghanistan
- Wildlife of Afghanistan
  - Fauna of Afghanistan
    - Birds of Afghanistan
    - Mammals of Afghanistan

==== Natural geographic features of Afghanistan ====
- Mountains of Afghanistan
  - Volcanoes in Afghanistan
- Rivers of Afghanistan
- List of World Heritage Sites in Afghanistan

==== Ecoregions of Afghanistan ====
List of ecoregions in Afghanistan

== Administrative divisions of Afghanistan ==
Administrative divisions of Afghanistan

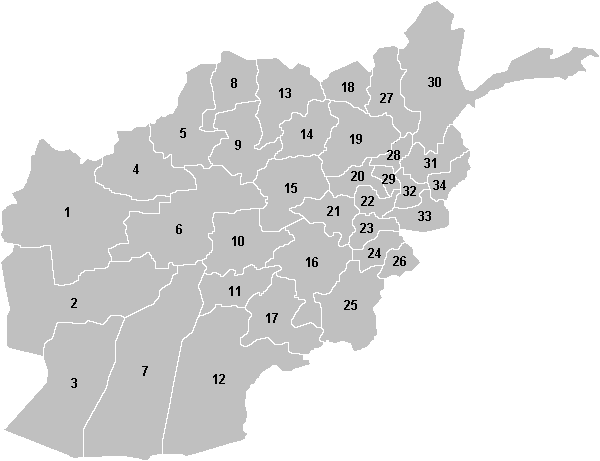
Map of Afghanistan with province border lines.

- Regions of Afghanistan
  - Provinces of Afghanistan
    - Districts of Afghanistan
      - Subdistricts of Afghanistan

=== Regions of Afghanistan ===
Regions of Afghanistan

==== Provinces of Afghanistan ====
1. Badakhshan Province
2. Badghis Province
3. Baghlan Province
4. Balkh Province
5. Bamyan Province
6. Daykundi Province
7. Farah Province
8. Faryab Province
9. Ghazni Province
10. Ghor Province
11. Helmand Province
12. Herat Province
13. Jowzjan Province
14. Kabul Province
15. Kandahar Province
16. Kapisa Province
17. Khost Province
18. Kunar Province
19. Kunduz Province
20. Laghman Province
21. Lowgar Province
22. Nangarhar Province
23. Nimruz Province
24. Nurestan Province
25. Orūzgān Province
26. Paktia Province
27. Paktika Province
28. Panjshir Province
29. Parwan Province
30. Samangan Province
31. Sar-e Pol Province
32. Takhar Province
33. Wardak Province
34. Zabul Province
- Capital of Afghanistan: Kabul
- Cities of Afghanistan

== Demography of Afghanistan ==
Demographics of Afghanistan

== Government and politics of Islamic Emirate of Afghanistan (2021-present) ==
Politics of Afghanistan

- Form of government: theocratic emirate with a totalitarian regime, ruled by the Taliban
- Capital of Afghanistan: Kabul
- Military of Afghanistan

=== Executive branch of the government of Islamic Emirate of Afghanistan ===
- Head of State: Supreme Leader of Afghanistan, Hibatullah Akhundzada
- Head of Government: Prime Minister of Afghanistan, Hasan Akhund
- Cabinet of Afghanistan

Judicial branch of the government of Islamic Emirate of Afghanistan

- Supreme Court of Afghanistan
  - Chief Justice of Afghanistan

=== Foreign relations of Afghanistan ===
Foreign relations of Afghanistan

- Diplomatic missions in Afghanistan
- Diplomatic missions of Afghanistan
- United States-Afghanistan relations

==== International organization membership ====
The Islamic Emirate of Afghanistan is a member of:

- Asian Development Bank (ADB)
- Colombo Plan (CP)
- Economic Cooperation Organization (ECO)
- Food and Agriculture Organization (FAO)
- Group of 77 (G77)
- International Atomic Energy Agency (IAEA)
- International Bank for Reconstruction and Development (IBRD)
- International Civil Aviation Organization (ICAO)
- International Criminal Court (ICCt)
- International Criminal Police Organization (Interpol)
- International Development Association (IDA)
- International Finance Corporation (IFC)
- International Fund for Agricultural Development (IFAD)
- International Labour Organization (ILO)
- International Monetary Fund (IMF)
- International Olympic Committee (IOC)
- International Organization for Migration (IOM)
- International Organization for Standardization (ISO) (correspondent)
- International Telecommunication Union (ITU)
- International Telecommunications Satellite Organization (ITSO)
- Islamic Development Bank (IDB)
- Multilateral Investment Guarantee Agency (MIGA)
- Nonaligned Movement (NAM)
- Organization for Security and Cooperation in Europe (OSCE) (partner)
- Organisation for the Prohibition of Chemical Weapons (OPCW)
- Organisation of Islamic Cooperation (OIC)
- Shanghai Cooperation Organisation (SCO) (guest)
- South Asia Co-operative Environment Programme (SACEP)
- South Asian Association for Regional Cooperation (SAARC)
- United Nations (UN)
- United Nations Conference on Trade and Development (UNCTAD)
- United Nations Educational, Scientific, and Cultural Organization (UNESCO)
- United Nations Industrial Development Organization (UNIDO)
- Universal Postal Union (UPU)
- World Customs Organization (WCO)
- World Federation of Trade Unions (WFTU)
- World Health Organization (WHO)
- World Intellectual Property Organization (WIPO)
- World Meteorological Organization (WMO)
- World Tourism Organization (UNWTO)
- World Trade Organization (WTO)

Law and order in Islamic Emirate of Afghanistan

- Law of Afghanistan
- Constitution of Afghanistan
- Human rights of Afghanistan
  - Freedom of religion in Afghanistan
  - LGBTQ rights in Afghanistan
  - Women in Afghanistan
  - Slavery in Afghanistan

Military of Islamic Emirate of Afghanistan

- Command:
  - Commander-in-chief: Supreme leader of Afghanistan
- Afghan Armed Forces
  - Afghan Army
  - Afghan Air Forces
- List of equipment of the Afghan Armed Forces

== Government and politics of Islamic Republic of Afghanistan (2004–2021) ==
Politics of the Islamic Republic of Afghanistan

- Form of government: Islamic republic
- Capital of Afghanistan: Kabul
- Elections in Afghanistan
  - Afghan presidential election, 2009
  - Afghan parliamentary election, 2005
  - Afghan presidential election, 2004
- Political parties in Afghanistan
- Taxation in Afghanistan

=== Branches of government ===
Government of Islamic Republic of Afghanistan

==== Executive branch of the government of Islamic Republic Afghanistan ====
- Head of state and head of government: President of Afghanistan
- Afghan Cabinet of Ministers

==== Legislative branch of the government of Islamic Afghanistan ====
- National Assembly of Afghanistan (bicameral)
  - Upper house: House of Elders (Meshrano Jirga)
  - Lower house: House of the People (Wolesi Jirga)

==== Judicial branch of the government of Islamic Afghanistan ====
- Afghan Supreme Court (Stara Makama or ستره محكمه)
  - Chief Justice of Afghanistan
  - High Courts of Afghanistan
    - Appeals Courts of Afghanistan
      - District courts of Afghanistan
        - Local courts of Afghanistan

=== Foreign relations of Afghanistan ===
Foreign relations of Afghanistan

- Diplomatic missions in Afghanistan
- Diplomatic missions of Afghanistan
- United States-Afghanistan relations
- Foreign hostages in Afghanistan

==== International organization membership ====
The Islamic Republic of Afghanistan is a member of:

- Asian Development Bank (ADB)
- Colombo Plan (CP)
- Economic Cooperation Organization (ECO)
- Food and Agriculture Organization (FAO)
- Group of 77 (G77)
- International Atomic Energy Agency (IAEA)
- International Bank for Reconstruction and Development (IBRD)
- International Civil Aviation Organization (ICAO)
- International Criminal Court (ICCt)
- International Criminal Police Organization (Interpol)
- International Development Association (IDA)
- International Finance Corporation (IFC)
- International Fund for Agricultural Development (IFAD)
- International Labour Organization (ILO)
- International Monetary Fund (IMF)
- International Olympic Committee (IOC)
- International Organization for Migration (IOM)
- International Organization for Standardization (ISO) (correspondent)
- International Telecommunication Union (ITU)
- International Telecommunications Satellite Organization (ITSO)
- Islamic Development Bank (IDB)
- Multilateral Investment Guarantee Agency (MIGA)
- Nonaligned Movement (NAM)
- Organization for Security and Cooperation in Europe (OSCE) (partner)
- Organisation for the Prohibition of Chemical Weapons (OPCW)
- Organisation of Islamic Cooperation (OIC)
- Shanghai Cooperation Organisation (SCO) (guest)
- South Asia Co-operative Environment Programme (SACEP)
- South Asian Association for Regional Cooperation (SAARC)
- United Nations (UN)
- United Nations Conference on Trade and Development (UNCTAD)
- United Nations Educational, Scientific, and Cultural Organization (UNESCO)
- United Nations Industrial Development Organization (UNIDO)
- Universal Postal Union (UPU)
- World Customs Organization (WCO)
- World Federation of Trade Unions (WFTU)
- World Health Organization (WHO)
- World Intellectual Property Organization (WIPO)
- World Meteorological Organization (WMO)
- World Tourism Organization (UNWTO)
- World Trade Organization (WTO)

=== Law and order in Islamic Republic of Afghanistan ===
Law of Afghanistan

- Cannabis in Afghanistan
- Capital punishment in Afghanistan
- Constitution of Afghanistan
- Crime in Afghanistan
- Human rights in Afghanistan
  - LGBT rights in Afghanistan
  - Freedom of religion in Afghanistan
- Law enforcement in Afghanistan

=== Military of Islamic Republic Afghanistan ===
Afghan Armed Forces (2002-2021)

- Command
  - Commander-in-chief:
    - President of Afghanistan
- Afghan National Security Forces
  - Afghan Armed Forces
    - Afghan National Army
    - Afghan Air Force
  - Afghan National Police
  - Afghan Local Police
  - Afghan Border Police
  - National Directorate of Security

== History of Afghanistan ==
History of Afghanistan

- Timeline of the history of Afghanistan
- Current events of Afghanistan

=== By period ===
- Ancient history of Afghanistan
- Greater Khorasan
- Muslim conquests of Afghanistan
- History of Arabs in Afghanistan
- Mongol invasion of Central Asia
- Hotak dynasty
- Siege of Kandahar
- Durrani Empire
- Third Battle of Panipat
- Battle of Jamrud
- First Anglo-Afghan War
- Second Anglo-Afghan War
- Third Anglo-Afghan War
- European influence in Afghanistan
- Reforms of Amanullah Khan and civil war
- Reigns of Nadir Shah and Zahir Shah
- Daoud's Republic of Afghanistan
- Democratic Republic of Afghanistan
- Soviet–Afghan War
- History of Afghanistan since 1992
- War in Afghanistan (2001–2021)

=== By subject ===
- History of Arabs in Afghanistan
- Military history of Afghanistan

== Culture of Afghanistan ==
Culture of Afghanistan

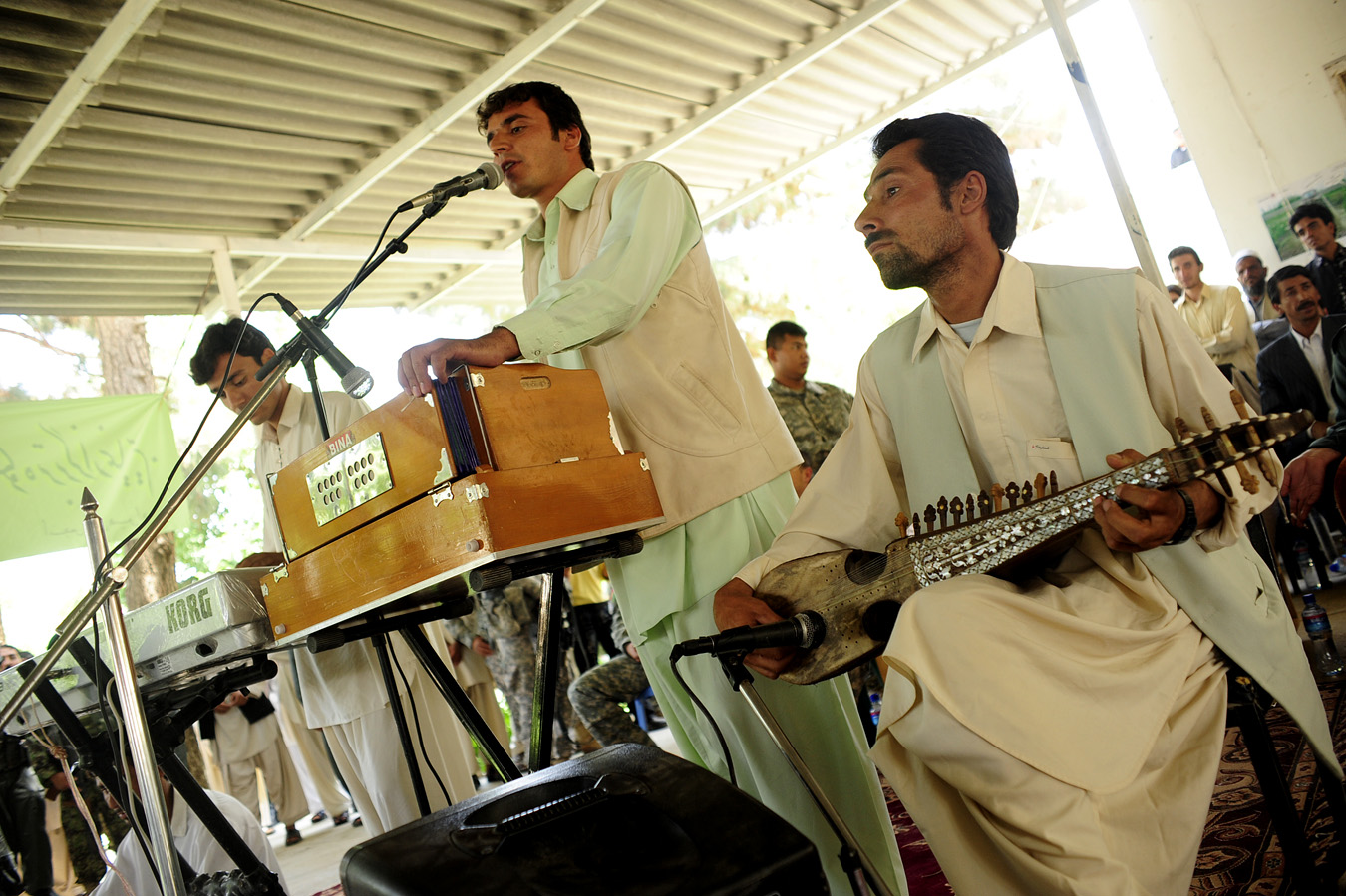
Afghan musicians in Farah, Afghanistan.

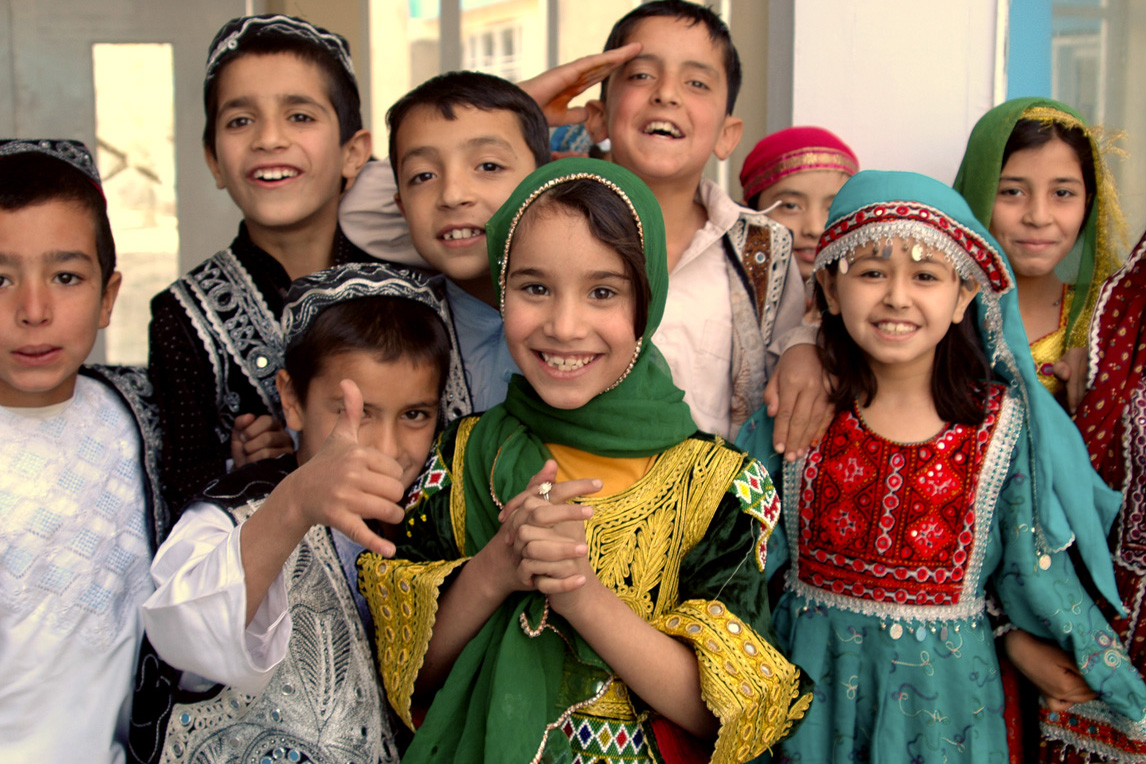
Afghan boys and girls at Kabul

- Ethnic groups in Afghanistan
- Architecture of Afghanistan
- Cuisine of Afghanistan
- Languages of Afghanistan
- Media in Afghanistan
- National symbols of Afghanistan
  - Emblem of Afghanistan
  - Flag of Afghanistan
  - National anthem of Afghanistan
- People of Afghanistan
  - Ethnic minorities in Afghanistan
- Prostitution in Afghanistan
- Public holidays in Afghanistan
- Women in Afghanistan
- List of World Heritage Sites in Afghanistan

=== Art in Afghanistan ===
- Art in Afghanistan
  - Cinema of Afghanistan
  - Music of Afghanistan
  - Television in Afghanistan

=== People of Afghanistan ===
- People of Afghanistan
  - Pashtun people
  - Tājik people
  - Qizilbash
  - Hazara people
  - Uzbek people
  - Turkmen people
  - Baloch people
  - Nuristani people
  - Arabs
  - Sunni Muslim
  - Shi'a Muslim

=== Religion in Afghanistan ===
- Religion in Afghanistan
  - Buddhism in Afghanistan
  - Christianity in Afghanistan
  - Hinduism in Afghanistan
  - Islam in Afghanistan
  - Judaism in Afghanistan
  - Sikhism in Afghanistan

=== Sports in Afghanistan ===
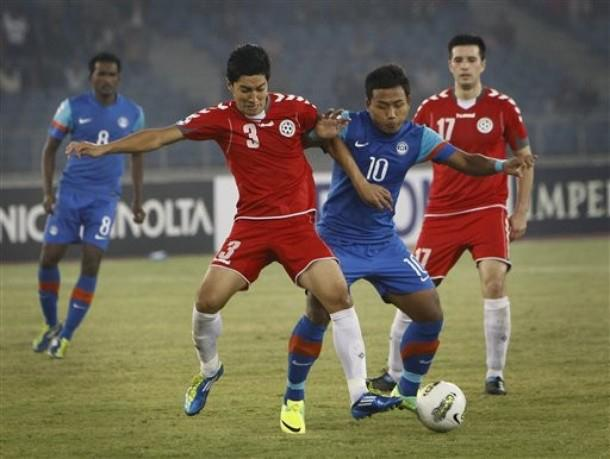
The Afghanistan national football team (in red strip) playing against India's team (in blue) during the 2011 SAFF Championship.

Sports in Afghanistan

- Football in Afghanistan
- Afghanistan at the Olympics
- Cricket in Afghanistan
- Traditional games of Afghanistan

== Economy and infrastructure of Afghanistan ==
Economy of Afghanistan

- Economic rank, by nominal GDP (2007): 119th (one hundred and nineteenth)
- Agriculture in Afghanistan
- Communications in Afghanistan
  - Internet in Afghanistan
- Companies of Afghanistan
- Currency of Afghanistan: Afghani
  - ISO 4217: AFN
- Energy in Afghanistan
  - Energy in Afghanistan
- Health care in Afghanistan
- Mining in Afghanistan
- Taxation in Afghanistan
- Tourism in Afghanistan
- Visa policy of Afghanistan
- Transport in Afghanistan
  - Airports in Afghanistan
  - Rail transport in Afghanistan

== Education in Afghanistan ==
Education in Afghanistan

- List of universities in Afghanistan
- List of schools in Afghanistan

== Health in Afghanistan ==
Health in Afghanistan

- Healthcare in Afghanistan
- List of hospital in Afghanistan

== See also ==
- Topic overview:
  - Afghanistan
  - Bibliography of Afghanistan
- List of international rankings
- Member state of the United Nations
