= List of World Heritage Sites in Southern Asia =

The UNESCO (United Nations Educational, Scientific and Cultural Organization) has designated 68 World Heritage Sites in six countries (also called "state parties") of Southern Asia: Afghanistan, India, Nepal, Pakistan, Sri Lanka and Bangladesh. Bhutan and Maldives, which are also located within the region, do not have any World Heritage Sites.

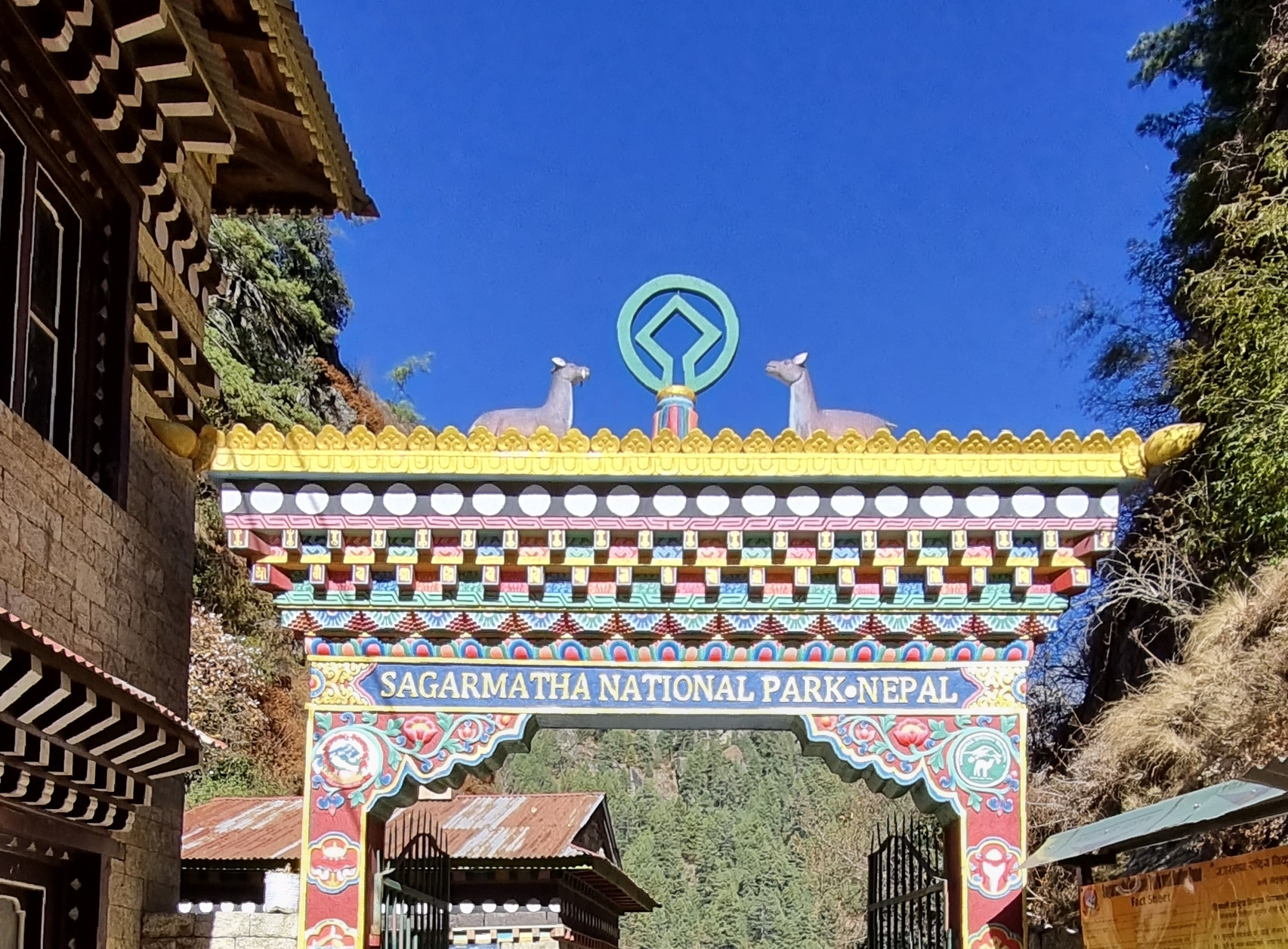
Entrance gate of the Sagarmatha National Park

The first sites recognised as World Heritage Sites in South Asia were the Sagarmatha National Park and the Kathmandu Valley in Nepal, inscribed in 1979. Nepal has currently a total of four sites. Sri Lanka has eight sites and Bangladesh has three sites. Pakistan has six sites. Two sites are located in Afghanistan, both of which are enlisted as endangered. India is home to most of the inscribed sites in the region (sixth globally) with 45 sites. Each year, UNESCO's World Heritage Committee may inscribe new sites on the list or delist sites that no longer meet the criteria. Selection is based on ten criteria: six for cultural heritage (i–vi) and four for natural heritage (vii–x). Some sites, designated "mixed sites", represent both cultural and natural heritage. In Southern Asia, there are 55 cultural, 12 natural, and 1 mixed site.

The World Heritage Committee may also specify that a site is endangered, citing "conditions which threaten the very characteristics for which a property was inscribed on the World Heritage List." Two sites in this region are currently listed as endangered.

== World Heritage Sites ==
† In danger
* Trans-border site

Site	Image	Location	Criteria	Area ha (acre)	Year	Description	Refs
Agra Fort		Agra, Uttar Pradesh, India; 27°11′0″N 78°2′0″E	Cultural: (iii)	—	1983	Agra Fort is a 16th-century Mughal imperial fortress in Agra. It got its present layout under the Emperor Akbar. The complex contains several palaces (Jahangiri Mahal pictured), audience halls, and two mosques. Stylistically, it is one of the high points of Indo-Islamic architecture, with influences of Persian and Timurid architecture.	
Ajanta Caves	A line of caves, some with columns on the outside, along a rock face.	Aurangabad District, Maharashtra, India; 20°33′12″N 75°42′0″E	Cultural: (i), (ii), (iii), (vi)	—	1983	The caves at Ajanta represent a collection of Buddhist art from two periods. The first monuments date to the 2nd and 1st centuries BCE and were created by the followers of Theravada Buddhism. Further monuments were added in the 5th and 6th centuries CE, during the Vakataka dynasty, by the followers of Mahayana Buddhism. The monuments are masterpieces of Buddhist art and exerted strong artistic influence in India and the broader region, especially in Java.	
Ancient Buddhist Site of Sarnath	A brick Buddhist stupa	Sarnath, Uttar Pradesh, India; 25.3780°N 83.0251°E	Cultural: (iii), (vi)	8.05 (19.9)	2026	This comprises two groups of monuments. The first group includes Buddhist temples, stupas (Dhamek Stupa pictured), and monasteries, as well as the remains of a pillar of Ashoka. They date from the 3rd century BCE to the 12th century CE. The second group is represented by the Chaukhandi Stupa, built in 1588.	
Ancient City of Polonnaruwa	Upper part of a reclining Buddha.	Polonnaruwa District, North Central Province, Sri Lanka; 7°54′57″N 81°0′2″E	Cultural: (ii), (iii), (vi)	—	1982	Following the destruction of Anuradhapura by the Chola dynasty, Polonnaruwa became the capital of the eponymous kingdom under Vijayabahu I. Several Hindu temples and bronze sculptures remain from the period. The city saw its golden age in the 12th century under Parakramabahu I, when numerous Buddhist monuments and temples were constructed, including the Vatadage (pictured), a temple that used to house the relic of the tooth of Buddha. It declined in the 13th century.	
Ancient City of Sigiriya		Matale District, Central Province, Sri Lanka; 7°57′0″N 80°45′0″E	Cultural: (ii), (iii), (iv)	—	1982	Sigiriya was the short-lived capital of King Kashyapa, who ruled between 477 and 495, after he had his father King Dhatusena killed. The city is built on and around the "Lion's rock", a 180 m (590 ft) granite volcanic plug. After the defeat of Kashyapa by his brother Moggallana I, the site was returned to Buddhist monks who had lived in the grottoes in the area earlier. Today, the site is in ruins, with parts of fortifications and buildings preserved, as well as frescos representing feminine figures. The style of these frescos was influential in the following centuries.	
Archaeological Ruins at Moenjodaro		Sindh, Pakistan; 27°19′45″N 68°8′20″E	Cultural: (ii), (iii)	240 (590)	1980	Mohenjo-daro was one of the largest cities of the Indus Valley Civilisation and was the first planned city in South Asia. Located on the banks of the Indus River, it flourished between 2,500 and 1,500 BCE. The city was mostly built with baked brick and followed a strict grid plan. There were public baths, a granary, and an elaborate drainage system. A Buddhist stupa was built over the ruins in the 2nd century CE. The excavations at the site have been ongoing since 1922, with about one third of the city having been explored so far.	
Archaeological Site of Nalanda Mahavihara (Nalanda University) at Nalanda, Bihar		Nalanda District, Bihar, India; 25°8′12″N 85°26′38″E	Cultural: (iv), (vi)	23 (57); buffer zone 57.88 (143.0)	2016	Nalanda Mahavihara was a Buddhist ancient higher-learning institution established in the 5th century and lasting until its sacking in the 13th century. However, some archaeological remains also date back to the 3rd century BCE. The remains include shrines and stupas, viharas (residential and educational buildings), and artworks in different materials. Both the architectural solutions and educational approaches were influential in other similar institutions in the broader region.	
Buddhist Monuments at Sanchi		Raisen District, Madhya Pradesh, India; 23°28′46″N 77°44′23″E	Cultural: (i), (ii), (iii), (iv), (vi)	—	1989	Sanchi is one of the oldest extant Buddhist sanctuaries and was instrumental in the spread of the religion through the Indian subcontinent. It became important under Emperor Ashoka of the Maurya Empire in the 3rd century BCE. The remains of a pillar from the period are preserved. Stupas (Stupa 1 pictured), palaces, temples, and monasteries are preserved in different states of conservation, mostly dating to the 2nd and 1st centuries BCE. The city declined in importance in the 12th century.	
Buddhist Ruins of Takht-i-Bahi and Neighbouring City Remains at Sahr-i-Bahlol		Khyber Pakhtunkhwa, Pakistan; 34°19′15″N 71°56′45″E	Cultural: (iv)	—	1980	The Buddhist monastery of Takht-i-Bahi (pictured) was founded in the 1st century CE and remained in use until the 7th century. Due to its location on the crest of a steep hill, it remained well preserved despite successive invasions of the region. The monastery and the remains of the nearby city of Seri Bahlol from the Kushan period are some of the most important Buddhist monuments in the Gandhara region. The monastery is the most complete Buddhist monastery in Pakistan and comprises several groups of stupas, monastic cells, temples, and secular buildings.	
Central Highlands of Sri Lanka		Sri Lanka; 7°27′9″N 80°48′8″E	Natural: (ix), (x)	56,844 (140,460); buffer zone 72,645 (179,510)	2010	Composed by three sites; Horton Plains National Park; Knuckles Conservation Forest; Peak Wilderness Protected Area	
Champaner-Pavagadh Archaeological Park		Panchmahal district, Gujarat, India; 22°29′0″N 73°32′0″E	Cultural: (iii), (iv), (v), (vi)	1,329 (3,280); buffer zone 2,912 (7,200)	2004	The site contains remains from several periods, from the Chalcolithic to the remains of Champaner, a short-lived capital of the Gujarat Sultanate in the 16th century. Important buildings include the Hindu temple Kalika Mata, Jain temples, and Jama Mosque (pictured) which features both Hindu and Muslim architectural elements, and the remains of water-managing systems, fortifications, and 14th-century temples.	
Chhatrapati Shivaji Terminus (formerly Victoria Terminus)		Mumbai, Maharashtra, India; 18°56′24″N 72°50′10″E	Cultural: (ii), (iv)	2.85 (7.0)	2004	The historic terminal train station in Mumbai was built in the late 19th century. It was designed by Frederick William Stevens in the Victorian Gothic style, drawing influences from Italian Gothic architecture and combining them with influences from Indian traditional buildings. It symbolized the wealth of Mumbai as a major commercial port within the British Commonwealth.	
Chitwan National Park	A lake with tree trunks in the water.	Chitwan District, Narayani Zone, Nepal; 27°30′0″N 84°20′0″E	Natural: (vii), (ix), (x)	93,200 (230,000)	1984	Chitwan National Park, part of the subtropical Inner Terai lowlands of south-central Nepal, is home to one of the last populations of Indian rhinoceros and the Bengal tiger. Historically used by the feudal big game hunters and their entourage, where they stayed for a couple of months shooting hundreds of tigers, rhinoceroses, elephants, leopards, and sloth bears. The park is now one of the last remaining ecosystems of the Tarai region and it is home to over 68 mammal species.	
Churches and Convents of Goa	A stone church.	Goa, India; 15°30′8″N 73°54′42″E	Cultural: (ii), (iv), (vi)	—	1986	Old Goa was the capital of Portuguese India, a colony that lasted for 450 years until 1961. The site comprises seven churches and convents that were built in the 16th and 17th centuries in the Gothic, Manueline, Mannerist, and Baroque styles, but which were also adapted to suit local techniques and resources. They spread architectural influences to Asian countries where Catholic missions were established. The Basilica of Bom Jesus, where Saint Francis Xavier is buried, is pictured.	
Cultural Landscape and Archaeological Remains of the Bamiyan Valley^{†}	A large niche in a rock with the outline of a human figure.	Bamyan, Afghanistan; 34°49′55″N 67°49′36″E	Cultural: (i), (ii), (iii), (iv), (vi)	159 (390)	2003	Located on one of the branches of the Silk Road, the Bamiyan Valley was a flourishing Buddhist centre between the 1st and 13th centuries and an important pilgrimage site. There are several Buddhist monuments in the area, including statues and carved caves. The exchange of Indian, Hellenistic, Roman, and Sasanian influences resulted in a particular artistic expression, the Gandhara art. Later, during the Islamic period, several fortifications were built, and the Buddhist culture declined. Two colossal standing Buddha statues (the larger one pictured) were destroyed by the Taliban in 2001, an act that resulted in international condemnation. The site has been listed as endangered immediately upon inscription in 2003.	
Dholavira: a Harappan City		Kutch district, Gujarat, India; 23°53′18.27″N 70°12′47.89″E	Cultural: (iii), (iv)	103 (250)	2021	Dholavira was one of the centres of the Harappan Civilisation from the 3rd to mid-2nd millennium BCE, in the Bronze Age. The remains include a walled city and a cemetery, and there are remains of buildings and water management systems. The city's location was chosen because of nearby sources of precious minerals. The city had trade connections with other cities in the region and as far as Mesopotamia. The site was rediscovered in 1968.	
Elephanta Caves		Elephanta Island, Raigad district, Maharashtra, India; 18°58′0″N 72°56′9″E	Cultural: (i), (iii)	—	1987	The cave complex, located on Elephanta Island in Mumbai Harbour, was constructed mainly in the 5th and 6th centuries, with remains of human occupation dating back to the 2nd century BCE. The temples are dedicated to Shiva. The caves are decorated with stone carvings, some of them colossal. A statue of Trimurti Shiva, flanked by the dvarapalas, is pictured.	
Ellora Caves	Heavily decorated religious structure cut from dark rock.	Verul, Aurangabad District, Maharashtra, India; 20°1′35″N 75°10′45″E	Cultural: (i), (iii), (vi)	—	1983	The Ellora Caves comprise 34 temples and monasteries that were cut into a 2 km (1.2 mi) long basalt cliff between the 7th and 11th centuries. As they were built by followers of Buddhism, Hinduism, and Jainism, they illustrate the religious tolerance of the period when they were constructed. The largest temple is the Kailasa Temple (pictured), which is elaborately decorated with sculptures and paintings.	
Fatehpur Sikri		Agra district, Uttar Pradesh, India; 27°5′40″N 77°39′51″E	Cultural: (ii), (iii), (iv)	—	1986	For about a decade in the second half of the 16th century, Fatehpur Sikri was the capital of the Mughal Empire under Emperor Akbar, until the capital was moved to Lahore in 1585 and the city was mostly abandoned. The site comprises a large collection of monuments and temples in the Mughal style, such as the Jama Masjid (the gate to the mosque, the Buland Darwaza, pictured), the Panch Mahal palace, and the Tomb of Salim Chishti.	
Fort and Shalimar Gardens in Lahore	Entrance gate to a fort flanked by two large towers.	Punjab, Pakistan; 31°35′25″N 74°18′35″E	Cultural: (i), (ii), (iii)	—	1981	The Fort (pictured) and the Shalimar Gardens in Lahore are two royal complexes from the Mughal era. The Fort is located at the northwest corner of the Walled City of Lahore and has been destroyed and rebuilt several times during its history. The extant monuments date from the 16th century, during the reign of Akbar. The Shalimar Gardens were constructed under the emperor Shah Jahan in 1642. They are an example of Mughal gardens which were influenced by Persian and Islamic traditions.	
Golden Temple of Dambulla	Stupa and statues of bodhisattvas inside a cave.	Matale District, Central Province, Sri Lanka; 7°51′24″N 80°38′57″E	Cultural: (i), (vi)	—	1991	The cave monastery is the largest and best preserved Buddhist complex in Sri Lanka and an important pilgrimage site. It has been inhabited by monks since the 3rd century BCE. It comprises five shrines constructed in natural caves. The shrines went through a series of renovations, the present form dates to the 18th century. They contain outstanding examples of religious art, including statues and wall paintings in the style of the Kandy art school.	
Great Himalayan National Park		Kullu region, Himachal Pradesh,India; 31°44′N 77°33′E	Natural: (x)	117,100 (289,000)	2014	The national park covers habitats from alpine peaks of the Himalayas above 6,000 m (20,000 ft) to alpine meadows and riverine forests below 2,000 m (6,600 ft). In total, there are 25 types of forests recorded, and they have rich floral and faunal assemblies, including numerous species of birds, mammals, reptiles, and insects. It is home to endangered species such as the western tragopan and musk deer.	
Great Living Chola Temples		Tamil Nadu, India; 10°46′59″N 79°7′57″E	Cultural: (ii), (iii)	22 (54); buffer zone 17 (42)	1987 (Note: Extended in 2004 to include the Brihadisvara Temple Complex in Gangaikondacholapuram and the Airavatesvara Temple Complex in Darasuram and name change from Brihadisvara Temple, Thanjavur to the present name.)	Composed by three sites: Brihadisvara Temple, Thanjavur; Airavatesvara Temple, Darasuram; Brihadivara Temple, Gangaikonda	
Group of Monuments at Hampi	Ruins of a large decorated building.	Bellary district, Karnataka, India; 15°18′52″N 76°28′18″E	Cultural: (i), (iii), (iv)	—	1986	Hampi was the capital of the Vijayanagara Empire until its abandonment after its sacking and pillaging by the Deccan sultanates in 1565. For about 200 years, it was a prosperous multi-cultural city that left several monuments in the Dravidian style as well as the Indo-Islamic style. The remains include religious and secular buildings and defensive structures. The Vitthala Temple is pictured. A minor boundary modification of the site took place in 2012. Between 1999 and 2006, the site was listed as endangered due to risks posed by increased traffic and new constructions.	
Group of Monuments at Mahabalipuram	Ruins of a sandstone building with columns.	Chingleput district, Tamil Nadu, India; 12°37′0″N 80°11′30″E	Cultural: (i), (ii), (iii), (vi)	—	1984	The monuments around the town of Mamallapuram were built in the 7th and 8th centuries, under the Pallava dynasty. There are different types of monuments: the rathas, which are chariot-shaped temples (Dharmaraja Ratha); the mandapas (rock-cut temples); rock reliefs, including the giant Descent of the Ganges; Shore Temple (pictured) and other temples and archaeological remains. The artistic expression of the monuments was influential in the broader region, including Cambodia, Vietnam, and Java.	
Group of Monuments at Pattadakal		Badami, Bijapur district, Karnataka, India; 15°56′54″N 75°49′0″E	Cultural: (iii), (iv)	5.56 (13.7); buffer zone 113 (280)	1987	This site comprises nine Hindu temples and one Jain temple that were built in the 7th and 8th centuries under the Chalukya dynasty. They were constructed in the Badami Chalukya style that blends influences from northern and southern India. The Temple of Virupaksha is pictured.	
Hill Forts of Rajasthan		Rajasthan, India; 24°53′00″N 74°38′46″E	Cultural: (ii), (iii)	—	2013	Composed by six sites: Amber Fort, Jaipur district; Ranthambore Fort, Sawai Madhopur district; Gagron Fort, Jhalawar district; Chittor Fort, Chittorgarh district; Kumbhalgarh, Rajsamand district; Jaisalmer Fort, Jaisalmer district	
Historic City of Ahmadabad		Ahmedabad, Ahmedabad District, Gujarat, India; 23°08′06″N 72°21′06″E	Cultural: (ii), (v)	535.7 (1323); buffer zone 395 (976)	2017	The city of Ahmedabad was founded by Ahmad Shah I in 1411 to serve as the capital of the Gujarat Sultanate. It was the meeting place of many religions (Hinduism, Islam, Buddhism, Jainism, Christianity, Zoroastrianism, and Judaism), which resulted in a unique urban fabric. The architecture is based on timber, and the typical neighborhoods are called pols, densely packed traditional houses with gated streets. Important buildings from the Sultanate period include the Bhadra Fort city walls, Teen Darwaza, Rani Sipri's Mosque, Sidi Bashir Mosque, Sidi Saiyyed Mosque (pictured) and Jama Mosque and other numerous mosques, tombs, and shrines.	
Historical Monuments at Makli, Thatta	Ruins of an octagonal building crowned by a cupola.	Sindh, Pakistan; 24°46′0″N 67°54′0″E	Cultural: (iii)	—	1981	Makli is a large necropolis in the city of Thatta. It was active between the 14th and 18th centuries. The monuments and mausoleums are built from high quality stone, brick, and glazed tiles. Tombs of famous saints and rulers including Jam Nizamuddin II and Isa Khan (pictured) are still preserved and are fine examples of Mughal architecture influenced by local styles.	
Historic Mosque City of Bagerhat	Building of red bricks with a roof consisting of many white domes. There are small round towers on the corners of the building each crowned by a white cupola.	Bagerhat District, Khulna Division, Bangladesh; 22°40′0″N 89°48′0″E	Cultural: (iv)	—	1985	The city of Bagerhat was founded in the 15th century by Khan Jahan Ali under the name Khalifatabad. It contains over 300 mosques, public buildings, mausoleums, bridges, and water tanks, mostly constructed from baked brick. The city represents some of the most significant examples of early Muslim architecture in Bengal, including the Tomb of Khan Jahan and the Sixty Dome Mosque (pictured). The architectural style is unique to the site. After the death of the founder, the city got covered by the jungle.	
Humayun's Tomb, Delhi		Delhi, India; 28°35′36″N 77°15′2″E	Cultural: (ii), (iv)	—	1993	The tomb of the Mughal emperor Humayun was constructed in the 1560s and represents the first example of a garden tomb on the Indian subcontinent, introducing the elements of Persian gardens. The monumental double-domed mausoleum represents a leap in Mughal architecture and is an architectural predecessor of the Taj Mahal. The complex includes several smaller tombs from the period. A minor boundary modification took place in 2016.	
Jaipur City	Hawa Mahal	Jaipur, India; 26°55′27.4″N 75°49′18.7″E	Cultural: (ii), (iv), (vi)	—	2019	Jaipur was founded by the Rajput ruler Jai Singh II in 1727. The city was built with a grid plan, inspired by ancient Hindu and Western ideals, in a departure from the medieval architecture of the region. It was a strong trade centre and home to craftsmen and artists. Important buildings and sites include the Hawa Mahal palace (pictured), Govind Dev Ji Temple, City Palace, and Jantar Mantar, which is listed as a separate World Heritage Site.	
Kathmandu Valley	Streetscene with various characteristically shaped temple buildings.	Kathmandu Valley, Nepal; 27°42′14″N 85°18′31″E	Cultural: (iii), (iv), (vi)	167 (410); buffer zone 70 (170)	1979 (Note: Minor modification of boundaries in 2006.)	The site has been listed as endangered 2003–2007 due to the partial or substantial loss of the traditional elements of six out of seven monument zones and resulting general loss of authenticity and integrity of the whole property.	
Kakatiya Rudreshwara (Ramappa) Temple, Telangana		Mulugu district, Telangana, India; 18°15′32.88″N 79°56′35.54″E	Cultural: (i), (iii)	593 (1,470); buffer zone 6,627 (16,380)	2021	The Hindu temple, dedicated to Shiva, was constructed in the first half of the 13th century under the Kakatiya dynasty. It is decorated with stone carvings and sculptures in granite and dolerite that depict regional dance customs. In line with Hindu practices, the temple is constructed in a way that blends harmonically with the environment.	
Kaziranga National Park		Assam, India; 26°40′N 93°25′E	Natural: (ix), (x)	42,996 (106,250)	1985	Kaziranga is located in the floodplains of the Brahmaputra River. It is one of the best wildlife sanctuaries in the world, home to the world's largest population of the Indian rhinoceros (pictured), as well as tigers, Asian elephants, wild water buffalo, and the Ganges river dolphin. The wetlands are important for migratory bird species.	
Keoladeo National Park		Rajasthan, India; 27°9′32″N 77°30′31″E	Natural: (x)	2,873 (7,100)	1985	Initially a duck-hunting reserve for Maharajas, Keoladeo is a man-made and man-maintained wetland. It is important both for migratory and resident birds, especially waterbirds. Over 350 species of birds have been recorded, including 15 species of herons, the Siberian crane, and the greater spotted eagle. Pictured here is a group of bar-headed geese and demoiselle cranes flying together in the park. The park is also protected under the Ramsar Convention.	
Khajuraho Group of Monuments		Madhya Pradesh, India; 24°51′8″N 79°55′20″E	Cultural: (i), (iii)	—	1986	This site comprises 23 temples, both Hindu and Jain, that were built in the 10th and 11th centuries, during the Chandela dynasty. The temples are built in the Nagara style. They are richly decorated with stone carvings and sculptures that depict sacred and secular motifs, including depictions of domestic life, musicians, dancers, and amorous couples. A detail from the Lakshmana Temple is pictured.	
Khangchendzonga National Park		Sikkim, India; 27°45′53″N 88°22′38″E	Mixed: (iii), (vi), (vii), (x)	178,400 (440.8); buffer zone 114,712 (283.459)	2016	The national park is located around Mount Khangchendzonga, the world's third highest mountain (8,586 m (28,169 ft)). It is a sacred mountain in Tibetan Buddhism, where the area is considered a beyul, a sacred hidden land. It is home to ethnically very diverse Sikkimese communities. From the natural perspective, the area comprises various habitats, from high mountains with glaciers to old-growth forests, and is rich in animal and plant species.	
Lumbini, the Birthplace of the Lord Buddha	A large tree next to a water filled pool.	Rupandehi District, Lumbini Zone, Nepal; 27°28′8″N 83°16′34″E	Cultural: (iii), (vi)	1.95 (4.8); buffer zone 23 (57)	1997	Lumbini, where the founder of the world religion of Buddhism, Gautama Buddha, was born in 623 BC. Lumbini is regarded as one of the holiest places in Buddhism and it features pilgrimage sites dating back to the 3rd century BC. The complex includes the Lumbini pillar inscription, Maya Devi Temple, and Shakya Tank where Maya bathed before giving birth to Buddha.	
Mahabodhi Temple Complex at Bodh Gaya		Bihar, India; 24°41′43″N 84°59′38″E	Cultural: (i), (ii), (iii), (iv), (vi)	4.86 (12.0)	2002	The Buddhist temple complex marks the site where Buddha is said to have attained enlightenment under the Bodhi Tree. The present temple dates to the 5th and 6th centuries CE (during the Gupta period) and was built upon a previous structure commissioned by Emperor Ashoka in the 3rd century BCE. The temple is 50 m (160 ft) high and made of brick. It had a substantial influence on the development of architecture in the following centuries. After centuries of abandonment and neglect, the temple was extensively restored in the 19th century.	
Manas Wildlife Sanctuary		Assam, India; 26°43′30″N 91°1′50″E	Natural: (vii), (ix), (x)	39,100 (97,000)	1985	The sanctuary along the Manas River covers grasslands on floodplains and forests, both in lowlands and in hills. The area is a biodiversity hotspot and home to several endangered species, including the Indian rhinoceros, Asian elephant (pictured), wild water buffalo, tiger, sloth bear, pygmy hog, Gee's golden langur, and Bengal florican. The forests are constantly being renewed after floods and changes in the river courses. Between 1992 and 2011, the site was listed as endangered due to poaching and the activities of Bodo militias.	
Maratha Military Landscapes of India		Maharashtra and Tamil Nadu, India; 20°43′21″N 73°56′33″E	Cultural: (iv), (vi)	1,578 (3,900); buffer zone 96,500 (238,000)	2025		
Minaret and Archaeological Remains of Jam^{†}	A tall minaret in a river valley. At the top of the nearby mountains there are other, smaller structures.	Ghōr, Afghanistan; 34°23′48″N 64°30′58″E	Cultural: (ii), (iii), (iv)	70 (170)	2002	The site has been listed as endangered since its inscription due to lack of legal protection, lack of protection measure or management plan and the generally poor condition of the site.	
Moidams – the Mound-Burial system of the Ahom Dynasty	Several tumuli in a forest, tourists walking around	India; 26°58′01″N 94°52′01″E	Cultural: (iii),(iv)	—	2024	Charaideo was the capital of the Ahom kingdom (1228–1826), and the tumuli were the burial sites of the royals and nobility. The tumuli create an undulating landscape reminiscent of hills, in line with the spiritual beliefs of the Tai-Ahom people.	
Mountain Railways of India	A small steam locomotive with three blue carriages.	India; 11°30′37″N 76°56′9″E	Cultural: (ii), (iv)	89 (220); buffer zone 645 (1,590)	1999 (Note: Extended in 2005 to include the Nilgiri Mountain Railway and in 2008 to include the Kalka–Shimla Railway. Name change in 2005 from Darjeeling Himalayan Railway to the present name.)	Composed by three lines: Darjeeling Himalayan Railway; Nilgiri Mountain Railway; Kalka-Shimla Railway	
Nanda Devi and Valley of Flowers National Parks		Uttarakhand, India; 30°43′N 79°40′E	Natural: (vii), (x)	71,783 (177,380); buffer zone 514,286 (1,270,830)	1988 (Note: Extended in 2005???)	This site comprises two areas in the West Himalayas, the Valley of Flowers National Park (pictured) and the Nanda Devi National Park. There are different types of high-altitude habitats, from high mountain peaks (Nanda Devi at 7,817 m (25,646 ft) is India's second-highest mountain) to alpine meadows. In addition to numerous mountain plant species, the area is home to the Asiatic black bear, snow leopard, brown bear, and bharal. Nanda Devi NP was originally listed alone in 1988; the Valley of Flowers NP was added in 2005.	
Old Town of Galle and its Fortifications		Galle, Southern Province, Sri Lanka; 6°1′17″N 80°13′7″E	Cultural: (iv)	—	1988	The town of Galle was founded by the Portuguese who built the first fortifications there at the end of the 16th century. The Dutch East India Company took over the fort in 1640 and constructed a bastioned stone wall, giving the town its present layout. Galle saw its peak development in the 18th century, when it housed 500 families and had large administrative buildings and warehouses. It was handed over to the British in 1796. The town is the best preserved example of a European-built fortified city in South and Southeast Asia. The architecture represents a fusion of European and regional traditions between the 16th and 19th centuries. One of the important features is a sewer system that used seawater for flushing.	
Qutb Minar and its Monuments, Delhi		Delhi, India; 28°31′33″N 77°11′7″E	Cultural: (iv)	—	1993	The complex comprises several early Islamic India monuments from the 13th and 14th centuries when the Delhi Sultanate established power there. They include the Qutb Minar, a 72.5 m (238 ft)-high minaret (pictured), the Alai Darwaza gateway, the Quwwat-ul-Islam Mosque where several stone pillars from previous Hindu temples were repurposed, the Iron pillar, and several tombs and other monuments.	
Rani-ki-Vav (the Queen's Stepwell) at Patan, Gujarat		Patan, Gujarat, India; 23°51′32″N 72°06′06″E	Cultural: (i)(iv)	4.68 ha	2014	Rani-ki-Vav is one of the finest examples of a stepwell, an elaborate type of well where groundwater is accessed through several levels of stairs. It was constructed in the 11th century, during the Chaulukya dynasty, on the banks of the Saraswati River in the city of Patan. It has seven levels, each decorated with stone carvings and sculptures depicting religious and secular themes and literary works. After the change in the river course in the 13th century, it was no longer in use and got covered with silt, which allowed for its preservation.	
Red Fort Complex		Delhi, India; 28°39′20″N 77°14′27″E	Cultural: (ii), (iii), (vi)	98 (240); buffer zone 100 (250)	2007	The Red Fort was built under Mughal emperor Shah Jahan in the mid-17th century. It represents the zenith of Mughal architecture, blending the elements of Indo-Persian culture with Timurid elements. Its architecture had a strong influence on later palaces and gardens in the region. The Red Fort was also the setting of historical events; it was sacked and partially repurposed by the British, and it was the site where the independence of India was first celebrated. The Delhi Gate is pictured.	
Rock Shelters of Bhimbetka		Madhya Pradesh, India; 22°55′40″N 77°35′0″E	Cultural: (iii), (v)	1,893 (4,680); buffer zone 10,280 (25,400)	2003	This site comprises five clusters of rock shelters in the foothills of the Vindhya Range. They contain rock paintings from the hunter-gatherer societies of the Mesolithic to the historical period. The nearby villages still maintain some cultural practices similar to those depicted in the paintings.	
Rohtas Fort	Ruins of the gate to a fortress.	Jhelum, Punjab, Pakistan; 32°57′45″N 73°35′20″E	Cultural: (ii), (iv)	—	1997	The fort was constructed under Sher Shah Suri, following his victory over the Mughal Emperor Humayun in 1541. It is an exceptional example of early Islamic military architecture in the gunpowder era, integrating artistic traditions from Turkey and the Indian subcontinent. It served as a model for the later Mughal architecture. It was never conquered in battle and remains intact today.	
Ruins of the Buddhist Vihara at Paharpur	Ruins of a structure of red stone now resembling a small hill or mound.	Naogaon District, Rajshahi Division, Bangladesh; 25°2′0″N 88°59′0″E	Cultural: (i), (ii), (vi)	—	1985	Somapura Mahavihara, a Buddhist vihāra, or monastery, dates to the 8th century. It was an important centre of Mahayana Buddhism in the region until the 12th century, and is the second largest Buddhist monastery south of the Himalayas. It was decorated with stone and terracotta sculptures and carvings. It influenced the construction of temples in Myanmar, Java, and Cambodia.	
Sacred City of Anuradhapura		Anuradhapura District, North Central Province, Sri Lanka; 8°20′0″N 80°23′0″E	Cultural: (ii), (iii), (vi)	—	1982	Anuradhapura was the first capital of Sri Lanka and a Buddhist spiritual centre. It was founded in the 4th century BCE. It was attacked by the Tamils in the 2nd century BCE and sacked by the Pandyas in the 9th century CE. The monuments were subsequently restored but the city was finally destroyed in 993 by the Chola emperor Rajaraja I and the capital was moved to Polonnaruwa. In the following centuries it was overgrown by jungle. Monuments that remain today include the Abhayagiri vihāra (pictured) and the Ruwanwelisaya stupa, as well as the Jaya Sri Maha Bodhi, a tree that grew from a cutting from the Bodhi Tree under which Buddha is said to have attained enlightenment.	
Sacred City of Kandy	Administrative or religious building.	Central Province, Sri Lanka; 7°17′37″N 80°38′25″E	Cultural: (iv), (vi)	—	1988	Kandy was founded in the 14th century and served as the capital of the eponymous kingdom from 1592 to 1815, when the British entered it. It remains the religious Buddhist capital of Sri Lanka and a pilgrimage centre. Following the former tradition of moving the relic when changing the capital, the relic of the tooth of Buddha is stored in the Temple of the Tooth (pictured), with the current structure dating to the mid-18th century. Other monuments include the Royal Palace and several Buddhist temples.	
Sacred Ensembles of the Hoysalas		Karnataka, India; 13°12′44.83″N 75°59′38.66″E	Cultural: (i), (ii), (iv)	1,047 (2,590); buffer zone 19,587 (48,400)	2023	Composed by three sites: Chennakeshava Temple, Belur; Hoysaleshvara Temple, Halebid; Chennakesava Temple, Somanathapura	
Sagarmatha National Park		Solukhumbu District, Sagarmatha Zone, Nepal; 27°57′55″N 86°54′47″E	Natural: (vii)	124,400 (307,000)	1979	Sagarmatha National Park encompasses the mountains of the Great Himalayan Range which includes the Earth's highest mountain above sea level, Mount Everest (known in Nepal as Sagarmatha), and the Sacred Himalayan Landscape, the transboundary landscape in the eastern Himalayas. The park covers an area of 124,400 hectares (307,000 acres) of land and 20 villages with 6000 Sherpas who have lived in the area for the last four centuries.	
Santiniketan		West Bengal, India; 23°40′49″N 87°41′5.9″E	Cultural: (iv), (vi)	36 (89); buffer zone 53,773 (132,880)	2023	Santiniketan was founded as an ashram by Debendranath Tagore in the second half of the 19th century and then developed into a university town for Visva-Bharati University. It is connected to the life and philosophy of Debendranath's son Rabindranath Tagore, the leading figure of the Bengali Renaissance. The prayer hall is pictured.	
Sinharaja Forest Reserve		Sabaragamuwa and Southern Province, Sri Lanka; 6°25′N 80°30′E	Natural: (ix), (x)	8,864 (21,900)	1988	Sinharaja Forest Reserve comprises some of Sri Lanka's last relatively undisturbed rain forests. The flora is a relic of the ancient Gondwanaland supercontinent, and it is important for the study of biological evolution and continental drift. Valleys and lower areas are covered by Dipterocarpus species while secondary forest and shrubs cover areas where the original forest has been removed. The area is home to numerous endemic species of birds, mammals, butterflies, and amphibians.	
Sundarbans National Park		West Bengal, India; 21°56′42″N 88°53′45″E	Natural: (ix), (x)	133,010 (328,700)	1987	The national park covers the Indian part of the Sundarbans, the delta of the Ganges and Brahmaputra rivers. It is the world's largest and richest mangrove forest, with about 78 recorded mangrove species. It is a biodiversity hotspot, home to a large population of Bengal tigers (one pictured), as well as an important habitat for the Irrawaddy dolphin and Ganges river dolphin, several species of birds and sea turtles. In Bangladesh, the Sundarbans is listed as a separate World Heritage Site.	
Sun Temple, Konârak	Decorated wheel in stone relief.	Puri district, Odisha, India; 19°53′15″N 86°5′41″E	Cultural: (i), (iii), (vi)	11 (27)	1984	This Hindu temple was built in the 13th century and is one of the finest examples of Kalinga architecture. It represents the chariot of the solar deity Surya: on the outer sides, it has 24 wheels carved of stone and richly decorated, being pulled by six horses. Other decorative motifs include lions, musicians, dancers, and erotic scenes.	
Taj Mahal	A white building with a big and several smaller cupolas framed by four white minarets at each corner.	Agra, Uttar Pradesh, India; 27°10′27″N 78°2′32″E	Cultural: (i)	—	1983	The Taj Mahal is considered the finest example of Indo-Islamic architecture. It was built in Agra on the bank of the Yamuna river as a mausoleum of Mumtaz Mahal, the Persian wife of the Mughal emperor Shah Jahan, between 1631 and 1648. It was designed by Ustad Ahmad Lahori and built in white marble inlaid with precious and semi-precious stones. The tomb is surrounded by four free-standing minarets. The complex also includes the main gate, a mosque, a guesthouse, and surrounding gardens.	
Taxila		Punjab, Pakistan; 33°46′45″N 72°53′15″E	Cultural: (iii), (vi)	—	1980	Taxila, which was already inhabited in the Neolithic, was an important Buddhist centre of learning between the 5th century BCE and 2nd century CE. The archaeological site comprises the remains of four settlements which reveal the urban development of the site. The city was located on one of the branches of the Silk Road and was influenced by the Achaemenid Empire and by the Greeks. The Bhir Mound is associated with the entrance of Alexander the Great into Taxila in 326 BCE. Some of the monuments include the Jaulian monastery, the Mohra Muradu stupa, the Dharmarajika Stupa, the Jandial complex, and the city of Sirkap (the remains of a stupa at the site pictured).	
The Architectural Work of Le Corbusier, an Outstanding Contribution to the Modern Movement		Argentina*; Belgium*; France; Germany*; India*; Japan*; Switzerland*; 30°45′32″N 76°48′18″E	Cultural: (i)(ii)(vi)	—	2016		
The Jantar Mantar, Jaipur		Jaipur, Rajasthan, India; 26°55′29″N 75°49′30″E	Cultural: (iii), (iv)	1.87 (4.6); buffer zone 15 (37)	2010	The Jantar Mantar in Jaipur is India's most significant historic astronomical observatory. It dates from the early 18th century and was built by Rajput king Sawai Jai Singh. There are about 20 astronomical instruments that were designed and built for naked eye observations of the positions of stars and planets. It also served as a meeting point for different scientific cultures.	
The Sundarbans	Boat on a river in a densely forested plain.	Khulna Division, Bangladesh; 21°57′0″N 89°11′0″E	Natural: (ix), (x)	139,500 (345,000)	1997	The national park covers the Bangladeshi part of the Sundarbans, the delta of the Ganges and Brahmaputra rivers. It is the world's largest and richest mangrove forest, with about 78 recorded mangrove species. It is a biodiversity hotspot, home to a large population of Bengal tigers, as well as an important habitat for the Irrawaddy dolphin and Ganges river dolphin, several species of birds and sea turtles. Three sanctuaries are listed. In India, the Sundarbans National Park is listed as a separate World Heritage Site.	
Victorian Gothic and Art Deco Ensembles of Mumbai		Mumbai, Maharashtra, India; 18°55′47.3″N 72°49′48.3″E	Cultural: (ii), (iv)	66.34; buffer zone 378.78	2018	This site comprises two assemblies of buildings in Mumbai from the British Empire era. Public buildings in the Victorian Gothic style from the second half of the 19th century adapted Gothic Revival elements for the Indian climate, introducing features such as balconies and verandas. The Bombay High Court building is pictured. The Art Deco buildings date to the early 20th century and include cinema halls and apartment buildings. See also Art Deco in Mumbai.	
Western Ghats	Western Ghats at Kudremukh National Park, Karnataka.	India; 8°31′47″N 77°14′59″E	Natural: (ix), (x)	795,315 (1,965,270)	2012	Composed by 39 national parks or protected areas spread between the states of Maharashtra, Karnataka, Tamil Nadu and Kerala	

=== UNESCO sites for South Asia compared to other Asian regions ===
The number of UNESCO sites of South Asia is contrasted by the number of sites Southeast and East Asia. South Asian countries are noted with 'SA' and in brown colour.

== See also ==
- List of World Heritage Sites in Afghanistan
- List of World Heritage Sites in Bangladesh
- List of World Heritage Sites in India
- List of World Heritage Sites in Nepal
- List of World Heritage Sites in Pakistan
- List of World Heritage Sites in Sri Lanka
