= Bibliography of Afghanistan =

This is a select bibliography of English-language books (including translations) and journal articles written about Afghanistan.

- Arjomand, Said – Constitutional Politics in the Middle East: With Special Reference to , and Pakistan.
- Baker, P. H. B. and F. R. Allchin - Shahr-i Zohak and the History of the Baiyan Valley, Afghanistan.
- Barfield, Thomas – Afghanistan: A Cultural and Political History.
- Capian, Richard – A New Trusteeship? The International Administration of War-Torn Territories.
- Coll, Steve - Ghost Wars: The Secret History of the CIA, Afghanistan, and Bin Laden, from the Soviet Invasion to September 10, 2001.
- Countries of the World and Their Leaders Yearbook 1983: Vol. 1, Chiefs of State and Cabinet Members of Foreign Governments; Status of the World's Nations; U.S. Embassies, Consulates, and Foreign Service Posts; Background Notes: Afghanistan-Luxembourg. Vol. 2, Background Notes: Macau-Zimbabwe; Foreign Travel; International Treaty Organization; Climates of the World.
- Countries of the World and Their Leaders Yearbook 1984: Vol. 1, Chiefs of State and Cabinet Members of Foreign Governments; Status of the World's Nations; U.S. Embassies, Consulates, and Foreign Service Posts; Background Notes: Afghanistan-Luxembourg. Vol. 2, Background Notes: Macau-Zimbabwe; Foreign Travel; International Treaty Organization; Climates of the World.
- Countries of the World and Their Leaders Yearbook 1985: Vol. 1, Chiefs of State and Cabinet Members of Foreign Governments; Status of the World's Nations; U.S. Embassies, Consulates, and Foreign Service Posts; Background Notes: Afghanistan-Luxembourg. Vol. 2, Background Notes: Macau-Zimbabwe; Foreign Travel; International Treaty Organization; Climates of the World.
- Dorronsoro, Gilles - Revolution Unending: Afghanistan, 1979 to the Present.
- Dupree, Louis - Afghanistan.
- Elphinstone, Monstuart - Account of the Kingdom of Cabul and its Dependencies in Persia and India.
- Freedman, Robert O. - Moscow and the Middle East: Soviet Policy since the Invasion of Afghanistan.
- Friedman, Norman – Terrorism, Afghanistan and America's New Way of War.
- Fukuyama, Francis – Nation-Building: Beyond Afghanistan and Iraq.
- Gregory, Derek - The Colonial Present, Afghanistan, Palestine, Iraq.
- Holohan, Anne – Networks of Democracy: Lessons from Kosovo for Afghanistan, Iraq, and Beyond.
- Holt, F. L. – Into the Land of Bones: Alexander the Great in Afghanistan.
- Imamuddin, S. M. – A Modern History of the Middle East and North Africa: A Concise Modern History of the Muslim Countries from Afghanistan to Morocco Covering the Period from the Downfall of the Abbasids (1258) to the Eve of World War II (1939) and the Growth of Modern States in the Muslim Countries.
- Johnson, Chris and Jolyon Leslie - Afghanistan: The Mirage of Peace.
- Kapur, Harish - Soviet Russia and Asia, 1917-1927: A Study of Soviet Policy towards Turkey, Iran, and Afghanistan.
- The Middle East, 1948. Aden, Afghanistan, Anglo-Egyptian Sudan, Cyprus, Egypt, Iran, Iraq, Syria and the Lebanon, Palestine, Saudi Arabia, Transjordan, Turkey, with a Section on the League of Arab States.
- Nojumi, Neamatollah – The Rise of the Taliban in Afghanistan: Mass Mobilization, Civil War, and the Future of the Region.
- Nollau, Gunther and Hans Jurgen Wiehe - Russia's South Flank: Soviet Operations in Iran, Turkey and Afghanistan.
- Omrani, Bijan & Leeming, Matthew Afghanistan: A Companion and Guide. Odyssey Publications, 2nd Edition, 2011. ISBN 962-217-816-2.
- Rasanayagam, Angelo – Afghanistan: A Modern History.
- Rogers, Paul - A War on Terror: Afghanistan and After.
- Rothstein, Hy S. – Afghanistan and the Troubled Future of Unconventional Warfare.
- Schurmann, H. F. - The Mongols of Afghanistan, an Ethnography of the Moghols and Related Peoples of Afghanistan.
- Shahrani, Nazif and Charlie Nairn – The Kirghiz of Afghanistan: TV Film.
- Singhal, D. P. - India and Afghanistan 1876-1907: A Study in Diplomatic Relations.
- Sinno, Abdulkader H. – Organizations at War in Afghanistan and Beyond.
- Vining, Edward P. - An Inglorious Columbus: or Evidence that Hwui Shan and a Party of Buddhist monks from Afghanistan Discovered America in the Fifth Century A.D.
- Weaver, Mary Anne – Pakistan: In the Shadow of Jihad and Afghanistan.
- Weigand, Florian – Waiting for Dignity: Legitimacy and Authority in Afghanistan.
- Wilber, Donald M. – Annotated Bibliography of Afghanistan.
- Zahab, Mariam and Oliver Roy – Islamist Networks: The Afghan-Pakistan Connection.
- Jones, Schuyler (1992) Afghanistan. Vol. 135 in the World Bibliographical Series. Clio Press, Oxford.
- Ahmad, M. M. "The Lost Tribes of Israel." The Muslim Sunrise (1991).

== See also ==
- Topic overview:
  - Afghanistan
  - Outline of Afghanistan
