= Health in Afghanistan =

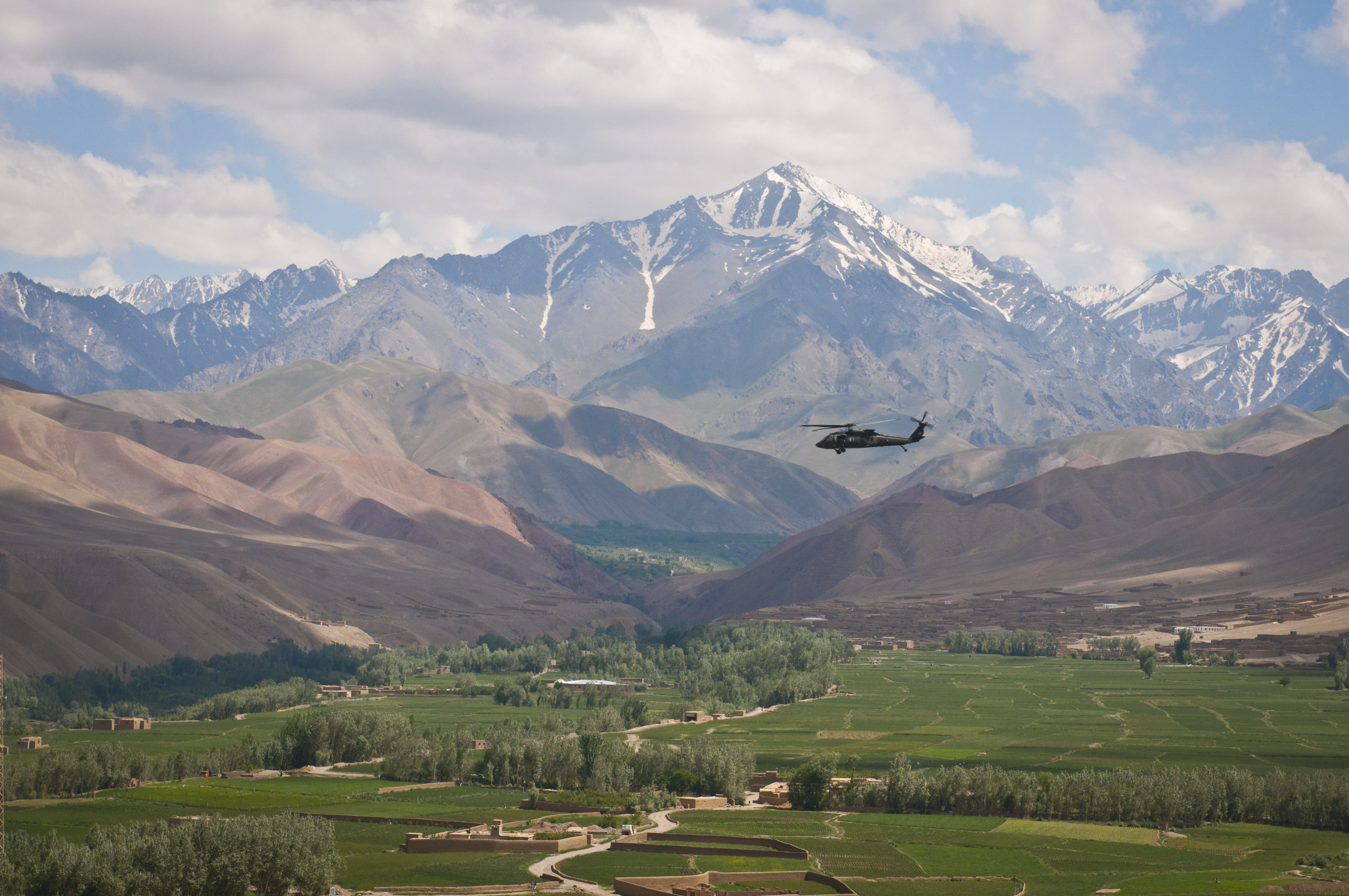
Afghanistan's snow-covered Baba Mountains in June 2012, where winter is generally long and cold.

Health in Afghanistan remains weak but steadily improving. It has been negatively affected by the nation's environmental issues and the decades of war since 1978. The Ministry of Public Health oversees all matters concerning the public health in all provinces of Afghanistan.

Because much of the country gets very cold during the winter, the number of people getting sick in that season is always higher. Some Afghans reside in modern homes and apartments in the cities while others traditionally live in rural areas. Over 82% of the entire population has access to clean drinking water, with urban dwellers at 99%.

Afghanistan is one of the only two remaining countries that has not eradicated polio. Nearly 100,000 of its citizens face death each year from malnutrition and foodborne illness. In the same period about 16,000 die from various forms of cancer, and a similar number from tuberculosis. Over 1,000 die from diabetes and the same many in traffic collisions. Health officials stated in 2020 that around 5,000 Afghans died from air pollution, which has long been a problem in Kabul.

== Background ==
Afghanistan became a member of the World Health Organization (WHO) on April 19, 1948. It has an estimated population of around 50 million people. Of this, approximately 45 million are in the country while the remaining 5 million or so are temporarily staying in Iran, Pakistan, and elsewhere around the world.

== Health care system ==
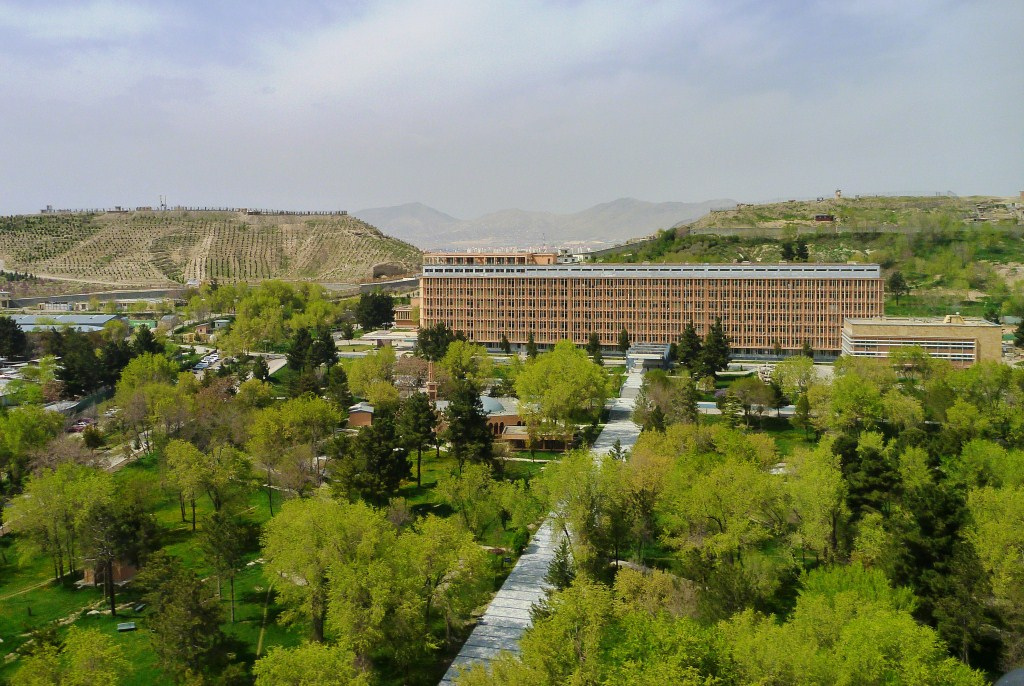
The Daoud Khan Military Hospital in Kabul is one of the largest and well-known hospitals in Afghanistan

=== Facilities ===
Hospitals, clinics, dentist offices, and pharmacies can be found in all 34 provinces and most districts of Afghanistan. Major surgeries are performed in some of these Afghan hospitals. About 87 percent of the population has access to basic healthcare, and citizens themselves pay approximately 75% of healthcare costs directly. Despite having 200 pharmaceutical companies in the country, most medicines are still imported from other countries.

=== Personnel ===
Afghanistan has one of the lowest health worker density in the Eastern Mediterranean Region, with a ratio of 10.3 medical doctors, nurses and midwives per 10,000 people, considerably below the threshold for critical shortage of 23 health professionals per 10,000. It was reported in 2007 that Afghanistan's health workforce shortage is a result of the continued war in the country since 1978, including the historic under-investment in education and training, migration, lack of infrastructure, and equipment and poor remuneration. Other challenges also include lack of opportunities for career advancement, staff absenteeism, moonlighting, and weak management. Cultural and socio-economic barriers have also contributed to the overall shortage as well as gender and geographic imbalances in the health workforce. As per the global pattern, many health workers (especially specialists and female doctors) prefer to work in Kabul and other large cities for a notably better standard of life. In addition, policies limiting female education affecting health workforce production are still felt and encountered today, especially in more rural provinces.

The shortage of female health professionals has long been seen as an access and comfort issue for female patients in Afghanistan. The shortage of such professionals is also a quality of care issue for female patients. Female health professionals in Afghanistan may be more sensitive to the needs of female patients, and adult females can interact freely with each other, whereas sex discordant adults face constraints in their interactions that may hinder the ability of a provider to deliver high quality healthcare.

=== Governance and administration ===
Latest reports say 700,000 orphans, widows and people with disabilities are registered with the Ministry of Martyrs and Disabled Affairs.

== Health status ==
A mural promoting breast feeding in Bamyan Province

Despite being one of the least developed countries, Afghanistan has experienced major health improvements in the last decades, with life expectancy increasing from 56 to 66 years. Maternal mortality rate was reduced by half, with the rate estimated at 521 deaths per 100,000 live births, and the child mortality rate estimated at 55 deaths per 1,000 live births.

=== Maternal mortality ===
In the past, Afghanistan had one of the highest maternal mortality rates in the world. It was estimated at 1,640 deaths per 100,000 live births in 1980. It has steadily decreased to 521 deaths per 100,000 live births. The child and infant mortality rates have also been steadily decreasing.

Time	Maternal Mortality
1980	1,640
1988	1,280
1996	1,180
2004	792
2013	400
2023	521

The country is currently seeing millions of its citizens returning from neighboring Iran and Pakistan. UNICEF has warned in 2022 that up to 1 million Afghan children were at risk of death from malnutrition. According to the World Food Programme, more than half the population faced acute hunger, with nearly 9 million residents one step away from famine. The provinces of Kandahar and Paktika have been more affected by the latest food shortage crises. Due to this unprecedented food crisis, drought, and disruptions to vital health and nutrition services, children across Afghanistan were increasingly vulnerable to disease and illness.

== Disease burden and risk factors ==
=== Communicable diseases ===
==== Crimean–Congo hemorrhagic fever ====
Crimean–Congo hemorrhagic fever (or simply Congo fever) has killed over a hundred Afghans in recent years. WHO has reported 178 cases of Congo fever in 2025.

==== Dengue ====
Cases of dengue fever have been reported in Afghanistan, mainly in Nangarhar Province where 1,081 hospital patients were tested positive for having dengue virus.

==== Hepatitis ====
Latest reports indicate that approximately 15,000 people may be infected with hepatitis in Afghanistan. At least 6,000 cases were reported in 2023. The disease has killed 140 people in 2024.

- Hepatitis A

Hepatitis A works by inhibiting the liver from functioning properly. Symptoms generally include jaundice, fatigue, loss of appetite, while some victims may experience diarrhea. Furthermore, symptoms will appear 2–6 weeks after an individual has come into contact with the hepatitis A virus.

- Hepatitis B

Health officials have reported in 2017 that about 150,000 people nationwide were infected with Hepatitis B virus (HBV).

- Hepatitis C

Hepatitis C virus (HCV) is a blood-borne pathogen associated with several morbidities and mortality. HCV prevalence in the population at large in Afghanistan appears to be around 1%. HCV prevalence among people who inject drugs is substantial with evidence of regional and temporal variation. HCV prevention efforts in Afghanistan should focus on expanding access to and coverage of harm reduction services among people who inject drugs and prisoners.

==== HIV ====
Afghanistan is one of the countries with a low number of confirmed HIV-cases. In May of 2004, an Afghan man and his two small children died of AIDS in Kabul. They were registered in the country as the first AIDS victims. 504 HIV-positive cases were documented in late 2008. By 2019, the number had steadily climbed to 2,923. Most were intravenous drug users, and 70% of them were men, 25% women, and the remaining 5% children. They belonged to Kabul, Kandahar and Herat, the provinces from where people make the most trips to other countries. Regarding Kandahar, 22 cases were reported in 2012. The government said 1,320 blood samples were examined and 21 were HIV-positive. Among the 21 patients, 18 were males and three were females who contracted the deadly virus from their husbands. Four people had reached a critical stage while three had died. The main source of the disease was the use of syringes by drug addicts. A UNDP representative recently said that more than 12,000 Afghans may be living with HIV. The government reported 300 new HIV-positive cases in 2025. The Afghan-Japan Hospital in Kabul recorded 200 cases in 2026.

Time	People with HIV
1989	1
1990	600
1995	1,300
2000	1,900
2005	2,000
2019	2,923

==== Influenza ====
WHO recently recorded 64,658 cases of influenza and acute respiratory infection (ARI) in Afghanistan, for which the country does have vaccines to fight them. COVID-19 has killed over 8,000 Afghans since early 2020.

==== Leishmaniasis ====
Leishmaniasis is estimated to cause the ninth largest disease burden among infectious diseases worldwide. It is not preventable by vaccination or chemoprophylaxis, but only by personal protective measures preventing bites of infectious arthropod vectors. The disease still exists in Afghanistan. Four Leishmania species have been considered endemic in northern Afghanistan, of which Leishmania tropica, L. major, and L. donovani can produce skin lesions while L. donovani and L. infantum visceralize. Visceral leishmaniasis (VL) infections are often recognized by fever, swelling of the liver and spleen, and anemia. They are known by many local names, of which the most common is probably Kala azar. A total of 21 cases of VL acquired in Afghanistan, all in the 1980s according to CDC reporting.

==== Leprosy ====
Despite anti-leprosy initiatives by Leprosy Control (LEPCO) dating to 1984, leprosy is present in Afghanistan, with 231 cases reported in the 2001-2007 period. Just over three-quarters of the cases were the MB-type, with the rest PB-type. Leprosy has been reported mainly in the provinces of Bamyan, Ghazni and Balkh. One of the doctors who have been treating leprosy patients was Tetsu Nakamura.

==== Malaria ====
Although malaria is another public health problem in Afghanistan, the number of confirmed cases of people infected with malaria have been decreasing in the last decade. WHO has reported 5,591 cases of malaria in 2025. Ten people have died from it in 2017 and two in 2024.

==== Tuberculosis ====
Around 50,000 Afghans are tested positive for tuberculosis (TB) each year. Of these, up to 13,000 die from the disease and the remaining are cured. The number was slightly higher in the past. Over 65% of patients with TB have been adult females and children under the age of 15.

==== Typhoid fever ====
Afghanistan is still rebuilding and at the same time housing millions of new arrivals from neighboring Iran and Pakistan. About 32% of its population does not have access to improved sanitation. Because of this many are forced to combat typhoid fever. Typhoid fever is one of the country's major infectious diseases in terms of food/waterborne diseases. This infectious disease occurs when fecal material comes into contact with food or water. Symptoms vary from case to case but often mild fever is present and if left untreated death may occur.

==== Measles ====
WHO recently recorded 18,826 suspected cases of measles in Afghanistan. The number was twice higher in 2025. There were around 75,000 positive cases in 2022, when the disease had killed over 380 children in the country. This had prompted a nationwide vaccination campaign.

==== Mpox ====
Mpox (monkeypox) has not been reported in any part of Afghanistan. The government plans to keep it that way. This disease is found mostly in several African countries. Two suspected mpox cases were reported in Nimruz Province in 2022, which later turned out negative.

==== Pneumonia ====
In Afghanistan, the child mortality rate is estimated at 55 deaths per 1,000 live births. About 20% of deaths are from pneumonia. Although Afghanistan is considered 1 of the 5 countries with the highest level of childhood deaths from pneumonia, studies of the risk factors for death and etiology of pneumonia among children in Afghanistan are lacking. The CFR for children less than 5 years of age with pneumonia admitted to a regional hospital in Afghanistan was 12.1%, compared with only 7.6% for the full WHO Eastern Mediterranean region. Most deaths occurred within 2 days of hospitalization. Factors that may have contributed to the high mortality rate were delays in presentation to healthcare facilities, inability to identify severe symptoms in children, and delayed referral from primary care. These issues could be addressed by strengthening the Integrated Management of Childhood Illness program of WHO, introduced in Afghanistan in 2004.

==== Polio ====
In 2026, a total of 42 suspected cases of polio have been reported. Only 4 cases were reported in 2025. A total of 6 cases were recorded in 2023, all in Nangarhar Province. Only two cases were recorded in the year prior to that. Pakistan and Afghanistan are the only two countries in the world where the transmission of endemic wild poliovirus type 1 (WPV1) continues.

==== Rabies ====
In 2023 at least 18 people died from rabies in Afghanistan. Most dog bites occurred in the province of Kabul (5,2007) followed by in the provinces of Herat (1,453), Nangarhar (960), Helmand (857), Ghazni (767), Faryab (762), Kunar (730) and Paktia (710).

==== Thalassemia ====
In 2025 more than 5,000 people suffering from thalassemia, which is a serious blood disorder disease, were registered in Afghanistan. The number of sufferers was 12,103 in 2023. A year prior to that the disease had killed 11 children in Balkh Province. Recently a new thalassemia treatment center was opened in Herat Province.

==== Ventricular septal defect ====
According to the Afghan Red Crescent Society, as much as 15,000 children are currently affected by the treatable disease known as ventricular septal defect, which is commonly referred to as hole in the heart. Most patients are treated inside Afghanistan, while a small number of them go abroad for treatment.

=== Non communicable diseases ===
==== Cancer ====
Around 16,000 patients die annually from various types of cancer. The most common cancers in Afghanistan are breast cancer, esophageal cancer and stomach cancer. To combat these deadly diseases, a number of major cancer treatment hospitals are being built in the country.

==== Diabetes ====
Like in other countries, cases of diabetes are on the rise in Afghanistan. The disease kills over 1,000 citizens annually. Around 90% of the diabetes patients have type 2 diabetes.

==== Ventricular septal defect ====
According to the Afghan Red Crescent Society, as much as 15,000 children are currently affected by the treatable disease known as ventricular septal defect, which is commonly referred to as hole in the heart. Most patients are treated inside Afghanistan, while a small number of them go abroad for treatment.

=== Injuries and risk factors ===
==== Malnutrition ====
Child malnutrition continues to be one of Afghanistan's main health concerns. Over 3 million children experience permanent mental and physical damage because they are poorly nourished in the crucial first two years of life. Each year over 30,000 of them die from malnutrition.

== See also ==
- Environmental issues in Afghanistan
- Ministry of Public Health (Afghanistan)
