= Cannabis in Afghanistan =

- Location of Afghanistan (dark green)
- Medicinal: Illegal
- Recreational: Illegal

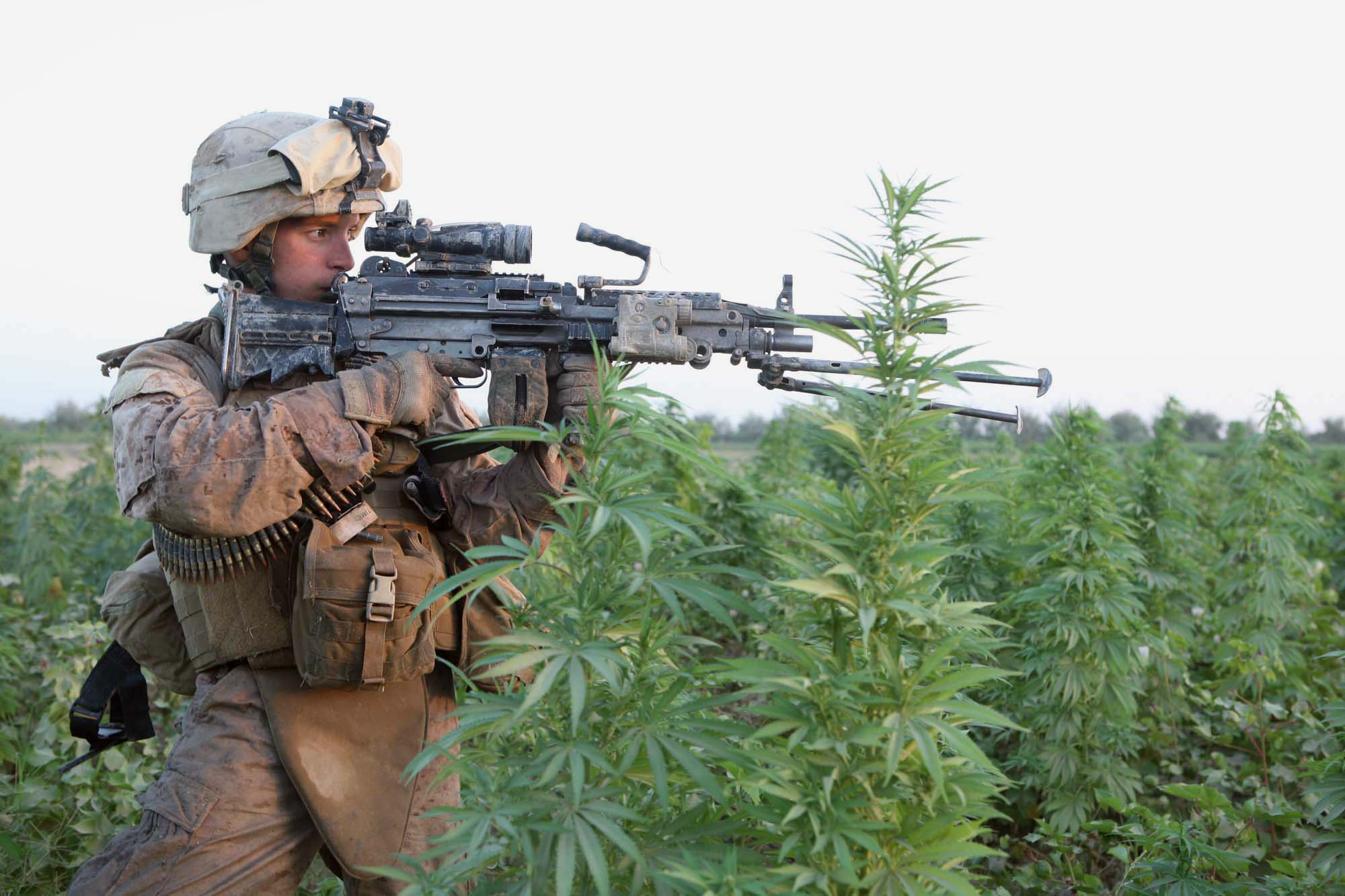
US Marine in a cannabis field in Helmand province, 2010

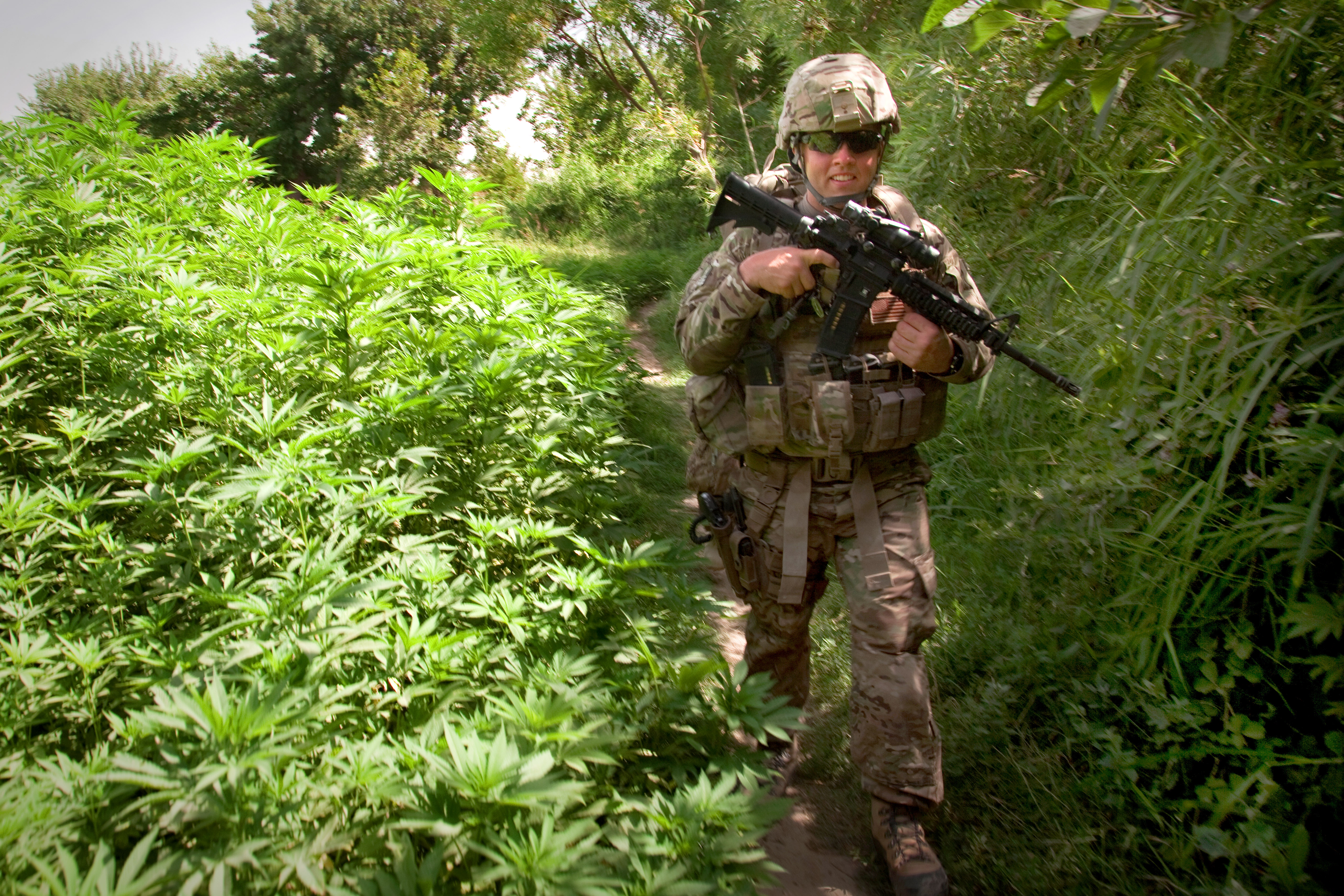
An American soldier patrols past cannabis plants in Kandahar, 2011

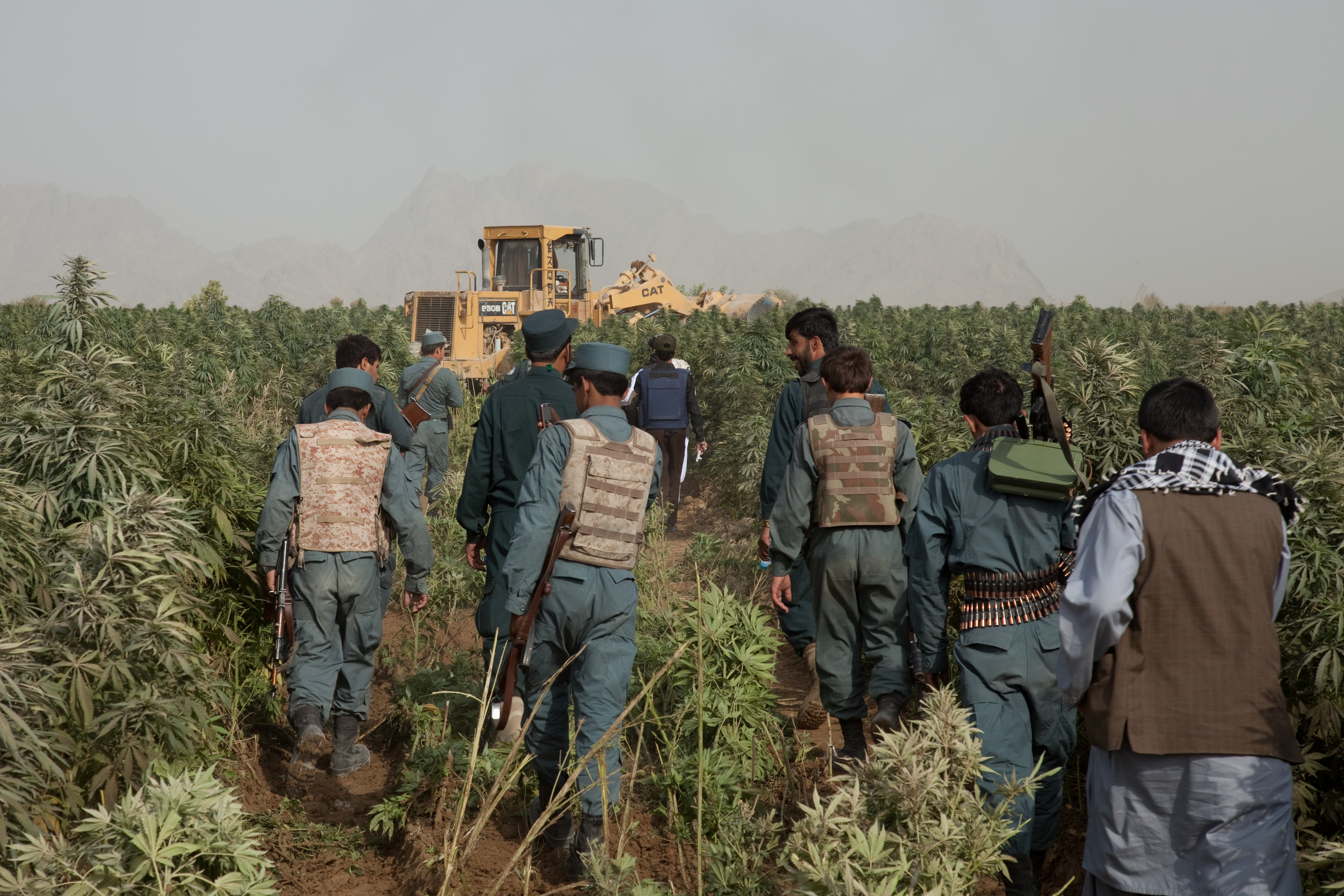
Afghan Police eradicating cannabis in Kandahar in 2011

Cannabis is illegal in Afghanistan. It has been cultivated for centuries, and experienced relatively little interference until the 1970s, where after it became an issue both in international politics and in the finance of the series of wars which occurred in Afghanistan for forty years. In 2010, the United Nations reported that Afghanistan was the world's top cannabis producer.

== History ==
Cannabis indica is native to Afghanistan. With Cannabis sativa also originating in Central Asia, it is likely that all existing cannabis strains originated from Afghanistan.

=== Early cultivation ===
Baba Ku is a legendary folkloric character from Balkh in Afghanistan, a Sufi adherent who legendarily introduced hashish to Afghanistan.

=== Hippie Trail ===
While traditional cultivation and largely local consumption of cannabis was common in Afghanistan, the development of the Hippie Trail in the 1970s brought an influx of young tourists with an appetite for cannabis to Afghanistan. Hashish had been made nominally illegal in 1957, allegedly mostly as a concession to US pressure, but persisted as a common drug in the country. However, increased production and sale to Western tourists raised the issue to the level of a social problem for the Afghan government. In 1972 Afghan authorities confiscated large amounts of refined heroin and hashish intended for export, revealing the increasingly international scope of drug production in the country. US pressure on Kabul hashish syndicates in 1971 further increased the tension around the issue.

During the 1970s, several Afghan citizens were also linked to the Brotherhood of Eternal Love commune in the United States. Kabul merchant Hyatullah Tohki transported hashish with his brother Amanullah, who worked at the American embassy in Kabul.

=== Royal prohibition ===
In 1973, King Zahir Shah outlawed opium poppy and cannabis production, this time followed by genuine commitment to eradication, backed by $47 million in funding from the United States government. That summer Afghan troops aggressively tackled production, destroying farms and arresting or killing cannabis farmers. Zahir Shah was deposed by his cousin Mohammed Daoud Khan that fall, who ended the monarchy and established himself as President, but the momentum of the hashish trade had been interrupted, and Western smugglers re-routed to Pakistani sources, so the 1973 harvest was minimal, as were harvests for several years following.

=== Second Taliban era ===
Cannabis production in Afghanistan fell sharply after the second Taliban takeover in 2021, but illicit farming has continued to stubbornly resist efforts to crack down on production, and production remained highly volatile in subsequent years: hashish production was estimated at 1,500 tons in October 2026, having partially recovered from re-prohibition in 2021, but still well below earlier levels during the coalition occupation.

== Cannabis culture ==
One consumption custom in Afghanistan is eating melon along with hashish, which is said to increase the high and decrease any negative side effects.

== See also ==
- Illegal drug trade
- Opium production in Afghanistan
