= Taxation in Afghanistan =

Taxation in Afghanistan includes corporate taxes and income taxes.

== Corporate taxes ==
All companies, no matter what kind of legal form the company is, are required to pay a corporate tax at the rate of 20 percent. It can be found in the 4th article of the Afghan Income Tax law.

=== Value-added tax (VAT) ===
In 2014, the parliament of Afghanistan worked closely with the International Monetary Fund to raise the domestic revenues and therefore added a value-added tax (VAT) of 10 percent. Although, the existing law does not include all goods and services (hotels are affected for example), the government is planning to broaden this tax. VAT affects both domestic business people and their trade partners. The domestic taxpayer is obliged to pay the VAT on the taxable supply and the importer is obliged to pay the VAT on the taxable imports.

=== Business receipt tax (BRT) ===
Afghanistan has many different tax rates of business receipt tax on their goods and services. The size of the business receipt tax depends on which kind of company and how large the company is. Lowest BRT has travel agents, culture, smaller restaurants and commodities with a tax rate of 4 percent. The larger restaurants, hotels and club halls have to pay 5 percent in business receipt tax. That tax rate was increased during 2015, from 2 percent to 4 percent, when the government wanted to increase the state revenues to finance the increased need for aid and foreign arms.

== Income taxes ==
Individuals are subject to tax at progressive rates, calculated monthly.

Income slab per month (AFN)	Applicable Rate
0 - 5,000	0%
5001-12,500	2%
12,501-100,000	10% + AFN 150
100,001 and above	20% + AFN 8,900

== Tax administration ==
Tax assessment is handled by the Taxpayers Services Directorate, while taxes are paid directly to Da Afghanistan Bank.

== The development of the fiscal situation in Afghanistan during 21st century ==
Since the beginning of the 21st century, governmental revenues have aggregately increased. One of the reasons for this improvement is a more efficient tax system. However, revenues have been less than what they planned for due to situations such as tax evasion and the large drug market, tightening constraints on the budget. In 2015, the government made some improvements of both the tax administration and the customs and that made the revenues increase during 2015.

== Customs and fees ==
=== Revenue collection under the Islamic Republic ===
In the early 21st century, Afghanistan sought to increase domestic revenue through reforms to tax administration and customs collection, with government revenue increasing in the 2010s, despite tax evasion, limited administrative capacity, and the collection constraints of a large and informal economy. Reforms introduced in 2015 were reported as contributing to improvements in tax and customs revenue.

The national budget for 2018 provided for approximately AFN 327 billion in expenditure, compared with AFN 429 billion in the preceding year. Expected domestic revenue was approximately AFN 157 billion. Security accounted for the largest share of budgeted expenditure, followed by education, infrastructure, and agriculture and rural development.

=== Revenue collection under the renewed Taliban administration ===
Following the Taliban takeover in August 2021, Afghanistan experienced a severe economic contraction and a reduction in international financial assistance. The loss of external grants increased the importance of domestic revenue collection, including taxation and customs duties. In 2024, the United Nations reported that the Taliban authorities had improved the collection of taxes and customs revenue, and the World Bank subsequently reported continued increases in domestic revenue during 2025, supported by stronger enforcement and compliance measures.
