= Leprosy Control =

Leprosy Control (LepCo or LEPCO) is a non-governmental organization addressing leprosy. The organization has been active in countries such as Afghanistan.
