= Fauna of Afghanistan =

Native animals of Afghanistan

Fauna of Afghanistan is gradually increasing due to the Qosh Tepa Canal and the establishment of national parks and dams. In Afghanistan, there are more than 3,000 plant species, including many assortments of trees, bushes, vines, blossoms, and growths. Especially numerous are therapeutic plants such as wormwood, and asafoetida; products of the soil trees are found in numerous territories. Fauna found in the region includes the fox, lynx, wild hound, bear, mongoose, vixen, hedgehog, hyena, jerboa, rabbit, and wild assortments of felines, asses, mountain goats, and mountain sheep. Trout is the most common fish. There are over 100 species of wildfowl and other birds.

== Wildlife ==
The Caspian tiger used to be sighted along the upper compasses of Hari River close to Herat to the wildernesses in the lower spans of the stream until the mid 1970s. In March 2017, fringe monitors captured and appropriated six white lions in Kandahar Province. It was eventually confirmed that they were from Africa. Four of the lions were later taken to Kabul Zoo while the other two are still in Kandahar.

Vegetation in Afghanistan is scanty yet diverse. Latest reports state that about 2.8% of the country is believed to be forested, which amounts to nearly 2,000,000 ha (4,900,000 acres) of the land. Regular trees in the country are pines, evergreens, mulberries, maples, oaks, poplars, almonds, walnuts, wild hazelnuts, and pistachios. In parts of the east and southwest date palms, citrus and weeping trees can be spotted. The fields of the north are to a great extent dry, treeless steppes, and those of the southwestern corner are about appalling deserts. Regular plants in the dry districts incorporate camel thistle, locoweed, prickly restharrow, mimosa, and wormwood, an assortment of sagebrush. The wild creatures of Afghanistan include over 100 warm blooded animal species, some of which are approaching extinction. The most grievously endangered are the goitered gazelle, panther, snow leopard, markhor, and bactrian deer. Other wild creatures of Afghanistan include Marco Polo sheep, urials, ibex, bears, wolves, foxes, hyenas, jackals, and mongooses. Wild pig, hedgehogs, wenches, rabbits, mouse rabbits, bats, and different rodents additionally happen. In excess of 380 flying creature species are found in Afghanistan, with in excess of 200 reproducing there. Flamingo and other oceanic fowl breed in the lake regions south and east of Ghazni. Hunting wildlife has been banned in all provinces of Afghanistan.

== See also ==
- Geography of Afghanistan
