= List of World Heritage Sites in Afghanistan =

Location of World Heritage Sites in Afghanistan.

The United Nations Educational, Scientific and Cultural Organization (UNESCO) World Heritage Sites are places of importance to cultural or natural heritage as described in the UNESCO World Heritage Convention, established in 1972. Cultural heritage consists of monuments (such as architectural works, monumental sculptures, or inscriptions), groups of buildings, and sites (including archaeological sites). Natural heritage consists of natural features (physical and biological formations), geological and physiographical formations (including habitats of threatened species of animals and plants), and natural sites which are important from the point of view of science, conservation, or natural beauty. Afghanistan accepted the convention on March 20, 1979, making its sites eligible for inclusion on the list.

As of 2022, there are two World Heritage Sites in Afghanistan, and a further four on the tentative list. The first site listed was the Minaret and Archaeological Remains of Jam, in 2002. The second site was the Cultural Landscape and Archaeological Remains of the Bamiyan Valley, in 2003. Both sites are cultural, and were placed to the List of World Heritage in Danger immediately upon inscription.

== World Heritage Sites ==
UNESCO lists sites under ten criteria; each entry must meet at least one of the criteria. Criteria i through vi are cultural, and vii through x are natural.

† In danger

World Heritage Sites
Site	Image	Location (province)	Year listed	UNESCO data	Description
Minaret and Archaeological Remains of Jam^{†}		Ghor	2002	211rev; ii, iii, iv (cultural)	The minaret was completed in 1194 under the Sultan Ghiyath al-Din Muhammad of the Ghurid dynasty. It is located in a remote area in a deep river valley. Likely, it is the only building that remains of the Ghurid summer capital of Firozkoh. It is 65 m (213 ft) tall and consists of four superimposed cylinders. It is covered by geometric designs and a Kufic inscription in turquoise tiles. The architecture of the minaret was influential in the region, including in the inspiration for the Qutb Minar in Delhi, India. Remains of Ghurid settlements from the 12th and 13th centuries have been found in the area. The site has been listed as endangered immediately upon inscription in 2002.
Cultural Landscape and Archaeological Remains of the Bamiyan Valley^{†}		Bamyan	2003	208rev; i, ii, iii, iv, vi (cultural)	Located on one of the branches of the Silk Road, the Bamiyan Valley was a flourishing Buddhist centre between the 1st and 13th centuries and an important pilgrimage site. There are several Buddhist monuments in the area, including statues and carved caves. The exchange of Indian, Hellenistic, Roman, and Sasanian influences resulted in a particular artistic expression, the Gandhara art. Later, during the Islamic period, several fortifications were built, and the Buddhist culture declined. Two colossal standing Buddha statues (the larger one pictured) were destroyed by the Taliban in 2001, an act that resulted in international condemnation. The site has been listed as endangered immediately upon inscription in 2003.

== Tentative list ==
In addition to sites inscribed on the World Heritage List, member states can maintain a list of tentative sites that they may consider for nomination. Nominations for the World Heritage List are only accepted if the site was previously listed on the tentative list. As of 2022, Afghanistan lists four properties on its tentative list.

Tentative sites
Site	Image	Location (province)	Year listed	UNESCO criteria	Description
City of Herat	A decorated mosque with a park in front	Herat	2004	i, ii, iii, iv (cultural)	The city of Herat, the capital of western Afghanistan, was founded around 500 BCE and has been an important cultural and commercial centre. It flourished under the Ghurid dynasty in the 12th and 13th centuries, got destroyed by the Mongols, and saw a revival under the Timurid Empire in the 14th and 15th centuries. Several monuments from these periods remain, including the Musalla complex with the Gawhar Shad Mausoleum, the Great Mosque (pictured), and the Shrine of Khwaja Abd Allah.
City of Balkh (antique Bactria)	A decorated mosque, parts are damaged	Balkh	2004	ii, iv, v (cultural)	Balkh was an important and wealthy city of the ancient region of Bactria. It was a cultural and religious centre of Zoroastrianism and Buddhism, with several monasteries and stupas reported in the 7th century. In the 10th century, it was a centre of learning, with a citadel surrounded by earthen walls. It was destroyed by Genghis Khan in 1220 and again in the 14th century by Timur. Today, some buildings from the Timurid period remain (the Green Mosque pictured), as well as ruins from the previous periods.
Band-E-Amir	A mountain lake	Bamyan	2004	vii, viii, ix, x (natural)	Band-E-Amir is a series of mountain lakes created by natural dams. The waters are pure blue and the nature is undisturbed. The area is protected as a national park and is popular with tourists.
Bagh-e Babur	A Persianate garden with trees, water channel, and a mountain in the background	Kabul	2009	iv (cultural)	The Gardens of Babur, located on the slopes above Kabul, are an early example of a Mughal garden. The gardens were constructed in the early 16th century under the first Mughal Emperor Babur, who is also buried here. After the decline of the Mughals, the gardens were decaying until the late 19th century. After 1880, they were renovated under Emir Abdur Rahman Khan. Another redesign took place in the early 20th century under King Nadir Shah, the gardens were then transformed to a public park following European designs.
