= Peshawari people =

Residents of Peshawar

Pishori girls from Peshawar

Peshawaris, also known as Peshoris (Hindko: پشوری) and Kharay (Pashto: خارے, romanized: Xāryān, lit. 'city dwellers'), are the indigenous urban Hindko-speaking community originating from and native to the city of Peshawar, in the Khyber Pakhtunkhwa province of Pakistan. The dialect of Hindko spoken in the Peshawari households is known as the Peshori Hindko, or simply Peshori, which also serves as the standardized literary dialect of the Hindko language.

Sample of conversational Peshawari Hindko (Peshori) spoken by Peshawaris in Oxford, UK.

Peshoris have inhabited Peshawar for thousands of years, and formed a majority in the city until the 1960s. Today, they are a minority ethnic group mostly confined to the historic Walled City (Androon Shehr), owing to the rural-to-urban migration of rural Pashtuns into the city, linguistic shift to Pashto and Urdu as well as the influx of Afghan refugees following the Soviet-Afghan War, among other factors. They constitute 5.5% of the urban population of Peshawar, or around 105,000 people (this number only reflects the fraction of total city population that speaks Hindko as first language, thus neglecting a significant fragment of Peshoris, especially youth members - which has shifted to Urdu as the primary tongue, leading to an overall underestimation), according to the 2023 Census of Pakistan.

== Culture ==
Similar to the widely recognised Pashtunwali tradition or tribal code of honor of Pashtuns, the Peshoris adhere to an urban cultural code known as Peshoritop (Hindko: پشوری پن), which encapsulates their distinct identity and social practices. This code, rooted in the traditions of Peshawar, emphasizes four key principles:

- Storytelling
- Hospitality
- Self-esteem
- Hyper-social Community Structure

== Notable people ==
- Putras Bukhari
- Dilip Kumar
- Ranbir Kapoor
- Ismail Gulgee
- Farigh Bukhari
- Shah Rukh Khan
- Anil Kapoor
- Dr. Sayed Amjad Hussain
- Dr. Muhammad Rehman
- Abdul Basit (diplomat)
- Syed Shafaat Ali
- Abdur Rauf Seemab
- Z. A. Bukhari
- Ahmad Ali Saayein
- Haji Muhammad Adeel
- Ghulam Ahmad Bilour
- Iqbal Zafar Jhagra
- Qazi Anwar
- Malik Tariq Awan
- Syed Qasim Ali Shah
- Raj Kapoor
- Khatir Ghaznavi
- F. C. Kohli
- Maulana Abdur Rahim Popalzai
- Anil K. Chopra
- Abdur Rehman Peshawari
- General Yahya Khan
- Rubina Khalid
- Afzal Bangash
- Mulk Raj Anand
- Firdous Jamal
- Rasheed Naz
- Zia Sarhadi
- Najeebullah Anjum
- Iftikhar Qaisar
- Vinod Khanna
- Khalida Rashid Khan
- Mahjabin Qazalbash
- Kundan Lal Jaggi
- Kundan Lal Gujral
- Bushra Farrukh
- Umar Daraz Khallil
- Mehr Chand Khanna
- Rajni Kaul
- Hari Kishan Talwar
