= Ala =

Ala, ALA, Alaa, or Alae may refer to:

== Codes ==
- Åland Islands, ISO 3166-1 alpha-3 code
- Åland, ISO 3166-1 country code
- Former NYSE stock symbol of Alcatel; see Alcatel-Lucent
- Almaty International Airport, IATA code

== Military ==
- USS Ala (YT-139), a US Navy tugboat
- Ala (Roman allied military unit), a Republican-period, largely infantry, formation of 5,400 men
- Ala (Roman cavalry unit), an Imperial-period, purely cavalry, formation of 500 men
- American Legion Auxiliary
- Arab Liberation Army
- Arakan Liberation Army

== Mythology and religion ==
- Ala (demon), a female demon in Serbian mythology
- Ala (Luwian goddess), a Hittite and Luwian goddess
- Ala (Odinani), an Alusi (deity) in the Odinani beliefs of the Igbo people of Nigeria

== Organizations ==
- African Leadership Academy
- Alleanza Liberalpopolare – Autonomie, an Italian political party
- Allgemeine Anzeigen GmbH
- American Latvian Association
- American Leadership Academy
- American Legion Auxiliary
- American Library Association
- American Literature Association
- American Lung Association
- Arizona Lutheran Academy
- Associate of the Library Association
- Association for Laboratory Automation
- Australian Lacrosse Association
- Australian Liberty Alliance, a political party

== People ==
- Ala (name), includes a list of people with given name or surname Ala or Alaa

== Places ==
- Ala, Hiiu County, Estonia, a village
- Ala, Valga County, Estonia, a village
- Ala, Alappuzha, Kerala, India, a village
- Ala, Iran, a village in Semnan Province
- Ala, Gotland, Sweden
- Alad, Seydun or Ala, a village in Khuzestan Province, Iran
- Ala, Trentino, Italy, a comune
- Alà dei Sardi, Italy, a comune
- Alabama, a state in the United States
- Alae (Cilicia), a town of ancient Cilicia

== Science ==
- Acetylated lanolin alcohol
- Ala of nose, in human anatomy
- Alae (nematode anatomy)
- Ala (or A), abbreviation for alanine, an α-amino acid
- Alpha lipoic acid, a nutritional supplement
- Alpha-linolenic acid, an omega−3 fatty acid
- δ-aminolevulinic acid or δ-ALA

== Other uses ==
- Ala (restaurant), a restaurant in Washington, D.C.
- Acta Linguistica Asiatica, linguistics journal
- 'Alá', the last month of the Bahá'í calendar
- ALA-LC, a set of romanization standards
  - Former airline Aerotransportes Litoral Argentino, merged into Austral Líneas Aéreas
- Ala Mai, 2023 heavy metal album by Polynesian band Shepherds Reign
- Atlas of Living Australia, an online database of Australian plants and animals
- Austral Líneas Aéreas, an Argentine domestic airline

== See also ==
- à la, French for 'in the style/manner of' commonly used in English
- Al-Ala, the 87th chapter of the Qur'an
- Ala Industrial Zone, Iran, a village
- Ala dağları, a mountain range in the Taurus chain, Turkey
- Ala railway station, Pakistan
- Allah, Arabic name for God
- Alaâ, Tunisia, a town in Kairouan Governorate, Tunisia
