= Khawajgan =

Pashtun community in northern Pakistan

Coordinates: 34°25′40″N 73°08′27″E

Khawajgan (خواجڴان;) is a Pashtun community in northern Pakistan. It is located in Mansehra District, Khyber Pakhtunkhwa Province, about 45 kilometers east of the Indus River and 156 kilometers from Islamabad, in the lower Pakhal Valley. It is the de facto headquarters of the Swati tribe and the second most populous village in the Pakhal Valley with prevailing Nambardari system; currently headed by Nambardar Abdul Ghafoor Khan and Abdul Zahoor Khan (Ex Nazim) s/o Muhammad Maroof Khan (Late Nambardar).

Javed Khan s/o Allahdad khan is a Pakistani local political figure and community leader from Khawajgan village, located in Mansehra District, Khyber Pakhtunkhwa, Pakistan. He has served as a Nazim (chairman) at the village level, where he has been involved in local governance, community affairs, and village development initiatives.

During his involvement in local leadership, Khan has been associated with various development projects and community initiatives aimed at improving facilities and supporting the residents of Khawajgan. He is also known locally for his participation in political and social activities.

Khawajgan is bordered on the east by the village of Sherpur; on the west by Janglat, the Meadows of Ajmer, and Chorgali; on the north by Muradpur (Najjha), the Jageer area, Tatar, and Gidarpur; and on the south by the city of Mansehra.

The main language is Pushto, with pockets of Hindko. Small minorities speak Urdu and English.

== History ==
Khawajgan was built as a small Pashtun village approximately 500 years ago. The area may once have been inhabited by Hindus and Turks, before the Swati tribe invaded. The date of the invasion is not known.

The people of Khawajgan are members of the Swati tribe, from the Sarkhailee, Mamyati, and Matrawi clans. The tribe first settled in Tajikistan. From there, they migrated to Afghanistan, then to the Swat Valley, and then to the Pakhal Valley. The Swatis who invaded were descendants of Batu Khail Balghandar Khan, a descendant of Ali Sher Khan, son of Sultan Mitra Khan-Matrawi. Later, Inayat Ullah Khan rebuilt Khawajgan at its current location, at a high altitude with an abundance of water from a nearby stream for drinking and farming.

Khawajgan is a federation of a number of small villages, including Landai, Bhatain, Shanai, Skandara, Dagai, Golroo Maira, Baila, and Bandi Sheikhan.

== Education ==
In the beginning of 19th century, the two educated and notable person were Tehsildaar Sheikh Khalil ur Rahman and Head master Khadi Khan who was also the nambardar of Khawajgan. Since independence, Khawajgan has seen a significant improvement in education and educational facilities, although the standards are fairly low in government-funded schools compared with those in the rest of the country. The literacy rate among residents 10 or older is just under 50 percent; it has increased by 34 percent since 1981. The male literacy rate is higher, at 60.5 percent.

There are separate educational institutes for girls and boys, as well as co-educational institutes. However, most families with children move to Mansehra or Abbottabad for schooling. Some of the educational institutes in Khawajgan are:

- Government Primary School for Boys
- Government Middle School for Girls
- Muslim Public High School
- National Model Public School

== Economy ==
Khawajgan is largely an agricultural area. The major crops are wheat, sugarcane, tobacco, maize, rice, rapeseed, mustard, and various vegetables, including both kharif and rabi crops. Important fruits are oranges, plums, peaches, apricots, pears, figs, walnuts, berries, persimmon (amlok) and apples. The past 10 years have seen major improvements in education, health, and infrastructure. Large-scale poultry farming and manufacturing based on agricultural material have grown, as has the financial sector. National bank have opened its branch in village center, and the population is growing rapidly.

== Climate ==
The summer season in Khawajgan is hot. Temperatures rise steeply from May to June, reaching a peak of 41.5 °C on average, and remain high through July, August, and September. During May and June, dust storms are frequent. Starting in October, temperatures fall rapidly. The coldest months are December, January and February, with a mean minimum temperature of 2.1 °C.

Most rainfall occurs in July, August, December and January. The maximum rainfall is 125.85 mm in August. Toward the end of the cold-weather season, there are occasional thunderstorms and hail storms. The relative humidity is high throughout the year, reaching a maximum of 73.33% in December.

== Flora and fauna ==
Common trees in Khawajgan are mesquite, ber, acacia, eucalyptus, safeda, pine, and cedar. The village has a variety of fauna, including the jackal, goat, and pheasant. Russian doves migrate through the area and are a target of hunters, as locals like their meat.

== Food ==
People of Khawajgan are traditionally meat eaters, similar to other Pashtun tribes. Popular foods in the village include beef cooked as chapli Kabab by (Late) Abdur Rahman mama and Nazeer mama and sticky white rice, known as Garla Rijay. Other delicacies include seekh kabab, tikka, and kehwa (green tea), rice of Gula, Kakay and Sarfaraz .

== Dwellings ==
The village is divided into kandis based on the pattern of agricultural lands. The houses generally consist of many rooms, lounge, lawn, a courtyard and a Veranda.

Each kandi has its own mosque and a meeting place called a hujra, commonly used for business and to settle public disputes. In most cases, hujras are the property of the kandi's elders, who are expected to feed and give shelter to visitors. The best-known hujra in Khawajgan, which is open to travelers 365 days a year, is Abdul Ghafoor Khan Sahab (Nambardar) and Abdul Zahoor Khan Sahab's (Ex Nazim) s/o Muhammad Maroof Khan Sahab (Late Nambardar) Hujra.

Khawajgan has big bungalows and mansions as there are elite people living in the area.
