= Qizilbash (name) =

Qizilbash, Kizilbash or Qazalbash (قزلباش) is a Turkic-language family name derived from the name of various Qizilbash groups. The word itself means "Red Head" in Turkic languages. Notable people with the name include:

- Agha Ali Abbas Qizilbash
- Agha Muhammad Yahya Khan Qizilbash
- Amir Qazalbash
- Asad Qizilbash
- Muzaffar Ali Khan Qizilbash
- Shahtaj Qizilbash
- Mahjabin Qizilbash
