= Jarral Shareef =

Jarral جرل
- Union council
- Jarral
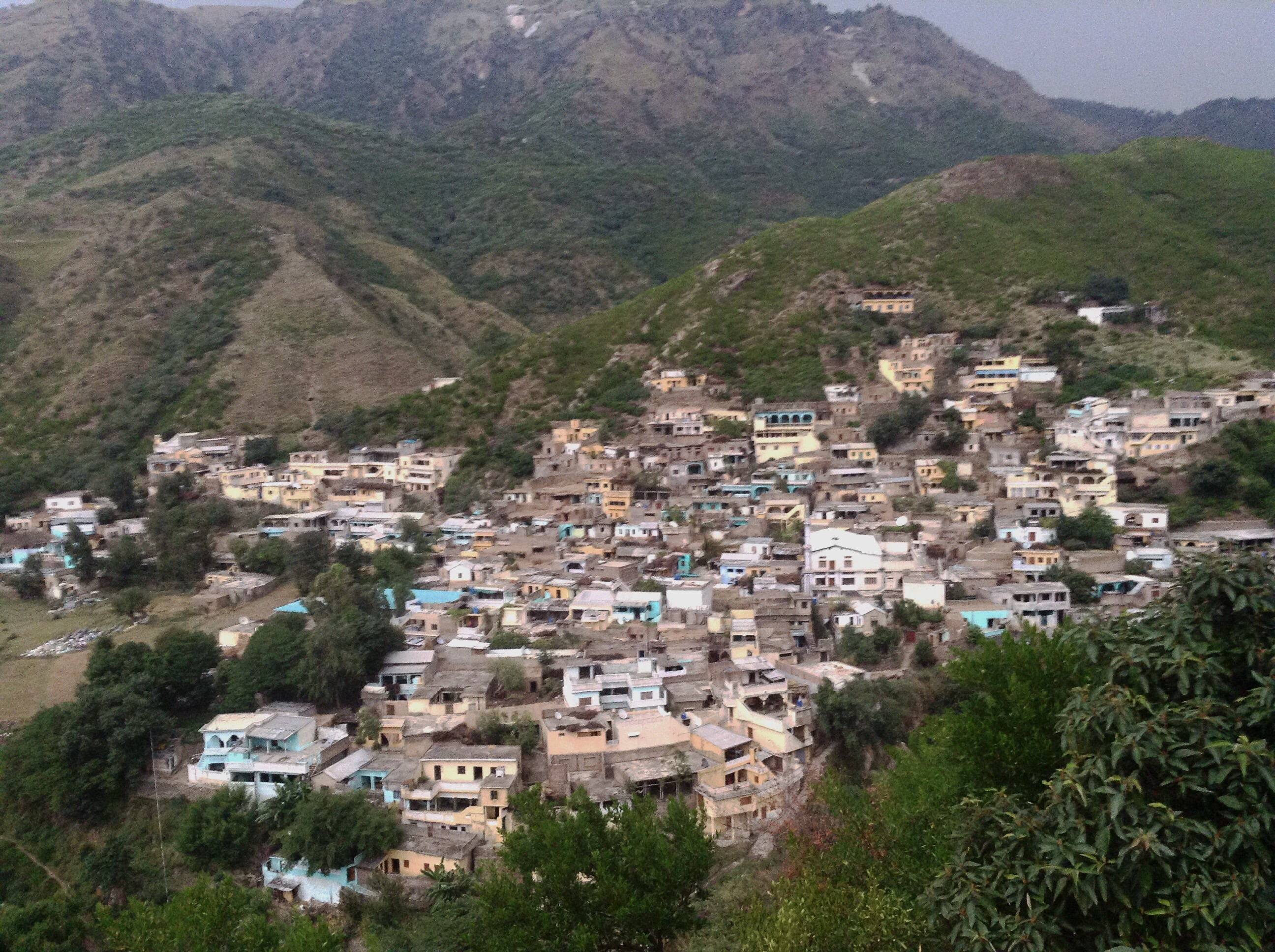

- Location within Khyber Pakhtunkhwa Location within Pakistan
- Country: Pakistan
- Province: Khyber Pakhtunkhwa
- District: Abbottabad
- Tehsil: Abbottabad

Government
  - Nazim: Gul Riaz Akhtar Khan
  - Naib Nazim: Malik Zafar Ali

Population (2017)
  - Total: 7,952
- Time zone: PKT (UTC+05:00)
- ZIP code: 22760
- Union council code: 40600

Jarral Shareef (Hindko: جرناں) is one of the union councils of Abbottabad District in the Khyber Pakhtunkhwa province of Pakistan. Jarral has a population of almost 8,000.

== Location ==
Jarral Shareef's chief settlement, the village of Jarral, is located 37 km from the city of Abbottabad and is located in a valley surrounded by large mountains on three sides. On the south of the valley lies the Tarbela Dam lake. The southern areas of Jarral UC borders Haripur District.

The Union Council of Jarral is the central point of the Tanawal area, which is linked to two districts of Khyber Pakhtunkhwa—i.e., Haripur from the west and Abbottabad to the east. Jarral is a populated village of the area. The main caste of this village is Tanoli, and most of the population belongs to the Tanoli tribe .

== Subdivisions ==
The Union Council of Jarral Shareef is subdivided into the following areas:

- Bacha Sani
- Bhajwal
- Gul Bandi
- Jabbi
- Jarral
- Khutiala
- Kot Nali
- Nakhey

== Gallery ==
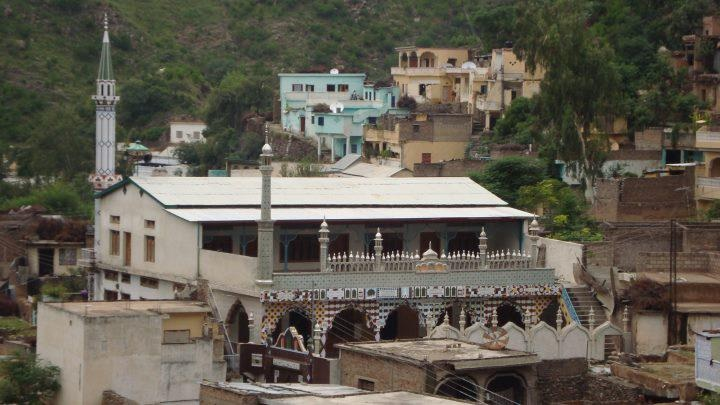
Jamia Masjid

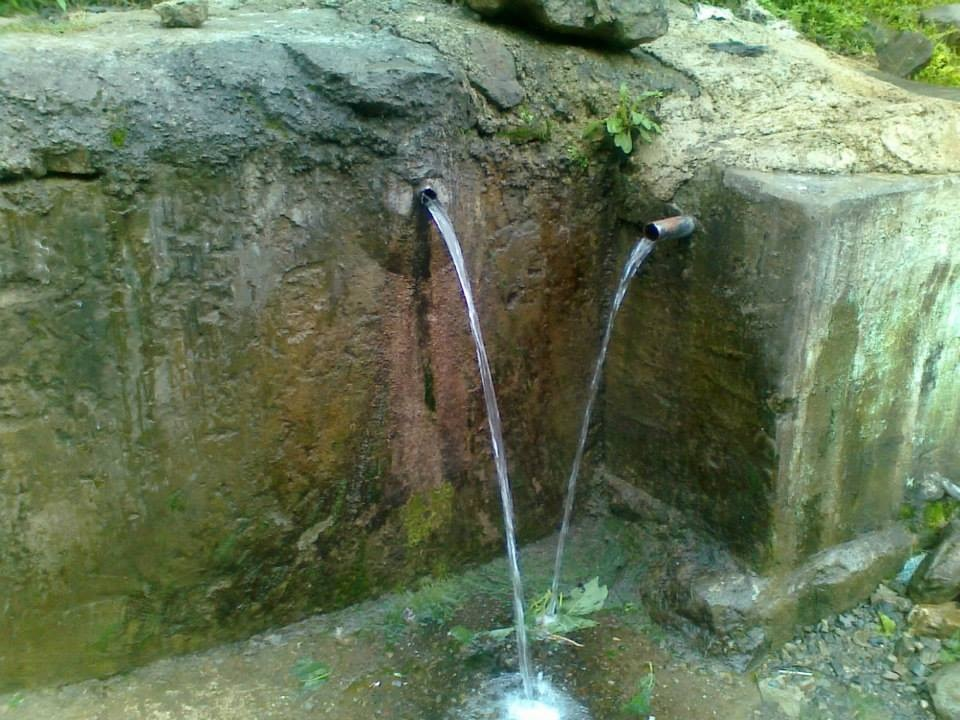
Nalota

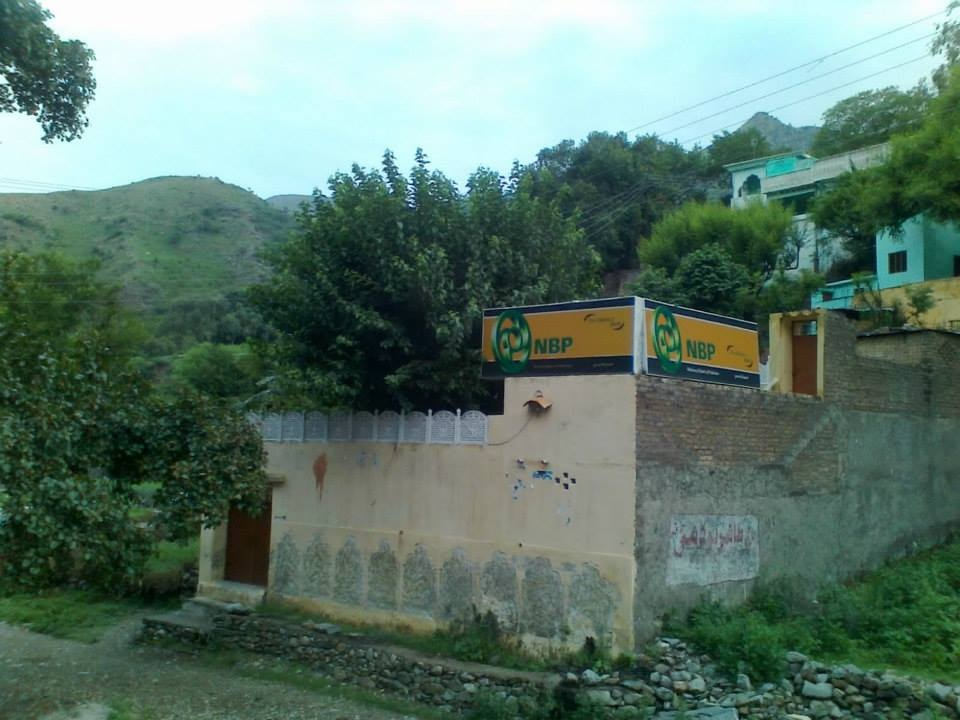
National Bank Pakistan branch

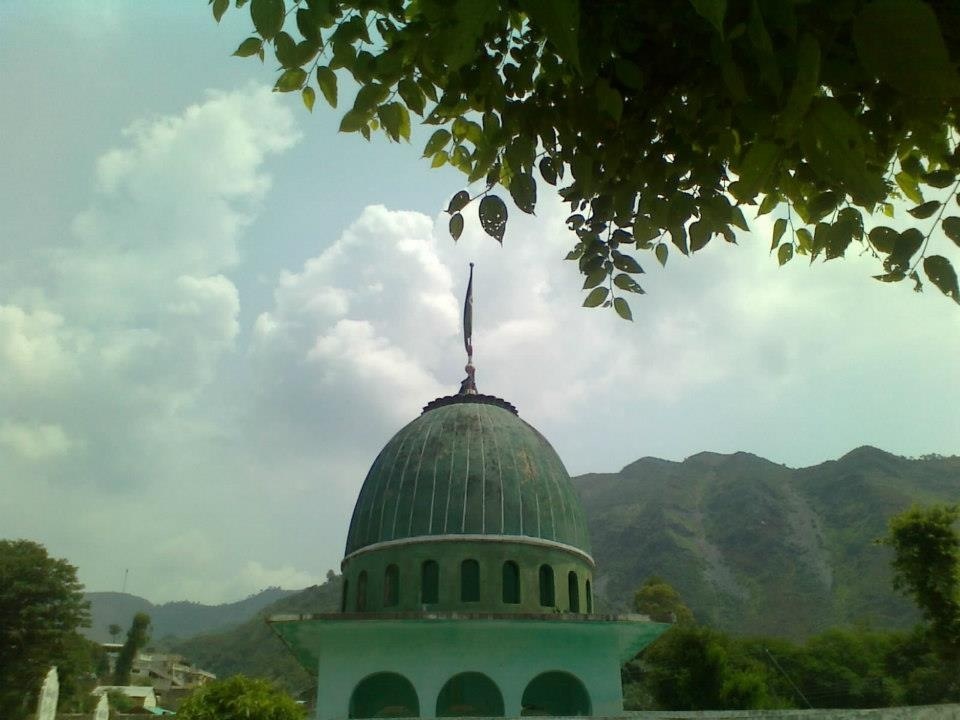
Tomb of Pir Mubarak Shah

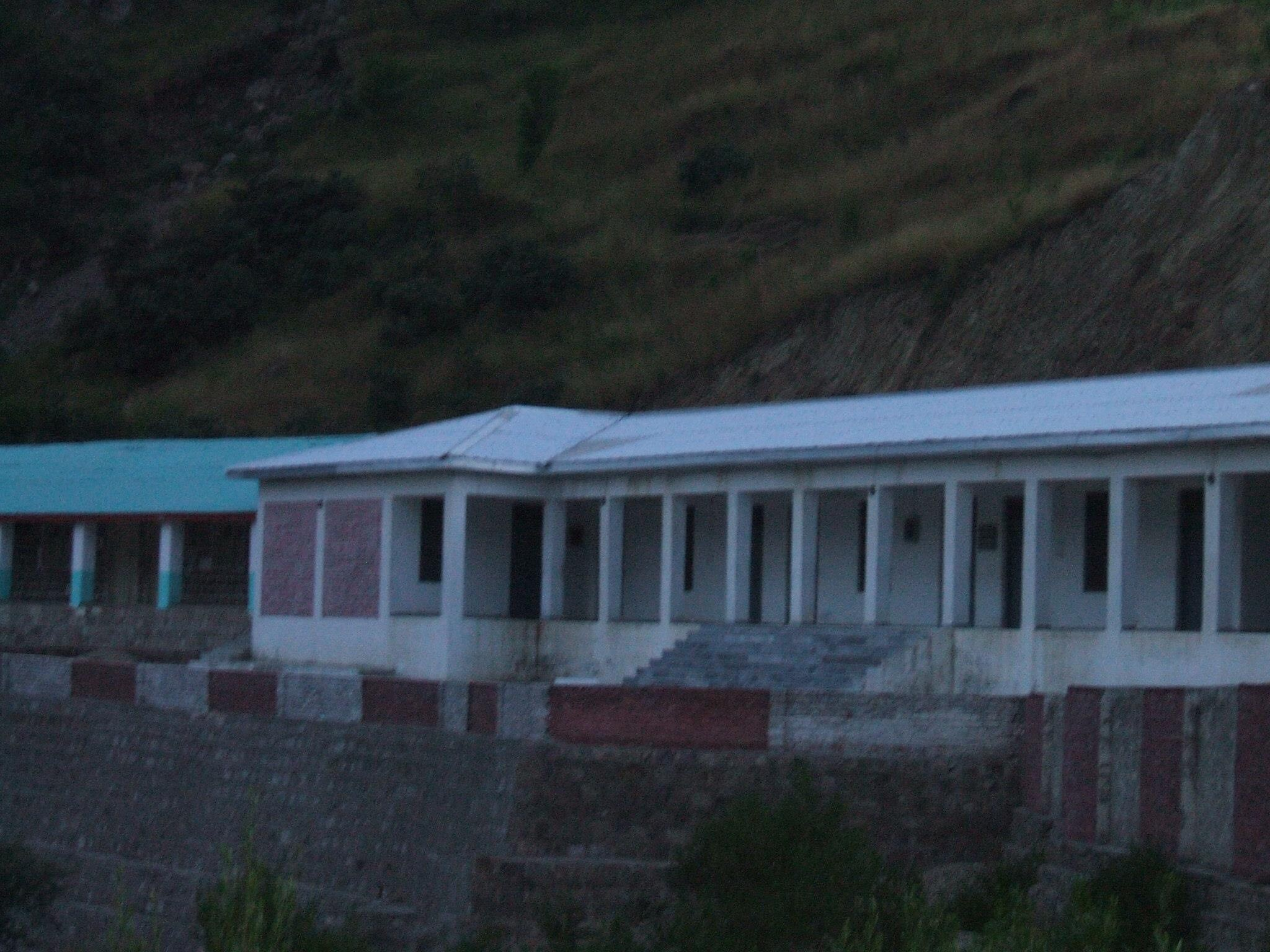
Government High School Girls

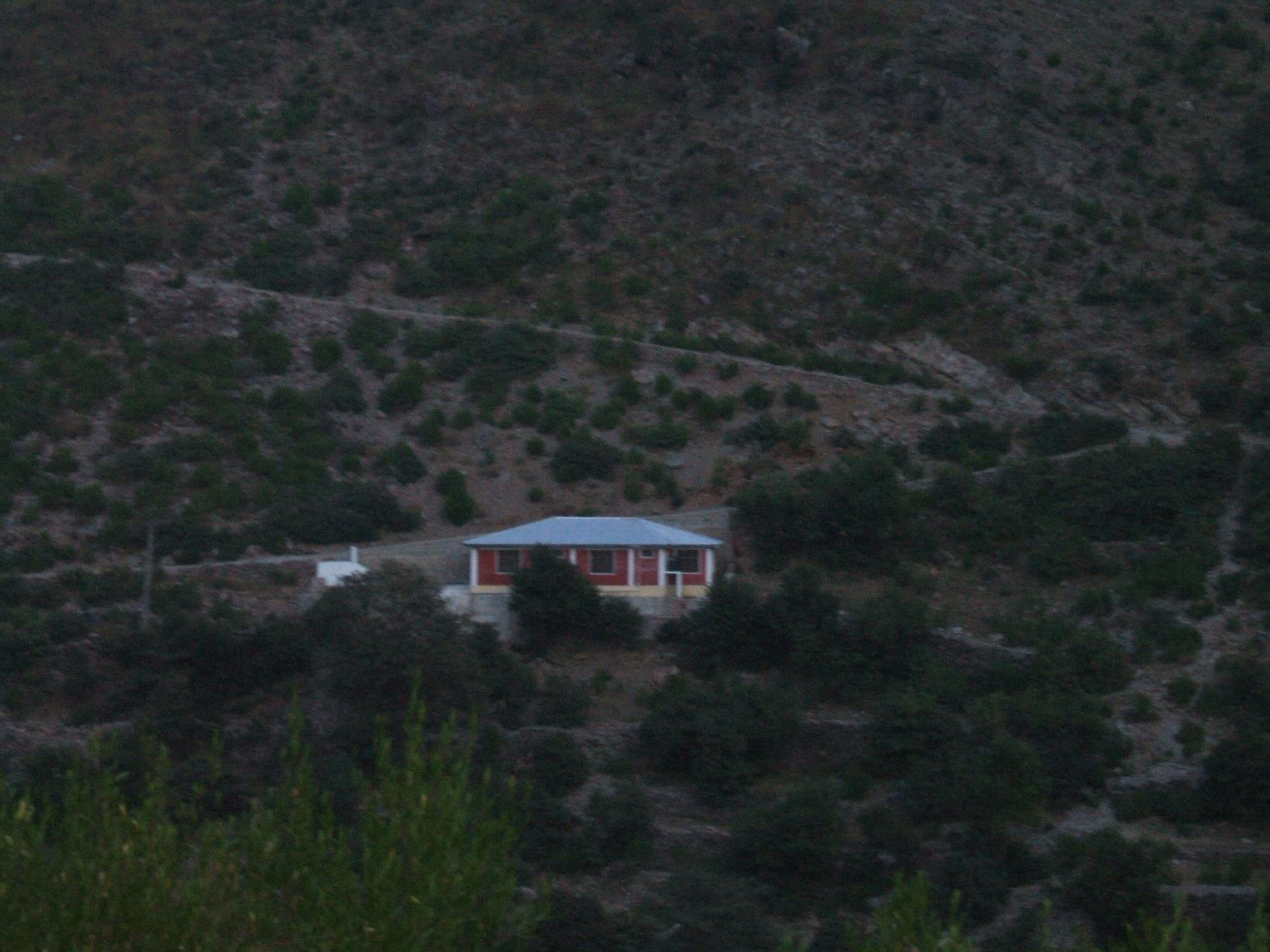
Union Council office
