= Hasanpur, Mansehra =

Hasan Pur
- Village
- Country: Pakistan
- Region: Khyber Pakhtunkhwa
- District: Mansehra District
- Time zone: UTC+5 (PST)

Hasanpur is a small village of union council Malikpur, District Mansehra, situated between the villages of Sherpur and Malikpur in Khyber Pakhtunkhwa province, Pakistan. Khuwajgan Bazaar is a popular market near Sherpur, where all necessary things are available.
