= Jarral, Abbottabad =

Pakistani village

Jarral جرل
- Jarral
- Location within Khyber Pakhtunkhwa Location within Pakistan
- Coordinates: 34°08′55.27″N 73°02′48.24″E
- Country: Pakistan
- Province: Khyber Pakhtunkhwa
- District: Abbottabad
- Tehsil: Abbottabad

Population (2017)
  - Total: 7,952
- Time zone: PKT (UTC+05:00)
- ZIP code: 22760

Jarral (Hindko: جرناں) is a village in Abbottabad District in the Khyber Pakhtunkhwa province of Pakistan, it serves as the headquarters of Jarral Shareef Union Council. According to the 2017 census the village consists of 462 households with an average household size of 5.93. The total population in 2017 was 2,746 which had risen to 2,851 in 2023.

== Location ==
Jarral is 37 kilometres (23 mi) from the city of Abbottabad and is located at 34°8'57N 73°2'47E in a valley surrounded by large mountains on three sides, to the south-west of Jarral lies the Tarbela Dam lake.
