= Allgemeine Anzeigen GmbH =

Allgemeine Anzeigen GmbH, abbreviated Ala (English: General Advertisements, Ltd.) was a central advertising agency of the Nazi Party, created in 1926 from "Ausland GmbH" (Foreign Lands, Ltd.). It was part of the Alfred Hugenberg group, taken over by the Eher Press in 1934 in order to improve the advertising position of the National Socialist Gau presses.

== Founding ==
Prior to the First World War, members of German industrial enterprises wished to increase the global representation of their exports within the media. On March 6, 1914, Alfred Hugenberg, then director of the Krupp company, initiated the formation of the Auslands GmbH, a corporation set up with an initial capital of 200,000 marks, registered to the Essen Register of Associations under number 14211, on April 28, 1914. A variety of notable industrialists such as Emil Kirdorf, Hugo Stinnes, Wilhelm Benkenberg, Fritz Baare, Peter Klöckner, Paul Reusch, the Stumm brothers, and Friedrich Springorum took part in its foundation.

The organisation was established to promote and strengthen the ties between Rhenish industry and significant external economic and cultural areas, with the goal of augmenting communication through the implementation of suitable measures. In order to fund its activities, the society had authorisation to partake in any transactions that were pertinent to its goals.

== Stakeholder Composition ==
On April 14, 1918, the magazine Zeitschrift Nachrichten für Wertpapierbesitzer (News for Shareholders) named the 200 shareholders of Ala GmbH which included Borsig (Berlin), Vulkan-Werke, Buderussche Eisenwerke, Bochumer Gußstahlverein, Maschinenbaugesellschaft Schwartzkopff (Berlin), Friedrich Krupp, Mannesmann, Hoesch, Rheinische Metallwaren, Norddeutscher Lloyd, Rheinische Stahlwerke, die Woermann-Linie (the Woermann Line), Manoli Cigarette Factory, das Kalisyndikat, Waggonfabrik (Wagon Factory) Linke-Hofmann-Werke, Phoenix-Bergbau, Rütgers-Werke, chemical factory Goldschmidt, die Essener Kreditanstalt (the Essen Credit Institution), Deutsch-Luxemburgische and Gelsenkirchener Mining Company, Verein für das Deutschtum im Ausland (Association for Germans Abroad) and the Banking Company of Delbrück, Schickler & Co.

By 1919, the number of shareholders in the limited liability company had risen to 400, and an addition of 75 newspaper publishers in the year 1922.

== Interaction with Competitors & Opponents ==
In order to challenge Rudolf Mosse's monopoly of the German advertisement market, the GmbH altered its strategy to include an investment principle based on a cooperation model; this enabled the formation of a joint venture society consisting of shareholders investing no more than 500 Marks each. This concept, coined by Leo Wegener as the 'Cooperative of Advertisers', sought to attract numerous shareholders.

In 1916, the archive department of Ala Advertisements GmbH was founded to collect information related to advertisement placement in domestic and foreign newspapers. It cooperated with the German Overseas Service Syndicate, leading to the establishment of Deutsche Archiv GmbH on May 23, 1917. To protect the naming rights, Auslands Anzeige GmbH was founded on September 5, 1917, taking over operations from Ala Anzeige GmbH. Auslands Anzeige GmbH was eventually dissolved in 1927.

Meanwhile, the Ala's activities expanded to include economics consulting as well as offering assistance in the design of advertisements and the creation of sales opportunities. In 1917, Ala GmbH underwent a major transformation when it purchased the majority of shares in Haasestein & Vogler AG from its shareholder Charles Georg. The acquisition included control of Haasestein & Vogler AG's extensive advertising network and their subsidiary; Daube & Co. On December 16, 1919, a new company based on this acquisition was formed and named Ala United Advertising Companies, Haasenstein & Vogler AG, Daube & Co. mbH. Two years later, this company was taken over by Ala Advertisements AG.

The rapid growth of Ala GmbH raised concerns that advertising brokerage could be employed to exert influence over the press. The Düsseldorfer Volkszeitung, connected to the Social Democrats, published an editorial on November 22, 1915, expressing alarm over the potential of Ala GmbH to compromise the interests of the underprivileged. In response, Mosse's company initiated a public awareness campaign in 1916 to champion the organisation in a campaign entitled Die Unabhängigkeit der Presse ist bedroht! ('The Independence of the Press is Threatened!'), which culminated in February 1918 with a published article by Professor Walter Goetz in the Leipziger Tageblatt, Die Vaterlandspartei ('The Fatherland Party'). The article by Goetz attacked Ala GmbH for its close ties with industrial conglomerates.

In February 1918, Matthias Erzberger took up the issue of monopolization of German advertising businesses in his Reichstag speech. He attacked heavy industry, den Alldeutschen Verband (the Pan-German Association) and the Deutsche Vaterlandspartei (German Fatherland Party) for their involvement in the Ala GmbH. In response, the management of Ala GmbH authorised and distributed an official statement, entitled Die Ala und ihre Gegner (The Ala and its opponents). The statement refuted the notion that it was monopolising the advertising business and instead suggested that this accusation was more appropriately aimed at Mosse's business. The public debate around this matter unfolded in the Deutsche Tageszeitung and the Berliner Tageblatt and was even addressed in England, as exemplified in The Times' March 1918 article about the Krupp press.

In 1922, the Wirtschaftsstelle der Provinzpresse GmbH (Wipro) was established in Berlin to provide services to small newspaper publishers in the midst of high inflation. These services included a cost-efficient Maternkorrespondenz (referring to the delivery of news material from big cities to district and local newspapers), which enabled local publishers to obtain material for an entire newspaper, leaving only the design of a local news section.

The subsidiary company, Ala, acquired advertisement orders from Wipro at prices that were up to 50 percent lower than its competitors; this was widely criticised by the Weltbühne publication "Hugenberg versucht, durch seine Annoncenexpedition Ala-Haasenstein & Vogler-Daube den redaktionellen Teil zu kaufen.“ ("Hugenberg tried to buy the editorial part through his advertising expedition Ala-Haasenstein & Vogler-Daube.") in 1926. Arno Meyer's doctoral thesis, accepted by LMU Munich in 1926, addressed the implications of this practice. He noted that these financial arrangements enabled less efficient newspapers to reduce costs and feature advertising sections that were larger, more varied, and more attractive. Nevertheless, Meyer cautioned that media outlets using this association risked becoming increasingly dependent on the relevant business entities. Moreover, Emil Dovifat and Otto Groth voiced similar criticism of Hugenberg.

== Bibliography ==
- Christian Zentner, Friedemann Bedürftig (1991). The Encyclopedia of the Third Reich. Macmillan, New York. ISBN 0-02-897502-2
