= Umar Daraz Khallil =

Pakistani actor

- Born: Chamkani, Peshawar
- Died: Peshawar
- Occupations: Actor, Clerk
- Known for: Lewanai (drama)

Umar Daraz Khalil was a Pakistani actor. He began his Pashto film career in 1971, starring in the film Darra Khayber.

== Early life ==
Daraz was born in Chamkani Village in the suburbs of Peshawar and is the son of film and stage actor Khalil Khan.Brother of ishrat Abbas, Jalil Khan(late). He joined the Water and Power Development Authority (WAPDA) as a clerk until moving to Lahore in order to pursue acting. His younger brother, Ishrat Abbas, is also a TV actor and has performed in a number of Hindko, Pashto and Urdu plays.

== Career ==
Umar Daraz began his acting career with a PTV play in 1968. In 1971, Daraz embarked on his Pashto film career, playing a defiant tribal chieftain in Dara Khyber. According to his younger brother, Ishrat Abbas, Daraz was never cast as the hero of a film. He played the villain in nearly 700 Pashto films and 350 Urdu and Punjabi films. He acted in Pashto and Hindko dramas. Daraz's hit Pashto movies include Goongai, Speen Sterge, Da Oche Khan, Khabara Da Izzat Daa, and Lewanai. His most successful Urdu film is Ghazi Ilam Deen Shaheed, while his most well-known Punjabi film is Paani.

After the decline of the film industry, Daraz ended his film career, but later started performing in CD dramas. However, during the last part of his life, he struggled with finances.

== Recognition ==
Daraz was the recipient of numerous awards and accolades, including the President’s award for Pride of Performance.

== Death ==
The 71-year-old actor was admitted to Lady Reading Hospital in Peshawar after a paralysis attack. His funeral prayer was offered in Faqirabad in Peshawar.
