= Haji Muhammad Adeel =

Pakistani politician

- Born: 10 August 1941
- Died: 18 November 2016 (aged 75); Peshawar, Pakistan

Haji Muhammad Adeel (Urdu: حاجی محمد عدیل) (10 August 1941 – 18 November 2016) was a Pakistani senator and senior vice president of the Awami National Party.

Haji Mohammad Adeel received the Nishan-i-Imtiaz, which is the absolute highest category of civil honours in Pakistan.

He was given this supreme award by the President of Pakistan on Pakistan Day (March 24, 2011). He received it for his outstanding parliamentary services.

== Biography ==
A Hindko speaker, was from a family of anti-imperialists, the son of Hakeem Abdul Jalil (Hakeem Sahib was actively involved in the non violence movement, Khudai Khidmatgar against the British Empire in the subcontinent and was the president of All India National Congress Committee Peshawar District and a close colleague of Bacha Khan and Mahatama Gandhi and Member of Central working committee of Congress.

During his political career he served as finance minister and deputy speaker in the provincial government of Khyber-Pakhtunkhwa. He was the senator and represented Khyber Pakhtunkhwa in the National Finance Commission of Pakistan.

== Role in Senate ==
Committee(s): Haji Adeel was member of following standing committees, Standing Committee on Interior, Standing Committee on Defence and Defence Production, Standing Committee on Textile Industry, Standing Committee on Information and Broadcasting and Functional Committee on Problems of Less Developed Areas.

His senate tenure started in March 2009 and concluded in March 2015.

== Role in national politics ==
He was Parliamentary Leader in Senate of Pakistan President, Awami National Party (ANP) Pakistan, Chairman Election Commission of ANP and Coordinator ANP Lawyers. He was also Member Central & Provincial Executive Committees of ANP, Member, National Executive Committee, Pakistan India People Forum for Peace and Democracy and Member of National Steering Committee INSA (Imagine a New South Asia).

=== Civil society activist ===
Haji Adeel was a believer of Pakistan and India friendship. He was very active in campaign and led the caucus of parliamentarians for New South Asia. In 2010, Haji Muhammad Adeel declared Hindu Raja Dahir as the hero of the Pashtuns over Muhammad bin Qasim (Arab general).

Haji Adeel also supported various initiatives for Sustainable Development in Pakistan. He supported Pakistani civil society organizations and South Asian Rights groups.

=== Death ===
Haji Muhammad Adeel died of renal failure at Combined Military Hospital Peshawar on 18 November 2016.
