= Iftikhar Qaisar =

Pakistani actor

- افتخار قیصر
- Born: 1956; Peshawar
- Died: 17 September 2017 (aged 60–61)
- Occupations: Actor; writer; poet
- Years active: 1971 - 2017
- Television: PTV

Iftikhar Qaisar (1956 – 17 September 2017) was a Pakistani actor, poet, and drama writer. He acted in Urdu, Hindko and Pashto TV plays.

== Life and career ==
Born in Peshawar in 1956, Qaisar started his acting career in 1971 at PTV. He got fame for his dialogue "Ab Main Bolon Keh Na Boloun" in the Hindko drama "Dekhda Janda Reh". His acting career spanned over 40 years.

He died on 17 September 2017 in Peshawar.

== Television shows ==
Year	Title	Language	Network
1971	Nandrah		PTV
1984	Dekh Da Janda Reh	Hindko	PTV

== Awards ==
Year	Award	Category	Result	Ref.
	Pride of Performance Award	Arts	Won	
