= Muradpur, Mansehra =

Muradpur is a village situated in union council Malikpur, Mansehra District, Khyber Pakhtunkhwa province, Pakistan. The major language spoken there is Hindko or Pashto. Rtd Lt Gen Khalid Rabbani Corps Commander of Peshawar belongs to the Malik family of this village. The post office of Muradpur located there.
