= Sherpur, Mansehra =

Sherpur is a village located in Mansehra District, Khyber Pakhtunkhwa Province, about 45 kilometers east of the Indus River and 134 kilometers from Islamabad, in the lower Pakhal Valley. The major spoken language is Pashto but Hindko is also spoken.

Famous place are Government Higher Secondary school Sherpur and a small river. 85% population of this village are belong to SWATI tribe. Major four families of Swati are living here, including BATUKHEL, BULANDERKHEL, AJAKHEL, JAHANGIRI, and RAMZOKHEL. The popular market near to Sherpur is Khuwajgan Bazaar where all necessary thing of life are available.

== See also ==
- Hasanpur, Mansehra, village near Sherpur
