= Riffat Akbar Swati =

Pakistani politician

Riffat Akbar Swati is a former member of the provincial assembly from Mansehra District, in the Khyber-Pakhtunkhwa province of Pakistan.

She was born on 20 October 1946 into a Kashmiri Rajput family. They moved to Abbottabad after partition of India in 1947.

She married into a Swati family of Mansehra.

== Riffat Akbar's credit ==
It goes to Riffat Akbar Swati's credit that she introduced Dr.Syed Mehboob renowned research scholar, writer and columnist to Hindko circle and persuaded him to write in Hindko. Dr. Syed Mehboob is a multilingual writer and writes in English, Urdu, Hindko and Sindhi languages. His Hindko articles published in monthly Farogh " Peshawar.
