= Malikpura Urban =

Coordinates: 34.0000°N 73.0000°E

- Union council
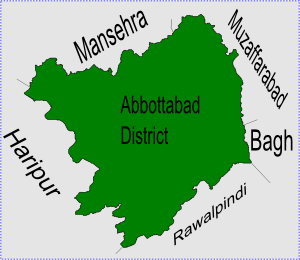
- Malikpura Urban
- Interactive map of Malikpura Urban
- Country: Pakistan
- Province: Khyber-Pakhtunkhwa
- District: Abbottabad
- Tehsil: Abbottabad

Government
  - Nazim: Muhammad Jehangir Khan
  - Naib Nazim: Sher Dil

Malikpura Urban is one of the 51 union councils of Abbottabad District in Khyber-Pakhtunkhwa province of Pakistan. It is located in the west of the district.

== Villages ==
- Muradpur, Mansehra
