= Halae (Cilicia) =

Coastal town of ancient Cilicia

Coordinates: 36°50′01″N 35°52′32″E

Halae or Halai (Ancient Greek: Ἁλαί), or Alae or Alai (Ἄλαι), was a coastal town of ancient Cilicia, inhabited during the Roman and Byzantine eras.

Its site is located near Alakese in Asiatic Turkey.
