= Peter Klöckner =

German industrialist (1863–1940)

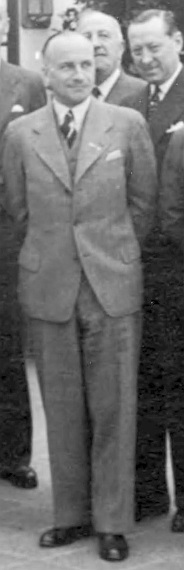

City councilor in Duisburg
- In office 1919–1929

Member of the Prussian State Council
- In office 1921–1933

Personal details
- Born: November 9, 1863 Koblenz
- Died: October 5, 1940 (aged 76) Duisburg
- Occupation: businessman
- Known for: Klöckner & Co

Peter Klöckner (November 9, 1863 – October 5, 1940) was a German businessman and industrialist.

== Life and work ==
Peter Klöckner was the second of nine children born to the Koblenz shipbuilder and shipyard owner Peter Klöckner and his wife Anna Maria, née Wenner.

He left Gymnasium (secondary school) before taking his Abitur examinations. From 1882 to 1884, he did a commercial apprenticeship at Carl Spaeter in Koblenz, the largest German iron trading group at the time. After his apprenticeship, he remained on as a commercial clerk. Between 1886 and 1888, he served as an accounting clerk at Luxemburger Bergwerks- und Saarbrücker Eisenhütten AG in Burbach, where, during night shifts, he acquired practical knowledge of steelmaking at the plant's reheating, puddling, and blast furnaces.

From 1888 to 1897, he represented the Spaeter company in the Ruhr region as a clerk in its Duisburg branch. When this branch was transformed into an independent company in 1897, he rose to partner and managing director. In addition, in 1894, he began investing in iron mills, steelworks, banks (Mittelrheinische Bank, Mülheimer Bank, A. Schaaffhausen'scher Bankverein), smelting groups, and machine-building plants. He reorganized various companies, including Eisen- und Stahlwerk Krieger und Co. in the Haspe district of Hagen, Düsseldorfer Eisen- und Drahtindustrie AG, Sieg-Rhein-Hütte in Troisdorf, and Lothringer Hüttenverein Aumetz-Friede. These activities earned him the reputation amongst contemporariers for being a "doctor for ailing companies" in German industry. Through these reorganization measures, he gained control of the companies.

=== Activity as entrepreneur ===
However, the position of managing director and partner at Spaeter's subsidiary afforded Peter Klöckner too little scope for his ambitions, and in 1906 he co-founded the general partnership Klöckner & Co in Duisburg with his brother Florian Klöckner. This enterprise sold the raw materials and products produced by Klöckner's holdings and became the heart of his group. In the following period, he systematically expanded his business activities to include all aspects of steel production and trading (smelting works, roller mills, mines, coking plants, shipping lines, coal trading, etc.). His goal was to create a vertically structured group that combined all processes under one roof, from the extraction and processing of raw materials to the end product.

In 1917, he converted the Lorraine smelting works into Lothringer Hütten- und Bergwerksverein AG with headquarters in Nilvingen near Kneuttingen. This group of mines, smelteries, and rolling mills included the companies Aumetz-Friede, Hauts-Fourneaus Lorrains de la Paix, and Fentsche Hüttenwerke in Kneuttingen.

=== After first World War ===
As a result of the 1919 Treaty of Versailles, all the coal and ore mines in the Lorraine region – and, with them, almost the entire foundation of the company's steel production – fell to France, which made a reorganization necessary. In 1920, Klöckner established a chemicals division as a vehicle to sell the byproducts of coal and coke production. In 1921, with the help of the state compensation he received for his lost Lorraine works, he founded Klöckner Reederei und Kohlenhandel GmbH and acquired a majority stake in Georgs-Marien Bergwerks- und Hüttenverein AG ( "Georgsmarienhütte"). The founding of Klöckner-Dünger-Handel GmbH followed in 1923. Klöckner also established regional iron trading companies in Osnabrück, Nuremberg, and Hanover – as well as a network of offices abroad – to supplement the existing trading firms in Cologne and Magdeburg/Halle. Thanks to the stable profits generated by trading, Klöckner managed to survive relatively unscathed the economic crisis after the First World War.

=== Klöckner-Werke ===
In 1923, Klöckner formed the new mining and smelting group Klöckner-Werke AG in Castrop-Rauxel by merging all the companies in which he held at least a 50-percent states. These included Eisen- und Stahlwerk Haspe, the Mannstaedt works in Troisdorf, Düsseldorfer Eisen- und Drahtindustrie, Georgsmarien-Bergwerks- und Hüttenverein, and Eisen- und Stahlwerk Osnabrück. The Victor/Ickern, Königsborn, General, and Werne mines were also incorporated into his group. In 1924, Klöckner acquired a majority holding in Rheinische Chamotte- und Dinas-Werke in Mehlem and a 50-percent stake in the nitrogen plant belonging to Gewerkschaft Victor. As chair of the supervisory board, he directed Klöckner Werke AG until his death in 1940. In 1926, he rejected an offer to merge his group with Vereinigte Stahlwerke AG, preferring to remain independent instead.

=== Klöckner-Humboldt-Deutz ===
Parallel to setting up his steel group, Peter Klöckner founded Klöckner-Humboldt-Deutz AG, which produced engines, machines, and commercial vehicles. As early as 1903, as a member of the supervisory board of A. Schaaffhausen'scher Bankverein in Cologne, he was elected to the supervisory board of Maschinenbauanstalt Humboldt in Kalk, Cologne, in order to restructure the company. Shortly before the First World War, he was appointed chairman of its supervisory board as well. Three years later, he was awarded a seat on the supervisory board of Gasmotorenfabrik Deutz, which in 1921 entered into a consortium with Maschinenfabrik Oberursel. In 1924, after Klöckner was appointed chairman of Oberursel's supervisory board, an additional consortium was formed between Maschinenbauanstalt Humboldt and Gasmotorenfabrik Deutz. Maschinenfabrik Oberursel, a producer of small engines, was also a member. In order to eliminate inefficiencies among these enterprises, Klöckner combined all of them in 1930 to form Humboldt-Deutzmotoren AG, in which his group held 70 percent of share capital. In 1936, Humboldt-Deutzmotoren rounded off its product range by taking over the ailing Magirus vehicle factory in Ulm. In 1938, all these companies formally merged under a pool agreement to form Klöckner-Humboldt-Deutz AG (KHD), which engaged in the manufacture of engines, machines, and a broad range of vehicles, including tractors, diesel locomotives, and trucks.

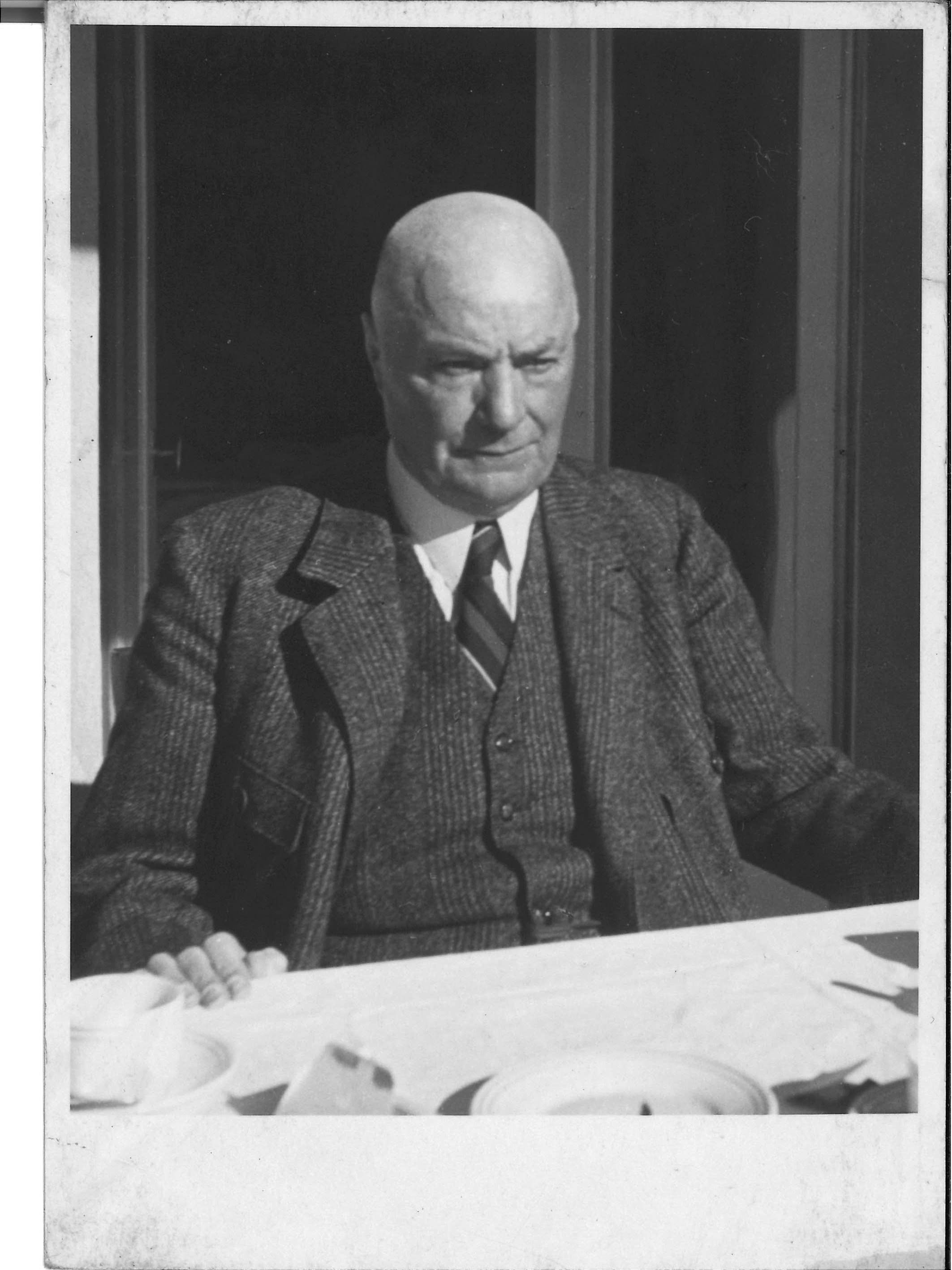
Peter Klöckner in his last years

Employing some 43,000 people, Klöckner Werke AG – which held more than 99 percent of KHD's share capital – was the fifteenth largest company in Germany on the eve of the Second World War. In 1938, it relocated its head office from Castrop-Rauxel to Duisburg.

=== Evaluation of his work ===
Peter Klöckner was one of the first businessmen to integrate different plants into a vertically structured group that reflected technical developments in steel production at the time. According to the German historian Gustav Goldbeck, he was not one of the pioneers who transformed Germany from an agricultural and small business economy into an industrial nation. Almost none of the factories he owned were founded by him, but he ensured the survival of existing companies that were not organically integrated into a meaningful industrial context, by merging them and increasing their economic efficiency. He seized opportunities, and made timely investments in coal chemistry, including synthetic nitrogen and gasoline production.

== Political and social engagement ==
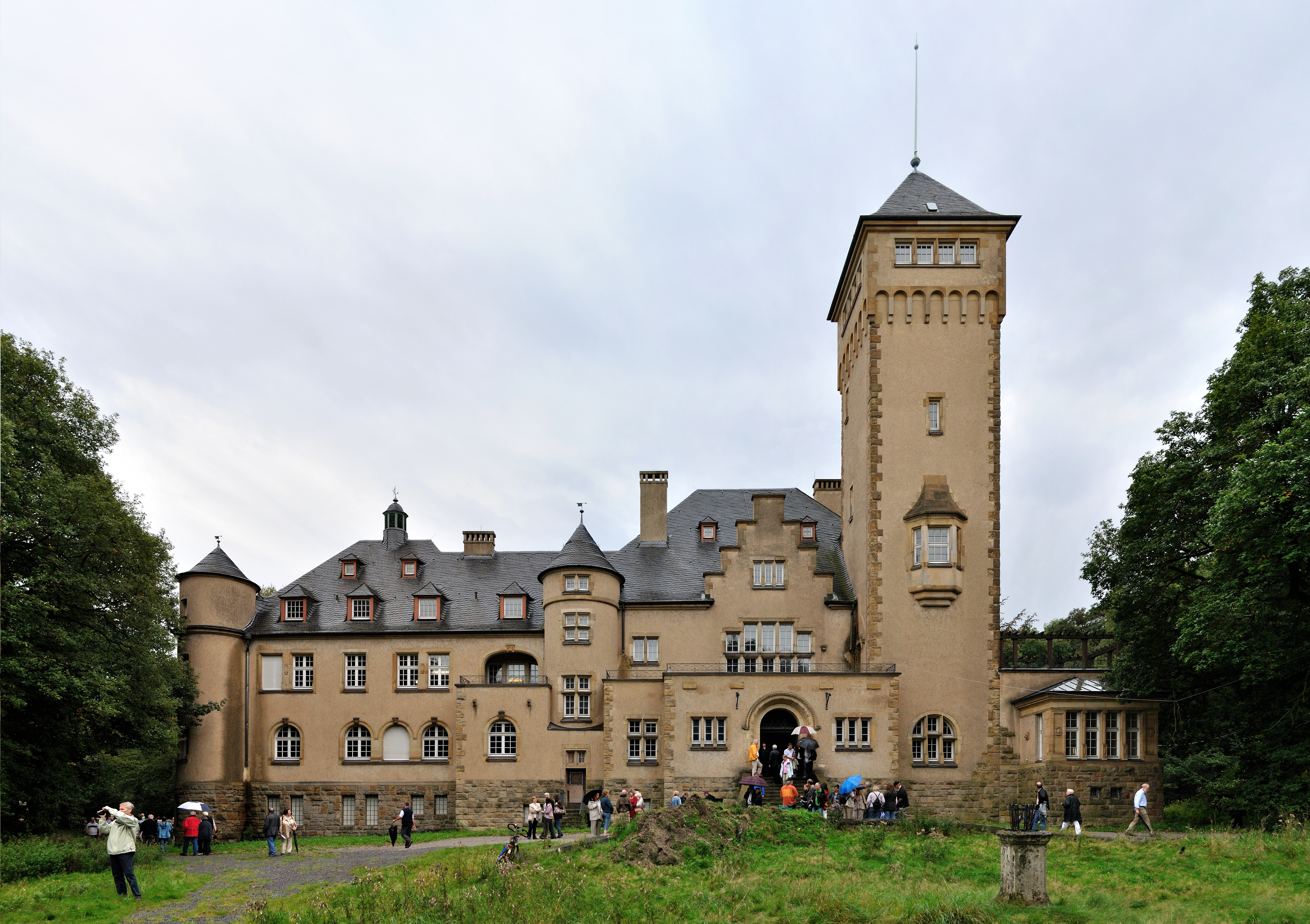
Duisburg, House Hartenfels, former residence of Peter Klöckner (~ 1910)

1919–1929 City councilor in Duisburg

1921–1933 Member of the Prussian State Council

1924–1933 Member of the executive committee and board of the Reich Association of German Industry.

1924–1933 Member of the supervisory board of Deutsche Reichsbahn.

1923–1924 As a member of the Commission of Six, formed by the Ruhr mining industry, Peter Klöckner negotiates the terms of the MICUM Agreement with the Belgian-French Control Commission for the Ruhr.

1931 Peter Klöckner heads a delegation of German industrialists on a trip to Russia, where Germany inks deals worth approximately two billion marks and becomes the Soviet Union's most important trading partner.

In addition, Peter Klöckner was a member of the following associations (as of Feb. 1930):

- German section of the International Chamber of Commerce, Berlin (from January 1926)
- Society for the Promotion of Political Education, Berlin (from June 1927)
- Municipal Political Association of the Center Party, Cologne (January 27, 1930–December 31, 1931)
- International Emigrant Aid, Berlin (from June 1928)
- Deutsches Museum, Munich (from July 1928)
- Friends of the Europäische Revue (from April 1929)
- Friends of Cologne University (from February 1928)
- Senator of the German Academy, Munich (from May 1925)
- Friends of Aachen University (member of the administrative board)

Klöckner was a member of the Ruhrlade from its founding in January 1928. In October 1937, he launched the successor group, the Kleiner Kreis.

Klöckner was a devout Catholic who often played a special role among the major German industrialists. He was a member of the Catholic Center Party, which he supported with donations. Through his younger brother, Dr. Florian Klöckner, he had access to ministry and government officials and Christian trade unions. Due to his company's role in production and trade, as well as its numerous factories outside the Ruhr region, he remained something of an outsider in the powerful industrial associations.

=== Relationship to the Nazis ===
According to a press release, after Hitler's speech at the Düsseldorf Industrial Club in January 1932, Klöckner urgently warned about Nazi "experiments". He did not join the NSDAP and viewed the Nazi state's intervention in the economy with concern, fearing expropriation. He was never appointed Wehrwirtschaftsführer, 'military economy leader' and was monitored by the Gestapo as a "politically active person". On the other hand, he did not oppose the system in any recognizable way. He occasionally expressed admiration for the Führer and adapted to the system, at least outwardly. Large parts of his group were integrated into the state-controlled military and war economy.

== Honors and awards ==
- 1905 Appointment as Commercial Councilor
- 1918 Appointment as Privy Commercial Councilor
- 1919 Awarded an honorary doctorate by the Technical University of Aachen
- 1922 Knight Commander Order of St. Gregory the Great
- 1929 Naming of a street in Koblenz after Peter Klöckner

== Literature ==
- Adenauer, Konrad. Die Briefe Konrad Adenauers an Dora Pferdmenges 1933–1949. Bonn, 2007.
- Goldbeck, Gustav. "Klöckner, Peter." Vol. 12 of Neue Deutsche Biographie (NDB), 105–107. Berlin: Duncker & Humblot, 1980. ISBN 3-428-00193-1 (Digitalisat).
- Luntowski, Gustav. Hitler und die Herren an der Ruhr: Wirtschaftsmacht und Staatsmacht im Dritten Reich. Frankfurt am Main, 2000.
- Muthesius, Volkmar. Peter Klöckner und sein Werk. Essen, 1941. Reviewed and expanded 2nd edition, Essen 1959.
- Pinner, Felix (Frank Faßland). Deutsche Wirtschaftsführer, 99–104. Die Weltbühne: Charlottenburg, Berlin, 1925.
- Pritzkoleit, Kurt. Männer Mächte Monopole: Hinter den Türen der westdeutschen Wirtschaft, 89–102. Düsseldorf, 1953.
- Pudor, Fritz, ed. Nekrologe: Aus dem rheinisch-westfälischen Industriegebiet; Jahrgang 1939–1951, 33–35. Düsseldorf, 1955.
- Reichert, Jakob. "Peter Klöckner (1863–1940)." In Rheinisch-Westfälische Wirtschaftsbiographien. Vol. 7, 85–104. Münster: Aschendorff, 1960.
- Weisbrod, Bernd. Schwerindustrie in der Weimarer Republik: Interessenpolitik zwischen Stabilisierung und Krise. Wuppertal, 1978.
- Wenzel, Georg. Deutscher Wirtschaftsführer, 1167. Hanseatische Verlagsanstalt: Hamburg, 1929.
