= Asad Qizilbash =

Pakistani sarod player (born 1963)

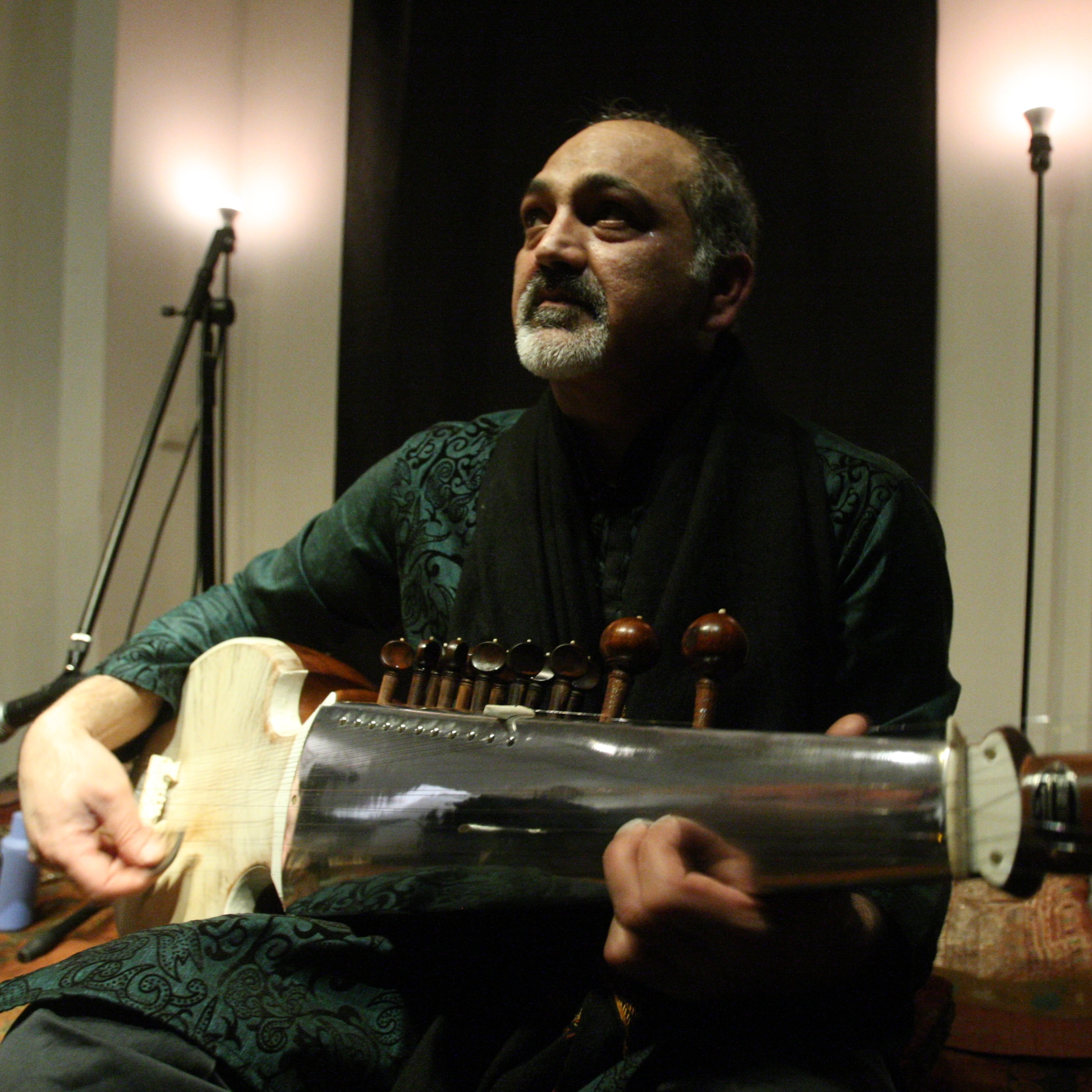

Background information
- Born: 22 September 1963 (age 62)
- Genres: Hindustani classical music
- Instrument: sarod
- Website: asadsarod.webs.com

Asad Qizilbash (born 22 September 1963) is a Pakistani sarod player.

== Biography ==
Asad was born in 1963 to the famous violinist K.H. Qizilbash, who introduced many talented Pakistani musicians to the world, Nusrat Fateh Ali Khan among others.

After attending a concert performed by India’s most legendary Sarod player, Amjad Ali Khan, Asad decided to devote himself to the instrument. As a result Asad listened to many recordings by Amjad Ali Khan, practising the Sarod and putting his mind and soul into it. The discovery of his master’s live performance became the paradigm for his music. In 1992 Asad became the only recognised Sarod player in the country and five years later he received Ganda Band Shagerd of Ustad Amjad Ali Khan in New Delhi.

=== 1973 ===
Asad Qizilbash started learning violin when he was around 8 years old. At 10 years age, he was asked to perform in a function patronized by UNICEF: "The Universal Children Day", Islamabad. It was his first public performance.

=== 1975 ===
Asad Qizilbash became a performing member of the Children's Art Workshop" at the Pakistan National Council of Arts (PNCA). He was playing violin and the guitar. He remained member of this workshop till 1982, when he left for the Middle East. During those days he used to play daily at the workshop. At that same period, he signed a contract with the Pakistan Television PTV.

=== 1981 ===
Asad Qizilbash was selected with some other musicians to represent Pakistan at the Atatürk Festival, in Ankara. He was playing violin and guitar. This was an invitation from the Radio-Television authorities of Turkey. The same year he met Ustad Amjad Ali Khan in Pakistan, for the first time.

=== 1983 and 1984 ===
"KASBEY QAMAL", a television series by PTV where Asad Qizilbash performed the Sarod and violin. "PANGNAT", a television series by the PTV where Asad Qizilbash was performing for the musical background

=== 1990 and 1992 ===
Sarod concerts at the Tagore Institute in Bonn, Federal Republic of Germany.

=== 1993-94-97-98 ===
Since his return to Pakistan in 1992, Asad Qizilbash is mainly playing the Sarod. His talent is largely recognized and he has performed already in four Rag Rang. These are very exclusive concerts reserved only for classical musicians of the highest level.

=== 1993 ===
"RASELAY LOG" a television series by the PTV where Asad Qizilbash was performing sarod.

=== 1994 ===
"SATNBY STUDIO", a special program run during the election campaign where Asad Qizilbash was participating in a music event with other musicians.

=== 2000 ===
Asad Qizilbash performs live at the Marcus Mingus Jazz Club in Brussels, Belgium.

=== 2003 ===
Asad performs for Peter Gabriel’s WOMAD in the UK.

=== 2005 ===
Chinese Minister of Culture invites Asad to perform on the 7th Asia Art Festival in Foshan.

=== 2006 ===
Asad Qizilbash performs live at the Tree & Leaf in Brussels and at the Dranouter Festival for the Pax Mundial project with Patrick Riguelle and Jan Hautekiet. Asad also plays on the track 'Bodyless Friend' by Sutrastore (written by Christophe Calis).

=== 2007 ===
Asad Qizilbash signs a publishing, recording and production contract with womb Editions in Brussels.

Together with Andrew Goldberg (Producer, womb Editions) and Pely (Producer, Cut Productions), Asad recorded his first solo album, The Magic of the Sarod. From a total of 90 minutes of recorded music, Qizilbash performs live, four Ragas and one traditional Folk Tune ranging between early morning and midnight moods.
