= Mahjabin Qazalbash =

Pakistani pashto singer

Mahjabin Qazalbash (Pashto: ماہ جبین قزلباش; 1958 – 26 February 2020) was a Pashto singer from Peshawar, Khyber Pakhtunkhwa, Pakistan. She also sang in Urdu, Punjabi, Hindko, Sindhi, Seraiki, Persian and Turkish. She earned the title of Bulbul-i-Sarhad ("The Frontier Nightingale") for her melodious voice. She was the recipient of numerous awards, including the President’s Pride of Performance. She also worked in Pashto plays, but focused on her singing.

== Personal life ==
She was born in Peshawer, Pakistan in 1958. Her real name was Surraya Begum. Her father was of Turko-Persian Qazalbash origin, who had migrated to Peshawar from Qandahar, Afghanistan. She started singing at the age of 13. She was married to Amanullah Khan Orakzai alias Aimal Khan who was a Pashto film actor.

== Career ==
She started singing when she was studying at school, as her teachers encouraged her to sing. Afterwards, she started her career at Radio Pakistan Peshawar, and later at Pakistan Television.

== Death ==
Mahjabin Qazalbash died on 26 February 2020 in Peshawar. She left behind two sons and a daughter.
