= Acetylated lanolin alcohol =

Names
- Other names: Acetic acid, esters with lanolin alcohols; Lanolin, alcohols, acetates; Lanolin alcohol, acetylated

Identifiers
CAS Number	61788-49-6
ECHA InfoCard	100.057.237
EC Number	262-980-8
UNII	SNN716810P
CompTox Dashboard (EPA)	DTXSID401009932
- Except where otherwise noted, data are given for materials in their standard state (at 25 °C [77 °F], 100 kPa). Infobox references

Acetylated lanolin alcohol (sometimes known as sheep alcohol, lanolin alcohol, or wool alcohol) is a non-drying organic compound produced from lanolin, the fat of wool shearings, which has been reacted with acetic acid and a small amount of lye. There are synthetic variants available; however, the animal-derived product has more anti-allergenic tendencies. Acetylated lanolin alcohol is used as an emollient, to soften skin, but is mildly comedogenic, with a rating of 0-2 out of 5. For this reason, those who are prone to whiteheads and blackheads should patch test before using on a large scale. Acetylated lanolin alcohol can also be inflammatory to those with wool or lanolin allergies, and should be avoided in such cases.
