= Gul Bandi =

Pakistani village

Gul Bandi Gulband, Gulbānd
- Location within Pakistan
- Coordinates: 34.13139°N 73.04611°E
- Country: Pakistan
- Province: Khyber Pakhtunkhwa
- District: Abbottabad
- Elevation: 1,276 m (4,186 ft)
- Time zone: UTC+5 (PST)

Gul Bandi is a village of Abbottabad District in the Khyber Pakhtunkhwa province of Pakistan. It is locate at 34°7'53N 73°2'46E at an elevation of 1276m and lies in an area that was affected by the 2005 Kashmir earthquake, its population according to the 2017 census was 619.
