= Malik Tariq Awan =

Pakistani politician

Member of the Provincial Assembly of Khyber Pakhtunkhwa
- Incumbent
- Assumed office February 2024
- Constituency: PK-82 Peshawar-XI

Personal details
- Born: Peshawar District, Khyber Pakhtunkhwa, Pakistan
- Political party: PMLN (2024-present)

Malik Tariq Awan is a Pakistani politician from Peshawar District. He is currently serving as member of the Provincial Assembly of Khyber Pakhtunkhwa since Feb 2024.

== Career ==
He contested the 2024 general elections as an Independent candidate from PK-82 Peshawar-XI. He secured 20,334 votes while the runner-up was Kamran Khan Bangash of Pakistan Tehreek-e-Insaf who secured 14,030 votes.
