= Ahmad Ali Saayein =

Hindko Sufi poet (1842–1937)

Ahmed Ali Saayein
- Born: Ahmed Ali; 1842; Peshawar, Sikh Empire
- Died: 1937 (aged 94–95); Peshawar, North-West Frontier Province, British India
- Occupation: Sufi poet
- Known for: Hindko poetry

Ahmad Ali Saayein (1842 – 1937) was a Sufi and a Hindko poet. He is regarded as a major literary figure of Hindko. He was a contemporary of the Urdu and Persian poet Muhammad Iqbal.

== Early life and education ==
Born into a middle-class family in Peshawar in 1842, Saayein never had an opportunity for any formal school education. Facing financial hardships, he spent part of his life in Rawalpindi where he was accommodated by a friend.

== Career ==
Saayein used to recite his poetry orally and none of his works was published during his lifetime. He was illiterate but possibly familiar with the poetry of great Persian poets like Hafiz Sheerazi and Sheikh Saadi, as one can see their influences on his poetic themes. He participated in numerous poetry circles, including the renowned literary event "Bazm-e-Sukhan", which brought together poets, writers, and critics in the early 20th century Peshawar. Besides Peshawar city, he also had a fan following in the Pothohari region owing to his stay in Rawalpindi. His oral poetry was compiled in book form titled "Ganjeena Saayien" by the Gandhara Hindko Board in 2018.

== Poetic style ==
Saayein creates poetry primarily in the Hindko language, yet he can employ metaphors that had been used by Persian poets. He makes extensive use of Persian poets' common vocabulary, adjectives, ideas, metaphors, and allegories. His poetry reflects themes of Islamic mysticism and human values. Belief in classical monotheism is central to his poetic approach.

== Works ==
- Ganjeena Saayein — Collected poetry

== Death ==
Saayein died in 1937 in Peshawar. His burial place is located outside the Kohati Gate.
