= Acta Linguistica Asiatica =

- Discipline: linguistics
- Language: English, Slovene
- Edited by: Andrej Bekeš, Nina Golob, Mateja Petrovčič

Publication details
- History: 2011-present
- Publisher: Ljubljana University Press (Slovenia)
- Frequency: Biannual

Standard abbreviations
- ISO 4: Acta Linguist. Asiat.

Indexing
- ISSN: 2232-3317
- OCLC no.: 780870032

Links
- Journal homepage; Online access; Online archive

Acta Linguistica Asiatica is a peer-reviewed academic journal covering research on languages of Asia, their translation and teaching. It is published by Ljubljana University Press.

== Abstracting and indexing ==
The journal is abstracted and indexed in:

- Index Islamicus
- MLA International Bibliography
- Scopus
