= Hindko =

Indo-Aryan language spoken in Pakistan

- ہندکو
- Hindko in Shahmukhi
- Native to: Pakistan
- Region: Hazara Division, Peshawar, Kohat, Pothohar Plateau
- Native speakers: 5–7 million (2017–2020)
- Language family: Indo-European: Indo-Iranian; Indo-Aryan; Northwestern; Punjabi; Lahnda; Hindko
- Dialects: Peshawari; Kohati; Awankari, Ghebi, Chacchi; Hazara Hindko
- Writing system: Shahmukhi

Language codes
- ISO 639-3: Either: hnd – Southern Hindko hno – Northern Hindko
- Glottolog: hind1271
- The proportion of people with Hindko as their mother tongue in each Pakistani District as of the 2017 Pakistan Census

A Hindko speaker.

Hindko (ہندکو, romanised: Hindko, IPA: [ˈɦɪnd̚koː]) is a polyphyletic label for a diverse group of Lahnda dialects spoken by several million people of various ethnic backgrounds in several areas in northwestern Pakistan, primarily in the province of Khyber Pakhtunkhwa and northwestern areas of Punjab.

The name "Hindko" means "the Indian language" or "language of Hind", (Note: "Indian" here refers to the historic meaning of India as the northern Indian subcontinent, which was known as Hindustan or Hind, the word from which the term "Hindko" is derived.) and refers to the Indo-Aryan speech forms spoken in the northern Indian subcontinent, in contrast to Pashto itself, a neighbouring Iranic language spoken by the Pashtun people. An alternative local name for this language group is Hindki. (Note: The term Hindki normally refers to a Hindko speaker.) A speaker of Hindko may be referred to as Hindki, Hindkun, or Hindkowan (Hindkuwan).

Like other Lahnda varieties, Hindko is derived from the Shauraseni Prakrit. Hindko to some extent is mutually intelligible with Standard Punjabi and Saraiki, and has more affinities with the latter than with the former.

There is a nascent language movement, and in recent decades Hindko-speaking intellectuals have started promoting the view of Hindko as a separate language. There is a literary tradition based on Peshawari, the urban variety of Peshawar in the northwest, and another one based on the language of Abbottabad in the northeast. In the 2023 census of Pakistan, 5.6 million people declared their language to be Hindko, while a 2020 estimate placed the number of speakers at 7 million.

== Geographic distribution and dialects ==
Varieties of Hindko are primarily spoken in a core area in the district of Attock in the northwestern corner of the province of Punjab, and in two neighbouring regions: in Peshawar to the north-west, and Hazara to the north-east, both in the province of Khyber Pakhtunkhwa (formerly known as the North-West Frontier Province). The Hindko of Hazara also extends east into nearby regions of Azad Kashmir.

The central dialect group comprises Kohati (spoken in the city of Kohat and a few neighbouring villages in Khyber Pakhtunkhwa) and the three closely related dialects of Attock District, Punjab: Chacchi (spoken in Attock and Haripur tehsils), Ghebi (spoken to the south in Pindi Gheb Tehsil) and Awankari (spoken in Talagang Tehsil, now part of Chakwal District). Rensch's classification based on lexical similarity (Note: Lexical similarity was calculated on the basis of a 210-item wordlist elicited in the following localities: the city of Peshawar; rural Peshawar District: Wad Pagga and Pakha Gholam; Kohati: the city of Kohat; Attock: Attock City and Talagang; Hazara: three settlements of Mansehra District: Balakot, Sherpur and Mansehra City; two in Haripur District: Singo Di Garhi and Jammun (near Ghazi) (Rensch 1992, pp. 53–58)) also assigns to this group the rural dialects of Peshawar District. Shackle, however, sees most (Note: The exception is the divergent Khālsavī dialect of the Tappa Khālsā group of villages east of the city.) of them as closely related to the urban variety of Peshawar City.

In a group of its own is Peshawari, (Note: The local pronunciation is [pɪʃʌori]) (Shackle 1980, p. 497).) the prestigious urban variety spoken in the city of Peshawar and the one that is promoted as a standardised literary language. It has a wide dialectal base and has undergone the influence of Urdu and Standard Punjabi.

A separate group is formed in the northeast by the relatively homogeneous dialects of the Hazara region, which are collectively known as Hazara Hindko or Northern Hindko, with the variety spoken in Kaghan Valley known as Kaghani, and the variety of Tanawal known variously as Tanoli Hindko, Tanoli or Tinauli. Hindko is also spoken further east into Kashmir. It is the predominant language of the Neelum Valley, in the north of Pakistan-administered Azad Kashmir, where it is locally known as Parmi (or Pārim; the name likely originated in the Kashmiri word apārim 'from the other side', which was the term used by the Kashmiris of the Vale of Kashmir to refer to the highlanders, who spoke this language). This variety is also spoken across the Line of Control into Indian-administered Jammu and Kashmir.

The whole dialect continuum of Hindko is partitioned by Ethnologue into two languages: Northern Hindko (ISO 639-3 code: hno) for the dialects of Hazara, and Southern Hindko (ISO 639-3: hnd) for the remaining varieties. This grouping finds support in the results of the intelligibility testing done by Rensch, which also found out that the southern dialects are more widely understood throughout the Hindko area than are the northern ones.

Hindko dialects gradually transition into other varieties of Lahnda and Punjabi to the south. For example, to the southwest across the Salt Range are found dialects of Saraiki, and at least one of these — the one spoken in the Dera Ismail Khan District — is sometimes also referred to as "Hindko". To the southeast, Hindko is in a dialect continuum with Pahari–Pothwari, with the Galyat region of Abbottabad district and the area of Muzaffarabad in Azad Kashmir approximately falling on the boundary between the two.

There are Hindko diasporas in major urban centres like Karachi, as well as in some neighbouring countries.

Before the partition of British India in 1947, a substantial population of Hindkowans were Hindus and Sikhs. This population migrated en masse to India. Most of them have completely assimilated into larger Punjabi-speaking and Hindi-speaking speakers in India, with only a few elders identifying with Hindko.

There was also a small Sikh and Hindu Hindkowans diaspora in Afghanistan, who became established there during the Sikh Empire in the first half of the 19th century. Most of them emigrated to India or western countries since the war and subsequent rise of the Taliban, and the total population, being not more than 60 (as of 2024).

== Social setting ==
There is no generic name for the speakers of Hindko because they belong to diverse ethnic groups and tend to identify themselves by the larger families or castes. However, the Hindko-speaking community belonging to the Hazara Division of Khyber Pakhtunkhwa is sometimes recognised collectively as Hazarewal, while the urban settlers in the cities of Peshawar and Kohat are simply known as Pishoris and Kohatis, respectively. A large number of Hindko speakers in the Hazara Division are Pashtuns. Some of those speak Hindko as their mother tongue while others as a second language. The Hindko speaking communities in Hazara include Tahirkhelis, Swatis, Yusufzais, Jadoons, Tareens, Sayyids, Awans, Mughals, Tanolis, Turks, Qureshis and Gujars.

The most common second language for Hindko-speakers in Pakistan is Urdu and the second most common one is Pashto. In most Hindko-speaking areas, speakers of Pashto live in the same or neighbouring communities (although this is less true in Abbottabad and Kaghan Valley). The relationship between Hindko and its neighbours is not one of stable bilingualism. In terms of domains of use and number of speakers, Hindko is dominant and growing in the north-east; in Hazara for example, it is displacing Pashto as the language in use among the Swati Pathans, and in the Neelam Valley of Azad Jammu and Kashmir it is gaining ground at the expense of the minority languages like Kashmiri. In the cities of Kohat and Peshawar, on the other hand, it is Hindko that is in a weaker position. With the exodus of the Hindko-speaking Hindus and Sikhs after the partition and the consequent influx of Pashtuns into the vacated areas of the urban economy, there have been signs of a shift towards Pashto.

== Phonology ==
=== Consonants ===
Awankari and Kohati
		Labial	Dental/ Alveolar	Retroflex	Palatal	Velar	Glottal
Plosive	voiceless	p pʰ	t tʰ	ʈ ʈʰ	c cʰ	k kʰ	
Plosive	voiced	b bʱ	d dʱ	ɖ ɖʱ	ɟ ɟʱ	ɡ ɡʱ	
Fricative		f	s z		ɕ	x ɣ	ɦ
Nasal		m	n	ɳ			
Rhotic			r	ɽ			
Lateral			l				
Approximant		ʋ			j		

Hazara Hindko (parentheses indicate phonemes found only in some dialects)
		Labial	Dental/ Alveolar	Retroflex	Post-alv./ Palatal	Velar	Glottal
Plosive	voiceless	p pʰ	t tʰ	ʈ ʈʰ	tʃ tʃʰ	k kʰ	
Plosive	voiced	b	d	ɖ	dʒ	ɡ	
Fricative		f v	s z		ʃ	x ɣ	ɦ
Nasal		m	n	(ɳ)		(ŋ)	
Rhotic			r	ɽ			
Lateral			l				
Approximant					j		

Hindko contrasts stop consonants at the labial, alveolar, retroflex, palatal and velar places of articulation. The palatals have been described as pure stops (/c ɟ/) in Awankari, but as affricates (/tʃ dʒ/) in the varieties of Hazara. For the stop consonants of most varieties of Hindko there is a three-way contrast between voiced (b d ɖ dʒ ɡ), voiceless (p t ʈ tʃ k) and aspirated (pʰ tʰ ʈʰ tʃʰ kʰ). Awankari, Kohati, and the varieties of Neelum Valley of Kashmir also distinguish voiced aspirated stops (bʱ dʱ ɖʱ dʒʱ ɡʱ). The disappearance of the voiced aspirates from most Hindko varieties has been linked to the development of tone (see below).

Fricatives like /f/, /x/ and /ɣ/ are found in loans (for example from Persian), but also in native words, often as positional allophones of the corresponding stop. Some documented instances include:

- before other consonants in Kohati (/ɑːxdɑː/ 'saying' versus /ɑːkhɑː/ 'said'),
- in the middle or end of words in Peshawari (/nɪɣʊl/ 'swallow (verb)'),
- word-medially after stressed vowels in Abbottabad Hindko (/deːxɽ̃ɑː/ 'to look'),
- at the ends of words after vowels in the Hindko of Kashmir (/lɪx/ 'write').

Generally, the fricatives can be found in all positions: at the start, the middle, or at the end of the word (Tanoli Hindko: /xrɑːb/ 'spoilt', /ləxxət/ 'small stick', /ʃɑːx/ 'branch'), with relatively few exceptions (one being the restriction on word-final /ɦ/ in the Hindko of Kashmir). The labio-dental has been explicitly described as the fricative /v/ for the Hindko of Kashmir, and Tanawal, but as the approximant /ʋ/ in Awankari.

Apart from /m/ and /n/, Hindko dialects distinguish a varying number of other nasal consonants. The retroflex nasal is overall shorter than the other nasals, and at least for the Hindko of Abbottabad it has been described as a nasalised flap: /ɽ̃/. For the Hindko of Kashmir it has been asserted to be an allophone of the alveolar nasal /n/, but it is phonemic in Awankari and Tanoli; in both dialects it can occur in the middle and at the end of a word, as illustrated by the following examples from Tanoli: /tɑːɳɑ̃ː/ 'straight', /mɑːɳ/ 'pride'. The velar nasal /ŋ/ is phonemic in Tanoli: /bɑːŋ/ 'prayer call', /mɑːŋ/ 'fiancée', and in the Hindko of Kashmir, and in both cases it is found only in the middle or at the end of the word. In the main subdialect of Awankari, the velar nasal is only found before velar stops, and similarly, it is not among the phonemes identified for the Hindko of Abbottabad.

Hindko varieties have a single lateral consonant: the alveolar /l/, unlike Punjabi, which additionally has a retroflex lateral /ɭ/. The Awankari dialect, as spoken by Muslims (and not Hindus) and described by Bahri in the 1930s, has a distinctive retroflex lateral, which, however, appears to be in complementary distribution with the alveolar lateral. There are two rhotic sounds in Hindko: an alveolar trill /r/ (with a varying number of vibrations dependent on the phonetic context), and a retroflex flap /ɽ/.

=== Vowels ===
Vowels
	Front	Central		Back
Close	iː			uː
	ɪ		ʊ
Mid	eː			oː
Mid	æː
		ə
Open		ɑː

Hindko has three short vowels /ɪ/, /ʊ/ and /ə/, and six long vowels: /iː/, /eː/, /æː/, /ɑː/, /oː/ and /uː/. The vowels can be illustrated with the following examples from Tanoli: /tʃɪpp/ 'big stone', /dʊxx/ 'pain', /kəll/ 'yesterday', /biːɽɑː/ 'button', /keː/ 'what', /bæːrɑː/ 'piece of meat', /tɑːr/ 'Sunday', /tʃoːr/ 'thief', /kuːɽɑː/ 'filth'. Length is strongly contrastive and the long vowels are generally twice as long as the corresponding short vowels. The Awankari dialect distinguishes between open and close "o" (/poːlɑː/ 'soft' vs. /pɔːlɑː/ 'shoe').

Varieties of Hindko also possess a number of diphthongs (like /ai/). Which of the many (typically around a dozen) overt vowel combinations should be seen as representing an underlying single segment (a diphthong) rather than simply a sequence of two separate underlying vowels, has varied with the analysis used and the dialect studied.

==== Nasalised vowels ====
Hindko dialects possess phonemic nasal vowels (here marked with a tilde above the vowel: ɑ̃). For example, in the Hindko of Azad Kashmir /bɑː/ 'animal disease' contrasts with /bɑ̃ː/ 'arm', and /toːkeː/ 'meat cutters' with /toːkẽː/ 'hindrances'. In this variety of Hindko, as well as in the Hindko of Tanawal, there are nasal counterparts for all, or almost all, (Note: There is uncertainty about the phonemic status of /æ͂ː/: it is absent according to Nawaz (2014) (for Tanawal) and Haroon-Ur-Rashid & Akhtar (2012, pp. 70, 74) (for Azad Kashmir), but an example is adduced by Haroon-Ur-Rashid (2015b).) of the long vowels, but none for the short vowels. In Awankari and the Hindko of Abbottabad, on the other hand, there is contrastive nasalisation for short vowels as well: /kʰɪɖɑː/ 'make one play' contrasts with /kʰɪ̃ɖɑ/ 'scatter' (in Awankari), /ɡəɖ/ 'mixing' contrasts with /ɡə̃́ɖ/ 'knot'). Peshawari and Kohati presumably follow the pattern of Awankari but have historically lost nasalisation from the round vowels (like /u/ or /o/) at the end of the word.

Additionally, vowels get nasalised allophonically when adjacent to a nasal consonant. In the varieties of Tanawal and Kashmir both long and short vowels can be nasalised in this way, but only if they precede the nasal consonant: [dõːn] 'washing', [bẽːn] 'crying'. In the Hindko of Abbottabad, a vowel at the end of some words can be nasalised if it follows a nasal consonant. In the Awankari dialect, vowels can be allophonically nasalised both before and after a nasal consonant, but in either case the effect will depend on the position of stress (see Awankari dialect § Vowels for more details).

=== Tone ===
Unlike many Indo-Aryan languages, but in common with other Punjabi varieties, Hindko dialects have a system of pitch accent, which is commonly referred to as tone. In Punjabi, pitch accent has historically arisen out of the loss of voiced aspirates (/bʱ dʱ ɖʱ dʒʱ ɡʱ ɦ/. Thus in Standard Punjabi, if a voiced aspirate preceded the stressed vowel, it would lose its aspiration and cause the appearance of a high tone on that vowel: /dʒiːbʱ/ > /dʒíːb/ 'tongue'. If it followed the stressed vowel, then it would lead to a high tone and lose its aspiration and, if word-initial, its voicing: /ɡʱoːɽaː/ > /kòːɽaː/ 'horse'. The same pattern has been reported for Hazara Hindko, with a low rising tone after historically voiced aspirates (/kòːɽaː/ 'horse' < /ɡʱoːɽaː/), a high falling tone before historic voiced aspirates (/kóːɽaː/ 'leper' < /kóːɽʱaː/), and level tone elsewhere (/koːɽaː/ 'bitter'). According to preliminary observations on the Hazara Hindko variety of Abbottabad, the low tone is less prominent than in Majhi dialect, and a trace of the aspiration is preserved: for example 'horse' would be /k^{(h)}òːɽaː/.

The variety spoken to the north-east, in Neelam Valley, has preserved voiced aspirates at the start of the word, so presumably the low tone is not established there. However, there are observations of its appearance in the speech of the residents of the main villages along the highway, likely under the influence of Majhi and Hazara Hindko, and it has similarly been reported in the villages on the Indian side.

The southern Hindko varieties have similarly developed tone, but only when the voiced aspirate followed the stressed vowel; voiced aspirates preceding the stress have remained unchanged: thus /ʋə́d/ 'more' (< vədʱ), but /dʱiː/ 'daughter'. This tone is realised as high falling in Kohati and the eastern subdialect of Awankari, but as high in the northwestern Awankari subdialect. Like Kohati, the variety of Peshawar has high falling tone before historic voiced aspirates. However, it has also developed a distinct tone on stressed vowels after historic voiced aspirates, like northern Hindko and Majhi, with a similar loss of aspiration and voicing. But in contrast to Majhi, this tone is also high falling, and it is distinguished by the accompanying glottalisation: /tˀîː/ 'daughter', /vəˈtˀɑ̂ːiː/ 'congratulations'.

== Alphabet ==
"Vaf" is a unique letter of Hindko, and many Indo-Aryan language. Vaf is used from loanwords of Pashto origin.

Hindko is generally written in a variety of the Shahmukhi. It was created by Rehmat Aziz Chitrali at Khowar Academy Chitral.

Hindko Perso-Arabic alphabet
Letter	Name of Letter	Transcription	IPA
آ	waḍḍi alif	ā	/ə/
ا	alif	a	/a/
ب	be	p	/b/
پ	pe	b	/p/
ت	te	t	/t/
ٹ	ṭe	ṭ	/ʈ/
ث	se	s	/s/
ج	jīm	j	/d͡ʒ/
چ	če	č	/t͡ʃ/
ح	he	h	/h/
خ	xe	x	/x/
ڇ	ʄe	ʄ	/ʄ/
د	dāl	d	/d/
ڈ	ḍāl	ḍ	/ɖ/
ذ	zāl	(z)	/z/
ر	re	r	/r/
ڑ	ṛe	ṛ	/ɽ/
ز	ze	z	/z/
ݬ	ce	c	/ɕ/
س	sīn	s	/s/
ش	šīn	š	/ʃ/
ص	svād	(s)	/s/
ض	zvād	(z)	/z/
ط	to'e	(t)	/t/
ظ	zo'e	(z)	/z/
ع	ˈain	('/'), (a), (e), (ē), (o), (i), (u)	/∅/, /ə/, /e/, /ɛ/, /o/, /ɪ/, /ʊ/
غ	ǧain	ǧ	/ɣ/
ف	fe	f	/f/
ق	qāf	q	/q/
ڨ	vāf	v	/v/
ک	kāf	k	/k/
گ	gāf	g	/g/
ل	lām	l	/l/
م	mīm	m	/m/
ن	nūn	n	/n/
ں	ñun	ñ	/ɲ/
ݩ	ñun	ñ	/ɲ/
ݩگ	ngun	ng	/ŋ/
ݨ	ṇūn	ṇ	/ɳ/
و	wāw	w	/ʋ/
ؤ	waw-e-hamza	'w	/ʔu/
ٷ	waw-e-humza-e-dumma	u	/ʊ/
ہ	coṭī he	h	/ɦ/
ھ	do cašmī he	_h	/◌ʰ/, /◌ʱ/
ء	hamza	'	/ʔ/
ی	coṭī ye	y, ī	/j/, /i/
ئ	hamza-e-yeh	ai	/æː/
ے	waḍḍi ye	e, ē	/e/, /ɛ/

== Literature ==
The Gandhara Hindko Board is an organisation that has been active for the preservation and promotion of the Hindko and culture since 1993. The board was launched in Peshawar in year 1993. It brings out four regular publications — Hindkowan, The Gandhara Voice, Sarkhail and Tarey, and a number of occasional publications. Late professor Zahoor Ahmad Awan of Peshawar city, the author of sixty-one books and publications, was the founding-chairman of the board. Presently the board is headed by Ejaz Ahmad Qureshi. The board has published first Hindko dictionary and several other books on a variety of topics. With head office in Peshawar, the organisation has regional offices in other cities of the province where Hindko is spoken and understood.

In 2003 the Gandhara Hindko Board published first a Hindko dictionary which was compiled by a prominent linguists from Abbottabad, Sultan Sakoon. The board published a second more comprehensive Hindko dictionary in 2007 prepared by Elahi Bakhsh Awan of the University of London. He is the author of Sarzamin-e-Hindko (lit. 'Hindko land'), and Hindko Sautiyat (lit. 'Hindko phonology'). His three booklets on Hindko phonology were published by the University of Peshawar in the late 1970s.

The Idara-e-Farogh-e Hindko based in Peshawar is another body for promoting Hindko. Riffat Akbar Swati and Aurangzeb Ghaznavi are key people of the organisation. The organisation has published the first Hindko translation of the Quran by Haider Zaman Haider and the first Ph.D. thesis on Hindko by E.B.A. Awan. A monthly magazine Faroogh is also published regularly from Peshawar under supervision of Aurangzeb Ghaznavi. In Karachi, Syed Mehboob has published articles in Farogh monthly. He is organiser of Hindko Falahi Forum.

Several organisations are active in Hazara, like Bazm-e-Ilm-o-Fun, Abbottabad and Halqa-e-Yaraan, Shinkyari to promote Hindko and literature, with Asif Saqib, Sufi Abdur Rasheed, Fazal-e-Akbar Kamal, Sharif Hussain Shah, Muhammad Farid, Yahya Khalid, Nazir Kasalvi, and Muhammad Hanif contributing in this regard. Sultan Sakoon has published books including those on Hindko proverbs and Hindko riddles.

=== Poetry example ===
An excerpt from the Kalām of Ahmad Ali Saayein:

الف اول ہے عالم ہست سی او
ہاتف آپ پکاریا بسمہ اللہ
فیر قلم نوں حکم نوشت ہویا
ہس کے قلم سر ماریا بسمہ اللہ
نقشہ لوح محفوظ دے وچ سینے
قلم صاف اتاریا بسمہ اللہ
اس تحریر نوں پڑھ کے فرشتیاں نے
سائیاں شکر گزاریا بسمہ اللہ

Transliteration: Alif-Awal hai Alam e hast sī o
Hātif āp pukārā Bismillah
Fīr Qalam nū̃ hukum e Nawišt hoyā
Hus ke qalam sir māriyā Bismillah
Naqšā Loh e Mahfūz dai wic sine
Qalam sāf utāriyā Bismillah
Is Tahrīr nū̃ paṛah ke Farištiyā̃ ne
Sāiyā̃ Šukar guzāriyā Bismillah

Translation:

He is the foremost from the world of existence

Voice of the unseen exclaimed Bismillah

The pen was ordered to write

Pen carried out the order to write Bismillah

When angels read this composition

Saaieaan, they showed their thankfulness with Bismillah

=== Proverbs ===
Hindko has a rich heritage of proverbs (Hindko matlaan, sg. matal). An example of a proverb:

جدھر سر ادھر سرہانڑا

Transliteration: Jidur sir udur sarhanra

Translation: "Good person gains respect everywhere."

== Bibliography ==
- Addleton, Jonathan S. (1986). "The Importance of Regional Languages in Pakistan". Al-Mushir. 28 (2): 58–80.
- Akhtar, Raja Nasim; Rehman, Khawaja A. (2007). "The Languages of the Neelam Valley". Kashmir Journal of Language Research. 10 (1): 65–84. ISSN 1028-6640.
- Awan, Elahi Bakhsh Akhtar (1974). The phonology of the verbal phrase in Hindko (PhD). SOAS, University of London. Archived from the original on 2021-04-18. A detailed study based on the dialect of the city of Peshawar. A version was published in 1994 by Idara Farogh-e-Hindko, Peshawar.
- Bahl, Kalicharan (1957). "A Note on Tones in Western Punjabi (Lahanda)". Indian Linguistics. 18: 30–34.
- Bahri, Hardev (1963). Lahndi Phonetics: With Special Reference to Awáṇkárí. Allahabad: Bharati Press.
- Bashir, Elena; Conners, Thomas J. (2019). A Descriptive Grammar of Hindko, Panjabi, and Saraiki. Berlin, Boston: De Gruyter Mouton. doi:10.1515/9781614512257. ISBN 978-1-61451-296-7. S2CID 203090889.
- Bhardwaj, Mangat Rai (2016). Panjabi. Routledge. doi:10.4324/9781315760803. ISBN 978-1-315-76080-3.
- Haroon-Ur-Rashid (2015a). "Acoustics of Hindko Affricate, Nasal, Liquid and Glide Segments". Kashmir Journal of Language Research. 18 (3): 191–202. ISSN 1028-6640.
- Haroon-Ur-Rashid (2015b). Syllabification and stress patterns in Hindko (PhD). University of Azad Jammu and Kashmir, Muzaffarabad. Archived from the original on 2020-02-29.
- Haroon-Ur-Rashid; Akhtar, Raja Nasim (2012). "Hindko Vowel System". Kashmir Journal of Language Research. 15 (2). ISSN 1028-6640.
- Haroon-Ur-Rashid; Akhtar, Raja Nasim (2013). "An Acoustic Analysis of Hindko Oral Vowels". Kashmir Journal of Language Research. 16 (2): 59–79. ISSN 1028-6640. ProQuest 1628966213.
- Haroon-Ur-Rashid; Khan, Abdul Qadir (2014). "A Phonemic and Acoustic Analysis of Hindko Fricatives". Acta Linguistica Asiatica. 4 (3). Archived from the original on 2020-02-29.
- Kiani, Zafeer Hussain; Bukhari, Nadeem; Ahmed, Jamil; Hameed, Nouman (2012). "Acoustic Analysis of Hindko Stops". Kashmir Journal of Language Research. 15 (2): 135–150. ISSN 1028-6640. ProQuest 1370361471.
- Lothers, Michael; Lothers, Laura (2010). Pahari and Pothwari: a sociolinguistic survey (Report). SIL Electronic Survey Reports. Vol. 2010–012. Archived from the original on 2019-10-18.
- Masica, Colin P. (1991). The Indo-Aryan languages. Cambridge language surveys. Cambridge University Press. ISBN 978-0-521-23420-7.
- Nawaz, Muhammad (2014). A descriptive study of segmental and selected suprasegmental features of Hindko dialect spoken in Tanawal, Hazara (PhD). International Islamic University, Islamabad. Archived from the original on 2020-02-29.
- Nawaz, Muhammad; Afsar, Ayaz (2016). "A Phonetic Analysis of Hindko Affricate Sounds". Kashmir Journal of Language Research. 19 (1): 65–73. ISSN 1028-6640.
- Pierce, Johnathan F. (2011). Dialectics of Linguistic Elicitation: Textuality, language ideology and consultant interventions in linguistic fieldwork among urban Hindko speakers (Thesis). United States -- Nevada: University of Nevada, Reno. ProQuest 918100986. Archived from the original on 2021-09-18.
- Rahman, Tariq (1996). Language and politics in Pakistan. Oxford University Press. ISBN 978-0-19-577692-8.
- Rensch, Calvin R. (1992). "The Language Environment of Hindko-Speaking People". In O'Leary, Clare F.; Rensch, Calvin R.; Hallberg, Calinda E. (eds.). Hindko and Gujari. Sociolinguistic Survey of Northern Pakistan. Islamabad: National Institute of Pakistan Studies, Quaid-i-Azam University and Summer Institute of Linguistics. ISBN 969-8023-13-5. Archived from the original on 2017-05-11.
- Shackle, Christopher (1979). "Problems of classification in Pakistan Panjab". Transactions of the Philological Society. 77 (1): 191–210. doi:10.1111/j.1467-968X.1979.tb00857.x. ISSN 0079-1636.
- Shackle, Christopher (1980). "Hindko in Kohat and Peshawar". Bulletin of the School of Oriental and African Studies. 43 (3): 482–510. doi:10.1017/S0041977X00137401. ISSN 0041-977X. S2CID 129436200.
- Shackle, Christopher (1983). "Language, Dialect and Local Identity in Northern Pakistan". In Wolfgang-Peter Zingel; Stephanie Zingel-Avé Lallemant (eds.). Pakistan in Its Fourth Decade: Current Political, Social and Economic Situation and Prospects for the 1980s. Mitteilungen des Deutschen Orient-Instituts. Vol. 23. Hamburg: Deutsches Orient-Institut. pp. 175–87.
- Shackle, Christopher (2003). "Panjabi". In Cardona, George; Jain, Dhanesh (eds.). The Indo-Aryan languages. Routledge language family series. Y. London: Routledge. pp. 581–621. ISBN 978-0-7007-1130-7.
- Sohail, Ayesha; Rehman, Khawaja A.; Kiani, Zafeer Hussain (2016). "Language divergence caused by LoC: a case study of District Kupwara (Jammu & Kashmir) and District Neelum (Azad Jammu & Kashmir)". Kashmir Journal of Language Research. 19 (2): 103–120. ISSN 1028-6640.
- Wyeth, Grant (2018). "A Precarious State: the Sikh Community in Afghanistan". Australian Institute of International Affairs. Archived from the original on 2019-10-11.
